= Wheelchair basketball at the 2024 Summer Paralympics – Women's team rosters =

This is a list of players that participated in the women's wheelchair basketball competition at the 2024 Summer Paralympics.

== Group A ==
=== Canada ===
The following is the Canada roster in the women's wheelchair basketball tournament of the 2024 Summer Paralympics.

Canada women's national wheelchair basketball team - 2024 Summer Paralympics roster
Players
Coaches

No.	Name	Age – Date of birth	Pts.
4	Rosalie Lalonde	27 – 27 March 1997	3.0
5	Elodie Tessier	28 – 14 March 1996	2.5
6	Arinn Young	28 – 10 July 1996	4.5
7	Cindy Ouellet	35 – 8 December 1988	3.5
8	Tamara Steeves	34 – 23 September 1989	1.5
10	Puisand Lai	24 – 29 July 2000	1.0
11	Tara Llanes	47 – 28 November 1976	1.5
12	Bethany Johnson	22 – 29 November 2001	4.0
13	Kady Dandeneau	34 – 25 January 1990	4.5
14	Sofia Fassi-Fehri	35 – 19 January 1989	1.0
15	Melanie Hawtin	36 – 20 July 1988	1.0
16	Desiree Isaac-Pictou	24 – 10 December 1999	4.0

Head coach

Michel Sung

Assistant coach(es)

Dylan Carter

Legend

- Age - describes age on 29 August 2024

=== China ===
The following is the China roster in the women's wheelchair basketball tournament of the 2024 Summer Paralympics.

China women's national wheelchair basketball team - 2024 Summer Paralympics roster
Players
Coaches

No.	Name	Age – Date of birth	Pts.
5	Xuejing Chen	30 – 1 September 1993	1.0
6	Xuemei Zhang	30 – 25 October 1993	4.0
7	Tonglei Zhang	30 – 5 September 1993	1.5
8	Guidi Lyu	31 – 6 May 1993	4.0
9	Suiling Lin	33 – 26 February 1991	3.0
10	Xiaolian Huang	33 – 20 September 1990	2.0
11	Jingwen Chen	22 – 28 November 2001	1.0
12	Qiaoling Qiu	25 – 15 March 1999	4.5
13	Meimei Zhang	21 – 30 September 2002	1.5
15	Yun Long	35 – 1 August 1989	1.5
16	Jiameng Dai	29 – 7 July 1995	4.5
17	Xiang He	23 – 22 May 2001	4.5

Head coach

Qi Chen

Assistant coach(es)

Yan Han Cintas

Legend

- Age - describes age on 29 August 2024

=== Great Britain ===
The following is the Great Britain roster in the women's wheelchair basketball tournament of the 2024 Summer Paralympics.

Great Britain women's national wheelchair basketball team - 2024 Summer Paralympics roster
Players
Coaches

No.	Name	Age – Date of birth	Pts.
4	Charlotte Moore	25 – 13 September 1998	1.0
5	Sophie Carrigill	30 – 19 January 1994	1.0
7	Helen Freeman	34 – 23 November 1989	4.0
8	Laurie Williams	32 – 4 February 1992	2.5
10	Amy Conroy	31 – 22 October 1992	4.0
12	Lucy Robinson	25 – 21 May 1999	4.5
14	Joy Haizelden	25 – 1 December 1998	2.5
15	Robyn Love	34 – 28 August 1990	3.5
16	Jade Atkin	22 – 18 September 2001	4.5
17	Maddie Martin	20 – 25 July 2004	3.0
18	Katie Morrow	24 – 20 September 1999	4.5
19	Jodie Waite	20 – 23 March 2004	1.0

Head coach

Miguel Vaquero Maestre

Assistant coach(es)

Jorge Borba Cintas

Legend

- Age - describes age on 29 August 2024

=== Spain ===
The following is the Spain roster in the women's wheelchair basketball tournament of the 2024 Summer Paralympics.

Spain women's national wheelchair basketball team - 2024 Summer Paralympics roster
Players
Coaches

No.	Name	Age – Date of birth	Pts.
4	Lourdes Ortega	26 – 22 September 1997	1.0
6	Sonia Ruiz	43 – 6 May 1981	2.5
8	Beatriz Zudaire	24 – 8 June 2000	3.0
9	Sara Revuelta	27 – 26 August 1997	1.0
11	Virgina Perez	36 – 12 January 1988	4.0
13	Victoria Vilarino	42 – 7 July 1982	4.0
14	Laura Ugarte	29 – 14 December 1994	1.5
16	Sindy Ramos	23 – 27 December 2000	3.0
21	Maria Heras	24 – 25 April 2000	3.5
28	Naiara Rodriguez	20 – 19 February 2004	3.0
51	Agurtzane Egiluz	27 – 18 April 1997	3.0
55	Isabel Lopez	32 – 6 July 1992	4.5

Head coach

Franck Belen

Assistant coach(es)

Victor Ramos

Legend

- Age - describes age on 29 August 2024

== Group B ==
=== Germany ===
The following is the Germany roster in the women's wheelchair basketball tournament of the 2024 Summer Paralympics.

Germany women's national wheelchair basketball team - 2024 Summer Paralympics roster
Players
Coaches

No.	Name	Age – Date of birth	Pts.
4	Mareike Miller	34 – 3 August 1990	4.5
5	Svenja Erni	21 – 9 July 2003	3.5
6	Catharina Weiss	24 – 2 June 2000	1.0
7	Anne Patzwald	35 – 2 July 1989	1.0
8	Vanessa Erskine	30 – 12 July 1994	1.0
9	Amanda Fanariotis	32 – 2 November 1991	4.5
10	Lisa Bergenthal	24 – 30 November 1999	3.5
11	Maya Lindholm	33 – 20 December 1990	2.5
12	Nathalie Passiwan	34 – 4 August 1990	4.5
13	Svenja Mayer	33 – 21 May 1991	2.5
14	Lilly Sellak	21 – 23 November 2002	3.5
15	Marie Kier	24 – 18 December 1999	1.0

Head coach

Dirk Passiwan

Assistant coach(es)

Ralf Neumann

Legend

- Age - describes age on 29 August 2024

=== Japan ===
The following is the Japan roster in the women's wheelchair basketball tournament of the 2024 Summer Paralympics.

Japan women's national wheelchair basketball team - 2024 Summer Paralympics roster
Players
Coaches

No.	Name	Age – Date of birth	Pts.
2	Izumi Zaima	27 – 4 December 1996	1.0
4	Amane Yaniagimoto	26 – 9 April 1998	2.5
5	Ruri Kojima	16 – 18 April 2008	2.5
6	Yuri Eguchi	23 – 9 October 2000	2.5
7	Mayumi Tsuchida	47 – 11 March 1977	4.0
9	Aoi Nishimura	18 – 8 August 2006	1.5
10	Mayo Hagino	31 – 9 March 1993	1.5
11	Miho Otsu	33 – 29 November 1990	2.5
12	Yui Ishikawa	27 – 11 November 1996	4.0
14	Chinami Shimizu	41 – 8 November 1982	1.5
15	Mari Animoto	35 – 15 November 1988	1.5
18	Chihiro Kitada	35 – 12 January 1989	2.5

Head coach

Hiroshi Iwano

Assistant coach(es)

Toshimitsu Morita

Legend

- Age - describes age on 29 August 2024

=== Netherlands ===
The following is the Nethewrelands roster in the women's wheelchair basketball tournament of the 2024 Summer Paralympics.

Netherlands women's national wheelchair basketball team - 2024 Summer Paralympics roster
Players
Coaches

No.	Name	Age – Date of birth	Pts.
2	Ilse Arts	34 – 7 June 1990	1.5
4	Sylvana van Hees	31 – 4 April 1993	1.5
5	Lindsay Frelink	25 – 6 August 1999	2.0
6	Jitske Visser	31 – 29 October 1992	1.0
8	Julia van der Sprong	24 – 27 September 1999	3.5
9	Bo Kramer	25 – 15 September 1998	4.5
10	Xena Wimmenhoeve	24 – 14 May 2000	4.0
11	Cher Korver	48 – 11 May 1976	2.5
12	Saskia Pronk	41 – 6 August 1983	1.0
14	Carina de Rooij	44 – 10 May 1980	3.0
15	Mariska Beijer	33 – 29 June 1991	4.0
16	Ylonne Post	22 – 16 December 2001	1.0

Head coach

Gertjan van der Linden

Assistant coach(es)

Irene Sloof

Legend

- Age - describes age on 29 August 2024

=== United States ===
The following is the United States roster in the women's wheelchair basketball tournament of the 2024 Summer Paralympics.

United States women's national wheelchair basketball team - 2024 Summer Paralympics roster
Players
Coaches

No.	Name	Age – Date of birth	Pts.
1	Alejandra Ibáñez	24 – 26 January 2000	2.5
4	Abigail Bauleke	23 – 31 July 2001	1.5
7	Josie Aslakson	28 – 14 September 1995	1.0
8	Natalie Schneider	41 – 11 February 1983	4.5
12	Rebecca Murray	34 – 15 March 1990	2.5
15	Rose Hollermann	28 – 25 December 1995	3.5
21	Kaitlyn Eaton	30 – 17 August 1994	1.5
24	Lindsey Zurbrugg	25 – 22 September 1998	2.5
34	Emily Oberst	26 – 27 August 1998	4.5
43	Bailey Moody	22 – 16 November 2001	4.0
54	Ixhelt Gonzalez	20 – 1 June 2004	4.5
55	Courtney Ryan	33 – 21 September 1990	2.0

Head coach

Robert Taylor

Assistant coach(es)

Scott Meyer

Legend

- Age - describes age on 28 August 2024
