= 2022 Wheelchair Basketball World Championships squads =

The following is the list of squads for the teams competing in the 2022 Wheelchair Basketball World Championships held in Dubai, United Arab Emirates, between 8 and 20 June 2023. Each team selected a squad of 12 players for the tournament.

Athletes are given an eight-level-score specific to wheelchair basketball, ranging from 0.5 to 4.5. Lower scores represent a higher degree of disability. The sum score of all players on the court cannot exceed 14.

== Women ==
=== Group A ===
==== Algeria ====
Head coach: Ahmed Taguiche
Coach: Youcef Houri

#	Name	Class
4	Nebia Mehimda	3
5	Yamina Ghoul	1.5
6	Fatima Khaled	3
7	Warda Ihamouchen	4
8	Fatima Bouzidi	1
9	Djamila Khemgani	4
10	Naima Abdeldjawad	1.5
11	Dahbia Semati	1.5
12	Kheira Zairi	4
13	Naoual Khedir	4
14	Samiha Abdelali	2.5
15	Menouba Foulani	4

==== Japan ====
Head coach: Hiroshi Iwano

Coach: Toshimitsu Morita

#	Name	Class
2	Izumi Zaima	1
4	Amane Yanagimoto	2.5
6	Yuri Eguchi	2.5
7	Mayumi Tsuchida	4
8	Hotaru Tatsuoka	2
10	Mayo Hagino	1.5
11	Miho Otsu	2.5
12	Yui Ishikawa	1
14	Chinami Shimizu	3
15	Mari Amimoto	4.5
18	Chihiro Kitada	4.5
24	Akiko Omori	2

==== Netherlands ====
Head coach: Gertjan van der Linden
Coach: Irene Sloof

#	Name	Class
2	Ilse Arts	1.5
4	Sylvana van Hees	1.5
5	Lindsay Frelink	2
6	Jitske Visser	1
8	Julia van der Sprong	3.5
9	Bo Kramer	4.5
10	Xena Wimmenhoeve	4
11	Cher Korver	2.5
12	Saskia Pronk	1
14	Carina de Rooij	3
15	Mariska Beijer	4
16	Ylonne Post	1

==== Germany ====
Head coach: Dirk Passiwan
Coach: Ralf Neumann

#	Name	Class
4	Svenja Erni	3.5
5	Mareike Miller	4.5
6	Catharina Weiß	1
7	Anne Patzwald	1
8	Katharina Lang	4.5
9	Amanda Fanariotis	4.5
10	Lisa Bergenthal	3.5
11	Maya Lindholm	2.5
12	Annabel Breuer	1.5
13	Svenja Mayer	2.5
14	Lena Knippelmeyer	4.5
15	Marie Kier	1

==== Thailand ====
Coach: Noppadol Wannaborworn
Head coach: Maturot Booncharoen

#	Name	Class
4	Anulak Sirinikorn	4
5	Wikarnda Phewgradang	1
6	Nopparat Tanbut	1
7	Warisa Thamlaaied	3
8	Natnapa Ponin	3
9	Nuttaporn Lasopa	3.5
10	Pimjai Putthanoi	3
11	Pornthip Kachunram	2
12	Saowalak Nanthasombat	4
13	Numthip Jalunporlerssin	1.5
14	Tananya Kaewmak	4
15	Pawarati Jala	1.5

==== United States ====
Coach: Desiree Miller
Head coach: Christina Schwab

#	Name	Class
1	Alejandra Ibanez	2.5
4	Abigail Bauleke	1.5
7	Josie Aslakson	1
8	Natalie Schneider	4.5
12	Rebecca Murray	2.5
15	Rose Hollermann	3.5
24	Lindsey Zurbrugg	2.5
33	Mackenzie Soldan	1
34	Emily Oberst	4.5
43	Bailey Moody	4
54	Ixhelt Gonzalez	4.5
55	Courtney Ryan	2

=== Group B ===
==== Australia ====
Head coach: Craig Campbell
Assistant coaches: Tina Mckenzie,
Lauren Robinson

#	Name	Class
4	Sarah Vinci	1
5	Jessica Cronje	4
6	Hannah Dodd	1
8	Georgia Munro-Cook	4.5
9	Annabelle Dennis	4.5
10	Laura Davoli	4
12	Georgia Inglis	2.5
14	Maryanne Latu	2.5
15	Amber Merritt	4.5
22	Isabel Martin	1
44	Lucinda Bueti	4
44	Breanna Fisk	1.5

==== Brazil ====
Coach: Marcos Araújo
Head coach: Martoni Sampaio

#	Name	Class
1	Ana De Lima	1
4	Cleonete Santos Reis	2
5	Gabriela Oliveira	3
6	Perla Assunção	2
10	Oara Assunção	4
12	Lia Martins Soares	4.5
14	Paola Klokler	3.5
15	Vileide Almeida	4.5
16	Silvelane Oliveria	3
22	Ivanilde Da Silva	3.5
23	Denise Eusébio	1.5
24	Maxcileide Ramos	1

==== Canada ====
Head coach: Marni Abbott-Peter
Coach:Tim Frick

#	Name	Class
5	Elodie Tessier	2.5
6	Arinn Young	4.5
7	Cindy Ouellet	3.5
8	Tamara Steeves	1.5
9	Megan Smith	2
10	Puisand Lai	1
11	Tara Llanes	1.5
12	Sandrine Berube	4.5
13	Kady Dandeneau	4.5
14	Sofia Fassi-Fehri	1
15	Melanie Hawtin	1

==== China ====
Head coach: Qi Chen
Coach: Yan Han

#	Name	Class
5	Xuejing Chen	1
6	Xuemei Zhang	4
7	Tonglei Zhang	1
8	Guidi Lyu	4
9	Suiling Lin	3
10	Xiaolian Huang	2
11	Jingwen Chen	1
12	Qiaoling Qiu	4.5
13	Meimei Zhang	1.5
15	Yun Long	1.5
16	Qiumin Cai	4
17	Xiang He	4.5

==== Spain ====
Coach: Franck Belen
Head coach: Adrián Yáñez

#	Name	Class
4	Lourdes Ortega	1
6	Sonia Ruiz	2.5
8	Beatriz Zudaire	3
9	Sara Revuelta	1
13	Victoria Vilariño	4
14	Laura Ugarte	2
16	Sindy Ramos	3
25	Uxia Chamorro	2.5
28	Naiara Rodriguez	3
44	Michelle Navarro	4
51	Agurtzane Egiluz	3
55	Isabel Lopez	4.5

==== Great Britain ====
Head coach: Miguel Vaquero
Coach: Jorge Borba

#	Name	Class
4	Charlotte Moore	1
5	Sophie Carrigill	1
6	Michaela Bell	1.5
7	Helen Freeman	4
9	Judith Hamer	4
12	Lucy Robinson	4.5
13	Siobhan Fitzpatrick	3
14	Joy Haizelden	2.5
16	Jade Atkin	4.5
17	Maddison Martin	3
18	Ellan Fraser	3
19	Adele Atkin	1

== Men ==
=== Group A ===
==== Australia ====
Head coach: Craig Friday

Coach: Grant Mizens

#	Name	Class
1	Samuel White	1
2	Frank Pinder	1
4	Eithen Leard	2
5	Bill Latham	4
6	Andrew Dewberry	3
7	Shaun Norris	3
8	Kim Robins	3
9	Tristan Knowles	4
10	Jannik Blair	1
11	Tom O'Neill-Thorne	3
14	Shawn Russell	4
34	Clarence McCarthy-Grogan	4

==== Brazil ====
Coach: Hugo Silva

Head coach: Itamar Silva

#	Name	Class
4	Guilherme Lourenço	4
5	Wallace Carvalho	2.5
6	Felipe Santos	1.5
7	Rildo Saldanha	3.5
8	Dwan Gomes Do Santos	1
9	Milley Lopes	3.5
10	Cristiano Clemente	4
11	Eduardo Da Silva	4.5
12	Amauri Viana	2
13	João Padilha	4
14	Sergio Júnior	1.5
15	Renato Silva	1

==== Italy ====
Head coach: Carlo Di Giusto

Coach: Roberto Ceriscioli

#	Name	Class
4	Giulio Papi	4
6	Simone De Maggi	4.5
7	Sabri Bedzeti	4
8	Andrea Giaretti	4
9	Francesco Minella	1
10	Dimitri Tanghe	3.5
11	Filippo Carossino	3.5
12	Matteo Cavagnini	4.5
13	Driss Saaid	1.5
14	Ahmed Raourahi	1.5
15	Enrico Ghione	4.5
16	Joel Joseph Boganelli	1

==== United Arab Emirates ====
Head coach: Abbas Aghakoucheki

Coach: Saif Mubarak

#	Name	Class
1	Badir Alhosani	4
3	Mohamed Alzarooni	4
8	Ibrahim Salim Alhammadi	3
10	Mohammed Alhashmi	1
15	Baniyas Tariq Alyassi	4
23	Mansour Alnaqbi	3.5
24	Jasim Mohamed Alnaqbi	2.5
29	Habib Al Booshi	3.5
30	Abdalla Alsuraim	2
63	Abdulla Alghafri	3
69	Mohammed Hashel Alhebsi	1
77	Jamal Albedwawi	2

=== Group B ===
==== Egypt ====
Head coach: Adel Sherif

Coach: Gamal Gadelrab

#	Name	Class
4	Touba Issa	2
5	Mahmoud Sabry
6	Mohamed Abdelaziz	2
7	Samy Elsabaawy	2
8	Mohamed Ahmed	2.5
9	Ashraf Ammar	4
10	Ahmed Amer	2.5
11	Alhassan Sedky	1
12	Magdy Abbas	2
13	Ahmed Abdelkafi	3
14	Mohamed Hassanein	4
15	Ashraf Sayed	3

==== Germany ====
Head coach: Nicolai Zeltinger

Coach: Martin Kluck

#	Name	Class
5	Nico Dreimüller	2
6	Matthias Güntner	4.5
7	Christopher Huber	1
8	Tobias Hell	1
9	Lukas Glossner	1
10	Jan Haller	2
11	Jan Sadler	3
12	Jens Albrecht	3
13	Thomas Böhme	3
14	Aliaksandr Halouski	4.5
15	Alexander Budde	3.5
18	Julian Lammering	3.5

==== Canada ====
Head coach: Matteo Feriani

Coach: Nicolas Palmer

#	Name	Class
4	Nikola Goncin	4.5
5	Garrett Ostepchuk	2
6	Robert Hedges	2.5
7	Vincent Dallaire	1.5
8	Blaise Mutware	3.5
9	Colin Higgins	4.5
10	Lee Melymick	1
11	Chad Jassman	1.5
12	Patrick Anderson	4.5
13	Jonathan Vermette	1
14	Tyler Miller	1.5
15	Reed De'Aeth	4.5

==== Great Britain ====
Head coach: Bill Johnson

Coach: Joey Johnson

#	Name	Class
5	Simon Brown	2
6	Kyle Marsh	2
7	Terence Bywater	4.5
9	Harrison Brown	2.5
11	Phil Pratt	3
12	Gregg Warburton	2
13	Martin Edwards	4
14	Lee Manning	4.5
15	Ben Fox	3.5
16	Jim Palmer	1
17	James Macsorley	2
18	Lee Fryer	4

=== Group C ===
==== Netherlands ====
Head coach: Cees van Rootselaar

Coach: Anton de Rooij

#	Name	Class
0	Frank De Jong	1
1	Robin Poggenwisch	3
2	Mendel Op Den Orth	4
3	Anil Cegil	2
7	Patrick De Boer	3
11	Mattijs Bellers	4.5
12	Gijs Even	4.5
15	Quinten Zantinge	3
17	Arie Twigt	3.5
21	Camilo Van Trijp	1
23	Mustafa Korkmaz	3
38	Joeri Van Liere	1

==== Argentina ====
Head coach: Mauro Varela

Coach: Amando Perez

#	Name	Class
4	Carlos Esteche	2.5
5	Facundo Wingerter	2
6	Joel Gabas	4
7	Franco Nicolás Alessandrini	1
8	Gustavo Villafañe	1
9	Juan Ignacio Celiz	2
10	Maximiliano Ruggeri	2.5
11	Daniel Copa	4.5
12	Matias Méndez	3
13	Adrián Jesús Pérez	3
14	Adolfo Berdun	3.5
15	Lucas Silva	3.5

==== South Korea ====
Head coach: Kwangyub Ko

Coach: Young-Moo Kim

#	Name	Class
0	Daeyoung Kong	1
8	Taeho Park	1
10	Minseong Kim	1.5
11	Jun Seong Kwak	1
12	Dong Gil Yang	4
13	Jihyeok Kim	4
14	Dong Ju Lim	2
16	Youn Joo Lee	3.5
23	Seung Hyun Cho	4
24	Chi Won Lee	2.5
39	Sangyeol Kim	4
40	Dong Hyeon Gim	4

==== France ====
Head coach: Karim El Gueddari

Coach: Stéphane Binot

#	Name	Class
4	Remi Bayle	2.5
5	Alexis Ramonet	4
7	Audrey Cayol	1.5
9	Soufyane Mehiaoui	3
10	Jérôme Laureri	1
17	Houcine BelaÏd	3.5
25	Christophe Carlier	3
26	Jérôme Duran	2
29	Louis Hardouin	2.5
64	Nicolas Jouanserre	4.5
92	Ibrahim Guirassy	1
93	Mamady Traore	4

=== Group D ===
==== United States ====
Coach: Robert Taylor

Coach: Tony Frescas

#	Name	Class
1	Jorge Sanchez	4
2	Jacob Williams	2.5
3	Talen Jourdan	1
7	Ryan Neiswender	2
8	Brian Bell	4.5
11	Steve Serio	3.5
14	Correy Rossi	2
16	Trevon Jenifer	2.5
25	Jorge Salazar	3.5
32	Fabian Romo	4
33	John Boie	1
44	Jeromie Meyer	2

==== Thailand ====
Coach: Pittaya Prathin

Head coach: Maziyar Mirazimi

#	Name	Class
4	Kwanchai Pimkorn	3.5
5	Thanakorn Lertanachai	1
6	Panphalit Loekhirantrakun	3
7	Adisak Kaoboo	1.5
8	Teerapong Pasomsap	3
9	Jakkapan Jansupin	1
10	Sirasak Rueangwongngam	4.5
11	Athin Singdong	4
12	Pongsakorn Sripirom	4
13	Siriphong Wongsuwoe	3
14	Natthakan Chaotarakan	3.5
15	Aekkasit Jumjarean	4

==== Iran ====
Head coach: Mohammadreza Dastyar

Coach: Behrouz Soltani

#	Name	Class
4	Abolfazl Jalaei	1
6	Amirreza Ahmadi	3
7	Omid Hadiazhar	4
8	Vahid Saadatpoormoghadam	2.5
10	Mohammad Mohammad Nezhad	1
11	Hakim Mansouri	2
12	Alireza Kamalifard	3
13	Mohsen Bigdeli	4
14	Mohamadhassan Sayari	4
23	Mohsen Tolouie Tamardash	3.5
33	Morteza Abedi	3
40	Abdoljalil Gharanjik	1.5

==== Iraq ====
Head coach: Khaki Abbas

Coach: Esmaeil Adel

#	Name	Class
4	Sajjad Al-omairi	1
5	Issa Al-yasiri	1.5
6	Ameer Chyad	3
7	Alaa Abdullah	3.5
8	Ridha Ahmed	1
9	Saif Al-taie	4
10	Hussein Bashara	4
11	Layth Al-attabi	4
12	Alaa Al-baidhani	1.5
13	Hayder Al-sarraji	4
14	Ahmed Shiltagh
15	Mohammed Karha
