= 2026 Wheelchair Basketball World Championships squads =

The following is the list of squads for each of the 12 men's and 10 women's teams competing in the 2026 Wheelchair Basketball World Championships in Ottawa, Canada, between 9 and 19 September 2026. Each team selected a squad of 12 players for the tournament.

Athletes are given an eight-level-score specific to wheelchair basketball, ranging from 0.5 to 4.5. Lower scores represent a higher degree of disability. The sum score of all players on the court cannot exceed 14.

== Men ==
=== Group A ===
==== Brazil ====
- Head coach:Cornelis Rootselaar
- Coach: Paulo Cesar dos Santos
- Coach: Marcos Araujo
- Coach: Fabiano de Castro

#	Name	Class
0	Plinio Macedo	2.5
3	Dwan Dos Santos	1
4	Carlos Cassimiro	1
5	Dario Filho	4.5
6	Norton Rodriges	3
7	Joao Nascimento	4
8	Alex da Silva	3
9	Cristiano Clemente	4
10	Anderson Ferreira	2.5
11	Eduardo da Silva	4.5
12	Gustavo Lasmar	2
41	Sergio Junior	1.5

==== Italy ====
- Head coach: Fabio Castellucci

#	Name	Class
0	Alessandro Sbuelz	4
4	Giulió Maria Papi	4
5	Gabriel Benvenuto	3
6	Simone De Maggi	4.5
9	Luigi Topo	3
12	Enrico Ghione	4.5
13	Driss Saaid	1.5
14	Ahmed Raourahi	1.5
16	Andrea Giaretti	4
20	Alessandro Pedron	1
22	Filippo Carossino	3.5
27	Joel Joseph Boganelli	1

==== Netherlands ====
- Head coach: Peter Van Noord
- Coach: Haj Bhania

#	Name	Class
0	Frank De Jong	1
1	Robin Poggenwisch	3
3	Anil CeĞil	1.5
5	Vigo Cudovan	1
12	Gijs Even	4.5
13	Fabian Jansen	3
15	Quinten Zantinge	3
16	Boris Van Hunnik	3
17	Arie Twigt	3.5
23	Mustafa Korkmaz	3
28	Tim Van Raamsdonk	2
40	Jelmer Van Brunschot	4.5

==== United States ====
- Head coach: Scott Meyer
- Coach: Ronald Lykins
- Coach: Michael Auprince

#	Name	Class
1	Jorge Sánchez	4
2	Jacob Williams	2.5
3	Talen Jourdan	1.5
8	Brian Bell	4.5
14	Paul Schulte	3
16	Trevon Jenifer	2.5
20	Jared Arambula	2.5
24	AJ Fitzpatrick	3
25	Jorge Salazar	3.5
32	Fabian Romo	4
33	John Boie	1
44	Jeromie Meyer	2

=== Group B ===
==== Argentina ====
- Head coach:Mauro Varela
- Coach: Juan Dominguez

#	Name	Class
4	Carlos Esteche	2.5
5	Fermin Wingerter	2
6	Joel Gabas	4
7	Franco Alessandrini	1
8	Martin Zito	1
9	Adriel Sanchez	2.5
10	Maximiliano Ruggeri	2
11	Daniel Copa	4.5
12	Matias Mendez	3
13	Adrian PÉrez	3
14	Brian Bordon	2.5
15	Lucas Muller	4.5

==== Australia ====
- Head coach: Brad Ness
- Coach: Brett Stibners
- Coach: Darren Allie

#	Name	Class
1	Samuel White	1
2	Frank Pinder	1
3	Jaylen Brown	4
4	Eithen Leard	2.5
5	Bill Latham	4
6	Steven Elliott	3.5
8	Jontee Brown	4.5
9	Tristan Knowles	4
11	Tom O'Neill-Thorne	3
13	Luke Pople	2.5
18	Phil Evans	2
23	Jeremy Tyndall	1.5

==== Great Britain ====
- Head coach: George Bates
- Coach: Daniel Johnson

#	Name	Class
4	Thomas Harvey	3
5	Simon Brown	2
7	Terence Bywater	4.5
10	Abdi Jama	1
12	Gregg Warburton	2
14	Lee Manning	4.5
16	Jim Palmer	1
18	Henley Cavanagh	2.5
20	Lewis Edwards	3
21	Oscar Knight	3.5
25	Phil Pratt	3
33	Ben Fox	3.5

==== Turkey ====
- Head coach: Can Aksu
- Coach: Selim Savaş Akarsu

#	Name	Class
3	Baran Oguz	3
4	Mustafa Muhi̇tti̇noğlu	4
7	Bülent Yilmaz	3.5
8	Deniz Acar	2.5
9	Uğur Toprak	3
12	Mucahit Günaydin	4
13	Burak Aygan	1
14	Yamac Yuksel	4.5
35	Ferit Gümüş	3
55	Murat Yazici	1
77	Ahmet Efetürk	4
99	Ahmet Saridağ	1

=== Group C ===
==== Colombia ====
- Head coach: Fredy Velasquez
- Coach: Leonardo Gomez

#	Name	Class
1	Jhan Carlos Quintero	4.5
7	Luis Angulo	4
9	Federico Lopez	2
12	Jairo Lazaro	1.5
14	Daniel Diaz	4.5
17	Oscar Restrepo	1
18	Juan Escobar	3
19	Jhon Hernandez	3.5
21	Sebastian Peña	1.5
29	Julian Lopez	2.5
30	Rodrigo Perez	4
33	Joymar Granados	2.5

==== Spain ====
- Head coach: Abraham Carriãn Ruiz
- Coach: Jonay Caraballo

#	Name	Class
4	Julio Alberto Vilas Fernandez	3
7	Pablo Jesús Zarzuela Beltran	3
8	Óscar Onrubia Gonzales	1.5
12	Biel Carbo Cortes	3
13	Manuel Enrique Diaz Lorenzo	3
17	Francisco GarcÍa Quiles	4
21	Pablo Lavandeira Poyato	1
24	Ignacio Ortega Lafuente	4
27	Adrian Ingelmo GarcÍa	3.5
55	Eduardo Geovanni Prieto Barragan	4
77	Luis Alfonso Cristen Barba	1.5
90	Alexis Ruiz Gonzalez	3.5

==== Japan ====
- Coach: Akira Toyoshima
- Head coach: Kazuyuki Kyoya

#	Name	Class
2	Renshi Chokai	2.5
4	Yoshinobu Takamatsu	4
5	Koki Maruyama	2.5
6	Rin Kawahara	1.5
7	Takuya Furusawa	3
8	Ryuga Akaishi	2.5
13	Reo Fujimoto	4.5
18	Ryohei Miyamoto	1
24	Naohiro Murakami	4
25	Kei Akita	3.5
55	Hiroaki Kozai	3.5
91	Rintaro Furusaki	2.5

==== Poland ====
- Coach: Wojciech Makowski
- Head coach: Marcin Balcerowski
- Coach: Arkadiusz Chlebda
- Coach: Patryk Pietraszko

#	Name	Class
3	Dominik Mosler	4
4	Mateusz Stan	3
5	Krzysztof Bandura	3.5
6	Andrzej Macek	1.5
7	Krzysztof Grzegorz Kozaryna	4.5
8	Adrian LabĘdzki	4
9	Piotr Darnikowski	1
10	Marek WesoŁowski	4
11	Jan Kawecki	2
12	Marcin Balcerowski	1
13	Piotr PaweŁko	1
19	Mateusz Filipski	4

=== Group D ===
==== Canada ====
- Head coach: Matteo Feriani
- Coach: Nicolas Palmer
- Coach: Jared Sajtos

#	Name	Class
4	Nikola Goncin	4.5
5	Garrett Ostepchuk	2
6	Joshua Brown	3
7	Brandon Louie	1.5
8	Lionel Tamoki	3.5
9	Colin Higgins	4.5
10	Lee Melymick	1
11	Ibrahim Odza	2.5
12	Kyrell Sopotyk	1
13	Blaise Mutware	3.5
14	Tyler Miller	1.5
15	Reed De'aeth	4.5

==== Germany ====
- Head coach: Jan Haller
- Coach: Martin Kluck
- Coach: Günther Mayer

#	Name	Class
6	Matthias Güntner	4.5
8	Tobias Hell	1
9	Lukas Glossner	1
11	Maximilian Lammering	3
13	Thomas Böhme	3
14	Aliaksandr Halouski	4.5
15	Alexander Budde	3.5
17	Nico Dreimüller	2
18	Julian Lammering	3.5
22	Jakob Kroemer	4.5
27	Thomas Reier	4.5
30	Alexander Keiser	2

==== Iran ====
- Head coach: Behrouz Soltani
- Coach: Mohammadreza Dastyar

#	Name	Class
6	Amirreza Ahmadi	3
7	Omid Hadiazhar	4
8	Vahid Saadatpoormoghadam	2.5
9	Mohsen Tolouie Tamardash	3
10	Mohammad Mohammad Nezhad	1
13	Morteza Abedi	3
14	Abdoljalil Gharanjik	1.5
23	Vahid Gholamazad	4.5
24	Mohamadhassan Sayari	4
34	Mohammadtaha Yarmohammadi	4.5
47	Mahdi Abbasi	3
99	Reza Niksirat	1

==== Morocco ====
- Head coach: Uchest Leal Ubaldo Rafael
- Coach: Abdelhak El Hadaoui

#	Name	Class
4	Zouhair Challat	2.5
5	Mohammed Oulini	2.5
6	Bilal Ben Hamman Lechhab	1
7	Moktar El Ghazzioui	2.5
8	Samir El Hamyani	3.5
9	Fouad El Moussati	2.5
10	Azeddine Haida	1.5
11	Mounir Moujoud	1
12	Nouredine Ben Fatah	4
13	Rida Maataoui	3.5
14	Aissa Falempe	4.5
15	Amine Gamri	3

== Women ==
=== Group A ===
==== Australia ====
Head coach: Jeremey Synot
Assistant coach: Matthew McShane
Assistant coach: Kelsey Griffin

#	Name	Class
4	Sarah Vinci	1
6	Hannah Dodd	1
8	Georgia Munro-Cook	4.5
10	Laura Davoli	4
11	Katelin Gunn	1.5
12	Shelley Matheson	3
13	Taishar Ovens	1
14	Maryanne Latu	2
22	Isabel Martin	1
23	Sara Houston	4
24	Ebony Stevenson	3
44	Lucinda Bueti	4

==== Brazil ====
Head coach: Evelyn Cristine Barbian
Coach:Rodrigo Zini

#	Name	Class
1	Ana De Lima	1
5	Gabriela Oliveira	2.5
6	Perla Assuncao	2
11	Adrienne De Souza	4
12	Lia Martins	4.5
15	Vileide Almeida	4.5
19	Brenda Vasconcelos	1
22	Geisa Vieira	4
23	Denise Eusebio	1.5
24	Maxileide Ramos	1
41	Paola Klokler	3.5
76	Oara Assuncao	4

==== Canada ====
Head coach: Joey Johnson
Coach: Craig Campbell
Coach: Martin Emmerson

#	Name	Class
4	Rosie Long	1
5	Élodie Tessier	2.5
6	Arinn Young	4.5
7	Cindy Ouellet	3.5
8	Tamara Steeves	1.5
10	Puisand Lai	1
11	Tara Llanes	1.5
12	Bethany Johnson	4
13	Kady Dandeneau	4.5
14	Elise Froese	4.5
15	Melanie Hawtin	1
16	Mercy Nyakundi	2.

==== China ====
Head coach: Qi Chen
Coach: Zhaoyuan Shao

#	Name	Class
5	Jingwen Chen	1
6	Xuemei Zhang	4
8	Mei Li	2
9	Suiling Lin	3
10	Xiaolian Huang	2
11	Peixi Zuo	1.5
12	Meimei Zhang	1.5
13	Qiaoling Qiu	4.5
15	Caiying Lyu	3
16	Rui Zhao	4.5
17	Yuhan Chen	4

==== Spain ====
Head coach: Victor Ramos
Coach: José Maria Conde

#	Name	Class
2	Irene Basoco Borinaga	4
4	Lourdes Rico Ortega	1
8	Beatriz Zudaire	3
9	Sara Garcia Revuelta	1
12	Carmen Hernandez Ros	2.5
13	Maria Victoria Alonso Vilariño	4
14	Laura Ugarte	1.5
18	Gabriela Michell Navarro Rodríguez	4
23	Lara Arenos Laverny	4
28	Naiara Rodriguez	3
55	Isabel Lopez Chavez	4.5
95	Lucía Ramo Alameda	2

==== Great Britain ====
Head coach: Miguel Vaquero
Coach: Jorge Borba

#	Name	Class
4	Charlotte Moore	1
5	Sophie Carrigill	1
8	Laurie Williams	2.5
9	Judith Hamer	4
10	Amy Conroy	4
12	Lucy Robinson	4.5
14	Joy Haizelden	2.5
15	Robyn Love	3.5
16	Jade Atkin	4.5
17	Maddison Martin	3
18	Katie Morrow	4.5
22	Alice McHaffie	3.5

=== Group B ===
==== Algeria ====
Head coach: Youcef Houri

#	Name	Class
4	Fatima Bouzidi	1
5	Naoual Khedir	4
6	Nadjet Menaceri	1
7	Dahbia Semati	1.5
8	Zazza Kadi	3
9	Mokhtaria Dlili	1
10	Warda Ihamouchen	4
11	Djamila Khemgani	4
12	Nebia Mehimda	3
13	Kheira Zairi	4
14	Samiha Abdelali	2.5
15	Fatima Khaled	3

==== France ====
Head coach: Mathis Mourcin
Coach: Fabien Kajganic

#	Name	Class
0	Mathilde Veuille	3.5
2	Marion Blais	4.5
4	Maria Ernest-Augustin	1
5	Loeiza Vari Le Roux	1
9	Lisa Clary-Galibert	2.5
10	Anne-Sophie Rubler	2
11	Maud Pruvost	4
15	Marion Dijoux	3
17	Louise Dookun	3.5
20	Grâce Wembolua	4
28	Lucie Nolet	2
75	Charlène Coatantiec	1

==== Germany ====
Head coach: Josef Jaglowski
Coach: Gesche Schünemann

#	Name	Class
4	Leyla-Nur Staehler	4
5	Svenja Erni	3.5
6	Catharina Weiss	1
7	Anne Patzwald	1
8	Verena Meyer	1
9	Lena Knippelmeyer	4.5
10	Lisa Bergenthal	3.5
11	Roli-Ann Neubauer	4.5
12	Annika Sonnleitner	2.5
13	Svenja Mayer	2.5
14	Lilly-Rose Sellak	3
15	Marie Kier	1

==== Japan ====
Head coach: Tomoe Soeda
Coach: Mana Yoshioka

#	Name	Class
2	Izumi Zaima	1
4	Amane Yanagimoto	2.5
7	Mayumi Tsuchida	4
10	Mayo Hagino	1.5
12	Chinami Shimizu	3
14	Haruka Ueno	2
15	Mari Amimoto	4.5
18	Chihiro Kitada	4.5
19	Yui Kitama	1
54	Nana Gunji	4
88	Meika Fujiwara	3

==== Netherlands ====
Head coach: Joost van Rangelrooij
Coach: Dennis Nohl
Coach: Malik Zafar

#	Name	Class
1	Anouk Taggenbrock	2.5
2	Ilse Arts	1.5
6	Jitske Visser	1
9	Bo Kramer	4.5
10	Xena Wimmenhoeve	4
11	Cher Korver	2.5
13	Jace Ravensburg	4
14	Carina de Rooij	3
15	Mariska Beijer	4
16	Ylonne Post	1
18	Amy Kaijen	2
20	Felice Lentze	1

==== United States ====
Head coach: Jeremy Lade
Coach: Ryan Hynes
Coach: Tracy Chynoweth

#	Name	Class
4	Abigail Bauleke	1.5
7	Josie Aslakson	1
8	Arelle Middleton	4
12	Becca Murray	2.5
15	Rose Marie Hollermann	3.5
21	Kaitlyn Eaton	1.5
24	Lindsey Zurbrugg	2.5
34	Emily Oberst	4.5
43	Bailey Moody	4
44	Zoe Voris	3.5
54	Ixhelt González	4.5
55	Courtney Ryan	2
