= 2023 Women's U25 Wheelchair Basketball World Championship =

- Venue: Thai-Japanese Stadium
- Location: Bangkok, Thailand
- Start date: 3 October 2023
- End date: 9 October 2019
- Competitors: 10 teams from 10 nations

The 2023 Women's U25 Wheelchair Basketball World Championship was held at the Thai-Japanese Stadium in Bangkok, Thailand, from 3 to 9 October 2023. It was the fourth wheelchair basketball world championship for women in the under-25 age category. Ten nations competed: Australia, Canada, China, Germany, Great Britain, Japan, South Africa, Spain, Thailand and the United States. The competition was won by the United States, with Great Britain taking silver and China claiming bronze.

== Competition ==
The 2023 Women's U25 Wheelchair Basketball World Championship was the fourth wheelchair basketball world championship for women in the under-25 age category. The event is held every four years; it was previously held in St. Catharines, Ontario, Canada, in 2011, in Beijing, China, in 2015, and in Suphanburi, Thailand in 2019. In 2023 it was held in Bangkok, Thailand.

Ten nations competed: Australia, Canada, China, Germany, Great Britain, Japan, South Africa, Spain, Thailand and the United States. The teams were divided into two pools of five A draw ceremony was conducted on the second day of the 2022 Wheelchair Basketball World Championships in Dubai, United Arab Emirates, in June 2023. The Australia, China, Great Britain, Spain and the United States were assigned to Group A, and Canada, Germany, Japan, South Africa, Thailand to Group B. The competition format called for the teams to play each team in their pool. Based on the rankings, the top eight sides then played a finals series.

== Venue ==
The tournament was originally scheduled to be held at the Indoor Huamark Stadium but structural damage caused by adverse weather conditions forced it to be relocated to the Thai-Japanese Stadium.

== Teams ==
=== Australia ===
 Head coach: Janna Mizens

Coach: David Kelly

#	Name	Class
1	Aaliyah Rauchle	3
2	Ebony Stevenson	3
7	Victoria Simpson	1.5
9	Annabelle Dennis	4.5
10	Laura Davoli	4
11	Katelin Gunn	1.5
14	Maryanne Latu	2.5
20	Sarah King	3
21	Emerald Wilmshurst	4.5
22	Isabel Martin	1
23	Lauren Hardbottle	4
45	Breanna Fisk	1.5

=== Great Britain ===
 Head coach: George Bates
Coach: Miguel Vaquero

#	Name	Class
4	Niamh Watson	1
7	Anastasia Blease	3.5
8	Adele Atkin	1
9	Kayli English	2
10	Alice Mchaffie	4
11	Katie Morrow	4.5
12	Lucy Robinson	4.5
15	Holly Lounds	3.5
16	Jade Atkin	4.5
17	Maddison Martin	3
18	Ellan Fraser	3
19	Jodie Waite	1

=== Thailand ===
 Head coach: Akkapol Kunpradit
Coach: Aekkasit Jumjarean

#	Name	Class
4	Aungkana Phuthat	1
7	Waritsara Phoemkhunthod	1.5
8	Tharnthip Klinkajorn	4
9	Weerada Patitang	1
10	Panadda Srithong	1
11	Phattharamon Sangkhum	4
12	Saowalak Nanthasombat	4
14	Warisa Thamlaaied	3

=== Canada ===
 Head coach: Marni Abbott-Peter
Coach: Dylan Carter

#	Name	Class
4	Megan Smith	2.5
5	Mercy Nyakundi	2.5
6	Kayla Mackinnon	1.5
7	Katie Bajema	1
8	Maggie Manning	2
9	Lily Brook	4.5
10	Puisand Lai	1
11	Charlotte Mcelroy	2.5
12	Desiree Isaac-Pictou	4
13	Elise Froese	4.5
15	Bethany Johnson	4

=== Japan ===
 Head Coach: Tomoe Soeda
Coach: Sukemasa Tokunaga
Coach: Takahiro Tachibana

#	Name	Class
2	Ruri Kojima	2.5
6	Yuri Eguchi	2.5
7	Nana Gunji	4
9	Aoi Nishimura	2
10	Hirono Tanabu	1
11	Yui Aoyama	1
17	Shiori Masuda	2.5
20	Akane Toya	1.5
31	Moe Hatakeyama	4

=== United States ===
 Coach: Jacob Counts
Head coach: Ryan Hynes

#	Name	Class
1	Alejandra Ibáñez	2.5
3	Erin Buckles	1
4	Abigail Bauleke	1.5
5	Josie Dehart	3
7	Abigayle Dunn	1
13	Quinn Meyer	2.5
14	Emilee Gustafson	4
20	Hayley Nilsen	1
24	Madelyn Edwards	3
41	Moira Paulus	3.5
43	Bailey Moody	4
54	Ixhelt González	4.5

=== China ===
Head coach: Qi Chen

#	Name	Class
11	Jingwen Chen	1
12	Qiaoling Qiu	4.5
13	Meimei Zhang	1.5
16	Qiumin Cai	4
17	Xiang He	4.5
18	Peixi Zuo	1.5
19	Wei Jiang	3
20	Taorong Yang	2.5
21	Rui Zhao	4.5
22	Meiying Mo	3.5
23	Huiqin Chen	4
24	Caiwen Hu	1.5

=== South Africa ===
 Head coach: Lawrence "Trooper" Johnson

Coach: Siphamandla Gumbi

#	Name	Class
4	Aphilile Xhalisile	1
5	Palesa Moeng	1
6	Lizayo Gwadana	1
7	Samkelisiwe Mbhata	2
8	Zukiswa Gansa	2.5
9	Londeka Mthembu	2.5
10	Nolitha Kibido	3.5
11	Michelle Moganedi	3
12	Ongezwa Hagu	4
13	Asive Gilifile	4

=== Germany ===
 Head coach: Dennis Nohl

Coach: Marina Mohnen

#	Name	Class
4	Svenja Erni	3.5
5	Anna-Lena Hennig	3
6	Catharina Weiss	1
7	Saskia Zimmermann	4.5
8	Leyla-Nur Staehler	4
9	Lilly-Rose Sellak	3.5
10	Lisa Bergenthal	3.5
11	Kim Zettlitz	2.5
12	Annika Sonnleitner	2.5
13	Valeska Finger	2.5
14	Johanna Ernst	1.5
15	Marie Kier	1

=== Spain ===
 Head coach: Sonia Ruiz
Coach: Jose Manuel Conde Moreno

#	Name	Class
6	Maria Heras	3.5
7	Irati Moro Olea	4.5
8	Beatriz Zudaire	3
12	Carmen Hernandez Ros	2.5
14	Uxia Chamorro	2.5
16	Sindy Ramos	3
22	Andrea Santana	2
23	Lara Arenos Laverny	4
28	Naiara Rodriguez	3
77	Tania Garcia De La Cruz	2

== Playoff round ==
=== Pool A ===
Team	Pld	W	L	PF	PA	PD	Pts.
United States	4	4	0	294	114	+180	8
Great Britain	4	3	1	222	177	+45	7
China	4	2	2	167	182	-15	6
Spain	4	1	3	160	243	-83	5
Australia	4	0	4	137	264	-127	4

4 October 2023
20:30

Statistics

Australia	39–64	Great Britain
Scoring by quarter: 9-15, 15-28, 29-52, 39-64
Pts: M. Latu, 12; Rebs: L. Davoli, 9 Asts: M. Latu, 6		Pts: L. Robinson, 15; Rebs: A. Blease, 9 Asts: J. Atkin, 5

Bangkok Youth Center Court 1

5 October 2023
12:30

Statistics

Australia	16–85	United States
Scoring by quarter: 4-18, 6-36, 10-67, 16-85
Pts: M. Latu, L. Davoli, 6 Rebs: L. Davoli, 11		Pts: I. Gonzalez, 19; Rebs: I. Gonzalez, 9 Asts: A. Ibanez, 6

Bangkok Youth Center Court 1

5 October 2023
18:30

Statistics

China	62–43	Australia
Scoring by quarter: 17-6, 37-15, 48-33, 62-43
Pts: X. He, 14; Rebs: X. He, 6 Asts: Q. Qiu, 12		Pts: M. Latu, 16; Rebs: L. Davoli, 9 Asts: M. Latu, 6

Bangkok Youth Center Court 1

6 October 2023
20:30

Statistics

Spain	53–39	Australia
Scoring by quarter: 10-16, 30-28, 42-33, 53-39
Pts: B. Zudaire, 22; Rebs: B. Zudaire, 16; Asts: B. Zudaire, 6		Pts: A. Dennis, 18; Rebs: A. Dennis, 13; Asts: M. Latu, 7

Bangkok Youth Center Court 1

5 October 2023
12:30

Statistics

Great Britain	51–28	China
Scoring by quarter: 10-4, 26-12, 41-24, 51-28
Pts: K. Morrow, 21; Rebs: L. Robinson, 13; Asts: M. Martin, 3		Pts: Q. Qiu, 14; Rebs: H. Chen, 10

Bangkok Youth Center Court 2

6 October 2023
14:30

Statistics

China	54–33	Spain
Scoring by quarter: 15-7, 27-12, 42-24, 54-33
Pts: Q. Qiu, 21; Rebs: Q. Qiu, 7 Asts: Q. Qiu, 12		Pts: B. Zudaire, 11; Rebs: B. Zudaire, 7 Asts: B. Zudaire, 7

Bangkok Youth Center Court 1

6 October 2023
18:30

Statistics

United States	55–23	China
Scoring by quarter: 20-5, 33-15, 48-21, 55-23
Pts: I. Gonzalez, 17; Rebs: B. Moody, 16; Asts: A. Ibanez, 5		Pts: Q. Qiu, 10; Rebs: Q. Qiu, 9 Asts: Q. Qiu, 3

Bangkok Youth Center Court 1

5 October 2023
16:30

Statistics

Spain	41–65	Great Britain
Scoring by quarter: 12-15, 20-32, 34-48, 41-65
Pts: B. Zudaire, 23; Rebs: B. Zudaire, 7 Asts: N. Rodriguez, 4		Pts: L. Robinson, 16; Rebs: J. Atkin, 7 Asts: L. Robinson, 5

Bangkok Youth Center Court 1

6 October 2023
12:30

Statistics

Great Britain	42–69	United States
Scoring by quarter: 13-13, 29-25, 35-47, 42-69
Pts: K. Morrow, 14; Rebs: J. Atkin, 6 Asts: J. Atkin, 4		Pts: I. Gonzalez, 40; Rebs: I. Gonzalez, 10; Asts: I. Gonzalez, 5

Bangkok Youth Center Court 1

5 October 2023
08:30

Statistics

United States	85–33	Spain
Scoring by quarter: 21-13, 37-16, 61-24, 85-33
Pts: I. Gonzalez, 31; Rebs: B. Moody, 9 Asts: B. Moody, 6		Pts: B. Zudaire, 16; Rebs: B. Zudaire, 8 Asts: B. Zudaire, 2

Bangkok Youth Center Court 2

=== Pool B ===
Team	Pld	W	L	PF	PA	PD	Pts.
Germany	4	4	0	210	108	+102	8
Canada	4	2	2	165	148	+17	6
Japan	4	2	2	146	175	-29	6
Thailand	4	2	2	175	170	+5	6
South Africa	4	0	4	113	208	-95	4

4 October 2023
16:00

Statistics

South Africa	24–50	Canada
Scoring by quarter: 8-17, 12-23, 20-34, 24-50
Pts: O. Hagu, 12; Rebs: A. Gilifile, 19; Asts: O. Hagu, 4		Pts: E. Froese, 25; Rebs: B. Johnson, 9 Asts: P. Lai, 3

Bangkok Youth Center Court 2

5 October 2023
10:30

Statistics

Canada	37–41	Thailand
Scoring by quarter: 10-8, 17-23, 22-36, 37-41
Pts: P. Lai, 14; Rebs: E. Froese, 15; Asts: P. Lai, 3		Pts: W. Thamlaaied, 20; Rebs: P. Sangkhum, 21; Asts: S. Nanthasombat, 7

Bangkok Youth Center Court 2

5 October 2023
14:30

Statistics

Japan	36–48	Canada
Scoring by quarter: 9-13, 16-25, 29-37, 36-48
Pts: R. Kojima, 21; Rebs: Y. Eguchi, 13; Asts: N. Gunji, 4		Pts: P. Lai, 20; Rebs: E. Froese, 10; Asts: M. Smith, 6

Bangkok Youth Center Court 1

6 October 2023
08:30

Statistics

Canada	30–47	Germany
Scoring by quarter: 3-22, 14-30, 24-40, 30-47
Pts: E. Froese, 12; Rebs: E. Froese, 13; Asts: P. Lai, 1		Pts: S. Erni, 11; Rebs: L. Bergenthal, 7 Asts: L. Bergenthal, 14

Bangkok Youth Center Court 1

4 October 2023
18:15

Statistics

Germany	52–36	Thailand
Scoring by quarter: 16-2, 24-15, 34-19, 52-36
Pts: S. Zimmermann, 12; Rebs: L. Staehler, 7 Asts: L. Bergenthal, 8		Pts: S. Nanthasombat, 24; Rebs: S. Nanthasombat, 20; Asts: W. Thamlaaied, 5

Bangkok Youth Center Court 2

5 October 2023
08:30

Statistics

South Africa	31–46	Germany
Scoring by quarter: 10-15, 18-29, 22-38, 31-46
Pts: M. Moganedi, 14; Rebs: A. Gilifile, 20; Asts: M. Moganedi, 7		Pts: S. Erni, 9 Rebs: S. Zimmermann, 7 Asts: L. Bergenthal, 3

Bangkok Youth Center Court 1

5 October 2023
10:30

Statistics

Germany	65–11	Japan
Scoring by quarter: 20-2, 37-4, 51-4, 65-11
Pts: S. Erni, 27; Rebs: L. Bergenthal, 12; Asts: L. Bergenthal, 8		Rebs: N. Gunji, 11

Bangkok Youth Center Court 1

6 October 2023
10:30

Statistics

Japan	47–38	Thailand
Scoring by quarter: 9-8, 21-20, 41-32, 47-38
Pts: Y. Eguchi, 22; Rebs: Y. Eguchi, 13; Asts: R. Kojima, 10		Pts: W. Thamlaaied, 28; Rebs: S. Nanthasombat, 15; Asts: S. Nanthasombat, 8

Bangkok Youth Center Court 1

6 October 2023
16:30

Statistics

South Africa	24–52	Japan
Scoring by quarter: 8-14, 16-16, 22-28, 24-52
Pts: M. Moganedi, 12; Rebs: A. Gilifile, 17; Asts: M. Moganedi, 4		Pts: Y. Eguchi, 20; Rebs: Y. Eguchi, 8 Asts: R. Kojima, 10

Bangkok Youth Center Court 1

5 October 2023
20:30

Statistics

Thailand	60–34	South Africa
Scoring by quarter: 12-8, 27-11, 41-22, 60-34
Pts: S. Nanthasombat, 31; Rebs: S. Nanthasombat, 11; Asts: W. Thamlaaied, 9		Pts: M. Moganedi, 18; Rebs: O. Hagu, 14; Asts: M. Moganedi, 7

Bangkok Youth Center Court 1

== Finals ==
Quarter-finals
7 October 2023 – 17:15
United States	59
Thailand	24
7 October 2023 – 12:15
Canada	26
China	38
7 October 2023 – 10:30
Great Britain	72
Japan	39
7 October 2023 – 15:00
Germany	46
Spain	53

Semi-finals
8 October 2023 – 16:15
United States	61
China	19
8 October 2023 – 14:00
Great Britain	54
Spain	41

Final
9 October 2023 – 14:30
United States	72
Great Britain	49
Third place
9 October 2023 – 12:15
China	47
Spain	29

=== Quarter-finals ===
7 October 2023
17:15

Statistics

United States	59–24	Thailand
Scoring by quarter: 20-2, 35-10, 47-20, 59-24
Pts: I. Gonzalez, 14; Rebs: B. Moody, 8 Asts: E. Gustafson, 3		Pts: S. Nanthasombat, 18; Rebs: W. Thamlaaied, 14; Asts: W. Thamlaaied, 3

Bangkok Youth Center Court 1

7 October 2023
12:45

Statistics

Canada	26–38	China
Scoring by quarter: 6-11, 12-23, 18-27, 26-38
Pts: P. Lai, 10; Rebs: E. Froese, 11; Asts: P. Lai, 4		Pts: Q. Qiu, 12; Rebs: M. Zhang, 7 Asts: Q. Qiu, 7

Bangkok Youth Center Court 1

7 October 2023
10:30

Statistics

Great Britain	72–39	Japan
Scoring by quarter: 14-7, 36-23, 58-32, 72-39
Pts: A. Blease, 18; Rebs: J. Waite, 7 Asts: A. Mchaffie, 6		Pts: Y. Eguchi, 18; Rebs: Y. Eguchi, 8 Asts: M. Hatakeyama, 6

Bangkok Youth Center Court 1

7 October 2023
15:00

Statistics

Germany	46–53	Spain
Scoring by quarter: 10-16, 24-32, 30-43, 46-53
Pts: B. Zudaire, 18; Rebs: M. Heras, 9 Asts: B. Zudaire, 9		Pts: S. Erni, 16; Rebs: S. Erni, 8 Asts: L. Bergenthal, 7

Bangkok Youth Center Court 1

=== 5th-8th place ===
8 October 2023
11:45

Statistics

Canada	54–35	Thailand
Scoring by quarter: 15-7, 23-16, 41-28, 54-35
Pts: E. Froese, 26; Rebs: E. Froese, 12; Asts: P. Lai, 8		Pts: S. Nanthasombat, 19; Rebs: S. Nanthasombat, 18; Asts: S. Nanthasombat, 5

Bangkok Youth Center Court 1

8 October 2023
11:45

Statistics

Germany	56–21	Japan
Scoring by quarter: 13-6, 30-6, 42-18, 56-21
Pts: J. Ernst, 10; Rebs: L. Bergenthal, 5 Asts: V. Finger, 3		Pts: Y. Eguchi, 7 Rebs: N. Gunji, 16; Asts: R. Kojima, 5

Bangkok Youth Center Court 2

=== 9th-10th place ===
8 October 2023
09:30

Statistics

South Africa	37–57	Australia
Scoring by quarter: 8-18, 14-35, 20-47, 37-57
Pts: A. Gilifile, 16; Rebs: A. Gilifile, 15; Asts: L. Mthembu, 4		Pts: M. Latu, 14; Rebs: A. Dennis, 9 Asts: M. Latu, 6

Bangkok Youth Center Court 1

=== 7th-8th place ===
9 October 2023
10:00

Statistics

Japan	36–47	Thailand
Scoring by quarter: 11-10, 21-20, 23-34, 36-47
Pts: R. Kojima, 17; Rebs: Y. Eguchi, 7 Asts: N. Gunji, 4		Pts: W. Thamlaaied, 25; Rebs: S. Nanthasombat, 12; Asts: W. Thamlaaied, 4

Bangkok Youth Center Court 2

=== 5th-6th place ===
9 October 2023
10:00

Statistics

Germany	53–33	Canada
Scoring by quarter: 16-6, 25-17, 45-26, 53-33
Pts: L. Bergenthal, 14; Rebs: S. Erni, 10; Asts: L. Bergenthal, 7		Pts: P. Lai, 20; Rebs: P. Lai, 9 Asts: D. Isaac-pictou, 4

Bangkok Youth Center Court 1

=== Semi-finals ===
8 October 2023
14:00

Statistics

Great Britain	54–41	Spain
Scoring by quarter: 12-10, 24-19, 32-27, 54-41
Pts: K. Morrow, 24; Rebs: L. Robinson, 10; Asts: L. Robinson, 5		Pts: B. Zudaire, 29; Rebs: B. Zudaire, 6 Asts: B. Zudaire, 4

Bangkok Youth Center Court 1

8 October 2023
16:15

Statistics

United States	61–19	China
Scoring by quarter: 12-4, 31-7, 47-14, 61-19
Pts: B. Moody, 19; Rebs: B. Moody, 9 Asts: I. Gonzalez, 4		Pts: Q. Qiu, 6 Rebs: Q. Qiu, 7 Asts: Q. Qiu, 3

Bangkok Youth Center Court 1

=== Third place ===
9 October 2023
12:15

Statistics

China	47–29	Spain
Scoring by quarter: 7-6, 24-16, 31-23, 47-29
Pts: M. Zhang, 16; Rebs: H. Chen, 9 Asts: Q. Qiu, 13		Pts: B. Zudaire, 19; Rebs: N. Rodriguez, 8 Asts: B. Zudaire, 3

Bangkok Youth Center Court 1

=== Final ===
9 October 2023
14:30

Statistics

United States	72–49	Great Britain
Scoring by quarter: 16-10, 31-28, 47-38, 72-49
Pts: I. Gonzalez, 26; Rebs: I. Gonzalez, 11; Asts: I. Gonzalez, 9		Pts: J. Atkin, 16; Rebs: L. Robinson, 8 Asts: K. Morrow, 5

Bangkok Youth Center Court 1
