= Zoe Voris =

American wheelchair basketball player

Personal information
- Nationality: American
- Born: December 4, 1998 (age 27)
- Home town: Chicago, Illinois, U.S.

Sport
- Sport: Wheelchair basketball
- Disability class: 3.5
- College team: University of Texas at Arlington
- Coached by: Trooper Johnson
Medal record
Women's wheelchair basketball
Representing the United States
Paralympic Games
Bronze medal – third place	2020 Tokyo	Team
World Championship
Gold medal – first place	2026 Ottawa	Team

Zoe Voris (born December 4, 1998) is an American wheelchair basketball player and a member of the United States women's national wheelchair basketball team. She represented the United States at the 2020 Summer Paralympics.

== Career ==
Voris represented the United States at the 2020 Summer Paralympics in the wheelchair basketball women's tournament and won a bronze medal.
