= Bailey Moody =

American wheelchair basketball player

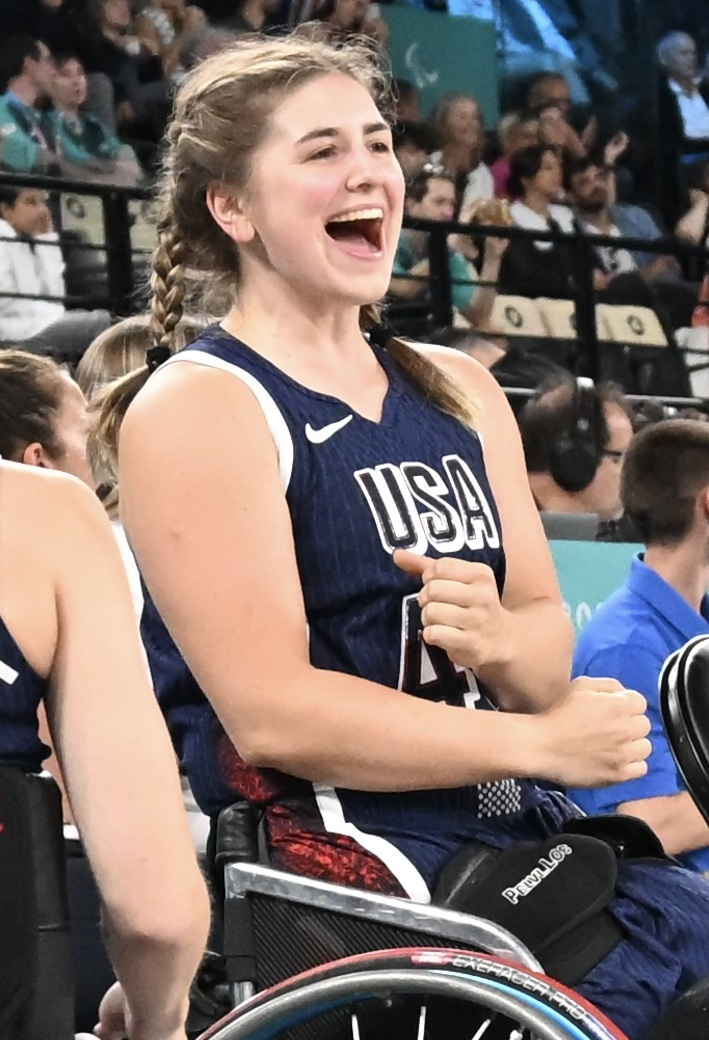
- Moody at the 2024 Summer Paralympics

Personal information
- Full name: Bailey Grace Moody
- Born: November 16, 2001 (age 24) Atlanta, Georgia, U.S.
- Height: 5 ft 7 in (1.70 m)

Sport
- Sport: Wheelchair basketball
- Disability class: 4.0
- College team: University of Alabama
- Coached by: Christina Schwab
Medal record
Representing the United States
Women's wheelchair basketball
Paralympic Games
Silver medal – second place	2024 Paris	Team
Bronze medal – third place	2020 Tokyo	Team
World Championship
Gold medal – first place	2026 Ottawa	Team
Bronze medal – third place	2022 Dubai	Team
Parapan American Games
Gold medal – first place	2023 Santiago	Team
Silver medal – second place	2019 Lima	Team
U25 Women's World Championships
Gold medal – first place	2019 Suphanburi	Team
Gold medal – first place	2023 Bangkok	Team

Bailey Grace Moody (born November 16, 2001) is an American wheelchair basketball player and a member of the United States women's national wheelchair basketball team. She represented the United States at the 2020 and 2024 Summer Paralympics.

== Early life ==
Moody was diagnosed with stage four osteosarcoma at age 10. She underwent a rotationplasty, that resulted in the amputation of her right leg, to save her chance at an active life, despite facing eight months of chemotherapy. She attended Providence Christian Academy in Lilburn, Georgia and attends the University of Alabama.

== Career ==
Moody represented the United States at the 2018 Wheelchair Basketball World Championship and finished in sixth place in the tournament. In August 2019 she competed at the 2019 Parapan American Games in the wheelchair basketball tournament and won a silver medal.

Moody represented the United States at the 2020 Summer Paralympics in the wheelchair basketball women's tournament and won a bronze medal.

She again represented the United States at the 2022 Wheelchair Basketball World Championships and won a bronze medal.

In November 2023 she competed at the 2023 Parapan American Games in the wheelchair basketball tournament and won a gold medal. As a result, the team earned an automatic bid to the 2024 Summer Paralympics. On March 30, 2024, she was named to Team USA's roster to compete at the 2024 Summer Paralympics.
