= Abigail Bauleke =

American wheelchair basketball player

Personal information
- Full name: Abigail Vivian Bauleke
- Nickname: Abby
- Born: July 31, 2001 (age 25) Minneapolis, Minnesota, U.S.

Sport
- Sport: Wheelchair basketball
- Disability class: 1.0
- College team: University of Alabama
- Coached by: Christina Schwab
Medal record
Women's wheelchair basketball
Representing the United States
Paralympic Games
Silver medal – second place	2024 Paris	Team
Bronze medal – third place	2020 Tokyo	Team
World Championship
Gold medal – first place	2026 Ottawa	Team
Bronze medal – third place	2022 Dubai	Team
Parapan American Games
Gold medal – first place	2023 Santiago	Team
U25 Women's World Championships
Gold medal – first place	2019 Suphanburi	Team
Gold medal – first place	2023 Bangkok	Team

Abigail Vivian Bauleke (born July 31, 2001) is an American wheelchair basketball player and member of the United States women's national wheelchair basketball team. She represented the United States at the 2020 and 2024 Summer Paralympics.

== Career ==
In May 2019 she represented the U25 Women's team at the 2019 Women's U25 Wheelchair Basketball World Championship and won a gold medal.

Bauleke represented the United States at the 2020 Summer Paralympics in the wheelchair basketball women's tournament and won a bronze medal.

She represented the United States at the 2022 Wheelchair Basketball World Championships and won a bronze medal.

In November 2023 she competed at the 2023 Parapan American Games in the wheelchair basketball tournament and won a gold medal. As a result, the team earned an automatic bid to the 2024 Summer Paralympics. On March 30, 2024, she was named to Team USA's roster to compete at the 2024 Summer Paralympics.
