= Elise Froese =

Canadian wheelchair basketball player (born 2006)

- Froese at the 2026 Wheelchair Basketball World Championships

Personal information
- Born: July 19, 2006 (age 20)
- Education: University of Arizona
- Height: 5'10.5”

Sport
- Sport: Wheelchair basketball
- Disability: Osteochondral defect
- Disability class: 4.5
Medal record
Women's wheelchair basketball
Representing Canada
World Championship
Silver medal – second place	2026 Ottawa	Team

Elise Froese (born 19 July 2006) is a Canadian wheelchair basketball player and a member of Canada women's national wheelchair basketball team.

== Early life ==
Froese was a basketball and volleyball athlete in school. However, by the time she reached Grade 7, the osteochondral defect (OCD) in her leg had progressed to the point she had to look for alternatives. She then transitioned to wheelchair basketball.

== Career ==
In August 2025, Froese made her senior national team debut at the 2025 Americas Cup and helped Canada win a bronze medal. During her first game against Brazil, she recorded a team-high 20 points and seven rebounds. During the bronze medal game against Argentina, she recorded eight points and six rebounds off the bench. She then served as the flag bearer for Canada during the opening ceremony at the 2025 Youth Parapan American Games. She helped Canada win gold in the women's 3x3 wheelchair basketball tournament.

In August 2026, she was selected to represent Canada at the 2026 Wheelchair Basketball World Championships. On September 15, 2026, during the final group stage game against Great Britain, she recorded 12 points and two rebounds in a 92–91 double overtime victory to help Canada finish atop Group A with a perfect 5–0 record.
