= Jim Palmer (wheelchair basketball) =

British wheelchair basketball player (born 1997)

James Palmer
Personal information
- Nickname: Jim
- Born: 22 April 1997 (age 29)

Sport
- Sport: Wheelchair basketball
- Disability class: 1.0
Medal record
Men's wheelchair basketball
Representing Great Britain
Paralympic Games
Silver medal – second place	2024 Paris	Team
Bronze medal – third place	2020 Tokyo	Team
World Championship
Gold medal – first place	2018 Hamburg	Team
Silver medal – second place	2022 Dubai	Team
Bronze medal – third place	2026 Ottawa	Team

James Palmer (born 22 April 1997) is a British wheelchair basketball player and a member of British men's national wheelchair basketball team.

== Career ==
Palmer competed at the 2018 Wheelchair Basketball World Championship and helped Great Britain win their first gold medal in Wheelchair Basketball World Championship history. At 21 years old, he was the youngest player on the team.

He represented Great Britain at the 2020 Summer Paralympics and won a bronze medal in wheelchair basketball. He again represented Great Britain at the 2024 Summer Paralympics and won a silver medal in wheelchair basketball.

In September 2026, he competed at the 2026 Wheelchair Basketball World Championships and won a bronze medal.
