= Mercy Nyakundi =

Canadian wheelchair basketball player (born 2005)

- Nyakundi at the 2026 Wheelchair Basketball World Championships

Personal information
- Born: December 3, 2005 (age 20) Hamilton, Ontario, Canada
- Education: University of Texas at Arlington

Sport
- Sport: Wheelchair basketball
- Disability: Spina bifida
- Disability class: 2.5
Medal record
Women's wheelchair basketball
Representing Canada
World Championship
Silver medal – second place	2026 Ottawa	Team

Mercy Nyakundi (born December 3, 2005) is a Canadian wheelchair basketball player and a member of Canada women's national wheelchair basketball team.

== Early life ==
Nyakundi was born with spina bifida. In 2017, she moved from Kenya to Canada, along with her mother, older brother and younger sister. Her father, Thomas Omwenga, is a marathon runner and had previously moved to Canada to further his running career.

== Career ==
In August 2025, Nyakundi made her senior national team debut at the 2025 Americas Cup and helped Canada win a bronze medal.

In August 2026, she was selected to represent Canada at the 2026 Wheelchair Basketball World Championships. On September 15, 2026, during the final group stage game against Great Britain, she recorded ten points and seven rebounds off the bench in a 92–91 double overtime victory to help Canada finish atop Group A with a perfect 5–0 record.
