= Lindsey Zurbrugg =

American wheelchair basketball player

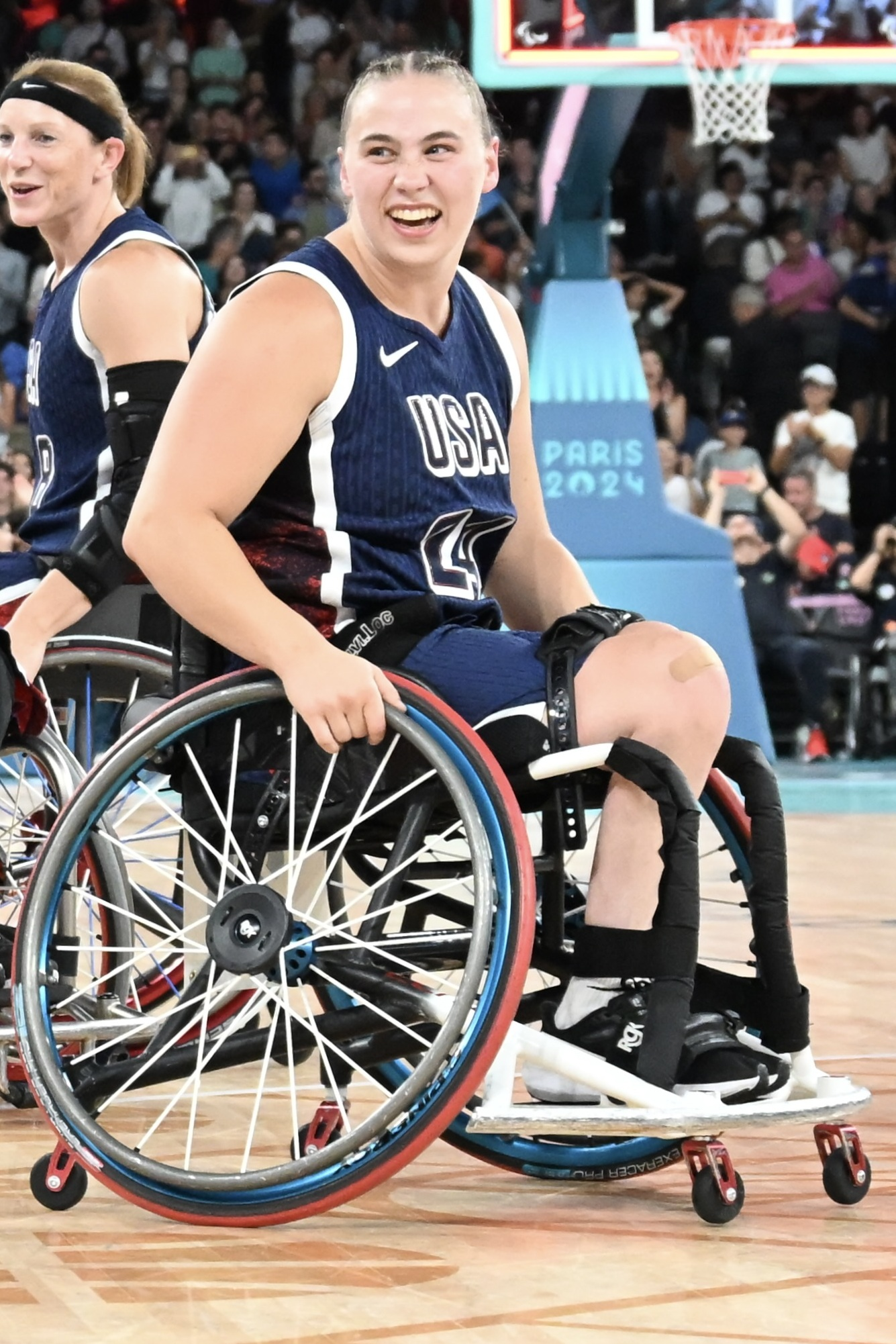
- Zurbrugg at the 2024 Summer Paralympics

Personal information
- Full name: Lindsey Alma Zurbrugg
- Born: September 22, 1998 (age 28) Hillsboro, Oregon, U.S.
- Height: 5 ft 4 in (1.63 m)

Sport
- Sport: Wheelchair basketball
- Disability class: 2.5
- Coached by: Christina Schwab
Medal record
Representing the United States
Women's wheelchair basketball
Paralympic Games
Silver medal – second place	2024 Paris	Team
Bronze medal – third place	2020 Tokyo	Team
World Championship
Gold medal – first place	2026 Ottawa	Team
Bronze medal – third place	2022 Dubai	Team
Parapan American Games
Gold medal – first place	2023 Santiago	Team
Silver medal – second place	2019 Lima	Team
U25 Women's World Championships
Gold medal – first place	2019 Suphanburi	Team

Lindsey Alma Zurbrugg (born September 22, 1998) is an American wheelchair basketball player and a member of the United States women's national wheelchair basketball team. She represented the United States at the 2020 and 2024 Summer Paralympics. Zurbrug is now on the University of Alabama's women's wheelchair basketball staff as an assistant coach and a registered dietitian within Alabama Adapted Athletics.

== Career ==
Zurbrugg represented the United States at the 2018 Wheelchair Basketball World Championship and finished in sixth place in the tournament. In August 2019, she competed at the 2019 Parapan American Games in the wheelchair basketball tournament and won a silver medal.

Zurbrugg represented the United States at the 2020 Summer Paralympics in the wheelchair basketball women's tournament and won a bronze medal.

She again represented the United States at the 2022 Wheelchair Basketball World Championships and won a bronze medal.

In November 2023, she competed at the 2023 Parapan American Games in the wheelchair basketball tournament and won a gold medal. As a result, the team earned an automatic bid to the 2024 Summer Paralympics. On March 30, 2024, she was named to Team USA's roster to compete at the 2024 Summer Paralympics.
