= Ben Fox (basketball) =

British wheelchair basketball player (born 1995)

- Fox at the 2024 Summer Paralympics

Personal information
- Born: 15 August 1995 (age 31)

Sport
- Sport: Wheelchair basketball
- Disability class: 3.5
Medal record
Men's wheelchair basketball
Representing Great Britain
Paralympic Games
Silver medal – second place	2024 Paris	Team
Bronze medal – third place	2020 Tokyo	Team
World Championship
Silver medal – second place	2022 Dubai	Team
Bronze medal – third place	2026 Ottawa	Team
European Championship
Gold medal – first place	2019 Rotterdam	Team

Ben Fox (born 15 August 1995) is a British wheelchair basketball player and a member of British men's national wheelchair basketball team.

== Career ==
Fox made his senior national team debut for Great Britain at the 2019 IWBF Men's European Championship and won a gold medal.

He represented Great Britain at the 2020 Summer Paralympics and won a bronze medal in wheelchair basketball. He again represented Great Britain at the 2024 Summer Paralympics and won a silver medal in wheelchair basketball.

He competed at the 2022 Wheelchair Basketball World Championships, which was delayed until June 2023, and won a silver medal. In September 2026, he competed at the 2026 Wheelchair Basketball World Championships and won a bronze medal.
