= Emily Oberst =

American wheelchair basketball player

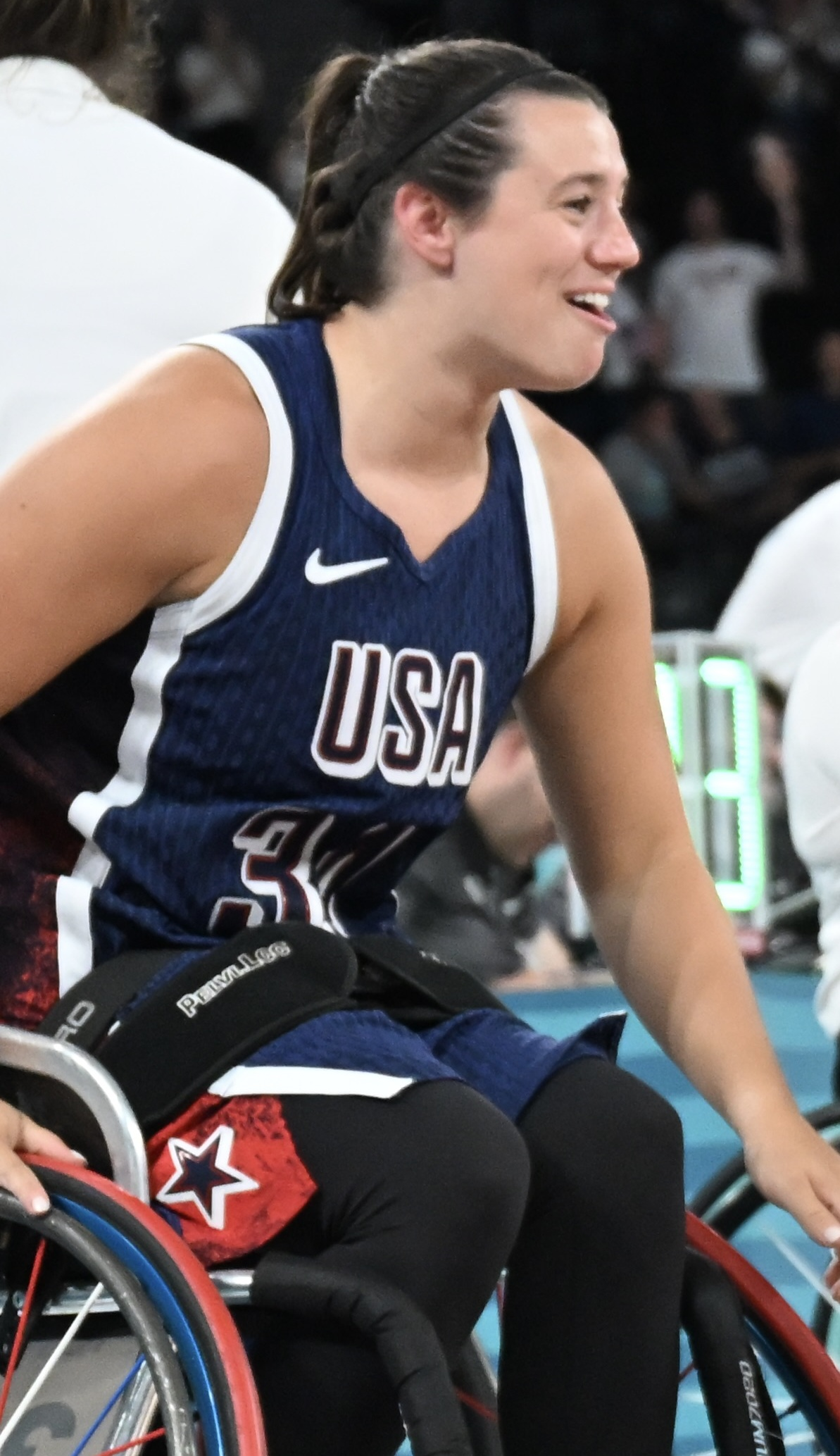
- Oberst at the 2024 Summer Paralympics

Personal information
- Full name: Emily Ann Oberst
- Born: August 27, 1998 (age 28) Brookfield, Wisconsin, U.S.

Sport
- Sport: Wheelchair basketball
- Disability class: 4.5
- College team: University of Alabama
- Coached by: Christina Schwab
Medal record
Women's wheelchair basketball
Paralympic Games
Silver medal – second place	2024 Paris	Team
World Championship
Gold medal – first place	2026 Ottawa	Team
Bronze medal – third place	2022 Dubai	Team
Parapan American Games
Gold medal – first place	2023 Santiago	Team
U25 Women's World Championships
Gold medal – first place	2019 Suphanburi	Team

Emily Ann Oberst (born August 27, 1998) is an American wheelchair basketball player and a member of the United States women's national wheelchair basketball team. She represented the United States at the 2024 Summer Paralympics.

== Early life and education ==
Oberst was diagnosed with Ewing sarcoma in her left leg at age 12 that forced her to have a surgery to replace her fibula as her tibia. Prior to her cancer diagnosis, she played basketball, softball, golf and ran track. After almost two years of surgeries, chemotherapy and rehabilitation she was cancer free and able to use her legs. However, due to extensive bone surgery, she would not be able to run or play sports as she used to.

She transitioned to play wheelchair basketball throughout high school for the varsity Junior Bucks team. She was recruited to play basketball for the University of Alabama at age 17. She then transferred to the University of Illinois Urbana-Champaign, where she finished her career as a college athlete.

== Career ==
Oberst made her international debut for the United States at the 2018 Wheelchair Basketball World Championship and finished in sixth place in the tournament. In May 2019, she represented the U25 Women's team at the 2019 Women's U25 Wheelchair Basketball World Championship and won a gold medal.

She represented the United States at the 2022 Wheelchair Basketball World Championships and won a bronze medal.

In November 2023 she competed at the 2023 Parapan American Games in the wheelchair basketball tournament and won a gold medal. As a result, the team earned an automatic bid to the 2024 Summer Paralympics. On March 30, 2024, she was named to Team USA's roster to compete at the 2024 Summer Paralympics.
