= Filippo Carossino =

Italian wheelchair basketball player (born 1993)

- At the 2026 Wheelchair Basketball World Championships in Ottawa

Personal information
- Born: 30 September 1993 (age 32) Arenzano, Italy

Sport
- Sport: Wheelchair basketball
- Disability class: 3.5
Medal record
Men's wheelchair basketball
Representing Italy
World Championship
Silver medal – second place	2026 Ottawa	Team

Filippo Carossino (born 30 September 1993) is an Italian wheelchair basketball player and a member of Italy men's national wheelchair basketball team.

== Early life ==
In 2007, Carossino was ran over by a driver, resulting in having both of his legs amputated above the knee.

== Professional career ==
At the club level, Carossino helped Briantea84 win the Serie A titles eight times between 2016 and 2026. With this team, he also helped them win the Coppa Italia and Supercoppa Italiana seven times apiece.

== National team career ==
In 2014, Carossino helped the Italy U22 national team win the bronze medal at the U22 European Championship, in which he scored 20 points in the bronze medal match against Turkey.

In June 2018, Carossino was selected to represent Italy at the 2018 Wheelchair Basketball World Championship. He also took part in the 2022 Wheelchair Basketball World Championships where his team finished in fifth place.

During the 2025 European Championships, where his team finished in fourth place, Carrossino posted averages of 14.1 points, 5.8 rebounds and 3.8 assists. His team's results led Italy to qualify for the 2026 Wheelchair Basketball World Championships. In the knockout stage, he scored 19 points and posted 9 rebounds, while in the quarterfinals, he scored 26 points, helping his team win both of these games. In the semifinals, Italy advanced to the finals by defeating Great Britain 63–59, with Carossino himself scoring 23 points. His team would lose to Australia in the final.
