= Ylonne Post =

Dutch wheelchair basketball player

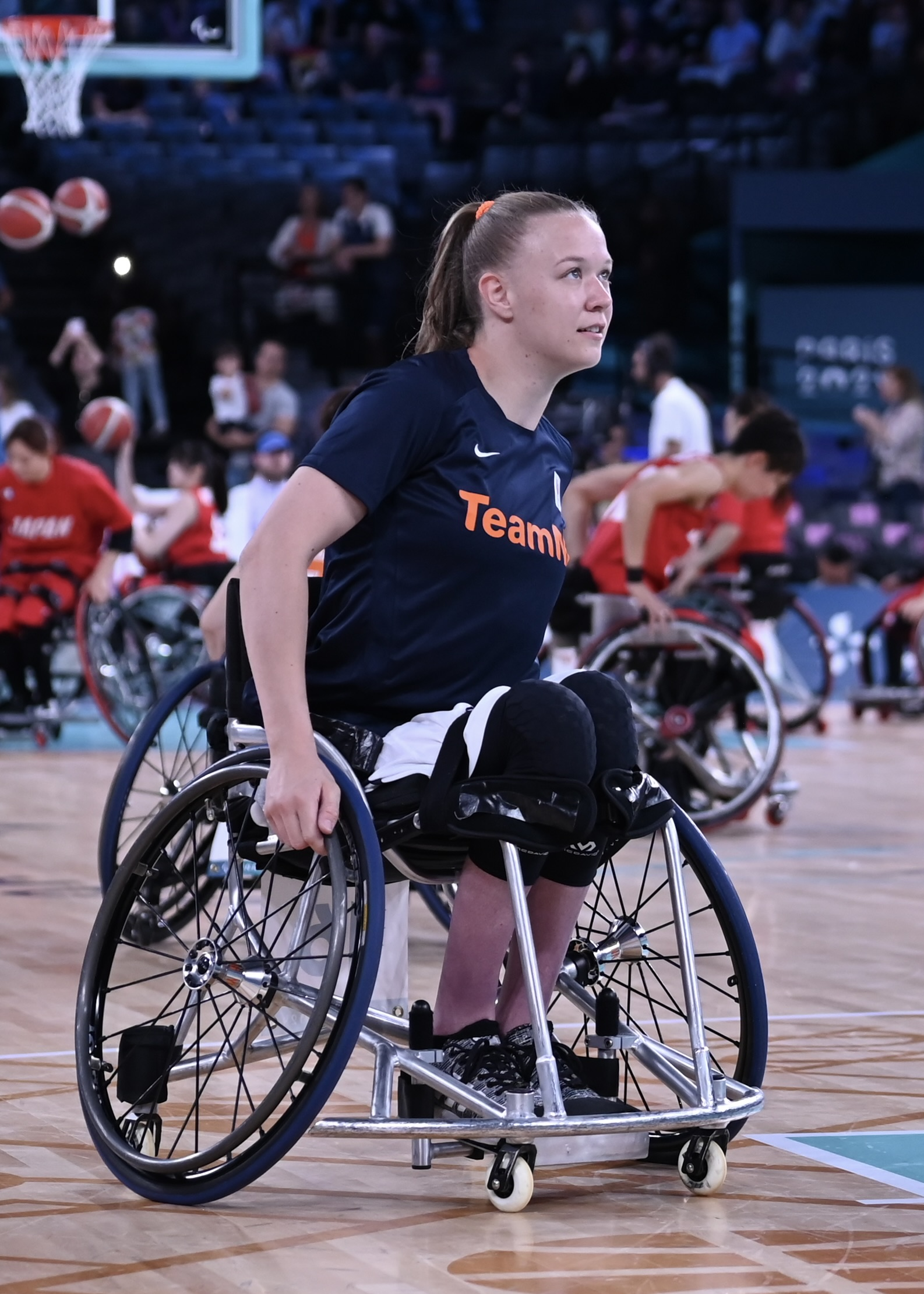
- Post at the 2024 Summer Paralympics

Personal information
- Born: 16 December 2001 (age 24)
- Home town: Utrecht, Netherlands

Sport
- Country: Netherlands
- Sport: Wheelchair basketball
- Disability class: 1.0
Medal record
Women's wheelchair basketball
Representing the Netherlands
Paralympic Games
Gold medal – first place	2024 Paris	Team
World Championship
Gold medal – first place	2022 Dubai	Team
Bronze medal – third place	2026 Ottawa	Team

Ylonne Post (born 16 December 2001) is a Dutch wheelchair basketball player. She represented the Netherlands at the 2024 Summer Paralympics.

== Career ==
Post represented the Netherlands at the 2024 Summer Paralympics in wheelchair basketball and won a gold medal.
