= Alejandra Ibáñez =

American wheelchair basketball player

Personal information
- Nickname: Ali
- Born: January 26, 2000 (age 26) Salt Lake City, Utah, U.S.
- Height: 4 ft 10 in (1.47 m)

Sport
- Sport: Wheelchair basketball
- Disability: Arthrogryposis
- Disability class: 2.5
- College team: University of Illinois
- Coached by: Stephanie Wheeler; Trooper Johnson
Medal record
Women's wheelchair basketball
Representing the United States
Paralympic Games
Silver medal – second place	2024 Paris	Team
Bronze medal – third place	2020 Tokyo	Team
World Championship
Bronze medal – third place	2022 Dubai	Team
Parapan American Games
Silver medal – second place	2019 Lima	Team
U25 Women's World Championships
Gold medal – first place	2019 Suphanburi	Team
Gold medal – first place	2023 Bangkok	Team

Alejandra Ibáñez (born January 26, 2000) is an American wheelchair basketball player. She represented the United States at the 2020 and 2024 Summer Paralympics.

== Career ==
Ibáñez made her international debut for the United States at the 2018 Wheelchair Basketball World Championship.

Ibáñez represented the United States at the 2020 Summer Paralympics in the wheelchair basketball women's tournament and won a bronze medal.

She represented the United States at the 2022 Wheelchair Basketball World Championships and won a bronze medal.

On March 30, 2024, she was named to Team USA's roster to compete at the 2024 Summer Paralympics.
