= Bethany Johnson =

Canadian wheelchair basketball player

Personal information
- Nationality: Canada
- Born: November 29, 2001 (age 24) Winnipeg, Manitoba, Canada

Sport
- Sport: Wheelchair basketball
- Disability class: 4.0
- Event: Women's team
- College team: University of Illinois at Urbana–Champaign
Medal record
Women's wheelchair basketball
Representing Canada
World Championship
Silver medal – second place	2026 Ottawa	Team
Parapan American Games
Silver medal – second place	2023 Santiago	Team

Bethany Johnson (born 29 November 2001) is a Canadian 4.0 point wheelchair basketball player. She was part of the under 25 national team at the 2023 Women's U25 Wheelchair Basketball World Championship in Bangkok, and the senior Canadian national women's team at the 2023 Parapan American Games in Santiago, Chile, in 2023, and the 2024 Summer Paralympics in Paris in 2024.

== Biography ==
Bethany Johnson was born in Winnipeg, Manitoba, on 29 November 2001. She played curling, winning a local club championship in Winnipeg. During the summer between grades seven and eight, she developed a slipped capital femoral epiphysis. Afterward, she switched to wheelchair basketball as a 4.0 point player. She attended the University of Manitoba from 2019 to 2023, where she majored in kinesiology. As of 2025, she attends the University of Illinois at Urbana–Champaign.

Johnson was part of the under 25 national team at the 2023 Women's U25 Wheelchair Basketball World Championship in Bangkok, and the senior Canadian national women's team at the 2023 Parapan American Games in Santiago, Chile, in 2023, where the Canadian national team won silver, and the 2024 Summer Paralympics in Paris in 2024. She also represented Team Manitoba in canoe-kayak at the 2022 Canada Summer Games in Niagara.
