= Ixhelt González =

American wheelchair basketball player

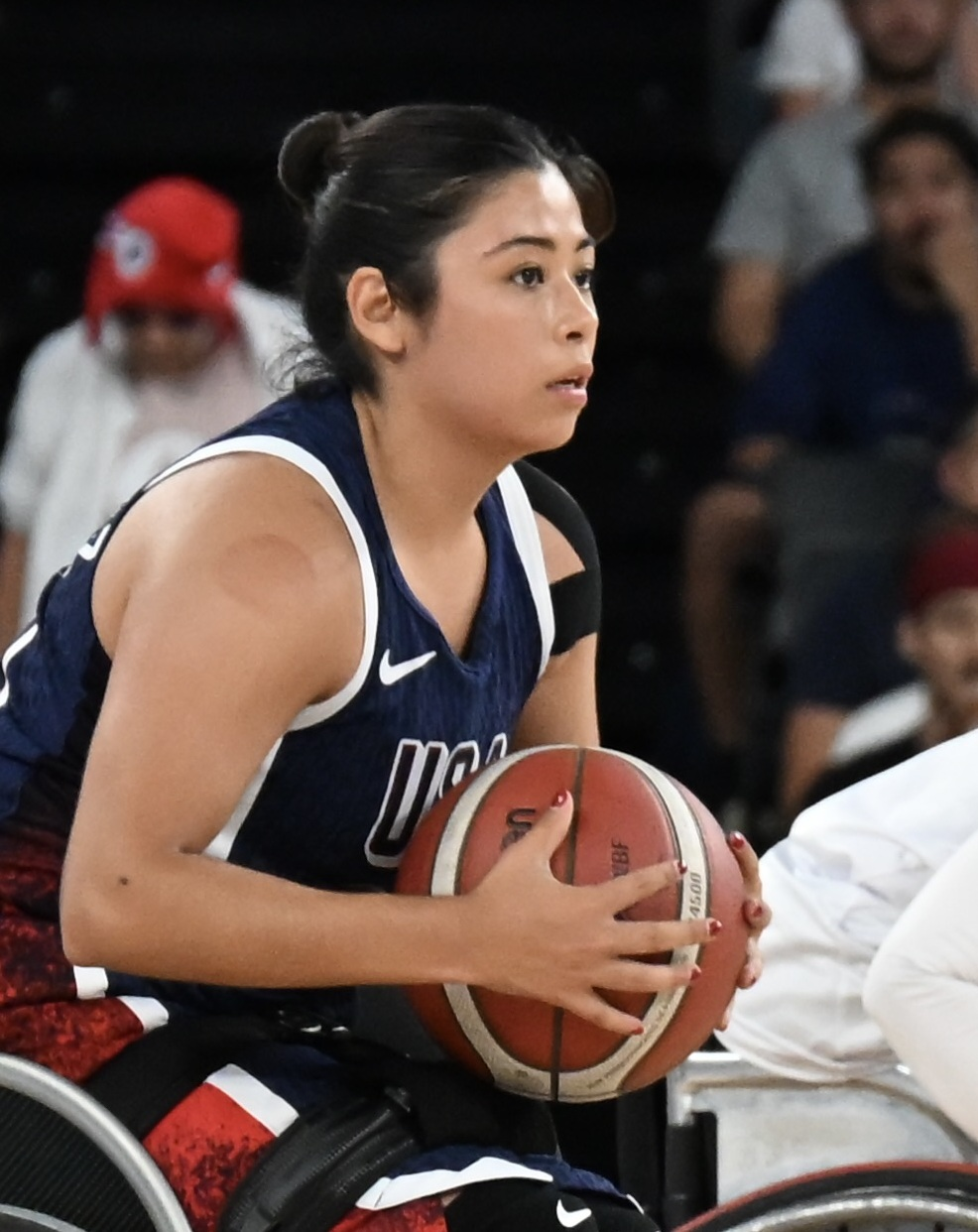
- González at the 2024 Summer Paralympics

Personal information
- Born: June 1, 2004 (age 22) Oak Lawn, Illinois, U.S.
- Height: 5 ft 2 in (1.57 m)

Sport
- Sport: Wheelchair basketball
- Disability: Femoral anteversion
- Disability class: 4.5
- Coached by: Robert Taylor
Medal record
Representing the United States
Women's wheelchair basketball
Paralympic Games
Silver medal – second place	2024 Paris	Team
Bronze medal – third place	2020 Tokyo	Team
World Championship
Gold medal – first place	2026 Ottawa	Team
Bronze medal – third place	2022 Dubai	Team
Parapan American Games
Gold medal – first place	2023 Santiago	Team
U25 Women's World Championships
Gold medal – first place	2019 Suphanburi	Team
Gold medal – first place	2023 Bangkok	Team

Ixhelt González (born June 1, 2004) is an American wheelchair basketball player and a member of the United States women's national wheelchair basketball team. She represented the United States at the 2020 and 2024 Summer Paralympics.

== Career ==
At the age of 13, González represented the United States at the 2018 Wheelchair Basketball World Championship and finished in sixth place in the tournament. She was the youngest member on the team. González represented the United States at the 2020 Summer Paralympics in the wheelchair basketball women's tournament and won a bronze medal.

She again represented the United States at the 2022 Wheelchair Basketball World Championships and won a bronze medal.

In November 2023 she competed at the 2023 Parapan American Games in the wheelchair basketball tournament and won a gold medal. As a result, the team earned an automatic bid to the 2024 Summer Paralympics. On March 30, 2024, she was named to Team USA's roster to compete at the 2024 Summer Paralympics.

== Personal life ==
González attended St. Francis de Sales High School in Chicago, Illinois. She was diagnosed with femoral anteversion, which causes her hips and feet to twist inward but does not require her to use a wheelchair in her daily life. She started playing wheelchair basketball with the Chicago Park District's Skyhawks team.
