= Katie Morrow =

British wheelchair basketball player

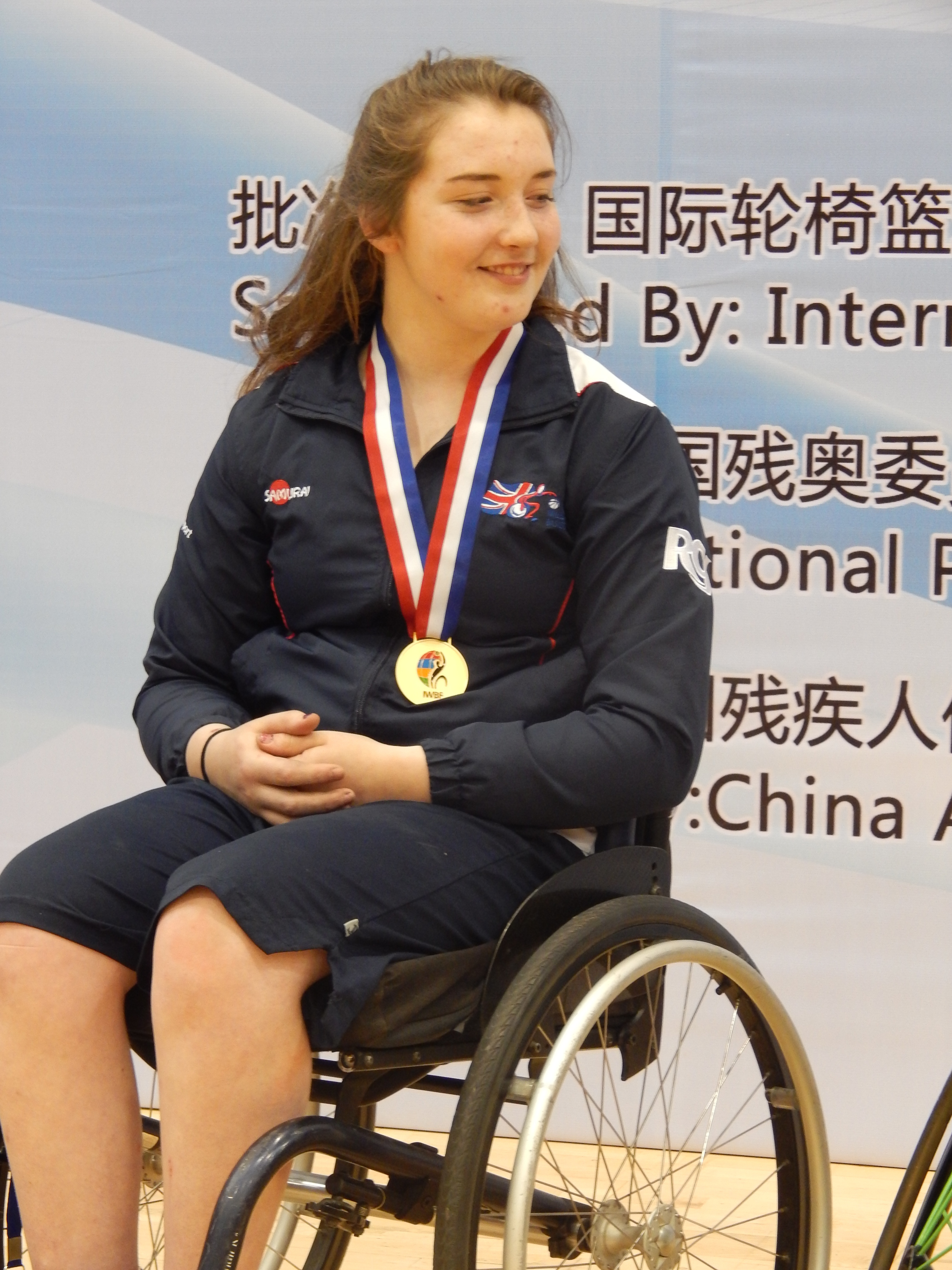
- Katie Morrow at the 2015 Women's U25 Wheelchair Basketball World Championship in Beijing

Personal information
- Full name: Katie Anne Morrow
- Born: 20 September 1999 (age 27)

Sport
- Country: Great Britain
- Sport: Wheelchair basketball
- Disability class: 4.5
- Event: Women's team
- Club: Sheffield Steelers
Medal record
Women's wheelchair basketball
Representing Great Britain
U25 World Championships
Gold medal – first place	2015 Beijing	Team
Silver medal – second place	2023 Bangkok	Team
Bronze medal – third place	2019 Suphanburi	Team
European Championships
Silver medal – second place	2025 Sarajevo	Team
Bronze medal – third place	2015 Worcester	Team

Katie Anne Morrow (born 20 September 1999) is a 4.5 point British wheelchair basketball player who was the youngest player selected for Team GB wheelchair basketball team at the 2016 Summer Paralympics in Rio de Janeiro.

== Career ==
Katie Morrow was born on 20 September 1999. She has an older brother. She is from County Antrim in Northern Ireland. She attended Cullybackey College.

As a swimmer, she broke the Irish record in her age group in the freestyle relay event in 2012. She was introduced to wheelchair basketball in 2013 by Phil Robinson, the Wheelchair Basketball Performance Officer at Disability Sport Northern Ireland. She soon played in the Lord's Taverners Junior League, the BWB National Leagues, the National Junior Championships, the Celtic Cup, and Sainsbury's School Games. As of 2016, she is a 4.5 point player, who plays for the Sheffield Steelers in the Women's League and Knights WBC in the National League.

Morrow made her debut with the senior national team at the Continental Clash in 2015, and later that year made her international debut as part of the U25 team at the 2015 Women's U25 Wheelchair Basketball World Championship in Beijing, where it won gold. The European Wheelchair Basketball Championship followed this in Worcester, where Great Britain won bronze, and the 2016 Osaka Cup, where it won silver. She won the Mid and East Antrim Borough Council Junior Sportsperson of the Year award in March 2016, and in May 2016, she was named as part of Team GB for the 2016 Summer Paralympics in Rio de Janeiro. At 16, she was the youngest player on the team. The British team produced its best ever performance at the Paralympics, making it all the way to the semi-finals, but lost to the semi-final to the United States, and then the bronze medal match to the Netherlands.

== Achievements ==
- 2015: Gold at the 2015 Women's U25 Wheelchair Basketball World Championship (Beijing, China)
- 2015: Bronze at the European Championships (Worcester, England)
