= Xena Wimmenhoeve =

Dutch wheelchair basketball player

Personal information
- Born: 14 May 2000 (age 26)

Sport
- Country: Netherlands
- Sport: Wheelchair basketball
Medal record
Paralympic Games
Gold medal – first place	2020 Tokyo	Team
Gold medal – first place	2024 Paris	Team
World Championship
Bronze medal – third place	2026 Ottawa	Team
European Championship
Gold medal – first place	2017 Tenerife	Team
Gold medal – first place	2019 Rotterdam	Team
Gold medal – first place	2021 Madrid	Team

Xena Wimmenhoeve (born 14 May 2000) is a Dutch wheelchair basketball player

== Career ==
Wimmenhoeve began playing wheelchair basketball in early 2017 and made her debut for the national team in 2017 at the European championships.

She has won three gold medals at the European Basketball Championships in 2017, 2019 and 2021.

She has won gold medals at the Paralympic Games in 2020 and 2024.
