= United States women's national wheelchair basketball team =

American sports team

United States
- IWBF zone: Americas
- Coach: Christina Schwab

Paralympic Games
- Medals: Gold: 1988, 1996, 2004, 2008, 2016; Silver: 1992, 2024; Bronze: 1968, 1980, 2020

World Championships
- Appearances: 8
- Medals: Gold: 1990, 2010, 2026; Silver: 1994, 1998, 2002, 2006; Bronze: 2014, 2022
Home	Away

The United States women's national wheelchair basketball team began in the mid-1960s. The first women's team to compete alongside men in the Paralympic Games was in the inaugural 1968 tournament. A few years later in 1977, a women's wheelchair basketball division was created in the National Wheelchair Basketball Association (NWBA).

== History ==
The United States women's national wheelchair basketball team began in the mid-1960s. The first women's team to compete alongside men in the Paralympic Games was in the inaugural 1968 tournament. A few years later in 1977, a women's wheelchair basketball division was created in the National Wheelchair Basketball Association (NWBA).

In December 2021, Trooper Johnson resigned as head coach of the women’s national team after current and former players alleged emotional misconduct. He said he would cooperate with a United States Center for SafeSport investigation, and believed there would not be any findings.

== Roster ==
=== 2024 Summer Paralympics ===
The following is the United States roster in the women's wheelchair basketball tournament of the 2024 Summer Paralympics.

United States women's national wheelchair basketball team - 2024 Summer Paralympics roster
Players
Coaches

No.	Name	Age – Date of birth	Pts.
1	Alejandra Ibáñez	24 – 26 January 2000	2.5
4	Abigail Bauleke	23 – 31 July 2001	1.5
7	Josie Aslakson	28 – 14 September 1995	1.0
8	Natalie Schneider	41 – 11 February 1983	4.5
12	Rebecca Murray	34 – 15 March 1990	2.5
15	Rose Hollermann	28 – 25 December 1995	3.5
21	Kaitlyn Eaton	30 – 17 August 1994	1.5
24	Lindsey Zurbrugg	25 – 22 September 1998	2.5
34	Emily Oberst	26 – 27 August 1998	4.5
43	Bailey Moody	22 – 16 November 2001	4.0
54	Ixhelt Gonzalez	20 – 1 June 2004	4.5
55	Courtney Ryan	33 – 21 September 1990	2.0

Head coach

Robert Taylor

Assistant coach(es)

Scott Meyer

Legend

- Age - describes age on 28 August 2024

=== 2020 Summer Paralympics ===
United States women's national wheelchair basketball team - 2020 Summer Paralympics roster
Players
Coaches

No.	Name	Age – Date of birth	Pts.
1	Alejandra Ibanez	21 – 26 January 2000	2.5	(United States)
3	Abigail Bauleke	20 – 31 July 2001	1.5	(United States)
4	Zoe Voris	22 – 4 December 1998	3.5	(United States)
5	Darlene Hunter	39 – 16 April 1982	1.0	(United States)
7	Josie Aslakson	25 – 14 September 1995	1.0	(United States)
8	Natalie Schneider	38 – 11 February 1983	4.5	(United States)
15	Rose Hollermann	25 – 25 December 1995	3.5	(United States)
21	Kaitlyn Eaton	27 – 17 August 1994	1.5	(United States)
24	Lindsey Zurbrugg	22 – 22 September 1998	2.5	(United States)
43	Bailey Moody	19 – 16 November 2001	4.0	(United States)
54	Ixhelt Gonzalez	17 – 1 June 2004	4.5	(United States)
55	Amy Spangler	30 – 21 September 1990	2.0	(United States)

Head coach

Trooper Johnson

Assistant coach(es)

Amy Spangler, Adam Kramer

Legend

- Age - describes age on 24 August 2021

=== 2019 ParaPan American Games Team ===
Team USA at the 2019 Parapan American Games consisted of:

Name	Home town
Josie Aslakson	Jordan, Minnesota
Megan Blunk	Gig Harbor, WA
Abby Dunkin	New Braunfels, TX
Kaitlyn Eaton	Houston, TX
Rose Hollermann	Elysian, MN
Darlene Hunter	Commerce, MI
Alejandra Ibanez	Salt Lake City, UT
Bailey Moody	Alpharetta, GA
Rebecca Murray	Germantown, WI
Courtney Ryan	Chula Vista, CA
Natalie Schnieder	Ord, NE
Lindsey Zurbrugg	Portland, OR

- Coach: Trooper Johnson
