= Laura Davoli =

Australian wheelchair basketball player (born 2005)

- Davoli in 2023

Personal information
- Born: 3 August 2005 (age 21) Melbourne, Victoria

Sport
- Country: Australia
- Sport: Wheelchair basketball
- Position: Forward
- Disability class: 4.5
- Event: Women's team
- College team: University of Texas at Arlington Lady Movin Mavs
- Club: Victorian Wonders

Laura Davoli (born 3 August 2005) is a 4-point wheelchair basketball player who plays forward. She represented Australia at the 2022 Wheelchair Basketball World Championships in Dubai, the 2023 Women's U25 Wheelchair Basketball World Championship in Thailand and the 2026 Wheelchair Basketball World Championships in Ottawa.

== Biography ==
In action at the 2026 Wheelchair Basketball World Championships in Ottawa

Laura Davoli was born on 3 August 2005. She played tennis and participated in competitive swimming but found she preferred wheelchair basketball. When she was 12 she participated in the Victorian State Development Program (SDP) once a week for three hours on a Sunday but then gave it up for a while. When she was 15, she joined the U25 SDP.

This was followed by selection for the Gliders team for the 2022 Wheelchair Basketball World Championships in Dubai and the Devil's team for the 2023 Women's U25 Wheelchair Basketball World Championship in Thailand. She also competed at the Oceania Women's Basketball Championships, where she won gold, and the 2026 Wheelchair Basketball World Championships in Ottawa. She coached young players in Diamond Valley.

In 2026, she averaged 18 points, 9 rebounds and 5 assists per game, she became part of the UT Arlington Mavericks women's wheelchair basketball (Lady Movin' Mavs) team at the University of Texas at Arlington as a freshman studying psychology. She was one of two women on the UT Arlington team competing at the 2026 Wheelchair Basketball World Championships in Ottawa in September 2026.
