= Ilse Arts =

Dutch wheelchair basketball player (born 1990)

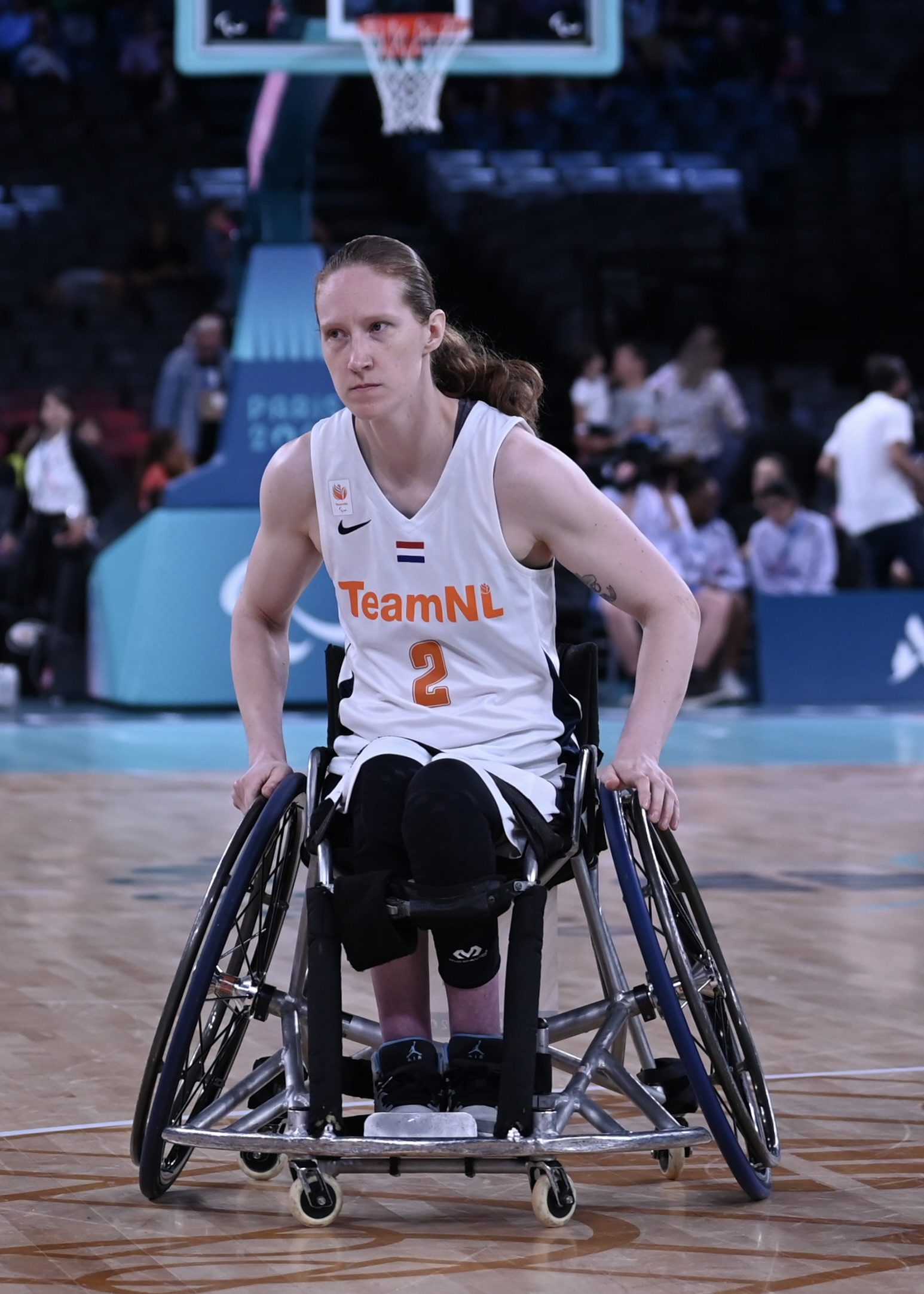

Personal information
- Nationality: Dutch
- Born: 7 June 1990 (age 36)

Sport
- Country: Netherlands
- Sport: Women's Wheelchair Basketball
- Disability class: 1.5

Achievements and titles
- Paralympic finals: 2020 Tokyo Paralympics, 2016 Summer Paralympics
Medal record
Women's wheelchair basketball
Representing Netherlands
Paralympic Games
Gold medal – first place	2020 Tokyo	Team
Gold medal – first place	2024 Paris	Team
World Championship
Bronze medal – third place	2026 Ottawa	Team

Ilse Arts (born 7 June 1990) is a Dutch wheelchair basketball player. She won a gold medal at the 2020 Summer Paralympics, gold medal at the 2018 world championships and multiple gold medals at the European Championships (2017, 2019, 2021)

== Career ==
She won a bronze medal at the 2016 Summer Paralympics.

She played at the 2017 Women's Wheelchair Basketball European Championship and 2018 Wheelchair Basketball World Championship (World Champions).

She is from Wijchen, Netherlands. She played association football for SC Woezik. She was injured after a motorcycle accident.

She currently plays for BBC Münsterland in the 1. Rollstuhlbasketball-Bundesliga, she transferred from the Hot Rolling Bears Essen in the 2. Rollstuhlbasketball-Bundesliga.
