= Lucinda Bueti =

21st-century Australian wheelchair basketball player

- At the 2026 Wheelchair Basketball World Championships

Personal information
- Nationality: Australia
- Born: 5 January 1994 (age 32) Adelaide, South Australia

Sport
- Country: Australia
- Sport: Wheelchair basketball
- Position: Forward
- Disability class: 4.0
- Event: Women's team
- Club: Adelaide Thunder

Lucinda Bueti (born 5 January 1994) is a 4-point wheelchair basketball player who plays forward. She represented Australia at the 2022 Wheelchair Basketball World Championships in Dubai and the 2026 Wheelchair Basketball World Championships in Ottawa.

== Biography ==
Lucinda Bueti was born in Adelaide, South Australia, on 5 January 1994. In 2015, she suffered a workplace injury to her knee while stacking shelves in a warehouse when a shelf fell on her. This left her in great pain. She was diagnosed with complex regional pain syndrome (CRPS), a condition that left her in a wheelchair and taking strong medications. After six years of unsuccessful treatments, she decided to take the drastic step of having the leg amputated. This ended the pain and allowed her to work again.

In addition, Bueti found wheelchair basketball, and she set her sights on playing at the elite level. Return to Work helped her procure the required special chair and found a physiothera[pist to help her build her body up to the required level. She started playing at The Lights Community and Sports Centre in Adelaide on Tuesday nights. One of the national coaches saw a video of her playing, and she got an invitation to play in The Classics, an annual wheelchair basketball competition in Queensland. From there, she made the Australian women's national wheelchair basketball team, known as the Gliders. She is a 4 point player.

Bueti was part of the Gliders team that played at the Osaka Cup in Japan in 2022, and again in 2026. She then played with the Gliders at the 2022 Wheelchair Basketball World Championships in Dubai, and the 2026 Wheelchair Basketball World Championships in Ottawa.
