= Melanie Hawtin =

Canadian wheelchair basketball player

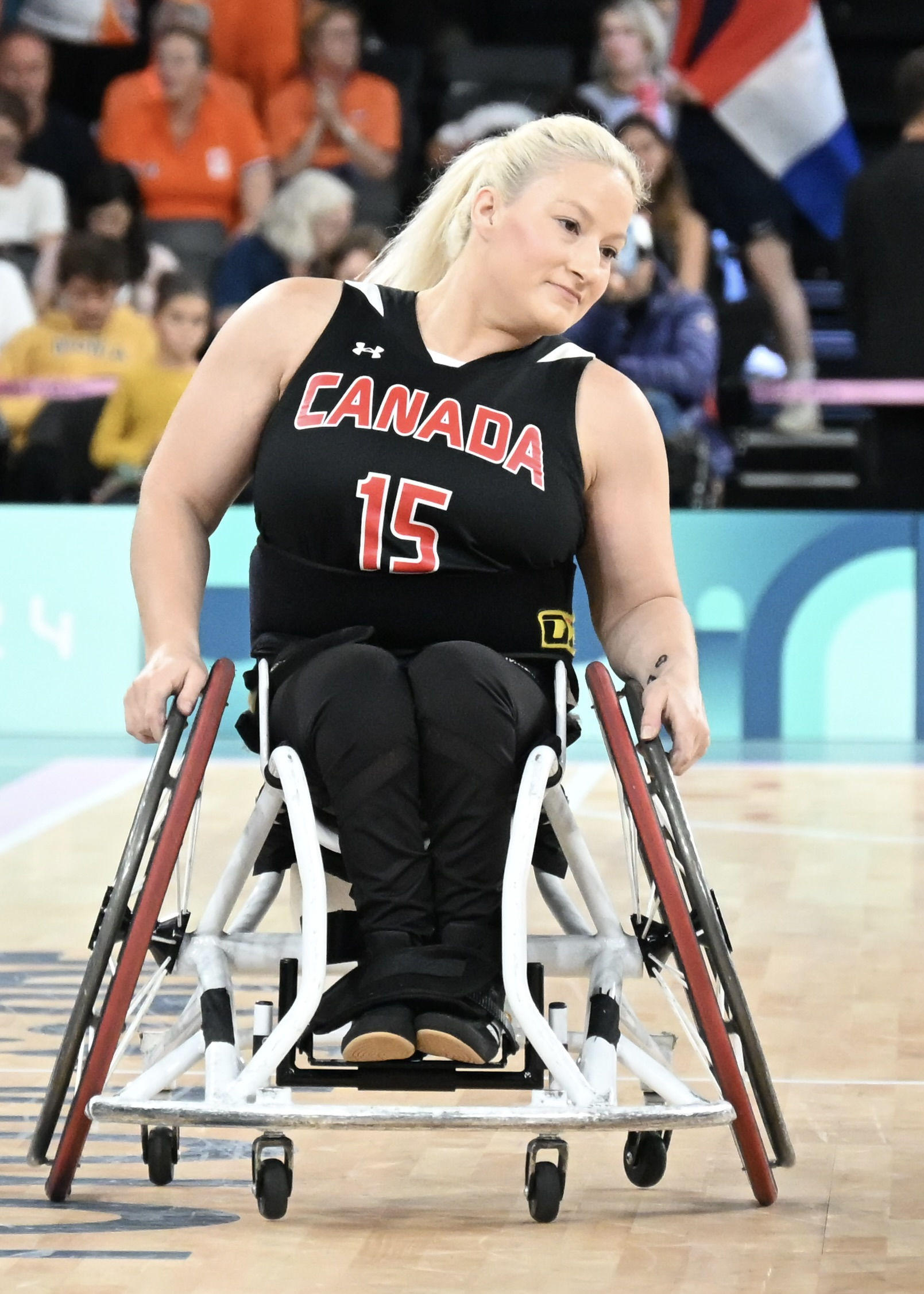
- Hawtin at the 2024 Summer Paralympics

Personal information
- Nationality: Canada
- Born: July 20, 1988 (age 38) Hamilton, Ontario
- Height: 4 ft 8 in (142 cm)

Sport
- Sport: Wheelchair racing Wheelchair basketball
- Disability class: T54 (wheelchair racing); 1.5 (wheelchair basketball)
- Team: BC Breakers
Medal record
Women's wheelchair basketball
Representing Canada
World Championship
Gold medal – first place	2014 Toronto	Team
Silver medal – second place	2026 Ottawa	Team
Parapan American Games
Silver medal – second place	2015 Toronto	Team
Silver medal – second place	2023 Santiago	Team

Melanie Hawtin (born July 20, 1988) is a Canadian 1.5 point wheelchair basketball player. As a T54 class wheelchair racer, she was the Canadian national champion in the 100 m in 2008, and the 400 m and 1500 m events in 2009. She was Ontario Wheelchair Sports Association's Junior Female Athlete of the Year four times, and its Female Athlete of the Year twice. After switching to wheelchair basketball in 2012, she won a gold medal at the 2014 Women's World Wheelchair Basketball Championship in Toronto.

== Early life ==
Melanie Hawtin was born in Hamilton, Ontario. She has spina bifida, and began wheelchair racing when she was five years old. By age ten, she was participating in national championships, and she won two bronze medals in 2001 in the T54 class.

== Awards and honours ==
She was Ontario Wheelchair Sports Association's Junior Female Athlete of the Year in 1999, 2002, 2003, and 2004, and its Female Athlete of the Year in 2005 and 2007. She was the national champion in the 100 m in 2008, and the 400 m and 1500 m events in 2009.

== Surgery ==
Then, in April 2012, she was told that she would need surgery for hydrocephalus. A buildup of fluid in her head was putting pressure on her brain. The surgery was successful, but left her unable to bend over, and therefore participate in her sport, for a long time. Offered a facial tissue, she said that she would need a whole box.

== Comeback in 2013 ==
However, wheelchair basketball is played in an upright posture. Hawtin joined the Burlington Vipers, and played for Team Ontario in the CWBL Women's National Championships in 2013 and 2014. She was selected for the national team at its training camp in Las Vegas in January 2014, something she had never achieved as a wheelchair racer. She was part of the team that won a gold medal at the 2014 Women's World Wheelchair Basketball Championship in Toronto in July 2014, and silver at the 2015 Parapan American Games in August 2015.

== Statistics ==
Statistics
Competition	Season	Matches	FGM-A	FG%	3PM-A	3P%	FTM-A	FT%	OR-DR	AST	PTS	Source
World Championships	2014	7	2–6	33	0–0	0	1–1	1	1–1	0	5	

Key
FGM, FGA, FG%: field goals made, attempted and percentage	3PM, 3PA, 3P%: three-point field goals made, attempted and percentage
FTM, FTA, FT%: free throws made, attempted and percentage	OR, DR: offensive, defensive rebounds
PTS: points	AST: assists
