= Trooper Johnson =

American wheelchair basketball coach and player

Personal information
- Nationality: United States
- Born: San Lorenzo, California
Medal record
Summer Paralympics
Wheelchair basketball
Bronze medal – third place	1996 Summer Paralympics	Wheelchair basketball
Bronze medal – third place	2000 Summer Paralympics	Wheelchair basketball

Lawrence "Trooper" Johnson is a former Paralympic coach for the United States women's national wheelchair basketball team and former wheelchair basketball player. He won a bronze medal with Team USA at the 1996 Summer Paralympics and 2000 Summer Paralympics. In December 2021, he resigned as head coach of the women's national team after players alleged emotional misconduct. He said he would cooperate with a United States Center for SafeSport investigation, and believed there would not be any findings.

== Early life ==
Johnson was born to a military family and grew up on military base camps. Once able to drive, Johnson crashed his car into a tree in a drunk driving incident but remained unscathed. His paralyzation happened once he attempted to dislodge his jeep from the tree, causing it to run him over. About a year after the crash, Johnson began playing wheelchair basketball, but stopped to continue his education until 1989.

== Career ==
=== Playing career ===
In 1989, Johnson joined the Golden State 76ers, now called the Golden State Road Warriors, a men's wheelchair basketball team. From 1990 until 2004, Johnson competed with the United States men's national wheelchair basketball team at various international competitions. With the team, he won a bronze medal at the 1996 Summer Paralympics by scoring eight points in a 66–60 win over Spain. The next year, Johnson was named the 1997 National Wheelchair Basketball Association's (NWBA) Most Valuable Player after averaging 29 points per game. He also led the Golden State Road Warriors to their first Final Four in 1997 and was named MVP in 1998 at the first wheelchair basketball game played during the NBA Jam at the NBA All-Star Game. That same year, he became the second paraplegic to climb El Capitan.

He would later take home another bronze medal from the 2000 Summer Paralympics. Johnson was appointed captain of the Golden State Warriors team for 24 years, where he set the record for the most three-point field goals in a game. His shooting and play making ability has been compared to that of Michael Jordan.

=== Coaching career ===
Johnson was appointed an assistant coach for the 2013 U.S. Men's U23 and U.S. Women's U21 at the Junior ParaPan American Games. He was later promoted to assistant coach of the United States women's national wheelchair basketball team from 2013 until 2016. In March 2016, he was inducted into the NWBA Hall of Fame.

The next year, Johnson was promoted to head coach of the United States women's national wheelchair basketball team from 2017 until 2020. While serving as coach, Johnson also sat on the board of directors for the Northern California Olympians and Paralympians, as the Sports Program Coordinator for the Bay Area Outreach and Recreation Program, and head coach of the Junior Road Warriors Wheelchair Basketball Team.

In December 2021, Johnson resigned as head coach of the women's national team after current and former players alleged emotional misconduct. He said he would cooperate with a United States Center for SafeSport investigation, and believed there would not be any findings.
