= Anne Patzwald =

German wheelchair basketball player

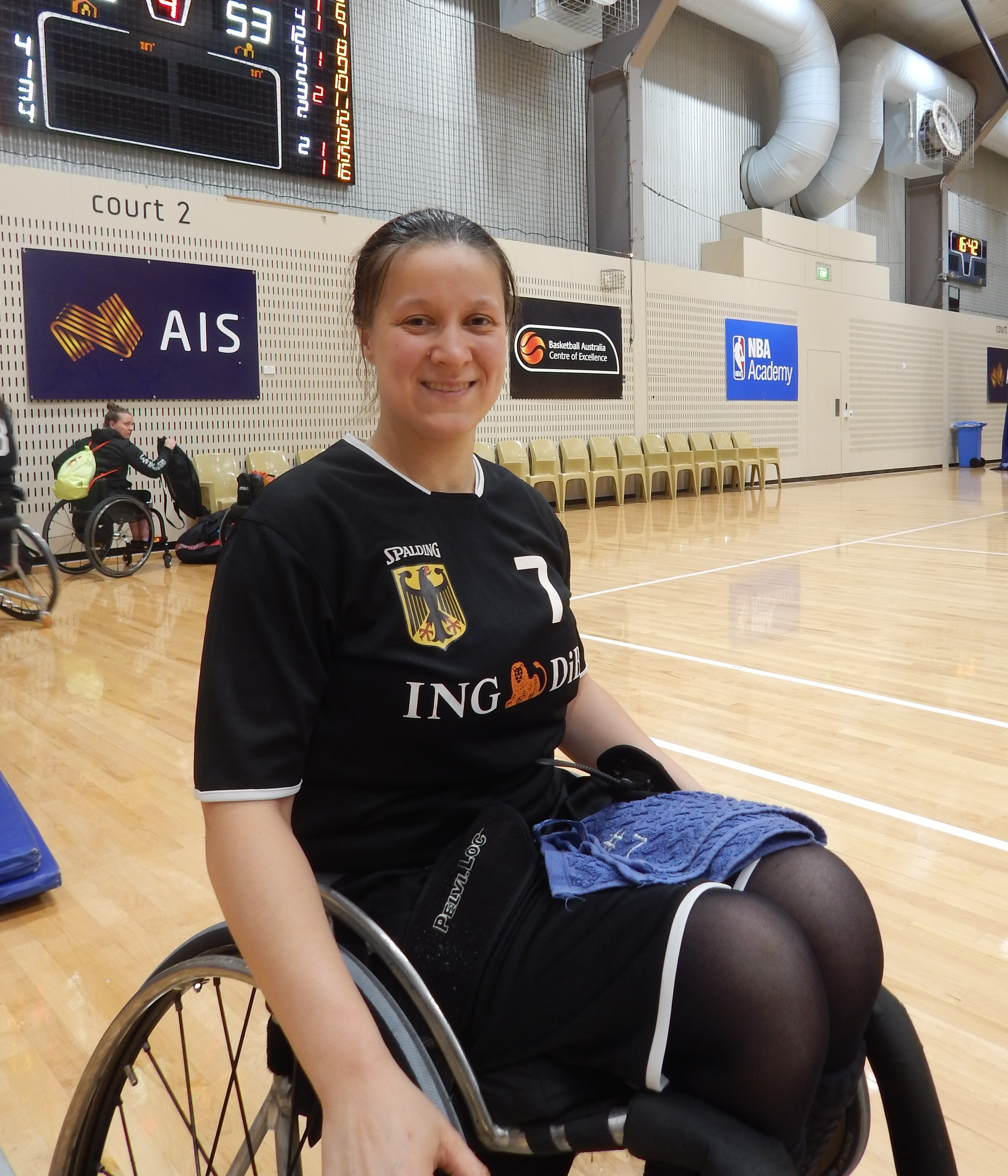
- Patzwald at the Australian Institute of Sport in Canberra, 2018

Personal information
- Nationality: Germany
- Born: 2 July 1989 (age 37) Guben, East Germany

Sport
- Sport: Wheelchair basketball
- Disability class: 1.0
- Event: Wheelchair Basketball
- Team: BG Baskets Hamburg
- Coached by: Martin Otto

Achievements and titles
- Paralympic finals: 2016 Paralympics
Medal record
Wheelchair basketball
Paralympic Games
Silver medal – second place	2016 Rio de Janeiro	Women's Wheelchair basketball
IWBF World Championship
Bronze medal – third place	2018 Hamburg, Germany	Women's wheelchair basketball

Anne Patzwald (born 2 July 1989, in Guben, East Germany) is a German 1.0 point wheelchair basketball player, who played for the German national team at the 2016 Summer Paralympics in Rio de Janeiro, winning silver. President Joachim Gauck awarded the team Germany's highest sporting honour, the Silbernes Lorbeerblatt (Silver Laurel Leaf).

== Biography ==
Anne Patzwald was born in Guben on 2 July 1989. She became a paraplegic after an accident. She began playing wheelchair basketball in 2012. Playing sport was a part of her rehabilitation, and she considered wheelchair basketball, table tennis and badminton. When she returned home, she found that one of her neighbours played wheelchair basketball, and began playing in the local league too.

Patzwald is graded a 1.0 point player. She was selected as part of the under 25 national team in 2013, and the senior team the following year. In 2015, she won gold with the team in the European Championship in Worcester, England. She made her Paralympic debut at the 2016 Summer Paralympic Games in Rio de Janeiro, where the German team won silver. President Joachim Gauck awarded the team Germany's highest sporting honour, the Silbernes Lorbeerblatt (Silver Laurel Leaf) in 2016.

Patzwald trained as an occupational therapist at a school in Bielefeld-Eckardtsheim that did not require school fees and was wheelchair accessible. Since September 2017, she has worked at BG Klinikum Hamburg. The clinic has a record of hiring athletes, who double as role models, and is generous allowing them to take time off for national team training and competitions. Its staff includes fellow national wheelchair basketball team member Maya Lindholm, paracanoeist (and former team member) Edina Müller, and former team member Simone Kues.

== Achievements ==
- 2015: Gold at European Championships (Worcester, England)
- 2016: Silver at the Paralympic Games (Rio de Janeiro, Brazil)
- 2017: Silver European Championships (Tenerife, Spain)
- 2018: Bronze at the World Championships (Hamburg, Germany)
