= Svenja Erni =

German wheelchair basketball player

Personal information
- Born: 9 July 2003 (age 23) Laupheim, Germany

Sport
- Sport: Wheelchair basketball
- Club: Doneck Dolphins Trier
Medal record
Representing Germany
IWBF European Championship
Bronze medal – third place	2019 Rotterdam	Team
Summer Universiade
Gold medal – first place	2025 Rhine-Ruhr	Wheelchair 3x3

Svenja Marie Erni (born 9 July 2003) is a German wheelchair basketball player who competes in international basketball competitions. She is a Universiade champion and European bronze medalist. She has competed at the 2024 Summer Paralympics.
