= Isabel Martin (wheelchair basketball) =

Australian wheelchair basketball player

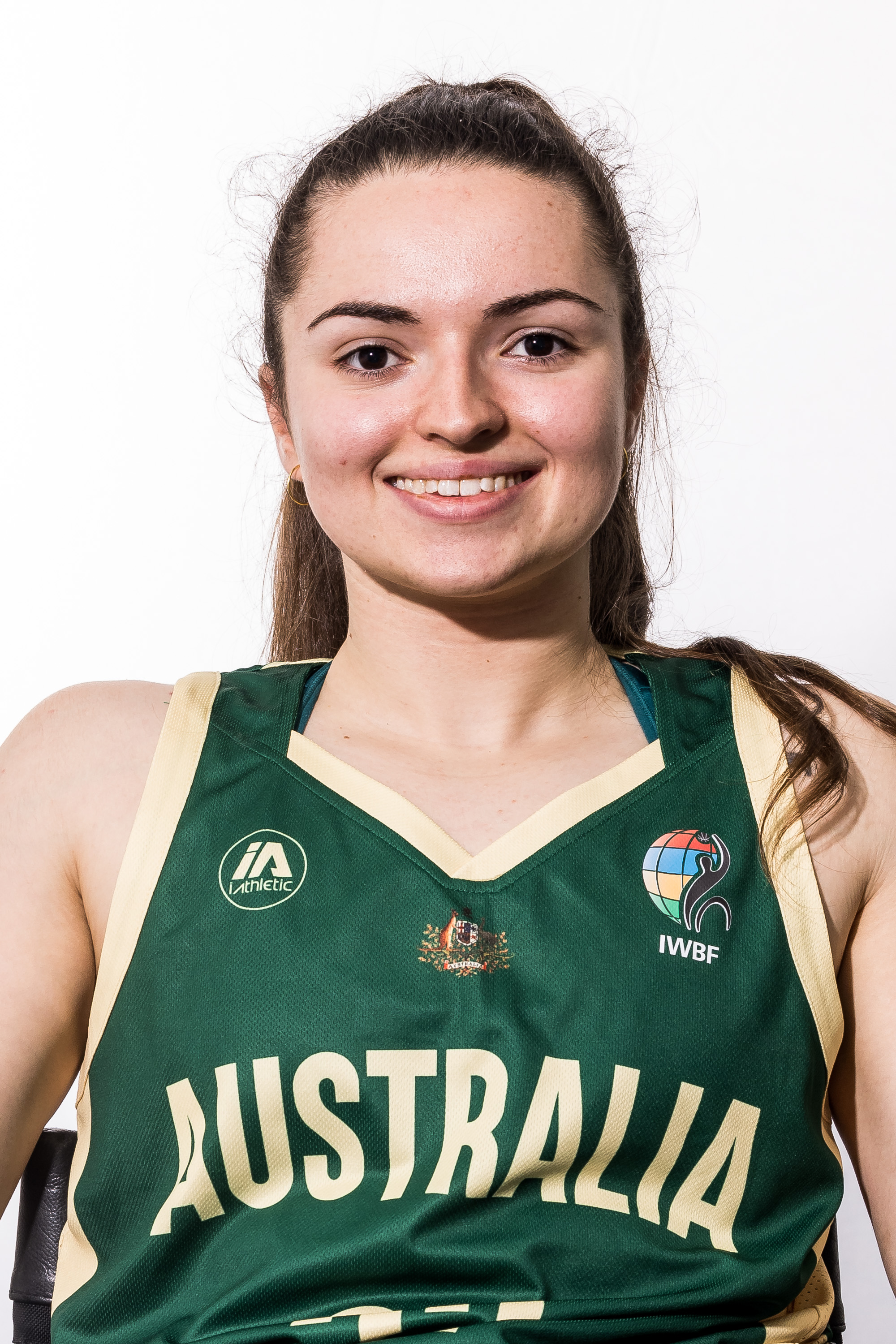
- Isabel Martin in 2023

Personal information
- Nickname: Issy
- Born: 11 March 1999 (age 27)

Sport
- Country: Australia
- Sport: Wheelchair basketball
- Disability class: 1.0
- Event: Women's team
- Club: Kilsyth Cobras
Medal record
Wheelchair basketball
U25 Women's World Championships
Silver medal – second place	2019 Suphanburi, Thailand	Women's wheelchair basketball

Isabel Martin (born 11 March 1999) is a 1.0 point Australian wheelchair basketball player. She made her international debut with the Australian women's national wheelchair basketball team (the Gliders) at the Osaka Cup in February 2016. In May 2019, she was part of the Australian U25 team (the Devils) that won silver at the 2019 Women's U25 Wheelchair Basketball World Championship in Suphanburi, Thailand. She represented Australia at the 2020 Summer Paralympics in Tokyo and the 2022 Wheelchair Basketball World Championships in Dubai.

== Biography ==
Isabel Martin was born on 11 March 1999. She became paraplegic when she was eight months old as a result of surgery to remove a benign tumour in her spinal cord.

A 1.0 point, Martin played for the Kilsyth Cobras in the Women's National Wheelchair Basketball League in 2016. She made her international debut at the Osaka Cup in February 2016. The Gliders came third in the series against Japan, Great Britain and Germany. She was the youngest player on the team. She was named to the Osaka Cup team again in January 2017. She was also named to the U18 Victorian side for the Kevin Coombs Cup in April 2017, and the U23 side in 2019. In May 2019, she was part of the Australians U25 team (the Devils) that won silver at the 2019 Women's U25 Wheelchair Basketball World Championship in Suphanburi, Thailand.

At the 2020 Tokyo Paralympics, the Gliders finished ninth after winning the 9th-10th classification match. She was Basketball Victoria's Wheelchair Athlete of the Year for 2020. In June 2023, she was a member of the Gliders team at the 2022 Wheelchair Basketball World Championships in Dubai.

Isabel has since joined the University of Alabama women's wheelchair basketball team as of April 2025.

WNWBL Statistics - Seasons 2017-
Competition	Season	M	FGM-A	FG%	3PM-A	3P%	FTM-A	FT%	PTS	OFF	DEF	TOT	AST	PTS	ref
WNWBL	2018	15	11 - 51	21.57	--	--	1 - 6	16.67	23	1.73	1.33	3.07	0.33	1.53	
WNWBL	2017	15	11 - 44	25	--	--	1 - 5	20	23	0.87	1.67	2.53	0.2	1.53	
WNWBL	2016	18	2 - 34	5.88	--	--	- 2	--	4	0.94	1.28	2.22	0.11	0.22	
