= Puisand Lai =

Canadian wheelchair basketball player

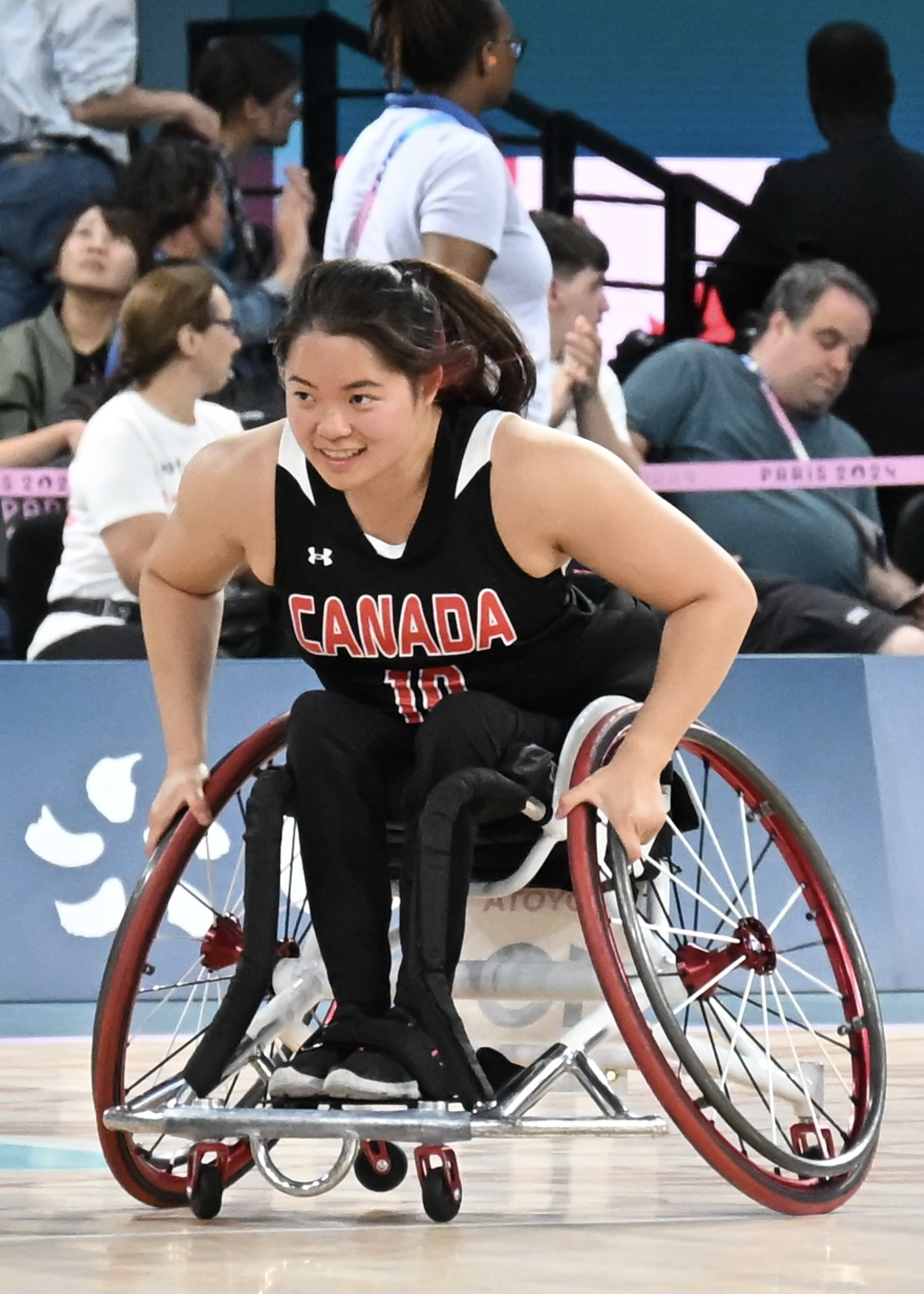
- Lai at the 2024 Summer Paralympics

Personal information
- Nationality: Canada
- Born: July 29, 2000 (age 26) Honolulu County, Hawaii
- Height: 5 ft 2 in (1.57 m)

Sport
- Sport: Wheelchair basketball
- Disability class: 1.0
- Event: Women's team
Medal record
Women's wheelchair basketball
Representing Canada
World Championship
Silver medal – second place	2026 Ottawa	Team
Parapan American Games
Gold medal – first place	2019 Lima	Team
Silver medal – second place	2023 Santiago	Team

Puisand Lai (born July 29, 2000) is a Canadian wheelchair tennis and 1.0 point wheelchair basketball player. In 2018, she was part of the Canadian national women's wheelchair basketball team at the 2018 Wheelchair Basketball World Championship in Hamburg.

== Biography ==
Puisand Lai was born in Honolulu County, Hawaii, on July 29, 2000. When she was six years old, she was diagnosed with transverse myelitis, a rare neurological condition in which the spinal cord is inflamed.

In October 2013, Lai joined the Mississauga Little Aces program, a project supported by Tennis Canada and run by Albert Fong of Mississagua Little Aces, which teaches tennis to children from ages six to sixteen, and children with disabilities from ages eight to nineteen. Lai was soon able to play with non-disabled children.

In July 2014, she represented Tennis Canada in the International Tennis Federation Americas Junior Wheelchair Tennis Camp, one of only three such camps worldwide. By 2017, she was ranked 7th in the ITF rankings for girls' wheelchair tennis, and 73rd in the women's. She was a member of Canada's 2017 World Team Cup junior team, competing in Sardinia, Italy after the team earned a wild card spot from the International Tennis Federation.

Lai also participated in sledge hockey, sailing and wheelchair basketball, where she was classified as a 1.0 point player, and began playing competitively in 2014. She was noticed by Kathy Ludwig, the Ontario coach, who asked her to join Team Ontario. In 2018, she was part of the Canadian national women's wheelchair basketball team at the 2018 Wheelchair Basketball World Championship in Hamburg.

As of 2018, she is studying engineering at McMaster University.
