= Christina Schwab =

American Paralympic athlete

Personal information
- Nationality: United States
- Born: Christina Ripp; July 31, 1980 (age 45)
- Education: University of Illinois ('05)
Medal record
Wheelchair basketball
Paralympic Games
Gold medal – first place	2004 Greece	wheelchair basketball
Gold medal – first place	2008 China	wheelchair basketball
Gold medal – first place	2016 Rio	wheelchair basketball
U.S. Paralympic championships
Gold medal – first place	2002	wheelchair basketball
Gold medal – first place	2003	wheelchair basketball
Gold medal – first place	2004	wheelchair basketball
IWBF Gold Cup
Silver medal – second place	2006	Team
Gold medal – first place	2010	Team
Joseph F. Lyttle Tournament
Gold medal – first place	2008	Team
North American Cup
Gold medal – first place	2008	Team
Wheelchair racing
IPC World Championships
Bronze medal – third place	2006	1500 m
U.S. Paralympic Trials
Bronze medal – third place	2012	track and field

Christina Schwab (née Ripp) (born July 31, 1980) is an American former Paralympic basketball player and distance track/road racer and current head coach of the United States women's national wheelchair basketball team.

== Playing career ==
Schwab started competing for Paralympic Games in 2000 where she got into the 5th place at the 2000 Summer Paralympics. Four years later she won a gold medal in Athens, Greece for wheelchair basketball competition and in 2008 she won her second gold in Beijing, China. She was also awarded gold at International Wheelchair Basketball Federation Gold Cup and won bronze medal in track and field trials. She used to get first place at National championships from 2002 to 2004. In 2006, Christina won a silver medal at IWBF Gold Cup and bronze one at IPC World Championships. She also got into the first place at Boston Marathon which was in 2003 and five years later got the same spot at the North American Cup.

== Coaching career ==
On December 13, 2021, Schwab was named head coach of the United States women's national wheelchair basketball team.

== Personal life ==
In December 2005, Schwab received a bachelor's degree in community health from the University of Illinois. Schwab then moved to Colorado and helped start the Denver Rolling Nuggets, a women's wheelchair basketball team. In 2011, she married CJ Schwab and they reside in Edgerton, Wisconsin. Schwab is currently working towards her master's degree while coaching the women's wheelchair basketball team at the University of Wisconsin-Whitewater.
