= Wheelchair basketball at the 2016 Summer Paralympics – Women's team rosters =

This is a list of players that participated in the women's wheelchair basketball competition at the 2016 Summer Paralympics.

== Group A ==
=== Argentina ===
The following is the Argentina roster in the women's wheelchair basketball tournament of the 2016 Summer Paralympics.

=== Brazil ===
The following is the Brazil roster in the women's wheelchair basketball tournament of the 2016 Summer Paralympics.

Brazil women's national basketball team – 2016 Summer Olympics roster
Players
Coaches

Pos.	No.	Name	Age – Date of birth	Pts.	Club	Ctr.
C	4	Silva, Ivanilde	26 – April 24, 1990	3.5	IREFES	(Brazil)
G	5	Farias, Andreia	30 – April 23, 1986	1.0	ADM	(Brazil)
C	6	Assunção, Perla	30 – January 28, 1986	2.0	Allstar Rodas	(Brazil)
G	7	Costa, Lucicléia	36 – August 16, 1980	2.5	Allstar Rodas	(Brazil)
G	8	Ramos, Rosália	46 – January 22, 1970	1.5	Riopretense	(Brazil)
C	9	Rosa, Ana Aurélia	27 – September 10, 1988	3.5	Riopretense	(Brazil)
C	10	Santana, Jéssica	23 – December 7, 1992	2.5	IREFES	(Brazil)
F	11	Vieira, Geisa	24 – August 27, 1992	4.0	GAADIN	(Brazil)
F	12	Martins, Lia	29 – June 9, 1987	4.5	GAADIN	(Brazil)
G	13	Maia, Geisiane	34 – February 15, 1982	3.0	IREFES	(Brazil)
F	14	Klokler, Paola	25 – January 26, 1991	4.0	ADDECE	(Brazil)
F	14	Almeida, Vileide	24 – November 2, 1991	4.5	Allstar Rodas	(Brazil)

Head coach

- (Brazil) Martoni Sampaio

Assistant coach(es)

- (Brazil) Francilídio de Andrade Soares

Legend

- Club – describes last
  club before the tournament
- Age – describes age
  on 7 September 2016

=== Canada ===
The following is the Canada roster in the women's wheelchair basketball tournament of the 2016 Summer Paralympics.

Canada women's national wheelchair basketball team - 2016 Summer Paralympics roster
Players
Coaches

No.	Name	Age – Date of birth	Pts.
4	Tamara Steeves	26 – 23 September 1989	1.5
5	Janet McLachlan	39 – 26 August 1977	4.5
6	Arinn Young	25 – 10 July 1996	4.5
7	Cindy Ouellet	27 – 8 December 1988	3.5
8	Rosalie Lalonde	19 – 27 March 1997	3.0
9	Amanda Yan	28 – 22 May 1988	3.0
10	Katie Harnock	33 – 12 August 1983	2.0
11	Darda Sales	34 – 1 September 1982	4.0
12	Tracey Ferguson	18 – 17 September 1997	3.0
13	Jamey Jewells	27 – 23 August 1989	1.0
14	Erica Gavel	25 – 25 May 1991	4.5
15	Melanie Hawtin	28 – 20 July 1988	1.0

Head coach

Bill Johnson

Assistant coach(es)

Michael Broughton, Katie Miyazaki

Legend

- Age - describes age on 7 September 2016

=== Great Britain ===
The following is the Great Britain roster in the women's wheelchair basketball tournament of the 2016 Summer Paralympics.

Great Britain women's national wheelchair basketball team – 2016 Summer Paralympics roster
Players
Coaches

Pos.	No.	Name	Age – Date of birth	Pts.
G	4	Charlotte Moore	17 – 13 September 1998
G	5	Sophie Carrigill	22 – 19 January 1994
G	6	Clare Griffiths	36 – 18 September 1979
G	7	Helen Freeman	26 – 23 November 1989
G	8	Laurie Williams	24 – 4 February 1992
F	9	Judith Hamer	25 – 3 December 1990
F	10	Amy Conroy	23 – 22 October 1992
F	11	Katie Morrow	16 – 20 September 1999
G	12	Leah Evans	19 – 5 March 1997
F	13	Jordanna Bartlett	21 – 15 December 1994
G	14	Joy Haizelden	25 – 6 December 1990
G	15	Robyn Love	26 – 28 August 1990

Head coach

- (United States) Miles Thompson

Assistant coach(es)

- (United States) Dan Price

Legend

- Club – describes last club before the tournament
- Age – describes age on 10 September 2016

=== Germany ===
The following is the Germany roster in the women's wheelchair basketball tournament of the 2016 Summer Paralympics.

== Group B ==
=== Algeria ===
The following is the Algeria roster in the women's wheelchair basketball tournament of the 2016 Summer Paralympics.

Algeria women's national wheelchair basketball team – 2016 Summer Paralympics roster
Players
Coaches

Pos.	No.	Name	Age – Date of birth	Pts.
F	4	Nebia Mehimda	31 – 31 July 1985
G	5	Naoual Khedir	29 – 13 June 1987
F	6	Yamina Ghoul	44 – 30 August 1972
C	7	Menouba Foulani	35 – 15 March 1981
F	8	Houria Moussa	28 – 13 December 1987
G	9	Djamila Khemgani	34 – 12 January 1982
F	10	Halima Kedjoun	30 – 23 January 1986
F	11	Dahbia Semati	40 – 6 September 1976
C	12	Kheira Zairi	31 – 28 September 1984
F	13	Zohra Sellami	34 – 14 March 1982
G	14	Samiha Abdelali	28 – 25 April 1988
C	15	Nourhane Boublal	23 – 23 June 1993

Head coach

- (Algeria) Djawed Zigh

Assistant coach(es)

- (Algeria) Mohammed Tahar Kisrane

Legend

- Club – describes last club before the tournament
- Age – describes age on 10 September 2016

=== China ===
The following is the China roster in the women's wheelchair basketball tournament of the 2016 Summer Paralympics.

=== France ===
The following is the France roster in the women's wheelchair basketball tournament of the 2016 Summer Paralympics.

=== Netherlands ===
The following is the Netherlands roster in the women's wheelchair basketball tournament of the 2016 Summer Paralympics.

=== United States ===
The following is the Netherlands roster in the women's wheelchair basketball tournament of the 2016 Summer Paralympics.
