= 2015 Women's U25 Wheelchair Basketball World Championship =

2015 Women's World Wheelchair Basketball World Championship
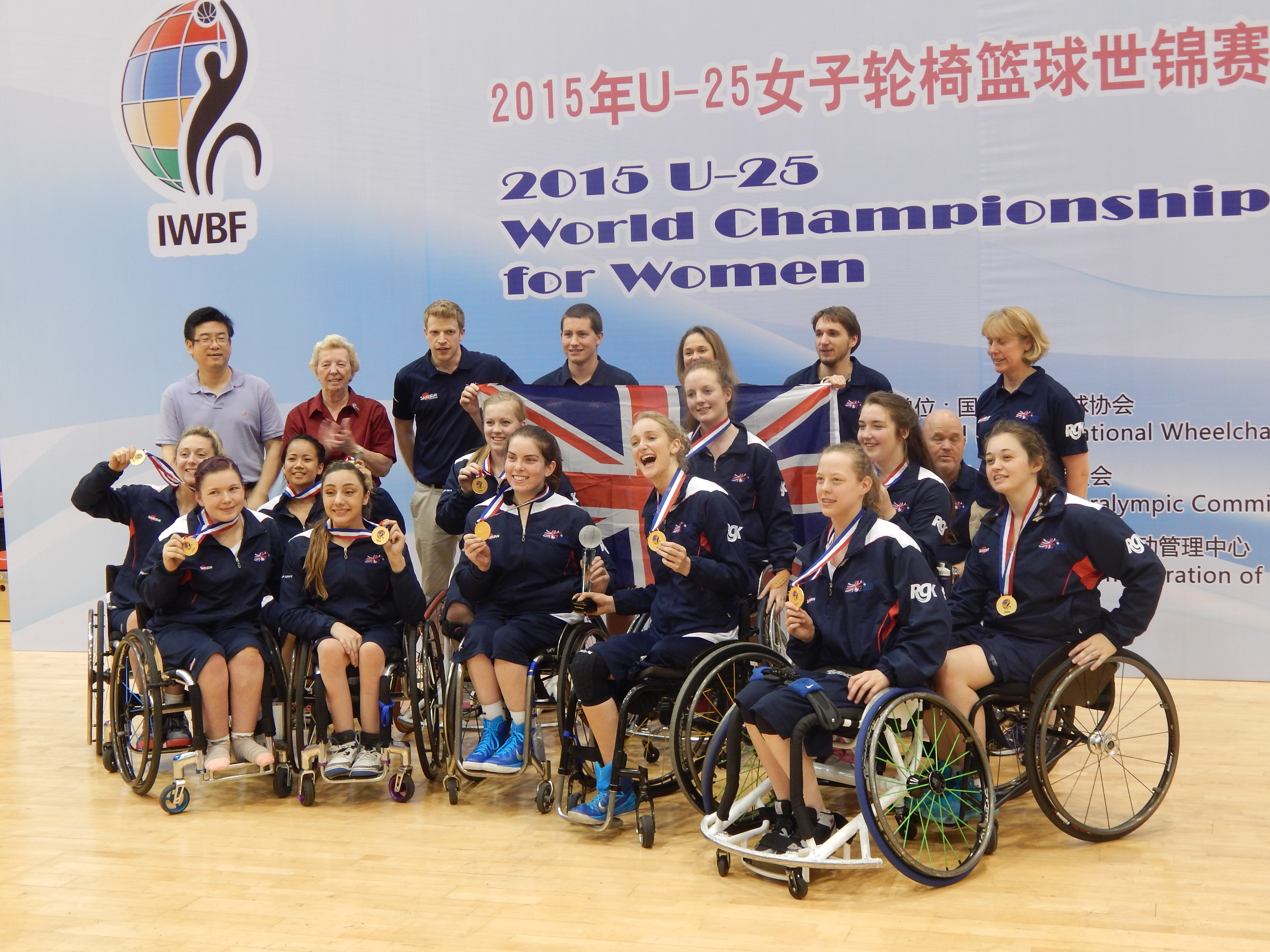
- Team Great Britain are Gold medallists
- Venue: China Disability Sports Training Centre
- Location: Beijing, China
- Start date: 30 June 2015
- End date: 6 July 2015
- Competitors: 6 teams from 6 nations

The 2015 Women's U25 Wheelchair Basketball World Championship was held at the China Disability Sports Training Centre in Beijing from 30 June to 6 July 2015. Six nations competed: Australia, Canada, China, Germany, Great Britain and Japan. Great Britain won the gold medal, defeating Australia in the final, while the host nation China secured the bronze medal.

The event took the form of a Round-robin tournament, with each team playing all the other teams once. The top four teams then went into semi-finals, while the bottom two played each other for world ranking. The winners of the semi-finals faced each other in the final, while the losers played for bronze. The championship was won by Team Great Britain. Australia came second and China third.

== Competition ==
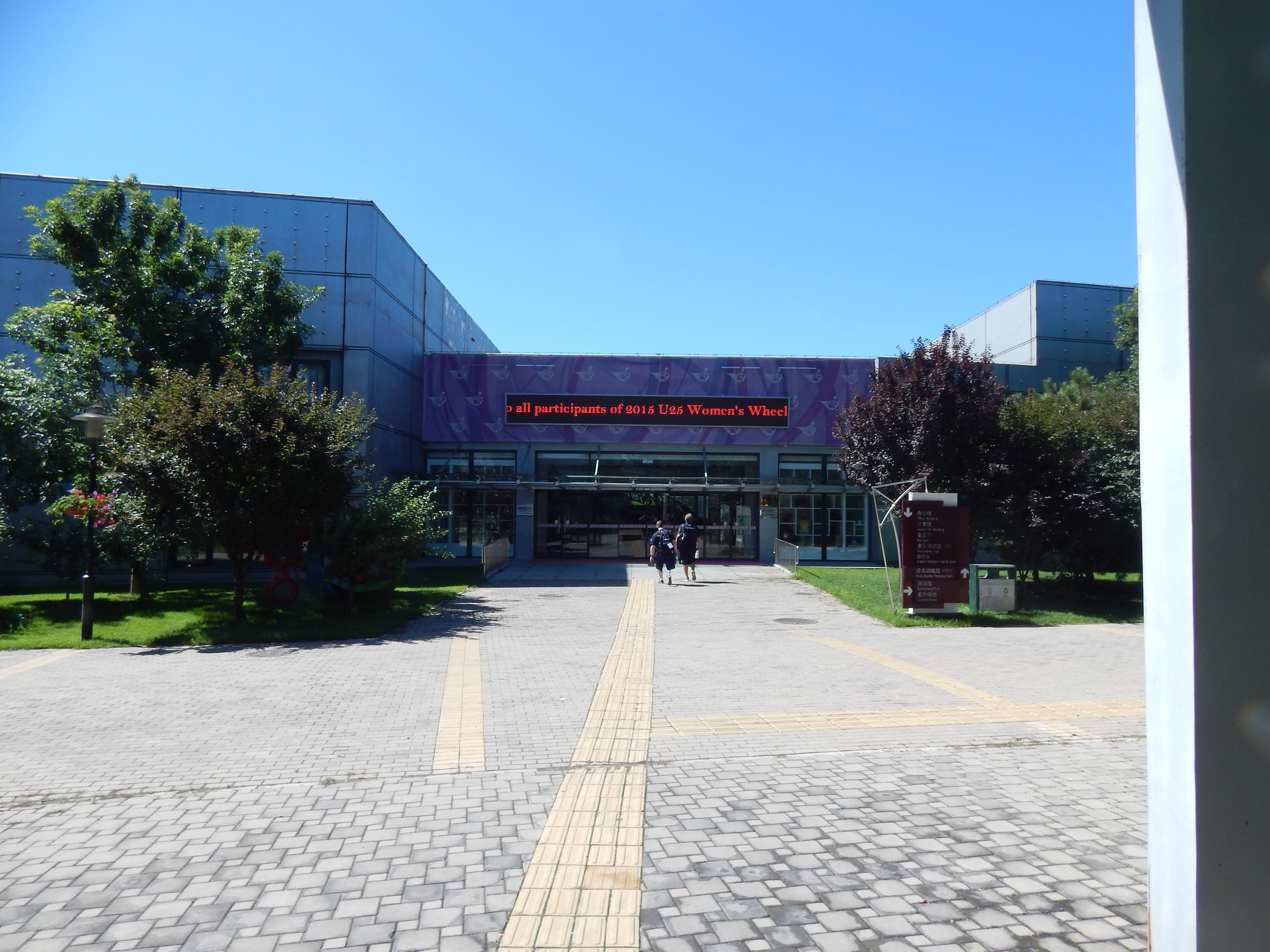
Venue - the Multi-Sport Building at the China Administration of Sports for Persons with Disabilities

This was the second time the Women's U25 Wheelchair Basketball World Championship was held. The first time was the 2011 Women's U25 Wheelchair Basketball World Championship in St. Catharines, Canada, in 2011. The Championship was hosted by the China Administration of Sports for Persons with Disabilities (CASPD) and the National Paralympic Committee of China.

Australia's Don Perriman was designated the Chief Classifier. Other classifiers were Canada's Anne Lachance, Germany's Sabine Drisch and Lithuania's Vaidas Stravinskas. Japan's Taichi Nishimura and the Netherlands' Nathalie Van Meurs were the Game Commissioners. Referee supervisors were Australia's Matthew Wells and Spain's Tonia Gomez. Referees were Helen Rosenberg from Australia, Robert Ruisinger from Germany, Jun Zhang from China, Hrvoje Pencinger from Croatia, Linas Radykas from Lithuania, Shu Fei Hsieh from Chinese Taipei and Celine Villard from France.

== Venue ==
The competition was held at the China Disability Sports Training Centre in Beijing. This is a purpose-built centre for disability sports. Opened on 28 June 2007, it was the first facility in China entirely devoted to disability sports training, and is the largest of its kind in the world. The Chinese Paralympic team used it as its training and preparation centre for the 2008 Summer Paralympics in Beijing. The entire complex is wheelchair accessible, with large elevators and wide halls.

== Teams ==
Six nations competed: Australia, Canada, China, Germany, Great Britain and Japan. Australia had won silver and Great Britain bronze in St. Catharines. This was the first time that the host country was competing.

=== Australia ===
Head Coach: David Gould
Assistant Coach: Tom Kyle
Technical Assistant: Michael Oxley
Development Coach: Ben Hodgens
Team Manager: Trudy Viney
Physiotherapist: Natasha Melacrinis
Program Manager: Leigh Gooding

#	Name	Class.
4	Sarah Vinci	1.0
5	Ella Sabljak	1.0
6	Catherine Nelson	4.0
7	Natalie Alexander	2.5
8	Georgia Bishop-Cash	4.0
9	Georgia Munro-Cook	4.5
10	Georgia Inglis	2.5
13	Hannah Dodd	2.0
12	Jess Cronje	4.0
15	Amber Merritt	4.5

=== Canada ===
Head coach: Ross Norton
Assistant coach: Simon Cash
Manager: Andrea Muir
Physio: Teresa Budwal

#	Name	Class.
4	Corin Metzger	2.5
5	Elodie Tessier	2.5
6	Helaina Cyr	2.5
7	Danielle Arbour	2.5
8	Alarissa Haak	2.0
9	Maude Jacques	2.5
10	Zoe Hahn	3.0
12	Sara Black	1.0
13	Arinn Young	4.5
14	Erica Gavel	4.5
15	Rosalie Lalonde	3.0

=== Germany ===
Head coach: Nora Schratz
Team manager: Yvone Daniel-Schratz
Doctor: Petra Michel-Leuteueser
Physiotherapist: Franziska Vogel
Technics: Thomas Grumpert

#	Name	Class.
4	Lias Nothelter	1.0
5	Laura Fürst	2.0
6	Barbara Groß	4.5
7	Linda Dahle	4.5
8	Lisa Fisher	3.0
9	Helene Harwich	1.0
10	Audrea Seyrl	2.0
11	Miriam Palm	2.0
12	Annabel Breuer	1.5
13	Fabienne Onishke	3.0
14	Selina Rausch	1.0
15	Rebecca Lieb	3.5

=== Great Britain ===
Team manager: Lauren Smith
Head coach: Thompson Miles
Assistant coach: Matthew Foden
Physiotherapist: Alison Nagata
Mechanic: Jonathan Morri
Performance Director: Paul Davies
Performance Analyst: Ian Britton

#	Name	Class.
4	Charlotte Moore	1.0
5	Sophie Carrigill	1.0
6	Siobhan Fitzpatrick	3.0
7	Frances Ray	2.5
8	Laurie Williams	2.5
9	Katie Morrow	4.5
10	Amy Conroy	4.0
12	Leah Evans	2.5
13	Jordanna Bartlett	3.0
14	Joy Haizelden	2.5
15	Megan Wood	3.0

=== China ===
Head coach: Yuan Sheng Xu
Assistant coach: Yan Han
Manager:Qi Chen
Physio: Yi Chuan Zhang

#	Name	Class.
4	Meng Yang	4.0
5	San Yang	4.0
6	Xue Mai Zhang	4.0
7	Xue Jing Chen	1.0
8	Man Liu	1.0
9	Tian Jiao Lei	4.5
10	Jia Meng Dai	4.5
11	Yan Yang	4.0
12	Si Ting Huang	2.0
13	Gui Di Lü	4.0
14	Peng Huan Xue	2.0
15	Yan Nan Shi	4.0

=== Japan ===
Tean Leader: Osamu Kotaki
Head coach: Kyoko Tsukamoto
Assistant coach: Akiko Nagahama
Team Staff: Eriko Yokose
Physiotherapist: Kayoko Hashimoto

#	Name	Class.
4	Hiroko Bamba	3.0
6	Izumi Zaima	1.0
7	Emi Yasuo	2.5
8	Amane Yanagimoto	2.5
10	Mayo Hagino	1.0
11	Ayano Ogurli	1.0
12	Nazuna Yamasaki	4.5
13	Sena Takase	2.5
14	Yui Kitama	1.0
15	Nina Okugawa	1.0

Source: Team Entry List, U25 World Championship for Women. Beijing: International Wheelchair Basketball Federation. 2015.

== Preliminary round ==
The event took the form of a Round-robin tournament, with each team playing all the other teams once. The top four teams then went into semi-finals, while the bottom two played each other for ranking. The winners of the semi-finals faced each other in the final, while the losers played for bronze.

=== Day 1 ===
There were three matches each day. The first was between the Australian team, known as the Devils, (Note: In line with Australian practice, the players named their team after a native Australian animal, in this case the Tasmanian devil. However, none of the players on the 2015 roster is from Tasmania.) and Japan. The Japanese team found themselves outclassed, with Australia outscoring them in the first quarter by 26–6. Australia's Amber Merritt was particularly dangerous, finishing the day with 22 points from 16 field goal attempts. Australia continued in the same vein in the second quarter, outscoring Japan 14–7. The second half proved more even, but only because Australian coach David Gould benched his top players; the final siren saw Australia winning 50–26.

The second game, between Great Britain and Canada, saw the former confirm its status as a contender for the gold medal, winning the first three quarters by 14–7, 15–4 and 15–4. The scoreline did not tell the whole story, however, for Canada's defensive pressure exacted a relatively low return for Great Britain's efforts, with only 24 field goals being scored from 60 attempts. Canada fared even more poorly though, with only 14 from 49 attempts. Britain's Jordanna Bartlett racked up 12 points, followed by Laurie Williams and Amy Conroy with 10 each. Canada's highest scorer was Arinn Young, with 11 points.

The final game of the day, held after the Opening Ceremony, saw host nation China facing Germany. The German team, spearheaded by Annabel Breuer and Laura Fürst, got off to a two-point lead at the first break, but the Chinese team outscored them in the two subsequent quarters by 18-4and 17–10. Tian Jiao Lei led China's scoring with 18 points, followed by Xue Jing Chen with 13. Laura Fürst contributed 14 points to Germany's scoreline, followed by Linda Dahle with 10. Despite a late rally by Germany, the Chinese team went away victors, 59–45.

=== Day 2 ===
The first game of the second day saw Australia and Great Britain, two of the previous day's winners face each other. Dominating the play were two tall players, both veterans of the 2012 Summer Paralympics in London: Australia's Amber Merritt, who racked up 28 points from 10 field goals and eight free throws, and Great Britain's Amy Conroy with 21 points from 10 fields goals and one of her five free throw attempts. After trailing for the first half, Australia outscored Great Britain in the third quarter 20–9 to lead by three points at three-quarter time. In the final quarter though, Great Britain stormed back to win by nine points.

The second game was between two of the first day's losing sides, Germany and Japan. A gallant Japanese side that never gave up provided Germany a contest, but Germany led at every break, and came away 50–28 winners. Barbara Groß racked up 22 points, followed by Linda Dahle with 11, while Japan's Mayo Hagino scored 18.

In the third game, Canada raced to a 22–14 lead against China at quarter time. The Canadian team was spearheaded by three team players from Quebec: Maude Jacques and Élodie Tessier, who went on to score 15 points; and Rosalie Lalonde, who was not far behind with 13. Arinn Young followed with 10 points. But China fought back in the second term, and the Canadians had no answer to Tian Jiao Lei, who scored 35 points. Maude was eventually fouled off, and China won 57–75.

=== Day 3 ===
The third day opened with the match between Canada and Japan. Canada proved too good, leading at every break and coasting to a 65–36 win, its first of the tournament. Arinn Young, Rosalie Lalonde and Erica Gavel were the top scorers for Canada with 18, 14 and 10 points respectively. Young's bag included a three-pointer and an impressive three from three attempts from the free throw line. Japan's top scorers were Maya Hagino with 15, followed by Yui Kitama with 11.

A far more equal contest was the second game of the day between Germany and Australia. Australia led by three points at quarter time, but Germany fought back in the second, outscoring Australia 14–10 to lead by a point at the long break. A see-sawing contest saw each side score ten points in the third quarter, leaving the margin unchanged at 30–31 at three-quarter time. But when the Australian Devils came back on the court after the break they scored eleven unanswered points. Germany was unable to catch up, and Australia notched up another win, the final score being 40–49. Australia's top scorer was one pointer Sarah Vinci with 13. Georgia Munro-Cook scored 12, and Georgia Inglis and Amber Merritt scored 10 points each. Germany's Barbara Groß scored 18 points and took 13 rebounds, while Linda Dahle scored 14 points and took 9 rebounds.

The third match of the day was between the two unbeaten teams, China and Great Britain. Britain's defensive pressure was intense, and its scoring was accurate. Great Britain led at each break, piling on 16 points to China's 10 in the first quarter, 14 to 10 in the second, and 28 to 11 in the third, running away to a 70–45 victory. Britain's Jordanna Bartlett scored 26 points and took 11 rebounds; Amy Conroy scored 18 points, including four from four attempts from the free throw line, and Laurie Williams notched up 16 points. China's top player was Jiameng Dai, who scored 24 points and took 13 rebounds. This left Great Britain as the only undefeated team in the competition.

=== Day 4 ===
The fourth day of competition opened with the match between Germany and Canada. Both sides needed a win keep their semifinal hopes alive. Germany moved to a four-point 14–10 lead at quarter time, but this was erased by five unanswered points to Canada immediately after the break. Germany fought back to lead by five points 26–10 at half time, only to be outscored by six in the third quarter to be a point down at three-quarter time. Canada was able to outscore a tiring Germany again in the final quarter to post a four-point win, their second of the completion. Leading the scoring for Canada was Arinn Young with 26 points and 12 rebounds. Germany's Linda Dahle had 23 points and 10 rebounds, while Barbara Groß scored 10 points and had 13 rebounds.

The second match of the day pitted undefeated Great Britain against Japan, a side yet to post a win. Japan gave Great Britain little trouble, and Great Britain took the opportunity to give young players some court time – one of the objectives of the tournament. Every player spent at least 14 minutes on the court, and all had at least one shot at goal, resulting in all but two getting on the scoreboard. Amy Conroy with 16 points, Jordanna Bartlett with 14 and Leah Evans with 12 points led the scoring, but 15-year-old Katie Morrow scored 8 points and took 7 rebounds, and Japan was left scoreless in the third quarter. Its leading scorer was Maya Hagino with 12 point. The final siren saw Great Britain win 67–22.

Australia and host nation China had both also lost to Great Britain. The third match of the day saw them face off against each other. Australia took an early 14–5 lead, but China pegged this back to 18–11 at quarter time. Halfway through the second term the scores were level, but Australia took a four-point lead into the half time break. Relentless pressure from China saw the lead evaporate, and Australia slipped to four points down at three-quarter time, and then to seven points down. What followed was a remarkable fightback, with Australia levelling the scores with less than three minutes to go. The final seconds of play saw Australia up by two points, 60–58, with Australia's Georgia Monro-Cook holding the ball and patiently awaiting the final siren.

=== Day 5 ===
The last day of round-robin competition opened with the match between Germany and Great Britain. Great Britain established an early ascendency, leading by 16–7 at quarter time, and 30–11 at half time. After this, both sides took the opportunity to give their newer players more court time. The final siren saw Great Britain post a 50–22 win, completing a clean sweep of the round-robin phase. Amy Conroy led the scoring again, with 23 points, and she also took six rebounds. Germany's lead scorer was Barbara Groß with 10 points.

The next match, between Canada and Australia, was a very different affair. A convincing win by Canada would send Australia into a semi-final against undefeated Great Britain. Australia started out strongly, posting an 18–10 lead at the first break, but Canada fought back in the second quarter, scoring 26 points to Australia's 13 for a five-point lead at half time. Problems with the scoreboard temporarily halted play. In the champions' quarter, the tide turned again, with Australia outscoring Canada 22–9 to establish an eight-point lead at three-quarter time, a lead that only inexorably increased in the final quarter. Canada had no answer to the Australian defensive press, nor to speed of Amber Merrit, who eventually scored 34 points. She was backed up by George Monro-Cook and Sarah Vinci with 14 each. In the last minutes Canada conceded defeat and replaced its lineup, and Australia followed suit, winning the game in the end 73–57 – Australia's highest score of the tournament. Canada's Arinn Young scored 20 points and took 14 rebounds.

The final round-robin match between China and Japan was a one-sided affair. China never looked threatened, and ran away to a 74–28 win. Tian Jiao Lei and Gui Di Lv scored 22 points each, closely followed by Jiameng Dai with 18. Japan's star player was Maya Hagino with 20 points, including a three-pointer, and nine rebounds.

=== Ladder ===
Team	Pld	W	L	Pts.
Great Britain	5	5	0	10
Australia	5	4	1	9
China	5	3	2	8
Canada	5	2	3	7
Germany	5	1	4	6
Japan	5	0	5	5

=== Scores ===
30 June 2015
14:00

Japan	26–50	Australia
Scoring by quarter: 6–26, 7–14, 6–6, 6–4
Pts: Hagino 9 Rebs: Yasuo 12; Asts: Hagino 5		Pts: Merritt 22; Rebs: Dodd 11; Asts: Inglis 5

China Disability Sports Training Centre, Beijing
Referees: Linas Radykas

30 June 2015
16:00

Great Britain	50–30	Canada
Scoring by quarter: 14–7, 15–4, 15–4, 6–15
Pts: Bartlett 12; Rebs: Conroy 8 Asts: Haizelden 5		Pts: Young 11; Rebs: Gavel 8 Asts: Young 2

China Disability Sports Training Centre, Beijing
Referees: Celine Villard

30 June 2015
19:30

China	59–45	Germany
Scoring by quarter: 15–17, 18–4, 17–10, 9–14
Pts: Lei 18; Rebs: Lv 9 Asts: Lei 3		Pts: Fürst 14; Rebs: Dahle 11; Asts: Fürst, Groß, Dahle 3

China Disability Sports Training Centre, Beijing
Referees: Rui Marques

1 July 2015
10:00

Australia	40–49	Great Britain
Scoring by quarter: 6–10, 6–10, 20–9, 8–20
Pts: Merritt 28; Rebs: Merritt 12; Asts: Inglis 5		Pts: Conroy 21; Rebs: Williams 10; Asts: Williams 2

China Disability Sports Training Centre, Beijing
Referees: Robert Rusinger

1 July 2015
13:30

Germany	50–28	Japan
Scoring by quarter: 14–7, 14–4, 6–7, 16–10
Pts: Groß 22; Rebs: Dahle 11; Asts: Dahle, Breuer 3		Pts: Hagino 18; Rebs: Hagino 10; Asts: Hagino 1

China Disability Sports Training Centre, Beijing
Referees: Hrvjoe Pencinger

1 July 2015
15:45

Canada	57–75	China
Scoring by quarter: 22–14, 9–22, 11–19, 15–20
Pts: Tessier, Jacques 15; Rebs: Tessier 7 Asts: Young 4		Pts: Lei 35; Rebs: Dai 16; Asts: Dai 4

China Disability Sports Training Centre, Beijing
Referees: Helen Rosenberg

2 July 2015
10:00

Japan	36–65	Canada
Scoring by quarter: 7–17, 10–19, 3–19, 16–10
Pts: Hagino 15; Rebs: Hagino 8 Asts: Hagino 1		Pts: Young 18; Rebs: Gavel 8 Asts: Metzer, Jacques 4

China Disability Sports Training Centre, Beijing
Referees: Linas Radykas

2 July 2015
13:30

Germany	40–49	Australia
Scoring by quarter: 8–11, 14–10, 10–10, 8–18
Pts: Groß 18; Rebs: Groß 13; Asts: Fürst 4		Pts: Vinci 13; Rebs: Inglis 9 Asts: Inglis 3

China Disability Sports Training Centre, Beijing
Referees: Milutin Jelenic

2 July 2015
15:45

China	45–70	Great Britain
Scoring by quarter: 10–16, 10–14, 11–28, 14–12
Pts: Dai 24; Rebs: Dai 13; Asts: Huang 4		Pts: Bartlett 26; Rebs: Bartlett 11; Asts: Haizelden 4

China Disability Sports Training Centre, Beijing
Referees: Fei Shu Hsieh

3 July 2015
10:00

Canada	51–47	Germany
Scoring by quarter: 10–14, 11–12, 16–10, 14–11
Pts: Young 26; Rebs: Young 12; Asts: Young 5		Pts: Dahle 23; Rebs: Groß 13; Asts: Fürst 4

China Disability Sports Training Centre, Beijing
Referees: Hrvjoe Pencinger

3 July 2015
13:30

Great Britain	67–22	Japan
Scoring by quarter: 10–10, 18–2, 18–0, 15–10
Pts: Conroy 16; Rebs: Morrow, Conroy 7 Asts: Fitzpatrick, Williams, Bartlett, Haizelden 2		Pts: Hagino 12; Rebs: Yanigimoto, Hagino, Yamasaki 6 Asts: Hagino 3

China Disability Sports Training Centre, Beijing
Referees: Celine Villard

3 July 2015
15:45

Australia	60–58	China
Scoring by quarter: 18–11, 15–18, 7–15, 20–14
Pts: Merritt 28; Rebs: Merritt 15; Asts: Merritt 5		Pts: Dai 28; Rebs: Dai 9 Asts: Dai 6

China Disability Sports Training Centre, Beijing
Referees: Linas Radykas

4 July 2015
10:00

Germany	22–50	Great Britain
Scoring by quarter: 7–16, 4–14, 8–8, 3–12
Pts: Barbara Groß 10; Rebs: Barbara Groß 9 Asts: Fürst 2		Pts: Conroy 23; Rebs: Bartlett 9 Asts: Williams, Bartlett, Haizelden 4

China Disability Sports Training Centre, Beijing
Referees: Linas Radykas

4 July 2015
13:30

Canada	57–73	Australia
Scoring by quarter: 10–18, 26–13, 9–22, 12–20
Pts: Merritt 28; Rebs: Vinci 10; Asts: Inglis 7		Pts: Young 20; Rebs: Young 14; Asts: Haak, Jacques, Young 3

China Disability Sports Training Centre, Beijing
Referees: Rui Marques

4 July 2015
15:45

China	74–28	Japan
Scoring by quarter: 11–9, 23–6, 22–2, 18–11
Pts: Lei, Lv 22; Rebs: Chen, Dai 7 Asts: Dai 5		Pts: Hagino 20; Rebs: Hagino 9 Asts: Yanagimoto, Kitama 1

China Disability Sports Training Centre, Beijing
Referees: Helen Rosenberg

== Finals ==
Semi-finals
5 July – 13:30
Great Britain	67
Canada	51
5 July – 15:45
Australia	46
China	38

Final
6 July – 15:45
Great Britain	44
Australia	35
Third place
6 July – 13:30
China	61
Canada	53

=== Fifth place game ===
The finals round began with the game for fifth place between Germany and Japan. With little at stake, Germany gave everyone a run; none of the German players spent more than 30 minutes on the court. A disappointed Germany won 46–38. Once again, Barbara Groß was lead scorer, with 18 points, and ten rebounds. Hagino was again Japan's top scorer with 17 points.

5 July 2015
10:00

Germany	46–38	Japan
Scoring by quarter: 15–10, 15–9, 8–6, 8–13
Pts: Groß 18; Rebs: Groß 10; Asts: Breuer, Onischke 2		Pts: Hagino 17; Rebs: Yamasaki 10; Asts: Bamba, Yasuo, Hagino 1

China Disability Sports Training Centre, Beijing
Referees: Rui Marques

=== Semi-finals ===
Semi-finals were held that afternoon. The first was between Great Britain and Canada, who had faced each other in the opening game. Canada got off to a quick start, but Great Britain was able to secure an 11–8 lead at quarter time. This was quickly erased after the break with a three pointer by Arinn Young. Great Britain then scored ten unanswered points, and wound up with a 34–21 lead at half time. Canada brought on Alarissa Haak, adding another tall player in addition to Arinn Young. They managed top peg back Great Britain's lead, but only to 47–36 at three-quarter time. Great Britain came home strongly in the final quarter, winning 67–51. Arinn Young was again Canada's top scorer with 25 points (and 13 rebounds), followed by Maude Jacques with 18 points. Great Britain's Laurie Williams and Jordanna Bartlett racked up 19 points each, followed by Amy Conroy with 17.

The second semi-final between the Australian Devils and the host nation was the first to attract a sizeable crowd. The crowd was pleased when China bolted to an early lead of six points at half time, but Australia fought back to a one-point deficit at half time. Relentless defensive pressure coupled with fast movement allowed Australia to secure a five-point lead at three-quarter time, and the Devils went on to win by eight points, 46–38. Notably, both sides played almost the entire game with their starting lineups: Sarah Vinci, Ella Sabljak, Georgia Inglis, Georgia Monro-Cook and Amber Merritt for Australia; and Xue Jing Chen, Man Liu, Tian Jiao Lei, Jia Meng Dai and Si Ting Huang for China. Jess Cronje briefly replaced Georgia Munro-Cook, and Gui Di Lv replaced Tian Jiao Lei for the last 15 minutes. Top scorers Amber Merritt for Australia, and Jia Meng Dai for China, both of whom scored 23 points.

5 July 2015
13:30

Great Britain	67–51	Canada
Scoring by quarter: 13–10, 21–11, 13–15, 20–15
Pts: Williams, Bartlett 19; Rebs: Williams 11; Asts: Conroy, Bartlett 4		Pts: Young 25; Rebs: Young 13; Asts: Haak 3

China Disability Sports Training Centre, Beijing
Referees: Helen Rosenberg

5 July 2015
15:45

Australia	46–38	China
Scoring by quarter: 7–13, 13–8, 16–10, 10–7
Pts: Merritt 23; Rebs: Monro-Cook 13; Asts: Inglis, Merritt 2		Pts: Dai 23; Rebs: Dai 13; Asts: Huang 4

China Disability Sports Training Centre, Beijing
Referees: Linas Radykas

=== Bronze medal match ===
The bronze medal match pitted the host nation against Canada. China took an early lead but was unable to capitalise on it against a gallant Canadian team, and the first quarter ended with China holding only a narrow four-point lead. Efforts by China to increase their lead and by Canada to narrow it came to naught in the second quarter, which ended with both sides scoring 14 points. A three-pointer at the start of the third quarter from Arinn Young saw the margin narrowed to just one point, but China held on, and eventually increased its lead to six points. Canada was unable to close the gap, and the final siren saw China win by eight points. Arinn Young scored 24 points, including two three-pointers, followed by Maude Jacques with 13. China's lead scorer was Tian Jiao Lei with 24 points, while Jia Meng Dai had 19.

6 July 2015
13:30

China	61–53	Canada
Scoring by quarter: 14–10, 14–14, 15–13, 18–16
Pts: Lei 24; Rebs: Dai 12; Asts: Dai 5		Pts: Young 24; Rebs: Young 10; Asts: Haak, Young 2

China Disability Sports Training Centre, Beijing
Referees: Helen Rosenberg

=== Gold medal match ===
The gold medal match between Australia and Great Britain was a hard-fought affair. Relentless defensive pressure by both sides led to shot clock violations and missed shots at goal, resulting in a score of just 6–6 at quarter time. Australia kept Britain scoreless for much of the second quarter, and moved to a narrow 11–15 lead at half time. The lead was erased in the third quarter, which ended with Britain holding a one-point lead. The final quarter began with Britain scoring ten unanswered points, a deficit that Australia was unable to overcome, and Britain won 44–35. Once again, Britain's lead scorers were Amy Conroy with 19 and Jordanna Bartlett with 13. Australia's Amber Merritt racked up 21 points.

6 July 2015
15:45

Great Britain	44–35	Australia
Scoring by quarter: 6–6, 5–9, 15–10, 18–10
Pts: Conroy 19; Rebs: Conroy 13; Asts: Haizelden 3		Pts: Merritt 21; Rebs: Merritt 12; Asts: Munro-Cook 2

China Disability Sports Training Centre, Beijing
Referees: Linas Radykas

== MVP and All Stars ==
MVP and All Stars for the competition were announced at a banquet on the evening after the final:

=== All Star Five ===
- Amber Merritt (Australia) (4.5)
- Jordanna Bartlett (Great Britain) (3.0)
- Laurie Williams (Great Britain) (2.5)
- Mayo Hagino (Japan) (1.0)
- Maude Jacques (Canada) (2.5)

=== Most Valuable Player ===
- Amy Conroy (4.0) (Great Britain)
