= Barbara Gross =

German wheelchair basketball player

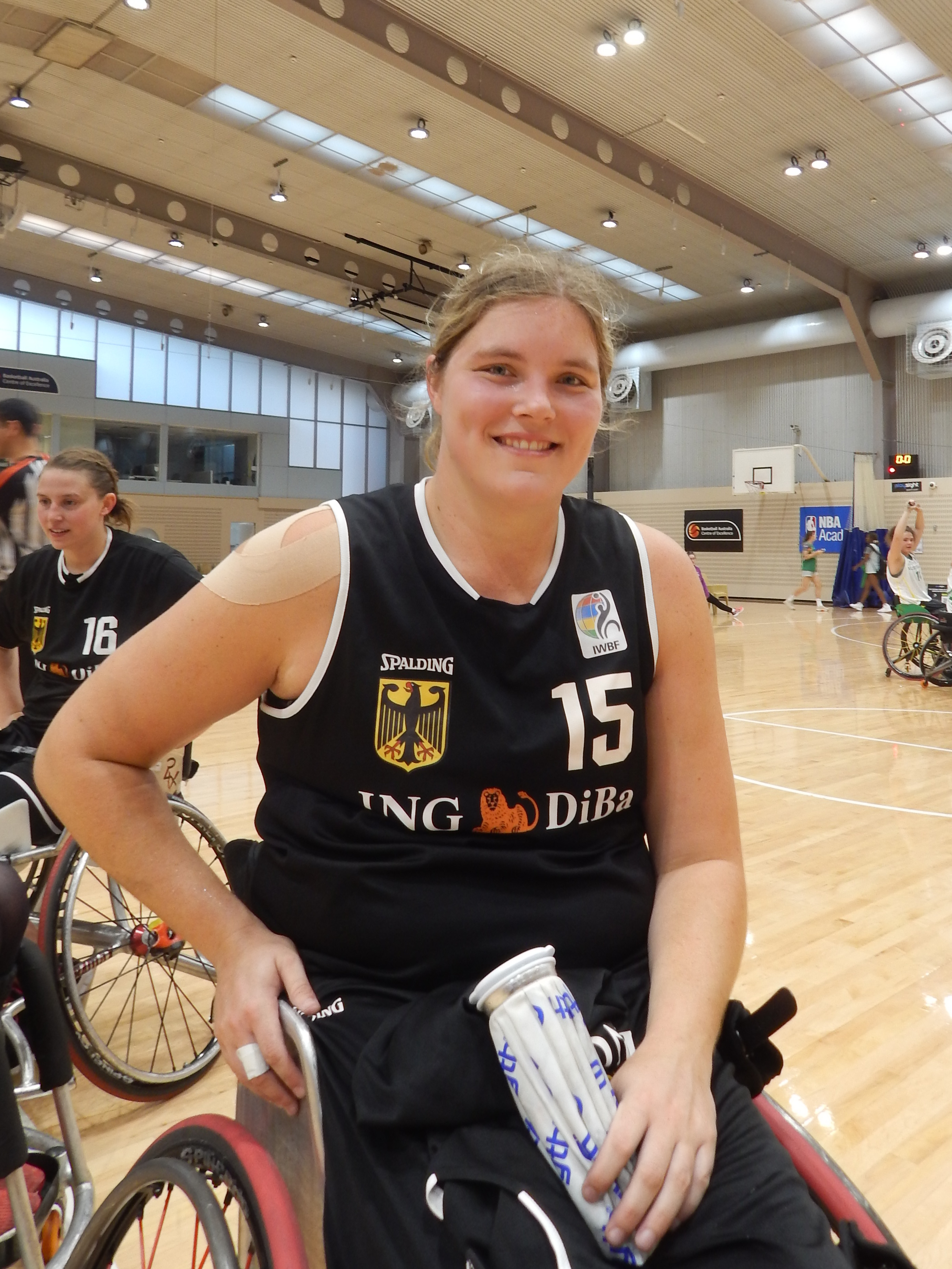
- Barbara Gross at the Australian Institute of Sport in Canberra, Australia, in 2018

Personal information
- Nationality: Germany
- Born: 20 November 1993 (age 32)

Sport
- Country: Germany
- Sport: Wheelchair basketball
- Disability class: 4.5
- Event: Wheelchair Basketball
- College team: University of Alabama
- Team: Rhine River Rhinos Wiesbaden

Achievements and titles
- Paralympic finals: 2016 Paralympics 2020 Paralympics
Medal record
Women's wheelchair basketball
Representing Germany
Paralympic Games
Silver medal – second place	2016 Rio de Janeiro	Team competition
IWBF World Championship
Bronze medal – third place	2018 Hamburg, Germany	Team competition

Barbara Gross (German: Barbara Groß, born 20 November 1993) is a 4.5 point wheelchair basketball player, who played for the German national team at the 2016 Summer Paralympics in Rio de Janeiro, winning silver. President Joachim Gauck awarded the team Germany's highest sporting honour, the Silbernes Lorbeerblatt (Silver Laurel Leaf).

== Biography ==
Barbara Gross was born in Gießen on 20 November 1993. She is classified as a 4.5 point wheelchair basketball player. She played for the Under 25 national team at the 2015 Women's U25 Wheelchair Basketball World Championship in Beijing in 2015, and then the senior team at the European championships (Worcester).

In 2016, 2017 and 2018, she played for the University of Alabama in the United States. Her 2018 team includes fellow German national players Katharina Lang and Selena Rausch, and Canadian national players Arinn Young and Rosalie Lalonde. The Alabama team won its fifth national collegiate championship in March 2017, with a 57–48 win over the University of Texas at Arlington (UTA) in a match in which Gross scored 20 points with two assists. In 2018, Alabama came second, losing to UTA 65–55 in the final.

Gross made her Paralympic debut at the 2016 Summer Paralympics in Rio de Janeiro, where the German team won silver. President Joachim Gauck awarded the team Germany's highest sporting honour, the Silbernes Lorbeerblatt (Silver Laurel Leaf) in 2016. In 2018, she was part of the team that won bronze at the 2018 Wheelchair Basketball World Championship in Hamburg.

In July 2020 she was one of nine paralympic athletes forced into retirement after the International Wheelchair Basketball Federation was forced to align its eligibility criteria with that of the International Paralympic Committee.

Gross appealed the decision of eligibility and won the right to compete in further competitions. Gross was selected for the Paralympic Games in Tokyo as a member of the German Women's Team where the team finished fourth.

== Achievements ==
- 2015: Gold at European championships (Worcester, England)
- 2016: Silver at the Paralympic Games (Rio de Janeiro, Brazil)
- 2017: Silver European Championships (Tenerife, Spain)
- 2018: Bronze at the World Championships (Hamburg, Germany)
- 2019: Bronze at European Championships (Rotterdam, Netherlands)
- 2021: 4th at Paralympics (Tokyo, Japan)
