= Élodie Tessier =

Canadian wheelchair basketball player

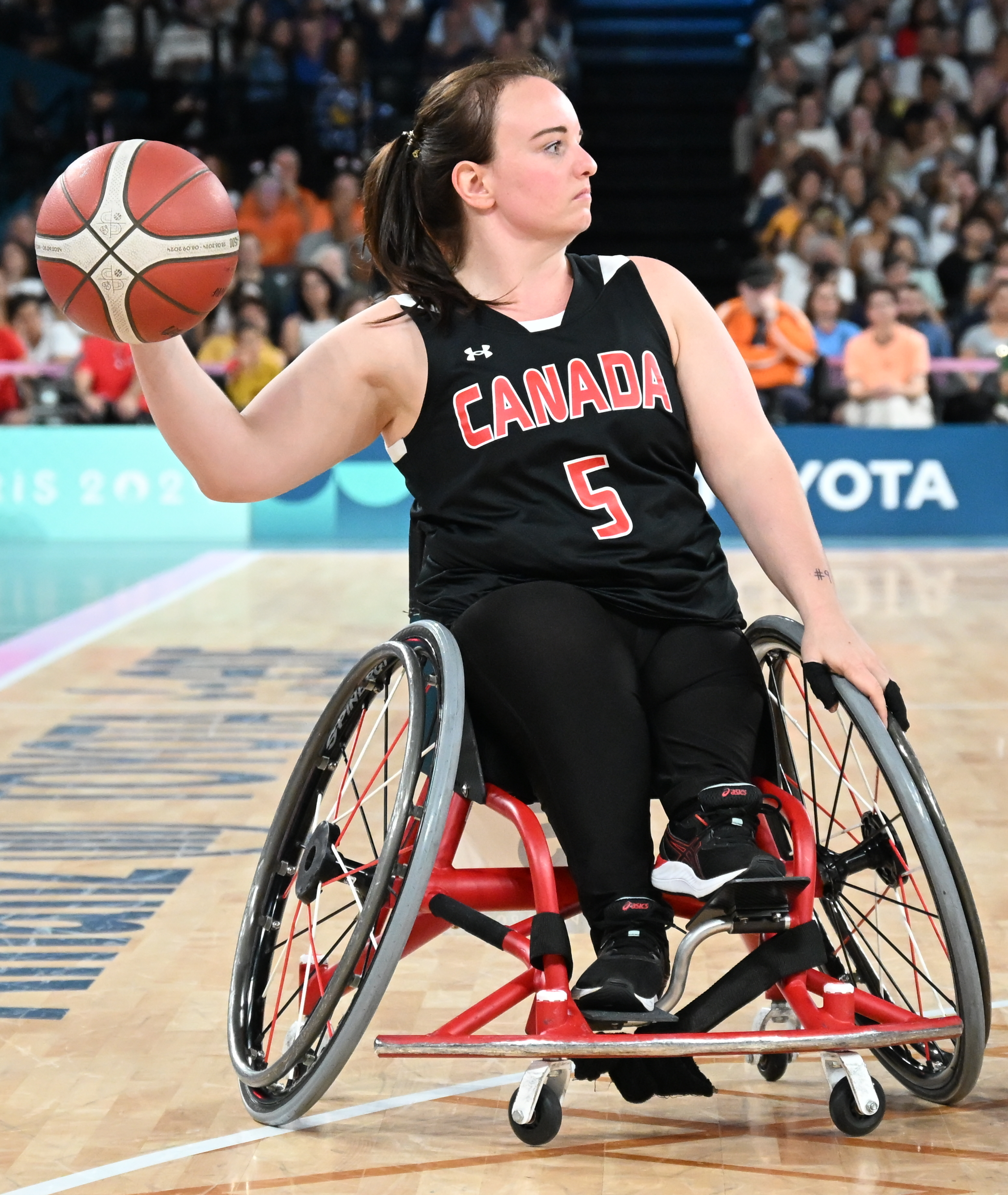
- Tessier at the 2024 Summer Paralympics

Personal information
- Born: March 14, 1996 (age 30) Montreal, Quebec, Canada
- Height: 3 ft 11 in (1.19 m)

Sport
- Country: Canada
- Sport: Wheelchair basketball
- Disability class: 2.5
- Event: Women's team
Medal record
Women's wheelchair basketball
Representing Canada
World Championship
Silver medal – second place	2026 Ottawa	Team
Commonwealth Games
Gold medal – first place	2022 Birmingham	3x3
Parapan American Games
Gold medal – first place	2019 Lima	Team
Silver medal – second place	2023 Santiago	Team

Élodie Tessier (born March 14, 1996) is a Canadian 2.5 point wheelchair basketball player. She was part of the Under 25 national team at the 2015 Women's U25 Wheelchair Basketball World Championship in Beijing, and the senior Canadian national women's team at the Americas Cup in Cali, Colombia, in 2017, and the Wheelchair Basketball World Championship in Hamburg in 2018.

== Biography ==
Tessier was born in Montreal, Quebec, on March 14, 1996. Her legs did not grow normally; she is only 3 feet 11 inches (1.19 m) tall and uses a wheelchair. As a child, she was soon physically overtaken by her twin sister; but in high school, another girl in a wheelchair introduced her to wheelchair basketball. Élodie soon became the sportier of the two sisters.

Classified as a 2.5 point player, Tessier was part of the Canadian junior team at the 2013 Youth Parapan American Games in Buenos Aires (where she also represented Canada in the Under 21 3-on-3 competition) and then the 2015 Women's U25 Wheelchair Basketball World Championship in Beijing. In 2017, she won the Canadian Wheelchair Basketball League (CWBL) Women's National Championship in Montreal, Quebec, with the Gladiateurs de Laval. In the same year she was part of the senior national team at the Americas Cup in Cali, Colombia, where Team Canada was placed first. In April 2018, she was part of Team Quebec at the CWBL Women's National Championship in Richmond, British Columbia. Team Quebec came second, and she was named as an All-Star. In August 2018, she was part of Team Canada at the 2018 Wheelchair Basketball World Championship in Hamburg.
