= Georgia Inglis =

Australian wheelchair basketball player

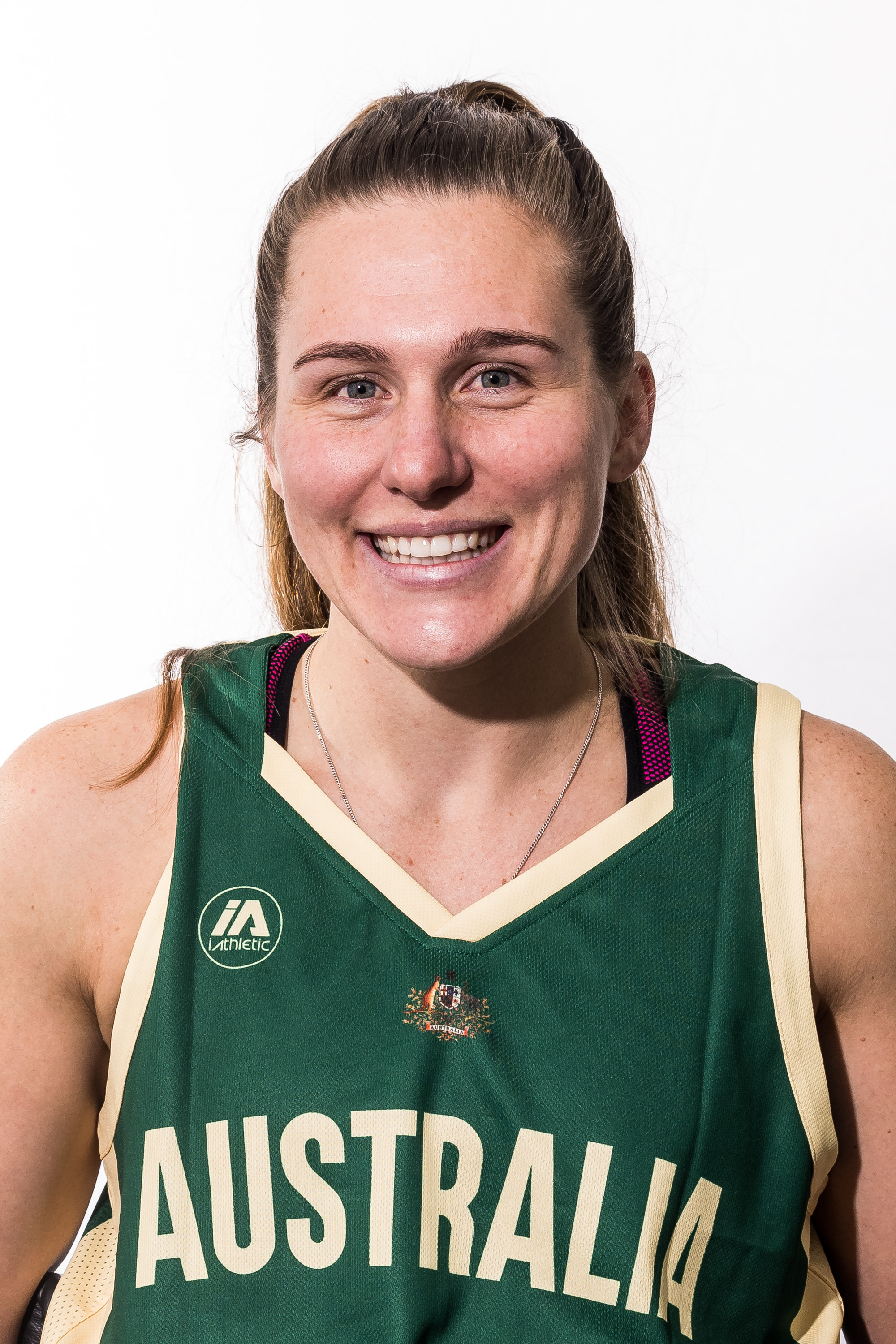
- Georgia Inglis in 2023

Personal information
- Nationality: Australia
- Born: 28 March 1994 (age 32) Perth, Australia
- Height: 5.9

Sport
- College team: University of Alabama
- Club: Perth Wheelcats
Medal record
U25 Women's World Championships
Silver medal – second place	2011 St Catharines	Women's wheelchair basketball
Silver medal – second place	2015 Beijing	Women's wheelchair basketball
Commonwealth Games
Silver medal – second place	2022 Birmingham	3x3 Competition

Georgia Inglis (born 28 March 1994) is a 2.5 point Australian wheelchair basketball player. She was part of the Australia women's national wheelchair basketball team at the Osaka Cup in Japan in February 2013, and at the Asia-Oceania Zone Qualifiers in Bangkok in November 2013. She played with the Perth Western Stars team that won the Women's National Wheelchair basketball League (WNWBL) championship title in 2013.

== Personal ==
Georgia Inglis was born on 28 March 1994. In 2004, she was run over by a ride-on lawn mower, resulting in a broken back. She graduated from Curtin University in 2017 with a Bachelor in health science. She is currently enrolled at the University of Alabama completing her master's degree in Women's Studies. Her sister Maddison Inglis is a professional tennis player.

== Wheelchair basketball ==
=== Club ===
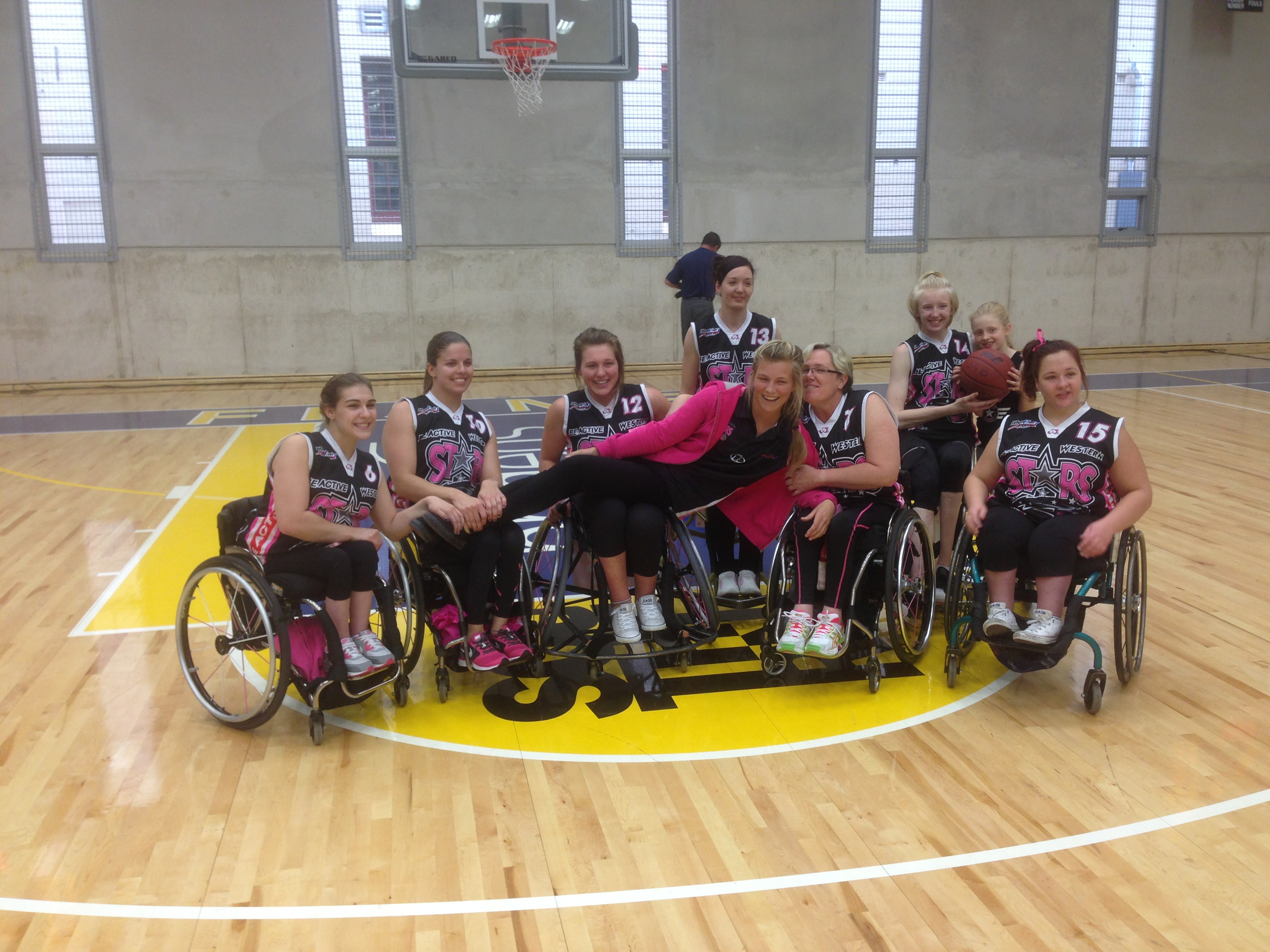
Western Stars women's wheelchair basketball team. Players are, left to right: Sarah Vinci, Clare Nott, Georgia Inglis, Amanda Nott, Mandy Bonavita, Amber Merritt, Natalie Alexander

Inglis made her debut with the Perth Western Stars in 2010. In 2013, she was part of the side that won the Women's National Wheelchair Basketball League (WNWBL) championship title. The Stars fought their way back from nine points down at three quarter time to win 43–40, in part due her efforts. "Georgia Inglis", wrote one commentator, "was outstanding in the clutch hitting some BIG baskets which including a one handed buzzer beater that tied the scores up."

Inglis played with the Red Dust Lady Heelers in its debut season in 2017, averaging nine points, five rebounds and 4.9 assists per game. She returned to the Western Stars (now the Perth Wheelcats) in 2018.

=== College ===
In April 2018, the University of Alabama announced that it had signed Inglis to play with the Alabama Crimson Tide. In her first year at Alabama, Inglis won her first Collegiate National Championship after defeating the University of Texas at Arlington.

=== National ===
Inglis made her international debut playing for the Under 25 team (the Devils) in the Under 25 Women's Wheelchair Basketball World Championships in Canada in 2011, winning a silver medal. She made her debut with the senior team, known as the Gliders, at the Osaka Cup in Japan in February 2013, where the Gliders successfully defended the trophy they had won in 2008, 2009, 2010 and 2012.

In October 2013, Inglis was selected to play at the International Wheelchair Basketball Federation (IWBF) Asia/Oceania Championships in Thailand. She was a member of the Devils team that won silver at the 2015 Women's U25 Wheelchair Basketball World Championship, and the Australian team that won the silver medal in the 3x3 Women's tournament at the 2022 Commonwealth Games. In June 2023, she was a member of the Gliders team at the 2022 Wheelchair Basketball World Championships in Dubai.

Season statistics
Competition	Season	Matches	FGM-FGA	FG%	3FGM-3FGA	3FG%	FTM-FTA	FT%	PF	Pts	TOT	AST	PTS
WNWBL	2013	18	49–161	30.4	0–6	0.0	1–4	25.0	16	99	5.2	1.4	5.2
WNWBL	2012	15	17–45	37.8	—	0.0	2–9	22.2	9	36	3.9	1.1	2.4
WNWBL	2011	19	6–24	25.0	—	0.0	0–6	0.0	12	12	0.4	0.0	4.6
WNWBL	2010	9	0–6	0.0	—	0.0	—	0.0	12	0	0.0	0.0	0.0

Key
FGM, FGA, FG%: field goals made, attempted and percentage	3FGM, 3FGA, 3FG%: three-point field goals made, attempted and percentage
FTM, FTA, FT%: free throws made, attempted and percentage	PF: personal fouls
Pts, PTS: points, average per game	TOT: turnovers average per game, AST: assists average per game
