= 3x3 basketball at the 2022 Commonwealth Games – Women's wheelchair tournament =

Women's 3x3 wheelchair basketball tournament at the 2022 Commonwealth Games
- Venue: Smithfield
- Dates: 29 July – 2 August 2022
- Competitors: 24 from 6 nations

Medalists
gold medal	Kady Dandeneau; Tara Llanes; Tamara Steeves; Elodie Tessier	Canada
silver medal	Hannah Dodd; Georgia Inglis; Amber Merritt; Ella Sabljak	Australia
bronze medal	Jade Atkin; Amy Conroy; Joy Haizelden; Charlotte Moore	England

The women's 3x3 wheelchair basketball tournament at the 2022 Commonwealth Games was held in a temporary Games-time venue at the brownfield site in Smithfield between 29 July and 2 August 2022.

The discipline of wheelchair basketball made its sport debut at the Commonwealth Games. Canada won the gold medal, defeating Australia in the final. England won the bronze medal.

== Qualification ==
England qualified as host nation, two nations qualified by winning their respective IWBF zonal qualifiers, and the rest received Bipartite Invitations.

Means of qualification	Date	Location	Quotas	Qualified
Host Nation	—N/a	—N/a	1	England
IWBF Africa Qualifier	9 October 2021	(South Africa) Johannesburg	1	South Africa
IWBF Europe Qualifier	14 April 2022	(Scotland) Largs	1	Scotland
Bipartite Invitation (Note: The women's IWBF Americas and Asia/Oceania Qualifiers were cancelled, so two additional invitations (one per Zone) were sent instead.)	22 April 2022	—N/a	3	Australia; Canada; Kenya
TOTAL			6	

Qualifier scheduling issue

== Rosters ==
CGA	Players			
Australia	Amber Merritt	Georgia Inglis	Hannah Dodd	Ella Sabljak
Canada	Tara Llanes	Tamara Steeves	Kady Dandeneau	Elodie Tessier
England	Jade Atkin	Amy Conroy	Joy Haizelden	Charlotte Moore
Kenya	Carolina Wanjira	Eunice Otieno	Rahel Alar	Stella Tiyoy
Scotland	Robyn Love	Judith Hamer	Jessica Whyte	Lynsey Speirs
South Africa	Aviwe Ngoni	Samkelisiwe Mbatha	Michelle Moganedi	Kelebogile Moeng

== Competition format ==
Six teams were drawn into two groups. Upon completion of the group stage, the top two teams in each group advance to the semi-finals; the remaining two teams contest a match for fifth / sixth place.

== Group stage ==
All times based on British Summer Time (UTC+01:00)

=== Group A ===
Pos	Team	Pld	W	L	PF	PA	PD	Qualification
1	Canada	2	2	0	30	9	+21	Semi-finals
2	England (H)	2	1	1	28	14	+14	Semi-finals
3	Kenya	2	0	2	2	37	−35	5th place match

Source: Birmingham 2022
Rules for classification: 1) Wins; 2) Head-to-head record; 3) Points scored.
(H) Hosts

29 July 2022
15:30

Report

Kenya	1–20	England
Pts: Wanjira 1		Pts: Moore, Atkin 6

Smithfield

30 July 2022
15:30

Report

Canada	17–1	Kenya
Pts: Dandeneau 7		Pts: Alar 1

Smithfield

31 July 2022
15:30

Report

England	8–13	Canada
Pts: Haizelden 5		Pts: Steeves 7

Smithfield

=== Group B ===
Pos	Team	Pld	W	L	PF	PA	PD	Qualification
1	Australia	2	2	0	33	8	+25	Semi-finals
2	Scotland	2	1	1	21	14	+7	Semi-finals
3	South Africa	2	0	2	5	37	−32	5th place match

Source: Birmingham 2022
Rules for classification: 1) Wins; 2) Head-to-head record; 3) Points scored.

29 July 2022
19:30

Report

Australia	12–5	Scotland
Pts: Merrit 5		Pts: Hamer 5

Smithfield

30 July 2022
19:30

Report

Scotland	16–2	South Africa
Pts: Hamer 10		Pts: Moeng 2

Smithfield

31 July 2022
19:30

Report

South Africa	3–21	Australia
Pts: Moeng 2		Pts: Merritt 11

Smithfield

== Knockout stage ==
Semi-finals
1 August
Canada	12
Scotland	5
1 August
Australia	8
England	6

Gold medal match
2 August
Canada	14
Australia	5
Bronze medal match
2 August
Scotland	10
England	12

=== Fifth place match ===
2 August 2022
15:00

Report

South Africa	6–5	Kenya
Pts: Moeng 5		Pts: Alar 4

Smithfield

=== Semi-finals ===
1 August 2022
15:00

Report

Canada	12–5	Scotland
Pts: Tessier, Dandeneau 5		Pts: Love 3

Smithfield

1 August 2022
15:00

Report

Australia	8–6	England
Pts: Merritt 4		Pts: Conroy 3

Smithfield

=== Bronze medal match ===
2 August 2022
15:00

Report

Scotland	10–12	England
Pts: Hamer 5		Pts: Conroy 4

Smithfield

=== Gold medal match ===
2 August 2022
19:30

Report

Canada	14–5	Australia
Pts: Dandeneau 6		Pts: Dodd 3

Smithfield

== Final ranking ==
Rank	Team
1st place, gold medalist(s)	Canada
2nd place, silver medalist(s)	Australia
3rd place, bronze medalist(s)	England
4	Scotland
5	South Africa
6	Kenya
