= Ella Sabljak =

Australian wheelchair basketball player

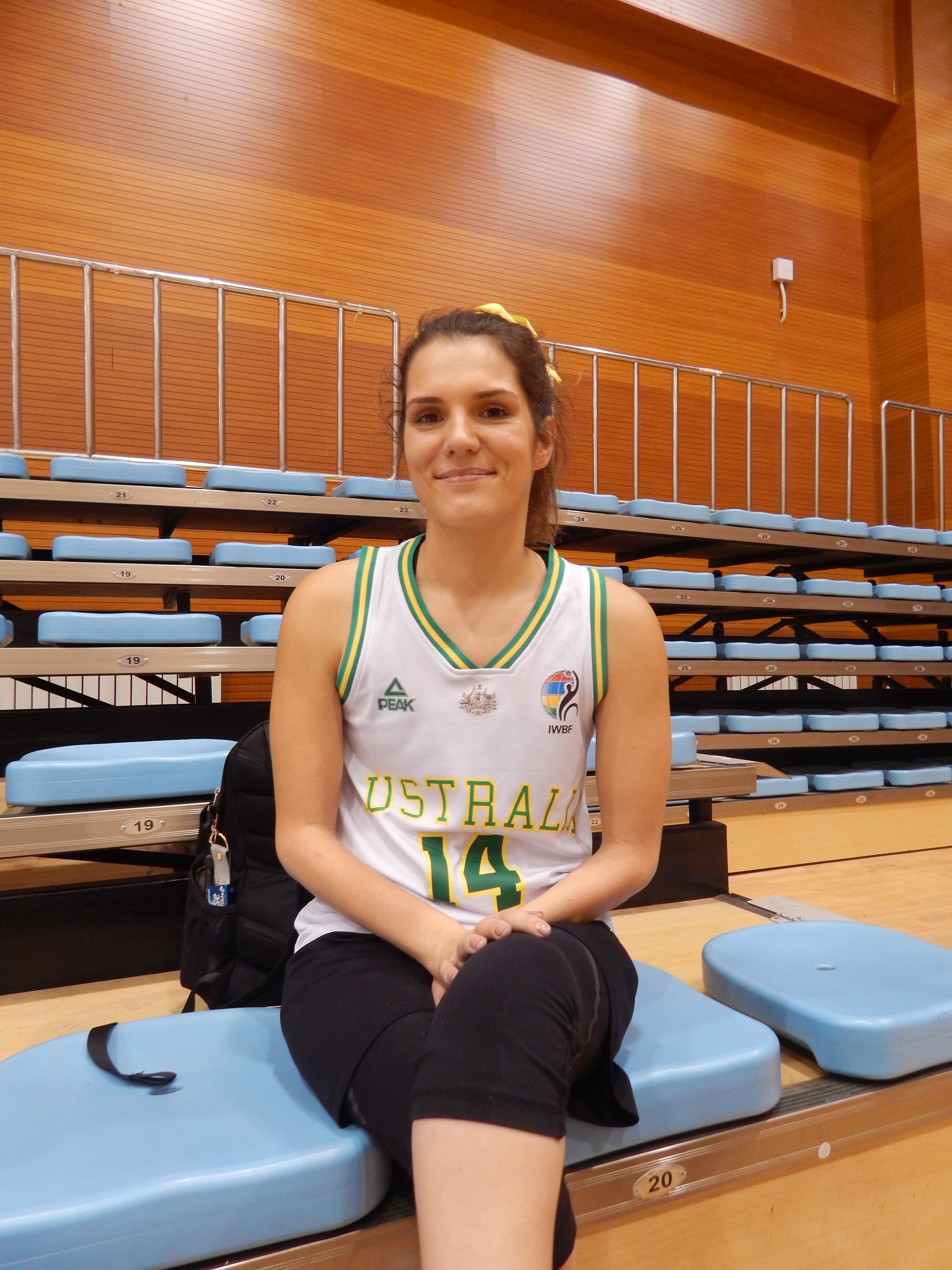
- Sabljak at the 2017 IWBF Asia-Oceania Championships in Beijing in October 2017

Personal information
- Full name: Ella Louise Sabljak
- Born: 17 October 1991 (age 34) Moonee Ponds, Victoria, Australia

Sport
- Country: Australia
- Sport: Wheelchair basketball
- Position: Guard
- Disability class: 1.0
- Event: Women's team
- Club: Queensland Comets (basketball); Bond University Rugby
Medal record
Wheelchair rugby
Paralympic Games
Bronze medal – third place	2024 Paris	Mixed team
World Championships
Gold medal – first place	2022 Vejle	Mixed team
Silver medal – second place	2026 São Paulo	Mixed team
Women's wheelchair basketball
U25 Women's World Championships
Silver medal – second place	2011 St Catharines	Team
Silver medal – second place	2015 Beijing	Team
Commonwealth Games
Silver medal – second place	2022 Birmingham	3x3 team

Ella Louise Sabljak (born 17 October 1991) is an Australian 1.0 point wheelchair basketball and 2.5 wheelchair rugby player. She represented Australia at the 2020 Tokyo Paralympics in basketball and at the 2024 Paris Paralympics, she won a bronze medal in wheelchair rugby with the Steelers.

== Biography ==
Sabljak has hereditary motor and sensory neuropathy (type 2) which means the loss of muscle tone below the knee as well as in her forearm. She studied education at Griffith University in Queensland, and is a qualified primary school teacher. The university awarded her a full blue for wheelchair basketball in 2015. She lives on the Gold Coast with her partner Matt McShane, a wheelchair basketballer.

== Wheelchair basketball ==
A 1.0 point Guard, she began playing wheelchair basketball for the Brisbane-based Queensland Comets in the Women's National Wheelchair Basketball League in 2011. The Comets won the league championship in 2014, a year in which she was named the league Most Valuable Player 1-pointer. In 2015, she averaged three points and four rebounds per game. She also played with the mixed National Wheelchair Basketball League competition.

In 2011, she was part of the Australian junior team (the Devils) at the 2011 Women's U25 Wheelchair Basketball World Championship in St. Catharines, Ontario, Canada, winning silver. Four years later she was captain of the Devils at the 2015 Women's U25 Wheelchair Basketball World Championship in Beijing, again winning silver.

She made her senior international debut with the Australia women's national wheelchair basketball team (the Gliders) that year at the Osaka Cup in Japan in February 2013. She subsequently played for the Gliders at the Osaka Cup in February 2015, the 2015 IWBF Asia-Oceania Championships in Chiba, Japan, in October 2015, the Osaka Cup in February 2016, and the 2017 IWBF Asia-Oceania Championships in Beijing in October 2017.

She represented Australia at the 2018 Wheelchair Basketball World Championship where the team came ninth.

At the 2020 Tokyo Paralympics, the Gliders finished ninth after winning the 9th–10th classification match.

She was a member of the Australian team that won the silver medal in the 3x3 Women's tournament at the 2022 Commonwealth Games.

== Wheelchair rugby ==
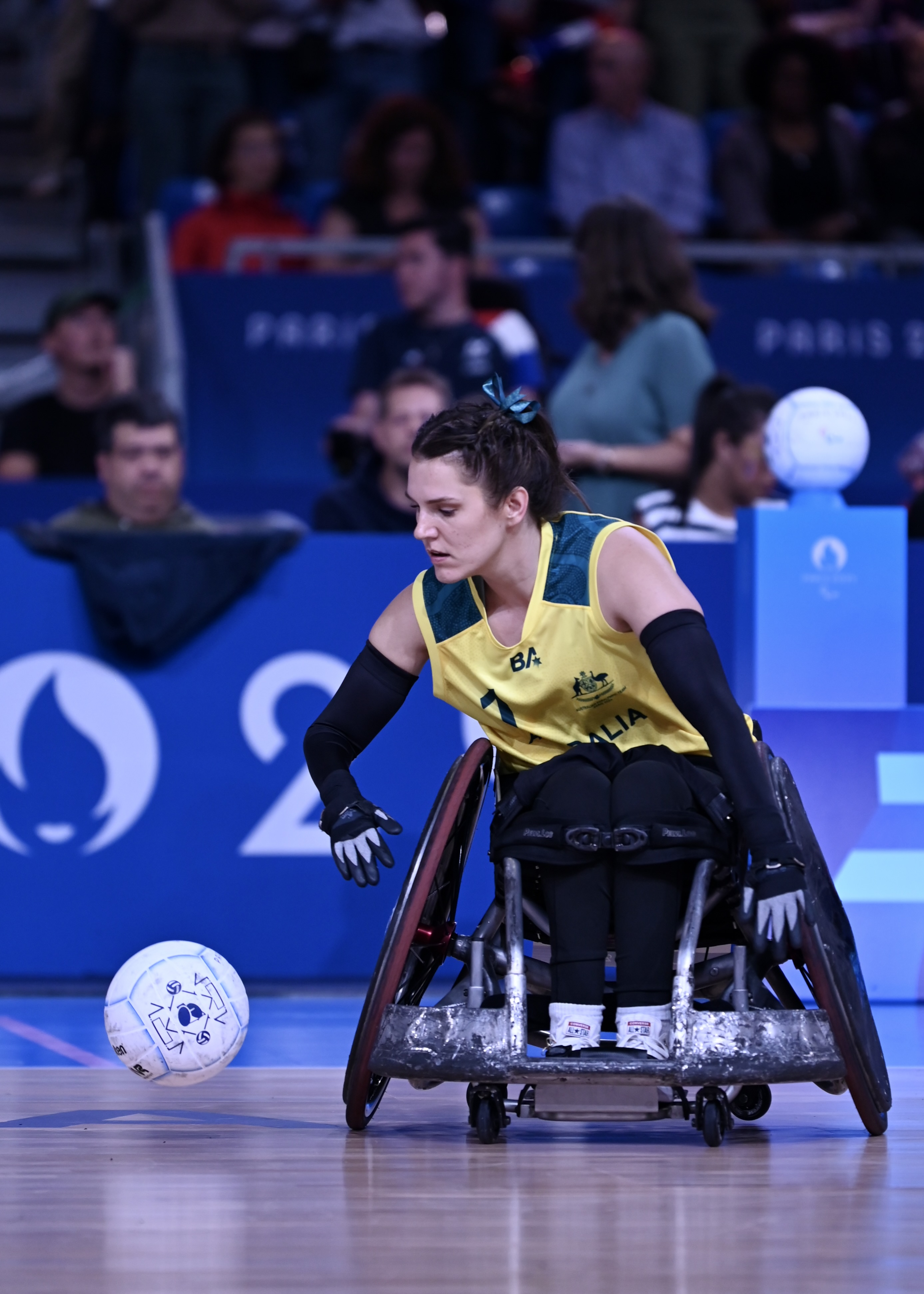
In action at the 2024 Summer Paralympics in Paris in August 2024

Sabljak classified as a 2.5 player won her first world championship gold medal at the 2022 IWRF World Championship in Vejle, Denmark, when Australia defeated the United States.

At the 2024 Summer Paralympics, she was a member of the Steelers that won the bronze medal defeating Great Britain 50–48.
