= David Gould (basketball) =

Australian wheelchair basketball player

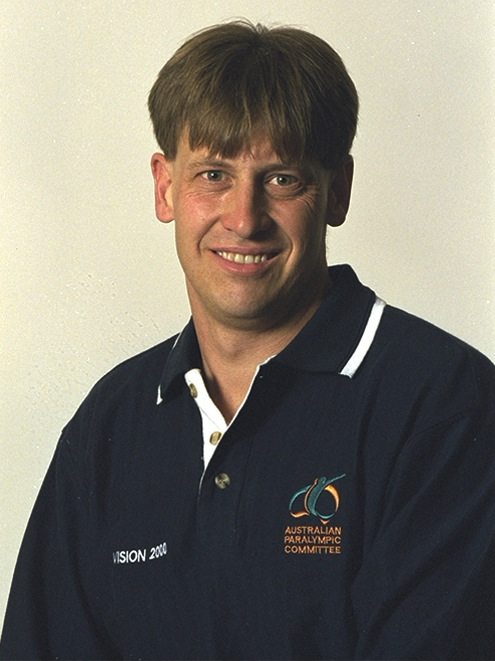
- David Gould's 2000 Australian Paralympic team portrait

Personal information
- Full name: David Ian Gould
- Nickname: Gouldy
- Nationality: Australia
- Born: 19 April 1965 (age 61) Adelaide, South Australia
Medal record
Wheelchair basketball
Paralympic Games – Athlete
Gold medal – first place	1996 Atlanta	Men's wheelchair basketball
Paralympic Games – Assistant Coach
Silver medal – second place	2012 London	Women's wheelchair basketball

David Ian Gould, OAM (born 19 April 1965) is an Australian wheelchair basketball player and coach.

Gould was part of the Australia men's national wheelchair basketball team at the 1984 New York/Stoke Mandeville, 1988 Seoul, 1992 Barcelona, 1996 Atlanta, and 2000 Sydney Paralympics. He was the top point scorer at the 1988 Seoul Paralympics, and won a gold medal as part of the winning 1996 team, for which he was awarded an Order of Australia Medal. In 2000, he received an Australian Sports Medal. He retired after the 2002 World Championships in Kitakyushu, Japan, but subsequently became assistant coach of the Australia women's national wheelchair basketball team at the 2012 London Paralympics, where they won silver.

In 2024, Gould was inducted into Australian Paralympic Hall of Fame

== Personal life ==
David Ian Gould was born in Adelaide on 19 April 1965. He is the youngest of three children, with an older brother and sister. He attended Croydon Park Primary School and Croydon High School in Adelaide. In July 1977, he became a paraplegic due to a near-fatal shooting accident.

Gould came from a sporting family; his sister played netball and his brother played basketball. He started playing basketball at the age of seven, and also played cricket for his school. He was selected for the South Australian Under 12 basketball team when he was eleven, and played against Andrew Gaze in a series against Victoria. After his accident, he began coaching junior basketball.

== Basketball ==
=== State team ===
When Gould was 15, he was introduced to the sport of wheelchair basketball. He was chosen to represent South Australia in 1982, and scored the winning shot that won his team the Australian championship. South Australia finished runner-up in 1983. Although it slipped to fourth in 1984, Gould was the team's best and fairest, and was selected in the All Star Five. He was Most Valuable Player in 1985, and was the top point scorer every year from 1984 to 1991. South Australia won the national championships again in 1986, with Gould as its best and fairest, and part of the All Star Five. He was selected to the All Star Five again every year from 1986 to 1992. South Australia was runner-up in 1987 and 1988, and won in 1989, 1990 and 1991.

Gould's South Australian team, now known as the Adelaide Thunder, won the National Wheelchair Basketball League (NWBL) championship in 1993. In 1994, with Gould as vice captain, the team were undefeated championships, and he received the Carlton United Disabled Sports Star Award. In 1995, Adelaide Thunder won the league championship for the third year in a row, and Gould was voted the league's Most Valuable Player. Playing for South Australia in the National Games in Sydney in April 1996, he was runner up as Most Valuable Player and Top Points Scorer, and selected in the All Star Five Team, despite only playing in four of the seven games.

Sidelined for most of the 1997 season due to an injury, Gould was still runner up Top Point Scorer, averaging 25.9 points per game, and was once again named part of the All Star Five. The following year he was part of the South Australian 3 on 3 team that won a tournament in Himeji, Japan. He became captain of Adelaide Thunder in 1999, and was once again its Top Points Scorer and Most Valuable Player. He was named to the league's All Star Five in 1998 and again in 2000.

=== National team ===
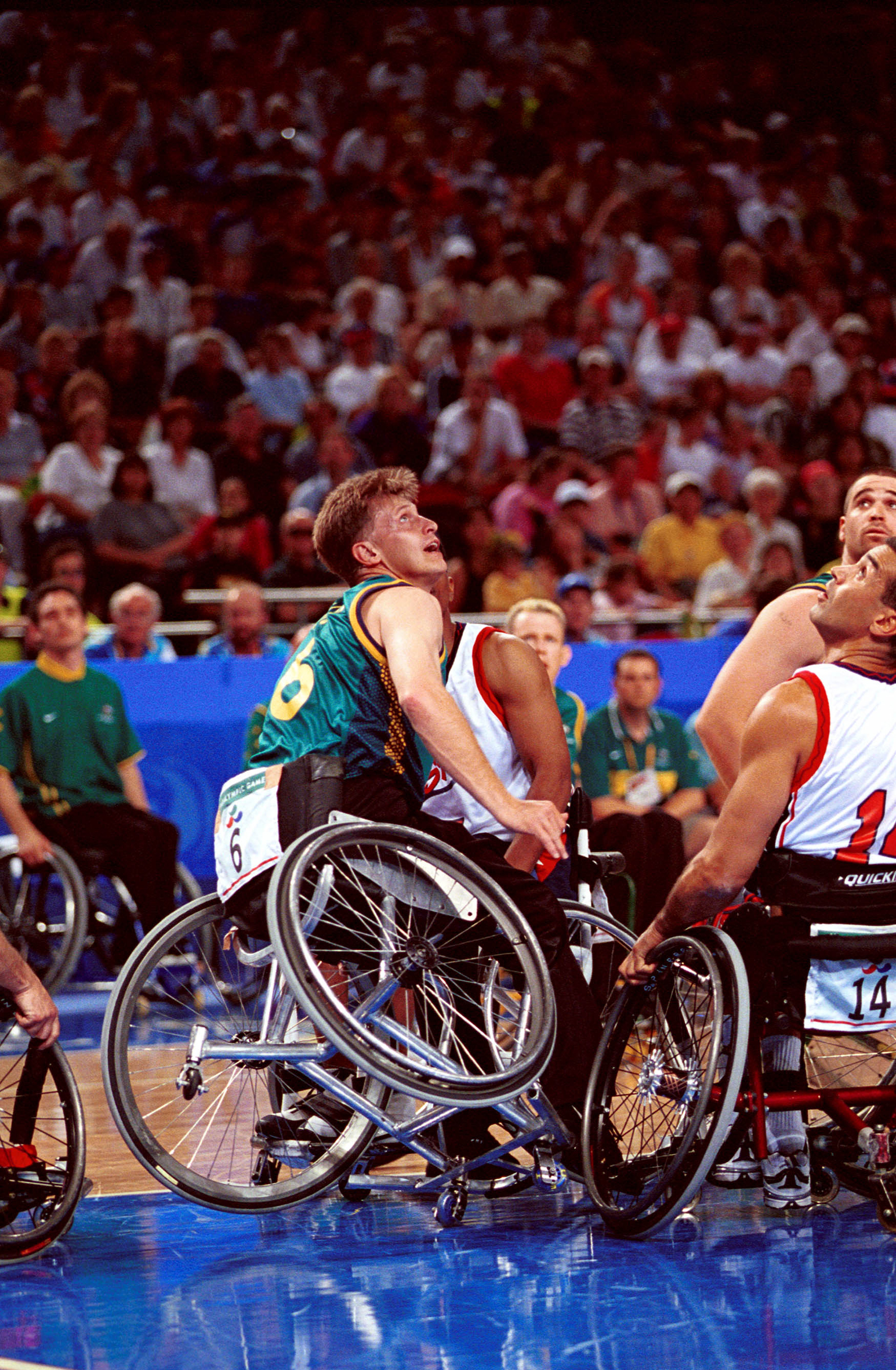
Gould's wheelchair lifts off the ground during a 2000 Sydney Paralympics match

Gould made the Australia men's national wheelchair basketball team in 1983, and played in the 1984 New York/Stoke Mandeville Paralympics, where the Australian team finished eleventh, its best ever performance. In 1985, he played at the Stoke Mandeville Games, winning a bronze medal. The Australians finished tenth at the Wheelchair Basketball World Championship in Melbourne in 1986, which was once again it best ever performance, and then went on to win the gold medal at the Stoke Mandeville Games that year. In his second Paralympic Games, the 1988 Seoul Paralympics, where Australia finished tenth. He was captain of the Australian team that played at the World Championships in Bruges in 1990. The Australians toured the United States in 1991, and played in the Stoke Mandeville Games. The following year he attended his third Paralympic Games, the 1992 Barcelona Paralympics, where the team finished seventh, and he was top offensive rebounder.

In 1994, Gould represented Australia in the Gold Cup Qualification tournament in Tehran, and was subsequently vice captain of the Gold Cup team which finished sixth in Edmonton later that year. He was named as a member of the World All Star Five, and was selected as part of a World team that competed against the United States in Atlanta. He captained the Australian Team at the Paralympic Qualification Tournament in Japan, where the Australian qualified and he was the tournament's top point scorer. He was captain of the national team at the 1996 Atlanta Paralympics where, for the first time, the Australian team won a Paralympic gold medal, for which he was awarded an Order of Australia Medal in the Australia Day Honours in January 1997.

Gould was co-captain of the national team, now known as the Rollers, at the World Wheelchair Basketball Championships in Sydney in 1998, where it finished fourth, and in the six-nation Roosevelt Cup tournament in the United States, where the Rollers finished sixth. He carried the Olympic torch at the 2000 Sydney Olympics, and subsequently carried the torch for the 2000 Sydney Paralympics, his fifth Paralympic Games. He played with the Rollers, who were placed fifth. In 2000, he received an Australian Sports Medal for his "many years service to the Paralympic movement as an basketball athlete". He retired from playing international basketball after the 2002 World Championships in Kitakyushu, Japan. When the National Wheelchair basketball Development was established in 2010, one of its four teams was named the David Gould Whites after him.

=== Coach ===
Gould returned to coaching, and became coach of the North Adelaide District Basketball Club Under 10 girls team in 2006, and then the Under 18 boys in 2008. He then became coach of Adelaide Thunder in 2009. In 2011, he became a full-time coach under the Australian Sports Commission Scholarship Coach Program. The following year he made a return to the Paralympics as an assistant coach of the Australia women's national wheelchair basketball team, known as the Gliders, at the 2012 London Paralympics, where they won silver, and acted as their head coach at the Osaka Cup in Japan in February 2013. In addition to being assistant coach of the Gliders, he was currently the assistant coach of the Under 23 Australian men's wheelchair basketball team, and coached the Women's Under 25 team at the 2015 Women's U25 Wheelchair Basketball World Championship in Beijing. In August 2016, he succeeded Tom Kyle as the Gliders' coach.
