= Sophie Carrigill =

British wheelchair basketball player

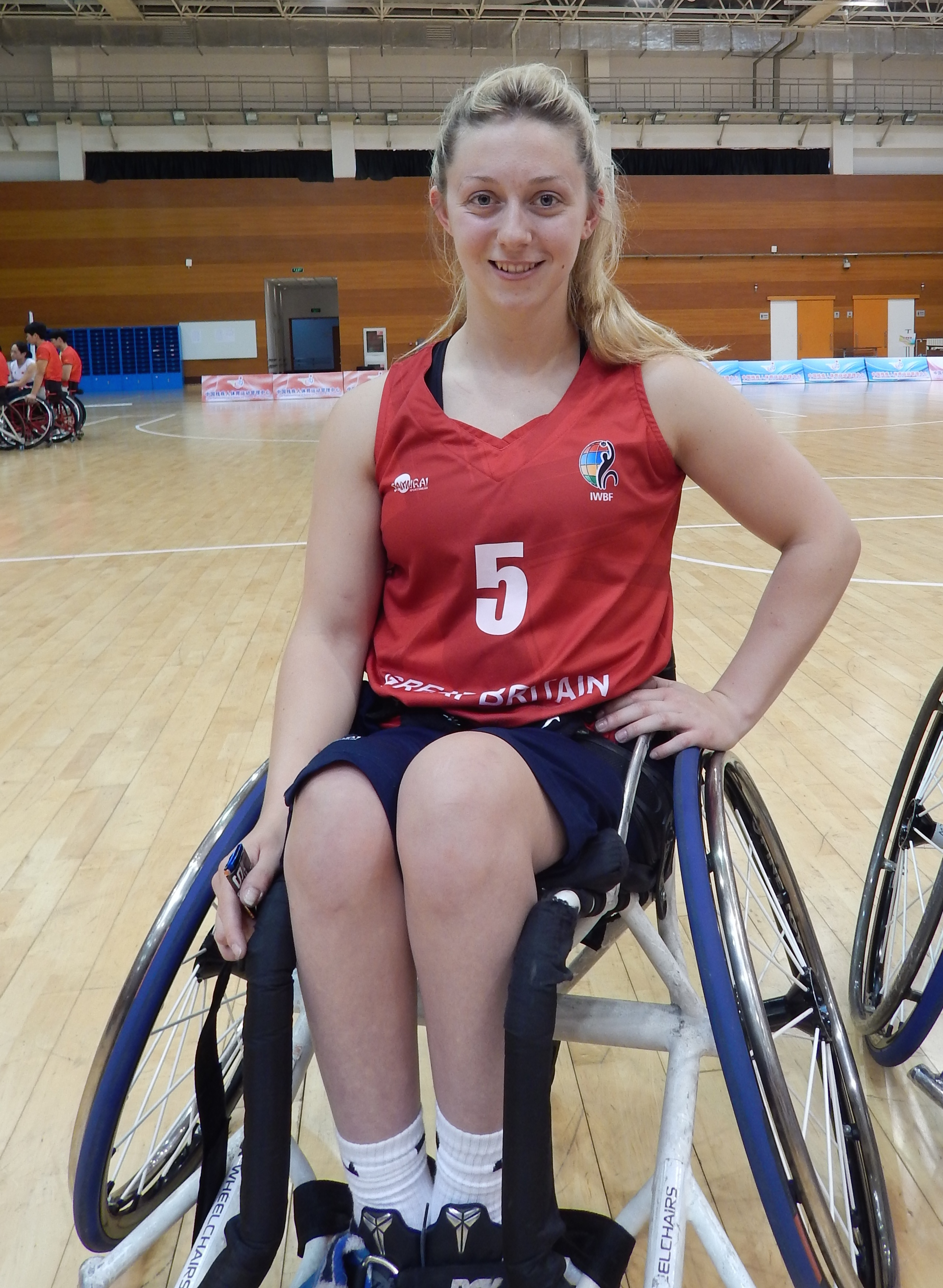
- Sophie Carrigill at the 2015 Women's U25 Wheelchair Basketball World Championship in Beijing

Personal information
- Nationality: United Kingdom
- Born: 19 January 1994 (age 32) Leeds, West Yorkshire
- Height: 5 ft 8 in (173 cm)

Sport
- Country: Great Britain
- Sport: Wheelchair basketball
- Disability class: 1.0
- Event: Women's team
- Club: Leeds Spiders; Coyotes
Medal record
Women's wheelchair basketball
Representing Great Britain
World Championships
Silver medal – second place	2018 Hamburg	Team
U25 Women's World Championships
Gold medal – first place	2015 Beijing	Team
European Championships
Silver medal – second place	2023 Rotterdam	Team
Silver medal – second place	2025 Sarajevo	Team
Bronze medal – third place	2013 Frankfurt	Team
Bronze medal – third place	2015 Worcester	Team
Bronze medal – third place	2017 Tenriffe	Team

Sophie Carrigill (born 19 January 1994) is a 1.0 point British wheelchair basketball player who represented Great Britain at the 2014 Women's World Wheelchair Basketball Championship in Toronto and the 2016 Paralympic Games in Rio de Janeiro.

== Biography ==
Sophie Carrigill was born on 19 January 1994. She attended Wakefield Girls' High School, where she played netball, hockey, and tennis. During a family holiday in the United States in 2010, she was a passenger in a car that crashed into a tree. Despite being the only person in the vehicle wearing a seat belt, she spent two months in hospital, where many of her organs were damaged and some removed including her gall bladder. Her kidney was damaged, and she fractured her T6 thoracic vertebrae, leaving her paralysed from the waist down. She subsequently spent two months in rehabilitation in the spinal unit at Pinderfields Hospital in Wakefield.

Carrigill took up playing wheelchair basketball. Within a year of playing her first game, she was selected to represent the eventual silver medallists Yorkshire in the U19 event at The Lord's Taverners National Junior Championships in 2012. She played for the Leeds Spiders in Divisions 1 and 3 of the BWB National League, and the Coyotes in the Standard Life GB Women's National League. She was chosen to carry the Olympic torch when it passed through Dewsbury in June 2012, received the Harry Mills Team Maker Award at the Youth Sport Trust National Talent Orientation Camp in 2013, and was awarded the ICAP Beckwith Scholarship. That year she took her A-levels in Psychology, Physical Education, and English Language, and entered the University of Worcester, where she studied Sports Psychology.

In April 2013, Carrigill made her international debut in a tournament against the Netherlands. She went on to represent Britain at the European Championships in Frankfurt later the same year, winning bronze, and was captain of the team at the World Wheelchair Basketball Championship in Toronto the following year. She played in the 2015 Women's U25 Wheelchair Basketball World Championship in Beijing, winning gold, and defeated France to take bronze in the 2015 European Championship. In May 2016, she was named as part of the team for the 2016 Summer Paralympics in Rio de Janeiro. The British team produced its best ever performance at the Paralympics, making it all the way to the semi-finals, but lost to the semi-final to the United States, and then the bronze medal match to the Netherlands.

On 29 May 2021, she appeared on I Can See Your Voice with her boyfriend Josh Landmann, another Paralympian.

== Achievements ==
- 2013: Bronze at European Championships (Frankfurt, Germany)
- 2014: Fifth at the World Wheelchair Basketball Championship (Toronto, Canada)
- 2015: Gold at the 2015 Women's U25 Wheelchair Basketball World Championship (Beijing, China)
- 2015: Bronze at the European Championships (Worcester, England)
- 2016: Fourth at the 2016 Paralympics (Rio de Janeiro, Brazil)
- 2017: Bronze at the European Championships (Tenerife, Spain)
- 2018: Silver at the 2018 Wheelchair Basketball World Championship (Hamburg, Germany)
