= China Administration of Sports for Persons with Disabilities =

Chinese disability sports organization

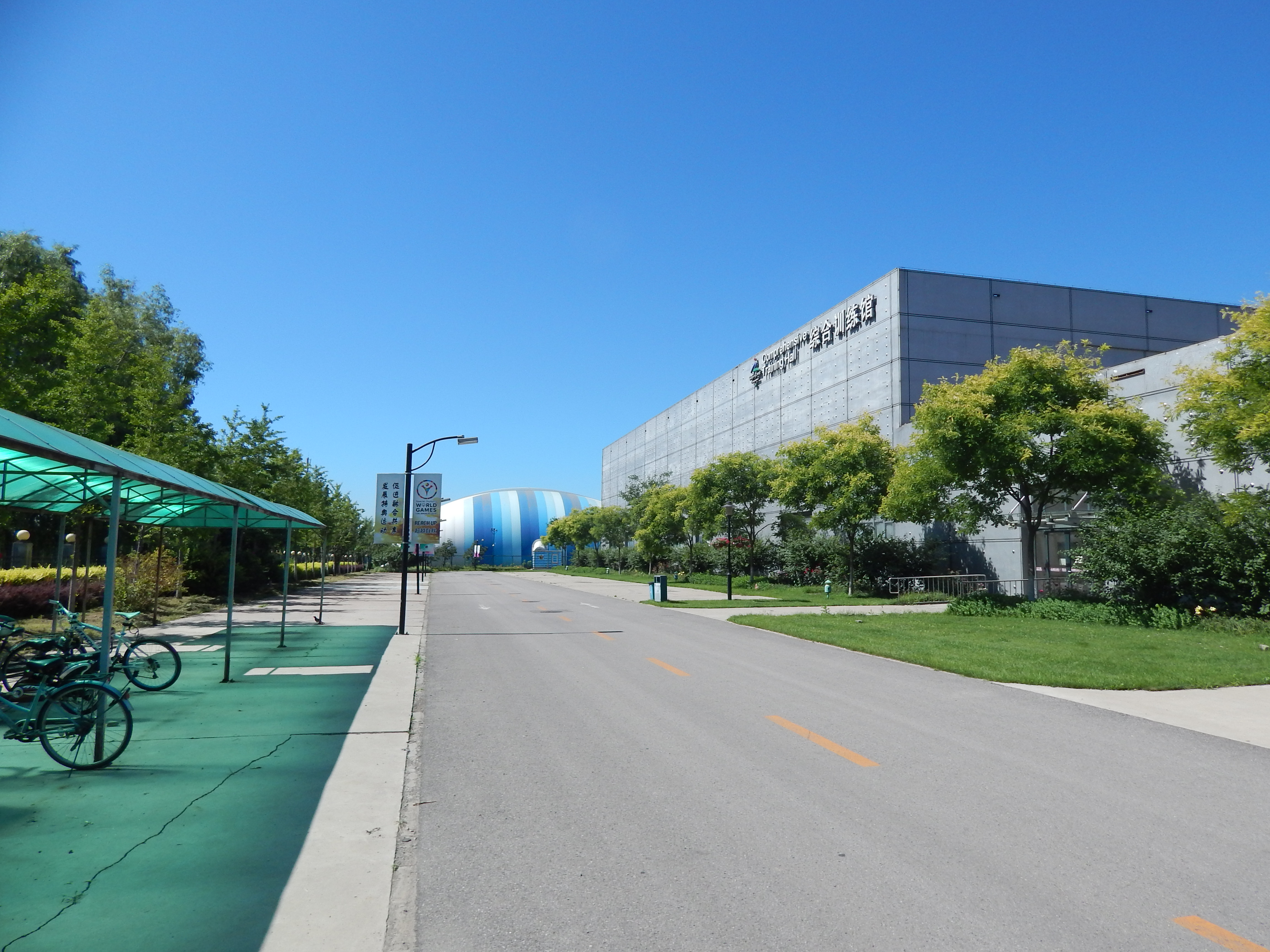
Comprehensive Training Hall

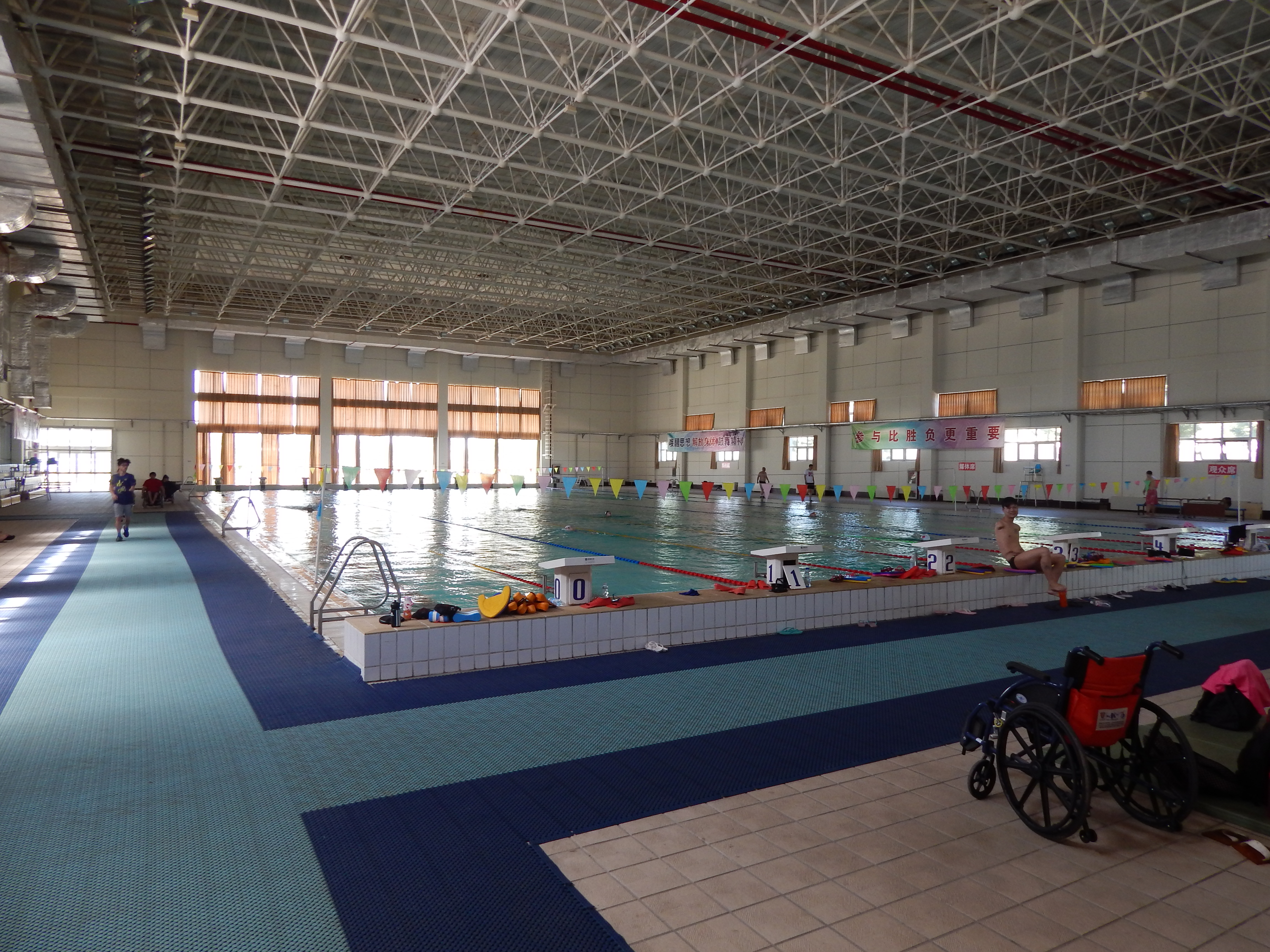
Swimming Hall

The China Administration of Sports for Persons with Disabilities (CASPD, Chinese: 中国残疾人体育运动管理中心) is a public institution of the Central Government of China, and is affiliated with the China Disabled Persons' Federation (CDPF). It is estimated that there are 85 million people with disabilities in China. The CASPD is responsible for the administration of disability sports in China. Its work includes developing sporting standards, carrying out sports research, undertaking sports drug testing, and directing sports training programs. It also manages the China Disability Sports Training Centre (CDSTC) in Beijing.

== China Disability Sports Training Centre ==
The CDSTC opened on 28 June 2007. It was the first facility in China entirely devoted to disability sports training, and the largest of its kind in the world. It is some 238,235 square metres (2,564,340 sq ft) in area. There are apartments for accommodating athletes, along with supporting structures such as a cafeteria and recreation areas. There are research laboratories and office spaces, and facilities for holding sporting events and training workshops.

Sports facilities include a multifunction gymnasium, a goalball hall, four indoor and five outdoor tennis courts, two outdoor soccer fields, two archery fields, a velodrome, outdoor athletic field with a grandstand, a swimming hall and fishing pond. In total there are 72,382 square metres (779,110 sq ft) of buildings and 68,183 square metres (733,920 sq ft) of outdoor sports facilities.

The entire complex is wheelchair accessible. The Chinese team used it as its training and preparation centre for the 2008 Summer Paralympics, which were held in Beijing. Communist party General secretary Hu Jintao and Politburo standing committee member Xi Jinping visited the Paralympic team there on 20 August 2008.
