= Linda Dahle =

German wheelchair basketball player

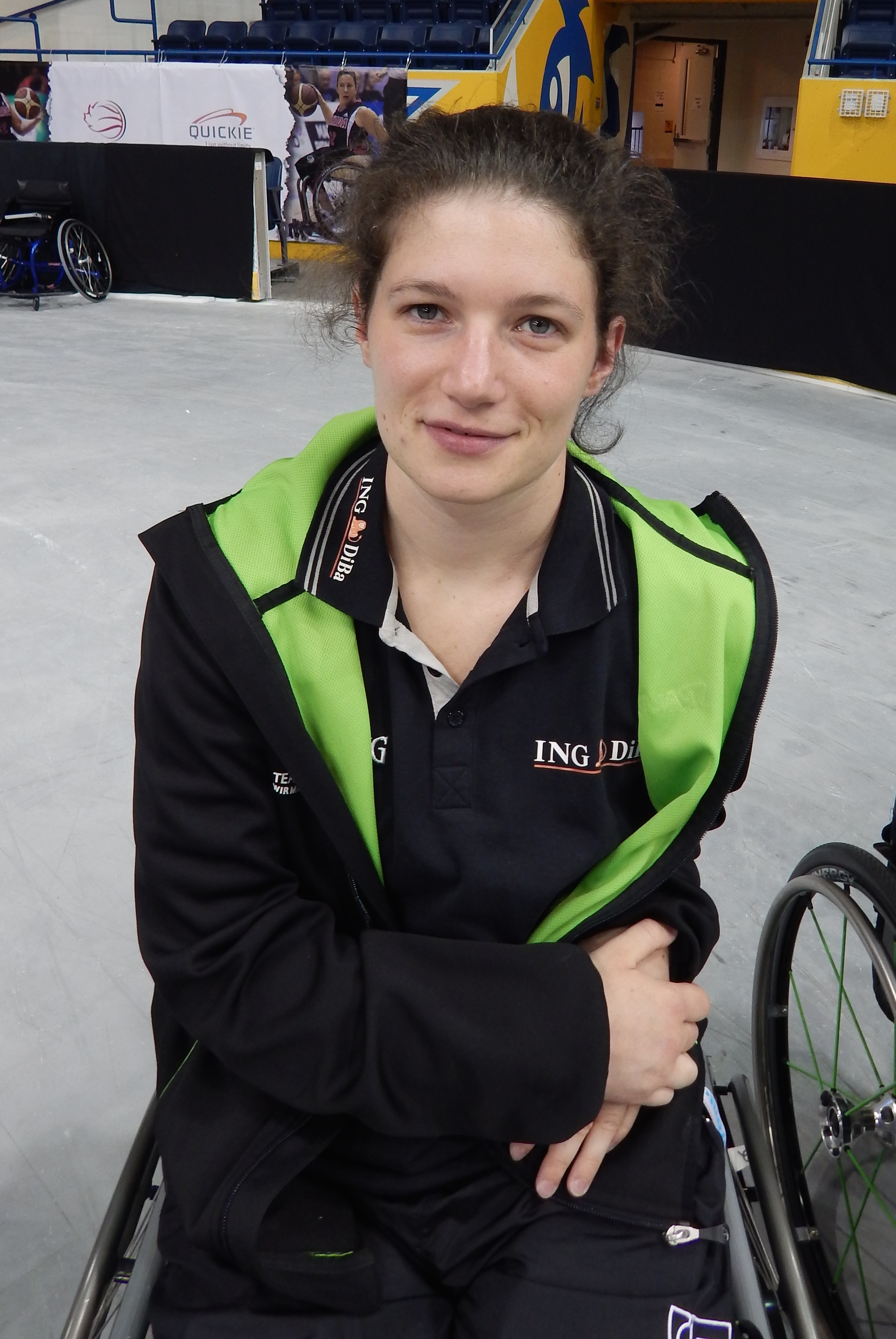

Personal information
- Nationality: Germany
- Born: 8 November 1991 (age 34)

Sport
- Country: Germany
- Sport: Wheelchair basketball
- Disability class: 4.5
- Event: Women's team
- Club: Hannover United
Medal record
Wheelchair basketball
IWBF World Championship
Silver medal – second place	2014 Toronto, Canada	Women's wheelchair basketball

Linda Dahle (born 8 November 1991) is a German 4.5 point national wheelchair basketball player who plays for Hannover United, and for the German national team. She won a bronze medal at the U25 European Wheelchair Basketball Championships in August 2013, where she was the team's top scorer with 42 points. She made her senior national team debut in June 2014, winning silver at the 2014 Women's World Wheelchair Basketball Championship in Toronto.

== Biography ==
Linda Dahle was born in Düsseldorf on 8 November 1991. When she was 16, she was forced to give up playing basketball due to severe cartilage damage in her left foot. She then took up wheelchair basketball, with a classification of 4.5 point, the lowest level of disability. She is studying social work degree at the University of Nijmegen.

Dahle moved to Cologne to play with its RBB 99ers. She also coached the U15 girls in Düsseldorf. In 2011, she played with the German team at the U25 Women's World Cup in St. Catharines, Ontario, Canada, where the German team came sixth. This was followed by a bronze medal at the U25 European Wheelchair Basketball Championships at Stoke Mandeville, England, in August 2013, where she was the team's top scorer with 42 points. She was also a key player in the Hot Rolling Bears' two point win over Bonn in Wheelchair Basketball Junior National Championship in 2014.

In June 2014, Dahle joined the senior women's team for the 2014 Women's World Wheelchair Basketball Championship in Toronto, Canada. The German team won silver after being defeated by Canada in the final.

== Achievements ==
- 2013: Bronze at U25 European Wheelchair Basketball Championships (Stoke Mandeville, England)
- 2014: Silver at the World Championships (Toronto, Canada)
- 2015: Gold at the European Championships (Worcester, England)
