= Maude Jacques =

Canadian wheelchair basketball player (1992–2023)

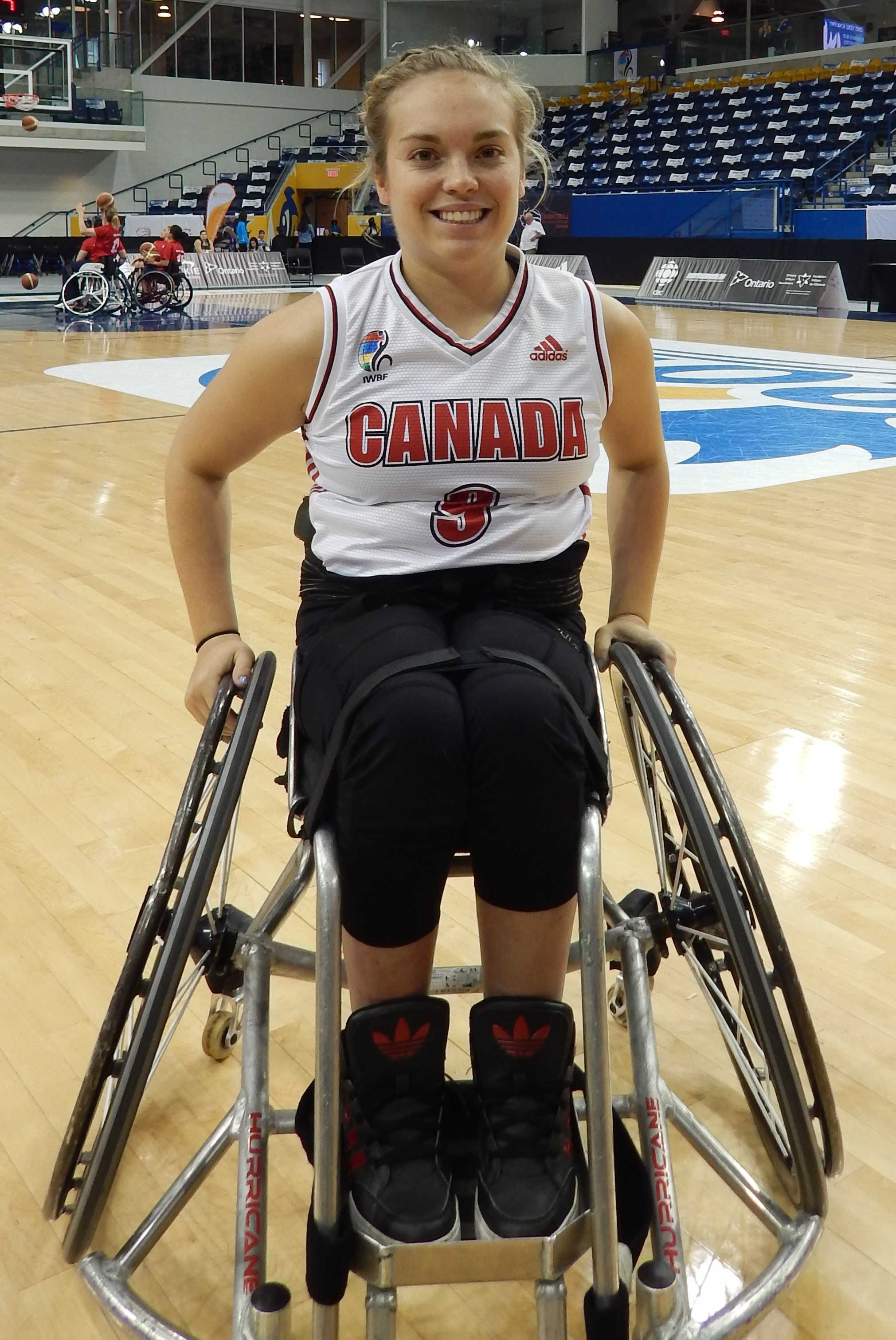
- Jacques with the Canada national team

Personal information
- Nationality: Canada
- Born: April 21, 1992 Sherbrooke, Quebec, Canada
- Died: October 8, 2023 (aged 31) Sherbrooke, Quebec, Canada
- Height: 4 ft 9 in (1.45 m)

Sport
- Country: Canada
- Sport: Wheelchair basketball
- Disability class: 2.5
- Event: Women's team
- College team: University of Alabama
Medal record
Women's wheelchair basketball
Representing Canada
World Championship
Gold medal – first place	2014 Toronto	Team
Parapan American Games
Gold medal – first place	2019 Lima	Team
Silver medal – second place	2011 Guadalajara	Team
Silver medal – second place	2015 Toronto	Team

Maude Jacques (April 21, 1992 – October 8, 2023) was a Canadian 2.5 point Paralympic wheelchair basketball player who won a gold medal at the 2014 Women's World Wheelchair Basketball Championship in Toronto.

== Biography ==
Maude Jacques was born in Sherbrooke, Quebec, on April 21, 1992. She was introduced to wheelchair basketball in 2001 by her physiotherapist. She first played for a mini-team in her home town, and then for club teams. She represented Quebec at the 2011 Canada Games, where her team won a gold medal. That year she was selected first to the U25 national team, and then to the senior women's national team. She played with the U25 team at the 2011 U25 World Championships in St. Catharines, Ontario, where Team Canada came fourth, and then the senior team at the 2011 Parapan American Games in Guadalajara, Mexico, where Team Canada came second. The following year she made her Paralympic debut at the 2012 Summer Paralympic Games in London, where Team Canada came sixth. Afterwards she joined the women's wheelchair basketball team at the University of Alabama. In July 2014, she was part of the team that won a gold medal at the 2014 Women's World Wheelchair Basketball Championship in Toronto. The University of Alabama wheelchair basketball team of which she was part won their fourth national championship in the seven years in 2015 with a 58–52 win over the University of Illinois. In August 2015, she was part of the team that won silver at the 2015 Parapan American Games, but the following year she was omitted from the team for the 2016 Paralympic Games in Rio de Janeiro. She retired from the sport in 2020.

In wheelchair tennis, she won the Birmingham National Championships in 2015, becoming the Canadian national champion. She participated in the 2016 Alabama Open in August 2016, and the Birmingham National Championships in October 2016.

Jacques died at a hospital in Sherbrooke on October 8, 2023, at the age of 31 from a bacterial infection.

Paralympic Games
Competition	Season	Matches	FGM-A	FG%	3PM-A	3P%	FTM-A	FT%	TOT	AST	PTS
Paralympic Games	2012	5	1-8	13	0-0	0	0-0	0	5	4	2

Key
FGM, FGA, FG%: field goals made, attempted and percentage	3PM, 3PA, 3P%: three-point field goals made, attempted and percentage
FTM, FTA, FT%: free throws made, attempted and percentage	OR, DR: offensive, defensive rebounds
PTS: points	AST: assists

== Awards ==
- Queen Elizabeth II Diamond Jubilee Medal (2013)
