= Leah Evans =

British wheelchair basketball player

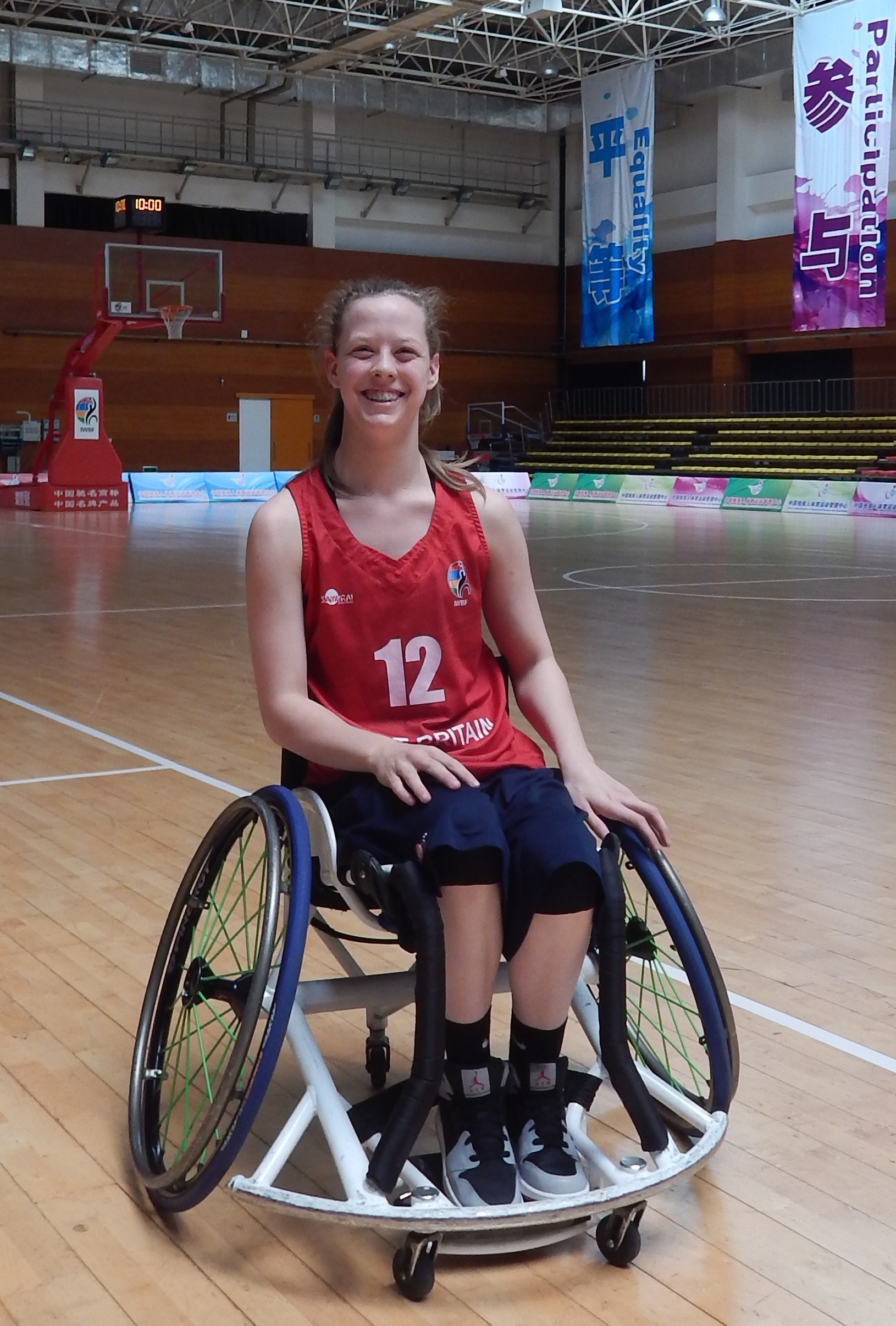
- Evans in 2015

Personal information
- Nationality: United Kingdom
- Born: 5 March 1997 (age 29) Wakefield
- Height: 5 ft 7 in (170 cm)

Sport
- Country: Great Britain
- Sport: Wheelchair basketball
- Disability class: 2.0
- Event: Women's team
- Club: Sheffield Steelers
Medal record
Wheelchair basketball
U25 Women's World Championships
Gold medal – first place	2015 Beijing, China	Women's wheelchair basketball
European Championships
Bronze medal – third place	2015 Worcester, England	Women's wheelchair basketball
Bronze medal – third place	2017 Tenriffe, Spain	Women's wheelchair basketball
Women's World Championships
Silver medal – second place	2018 Hamburg, Germany	Women's wheelchair basketball

Leah Evans (born 5 March 1997) is a 2.0 point British wheelchair basketball player who represented Great Britain at the 2015 Women's U25 Wheelchair Basketball World Championship in Beijing.

== Biography ==
Leah Evans was born in Wakefield, on 5 March 1997. She was born with a rare hip condition that restricted her growth and movement. When she was four years old, she was told that she would never walk. However, she did and also danced six days a week. In 2012, she had a serious fall. She was taken to hospital where her hip was surgically reconstructed. She was given the news that she would require a wheelchair, and would not be able to dance.

Although Evans had never been what she calls a "sporty type", she took up wheelchair basketball in 2013. She is a 2.5 point player. She began playing for the Sheffield Steelers. She played for England North at the Sainsbury's School Games in 2013, winning gold, and was captain of the team in 2014, winning silver. That year she played with the U25 national team at the European Championships in Hanover, Germany, where she won silver, and with the Steelers at the Copper Box in the National Paralympic Day game against the Netherlands. In 2015, she made her debut with the senior team at the Osaka Cup in Japan, winning silver, won a gold medal at the 2015 Women's U25 Wheelchair Basketball World Championship in Beijing, and played for the senior team at European Championships in Worcester, winning bronze. She launched an appeal to help buy a new sports chair, which costs £3750. In May 2016, she was named as part of the team for the 2016 Summer Paralympics in Rio de Janeiro. The British team produced its best ever performance at the Paralympics, making it to the semi-finals, but lost in the semi-final to the United States, and then the bronze medal match to the Netherlands.

Evans completed her A-levels, and in September 2015 entered the University of Worcester, where she intends to study Sports Science.

== Achievements ==
- 2014: Silver at the 2014 Women's U25 Wheelchair Basketball European Championship (Hanover, Germany)
- 2015: Silver at the Osaka Cup (Osaka, Japan)
- 2015: Gold at the 2015 Women's U25 Wheelchair Basketball World Championship (Beijing, China)
- 2015: Bronze at the European Championships (Worcester, England)
- 2016: Fourth at the 2016 Paralympics (Rio de Janeiro, Brazil)
- 2017: Bronze at the European Championships (Tenerife, Spain)
- 2018: Silver at the 2018 Wheelchair Basketball World Championship (Hamburg, Germany)
