= Charlotte Moore (wheelchair basketball) =

British wheelchair basketball player

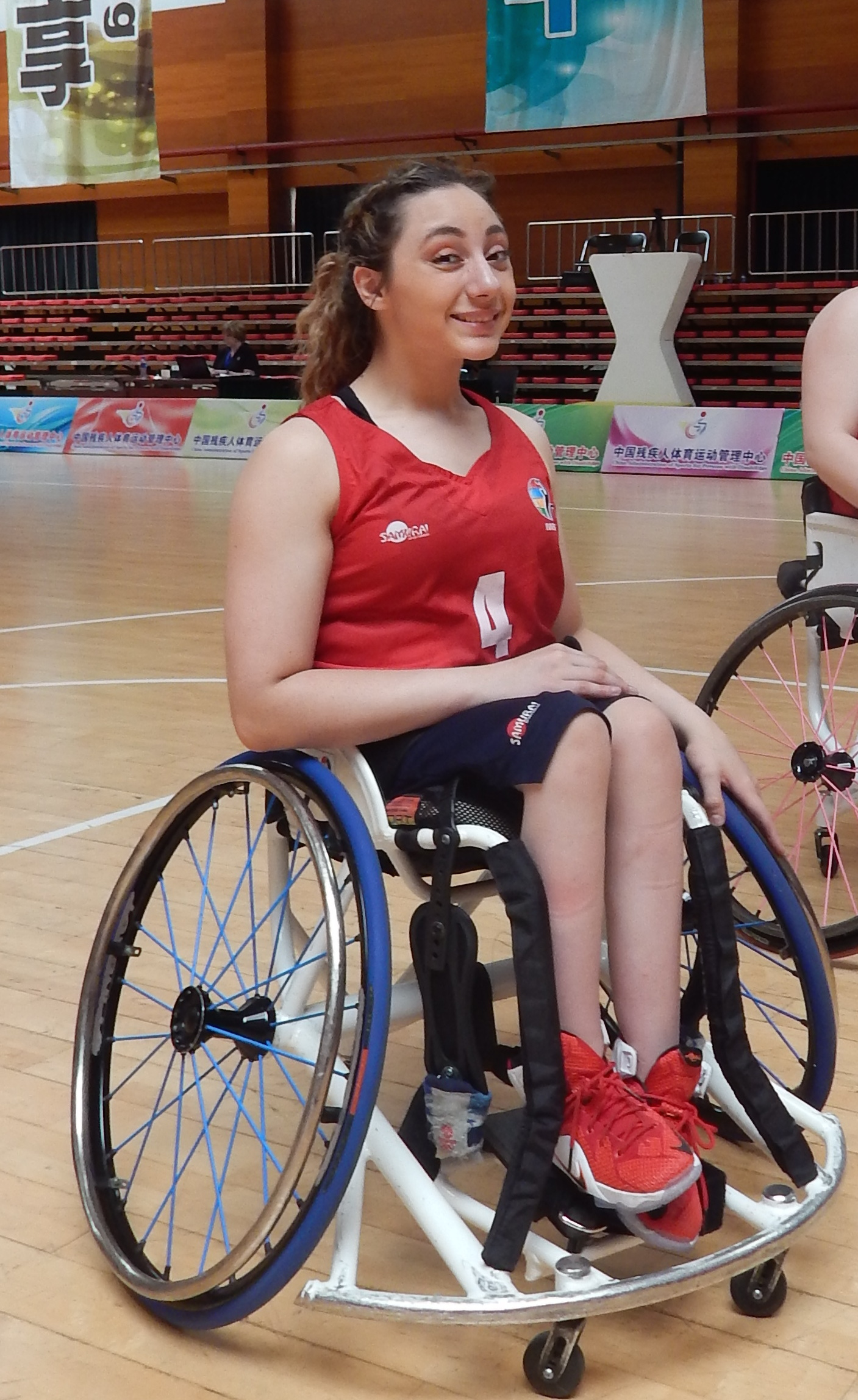
- Charlotte Moore at the 2015 Women's U25 Wheelchair Basketball World Championship in Beijing

Personal information
- Nationality: United Kingdom
- Born: 13 September 1998 (age 28)

Sport
- Country: Great Britain
- Sport: Wheelchair basketball
- Disability class: 1.0
- Event: Women's team
- Club: Coventry Wheelchair Basketball Academy
Medal record
Women's wheelchair basketball
Representing Great Britain
World Championships
Silver medal – second place	2018 Hamburg	Team
U25 Women's World Championships
Gold medal – first place	2015 Beijing	Team
European Championships
Silver medal – second place	2023 Rotterdam	Team
Silver medal – second place	2025 Sarajevo	Team
Bronze medal – third place	2013 Frankfurt	Team
Bronze medal – third place	2015 Worcester	Team
Bronze medal – third place	2017 Tenriffe	Team
Women's 3x3 wheelchair basketball
Representing England
Commonwealth Games
Gold medal – first place	2026 Glasgow	Team
Bronze medal – third place	2022 Birmingham	Team

Charlotte Moore (born 13 September 1998) is a wheelchair racer who has won four Virgin London wheelchair mini-marathons, a wheelchair tennis player and a 1.0 point wheelchair basketball player who represented Great Britain at the 2014 Women's World Wheelchair Basketball Championship in Toronto and the 2018 Wheelchair Basketball World Championship in Hamburg.

== Biography ==
Charlotte Moore was born on 13 September 1998, and began playing wheelchair basketball when she was eight years old. She is classified as a 1.0 point player. She played for the Coventry Ladies AllStars (formerly West Midlands AllStars), and the Coventry Wheelchair Basketball Academy (CWBA) First and Second Teams in the British Wheelchair Basketball National League. She was named the Peter Jackson Young Female Player of the Year in 2012, and made her international debut in the Standard Life Head to Head series against the Netherlands in 2013 when she was 14. This was followed by the U25 European Wheelchair Basketball Championships, where Team Great Britain won the silver medal.

As a wheelchair racer, Moore has won four Virgin London wheelchair mini-marathons. She also plays wheelchair tennis. She was chosen to carry the London 2012 Olympic Torch when the torch relay passed through Warwick on 1 July 2012.

In 2013, Moore was part of the team that won bronze at the European Championship, and silver at the U25 European Championships. The team came fifth at the 2014 Women's World Wheelchair Basketball Championship in Toronto. She won silver at the Osaka Cup in Japan in February 2015, and played in the 2015 Women's U25 Wheelchair Basketball World Championship in Beijing, winning gold, and defeated France to take bronze in the 2015 European Championship. In May 2016, she was named as part of the team for the 2016 Summer Paralympics in Rio de Janeiro. The British team produced its best ever performance at the Paralympics, making it all the way to the semi-finals, but lost to the semi-final to the United States, and then the bronze medal match to the Netherlands.

== Achievements ==
- 2013: Bronze at European Championships (Frankfurt, Germany)
- 2014: Fifth at the World Wheelchair Basketball Championship (Toronto, Canada)
- 2015: Silver at the Osaka Cup (Osaka, Japan)
- 2015: Gold at the 2015 Women's U25 Wheelchair Basketball World Championship (Beijing, China)
- 2015: Bronze at the European Championships (Worcester, England)
- 2016: Fourth at the Rio Paralympics
- 2017: Bronze at the European Championships (Tenerife, Spain)
- 2018: Silver at the 2018 Wheelchair Basketball World Championship (Hamburg, Germany)
