= Jordanna Bartlett =

British wheelchair basketball player

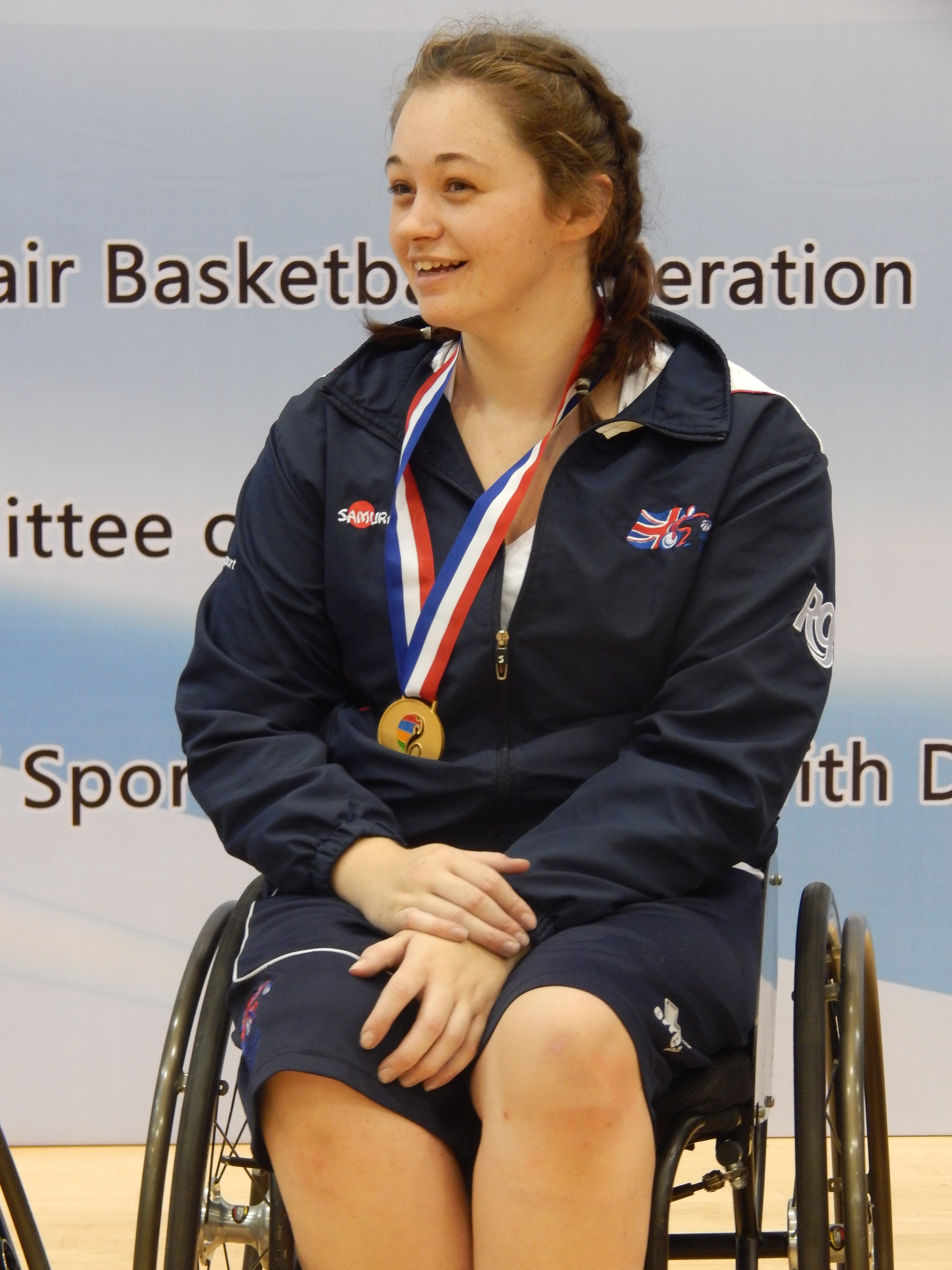
- Jordannna Bartlett at the 2015 Women's U25 Wheelchair Basketball World Championship in Beijing

Personal information
- Nationality: United Kingdom
- Born: 15 December 1994 (age 31) Preston, Lancashire

Sport
- Country: Great Britain
- Sport: Wheelchair basketball
- Disability class: 3.0
- Event: Women's team
- Club: Manchester Mavericks
Medal record
Wheelchair basketball
U25 Women's World Championships
Gold medal – first place	2015 Beijing, China	Women's wheelchair basketball
European Championships
Bronze medal – third place	2015 Worcester, England	Women's wheelchair basketball

Jordanna Bartlett (born 15 December 1994) is a 3.0 point British wheelchair basketball player who represented Great Britain at the 2015 Women's U25 Wheelchair Basketball World Championship in Beijing.

== Biography ==
Jordanna Bartlett was born on 15 December 1994. She damaged her hip in a trampolining accident when she was 11. She attended Altrincham College of Arts in Trafford, and the University of Worcester. In 2011 she was the "Trafford Disabled Sports Person of the Year", and won an Endeavour Award for her outstanding contribution to sport despite adversity in 2012. "Jordanna is one of the most inspiring cases we’ve had," explained Dr Jackie Campbell of the Sale Chamber of Commerce, the body presenting the award, "because not only does she excel in school and in sport, but she also presents talks and inspires others to succeed."

Bartlett took up wheelchair basketball as a 3.0 point player, and immediately started playing club competition with the Manchester Mavericks. She won silver with England North at Sainsbury's School Games in 2011. She went one better the following year, winning gold. She made her international debut with the U25 team at the 2011 Women's U25 World Championships in St. Catharines, Canada, where the U25 British team won bronze. In 2012 she made her international debut with the senior team against the Netherlands, and won silver with them at the Osaka Cup in Japan in February 2013, She was part of the U25 Women's Team that won silver at the Women's U25 European Championships in Stoke Mandeville, in 2012 and Hanover, Germany, in 2013, and went on to represent Britain at the 2015 Women's U25 Wheelchair Basketball World Championship in Beijing, winning gold, and the 2015 European Championship in Worcester, winning bronze. In May 2016, she was named as part of the team for the 2016 Summer Paralympics in Rio de Janeiro. The British team produced its best ever performance at the Paralympics, making it all the way to the semi-finals, but lost to the semi-final to the United States, and then the bronze medal match to the Netherlands.

== Achievements ==
- 2011: Bronze at the 2011 Women's U25 Wheelchair Basketball World Championship (St. Catherines, Canada)
- 2015: Gold at the 2015 Women's U25 Wheelchair Basketball World Championship (Beijing, China)
- 2015: Bronze at the European Championships (Worcester, England)
