= Annabel Breuer =

German wheelchair fencer and wheelchair basketball player

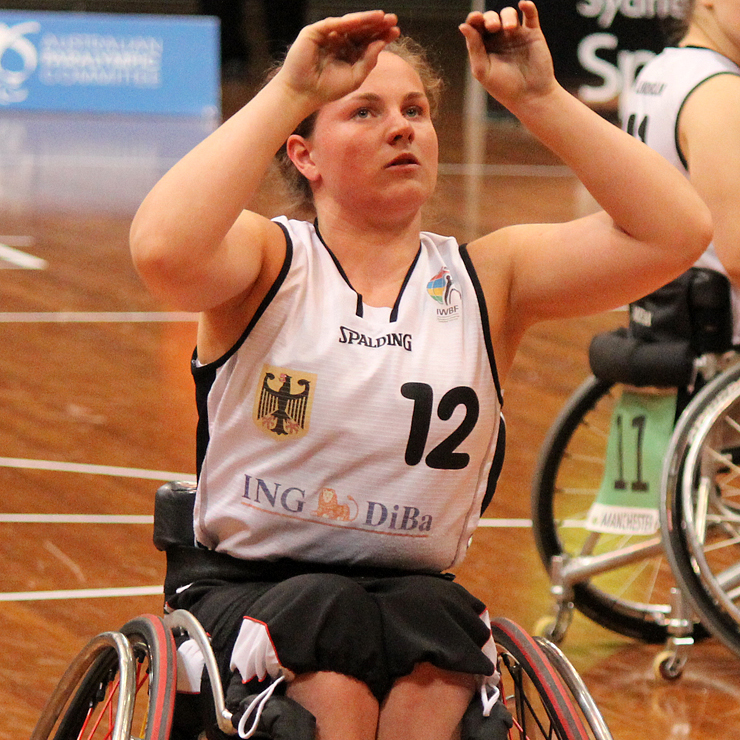
- Annabel Breuer in Sydney, July 2012

Personal information
- Born: 23 October 1992 (age 33) Biberach, Swabia

Sport
- Country: Germany
- Sport: Wheelchair basketball
- Disability class: 1.5
- Event: Women's team
- Team: SKV Ravensburg; Ulm Sabres; RSV Lahn-Dill

Achievements and titles
- Paralympic finals: 2012 Paralympics, 2016 Paralympics
Medal record
Women's wheelchair basketball
Representing Germany
Paralympic Games
Gold medal – first place	2012 London	Team
Silver medal – second place	2016 Rio de Janeiro	Team
World Championship
Silver medal – second place	2010 Birmingham	Team
Silver medal – second place	2014 Toronto	Team
Bronze medal – third place	2018 Hamburg	Team

Annabel Breuer (born 23 October 1992) is German a wheelchair fencer and 1.5 point wheelchair basketball player. She has played for SKV Ravensburg and Sabres Ulm in the German wheelchair basketball league. In December 2012 she was contracted to play for first division club RSV Lahn-Dill as well as Sabres Ulm. She has also played the national team, with which she won two European titles, was runner-up at 2010 World Championships, and won a gold medal at the 2012 Summer Paralympics in London. After the London Games, President Joachim Gauck awarded the team Germany's highest sporting honour, the Silbernes Lorbeerblatt (Silver Laurel Leaf).

== Biography ==
Annabel Breuer was born on 23 October 1992. She lives with her three siblings, her parents and her dog in Birkenhardt, a small town in Swabia roughly halfway between Lake Constance and Ulm. She became a paraplegic as a result of an automotive accident when she was a child.

Breuer started playing wheelchair fencing recreationally. She won silver at the 2006 Wheelchair Fencing World Cup in Turin at the age of 13. but was unable to participate in the 2008 Summer Paralympics in Beijing due to surgery on her spinal cord. At the 2009 European Championships in Warsaw she won gold with the German epee team, and silver and bronze in the singles. As a result, the German Sports Foundation named 16-year-old Breuer as its Junior Sportsman of the Year for 2009 in Disability Sport. She competed in the 2010 World Championships in Paris, but was placed fifth and did not medal. She was awarded the Hilde Frey Prize in 2011, and said that her goal was to be at the 2012 Summer Paralympic Games in London.

Breuer attended the Paralympics in London, but as a wheelchair basketball player rather than as a fencer. She was introduced to the sport by a friend, and spotted by a national trainer. Breuer played for Sabines Ulm, where she was the only woman on a mixed gender side. She is classified as a 1.5 point player, but women get a 1.5 point bonus when playing on a mixed team, making her in effect a zero-point player. Her classification, along with her high technical acumen, means that she is a valuable asset on any team.

Breuer was part of the German national team which won gold at the 2011 European Championships in Nazareth, Israel, defeating the Netherlands in the final, 48–42. In June 2012 she was named as one of the team that competed at the 2012 Summer Paralympic Games in London. In the Gold Medal match, the team faced the Australia women's national wheelchair basketball team, a team that had defeated them 48–46 in Sydney just a few months before. They defeated the Australians 44–58 in front of a crowd of over 12,000 at the North Greenwich Arena to win the gold medal, They were awarded another Silver Laurel Leaf by President Joachim Gauck in November 2012, and were again named Team of the Year for 2012. In a ceremony in Ulm, Breuer was congratulated by the Lord Mayor, Ivo Gönner, and her name was entered in the Golden Book of the city. In December 2012, it was announced that in addition to playing for second division Sabres Ulm, she would also play for five-time Champions League winning first division club RSV Lahn-Dill in 2013.

As of February 2013, due to the constant interruptions to her education due to training and competitions, Breuer, who speaks English, French, German and Spanish, had yet to complete her final high school examinations at Matthias Erzberger school in Biberach. The German team claimed silver at the 2014 Women's World Wheelchair Basketball Championship in Toronto, Ontario, Canada, and beat the Netherlands in the 2015 European Championships, to claim its tenth European title. At the 2016 Paralympic Games, it won silver after losing the final to the United States.

== Achievements ==
- 2006: Silver Wheelchair Fencing World Cup (Turin, Italy)
- 2009: Gold (team), Silver and Bronze (individual) European Championships (Warsaw, Poland)
- 2010: Silver World Championships (Birmingham, Great Britain)
- 2011: Gold European Championships (Nazareth, Israel)
- 2012: Gold Paralympic Games (London, England)
- 2013: Silver European Championships (Frankfurt, Germany)
- 2014: Silver at the World Championships (Toronto, Canada)
- 2015: Gold at the European Championships (Worcester, England)
- 2016: Silver at the Paralympic Games (Rio de Janeiro, Brazil)

== Awards ==
- 2009: Junior Sportsman of the Year in Disability Sport
- 2012: Team of the Year
- 2012: Silver Laurel Leaf
- 2012: Entry in the Golden Book of the city of Ulm
- 2015: Gold at the European Championships (Worcester, England)
