= Rosalie Lalonde =

Canadian wheelchair basketball player

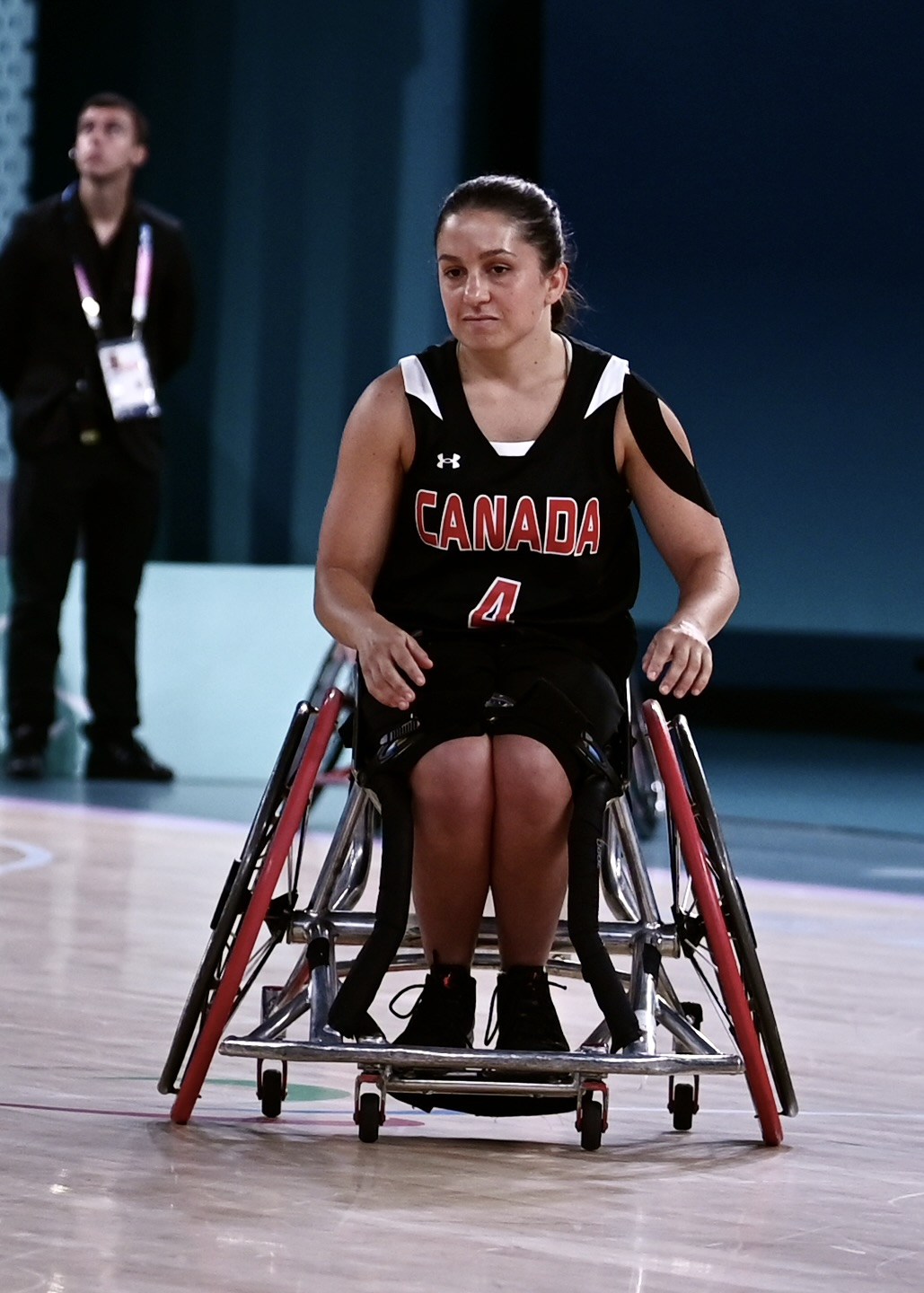
- Lalonde at the 2024 Summer Paralympics

Personal information
- Nicknames: Rosie, Rosa
- Nationality: Canada
- Born: March 27, 1997 (age 29) Montreal, Quebec
- Height: 145 cm (4 ft 9 in)

Sport
- Sport: Wheelchair basketball
- Disability class: 3.0
- Event: Women's team
- College team: University of Alabama
- Coached by: Marc-Antoine Ducharmes

Achievements and titles
- Paralympic finals: 2016, 2021
- National finals: 2017, 2018, 2019
Medal record
Women's wheelchair basketball
Representing Canada
Parapan American Games
Gold medal – first place	2019 Lima	Team
Silver medal – second place	2015 Toronto	Team
Silver medal – second place	2023 Santiago	Team

Rosalie Lalonde (born March 27, 1997) is a Canadian 3.0 point wheelchair basketball player who won a silver medal at the 2015 Parapan American Games in Toronto. In 2016, she was selected as part of the team for the 2016 Summer Paralympics in Rio de Janeiro

== Biography ==
Rosalie Lalonde was born in Montreal, Quebec, on March 27, 1997. From ages 0–18, she lived in Saint-Clet, Quebec. A 3.0 point player, she began playing wheelchair basketball in 2011. Initially a reluctant player, she began playing locally, then for the Quebec provincial junior team, and then for the senior provincial women's team. In 2013, she played for the national side in the U21 3-on-3 women's wheelchair basketball at the Youth Parapan American Games in Buenos Aires, Argentina, winning silver.

In 2015, she joined the U25 national women's team, which played in the 2015 Women's U25 Wheelchair Basketball World Championship in Beijing, China in June and July 2015, and then made her debut with the senior team for the 2015 Parapan American Games in Toronto, winning silver.

In May 2016, she won a scholarship to the University of Alabama, where she played for its Crimson Tide Wheelchair basketball team, and study Human Development and Family Studies. In her first season she won the National College Championship with the Crimson Tide. After a tough loss in the final against UTA in her second year, she took home the title in her junior year 2019. To top it off, in April 2016 her Quebec team, Les Gladiateurs de Laval won the Canadian Wheelchair Basketball National League (CNWBL) Women's National Championship in Longueuil, Quebec, defeating Edmonton Inferno 60–56. In June 2016, she was named as part of the senior national side for the 2016 Summer Paralympics in Rio de Janeiro. At 19, she was the youngest player on the team.

== Awards ==
- 2019 - Collegiate National Champion
- 2017 - Collegiate National Champion
- 2016 – Wheelchair Basketball Canada Junior Athlete of the Year
- 2015 – Silver at 2015 Parapan American Games (Toronto, Ontario)
- 2015 – Gold at Canada Games with Team Quebec (Prince George, British Columbia)
- 2013 – Silver place at Youth Parapan American Games in the U21 3-on-3 women's wheelchair basketball (Buenos Aires, Argentina)
