= Wheelchair basketball at the 2020 Summer Paralympics – Women's tournament =

Wheelchair basketball at the XVI Paralympic Games
- Venue: Ariake Arena; Musashino Forest Sport Plaza
- Dates: 25 August – 4 September 2021
- Competitors: 120 from 10 nations

Medalists
1st place, gold medalist(s)		Netherlands
2nd place, silver medalist(s)		China
3rd place, bronze medalist(s)		United States

The 2020 Summer Paralympics women's tournament in Tokyo began on 25 August and ended on the 4 September 2021. The matches were played at the Musashino Forest Sport Plaza and the Ariake Arena. This was the fourteenth edition of the tournament since the tournament debut at the 1968 Summer Paralympics in Tel Aviv.

Ten teams were separated into two groups of five with the top four qualifying through to the knockout stage of the competition. The knockout stage started from the quarter-finals and ended with the gold medal match, aside from the classification matches.

== Competition schedule ==
G	Group stage	¼	Quarter-finals	½	Semi-finals	B	Bronze medal match	GM	Gold medal match

Date Event	Wed 25 Aug	Thu 26 Aug	Fri 27 Aug	Sat 28 Aug	Sun 29 Aug	Mon 30 Aug	Tue 31 Aug	Wed 1 Sep	Thu 2 Sep	Fri 3 Sep	Sat 4 Sep	
Women	G	G	G	G	G		1/4		1/2		B	GM

== Qualification ==
Ten teams qualified through the qualifying stage with the host nation in Japan. The other nine spots were spread out across four different events. Four spots was taken up by European teams, two by the Americas and Asia/Pacific and one in Africa.

Means of qualification	Date	Venue	Berths	Qualified
Host country	—N/a	—N/a	1	Japan
2019 Europe Zonal Championships	29 June – 7 July 2019	(Netherlands) Rotterdam	4	Netherlands; Great Britain; Germany; Spain
2019 Parapan American Games	23 August – 1 September 2019	(Peru) Lima	2	Canada; United States
2019 Asia/Oceania Zonal Championships	29 November – 7 December 2019	(Thailand) Pattaya	2	Australia; China
2020 African Zonal Championships	1–7 March 2020	(South Africa) Johannesburg	1	Algeria
Total			10	

== Preliminary round ==
=== Group A ===
Pos	Team	Pld	W	L	PF	PA	PD	Pts	Qualification
1	Germany	4	4	0	248	204	+44	8	Quarter-finals
2	Canada	4	3	1	267	185	+82	7	Quarter-finals
3	Japan (H)	4	2	2	216	215	+1	6	Quarter-finals
4	Great Britain	4	1	3	212	218	−6	5	Quarter-finals
5	Australia	4	0	4	180	301	−121	4	9th/10th place playoff

Source: TOCOG
Rules for classification: 1) Points; 2) Head-to-head results; 3) Points difference; 4) Points scored.
(H) Hosts

25 August 2021
14:45

Report

Great Britain	54–73	Canada
Scoring by quarter: 14–11, 15–15, 10–19, 15–28
Pts: Thompson 11; Rebs: Love 7 Asts: Freeman 7		Pts: Dandeneau 32; Rebs: Dandeneau 20; Asts: Dandeneau 11

Musashino Forest Sport Plaza
Referees: Darrell Hargreaves

25 August 2021
17:00

Report

Australia	47–73	Japan
Scoring by quarter: 14–16, 14–18, 11–18, 8–21
Pts: Merritt 18; Rebs: Merritt 19; Asts: Merritt 4		Pts: Kitada 16; Rebs: Amimoto 11; Asts: Amimoto 11

Musashino Forest Sport Plaza
Referees: Celine Villard

26 August 2021
9:00

Report

Germany	77–58	Australia
Scoring by quarter: 24–13, 21–12, 7–14, 25–19
Pts: Miller 30; Rebs: Miller 11; Asts: Lang, Miller 8		Pts: Merritt 27; Rebs: Merritt 10; Asts: Merritt 6

Musashino Forest Sport Plaza
Attendance: 360
Referees: Hsieh Shu-fei

26 August 2021
11:15

Report

Japan	54–48	Great Britain
Scoring by quarter: 12–12, 13–9, 16–8, 13–19
Pts: Fujii 14; Rebs: Fujii 10; Asts: Amimoto 6		Pts: Freeman 14; Rebs: Freeman 7 Asts: Freeman, Williams 5

Musashino Forest Sport Plaza
Attendance: 360
Referees: Carsten Rehling

27 August 2021
9:00

Report

Canada	61–35	Japan
Scoring by quarter: 13–8, 18–6, 20–11, 10–10
Pts: Dandeneau 19; Rebs: Ouellet, Young 10; Asts: Young 6		Pts: Fujii 10; Rebs: Amimoto 8 Asts: Amimoto 5

Ariake Arena
Referees: Hsieh Shu-fei

27 August 2021
20:30

Report

Great Britain	35–53	Germany
Scoring by quarter: 7–18, 10–12, 4–8, 14–15
Pts: Love 8 Rebs: Love 8 Asts: Freeman 6		Pts: Miller 21; Rebs: Miller 18; Asts: Lang 9

Musashino Forest Sport Plaza
Referees: Shunsuke Nikaido

28 August 2021
17:00

Report

Germany	59–57	Canada
Scoring by quarter: 19–12, 14–11, 15–15, 11–19
Pts: Miller 19; Rebs: Miller 15; Asts: Miller 8		Pts: Dandeneau 23; Rebs: Dandeneau 9 Asts: Young 6

Ariake Arena
Referees: Helen Rosenberg

28 August 2021
20:30

Report

Australia	38–75	Great Britain
Scoring by quarter: 6–20, 12–20, 12–23, 8–12
Pts: Munro-Cook 16; Rebs: Merritt 10; Asts: Merritt, Munro-Cook 3		Pts: Williams 18; Rebs: Freeman 10; Asts: Freeman 10

Ariake Arena
Referees: Matias Quintana

29 August 2021
11:15

Report

Japan	54–59	Germany
Scoring by quarter: 12–9, 14–13, 16–15, 12–22
Pts: Fujii 16; Rebs: Amimoto 8 Asts: Amimoto, Hagino 4		Pts: Lang 27; Rebs: Lang 17; Asts: Lang 8

Ariake Arena
Referees: Gustavo Mathias

29 August 2021
20:30

Report

Canada	76–37	Australia
Scoring by quarter: 20–11, 19–14, 19–8, 18–4
Pts: Steeves 17; Rebs: Dandeneau 8 Asts: Dandeneau 6		Pts: Merrit 21; Rebs: Merritt 6 Asts: Merritt 6

Musashino Forest Sport Plaza
Attendance: 0
Referees: Juan Urunuela

=== Group B ===
Pos	Team	Pld	W	L	PF	PA	PD	Pts	Qualification
1	China	4	4	0	207	133	+74	8	Quarter-finals
2	Netherlands	4	3	1	278	145	+133	7	Quarter-finals
3	United States	4	2	2	229	165	+64	6	Quarter-finals
4	Spain	4	1	3	167	185	−18	5	Quarter-finals
5	Algeria	4	0	4	72	325	−253	4	9th/10th place playoff

Source: TOCOG
Rules for classification: 1) Points; 2) Head-to-head results; 3) Points difference; 4) Points scored.

25 August 2021
9:00

Report

Algeria	25–74	China
Scoring by quarter: 13–19, 6–23, 2–24, 4–8
Pts: Khemgani 13; Rebs: Zairi 7 Asts: Abdelali 3		Pts: Zhang X. 20; Rebs: Lyu 6 Asts: Lin 10

Musashino Forest Sport Plaza
Referees: Alexandre Lapoint

25 August 2021
11:15

Report

Netherlands	68–58	United States
Scoring by quarter: 14–16, 20–20, 16–16, 18–6
Pts: Beijer 28; Rebs: Beijer 12; Asts: Visser 12		Pts: Zurbrugg 20; Rebs: Hollermann, Schneider 9 Asts: Ryan 12

Musashino Forest Sport Plaza
Referees: Juan Urunuela

26 August 2021
17:00

Report

United States	68–34	Spain
Scoring by quarter: 18–11, 14–9, 21–11, 15–3
Pts: Hollermann 20; Rebs: Hollermann 11; Asts: Hollermann 8		Pts: Lopez 11; Rebs: Lopez 8 Asts: Lopez 3

Ariake Arena
Referees: Maurizio Zamponi

26 August 2021
20:30

Report

China	45–38	Netherlands
Scoring by quarter: 10–9, 8–15, 8–0, 19–14
Pts: Lin 17; Rebs: Zhang X. 15; Asts: Lin, Zhang X. 4		Pts: Korver 12; Rebs: Beijer 7 Asts: Korver 4

Ariake Arena
Referees: Helen Rosenberg

27 August 2021
11:15

Report

Netherlands	109–18	Algeria
Scoring by quarter: 23–0, 34–12, 22–6, 30–0
Pts: Beijer 33; Rebs: Beijer 11; Asts: Kramer 11		Pts: Khemgani 7 Rebs: Khemgani 6 Asts: Khedir, Khemgani 2

Ariake Arena
Referees: Hiroki Ono

27 August 2021
17:00

Report

Spain	29–46	China
Scoring by quarter: 6–16, 10–8, 7–12, 6–10
Pts: Alonso 9 Rebs: Montiel 8 Asts: Zudaire 4		Pts: Lin, Huang 11; Rebs: Zhang X. 9 Asts: Lin 5

Musashino Forest Sport Plaza
Attendance: 8
Referees: Geghard Tahmasian

28 August 2021
9:00

Report

United States	41–42	China
Scoring by quarter: 12–2, 9–5, 6–14, 14–21
Pts: Zurbrugg 15; Rebs: Ryan 9 Asts: Hollermann 7		Pts: Zhang X. 15; Rebs: Dai 10; Asts: Lin 7

Musashino Forest Sport Plaza
Attendance: 830
Referees: Hsieh Shu-fei

28 August 2021
11:15

Report

Algeria	8–80	Spain
Scoring by quarter: 4–24, 0–23, 4–17, 0–16
Pts: Boublal 4 Rebs: Khemgani 6 Asts: Khemgani 3		Pts: Alonso 20; Rebs: Alonso, Perez 10; Asts: Zudaire 9

Musashino Forest Sport Plaza
Referees: Sebastien Gauthier

29 August 2021
9:00

Report

Spain	24–63	Netherlands
Scoring by quarter: 7–23, 4–10, 11–18, 2–12
Pts: Perez 5 Rebs: Lopez 7 Asts: six players 1		Pts: Beijer 22; Rebs: Beijer, Kramer 9 Asts: Beijer 5

Ariake Arena
Referees: Yap Poh Boon

29 August 2021
17:00

Report

Algeria	21–62	United States
Scoring by quarter: 0–18, 5–14, 9–18, 7–12
Pts: Boublal 10; Rebs: Abdelali 7 Asts: Khemgani 4		Pts: Gonzalez 14; Rebs: Gonzalez 7 Asts: Ryan 7

Musashino Forest Sport Plaza
Attendance: 810
Referees: Geghard Tahmasian

== Knockout stage ==
=== Bracket ===
Quarter-finals
31 August
Germany	57
Spain	33
31 August
Netherlands	82
Japan	24
31 August
Canada	48
United States	63
31 August
China	47
Great Britain	33

Semi-finals
2 September
Germany	42
Netherlands	52
2 September
United States	36
China	41

Gold medal match
4 September
Netherlands	50
China	31
Bronze medal match
4 September
Germany	51
United States	64

=== 9th–10th classification playoff ===
31 August 2021
9:00

Report

Australia	71–32	Algeria
Scoring by quarter: 27–8, 15–9, 17–7, 12–8
Pts: Merritt 27; Rebs: Merritt 8 Asts: Merritt 5		Pts: Boublal 9 Rebs: Boublal, Zairi 6 Asts: Abdelali, Khemgani, Zairi 3

Ariake Arena
Referees: Ben Wood

=== Quarter-finals ===
31 August 2021
12:30

Report

Canada	48–63	United States
Scoring by quarter: 10–12, 13–21, 9–12, 16–18
Pts: Young 11; Rebs: Dandeneau 13; Asts: Dandeneau, Young 6		Pts: Hollermann 19; Rebs: Hollermann, Schneider 9 Asts: Ryan 13

Ariake Arena
Referees: Maurizio Zamponi

31 August 2021
15:00

Report

Germany	57–33	Spain
Scoring by quarter: 16–13, 8–6, 19–5, 14–9
Pts: Lang 14; Rebs: Miller 10; Asts: Lang, Miller 7		Pts: Perez 13; Rebs: Lopez 9 Asts: S. Ruiz 5

Ariake Arena
Referees: Helen Rosenberg

31 August 2021
18:15

Report

China	47–33	Great Britain
Scoring by quarter: 14–5, 13–9, 11–10, 9–9
Pts: Lin 13; Rebs: Lyu 14; Asts: Lin 10		Pts: Freeman 10; Rebs: Freeman 10; Asts: Love 3

Ariake Arena
Referees: Adam Fronczak

31 August 2021
20:45

Report

Netherlands	82–24	Japan
Scoring by quarter: 28–6, 18–6, 20–8, 16–4
Pts: Beijer 38; Rebs: Kramer 17; Asts: Kramer 9		Pts: four players 4 Rebs: Kitada 6 Asts: Amimoto 4

Ariake Arena
Referees: Sebastien Gauthier

=== 7th–8th classification playoff ===
2 September 2021
15:00

Report

Spain	43–62	Great Britain
Scoring by quarter: 8–22, 13–11, 8–20, 14–9
Pts: Lopez 13; Rebs: Perez 9 Asts: Zudaire 4		Pts: Conroy 22; Rebs: Freeman 6 Asts: Freeman 9

Ariake Arena
Referees: Yap Poh Boon

=== 5th–6th classification playoff ===
3 September 2021
15:00

Report

Canada	68–49	Japan
Scoring by quarter: 22–4, 16–13, 19–14, 11–18
Pts: Lalonde 20; Rebs: Young 13; Asts: Young 8		Pts: Kitada 20; Rebs: Kitada 8 Asts: Fujii 7

Ariake Arena
Referees: Geghard Tahmasian

=== Semi-finals ===
2 September 2021
18:15

Report

Germany	42–52	Netherlands
Scoring by quarter: 12–16, 13–10, 11–9, 6–17
Pts: Lang 18; Rebs: Lang 8 Asts: Lang 5		Pts: Beijer 30; Rebs: Beijer 19; Asts: Visser 6

Ariake Arena
Attendance: 279
Referees: Sebastien Gauthier

2 September 2021
20:45

Report

United States	36–41	China
Scoring by quarter: 9–6, 6–14, 8–7, 13–14
Pts: Hollermann 13; Rebs: Schneider 10; Asts: Hollermann, Ryan 5		Pts: Zhang T. 13; Rebs: Lin, Lyu 8 Asts: Lin 5

Ariake Arena
Attendance: 279
Referees: Tomas Pajer

=== Bronze medal match ===
4 September 2021
17:45

Report

Germany	51–64	United States (bronze)
Scoring by quarter: 13–20, 12–11, 14–13, 12–20
Pts: Miller 26; Rebs: Lang 11; Asts: Miller 8		Pts: Zurbrugg 22; Rebs: Hollermann 12; Asts: Hollermann 10

Ariake Arena
Attendance: 30
Referees: Shunsuke Nikaido

=== Gold medal match ===
4 September 2021
20:30

Report

(gold) Netherlands	50–31	China (silver)
Scoring by quarter: 9–12, 12–2, 12–6, 17–11
Pts: Kramer 15; Rebs: Kramer 9 Asts: Kramer, Visser 5		Pts: Lin 9 Rebs: Zhang X. 11; Asts: Zhang T. 5

Ariake Arena
Attendance: 30
Referees: Linas Radykas

== Rankings ==
Rank	Team
1st place, gold medalist(s)	Netherlands
2nd place, silver medalist(s)	China
3rd place, bronze medalist(s)	United States
4	Germany
5	Canada
6	Japan
7	Great Britain
8	Spain
9	Australia
10	Algeria
