= Jitske Visser =

Dutch wheelchair basketball player

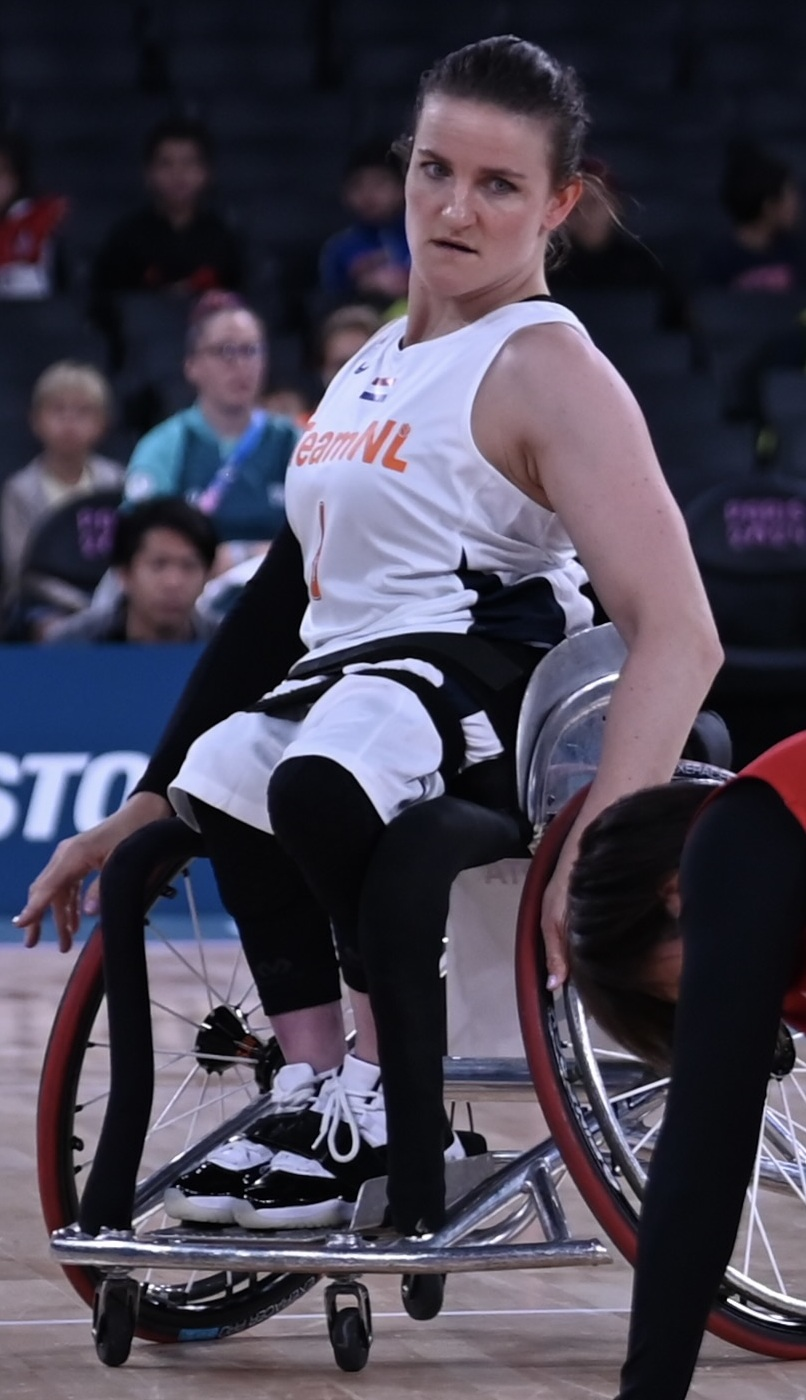
- Visser at the 2024 Summer Paralympics

Personal information
- Born: 29 October 1992 (age 33) Zwolle, Netherlands

Sport
- Country: Netherlands
- Sport: Wheelchair basketball
- Disability class: 1.0
Medal record
Women's wheelchair basketball
Representing the Netherlands
Paralympic Games
Gold medal – first place	2020 Tokyo	Team
Gold medal – first place	2024 Paris	Team
Bronze medal – third place	2012 London	Team
Bronze medal – third place	2016 Rio de Janeiro	Team
World Championship
Gold medal – first place	2018 Hamburg	Team
Gold medal – first place	2022 Dubai	Team
Bronze medal – third place	2014 Toronto	Team
Bronze medal – third place	2026 Ottawa	Team

Jitske Visser (born 29 October 1992) is a Dutch wheelchair basketball player.

== Career ==
Visser has represented the Netherlands at five Summer Paralympic Games, winning gold medals in wheelchair basketball in 2020 and 2024 and bronze medals in 2012 and 2016.

In 2021, Visser was elected chairperson of the International Paralympic Committee's athlete council.
