= Wheelchair basketball at the 2024 Summer Paralympics – Women's tournament =

2024 Summer Paralympics events

Wheelchair basketball at the XVII Paralympic Games
- Venue: Bercy Arena
- Dates: 29 August – 8 September 2024
- Competitors: 96 from 8 nations

Medalists
1st place, gold medalist(s)		Netherlands
2nd place, silver medalist(s)		United States
3rd place, bronze medalist(s)		China

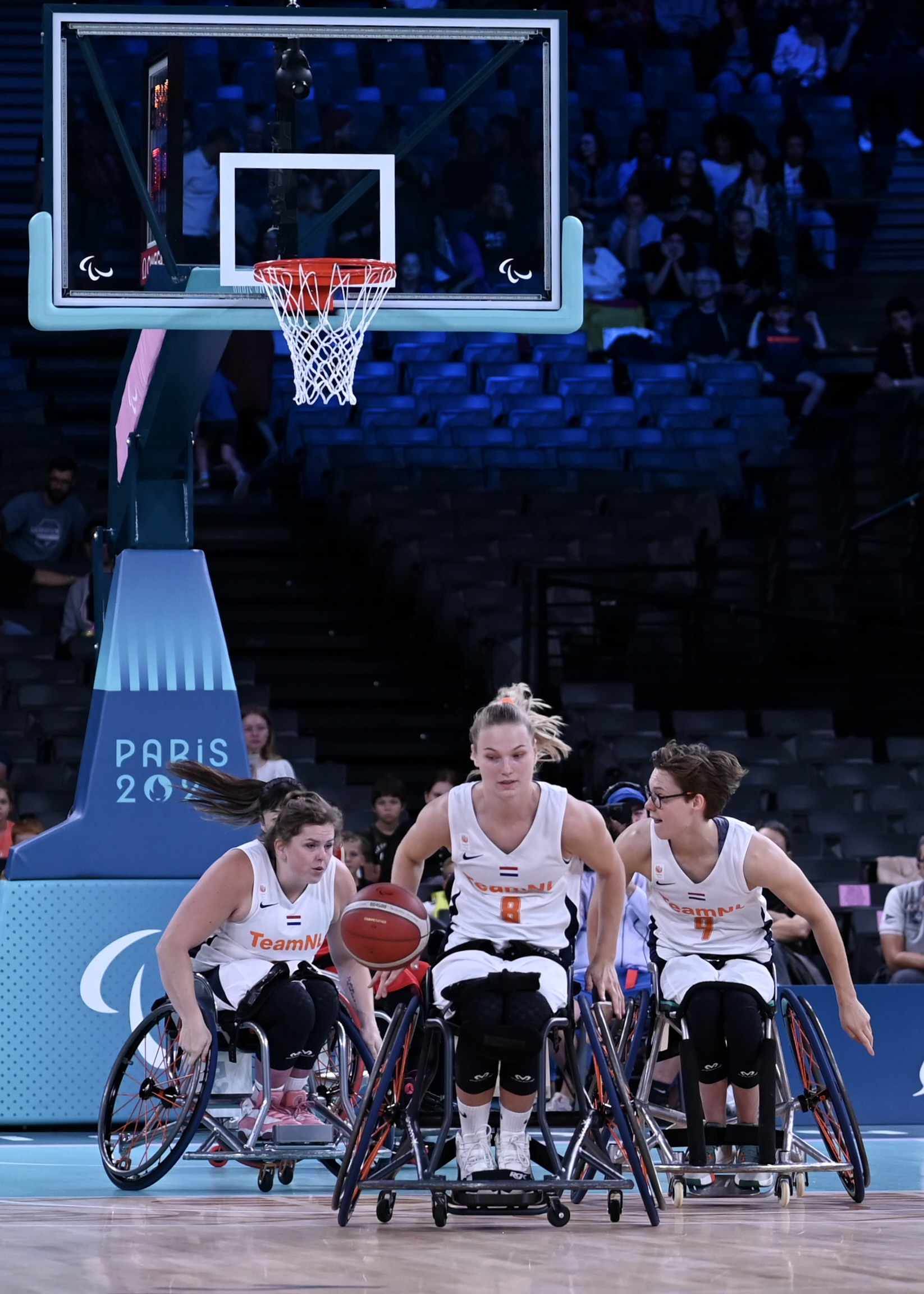
Dutch players Lindsay Frelink, Julia van der Sprong and Bo Kramer.

The 2024 Summer Paralympics women's tournament in Paris began on 29 August and ended on 8 September 2024. The matches were played at the Bercy Arena. This was the fifteenth edition of the tournament since the tournament debut at the 1968 Summer Paralympics in Tel Aviv.

Eight teams were divided into two groups of four to determine the ranking for matches in the knockout stage of the competition. From there the tournament had a knockout format which eventually led to the gold medal match.

== Competition schedule ==
G	Group stage	¼	Quarter-finals	½	Semi-finals	B	Bronze medal match	GM	Gold medal match

Date Event	Thu 29 Aug	Fri 30 Aug	Sat 31 Aug	Sun 1 Sep	Mon 2 Sep	Tue 3 Sep	Wed 4 Sep	Thu 5 Sep	Fri 6 Sep	Sat 7 Sep	Sun 8 Sep	
Women	G	G	G	G	G		1/4		1/2		B	GM

== Qualification ==
The top four nations earn sports for their Zones, the winners of the zonal championships will qualify for the Paralympics. Teams are invited to the repechage tournament if the team hasn't earned a quota based on their zonal place rankings via the World Championships. The host nation and the repechage host are also invited to this tournament if they haven't already qualified.

Means of qualification	Date	Venue	Berths	Qualified
2023 European Para Championships	8–20 August 2023	(Netherlands) Rotterdam	2	Great Britain; Netherlands
2023 Parapan American Games	17–26 November 2023	(Chile) Santiago	1	United States
2024 IWBF Asia-Oceania Championships	12–20 January 2024	(Thailand) Bangkok	1	China
2024 IWBF Women's Repechage	17–20 April 2024	(Japan) Osaka	4	Germany; Japan; Spain; Canada
Total			8	

== Preliminary round ==
=== Group A ===
Pos	Team	Pld	W	L	PF	PA	PD	Pts	
1	China	3	3	0	196	150	+46	6	Quarter-finals
2	Canada	3	2	1	209	173	+36	5	Quarter-finals
3	Great Britain	3	1	2	170	159	+11	4	Quarter-finals
4	Spain	3	0	3	121	214	−93	3	Quarter-finals

Source: Paris 2024
Rules for classification: 1) Points; 2) Head-to-head results; 3) Points difference; 4) Points scored.

29 August 2024
12:45

Report

Spain	34–69	Great Britain
Scoring by quarter: 9–20, 8–17, 8–15, 9–17
Pts: Zudaire 12; Rebs: Zudaire 6 Asts: Zudaire 6		Pts: Atkin 19; Rebs: Love 19; Asts: Haizelden 13

Bercy Arena, Paris
Attendance: 12.799
Referees: Gustavo Mathias

29 August 2024
18:15

Report

Canada	65–70	China
Scoring by quarter: 15–19, 18–18, 22–16, 10–17
Pts: Dandeneau 28; Rebs: Dandeneau 9 Asts: Dandeneau 7		Pts: X. Zhang 30; Rebs: X. Zhang 7 Asts: T. Zhang 12

Bercy Arena, Paris
Attendance: 12.682
Referees: Celine Villard

30 August 2024
21:30

Report

China	64–38	Spain
Scoring by quarter: 25–7, 14–12, 7–15, 18–4
Pts: T. Zhang 18; Rebs: Lyu, Huang 4 Asts: Lin 9		Pts: Zudaire 12; Rebs: Zudaire 8 Asts: Zudaire 7

Bercy Arena, Paris
Attendance: 9.265
Referees: Shunsuke Nikaido

31 August 2024
10:30

Report

Great Britain	54–63	Canada
Scoring by quarter: 13–10, 11–19, 12–22, 18–12
Pts: Conroy 15; Rebs: Williams, Love 9 Asts: Haizelden 9		Pts: Young 26; Rebs: Young 12; Asts: Young 8

Bercy Arena, Paris
Attendance: 12.761
Referees: Adam Fronczak

1 September 2024
16:00

Report

Great Britain	42–67	China
Scoring by quarter: 9–16, 13–18, 9–11, 16–17
Pts: Love 15; Rebs: Love 6 Asts: Williams 5		Pts: T. Zhang 16; Rebs: X. Zhang 10; Asts: Lin 10

Bercy Arena, Paris
Attendance: 12.725
Referees: Blaine Krapljanov

1 September 2024
21:30

Report

Spain	49–81	Canada
Scoring by quarter: 14–21, 12–20, 10–18, 13–22
Pts: López 12; Rebs: Zudaire 6 Asts: Ruiz 11		Pts: Dandeneau 36; Rebs: Dandeneau 12; Asts: Dandeneau 12

Bercy Arena, Paris
Attendance: 7.329
Referees: Celine Villard

=== Group B ===
Pos	Team	Pld	W	L	PF	PA	PD	Pts	Qualification
1	Netherlands	3	3	0	224	138	+86	6	Quarter-finals
2	United States	3	2	1	191	165	+26	5	Quarter-finals
3	Germany	3	1	2	159	196	−37	4	Quarter-finals
4	Japan	3	0	3	141	216	−75	3	Quarter-finals

Source: Paris 2024
Rules for classification: 1) Points; 2) Head-to-head results; 3) Points difference; 4) Points scored.

30 August 2024
10:30

Report

Netherlands	87–34	Japan
Scoring by quarter: 29–7, 22–9, 12–4, 24–14
Pts: Beijer 28; Rebs: Kramer 12; Asts: Kramer 9		Pts: Tsuchida 14; Rebs: Kitada 11; Asts: Amimoto 8

Bercy Arena, Paris
Referees: Milutin Jelenić

30 August 2024
16:00

Report

Germany	44–73	United States
Scoring by quarter: 10-16, 10-25, 8-16, 16-16
Pts: Miller 21; Rebs: Passiwan 10; Asts: Miller 8		Pts: Ryan 17; Rebs: Murray, Hollermann 6 Asts: Murray 12

Bercy Arena, Paris
Attendance: 12.726
Referees: Fengqin Wang

31 August 2024
18:15

Report

Netherlands	69–56	United States
Scoring by quarter: 15–16, 17–12, 18–12, 19–16
Pts: Beijer 34; Rebs: Beijer 12; Asts: Kramer 8		Pts: Hollermann 21; Rebs: González 10; Asts: Zurbrugg 9

Bercy Arena, Paris
Attendance: 12.741
Referees: Sebastien Gauthier

1 September 2024
12:45

Report

Japan	55–67	Germany
Scoring by quarter: 15–16, 10–19, 21–14, 9–18
Pts: Kitada 22; Rebs: Kitada 14; Asts: Yanagimoto, Amimoto 6		Pts: Miller 39; Rebs: Miller 18; Asts: Miller 8

Bercy Arena, Paris
Attendance: 12.679
Referees: Geghard Tahmasian

2 September 2024
13:45

Report

United States	62–52	Japan
Scoring by quarter: 22–12, 12–11, 18–13, 10–16
Pts: Ryan 16; Rebs: Zurbrugg 7 Asts: Murray, Zurbrugg 8		Pts: Kitada 16; Rebs: Amimoto 12; Asts: Amimoto 7

Bercy Arena, Paris
Attendance: 8.891
Referees: Linas Radykas

2 September 2024
21:30

Report

Germany	48–68	Netherlands
Scoring by quarter: 12–17, 7–17, 12–16, 17–18
Pts: Miller 17; Rebs: Miller 12; Asts: Miller 11		Pts: Beijer, Kramer 19; Rebs: Beijer 13; Asts: Van der Sprong 6

Bercy Arena, Paris
Attendance: 12.721
Referees: Gustavo Mathias

== Knockout stage ==
Quarter-finals
4 September - 12:45
China	62
Japan	50
4 September - 16:00
United States	59
Great Britain	52
4 September - 21:30
Canada	71
Germany	53
4 September - 18:15
Netherlands	61
Spain	43

Semi-finals
6 September - 16:00
China	47
United States	50
6 September - 21:30
Canada	61
Netherlands	72

Gold medal match
8 September - 13:45
United States	49
Netherlands	63
Bronze medal match
8 September - 10:30
China	65
Canada	43

=== Quarter-finals ===
4 September 2024
12:45

Report

China	62–50	Japan
Scoring by quarter: 22-6, 14-15, 14-11, 12-18
Pts: X. Zhang 16; Rebs: Chen 5 Asts: Lin 8		Pts: Amimoto 15; Rebs: Amimoto 13; Asts: Amimoto 6

Bercy Arena, Paris
Attendance: 11,430
Referees: Erik Etzelmueller

4 September 2024
16:00

Report

United States	59–52	Great Britain
Scoring by quarter: 12-12, 19-12, 13-17, 15-11
Pts: Gonzalez 16; Rebs: Hollermann 13; Asts: Zurbrugg, Ryan 6		Pts: Atkin 15; Rebs: Love 18; Asts: Love 9

Bercy Arena, Paris
Attendance: 12,550
Referees: Blaine Krapljanov

4 September 2024
18:15

Report

Netherlands	61–43	Spain
Scoring by quarter: 17-13, 11-12, 15-11, 18-7
Pts: Beijer 34; Rebs: van der Sprong 13; Asts: Kramer 5		Pts: Pérez 18; Rebs: Pérez 8 Asts: Zudaire 7

Bercy Arena, Paris
Attendance: 12,550
Referees: Fengqin Wang

4 September 2024
21:30

Report

Canada	71–53	Germany
Scoring by quarter: 17–12, 17–10, 17–14, 20–17
Pts: Dandeneau 33; Rebs: Dandeneau 16; Asts: Young 7		Pts: Miller 18; Rebs: Miller 8 Asts: Miller 14

Bercy Arena, Paris
Attendance: 12.518
Referees: Shunsuke Nikaido

=== Classification matches ===
Classification qualifying

5 September 2024
10:30

Report

Great Britain	67–55	Japan
Scoring by quarter: 15–13, 14–17, 20–12, 18–13
Pts: Love 17; Rebs: Love 14; Asts: Love 8		Pts: Amimoto 19; Rebs: Amimoto 13; Asts: Yanagimoto 10

Bercy Arena, Paris
Attendance: 8.704
Referees: Sébastien Gauthier

5 September 2024
12:45

Report

Germany	51–45	Spain
Scoring by quarter: 12–9, 14–15, 19–10, 6–11
Pts: Miller 23; Rebs: Passiwan 12; Asts: Miller 7		Pts: Zudaire, Pérez 14; Rebs: Pérez 8 Asts: Zudaire, Ruiz 6

Bercy Arena, Paris
Attendance: 8.704
Referees: Darrell Hagreaves

7th–8th classification match

7 September 2024
13:45

Report

Japan	72–55	Spain
Scoring by quarter: 20–13, 18–13, 12–18, 22–11
Pts: Amimoto 22; Rebs: Amimoto 8 Asts: Amimoto, Yanagimoto 7		Pts: Pérez 15; Rebs: Pérez 10; Asts: Zudaire 10

Bercy Arena, Paris
Attendance: 12.419
Referees: Cristian Colombatti

5th–6th classification match

7 September 2024
19:15

Report

Great Britain	48–31	Germany
Scoring by quarter: 11–8, 9–6, 11–16, 17–9
Pts: Love 12; Rebs: Love 12; Asts: Love 7		Pts: Miller 13; Rebs: Miller, Passiwan 8 Asts: Miller 6

Bercy Arena, Paris
Attendance: 12,611
Referees: Adam Fronczak

=== Semi-finals ===
6 September 2024
16:00

Report

China	47–50	United States
Scoring by quarter: 14–12, 12–11, 10–17, 11–10
Pts: Lin 15; Rebs: X. Zhang, Lyu 8 Asts: Lin 10		Pts: Hollermann 20; Rebs: Murray 9 Asts: Hollermann, Zurbrugg 6

Bercy Arena, Paris
Attendance: 12.527
Referees: Drazen Strok

6 September 2024
21:30

Report

Netherlands	72–61	Canada
Scoring by quarter: 16-12, 17-23, 20-14, 19-12
Pts: Kramer 25; Rebs: Beijer 12; Asts: Kramer 9		Pts: Young 29; Rebs: Dandeneau 13; Asts: Dandeneau 10

Bercy Arena, Paris
Attendance: 12.514
Referees: Shunsuke Nikaido

=== Bronze medal match ===
8 September 2024
10:30

Report

China	65–43	Canada
Scoring by quarter: 19–11, 16–6, 16–8, 14–18
Pts: T. Zhang 16; Rebs: X. Zhang 7 Asts: Lin 12		Pts: Young 12; Rebs: Dandeneau 9 Asts: Dandeneau, Young 5

Bercy Arena, Paris
Attendance: 12.576
Referees: Yekta Koç

=== Gold medal match ===
8 September 2024
13:45

Report

Netherlands	63–49	United States
Scoring by quarter: 8–12, 23–12, 17–13, 15–12
Pts: Kramer 23; Rebs: Kramer 12; Asts: De Rooij 7		Pts: Hollermann 17; Rebs: Hollermann 8 Asts: Zurbrugg 7

Bercy Arena, Paris
Attendance: 12.629
Referees: Céline Villard

== Rankings ==
Rank	Team
1st place, gold medalist(s)	Netherlands
2nd place, silver medalist(s)	United States
3rd place, bronze medalist(s)	China
4	Canada
5	Great Britain
6	Germany
7	Japan
8	Spain
