= 2022 Wheelchair Basketball World Championships =

Wheelchair basketball tournament in Dubai

2022 Wheelchair Basketball World Championship
- Venue: Dubai World Trade Centre
- Location: Dubai, United Arab Emirates
- Start date: 9 June 2023
- End date: 20 June 2023
- Competitors: 16 teams (men); 12 teams (women); from 20 nations

Dubai World Trade Centre entrance. Competitions were held in the building on the left.

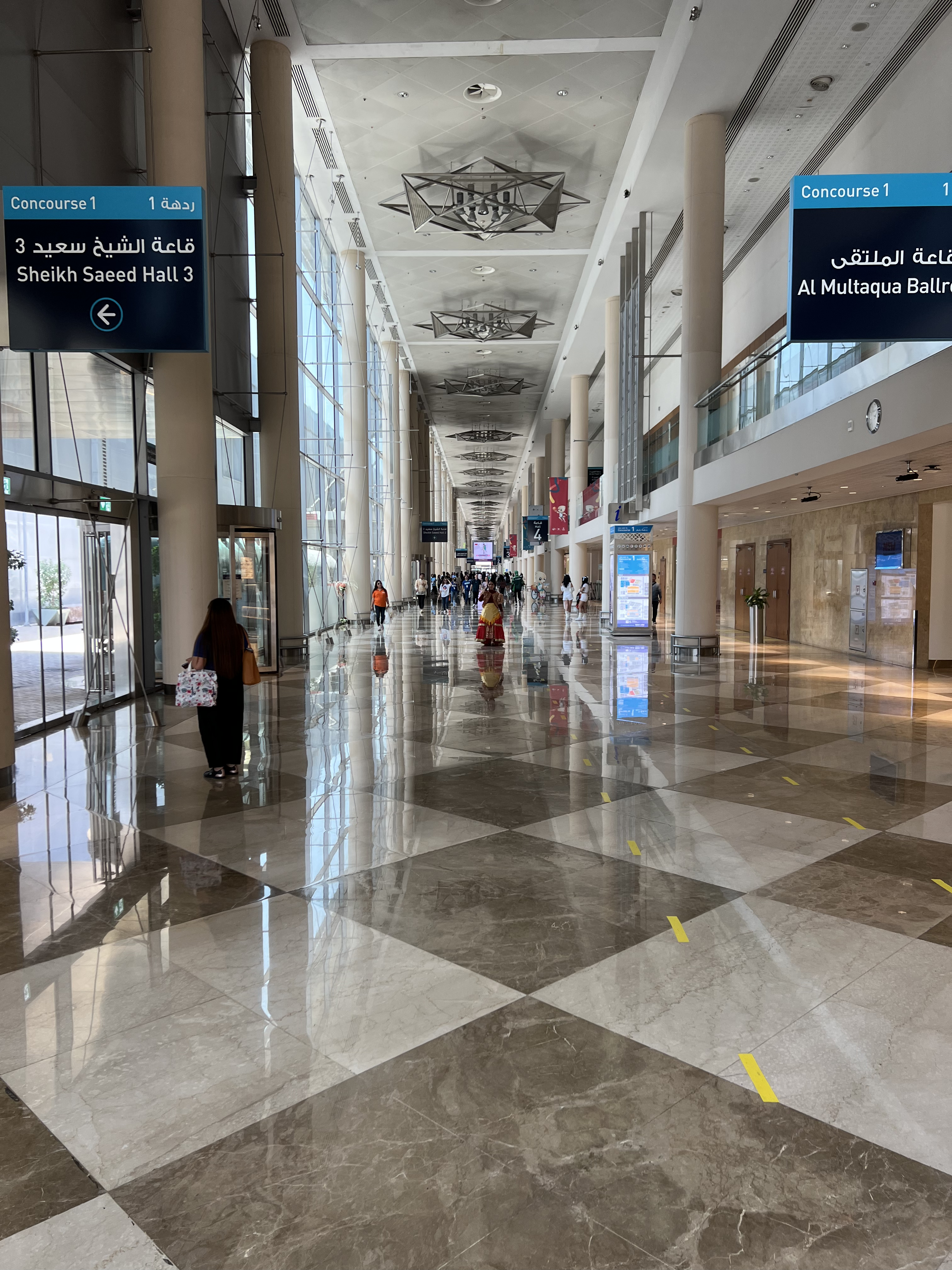
Dubai World Trade Centre interior. Competitions were held in the halls off the corridor on the right.

The 2022 Wheelchair Basketball World Championships were held at the Dubai World Trade Centre in Dubai, United Arab Emirates, from 8 to 20 June 2023. Both men's and women's tournaments were played, with 12 women's and 16 men's teams competing, representing 20 different nations. Each team selected 12 players for the tournament. The men's competition was won by the United States, with Great Britain winning silver and Iran winning bronze. The women's competition was won by the Netherlands, with China winning silver and the United States winning bronze.

== Event ==
The event was held at the Dubai World Trade Centre in Dubai in the United Arab Emirates 8 to 20 June 2023. Originally scheduled to be held in November 2022, it was postponed to June 2023 in order not to clash with the 2022 FIFA World Cup being held in Qatar, but the name of the event was not changed. The opening ceremony was presided over by His Highness Sheikh Mansoor bin Mohammed bin Rashid Al Maktoum, the chairman of the Dubai Sports Council, and Ulf Mehrens, the president of the International Wheelchair Basketball Federation.

== Medallists ==
Event	Gold	Silver	Bronze
Men's team	United States	Great Britain	Iran
Women's team	Netherlands	China	United States

== Qualification ==
Qualification was based on standings at the Tokyo 2020 Paralympic Games. Each Olympic zone had one place, and in both competitions one place was allocated to the United Arab Emirates as the host nation. Additional places were earned by standings at Tokyo, not for the team, but for their zone. For the men, this resulted in one place for Africa, four for the Americas, six for Asia Oceania and five for Europe. For the women, one place for Africa, three for the Americas, four for Asia Oceania and four for Europe.

Qualification tournaments for the 2022 World Championships took place in all four Zones:

- For Europe, in the 2021 European Wheelchair Basketball Championship, where Great Britain, Germany, Netherlands and Spain qualified in the women's event and France, Germany, Great Britain, Italy, and the Netherlands in the men's.
- For Africa, in the 2022 Africa World Championship Qualifiers, where Algeria qualified in the women's event and Egypt in the men's
- For Asia Oceania, in the 2022 Asia Oceania Championships, where Australia, Japan and Iran qualified in the women's event and Australia, Iran, Korea, Thailand and Iraq in the men's
- For the Americas, in the 2022 Americas Cup, where Canada, the United States and Brazil qualified in the women's event and the United States, Argentina, Canada and Brazil in the men's.

As host nation, the United Arab Emirates qualified in both Men's and Women's events, but was unable to field a women's team, and its place was taken by Thailand. The place of Iran's women's team was taken by China.

== Pools composition ==
=== Women ===
Group A	Group B
Algeria	Brazil
United States	Canada
Thailand	China
Japan	Australia
Germany	Spain
Netherlands	Great Britain

=== Men ===
Group A	Group B	Group C	Group D
Australia	Egypt	Netherlands	United States
Brazil	Germany	Argentina	Great Britain
Italy	Canada	South Korea	Iran
United Arab Emirates (H)	Thailand	France	Iraq

== Squads ==
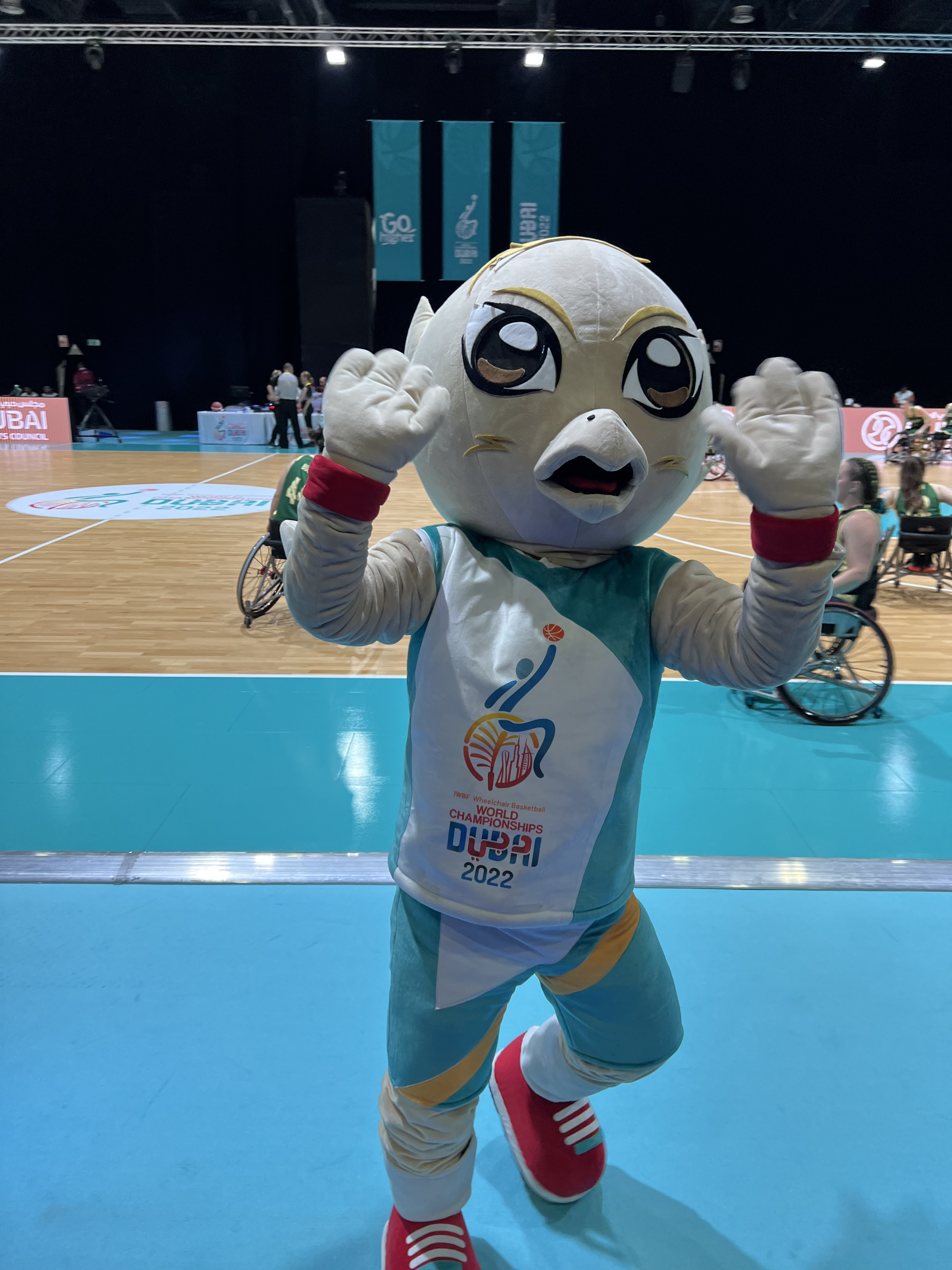
2022 Wheelchair Basketball World Championships mascot

Each of the 16 men's and 12 women's teams (from 20 different nations) selected a squad of 12 players for the tournament. Athletes are given an eight-level-score specific to wheelchair basketball, ranging from 0.5 to 4.5. Lower scores represent a higher degree of disability. The sum score of all players on the court cannot exceed 14.

== Women ==
=== Preliminary round ===
==== Group A ====
Team	Pld	W	L	PF	PA	PD	Pts.
Netherlands	5	5	0	443	178	+265	10
Germany	5	4	1	346	220	+126	9
United States	5	3	2	389	220	+169	8
Japan	5	2	3	273	293	-20	7
Algeria	5	1	4	156	428	-272	6
Thailand	5	0	5	141	409	-268	5

10 June 2023
12:00

Statistics

Algeria	36–70	Japan
Scoring by quarter: 4-24, 14-42, 31-58, 36-70
Pts: D. Khemgani, 17; Rebs: D. Khemgani, 11; Asts: D. Khemgani, 3		Pts: A. Yanagimoto, 20; Rebs: C. Kitada, 6 Asts: M. Amimoto, 7

Dubai WTC Court 2

10 June 2023
16:45

Statistics

Germany	45–60	Netherlands
Scoring by quarter: 12-11, 23-27, 35-46, 45-60
Pts: K. Lang, 19; Rebs: M. Miller, 11; Asts: M. Miller, 6		Pts: B. Kramer, 25; Rebs: M. Beijer, 13; Asts: C. Korver, 4

Dubai WTC Court 1

10 June 2023
16:45

Statistics

Thailand	23–99	United States
Scoring by quarter: 4-27, 12-54, 20-79, 23-99
Pts: N. Ponin, 8 Rebs: P. Putthanoi, 5 Asts: N. Ponin, P. Putthanoi,2		Pts: R. Hollermann, 16; Rebs: N. Schneider, 8 Asts: C. Ryan, 9

Dubai WTC Court 1

11 June 2023
16:30

Statistics

Algeria	23–99	United States
Scoring by quarter: 9-28, 15-45, 21-73, 23-99
Pts: D. Khemgani, 11; Rebs: D. Khemgani, 5		Pts: R. Hollermann, 22; Rebs: N. Schneider, 9 Asts: C. Ryan, 9

Dubai WTC Court 2

11 June 2023
16:45

Statistics

Thailand	30–81	Germany
Scoring by quarter: 9-19, 17-39, 28-63, 30-81
Pts: P. Putthanoi, 11; Rebs: S. Nanthasombat, 6		Pts: M. Miller, 43; Rebs: M. Miller, 12; Asts: L. Bergenthal, 5

Dubai WTC Court 1

12 June 2023
09:45

Statistics

Germany	97–20	Algeria
Scoring by quarter: 32-6, 53-8, 77-14, 97-20
Pts: K. Lang, 31; Rebs: K. Lang, 14; Asts: M. Miller, 8		Pts: D. Khemgani, 9 Rebs: D. Khemgani, 8

Dubai WTC Court 2

12 June 2023
14:15

Statistics

Japan	46–76	United States
Scoring by quarter: 10-18, 22-35, 36-60, 46-76
Pts: A. Yanagimoto, 16; Rebs: M. Amimoto, 14; Asts: M. Amimoto, 9		Pts: R. Hollermann, 28; Rebs: R. Hollermann, 10; Asts: B. Murray, 5

Dubai WTC Court 2

12 June 2023
16:30

Statistics

Netherlands	107–16	Thailand
Scoring by quarter: 28-2, 50-6, 81-12, 107-16
Pts: B. Kramer, 30; Rebs: M. Beijer, 11; Asts: B. Kramer, 8		Pts: N. Ponin, 8

Dubai WTC Court 2

13 June 2023
12:15

Statistics

United States	58–62	Germany
Scoring by quarter: 12-19, 12-35, 27-41, 58-62
Pts: C. Ryan, 13; Rebs: N. Schneider, 8 Asts: L. Zurbrugg, 4		Pts: K. Lang, 27; Rebs: K. Lang, 22; Asts: M. Miller, 9

Dubai WTC Court 1

13 June 2023
14:15

Statistics

Japan	63–24	Thailand
Scoring by quarter: 18-4, 33-9, 49-13, 63-24
Pts: M. Amimoto, 18; Rebs: M. Amimoto, 10; Asts: M. Amimoto, 13		Pts: N. Ponin, 15; Rebs: P. Putthanoi, 15; Asts: P. Putthanoi, 3

Dubai WTC Court 2

13 June 2023
14:30

Statistics

Netherlands	114–18	Algeria
Scoring by quarter: 32-4, 56-8, 86-12, 114-18
Pts: M. Beijer, 32; Rebs: M. Beijer, 14; Asts: B. Kramer, 7		Rebs: M. Foulani, 6

Dubai WTC Court 1

14 June 2023
14:30

Statistics

Netherlands	96–42	Japan
Scoring by quarter: 33-9, 55-17, 78-31, 96-42
Pts: M. Beijer, 31; Rebs: M. Beijer, 10; Asts: B. Kramer, 9		Pts: A. Yanagimoto, 14; Rebs: M. Amimoto, 6 Asts: M. Amimoto, 7

Dubai WTC Court 1

16 June 2023
12:00

Statistics

United States	57–66	Netherlands
Scoring by quarter: 12-17, 25-32, 45-43, 57-66
Pts: R. Hollermann, 18; Rebs: R. Hollermann, 15; Asts: L. Zurbrugg, 5		Pts: M. Beijer, 31; Rebs: B. Kramer, 12; Asts: J. Visser, 7

Dubai WTC Court 2

16 June 2023
16:30

Statistics

Japan	52–61	Germany
Scoring by quarter: 11-16, 26-34, 35-51, 52-61
Pts: K. Lang, 29; Rebs: K. Lang, 10; Asts: K. Lang, 6		Pts: M. Amimoto, 18; Rebs: M. Amimoto, 8 Asts: M. Amimoto, 8

Dubai WTC Court 2

16 June 2023
18:45

Statistics

Algeria	59–48	Thailand
Scoring by quarter: 18-8, 35-22, 49-32, 59-48
Pts: K. Zairi, 24; Rebs: D. Khemgani, 12; Asts: D. Khemgani, 7		Pts: N. Ponin, 22; Rebs: P. Putthanoi, 14; Asts: N. Ponin, 6

Dubai WTC Court 2

==== Group B ====
Team	Pld	W	L	PF	PA	PD	Pts.
China	5	4	1	304	233	+71	9
Spain	5	3	2	276	268	+8	8
Australia	5	3	2	292	301	-9	8
Canada	5	3	2	310	303	+7	8
Great Britain	5	2	3	276	275	+1	7
Brazil	5	0	5	213	291	-78	5

10 June 2023
09:45

Statistics

Brazil	56–61	Canada
Scoring by quarter: 19-18, 34-30, 44-49, 56-61
Pts: P. Assuncao, 16; Rebs: P. Klokler, 12; Asts: S. Oliveria, 4		Pts: K. Dandeneau, 31; Rebs: K. Dandeneau, 17; Asts: C. Ouellet, 9

Dubai WTC Court 2

10 June 2023
10:00

Statistics

China	71–49	Australia
Scoring by quarter: 18-8, 30-23, 51-39, 71-49
Pts: X. Zhang, 22; Rebs: X. Zhang, 20; Asts: S. Lin, 9		Pts: H. Dodd, 20; Rebs: A. Merritt, 7 Asts: G. Inglis, 4

Dubai WTC Court 1

10 June 2023
18:45

Statistics

Spain	48–51	Great Britain
Scoring by quarter: 14-12, 24-21, 42-30, 48-51
Pts: V. Alsonso Vilariño, 12; Rebs: V. Alsonso Vilariño, 10; Asts: B. Zudaire, 9		Pts: H. Freeman, 25; Rebs: H. Freeman, 13; Asts: H. Freeman, 10

Dubai WTC Court 2

11 June 2023
12:15

Statistics

China	66–49	Spain
Scoring by quarter: 16-14, 41-26, 57-34, 66-49
Pts: S. Lin, 22; Rebs: X. Zhang, 15; Asts: S. Lin, 7		Pts: B. Zudaire, 17; Rebs: S. Ruiz, 5 Asts: S. Ruiz, 4

Dubai WTC Court 1

11 June 2023
16:45

Statistics

Great Britain	67–35	Brazil
Scoring by quarter: 16-8, 33-19, 55-29, 67-35
Pts: J. Haizelden, 22; Rebs: H. Freeman, 15; Asts: H. Freeman, 15		Pts: V. Almeida, 14; Rebs: V. Almeida, 9 Asts: V. Almeida, 2

Dubai WTC Court 1

12 June 2023
16:45

Statistics

Great Britain	46–64	China
Scoring by quarter: 8-8, 17-23, 33-45, 46-64
Pts: H. Freeman, 22; Rebs: H. Freeman, 9 Asts: H. Freeman, 6		Pts: X. Huang, 18; Rebs: X. Zhang, 14; Asts: S. Lin, 12

Dubai WTC Court 1

12 June 2023
18:45

Statistics

Australia	61–53	Brazil
Scoring by quarter: 12-21, 26-29, 47-45, 61-53
Pts: A. Merritt, 28; Rebs: A. Merritt, 13; Asts: A. Merritt, 4		Pts: V. Almeida, 19; Rebs: P. Klokler, 8 Asts: P. Assuncao, 4

Dubai WTC Court 2

12 June 2023
19:00

Statistics

Spain	70–65	Canada
Scoring by quarter: 18-18, 32-32, 52-52, 70-65
Pts: K. Dandeneau, 22; Rebs: A. Young, 9 Asts: E. Tessier, 4		Pts: S. Ruiz, 18; Rebs: I. Lopez, 10; Asts: S. Ruiz, 12

Dubai WTC Court 1

13 June 2023
16:30

Statistics

Canada	66–59	Great Britain
Scoring by quarter: 15-16, 34-31, 51-39, 66-59
Pts: K. Dandeneau, 32; Rebs: K. Dandeneau, 14; Asts: C. Ouellet, 6		Pts: J. Hamer, 19; Rebs: J. Haizelden, 11; Asts: J. Haizelden, 9

Dubai WTC Court 2

13 June 2023
16:45

Statistics

Australia	52–60	Spain
Scoring by quarter: 13-14, 25-31, 36-48, 52-60
Pts: A. Merritt, 21; Rebs: G. Munro-Cook, 10; Asts: A. Merritt, 5		Pts: B. Zudaire, 17; Rebs: I. Lopez, 10; Asts: S. Ruiz, 11

Dubai WTC Court 1

13 June 2023
18:45

Statistics

Brazil	35–53	China
Scoring by quarter: 4-22, 15-30, 21-40, 35-53
Pts: S. Lin, 23; Rebs: X. Zhang, 8 Asts: S. Lin, 7		Pts: L. Martins Soares, 8 Rebs: G. Oliveira, 7 Asts: G. Oliveira, 2

Dubai WTC Court 2

14 June 2023
16:30

Statistics

Australia	68–64	Canada
Scoring by quarter: 20-17, 36-33, 53-44, 68-64
Pts: A. Merritt, 33; Rebs: G. Munro-Cook, 14; Asts: G. Inglis, 10		Pts: K. Dandeneau, 24; Rebs: K. Dandeneau, 15; Asts: C. Ouellet, 6

Dubai WTC Court 2

16 June 2023
09:45

Statistics

Spain	49–34	Brazil
Scoring by quarter: 4-8, 18-11, 34-18, 49-34
Pts: B. Zudaire, 10; Rebs: I. Lopez, 12; Asts: S. Ruiz, 6		Pts: S. Oliveria, 9 Rebs: V. Almeida, 5 Asts: P. Klokler, 2

Dubai WTC Court 2

16 June 2023
10:00

Statistics

Canada	54–50	China
Scoring by quarter: 14-10, 25-22, 45-40, 54-50
Pts: K. Dandeneau, 22; Rebs: K. Dandeneau, 16; Asts: K. Dandeneau, 5		Pts: X. Zhang, 18; Rebs: X. Zhang, 8 Asts: G. Lyu, 5

Dubai WTC Court 1

16 June 2023
14:15

Statistics

Great Britain	53–62	Australia
Scoring by quarter: 17-12, 29-32, 42-40, 53-62
Pts: A. Merritt, 25; Rebs: G. Munro-Cook, 12; Asts: G. Inglis, 9		Pts: H. Freeman, 20; Rebs: H. Freeman, 12; Asts: H. Freeman, 12

Dubai WTC Court 2

=== Placement matches ===
==== 9-12 Placing ====
Placement matches
12:00 17 June 2023
Great Britain	93
Thailand	19
10:00 17 June 2023
Algeria	29
Brazil	91

9th Place
18:45 18 June 2023
Great Britain	55
Brazil	44
11th Place
16:30 18 June 2023
Algeria	46
Thailand	63

17 June 2023
10:00

Statistics

Algeria	29–91	Brazil
Scoring by quarter: 4-28, 12-47, 19-70, 29-91
Pts: S. Abdelali, 11; Rebs: N. Khedir, 3 Asts: N. Khedir, 2		Pts: V. Almeida, 21; Rebs: P. Klokler, 7 Asts: V. Almeida, 10

Dubai WTC Court 1

17 June 2023
12:00

Statistics

Great Britain	93–19	Thailand
Scoring by quarter: 23-0, 39-5, 69-15, 93-19
Pts: J. Atkin, 27; Rebs: L. Robinson, 11; Asts: J. Haizelden, 9		Pts: N. Ponin, 12; Rebs: P. Putthanoi, 7

Dubai WTC Court 2

18 June 2023
16:30

Statistics

Algeria	46–63	Thailand
Scoring by quarter: 12-14, 18-37, 32-50, 46-63
Pts: D. Khemgani, 19; Rebs: D. Khemgani, 14; Asts: D. Khemgani, 5		Pts: N. Ponin, 22; Rebs: P. Putthanoi, 19; Asts: N. Ponin, 5

Dubai WTC Court 2

18 June 2023
18:45

Statistics

Great Britain	55–44	Brazil
Scoring by quarter: 18-12, 33-24, 43-34, 55-44
Pts: L. Robinson, 15; Rebs: L. Robinson, 12; Asts: H. Freeman, 7		Pts: V. Almeida, 21; Rebs: V. Almeida, 14; Asts: V. Almeida, 5

Dubai WTC Court 2

==== 5-8 Placing ====
Placement matches
12:00 18 June 2023
Australia	64
Japan	51
10:00 18 June 2023
Spain	47
Canada	60

5th Place
19:15 19 June 2023
Australia	62
Canada	64
7th Place
17:00 19 June 2023
Spain	51
Japan	54

18 June 2023
12:00

Statistics

Spain	47–60	Canada
Scoring by quarter: 10-17, 16-31, 33-48, 47-60
Pts: B. Zudaire, 19; Rebs: I. Lopez, 6 Asts: B. Zudaire, 6		Pts: A. Young, 23; Rebs: A. Young, 11; Asts: A. Young, 7

Dubai WTC Court 2

18 June 2023
14:15

Statistics

Australia	64–51	Japan
Scoring by quarter: 10-12, 21-20, 36-34, 64-51
Pts: A. Merritt, 37; Rebs: A. Merritt, 14; Asts: G. Inglis, 7		Pts: C. Kitada, 14; Rebs: M. Amimoto, 10; Asts: M. Amimoto, 12

Dubai WTC Court 2

19 June 2023
17:00

Statistics

Spain	51–54	Japan
Scoring by quarter: 17-12, 25-25, 37-40, 51-54
Pts: B. Zudaire, 21; Rebs: B. Zudaire, 15; Asts: V. Alsonso VilariÑo, 7		Pts: C. Kitada, 13; Rebs: M. Amimoto, 10; Asts: M. Amimoto, 10

Dubai WTC Court 2

19 June 2023
19:15

Statistics

Australia	62–64	Canada
Scoring by quarter: 18-16, 32-32, 46-46, 62-64
Pts: A. Merritt, 33; Rebs: A. Merritt, 11; Asts: G. Inglis, 8		Pts: C. Ouellet, 35; Rebs: K. Dandeneau, 10; Asts: C. Ouellet, 7

Dubai WTC Court 2

=== Finals ===
Quarter-finals
12:15 17 June 2023
Netherlands	66
Canada	47
16:45 17 June 2023
Spain	45
United States	73
14:30 17 June 2023
China	60
Japan	52
19:00 17 June 2023
Germany	64
Australia	50

Semi-finals
14:30 18 June 2023
Netherlands	72
United States	65
19:00 18 June 2023
China	49
Germany	45

Final
14:00 20 June 2023
Netherlands	57
China	34
Bronze medal
11:45 20 June 2023
Germany	42
United States	57

==== Quarter-finals ====
17 June 2023
12:15

Statistics

Netherlands	66–47	Canada
Scoring by quarter: 19-17, 35-28, 51-34, 66-47
Pts: M. Beijer, 26; Rebs: M. Beijer, 13; Asts: B. Kramer, 6		Pts: A. Young, 15; Rebs: K. Dandeneau, 9 Asts: K. Dandeneau, 4

Dubai WTC Court 1

17 June 2023
14:30

Statistics

China	60–52	Japan
Scoring by quarter: 22-15, 32-23, 43-42, 60-52
Pts: S. Lin, 26; Rebs: X. Zhang, 9 Asts: S. Lin, 7		Pts: A. Yanagimoto, 21; Rebs: M. Amimoto, 14; Asts: M. Amimoto, 8

Dubai WTC Court 1

17 June 2023
16:45

Statistics

Spain	45–73	United States
Scoring by quarter: 8-16, 22-32, 36-59, 45-73
Pts: V. Alsonso Vilariño, 19; Rebs: I. Lopez, 9 Asts: B. Zudaire, 11		Pts: R. Hollermann, 34; Rebs: R. Hollermann, 7 Asts: C. Ryan, 9

Dubai WTC Court 1

17 June 2023
19:00

Statistics

Germany	64–50	Australia
Scoring by quarter: 21-2, 31-19, 45-35, 64-50
Pts: M. Miller, 29; Rebs: M. Miller, 21; Asts: M. Miller, 9		Pts: A. Merritt, 28; Rebs: A. Merritt, 13; Asts: G. Inglis, 5

Dubai WTC Court 1

==== Semi-finals ====
18 June 2023
14:30

Statistics

Netherlands	72–65	United States
Scoring by quarter: 19-11, 35-21, 55-36, 72-65
Pts: M. Beijer, 32; Rebs: M. Beijer, 19; Asts: B. Kramer, 9		Pts: R. Hollermann, 19; Rebs: B. Murray, 6 Asts: R. Hollermann, 7

Dubai WTC Court 1

18 June 2023
19:00

Statistics

China	49–45	Germany
Scoring by quarter: 13-10, 19-19, 33-32, 49-45
Pts: X. Zhang, 18; Rebs: X. Zhang, 11; Asts: X. Huang, 10		Pts: M. Miller, 22; Rebs: K. Lang, 10; Asts: K. Lang, 4

Dubai WTC Court 1

==== Bronze medal ====
20 June 2023
11:45

Statistics

Germany	42–57	United States
Scoring by quarter: 13-13, 20-35, 30-47, 42-57
Pts: M. Miller, 15; Rebs: M. Miller, 10; Asts: M. Miller, 5		Pts: R. Hollermann, 14; Rebs: R. Hollermann, 12; Asts: R. Hollermann, 5

Dubai WTC Court 1

==== Final ====
20 June 2023
14:00

Statistics

Netherlands	57–34	China
Scoring by quarter: 16-5, 31-17, 47-26, 57-34
Pts: M. Beijer, 22; Rebs: B. Kramer, 10; Asts: B. Kramer, 5		Pts: S. Lin, 12; Rebs: S. Lin, 11; Asts: S. Lin, 5

Dubai WTC Court 1

=== Final standings ===
Rank	Team
1	Netherlands
2	China
3	United States
4	Germany
5	Canada
6	Australia
7	Japan
8	Spain
9	Great Britain
10	Brazil
11	Algeria
12	Thailand

=== Leaders ===
Points
Name	Team	Points
A. Merritt	Australia	220
M. Beijer	Netherlands	218
B. Kramer	Netherlands	190
K. Dandeneau	Canada	173
M. Miller	Germany	167
K. Lang	Germany	159
R. Hollermann	United States	158
C. Ouellet	Canada	129
S. Lin	China	125
B. Zudaire	Spain	116

Rebounds
Name	Team	Points
M. Beijer	Netherlands	99
K. Dandeneau	Canada	94
A. Merritt	Australia	88
M. Miller	Germany	86
X. Zhang	China	85
K. Lang	Germany	81
B. Kramer	Netherlands	77
M. Amimoto	Japan	75
G. Munro-Cook	Australia	69
P. Putthanoi	Thailand	66

Assists
Name	Team	Assists
M. Amimoto	Japan	74
H. Freeman	Great Britain	58
S. Lin	China	56
B. Kramer	Netherlands	52
B. Zudaire	Spain	50
G. Inglis	Australia	49
M. Miller	Germany	47
C. Ryan	United States	44
C. Ouellet	Canada	42
S. Ruiz	Spain	37

== Men ==
=== Preliminary round ===
==== Group A ====
Team	Pld	W	L	PF	PA	PD	Pts.
Australia	3	3	0	250	107	+143	6
Italy	3	2	1	221	145	+76	5
Brazil	3	1	2	173	166	+7	4
United Arab Emirates	3	0	3	86	312	-226	3

9 June 2023
19:00

Statistics

United Arab Emirates	33–101	Italy
Scoring by quarter: 11-32, 21-55, 26-79, 33-101
Pts: M. Alnaqbi, 17; Rebs: J. Albedwawi, 6 Asts: I. Alhammadi, 3		Pts: G. Papi, 15; Rebs: S. De Maggi, 7 Asts: D. Saaid, 7

Dubai WTC Court 1

11 June 2023
14:15

Statistics

Australia	61–51	Italy
Scoring by quarter: 13-18, 29-30, 47-42, 61-51
Pts: B. Latham, 16; Rebs: B. Latham, 13; Asts: S. Norris, 7		Pts: S. Bedzeti, 15; Rebs: S. Bedzeti, 8 Asts: G. Papi, 4

Dubai WTC Court 2

11 June 2023
12:00

Statistics

Brazil	83–36	United Arab Emirates
Scoring by quarter: 26-12, 44-20, 65-22, 83-36
Pts: C. Clemente, 22; Rebs: D. Gomes Do Santos, 6 Asts: A. Viana, 7		Pts: M. Alzarooni, 10; Rebs: M. Alzarooni, 11; Asts: M. Alzarooni, 7

Dubai WTC Court 2

13 June 2023
12:00

Statistics

Italy	69–51	Brazil
Scoring by quarter: 21-18, 31-22, 43-36, 69-51
Pts: S. Bedzeti, 27; Rebs: S. Bedzeti, 11; Asts: G. Papi, 8		Pts: C. Clemente, 17; Rebs: C. Clemente, 14; Asts: A. Viana, 5

Dubai WTC Court 2

13 June 2023
19:00

Statistics

United Arab Emirates	17–128	Australia
Scoring by quarter: 7-28, 9-53, 13-94, 17-128
Pts: Mohamed Alzarooni, 11; Rebs: M. Alnaqbi, 4		Pts: B. Latham, 26; Rebs: B. Latham, 4 Asts: T. Knowles, 9

Dubai WTC Court 1

14 June 2023
12:15

Statistics

Brazil	39–61	Australia
Scoring by quarter: 11-17, 21-32, 31-44, 39-61
Pts: C. Clemente, 15; Rebs: C. Clemente, 10; Asts: E. Da Silva, 3		Pts: B. Latham, 16; Rebs: B. Latham, 7 Asts: T. Knowles, 5

Dubai WTC Court 1

==== Group B ====
Team	Pld	W	L	PF	PA	PD	Pts.
Germany	3	3	0	277	120	+157	6
Canada	3	2	1	222	161	+61	5
Thailand	3	1	2	172	220	-48	4
Egypt	3	0	3	102	272	-170	3

10 June 2023
12:15

Statistics

Thailand	72–38	Egypt
Scoring by quarter: 16-12, 32-16, 54-26, 72-38
Pts: K. Pimkorn, 15; Rebs: T. Pasomsap, 7 Asts: K. Pimkorn, 6		Pts: M. Abdelaziz, 14; Rebs: M. Abbas, 7 Asts: M. Abbas, 3

Dubai WTC Court 1

10 June 2023
14:15

Statistics

Canada	52–65	Germany
Scoring by quarter: 15-22, 21-36, 35-51, 52-65
Pts: P. Anderson, 17; Rebs: P. Anderson, 10; Asts: C. Higgins, 4		Pts: T. Böhme, 22; Rebs: M. Güntner, 7 Asts: N. Dreimüller, 6

Dubai WTC Court 2

11 June 2023
18:45

Statistics

Thailand	55–83	Canada
Scoring by quarter: 21-18, 31-40, 43-65, 55-83
Pts: P. Sripirom, 21; Rebs: P. Sripirom, 12; Asts: P. Sripirom, 5		Pts: N. Goncin, 29; Rebs: N. Goncin, 8 Asts: C. Higgins, 6

Dubai WTC Court 2

11 June 2023
19:00

Statistics

Egypt	23–113	Germany
Scoring by quarter: 5-22, 11-50, 15-84, 23-113
Pts: A. Ammar, 8		Pts: A. Halouski, 29; Rebs: A. Budde, 11; Asts: J. Albrecht, 6

Dubai WTC Court 1

14 June 2023
10:00

Statistics

Egypt	41–87	Canada
Scoring by quarter: 9-21, 13-40, 27-58, 41-87
Pts: A. Ammar, 22; Rebs: A. Ammar, 7 Asts: A. Ammar, 3		Pts: C. Higgins, 21; Rebs: B. Mutware, 8 Asts: C. Higgins, 4

Dubai WTC Court 1

14 June 2023
14:15

Statistics

Germany	99–45	Thailand
Scoring by quarter: 29-10, 45-28, 71-39, 99-45
Pts: M. Güntner, 16; Rebs: A. Halouski, 8 Asts: T. Böhme, 14		Rebs: N. Chaotarakan, 6 Asts: T. Pasomsap, 3

Dubai WTC Court 2

==== Group C ====
Team	Pld	W	L	PF	PA	PD	Pts.
Netherlands	3	3	0	207	166	+41	6
France	3	1	2	187	200	-13	4
Argentina	3	1	2	198	202	-4	4
South Korea	3	1	2	169	193	-24	4

11 June 2023
09:45

Statistics

France	77–57	Argentina
Scoring by quarter: 14-14, 38-35, 61-49, 77-57
Pts: A. Cayol, 20; Rebs: N. Jouanserre, 10; Asts: S. Mehiaoui, 18		Pts: A. Berdun, 14; Rebs: A. Pérez, 8 Asts: A. Berdun, 7

Dubai WTC Court 2

11 June 2023
10:00

Statistics

South Korea	51–57	Netherlands
Scoring by quarter: 14-10, 24-28, 42-47, 51-57
Pts: D. Gim, 17; Rebs: D. Gim, 10; Asts: D. Gim, 6		Pts: M. Op Den Orth, 28; Rebs: M. Op Den Orth, 9 Asts: R. Poggenwisch, 9

Dubai WTC Court 1

12 June 2023
12:15

Statistics

Netherlands	77–46	France
Scoring by quarter: 16-15, 32-26, 50-37, 77-46
Pts: M. Op Den Orth, 38; Rebs: M. Op Den Orth, 15; Asts: R. Poggenwisch, 15		Pts: A. Cayol, 14; Rebs: S. Mehiaoui, 5 Asts: S. Mehiaoui, 4

Dubai WTC Court 1

12 June 2023
14:30

Statistics

Argentina	72–52	South Korea
Scoring by quarter: 15-15, 30-29, 48-41, 72-52
Pts: A. Berdun, 29; Rebs: A. Pérez, 9 Asts: M. Ruggeri, 5		Pts: S. Cho, 13; Rebs: D. Gim, 10; Asts: D. Gim, 4

Dubai WTC Court 1

14 June 2023
12:00

Statistics

France	64–66	South Korea
Scoring by quarter: 22-16, 36-37, 55-48, 64-66
Pts: N. Jouanserre, 26; Rebs: C. Carlier, 11; Asts: S. Mehiaoui, 9		Pts: S. Cho, 27; Rebs: D. Gim, 12; Asts: D. Gim, 9

Dubai WTC Court 2

14 June 2023
16:45

Statistics

Netherlands	73–69	Argentina
Scoring by quarter: 15-13, 38-26, 61-45, 73-69
Pts: M. Bellers, 21; Rebs: M. Op Den Orth, 9 Asts: R. Poggenwisch, 7		Pts: C. Esteche, 22; Rebs: A. Pérez, 9 Asts: A. Berdun, 7

Dubai WTC Court 1

==== Group D ====
Team	Pld	W	L	PF	PA	PD	Pts.
Great Britain	3	3	0	245	139	+106	6
United States	3	2	1	230	162	+68	5
Iran	3	1	2	216	213	+3	4
Iraq	3	0	3	88	265	-177	3

10 June 2023
14:30

Statistics

Great Britain	90–59	Iran
Scoring by quarter: 17-22, 46-31, 61-43, 90-59
Pts: L. Manning, 31; Rebs: L. Manning, 15; Asts: P. Pratt, 11		Pts: O. Hadiazhar, 21; Rebs: O. Hadiazhar, 5 Asts: O. Hadiazhar, 7

Dubai WTC Court 1

10 June 2023
16:30

Statistics

Iraq	23–92	United States
Scoring by quarter: 4-21, 11-41, 19-67, 23-92
Pts: S. Al-Taie, 7 Rebs: A. Abdullah, 6 Asts: A. Shiltagh, 4		Pts: J. Williams, 17; Rebs: B. Bell, 9 Asts: J. Sanchez, 7

Dubai WTC Court 2

12 June 2023
10:00

Statistics

United States	82–74	Iran
Scoring by quarter: 21-22, 43-41, 59-55, 82-74
Pts: J. Williams, 21; Rebs: S. Serio, 6 Asts: B. Bell, 6		Pts: O. Hadiazhar, 24; Rebs: M. Abedi, 10; Asts: O. Hadiazhar, 9

Dubai WTC Court 1

12 June 2023
12:00

Statistics

Iraq	24–90	Great Britain
Scoring by quarter: 6-21, 16-37, 20-62, 24-90
Pts: H. Al-Sarraji, H. Bashara, 8 Rebs: H. Bashara, 5 Asts: H. Al-Sarraji, 2		Pts: L. Fryer, 17; Rebs: L. Manning, 5 Asts: P. Pratt, 6

Dubai WTC Court 2

14 June 2023
09:45

Statistics

Iran	83–41	Iraq
Scoring by quarter: 18-11, 42-18, 63-30, 83-41
Pts: O. Hadiazhar, 23; Rebs: A. Ahmadi, 7 Asts: O. Hadiazhar, 9		Pts: H. Bashara, 14; Rebs: H. Bashara, 7 Asts: M. Karha, 4

Dubai WTC Court 2

14 June 2023
18:45

Statistics

United States	56–65	Great Britain
Scoring by quarter: 13-10, 33-32, 43-48, 56-65
Pts: J. Williams, 27; Rebs: J. Williams, 10; Asts: S. Serio, 5		Pts: P. Pratt, 30; Rebs: L. Manning, 18; Asts: P. Pratt, 9

Dubai WTC Court 2

=== Finals ===
Round of 16
18:45 15 June 2023
Great Britain	78
South Korea	51
12:00 15 June 2023
Italy	64
Thailand	36
16:45 15 June 2023
Germany	87
United Arab Emirates	16
14:15 15 June 2023
France	79
Iran	89
16:30 15 June 2023
Netherlands	88
Iraq	29
12:15 15 June 2023
Canada	69
Brazil	53
14:30 15 June 2023
Australia	95
Egypt	39
19:00 15 June 2023
United States	67
Argentina	50

Quarter-finals
19:00 16 June 2023
Great Britain	72
Italy	44
12:15 16 June 2023
Germany	68
Iran	70
14:30 16 June 2023
Netherlands	68
Canada	53
16:45 16 June 2023
Australia	32
United States	47

Semi-finals
16:45 18 June 2023
Great Britain	64
Iran	44
20:15 18 June 2023
Netherlands	41
United States	52

Final
16:30 20 June 2023
Great Britain	66
United States	67
Third place
09:30 20 June 2023
Netherlands	54
Iran	72

==== Round of 16 ====
15 June 2023
12:00

Statistics

Italy	64–36	Thailand
Scoring by quarter: 16-11, 32-22, 50-30, 64-36
Pts: G. Papi, 18; Rebs: S. Bedzeti, 10; Asts: F. Carossino, 9		Pts: A. Jumjarean, 7 Rebs: P. Sripirom, 12; Asts: K. Pimkorn, 7

Dubai WTC Court 2

15 June 2023
12:15

Statistics

Canada	69–53	Brazil
Scoring by quarter: 15-9, 35-20, 56-41, 69-53
Pts: C. Higgins, 22; Rebs: C. Higgins, 6 Asts: N. Goncin, 8		Pts: C. Clemente, 14; Rebs: C. Clemente, 9 Asts: C. Clemente, 4

Dubai WTC Court 1

15 June 2023
14:15

Statistics

France	79–89	Iran
Scoring by quarter: 14-23, 39-47, 61-69, 79-89
Pts: N. Jouanserre, 24; Rebs: C. Carlier, 6 Asts: S. Mehiaoui, 15		Pts: O. Hadiazhar, 28; Rebs: O. Hadiazhar, 11; Asts: M. Tolouie Tamardash, 7

Dubai WTC Court 2

15 June 2023
14:30

Statistics

Australia	95–39	Egypt
Scoring by quarter: 24-11, 51-23, 76-32, 95-39
Pts: S. Russell, 17; Rebs: B. Latham, 6 Asts: S. Norris, 8		Pts: A. Ammar, 23; Rebs: A. Ammar, 6 Asts: M. Abbas, 3

Dubai WTC Court 1

15 June 2023
16:30

Statistics

Netherlands	88–29	Iraq
Scoring by quarter: 18-6, 41-14, 59-19, 88-29
Pts: M. Bellers, 20; Rebs: M. Bellers, 13; Asts: R. Poggenwisch, 5		Pts: H. Bashara, 7 Rebs: H. Al-sarraji, 9 Asts: A. Shiltagh, 2

Dubai WTC Court 2

15 June 2023
16:45

Statistics

Germany	87–16	United Arab Emirates
Scoring by quarter: 20-2, 43-10, 72-14, 87-16
Pts: A. Halouski, 16; Rebs: J. Lammering, 8 Asts: T. Böhme, 8		Pts: M. Alnaqbi, 6 Rebs: M. Alnaqbi, 4 Asts: M. Alzarooni, 3

Dubai WTC Court 1

15 June 2023
18:45

Statistics

Great Britain	78–51	South Korea
Scoring by quarter: 26-8, 46-17, 61-30, 78-51
Pts: K. Marsh, 18; Rebs: P. Pratt, 7 Asts: P. Pratt, 10		Pts: S. Cho, 22; Rebs: D. Gim, 11; Asts: S. Cho, 7

Dubai WTC Court 2

15 June 2023
19:00

Statistics

United States	67–50	Argentina
Scoring by quarter: 16-21, 38-29, 53-39, 67-50
Pts: S. Serio, 19; Rebs: J. Williams, 7 Asts: S. Serio, 9		Pts: A. Pérez, 14; Rebs: A. Berdun, 9 Asts: A. Berdun, 7

Dubai WTC Court 1

==== 15-16 Placing ====
17 June 2023
09:45

Statistics

Iraq	65–35	United Arab Emirates
Scoring by quarter: 20-14, 32-20, 46-28, 65-35
Pts: H. Al-sarraji, 38; Rebs: H. Al-sarraji, 16; Asts: A. Abdullah, 8		Pts: M. Alhashmi, 5 Rebs: M. Alzarooni, 5 Asts: M. Alzarooni, 9

Dubai WTC Court 2

==== 13-14 Placing ====
17 June 2023
14:15

Statistics

South Korea	79–37	Egypt
Scoring by quarter: 18-8, 39-19, 56-25, 79-37
Pts: S. Kim, 21; Rebs: S. Cho, 10; Asts: S. Cho, 4		Pts: A. Ammar, 22; Rebs: M. Abbas, 11; Asts: M. Abbas, 3

Dubai WTC Court 2

==== 11-12 Placing ====
19 June 2023
14:30

Statistics

Argentina	64–43	Thailand
Scoring by quarter: 12-8, 37-20, 52-38, 64-43
Pts: A. Pérez, 20; Rebs: A. Pérez, 8 Asts: A. Berdun, 9		Pts: P. Sripirom, 14; Rebs: K. Pimkorn, 10; Asts: P. Sripirom, 5

Dubai WTC Court 1

==== 9-10 Placing ====
19 June 2023
14:45

Statistics

France	83–63	Brazil
Scoring by quarter: 23-16, 37-20, 62-41, 83-63
Pts: N. Jouanserre, 26; Rebs: N. Jouanserre, 8 Asts: S. Mehiaoui, 6		Pts: A. Viana, 17; Rebs: C. Clemente, 11; Asts: E. Da Silva, 5

Dubai WTC Court 2

==== Quarter-finals ====
16 June 2023
12:15

Statistics

Germany	68–70	Iran
Scoring by quarter: 17-26, 29-40, 46-55, 68-70
Pts: A. Halouski, 20; Rebs: J. Albrecht, 5 Asts: T. Böhme, 7		Pts: M. Sayari, 20; Rebs: M. Abedi, 10; Asts: O. Hadiazhar, 6

Dubai WTC Court 1

16 June 2023
14:30

Statistics

Netherlands	68–53	Canada
Scoring by quarter: 21-13, 38-24, 49-36, 68-53
Pts: M. Op Den Orth, 32; Rebs: M. Bellers, 13; Asts: R. Poggenwisch, 11		Pts: N. Goncin, 22; Rebs: N. Goncin, 7 Asts: P. Anderson, 8

Dubai WTC Court 1

16 June 2023
16:45

Statistics

Australia	32–47	United States
Scoring by quarter: 15-10, 20-25, 26-37, 32-47
Pts: B. Latham, 8 Rebs: B. Latham, 12; Asts: B. Latham, 4		Pts: S. Serio, 14; Rebs: B. Bell, 13; Asts: T. Jenifer, 4

Dubai WTC Court 1

16 June 2023
19:00

Statistics

Great Britain	72–44	Italy
Scoring by quarter: 18-8, 35-16, 55-29, 72-44
Pts: G. Warburton, 32; Rebs: L. Manning, 16; Asts: P. Pratt, 11		Pts: F. Carossino, 20; Rebs: S. Bedzeti, 11; Asts: F. Carossino, 3

Dubai WTC Court 1

==== 5-8 Placing ====
Placement matches
16:30 17 June 2023
Germany	45
Italy	52
18:45 17 June 2023
Australia	57
Canada	62

5th Place
18:45 19 June 2023
Italy	67
Canada	56
7th Place
14:30 19 June 2023
Australia	59
Germany	57

17 June 2023
16:30

Statistics

Germany	45–52	Italy
Scoring by quarter: 14-14, 18-26, 29-36, 45-52
Pts: A. Halouski, 12; Rebs: A. Halouski, 12; Asts: T. Böhme, 5		Pts: F. Carossino, 17; Rebs: S. Bedzeti, 18; Asts: F. Carossino, 7

Dubai WTC Court 2

17 June 2023
18:45

Statistics

Australia	57–62	Canada
Scoring by quarter: 18-18, 35-27, 47-49, 57-62
Pts: T. Knowles, 15; Rebs: T. O'Neill-Thorne, 9 Asts: T. Knowles, 6		Pts: P. Anderson, 26; Rebs: P. Anderson, 12; Asts: P. Anderson, 9

Dubai WTC Court 2

19 June 2023
16:45

Statistics

Australia	59–57	Germany
Scoring by quarter: 18-16, 31-27, 49-43, 59-57
Pts: B. Latham, 18; Rebs: B. Latham, 11; Asts: T. O'Neill-Thorne, 5		Pts: J. Albrecht, 20; Rebs: J. Albrecht, 8 Asts: A. Halouski, 4

Dubai WTC Court 1

19 June 2023
19:00

Statistics

Italy	67–56	Canada
Scoring by quarter: 23-14, 37-27, 53-41, 67-56
Pts: F. Carossino, 16; Rebs: S. Bedzeti, 13; Asts: F. Carossino, 4		Pts: N. Goncin, 15; Rebs: N. Goncin, 7 Asts: P. Anderson, 8

Dubai WTC Court 1

==== Semi-finals ====
18 June 2023
12:15

Statistics

Netherlands	41–52	United States
Scoring by quarter: 13-6, 18-16, 29-31, 41-52
Pts: M. Op Den Orth, 14; Rebs: M. Op Den Orth, 15; Asts: R. Poggenwisch, 4		Pts: J. Williams, 15; Rebs: T. Jenifer, 10; Asts: S. Serio, 6

Dubai WTC Court 1

18 June 2023
16:45

Statistics

Great Britain	64–44	Iran
Scoring by quarter: 12-10, 26-22, 51-34, 64-44
Pts: G. Warburton, 22; Rebs: P. Pratt, 9 Asts: P. Pratt, 18		Pts: O. Hadiazhar, 10; Rebs: M. Sayari, 10; Asts: O. Hadiazhar, 8

Dubai WTC Court 1

==== Bronze medal ====
20 June 2023
09:30

Statistics

Netherlands	54–72	Iran
Scoring by quarter: 15-25, 31-42, 42-58, 54-72
Pts: M. Op Den Orth, 24; Rebs: R. Poggenwisch, 8 Asts: R. Poggenwisch, 9		Pts: M. Abedi, 19; Rebs: M. Abedi, 18; Asts: O. Hadiazhar, 11

Dubai WTC Court 1

==== Final ====
20 June 2023
16:30

Statistics

Great Britain	66–67	United States
Scoring by quarter: 20-15, 43-32, 50-51, 66-67
Pts: G. Warburton, 24; Rebs: P. Pratt, 6 Asts: P. Pratt, 12		Pts: B. Bell, 18; Rebs: B. Bell, 8 Asts: S. Serio, 7

Dubai WTC Court 1

=== Final standings ===
Rank	Team
1	United States
2	Great Britain
3	Iran
4	Netherlands
5	Italy
6	Canada
7	Australia
8	Germany
9	France
10	Brazil
11	Argentina
12	Thailand
13	South Korea
14	Egypt
15	Iraq
16	United Arab Emirates
