= Natalie Schneider =

American wheelchair basketball player

Personal information
- Full name: Natalie Mae Schneider
- Born: February 11, 1983 (age 43) Crete, Nebraska, U.S.
- Height: 5 ft 9 in (1.75 m)

Sport
- Sport: Wheelchair basketball
- Disability class: 4.5
- Coached by: Christina Schwab
Medal record
Women's wheelchair basketball
Paralympic Games
Gold medal – first place	2008 Beijing	Team
Gold medal – first place	2016 Rio	Team
Silver medal – second place	2024 Paris	Team
Bronze medal – third place	2020 Tokyo	Team
World Championship
Gold medal – first place	2010 Birmingham	Team
Bronze medal – third place	2022 Dubai	Team
Parapan American Games
Gold medal – first place	2011 Guadalajara	Team
Gold medal – first place	2023 Santiago	Team
Silver medal – second place	2019 Lima	Team

Natalie Mae Schneider (born February 11, 1983) is an American wheelchair basketball player and member of the United States women's national wheelchair basketball team.

== Career ==
She won her first gold medal at the 2008 Summer Paralympics and got the second one at the North American Cup same year. In 2010, she won gold medal at IWBF World Championship.

She represented the United States at the 2022 Wheelchair Basketball World Championships and won a bronze medal.

In November 2023 she competed at the 2023 Parapan American Games in the wheelchair basketball tournament and won a gold medal. As a result, the team earned an automatic bid to the 2024 Summer Paralympics. On March 30, 2024, she was named to Team USA's roster to compete at the 2024 Summer Paralympics.
