= Mariska Beijer =

Dutch wheelchair basketball player

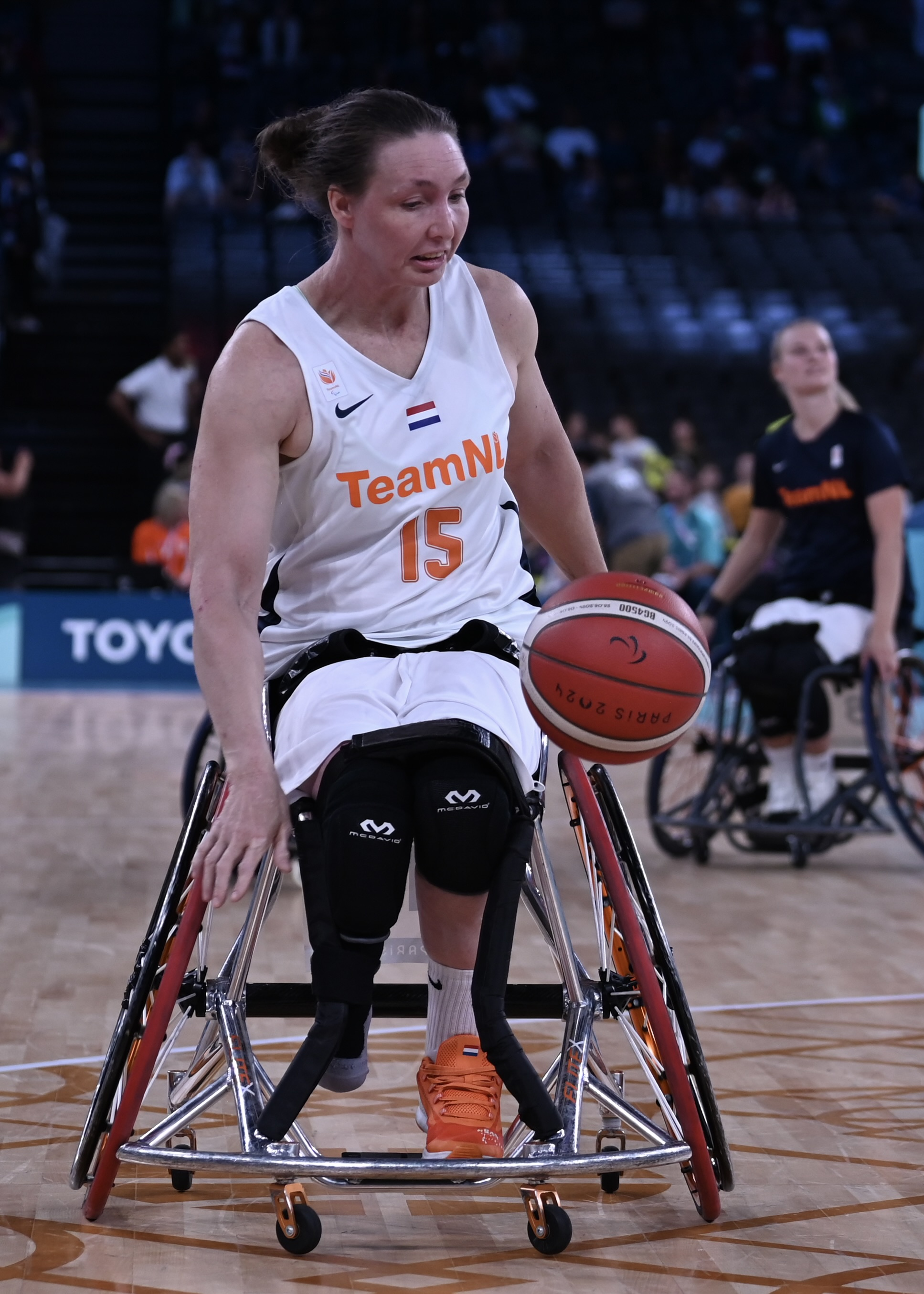

Personal information
- Born: 29 June 1991 (age 35) Den Helder, Netherlands

Sport
- Country: Netherlands
- Sport: Wheelchair basketball
- Disability: Limb deficiency
- Disability class: 4.0
Medal record
Paralympic Games
Gold medal – first place	2020 Tokyo	Team
Gold medal – first place	2024 Paris	Team
Bronze medal – third place	2012 London	Team
Bronze medal – third place	2016 Rio	Team
World Championship
Gold medal – first place	2018 Hamburg	Team
Gold medal – first place	2022 Dubai	Team
Bronze medal – third place	2014 Toronto	Team
Bronze medal – third place	2026 Ottawa	Team
European Championship
Gold medal – first place	2013 Frankfurt	Team
Gold medal – first place	2017 Tenerife	Team
Gold medal – first place	2019 Rotterdam	Team
Gold medal – first place	2021 Madrid	Team
Silver medal – second place	2009 Stoke Mandeville	Team
Silver medal – second place	2011 Nazareth	Team
Silver medal – second place	2015 Worcester	Team

Mariska Beijer (born 29 June 1991) is a Dutch wheelchair basketball player.

== Career ==
Beijer competed at the Paralympic Games where she won gold medals at the 2020 and 2024 games, and bronze medals at the 2012 and 2016 games.

She has been part of the Netherlands team at the Wheelchair Basketball World Championships where they came 3rd at the 2014 Championship and 1st at the 2018 and 2022 Championships. She participated in the European Wheelchair Basketball Championship where the Netherlands team came first in 2013, 2017, 2019 and 2021 and 2nd in 2009, 2011 and 2015. She was also the lead scorer in 2015, 2017 and 2019.

She was shortlisted for the 2019 Team Sportswoman of the Year Award.
