= 2024 IWBF Women's Repechage =

Wheelchair basketball tournament in Osaka

2024 IWBF Women’s Repechage
- Venue: Asue Arena Osaka
- Location: Osaka, Japan
- Start date: 17 April 2024
- End date: 20 April 2024
- Competitors: 8 teams from 8 nations

The 2024 IWBF Women’s Repechage was held at the Asue Arena Osaka in Osaka, Japan, between 17 and 20 April 2024. Germany, Japan, Spain and Canada qualified for a place at the 2024 Summer Paralympics in Paris, France.

== Background ==
Wheelchair basketball at the 2024 Summer Paralympics in Paris, France, to be hosted between 29 August to 8 September 2024, will feature men's and women's tournaments. There will be reduced number of teams participating: eight teams in each tournament, four less men's teams and two less women's teams than in the previous Games. The 2022 Wheelchair Basketball World Championships were held in Dubai in United Arab Emirates, from 8 to 20 June 2023. As a result, two places were awarded to the Europe, one to the Americas and one to Asia-Oceania. The winners of these championships qualified, while eight runners up qualified for the repechage.

At the 2023 European Para Championships in Rotterdam from 8 to 20 August 2023, Great Britain and the Netherlands earned places in Paris, and Germany, Spain earned places in the repechage, as did France as the host nation of the Paralympics. The 2023 Parapan American Games in Santiago from 17 to 26 November 2023 saw the United States qualify and Canada earn a place at the repechage. At the 2024 IWBF Asia-Oceania Championships in Bangkok from 12 to 20 January 2024, China as the winning team earned a place at the Paris 2024 Paralympics Games, and Australia and Thailand earned a place in the 2024 IWBF Women's Repechage in Osaka, Japan, as did Japan as its host nation. Algeria, as the African zone champion, completed the roster of eight teams in the repechage.

== Results ==
The 2024 IWBF Women’s Repechage was held at the Asue Arena Osaka in Osaka, Japan, between 17 and 20 April 2024. Germany, Japan, Spain and Canada qualified for a place at the 2024 Summer Paralympics in Paris, France.

== Tournament ==
=== Pool A ===
Team	Pld	W	L	PF	PA	PD	Pts
Germany	3	3	0	250	75	+175	6
Australia	3	2	1	154	135	+19	5
Thailand	3	1	2	122	177	-55	4
Algeria	3	0	3	83	222	-139	3

17 April 2024
10:00

Statistics

Algeria	27–73	Australia
Scoring by quarter: 8-13, 8-43, 12-59, 27-73
Pts: K. Zairi, 17; Rebs: D. Khemgani, 14; Asts: D. Khemgani, 5		Pts: G. Munro Cook, 31; Rebs: G. Munro Cook, 10; Asts: S. Matheson, 5

Asue Arena Osaka

17 April 2024
12:45

Statistics

Germany	87–28	Thailand
Scoring by quarter: 25-6, 40-17, 69-24, 87-28
Pts: M. Miller, 35; Rebs: M. Miller, 18; Asts: M. Miller, 7		Pts: N. Ponin, 13; Rebs: N. Ponin, 7

Asue Arena Osaka

18 April 2024
10:30

Statistics

Australia	48–38	Thailand
Scoring by quarter: 10-18, 28-30, 41-34, 48-38
Pts: G. Munro Cook, 22; Rebs: G. Munro Cook, 13; Asts: K. Gauci, 4		Pts: N. Ponin, 12; Rebs: W. Thamlaaied, 9 Asts: P. Putthanoi, 6

Asue Arena Osaka

18 April 2024
15:00

Statistics

Algeria	14–93	Germany
Scoring by quarter: 0-24, 7-49, 14-75, 14-93
Pts: M. Miller, 18; Rebs: M. Miller, 8 Asts: M. Miller, 9		Rebs: D. Khemgani, 8

Asue Arena Osaka

19 April 2024
10:30

Statistics

Thailand	56–42	Algeria
Scoring by quarter: 13-14, 25-22, 38-32, 56-42
Pts: N. Ponin, 23; Rebs: P. Putthanoi, 13; Asts: W. Thamlaaied, 7		Pts: D. Khemgani, 22; Rebs: K. Zairi, 12; Asts: D. Khemgani, 5

Asue Arena Osaka

19 April 2024
15:00

Statistics

Australia	33–70	Germany
Scoring by quarter: 10-18, 22-32, 24-52, 33-70
Pts: K. Gauci, 11; Rebs: S. Matheson, 7 Asts: K. Gauci, 4		Pts: M. Miller, 29; Rebs: M. Miller, 15; Asts: S. Mayer, 8

Asue Arena Osaka

=== Pool B ===
Team	Pld	W	L	PF	PA	PD	Pts
Canada	3	3	0	234	135	+99	6
Spain	3	2	1	170	160	+10	5
Japan	3	1	2	146	183	-37	4
France	3	0	3	116	188	-72	3

17 April 2024
15:00

Statistics

Japan	46–81	Canada
Scoring by quarter: 13-21, 28-41, 35-55, 46-81
Pts: C. Kitada, 15; Rebs: C. Kitada, 9 Asts: C. Kitada, 5		Pts: A. Young, 20; Rebs: A. Young, 10; Asts: K. Dandeneau, 10

Asue Arena Osaka

17 April 2024
17:15

Statistics

Spain	57–38	France
Scoring by quarter: 21-4, 29-14, 49-21, 57-38
Pts: B. Zudaire, 19; Rebs: I. Lopez, 13; Asts: B. Zudaire, 8		Pts: A. Pichon, 9 Rebs: M. Blais, 6 Asts: L. Nolet, 4

Asue Arena Osaka

18 April 2024
12:45

Statistics

Spain	49–77	Canada
Scoring by quarter: 15-17, 23-31, 35-53, 49-77
Pts: B. Zudaire, 12; Rebs: B. Zudaire, 12; Asts: S. Ruiz, 5		Pts: K. Dandeneau, 35; Rebs: A. Young, 14; Asts: A. Young, 6

Asue Arena Osaka

18 April 2024
17:15

Statistics

France	38–55	Japan
Scoring by quarter: 15-17, 24-33, 30-49, 38-55
Pts: M. Blais, 13; Rebs: M. Blais, 11; Asts: L. Nolet, 4		Pts: C. Kitada, 17; Rebs: C. Kitada, 12; Asts: M. Amimoto, 8

Asue Arena Osaka

19 April 2024
12:45

Statistics

Canada	76–40	France
Scoring by quarter: 14-6, 30-14, 52-28, 76-40
Pts: A. Young, 26; Rebs: K. Dandeneau, 12; Asts: A. Young, 9		Pts: M. Blais, 14; Rebs: M. Blais, 10; Asts: L. Nolet, 7

Asue Arena Osaka

19 April 2024
17:15

Statistics

Japan	45–64	Spain
Scoring by quarter: 12-18, 24-28, 33-42, 45-64
Pts: C. Kitada, 20; Rebs: M. Amimoto, 12; Asts: M. Amimoto, 10		Pts: B. Zudaire, 15; Rebs: I. Lopez, 12; Asts: B. Zudaire, 12

Asue Arena Osaka

=== Finals ===
20 April 2024
10:30

Statistics

Canada	88–30	Algeria
Scoring by quarter: 32-6, 49-16, 72-20, 88-30
Pts: K. Dandeneau, 24; Rebs: K. Dandeneau, 9 Asts: K. Dandeneau, 8		Pts: D. Khemgani, 9 Rebs: W. Ihamouchen, 6 Asts: D. Khemgani, 4

Asue Arena Osaka

20 April 2024
13:00

Statistics

Spain	76–35	Thailand
Scoring by quarter: 27-9, 44-22, 59-27, 76-35
Pts: B. Zudaire, 21; Rebs: B. Zudaire, 13; Asts: S. Ruiz, 10		Pts: S. Nanthasombat, 18; Rebs: W. Thamlaaied, 6 Asts: P. Putthanoi, 4

Asue Arena Osaka

20 April 2024
15:30

Statistics

Germany	58–25	France
Scoring by quarter: 18-8, 38-15, 50-19, 58-25
Pts: M. Miller, 18; Rebs: M. Miller, 14; Asts: M. Miller, 8		Pts: A. Pichon, 17; Rebs: A. Pichon, 9 Asts: L. Nolet, 3

Asue Arena Osaka

20 April 2024
18:00

Statistics

Australia	26–50	Japan
Scoring by quarter: 4-13, 7-25, 13-36, 26-50
Pts: G. Munro Cook, 15; Rebs: G. Munro Cook, 10; Asts: S. Matheson, 4		Pts: C. Kitada, 18; Rebs: C. Kitada, 18; Asts: A. Yanagimoto, 6

Asue Arena Osaka
