= Courtney Ryan =

American wheelchair basketball player

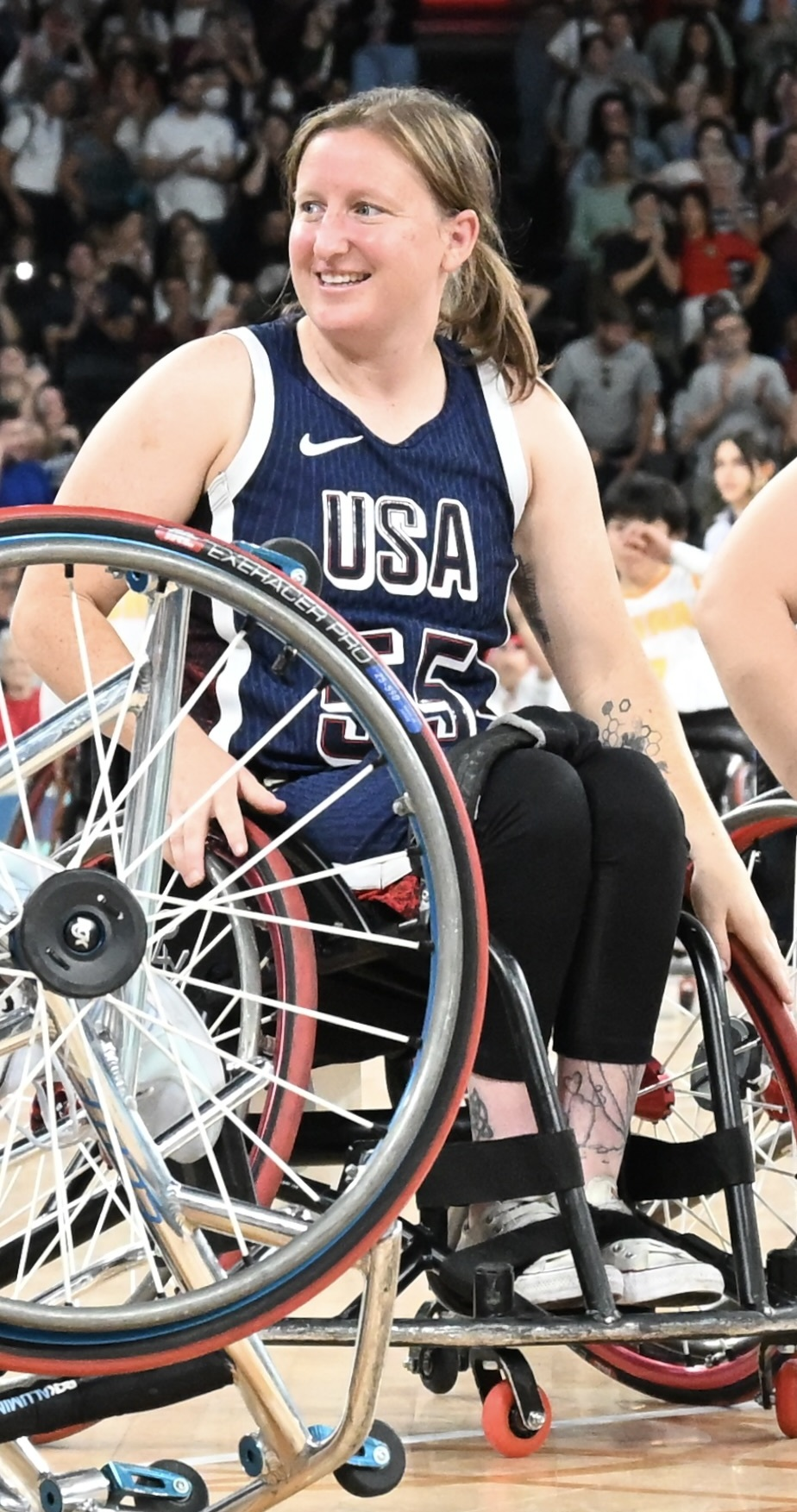
- Ryan at the 2024 Summer Paralympics

Personal information
- Nationality: United States
- Born: September 21, 1990 (age 36) San Diego, California, U.S.
- Height: 5 ft 3 in (160 cm)

Sport
- Country: United States
- Sport: Soccer, Wheelchair basketball
- Disability class: 2.0
- Event: Women's team
- College team: Metropolitan State University of Denver, University of Arizona
- Club: Sydney Metro Blues
Medal record
Women's wheelchair basketball
Paralympic Games
Silver medal – second place	2024 Paris	Team
Bronze medal – third place	2020 Tokyo	Team
World Championship
Gold medal – first place	2026 Ottawa	Team
Bronze medal – third place	2022 Dubai	Team
Parapan American Games
Gold medal – first place	2023 Santiago	Team
Association football career
- Position: Defender
Youth career
- –2008: Coronado Islanders
College career
Years	Team	Apps	(Gls)
2008–2010	Metro State Roadrunners	54	(3)

Courtney Anne Ryan (born September 21, 1990) is a 2.0 point American wheelchair basketball player and member of the United States women's national wheelchair basketball team. In 2017, she played for the Sydney Metro Blues in the Women's National Wheelchair Basketball League in Australia.

== Early life ==
Courtney Anne Ryan was born in San Diego, California, on September 21, 1990, the daughter of Kevin and Patti Ryan. She has a brother, Chris, and a sister, Caitlin. She attended Coronado High School, where she played soccer. She was Coronado's Rookie of the Year in 2007 as a junior, and as an education the following year was a first team All-Western League performer, was named to the all-section team, and was Most Valuable Player.

In 2008, she entered Metropolitan State University of Denver, where she played soccer for its team, the Roadrunners. As a freshman, she played 25 games, in which she scored one goal and was credited with seven assists. In 2009, she played 24 games as a defender. She was named first team All-America and first team All-Central Region, and set a school record for defenders with 15 assists on the season.

Ryan played only five games in 2010. During the fifth, against Colorado Mesa University on October 8, 2010, she was tackled from behind and fell on her back. A blood clot developed that burst and leaked into her spinal cord, leaving her paralysed from the waist down. She stayed at Metro for the 2011 spring semester, then returned to San Diego. She became involved with the Challenged Athletes Foundation, and took up wheelchair basketball.

== Career ==
Pete Hughes, the head coach of the University of Arizona Wildcats women's wheelchair basketball team saw Ryan play a game in which she sank a game-winning buzzer-beater. After the game, he offered her a scholarship. She entered the University of Arizona in the fall of 2012. She enrolled in its College of Education, majoring in special education, with an emphasis in rehabilitation, planning to earn a master's degree in rehabilitation counseling or disability studies.

Hughes was sufficiently impressed with Ryan's attitude, ability and performance that he wrote a letter of recommendation to Stephanie Wheeler, the head coach of the USA national women's wheelchair basketball team. Two weeks later, Ryan was one of 30 players invited to try out for the national teams at tryouts held in Birmingham, Alabama. In April, she was selected for the team, making her international debut in eight games against the German national team. She played with the national team at the 2014 Women's World Wheelchair Basketball Championship in Toronto. The United States came fourth.

In 2017, Ryan played for the Sydney Metro Blues in the Women's National Wheelchair Basketball League in Australia. The Blues went on to win the league championship. In August 2019, Ryan became the assistant coach of the University of Arizona women's wheelchair basketball team.

She represented the United States at the 2022 Wheelchair Basketball World Championships and won a bronze medal.

In November 2023 she competed at the 2023 Parapan American Games in the wheelchair basketball tournament and won a gold medal. As a result, the team earned an automatic bid to the 2024 Summer Paralympics. On March 30, 2024, she was named to Team USA's roster to compete at the 2024 Summer Paralympics.

== Personal life ==
Ryan is married to her former University of Arizona teammate Molly Bloom.
