= Amber Merritt =

21st-century Australian wheelchair basketball player

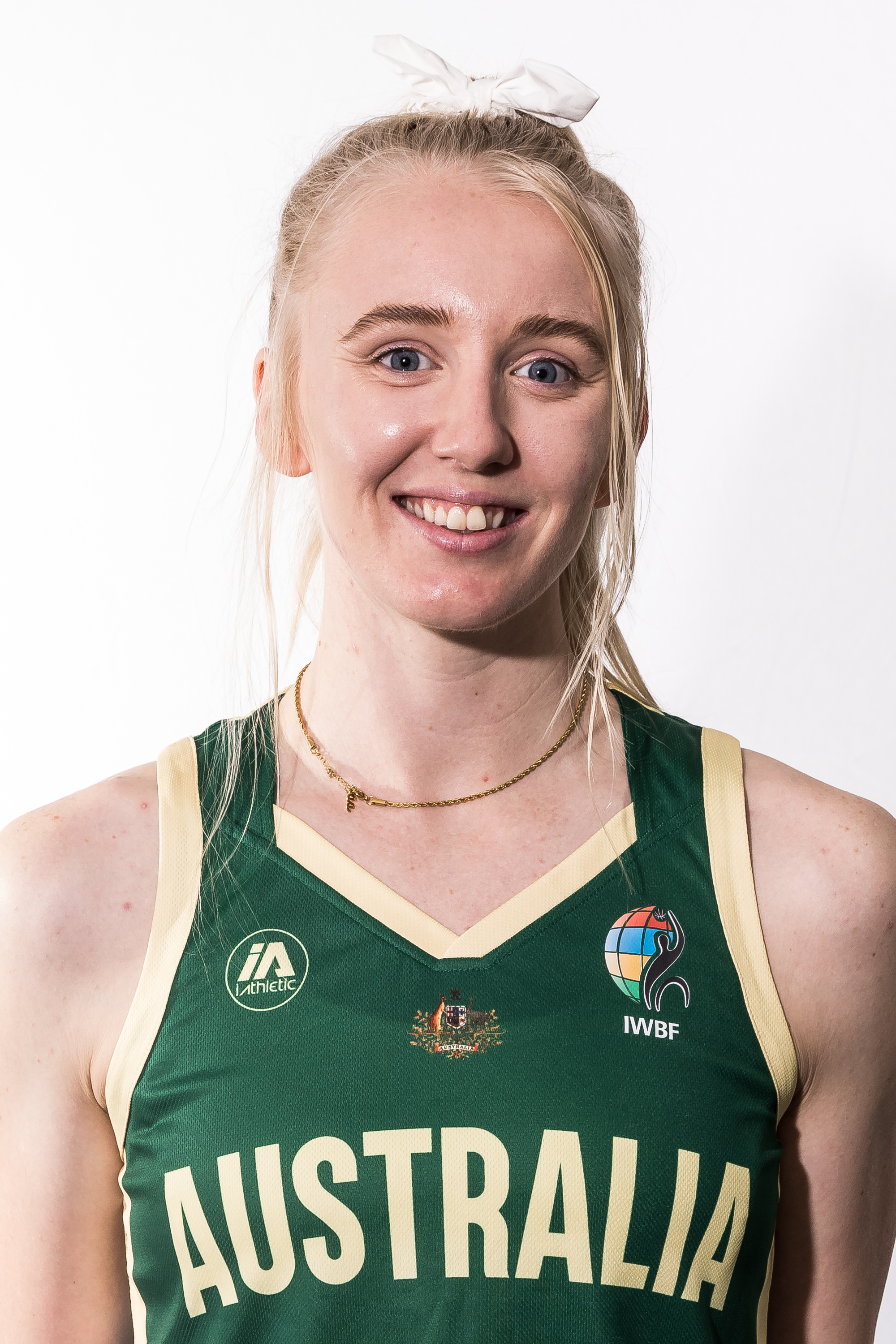
- in 2023

Personal information
- Nickname: Bambi
- Nationality: Australia; England
- Born: 17 February 1993 (age 33) Portsmouth, England

Sport
- Country: Australia
- Sport: Wheelchair basketball
- Disability class: 4.5
- Event: Women's team
- Club: Perth Wheelcats
Medal record
Wheelchair basketball
Paralympic Games
Silver medal – second place	2012 London	Women's wheelchair basketball
U25 Women's World Championships
Silver medal – second place	2011 St Catharines	Women's wheelchair basketball
Silver medal – second place	2015 Beijing	Women's wheelchair basketball
Commonwealth Games
Silver medal – second place	2022 Birmingham	3x3 Competition

Amber Merritt (born 17 February 1993) is a 4.5-point wheelchair basketball player who plays forward. She represented Australia at the 2012 Summer Paralympics in London, where she won a silver medal and at the 2020 Summer Paralympics in Tokyo.

Born in England, Merritt moved to Australia when she was ten years old. She was originally a swimmer, but was recruited into basketball by the Paralympic Hall of Fame coach Frank Ponta in 2007. She started playing top-level club wheelchair basketball in Australia for the Perth Western Stars in the Women's National Wheelchair Basketball League (WNWBL) in 2008. In 2013, she captained the team, and it to its first WNWBL championship. She was the league's top scorer, and the Most Valuable Player 4 pointer in its All Star Five, in 2011, 2012 and 2013.

Merritt made her debut with the Australia women's national wheelchair basketball team, known as the Gliders, in 2009. She has played for the Gliders in a number of international series including the 2010 U23 World Championship, 2011 U25 World Championship, 2011, 2012 and 2013 Osaka Cups, the 2012 BT Paralympic World Cup, and 2012 Gliders and Rollers World Challenge in Sydney.

== Personal life ==
Wikinews reporters interview Australian Gliders Leanne Del Toso, Sarah Vinci, Amber Merritt and Clare Nott

Nicknamed Bambi, Merritt was born on 17 February 1993 in Portsmouth, England, with a club foot. She moved to Perth in Western Australia when she was ten after her parents decided they wanted to see what else the world had to offer, and graduated from high school there in 2010. As of 2013, she lives in Wanneroo, Western Australia.

== Wheelchair basketball ==
Merritt is a 4.5-point wheelchair basketball who plays forward. She started playing in 2007. She was originally a swimmer, but was recruited into basketball by the Paralympic Hall of Fame coach Frank Ponta.

In financial year 2012/13, the Australian Sports Commission gave Merritt a A$20,000 grant as part of their Direct Athlete Support (DAS) program. She received $17,000 in 2011/12 and 2010/11 and $5,571.42 in 2009/10.

Wearing jersey number 14, Merritt started playing top-level club wheelchair basketball in Australia for the Perth Western Stars in the Women's National Wheelchair Basketball League in 2008. In the second round of that season, the Western Stars defeated the Hills Hornets 52–44. Playing for the Stars, she scored 10 points in her team's victory.

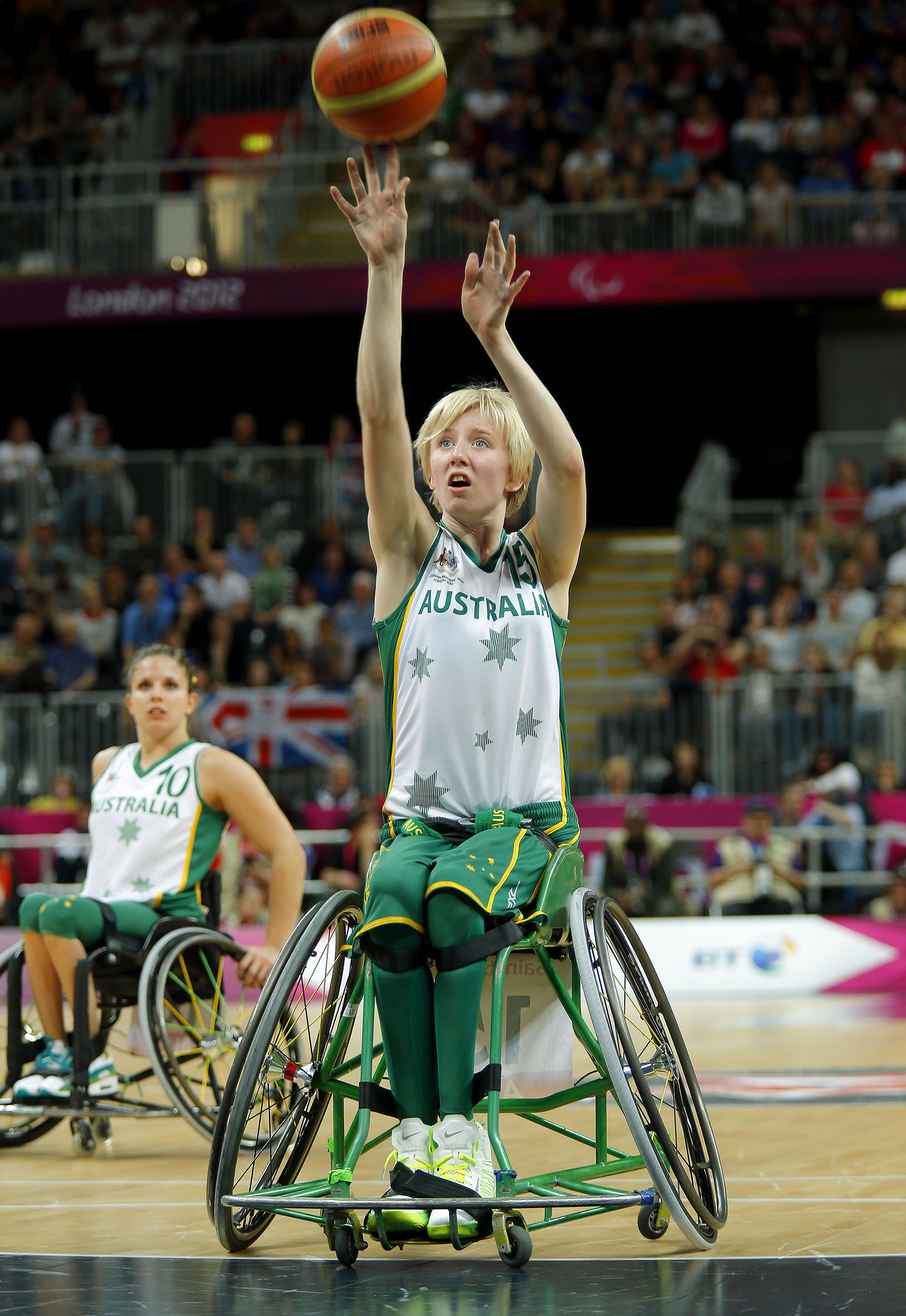
Merritt at the 2012 London Paralympics

In the 2012 season during the first game loss, Merritt scored eight points, had five rebounds, and two assists. In the league's third game and her team's second game, a loss to the Dandenong Rangers, she scored 26 points, and had 14 rebounds. In her team's third game victory against the Sydney Uni Flames, she scored 18 points, while having 10 rebounds. In the Western Stars' 56–36 semi-final victory against the Sydney Uni Flames, she played an important role. The Western Stars played in the league's third place match, where she led it in scoring with 34 points as they defeated Sydney 63–54. She finished the season as the WNWBL Season Top Scorer,

Merritt was the Western Stars' captain for the 2013 season, and led the team to its first WNWBL championship, defeating the Sachs Goldcamp Bears in the final 43–40 despite being 11 points down at three-quarter time. She was the league's top scorer, and the Most Valuable Player 4 pointer in its All Star Five, as she had previously been in 2011 and 2012.

Merritt made her debut with the Australia women's national wheelchair basketball team, known as the Gliders, in 2009, playing in several different competitions that year including the Japan Friendly Series, Four Nations in Canada and the Under 23 World Championship where her team finished fourth. As the youngest member of the Australian team at the 2010 World Championships, she finished fourth. She competed in the 2011 Asia Oceania Regional Championships, scoring ten points for her team as the third leading scorer in the final game of a competition where her did not lose a single match. That year, she also represented Australia at the 2011 Under 25 World Championships, where she wore shirt number 7 and was a key blocker for her team. Merritt played in the 2011 Osaka Cup, and the 2012 BT Paralympic World Cup. She competed at the 2012 Gliders and Rollers World Challenge in Sydney, scoring the winning points in the first place match against the Germany women's national wheelchair basketball team, and was named the women's MVP for the competition, having averaged 17.8 points per game.

Merritt was selected to represent Australia at the 2012 Summer Paralympics in wheelchair basketball. The London Games were her first. In the group stage, the Australia women's national wheelchair basketball team at the 2012 Summer Paralympics posted wins against Brazil, Great Britain, and the Netherlands, but lost to the Canada. This was enough to advance the Gliders to the quarter-finals, where they beat Mexico. The Gliders then defeated the United States by a point to set up a final clash with Germany. The Gliders lost 44–58, and earned a silver medal.

Since the London games, Merritt has participated in the 2013 Osaka Cup, where the Gliders successfully defended the title they had won in 2008, 2009, 2010 and 2012. She represented Australia at the 2018 Wheelchair Basketball World Championship in Hamburg, where the team came ninth, and the 2020 Tokyo Paralympics, the Gliders again finished ninth after winning the 9th-10th classification match. She was a member of the Australian team that won the silver medal in the 3x3 Women's tournament at the 2022 Commonwealth Games, and the Gliders team at the 2022 Wheelchair Basketball World Championships in Dubai.

Merritt announced her retirement in November 2023 after 15-year-career.

== Statistics ==
Season statistics
Competition	Season	M	MIN	FGM–A	FG%	2PM–A	2P%	3PM–A	3P%	FTM–A	FT%	PFS	Pts	OFF	DEF	TOT	AST	STL	BLK	TO	PF	PTS
WNWBL	2009	17	596:48	127–254	50.0	127–250	50.8	0–4	0.0	18–54	33.3	36	272	n/a	n/a	10.9	2.0	n/a	n/a	n/a	n/a	16.0
WNWBL	2010	17	n/a	159–282	56.4	n/a	n/a	0–5	0.0	15–55	27.3	40	333	n/a	n/a	9.8	1.5	n/a	n/a	n/a	n/a	19.6
WNWBL	2011	19	n/a	207–406	51.0	n/a	n/a	0–3	0.0	32–84	38.1	49	446	n/a	n/a	13.7	2.6	n/a	n/a	n/a	n/a	23.5
WNWBL	2012	15	n/a	169–350	48.3	n/a	n/a	0–5	0.0	49–85	57.6	33	387	n/a	n/a	9.9	2.9	n/a	n/a	n/a	n/a	25.8
WNWBL	2013	14	518:43	204–367	55.6	204–364	56.0	0–3	0.0	32–76	42.1	25	440	3.1	7.4	10.4	3.6	1.6	0.6	2.3	1.8	31.4

Key
M : Matches played	MIN : Minutes played
FGM, FGA, FG%: field goals made, attempted and percentage	3FGM, 3FGA, 3FG%: three-point field goals made, attempted and percentage
FTM, FTA, FT%: free throws made, attempted and percentage	OFF, DEF, TOT: rebounds average offensive, defensive, total per game
AST: assists average per game	STL: steals average per game
BLK: blocks average per game	TO: turnovers average per game
PFS, PF: personal fouls, average per game	Pts, PTS: points, average per game
n/a: not applicable
