= Bo Kramer =

Dutch wheelchair basketball player

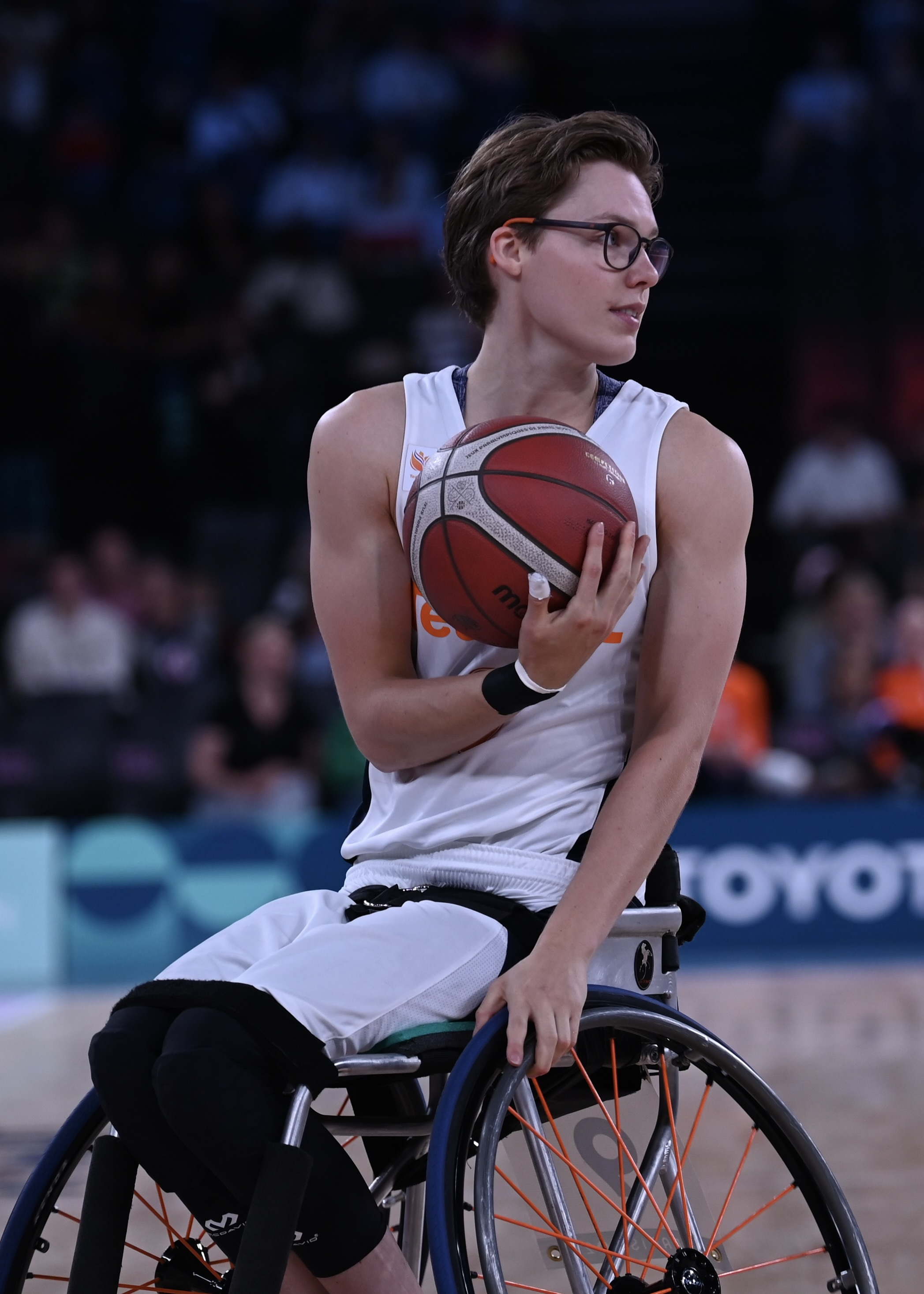

Personal information
- Born: 15 September 1998 (age 28) Almere, Netherlands

Sport
- Country: Netherlands
- Sport: Wheelchair basketball
- Disability: impaired muscle power
- Disability class: 4.5
Medal record
Women's wheelchair basketball
Representing Netherlands
Paralympic Games
Gold medal – first place	2020 Tokyo	Team
Gold medal – first place	2024 Paris	Team
World Championship
Bronze medal – third place	2026 Ottawa	Team

Bo Kramer (born 15 September 1998) is a Dutch para-wheelchair athlete. A wheelchair basketball player who represents the Netherlands, she won bronze at the 2016 Summer Paralympics and gold at the 2020 Summer Paralympics and the 2024 Summer Paralympics. She was described as "one of the top wheelchair basketball players in the world" by the BBC. Kramer is openly gay.
