= Katharina Lang =

German wheelchair basketball player

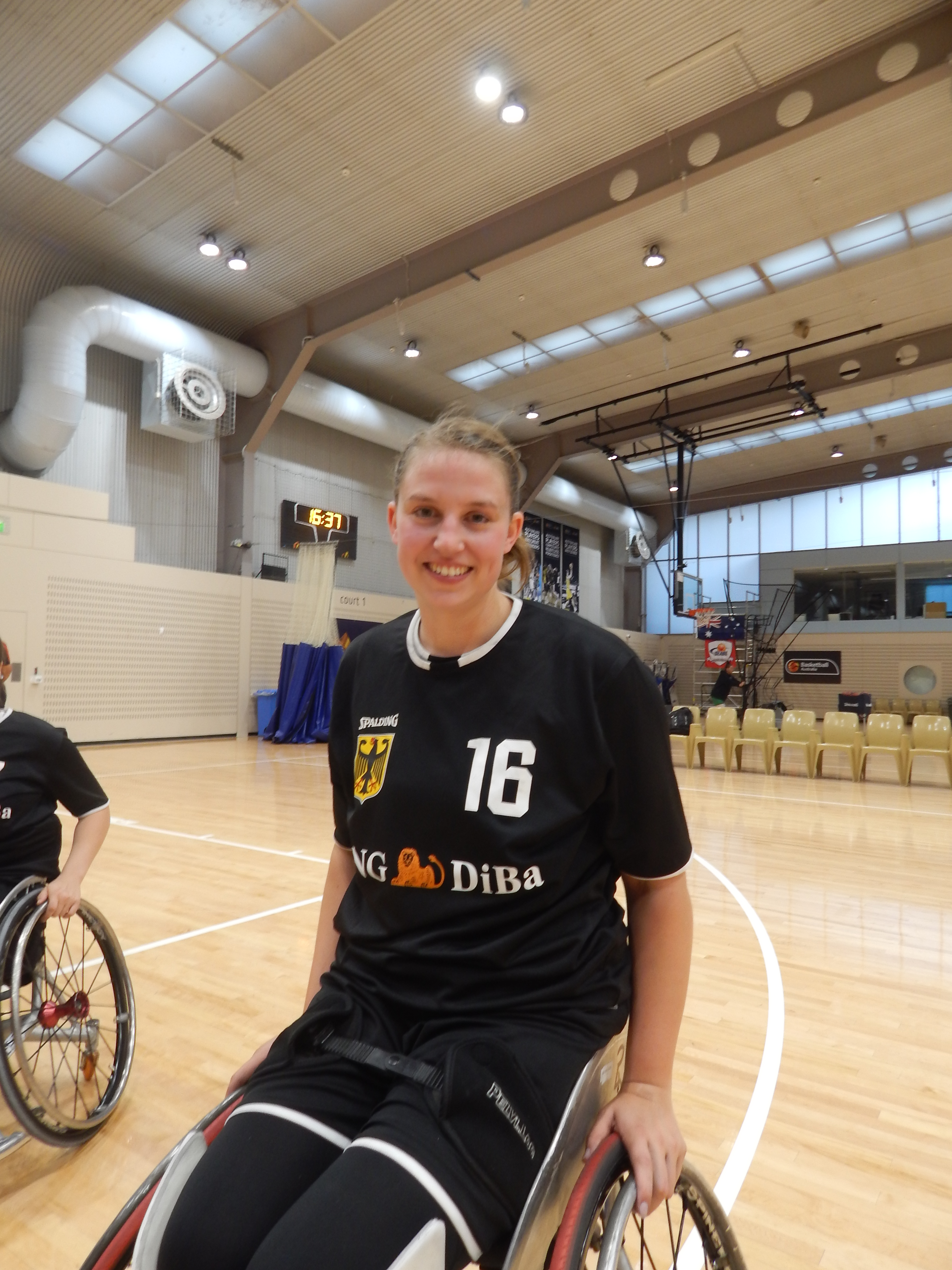
- Lang in 2018

Personal information
- Full name: Katharina Barbara Lang
- Nickname: Kate
- Born: 2 January 1993 (age 33) Munich, Germany
- Height: 1.81 m (5 ft 11 in)

Sport
- Country: Germany
- Sport: Wheelchair Basketball
- Disability class: 4.5
- Event: Women's team
- College team: University of Alabama
- Club: RBB München Iguanas

Achievements and titles
- Paralympic finals: 2020
Medal record
Wheelchair basketball
IWBF World Championship
Bronze medal – third place	2018 Hamburg, Germany	Women's wheelchair basketball
IWBF European Championship
Silver medal – second place	2017 Tenerife, Spain	Women's wheelchair basketball
Bronze medal – third place	2019 Rotterdam, Netherlands	Women's wheelchair basketball

Katharina Barbara Lang (born 2 January 1993) is a German 4.5 point national wheelchair basketball player who plays in the wheelchair basketball league for the RBB Iguanas München, and for the German national team, with which she won bronze at the 2018 Wheelchair Basketball World Championship in Hamburg.

== Biography ==
Katharina Lang was born in Munich on 2 January 1993. She began playing basketball when she was five years old. In 2009 she became a German U16 national champion with Bad Aibling, where one of her teammates was her twin sister Franziska, who went on to play for OSB Munich. Lang's own basketball career was dogged by a series of knee injuries. She tore her anterior cruciate ligament five times - in 2009, 2010, 2011, 2012 and 2014 - and after the final injury it looked like her sporting career was over. But her former coach was now coaching wheelchair basketball in Munich, and encouraged her to give the sport a go.

A 4.5 point player, Lang made her international debut with the German national team in 2017 in the 2017 European Wheelchair Basketball Championship in Tenerife, Spain, where the German team won silver. She then joined the team at the University of Alabama in the United States, where she studied marketing and won two National Championships. She went on to win bronze at the World Championships in front of a home crowd in Hamburg in 2018, and at the European Championships in Rotterdam the following year.

In 2020, as a result of the COVID-19 pandemic, foreign students were instructed to leave the United States, but Lang still managed to complete her bachelor's degree with honours remotely in 2021, even though this meant attending lectures at four in the morning due to the time difference, and won the University of Alabama Adapted Athletics Academic Award for academic achievements by a member of an adapted athletics team. She also required surgery on her left shoulder that year that put her out of action for five months.

Lang returned to playing in Alabama in the 2020–21 season, when she was captain of the team that won the national title and won MVP. later that year she was part of the German team at the 2020 Summer Paralympics, where the German team lost the bronze medal match against the United States and finished fourth.

== Achievements ==
- 2017: Silver at the European Championships (Tenerife, Spain)
- 2018: Bronze at the World Championships (Hamburg, Germany)
- 2019: Bronze at the European Championships (Rotterdam, Netherlands)
