= China women's national wheelchair basketball team =

China
- IWBF zone: IWBF Asia+Oceania

Paralympic Games
- Appearances: 4
- Medals: Silver: 2020 Bronze: 2024

World Championships
- Appearances: 2
- Medals: Silver: 2022

The China women's national wheelchair basketball team is the wheelchair basketball side that represents China in international competitions for women as part of the International Wheelchair Basketball Federation.

The team was formed in 2005.

== Competitions ==
=== Wheelchair Basketball World Championship ===
Year	Position	W	L
(United Kingdom) 2010	8th		
(South Korea) 2014			
Total			

=== Summer Paralympics ===
Year	Position
(China) 2008	7th
(United Kingdom) 2012	5th
(Japan) 2020	2nd place, silver medalist(s)
(France) 2024	3rd place, bronze medalist(s)
Total	

=== Asian Para Games ===
Year	Position
(China) 2010	2nd place, silver medalist(s)
(South Korea) 2014	1st place, gold medalist(s)
(Indonesia) 2018	1st place, gold medalist(s)
(China) 2022	1st place, gold medalist(s)
Total	
