= Kady Dandeneau =

Canadian wheelchair basketball player

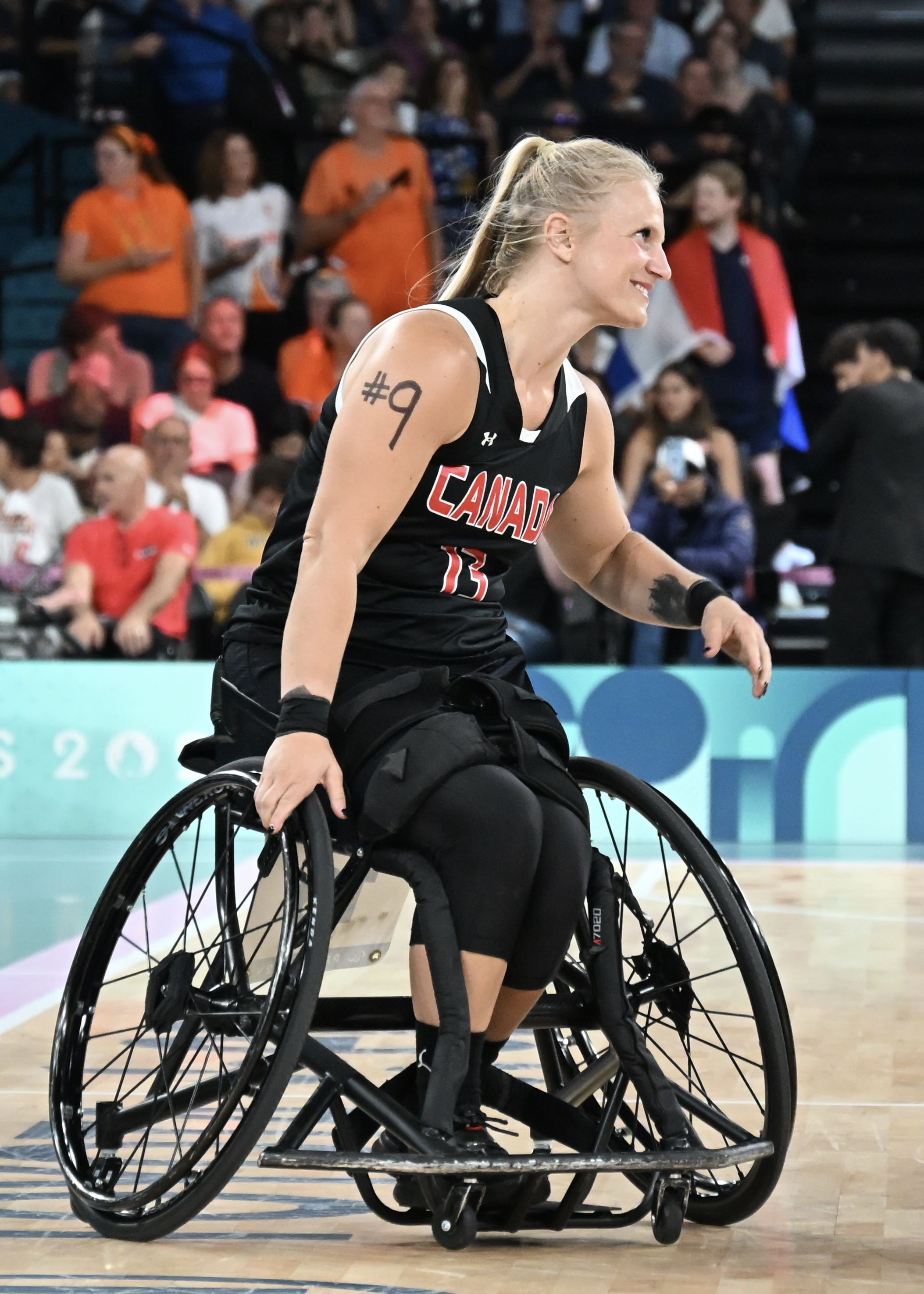
- Team Canada No. 13 – Kady Dandeneau

Personal information
- Nationality: Canada
- Born: January 25, 1990 (age 36) Pender Island, British Columbia
- Height: 5 ft 9 in (1.75 m)

Sport
- Sport: Wheelchair basketball
- Disability class: 4.5
- Event: Women's team
- College team: UNBC Timberwolves
Medal record
Women's wheelchair basketball
Representing Canada
World Championship
| Silver medal – second place | 2026 Ottawa | Team |
Commonwealth Games
| Gold medal – first place | 2022 Birmingham | 3x3 |
Parapan American Games
| Gold medal – first place | 2019 Lima | Team |
| Silver medal – second place | 2023 Santiago | Team |

Kady Dandeneau (born January 25, 1990) is a Canadian 4.5 point wheelchair basketball player. In 2018, she was part of the Canadian national women's team for the 2018 Wheelchair Basketball World Championship in Hamburg.

== Career ==
Kady Dandeneau was born in Pender Island, British Columbia, on January 25, 1990. She began playing basketball for the University of Northern British Columbia Timberwolves in 2007/08. On January 23, 2010, with an average of 18.3 points per game, she was leading scorer in the BC Colleges Athletic Association, when she collided with an opposition player and suffered what was later determined to most likely have been a partial tear in her anterior cruciate ligament (ACL). This caused her to miss the next five games, but she returned for the last two games of the season, wearing a brace, and shooting an impressive 26 points in the final match. Then, during practice before the playoffs, she re-injured her knee. It was subsequently determined that this time she had torn her ACL completely, damaged her medial collateral ligament, and fractured her femur. After missing the 2010/11 season, she returned to play in 2011/12 and 2012/13, but was no longer the player she was, playing on just one knee. She had four operations on her knee, but developed a bone defect as a result of fracture in the femur.

In 2015, Dandeneau was introduced to wheelchair basketball by the former Canadian national women's team coach, Tim Frick. She played for the BC Breakers and the BC Royals. In 2017, she was part of the national team at the Americas Cup in Cali, Colombia, where Team Canada was placed first. In August 2018, she was part of Team Canada at the 2018 Wheelchair Basketball World Championship in Hamburg.
