= Arinn Young =

Canadian wheelchair basketball player

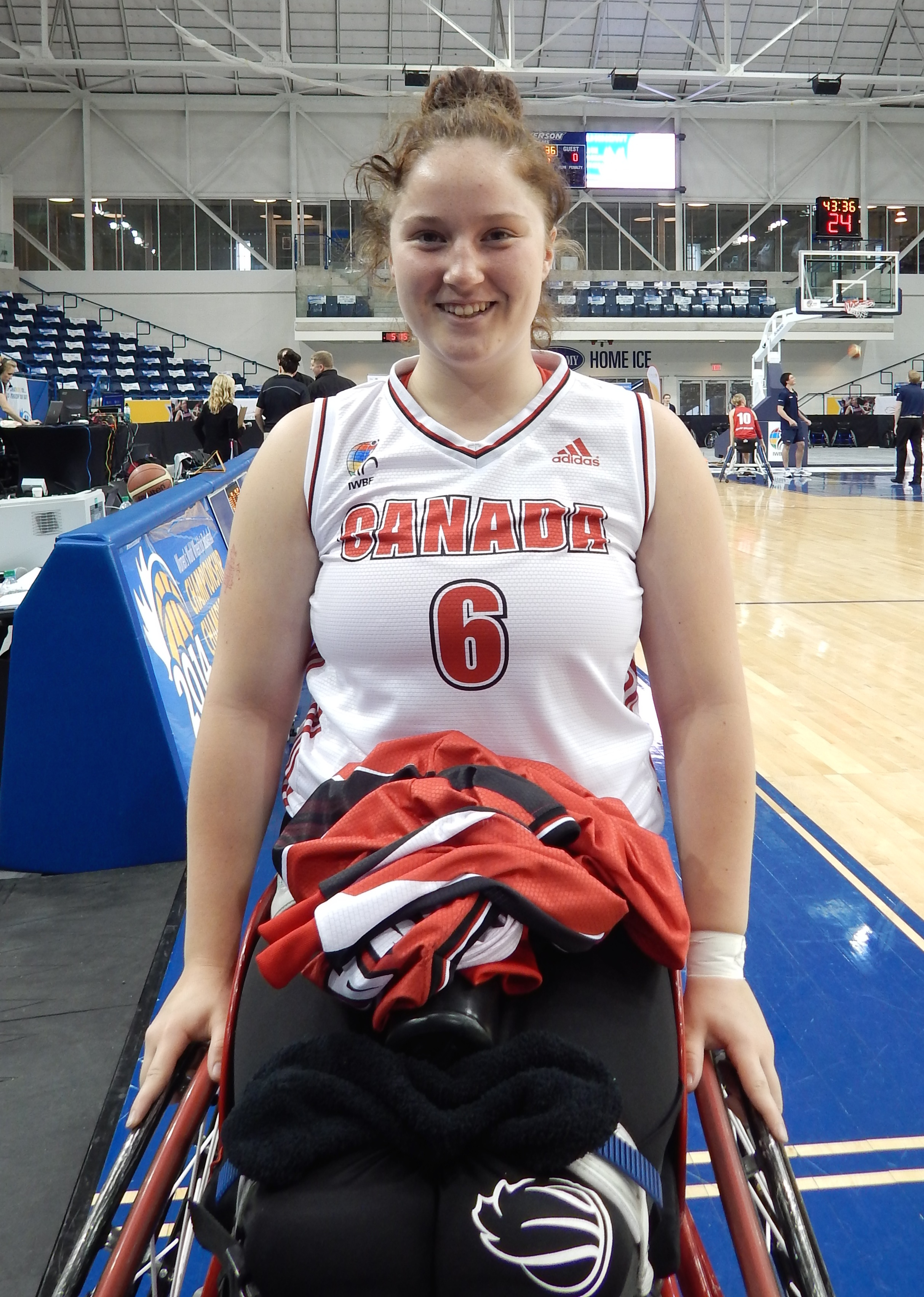
- Team Canada – No 6 – Arinn Young

Personal information
- Born: July 10, 1996 (age 30) St. Albert, Alberta
- Height: 5 ft 8 in (173 cm)

Sport
- Country: Canada
- Sport: Wheelchair basketball
- Disability class: 4.5
- Event: Women's team
- Team: Edmonton Inferno
Medal record
Women's wheelchair basketball
Representing Canada
World Championship
Gold medal – first place	2014 Toronto	Team
Silver medal – second place	2026 Ottawa	Team
Parapan American Games
Gold medal – first place	2019 Lima	Team
Silver medal – second place	2015 Toronto	Team
Silver medal – second place	2023 Santiago	Team

Arinn Young (born July 10, 1996) is a Canadian 4.5 point wheelchair basketball player who won a gold medal at the 2014 Women's World Wheelchair Basketball Championship in Toronto.

== Biography ==
Arinn Young was born in St. Albert, Alberta, on July 10, 1996. She is nicknamed "Juice" due to her practice of drinking juice boxes during a game. She started playing basketball when she was five years old, and went on to win 15 MVP awards and two city championships. She also played other sports, including lacrosse and horse riding, and was placed third in shot-put at the Alberta Track and Field Provincial Championship.

An injury while playing lacrosse when she was 14 saw her right knee swell up. It apparently returned to normal but "popped" a number of times over the following year. An MRI revealed an anterior cruciate ligament injury. Her meniscus was damaged and her femur, patella and fibula were bone on bone, which causes accelerated wear on the bones. A series of surgical procedures followed. She continued playing basketball with the Morinville Community High School Lady Wolves until 2013, when she severely injured her good knee in the opening game at the North Central Zone Tournament.

Young was introduced to wheelchair basketball by Max MacMillan, a friend of her father's and a wheelchair basketball coach whose daughter played the sport. Able to walk normally, Young is classified as a 4.5 point player.

She began playing for the Edmonton Inferno in 2012, placing fourth in the Canadian Wheelchair Basketball League Women's National Championship in Richmond, British Columbia, and finished first in the Canadian Women's Championship in Edmonton in 2013. In 2013, she was named to the All Star Five. She joined the U25 national team in 2013, and made her international debut with the senior women's team as the youngest player on the team at the 2014 Women's World Wheelchair Basketball Championship in Toronto in July 2014, winning a gold medal. She won silver at the 2015 Parapan American Games in August 2015.

Statistics
Competition	Season	Matches	FGM-A	FG%	3PM-A	3P%	FTM-A	FT%	OR-DR	AST	PTS	Source
World Championships	2014	3	7-15	46.7	0-0	0	0-1	0	2-9	1	14	

Key
FGM, FGA, FG%: field goals made, attempted and percentage	3PM, 3PA, 3P%: three-point field goals made, attempted and percentage
FTM, FTA, FT%: free throws made, attempted and percentage	OR, DR: offensive, defensive rebounds
PTS: points	AST: assists
