= 2019 Women's U25 Wheelchair Basketball World Championship =

- Venue: Suphanburi Indoor Stadium
- Location: Suphanburi, Thailand
- Start date: 23 May 2019
- End date: 27 May 2019
- Competitors: 8 teams from 8 nations

The 2019 Women's U25 Wheelchair Basketball World Championship was held at the Suphanburi Indoor Stadium in Thailand, from 23 to 27 May 2019. It was the third wheelchair basketball world championship for women in the under-25 age category. Eight nations competed: Australia, Germany, Great Britain, Japan, Thailand, South Africa, Turkey and the United States. The event took the form of a round-robin tournament, with each team playing all the other teams once. The eight teams then went into quarter-finals, while the bottom two played each other for world ranking. The winners of the semi-finals faced each other in the final, while the losers played for bronze. The competition was won by the United States, with Australia taking silver and Great Britain claiming bronze.

== Competition ==
The 2019 Women's U25 Wheelchair Basketball World Championship was the third wheelchair basketball world championship for women in the under-25 age category. The event is held every four years; it was previously held in St. Catharines, Ontario, Canada, in 2011, and in Beijing, China, in 2015. Thailand was chosen as the host in November 2018.

Eight nations competed: Australia, Germany, Great Britain, Japan, Thailand, South Africa, Turkey and the United States. The teams were divided into two pools. A draw ceremony was conducted in Bangkok on 1 April 2019, presided over by Ulf Mehrens, the President of the International Wheelchair Basketball Federation (IWBF), and Chutinant Bhirombhakdi, the President of the Paralympic Committee of Thailand. Great Britain, Japan, South Africa and Thailand were assigned to Pool A, and Australia, Germany, Turkey and the United States to Pool B. The competition format called for the teams to play each team in their pool. Based on the rankings, they then played a finals series. Because there was only eight teams, all advanced to the quarter-finals. The schedule was released in April 2019.

== Venue ==
The event was held at the Suphanburi Indoor Stadium, a 4,000-seat stadium in the heart of Suphanburi.

== Teams ==
=== Australia ===
Head Coach: Stephen Charlton
Assistant Coach: Sarah Graham
Assistant/Technical: Dave Hegerty
Physiotherapist: Bonnie Kerr
Team Manager: Jane Kyle
Physiologist: Steph Shell

| # | Name | Class. |
|---|---|---|
| 4 | Mary Friday | 1.0 |
| 5 | Jessica Cronje | 4.0 |
| 6 | Lauren Hardbottle | 4.0 |
| 7 | Maryanne Latu | 2.5 |
| 8 | Georgia Bishop-Cash | 4.0 |
| 9 | Isabel Martin | 1.0 |
| 10 | Teisha Shadwell | 4.5 |
| 11 | Taishar Ovens | 1.0 |
| 12 | Sarah King | 3.0 |
| 13 | Annabelle Lindsay | 4.5 |
| 14 | Victoria Simpson | 1.0 |

Source: "Australia". 2019 Women's U25 World Championships.

=== South Africa ===
Head Coach: Nthombizile Nthombeni
Assistant Coach: James Mthethwa
Team Manager: Gerhard Smith
Sport Massage: Kate Douglas
Second Assistant Coach: Wiseman Dlamini
Chef De Mission: Charles Saunders

| # | Name | Class. |
|---|---|---|
| 4 | Aviwe Ngoni | 1.0 |
| 5 | Samkelisiwe Mbatha | 2.0 |
| 6 | Tshwanelo Moabi | 1.0 |
| 7 | Lungile Ndlela | 2.5 |
| 8 | Emihle Mbotho | 3.5 |
| 9 | Nolitha Kibido | 3.5 |
| 10 | Ongezwa Hagu | 4.0 |
| 11 | Nokuthula Yonke | 3.5 |
| 12 | Asive Gilifile | 4.0 |
| 13 | Nokwanda Hlongwane | 4.5 |
| 14 | Duduzile Mceleni | 4.5 |
| 15 | Simphiwe Manqele | 4.5 |

Source: "South Africa". 2019 Women's U25 World Championships.

=== Germany ===
Trainer: Dennis Nohl
Assistant Trainer: Marina Mohnen
Physical Therapist: Franziska Vogel
Physiotherapist: Mathis Garvels
Team Doctor: Leutheuser
Technician: Marie Scheidemann

| # | Name | Class. |
|---|---|---|
| 4 | Svenja Erni | 3.5 |
| 5 | Anna-Lena Hennig | 2.5 |
| 6 | Catharina Weiẞ | 1.0 |
| 7 | Anne-Sophie Risse | 4.5 |
| 8 | Lisa Bergenthal | 4.0 |
| 9 | Sarah Heibutzki | 2.0 |
| 10 | Anna Jansen | 2.5 |
| 11 | Martha Schuren | 2.5 |
| 13 | Valeska Finger | 2.5 |
| 15 | Rebecca Lieb | 3.5 |

Source: "Germany". 2019 Women's U25 World Championships.

=== Thailand ===
Head Coach: Ali Arda Ozturk
Assistant Coach: Tawatchai Jaisin
Team Manager: Wootisak Pinwiset
Assistant Coach: Akapo Kunpradit
Assistant Coach: Erdener Atalan

| # | Name | Class. |
|---|---|---|
| 4 | Weerada Patitang | 1.0 |
| 5 | Ratree Tawongsa | 2.0 |
| 6 | Warisa Thamla-Aied | 3.0 |
| 7 | Pimjai Putthanoi | 2.0 |
| 8 | Saranjit Kohoudheng | 2.0 |
| 9 | Nuttaporn Lasopa | 3.5 |
| 10 | Saowalak Nanthasombat | 4.0 |
| 11 | Techinee Duang-In | 3.0 |
| 12 | Sabeeroh Leemoh | 4.5 |
| 14 | Thitirat Pengprasitthipong | 4.0 |
| 15 | Titinan Anongchai | 4.0 |

Source: "Thailand". 2019 Women's U25 World Championships.

=== Great Britain ===
Head Coach: Daniel Price
Assistant Coach: Simon Fisher
Team Manager: Rosie Williams
Physiotherapist: Laura Heathcote
Performance Analyst: Nathan Payne
Doctor: Andrew Hogg
Mechanic: Tanakom Sheepsomsong
Performance Director: Jayne Ellis

| # | Name | Class. |
|---|---|---|
| 4 | Charlotte Moore | 1.0 |
| 5 | Bethany Wheeler | 2.5 |
| 6 | Michaela Bell | 1.5 |
| 7 | Niamh Horan | 3.0 |
| 8 | Adele Atkin | 1.5 |
| 9 | Brooke Mottram | 3.0 |
| 10 | Jade Atkin | 4.5 |
| 11 | Madeleine Thompson | 4.0 |
| 12 | Freya Levy | 2.0 |
| 13 | Siobhan Fitzpatrick | 3.0 |
| 14 | Joy Haizelden | 2.5 |
| 15 | Lucy Robinson | 4.5 |

Source: "Great Britain". 2019 Women's U25 World Championships.

=== Turkey ===
Head Coach: Murat Saltan
Assistant Coach: Abdullah Bayram
Team-Manager: Önder Yurdagül
Physiotherapist: Ayça Uyan
Mechanic: Servet Ergün
Companion: Seyhan Candan

| # | Name | Class. |
|---|---|---|
| 5 | Hatice Atay | 3.5 |
| 6 | Serra Uzun | 2.5 |
| 7 | Öznur Koç | 4.0 |
| 8 | Meryem Tan | 4.0 |
| 9 | Hilal Eker | 4.5 |
| 10 | Ecem Nur Adiguzel | 1.0 |
| 11 | Ebru Çam | 1.0 |
| 13 | Begüm Pusat | 2.5 |
| 14 | Rabia Akyürek | 2.0 |
| 15 | Hacire Doğan | 1.0 |

Source: "Turkey". 2019 Women's U25 World Championships.

=== Japan ===
Head Coach: Sayaka Yamasaki
Assistant Coach: Erika Yoshida
Trainer: Jun Nomura
Trainer: Takumi Saito
Team Staff: Miho Yoshikawa
Analyst: Keigo Hirata
Interpreter: Nuriya Narita
Secretary General: Yurie Miyamoto

| # | Name | Class. |
|---|---|---|
| 2 | Izumi Zaima | 1.0 |
| 4 | Amane Yanagimoto | 2.5 |
| 6 | Kimi Yoshioka | 4.0 |
| 7 | Miwako Kanno | 4.5 |
| 10 | Hotaru Tatsuoka | 1.5 |
| 11 | Yuri Eguchi | 2.0 |
| 12 | Yui Ishikawa | 1.0 |
| 16 | Kotone Usui | 4.5 |
| 27 | Niina Okugawa | 1.0 |
| 31 | Moe Hatakeyama | 4.0 |
| 51 | Kanako Yamasaki | 4.5 |

Source: "Japan". 2019 Women's U25 World Championships.

=== United States ===
Head Coach: Lawerance "Trooper" Johnson
Assistant Coach: Melanie Brionez
Assistant Coach: Mieko Chambers
Team Manager: Trice Ham
Athletic Trainer: Karla Francioni

| # | Name | Class. |
|---|---|---|
| 1 | Alejandra Ibáñez | 2.5 |
| 7 | Josie Aslakson | 1.0 |
| 8 | Abigail Bauleke | 1.5 |
| 13 | Riley Ljungdahl | 1.0 |
| 15 | Rose Hollermann | 3.5 |
| 20 | Angelina Welfle | 3.0 |
| 22 | Elizabeth Becker | 1.0 |
| 23 | Abby Dunkin | 3.5 |
| 24 | Lindsey Zurbrugg | 2.5 |
| 34 | Emily Oberst | 4.5 |
| 43 | Bailey Moody | 4.0 |
| 54 | Ixhelt González | 4.5 |

Source: "United States". 2019 Women's U25 World Championships.

The South African team was named on 8 May. The team included many players who were new to the sport, and some had never traveled on a plane before. The team officials were under no illusions about the difficulty of winning games, but saw the tournament as an opportunity to build their wheelchair basketball program, with an eye to qualifying for the 2024 Summer Paralympics in Paris. Similarly, the Australian U25 team, known as the Devils, was unashamedly a development team, with only one of its eleven players being a member of the senior team, the Gliders: Annabelle Lindsay, who had played in the 2018 Wheelchair Basketball World Championship in Hamburg in 2018. Most of the youthful side would be eligible to play in the next U25 championship, and three would be eligible to play in the next three. In contrast, Team Great Britain regarded itself as a serious contender, having won in Beijing in 2015, and the U24 European Wheelchair Basketball Championship in 2016 and 2018. The team included five members of the senior team: Joy Haizelden, Maddie Thompson, Kayla Bell, Siobhan Fitzpatrick and Charlotte Moore.

== Preliminary round ==
23 May 2019
11:30

Report

| Thailand | 16–35 | South Africa |
Scoring by quarter: 3–5, 6–6, 3–14, 4–10
| Pts: Pattiang 4 Rebs: Lasopa 13; Asts: Lasopa 2 | | Pts: Mcelini 16; Rebs: Mcelini 8 Asts: Ngoni 5 |

Suphanburi Indoor Stadium

23 May 2019
13:45

Report

| Japan | 30–47 | Great Britain |
Scoring by quarter: 8–13, 6–11, 8–15, 8–8
| Pts: Zaima 10; Rebs: Usui 12; Asts: Usui 6 | | Pts: Thompson 18; Rebs: Thompson 13; Asts: Haizelden 9 |

Suphanburi Indoor Stadium

23 May 2019
16:00

Report

| Germany | 37–55 | Australia |
Scoring by quarter: 6–17, 9–14, 10–16, 12–8
| Pts: Weiss 10; Rebs: Hennig 5 Asts: Hennig 3 | | Pts: Lindsay 27; Rebs: Lindsay 12; Asts: Latu, Shadwell 4 |

Suphanburi Indoor Stadium

23 May 2019
18:15

Report

| Turkey | 16–70 | United States |
Scoring by quarter: 2–22, 4–18, 3–16, 7–14
| Pts: Tan 6 Rebs: Atay 7 Asts: Atay, Tan 1 | | Pts: Moody 16; Rebs: Moody 10; Asts: Dunkin, Moody 4 |

Suphanburi Indoor Stadium

24 May 2019
10:00

Report

| South Africa | 8–81 | Japan |
Scoring by quarter: 4–20, 0–14, 4–27, 0–20
| Pts: Mceleni 6 Rebs: Mceleni 8 Asts: Mceleni 1 | | Pts: Usui 23; Rebs: Usui 8 Asts: Yanigimoto 11 |

Suphanburi Indoor Stadium

24 May 2019
12:15

Report

| United States | 62–11 | Germany |
Scoring by quarter: 25–0, 14–0, 12–4, 11–7
| Pts: Gonzalez 16; Rebs: Moody 10; Asts: Aslakson 5 | | Pts: Lieb 3 Rebs: Lieb 7 Asts: Lieb, Finger 2 |

Suphanburi Indoor Stadium

24 May 2019
15:00

Report

| Australia | 53–24 | Turkey |
Scoring by quarter: 11–0, 20–12, 14–6, 8–6
| Pts: Shadwell 13; Rebs: Shadwell 9 Asts: Latu 5 | | Pts: Tan 16; Rebs: Atay 5 Asts: Atay 3 |

Suphanburi Indoor Stadium

24 May 2019
17:15

Report

| Great Britain | 73–10 | Thailand |
Scoring by quarter: 24–0, 18–2, 18–2, 13–6
| Pts: Robinson 14; Rebs: Wheeler 14; Asts: Haizelden 7 | | Pts: Lasopa 8 Rebs: Lasopa 7 Asts: Putthanoi 1 |

Suphanburi Indoor Stadium

25 May 2019
10:00

Report

| Germany | 46–24 | Turkey |
Scoring by quarter: 13–4, 4–12, 14–8, 15–0
| Pts: Lieb 15; Rebs: Schuren 7 Asts: Lieb 4 | | Pts: Tan 8 Rebs: Tan 11; Asts: Atay 3 |

Suphanburi Indoor Stadium

25 May 2019
12:15

Report

| Thailand | 4–47 | Japan |
Scoring by quarter: 0–19, 0–14, 2–10, 2–4
| Pts: Lasopa 3 Rebs: Nanthasombat 9 | | Pts: Yanagimoto 8 Rebs: Hatakeyama 6 Asts: Zaima 3 |

Suphanburi Indoor Stadium

25 May 2019
15:00

Report

| South Africa | 12–80 | Great Britain |
Scoring by quarter: 2–27, 2–21, 4–16, 4–16
| Pts: Ngoni 6 Rebs: Ndela, Mbatha 4 Asts: Ngoni 3 | | Pts: Atkin 20; Rebs: Fitzpatrick 9 Asts: Haizelden 6 |

Suphanburi Indoor Stadium

25 May 2019
17:15

Report

| United States | 56–31 | Australia |
Scoring by quarter: 20–4, 12–6, 12–14, 12–7
| Pts: Hollermann 14; Rebs: Zurbugg 7 Asts: Dunkin 6 | | Pts: Shadwell 11; Rebs: Lindsay 12; Asts: Lindsay 4 |

Suphanburi Indoor Stadium

The first day opened well for South Africa, which scored its first ever win in the competition, with a 16-35 win over the host nation. Team GB got off to a shaky start against Japan, but claimed a 47-30 win. The Devils performed well against Germany, with Lindsay racking up 27 points and 12 rebounds in a 55-37 win. On the final game of the day, the USA was too good for Turkey. On the second day, Japan notched up its first win, against South Africa; the USA had little trouble with Germany; the Devils held Turkey to a scoreless 11-0 first quarter before going on to post a second win; and Team GB coasted to an easy win against Thailand. On the third day, Germany defeated Turkey 46-24 to secure the third spot in Pool B, and Japan defeated Thailand to grab second place in Pool A. With another easy victory, this time 80-12 over South Africa, Team GB claimed the top spot in Pool A. The final game of the round was a fight for the top spot in Pool B between the Devils and the USA. The USA concentrated on shutting down Lindsay, who had been averaging 35 points per game. This time she scored only 10 points, but Teisha Shadwell also proved a threat, and ended the game with a double-double of 11 points and 12 rebounds. When the USA rotated its players, the Devils began to gain the upper hand, winning the third quarter by two points. In the end, the USA won 56-31, and, undefeated, secured the top place in Pool B.

== Standings at end of playoff round ==
=== Pool A ===
| Pos | Team | Pld | W | L | PF | PA | PD | Pts | Qualification |
|---|---|---|---|---|---|---|---|---|---|
| 1 | Great Britain | 3 | 3 | 0 | 200 | 52 | +148 | 6 | Quarter-finals |
| 2 | Japan | 3 | 2 | 1 | 158 | 59 | +99 | 5 | Quarter-finals |
| 3 | South Africa | 3 | 1 | 2 | 55 | 177 | −122 | 4 | Quarter-finals |
| 4 | Thailand | 3 | 0 | 3 | 30 | 155 | −125 | 3 | Quarter-finals |

Rules for classification: 1) Points; 2) Head-to-head results; 3) Points difference; 4) Points scored.

=== Pool B ===
| Pos | Team | Pld | W | L | PF | PA | PD | Pts | Qualification |
|---|---|---|---|---|---|---|---|---|---|
| 1 | United States | 3 | 3 | 0 | 188 | 58 | +130 | 6 | Quarter-finals |
| 2 | Australia | 3 | 2 | 1 | 139 | 117 | +22 | 5 | Quarter-finals |
| 3 | Germany | 3 | 1 | 2 | 94 | 141 | −47 | 4 | Quarter-finals |
| 4 | Turkey | 3 | 0 | 3 | 64 | 169 | −105 | 3 | Quarter-finals |

Rules for classification: 1) Points; 2) Head-to-head results; 3) Points difference; 4) Points scored.

== Finals ==
Quarter-finals
26 May
United States | 65
Thailand | 10
26 May
Japan | 42
Germany | 37
26 May
Great Britain | 70
Turkey | 15
26 May
Australia | 72
South Africa | 12

Semi-finals
27 May
United States | 78
Japan | 24
27 May
Great Britain | 36
Australia | 42

Gold medal
28 May
United States | 62
Australia | 25
Bronze medal
28 May
Great Britain | 63
Japan | 31

Quarter-Final 1

26 May 2019
10:00

Report

| Japan | 42–37 | Germany |
Scoring by quarter: 6–12, 10–5, 8–12, 18–8
| Pts: Yanagimoto 21; Rebs: Usui 17; Asts: Yanagimoto 4 | | Pts: Weiss 10; Rebs: Weiss 13; Asts: Burgenthal 9 |

Suphanburi Indoor Stadium

Quarter-Final 2

26 May 2019
12:15

Report

| Australia | 72–12 | South Africa |
Scoring by quarter: 24–8, 16–2, 18–0, 14–2
| Pts: Lindsay 32; Rebs: Lindsay 24; Asts: Latu 8 | | Pts: Mceleni 6 Rebs: Mceleni 9 Asts: Ngoni 2 |

Suphanburi Indoor Stadium

Quarter-Final 3

26 May 2019
15:00

Report

| United States | 65–10 | Thailand |
Scoring by quarter: 17–2, 14–2, 14–4, 20–2
| Pts: Gonzalez 14; Rebs: Oberst 8 Asts: Gonzalez 6 | | Pts: Lasopa 8 Rebs: Nanthasombat 9 Asts: Lasopa 1 |

Suphanburi Indoor Stadium

Quarter-Final 4

26 May 2019
17:15

Report

| Great Britain | 70–15 | Turkey |
Scoring by quarter: 21–6, 16–2, 18–5, 15–2
| Pts: Haizelden 16; Rebs: Fitzpatrick 8 Asts: Haizelden 9 | | Pts: Tan 7 Rebs: Tan 10; Asts: Atay 2 |

Suphanburi Indoor Stadium

5/8 Crossover 1

27 May 2019
10:00

Report

| Germany | 52–14 | Thailand |
Scoring by quarter: 17–4, 10–2, 9–1, 16–7
| Pts: Risse 19; Rebs: Schuren 9 Asts: Weiss 6 | | Pts: Lasopa 12; Rebs: Lasopa 12; Asts: Lasopa 1 |

Suphanburi Indoor Stadium

5/8 Crossover 2

27 May 2019
12:15

Report

| Turkey | 48–25 | South Africa |
Scoring by quarter: 10–7, 14–4, 22–4, 2–10
| Pts: Tan 24; Rebs: Tan 10; Asts: Atay 9 | | Pts: Mceleni 5 Rebs: Mceleni 7 Asts: Ngoni 4 |

Suphanburi Indoor Stadium

Semi-Final 1

27 May 2019
15:00

Report

| United States | 78–24 | Japan |
Scoring by quarter: 31–2, 20–7, 17–9, 10–6
| Pts: Hollermann 33; Rebs: Moody 13; Asts: Dunkin 10 | | Pts: Yanagimoto 9 Rebs: Yamasaki 9 Asts: Yanagimoto 3 |

Suphanburi Indoor Stadium

Semi-Final 2

27 May 2019
17:15

Report

| Great Britain | 36–42 | Australia |
Scoring by quarter: 10–14, 11–9, 8–10, 7–9
| Pts: Thompson 14; Rebs: Atkin 20; Asts: Haizelden 4 | | Pts: Lindsay 20; Rebs: Lindsay 26; Asts: Shadwell 9 |

Suphanburi Indoor Stadium

7th/8th place game

28 May 2019
10:00

Report

| South Africa | 26–19 | Thailand |
Scoring by quarter: 8–6, 8–2, 4–7, 6–4
| Pts: Mbatha 8 Rebs: Mbath 11; Asts: Ngoni 3 | | Pts: Thalma-Aied 12; Rebs: Nanthasombat 26; Asts: Nanthasombat 1 |

Suphanburi Indoor Stadium

5th/6th place game

28 May 2019
12:15

Report

| Germany | 60–13 | Turkey |
Scoring by quarter: 14–4, 16–4, 12–2, 18–3
| Pts: Erni 18; Rebs: Erni 10; Asts: Lieb 8 | | Pts: Atay 5 Rebs: Tan 11; Asts: Tan 3 |

Suphanburi Indoor Stadium

Bronze medal match

28 May 2019
15:00

Report

| Great Britain | 63–31 | Japan |
Scoring by quarter: 16–6, 14–6, 21–10, 12–9
| Pts: Haizelden 14; Rebs: Haizelden 12; Asts: Haizelden 16 | | Pts: Usui 11; Rebs: Usui 14; Asts: Yoshioka 4 |

Suphanburi Indoor Stadium

Gold medal match

28 May 2019
17:15

Report

| United States | 62–25 | Australia |
Scoring by quarter: 18–2, 18–2, 12–10, 14–11
| Pts: Hollermann 18; Rebs: Dunkin 5 Asts: Dunkin 6 | | Pts: Lindsay 13; Rebs: Lindsay 14; Asts: Lindsay 3 |

Suphanburi Indoor Stadium

In the quarter-finals, Japan staged a thrilling 18-8 final quarter fight back to defeat Germany 42-37. In a hard-fought match, Japan's pressure held Germany to a dismal 19 percent scoring efficiency, while Amane Yanagimoto racked up 21 points, and Kotone Usui had a double-double with 10 points and 17 rebounds. It was Japan's first ever quarter-final win, and ensured its highest ever ranking. For the Devils it would be their third semi-final appearance, with their place locked in with a 72-12 demolition of South Africa. Lindsay posted a double-double of 32 points and 24 rebounds, Georgia Bishop-Cash and Jess Cronje also posted double-doubles, and most of the rest of the team made the scoreboard. A brave Thailand held the USA to just 31 points at half time, its lowest half-time score of the tournament, but could not stop them, and the USA went into the semi-finals undaunted, posting a final score of 65-10. In the last quarter-final, Team GB defeated Turkey 70-15, with four players scoring in the double digits.

In the crossover games, Germany bounced back from its defeat by Japan to defeat Thailand 52-14, and Turkey celebrated its first ever win, a 48-25 victory over South Africa. In the first semi-final, the USA beat Japan 78-24. In the second, the Devils came up against the undefeated Team GB. Both sides subjected the other to intense defensive pressure, with Team GB forcing the Devils into a series of eight second violations. Maddie Thompson was pulled off after she racked up three personal fouls, and the British defence struggled with height of Lindsay and Shadwell. A three-point buzzer beater from Joy Haizelden left Team GB just two points down at half time, but the Devils pushed their lead out to four points by three quarter time. Team GB's press forced multiple turnovers, but the Devils' pressure caused Team GB to miss many shots, and they ended with an average shooting accuracy of just 22 percent. In the end, Team GB's undefeated run ended, and the Devils were into the final with a 42-36 win.

South Africa won the 7th/8th place game against Thailand, Germany defeated Turkey in the 5th/6th place game, and Team GB rallied after its defeat by the Devils to claim the bronze medal with a win over Japan. In the anticlimactic final game, Lindsay lined up against five of her team mates from the University of Texas at Arlington Lady Movin' Mavs wheelchair basketball team: Nina Welfle, Rose Hollermann, Abby Dunkin, Josie Aslakson and Elizabeth Becker. The USA were too good, posting a 62-25 win. It was the USA's second win, and the Devil's third silver in a row.

== MVP and All Stars ==
The 2019 Women’s U25 World Championship All-Star Five was announced at the closing banquet on the final night of the tournament at the Songphanburi Hotel, in Suphanburi. The All-Star Five is made up of the best 1 point player, 2 point player, 3 point player and 4 point player, plus the Most Valuable Player of the Tournament, as voted by their fellow competitors.

=== All Star Five ===
- Catharina Weiss (1.0) (GER)
- Joy Haizelden (2.5) (GBR)
- Abby Dunkin (3.5) (USA)
- Annabelle Lindsay (4.5) (AUS)

=== Most Valuable Player ===
- Rose Hollermann (3.5) (USA)
