= Atay =

Atay (IPA: [aˈtaj]) is a masculine Turkish given name and a surname. It is spelled as Atai in some cultures.

Notable people with the name include:

== Given name ==
- Atay Aktuğ, Turkish footballer, former president of the Turkish football club Trabzonspor
- Atay Dzhumashev (born 1998), Kyrgyzstani footballer

== Surname ==
- Ali Atay (born 1976), Turkish actor, musician, screenwriter, and director
- Barış Atay (born 1981), Turkish actor and politician
- Falih Rıfkı Atay (1894–1971), Turkish journalist, writer and politician
- Hatice Atay (born 1996), Turkish female wheelchair basketball and para-badminton player
- Oğuz Atay (1934–1977), Turkish writer
- Dely Atay-Atayan (1914–2004), Filipina comedian

== Fictional characters ==
- Cengiz Atay, main villain of Turkish crime drama Ezel
- Can Atay, son of Cengiz and Eyşan Atay of Turkish crime drama Ezel
- Eyşan Atay, wife of Cengiz Atay and girlfriend of Ezel "Ömer" of Turkish crime drama Ezel

== Mythology ==
- Atai Ulaan or Atay Han, Buryat mythological figure

== See also ==
- Atay, Toguz-Toro, village in Jalal-Abad Region of Kyrgyzstan
- Nsit-Atai, local Government Area of Akwa Ibom State, Nigeria
