= Abby Dunkin =

American wheelchair basketball player

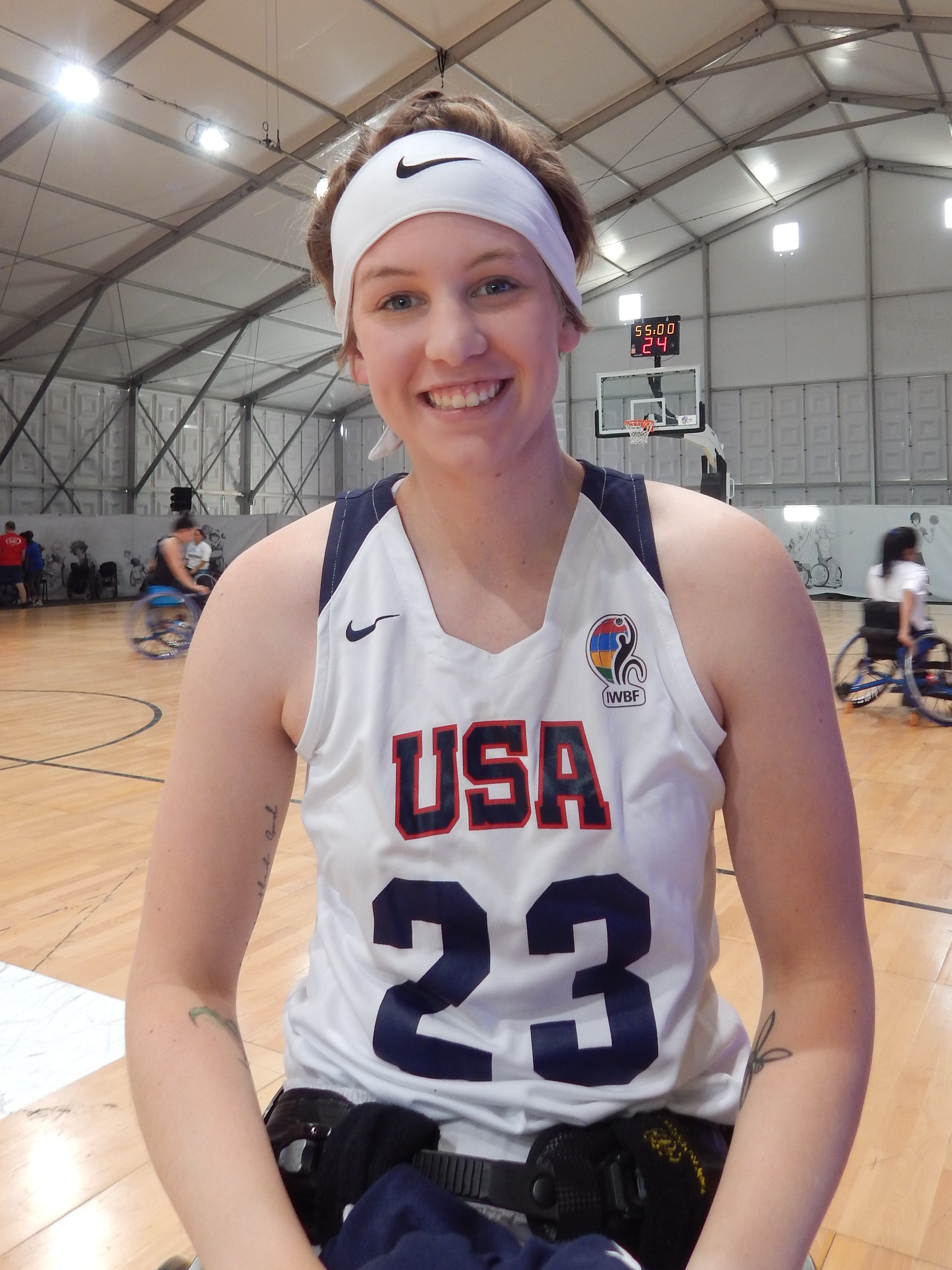
- Dunkin in 2018

Personal information
- Born: November 24, 1995 (age 30) Rota, Andalusia, Spain
- Height: 5'10

Sport
- Country: United States
- Sport: Wheelchair basketball
- Disability class: 3.5
- Event: Women's team
- College team: University of Texas at Arlington
Medal record
Wheelchair basketball
Parapan American Games
Gold medal – first place	2015 Toronto, Canada	Women's wheelchair basketball
Paralympic Games
Gold medal – first place	2016 Rio de Janeiro	Women's wheelchair basketball
U25 Women's World Championships
Gold medal – first place	2019 Suphanburi, Thailand	Women's wheelchair basketball

Abigail Dunkin (born November 24, 1995) is an American 3.5 point wheelchair basketball player who won gold at the 2015 Parapan American Games in Toronto, Canada, the 2016 Paralympics in Rio de Janeiro, Brazil, and the 2019 Women's U25 Wheelchair Basketball World Championship in Suphanburi, Thailand.

== Early life ==
Abby Dunkin was born on November 24, 1995, in Rota, Andalusia, Spain, but considers New Braunfels, Texas, to be her home town.

When Dunkin was 13 years old, she was diagnosed with complex regional pain syndrome, a brain disorder that causes abnormal pain. She played basketball and was a second degree black belt in martial arts. She continued to play sports despite the pain. In February 2013, she went to North Texas for treatment. She was told that she could never play basketball again, get a tattoo, or consume caffeine. On February 27, 2013, Dunkin woke up unable to walk properly and became dependent on a wheelchair. The condition was subsequently re-diagnosed as neurocardiogenic syncope dysautonomia with small fiber neuropathy. She became depressed and addicted to prescription painkillers, once experienced an overdose.

== Sport career ==
Dunkin competed in track and field athletics at Comal Canyon High School, winning wheelchair 100 metres, 400 metres and shot put events. She discovered wheelchair basketball watching videos of the sport at the 2012 Paralympic Games in London on YouTube. She trained with military veterans and the San Antonio ParaSport Spurs. After six months of playing with the men, she was recruited by the University of Texas at Arlington to play for their new Lady Movin' Mavs wheelchair basketball team. The Lady Movin' Mavs went on to win their first national title in 2016, defeating the top-seeded University of Illinois team 65–51 in the National Wheelchair Basketball Association intercollegiate tournament in Edinboro, Pennsylvania.

In January 2015, after only a few months with the Lady Movin' Mavs, Dunkin was invited to try out for the national team. She was selected for the team, which won gold at the 2015 Parapan American Games in Toronto, Canada. In 2016, she was part of the USA team at the 2016 Rio Paralympics, winning a Paralympic gold medal. She was one of a small number of openly gay athletes at the games. Dunkin continued to play with the Movin Mavs. On 17 March 2018, they capped off an undefeated season by beating their arch-rivals, the University of Alabama 65–55 to win the national championship.

In 2018, Dunkin was one of three UTA students selected for the national team at the 2018 Wheelchair Basketball World Championship in Hamburg, Germany, where Team USA came sixth. On 16 March 2019, the Movin' Mavs once again faced the University of Alabama in the national championship final, but this time fell short, losing 87–76 in extra time. In May 2019 she won a gold medal with the U25 Women's side at the 2019 Women's U25 Wheelchair Basketball World Championship in Suphanburi, Thailand. Team USA defeated Australia in the final 62–25. Dunkin was selected as one of the All-Star Five, along with Movin' Mav teammates Rose Hollermann and Annabelle Lindsay.
