= Rose Hollermann =

American wheelchair basketball player

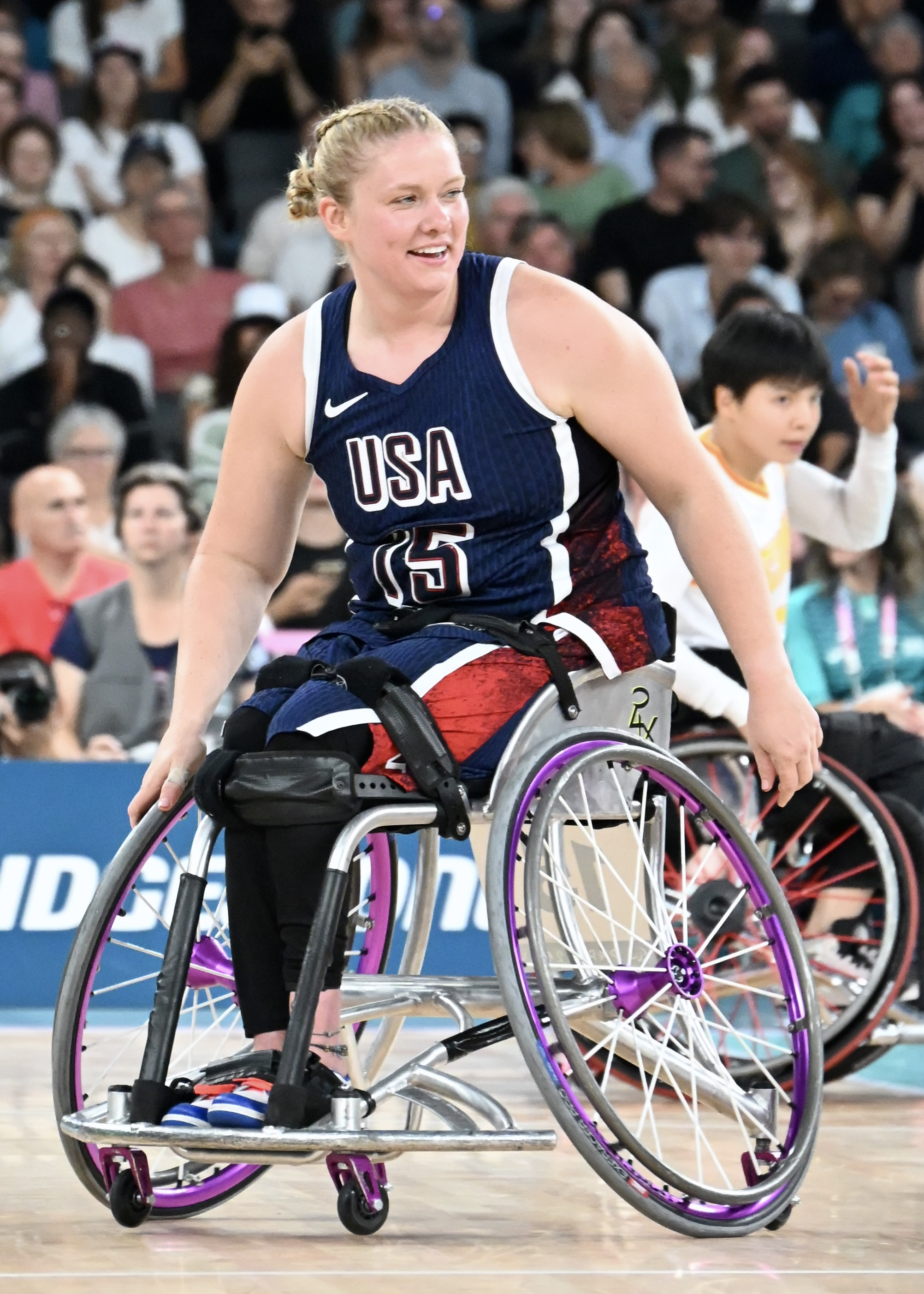
- At the 2024 Summer Paralympics in Paris

Personal information
- Full name: Rose Marie Hollermann
- Born: December 25, 1995 (age 30) Mankato, Minnesota, U.S.
- Home town: Elysian, Minnesota, U.S.
- Height: 5 ft 8 in (173 cm)

Sport
- Sport: Wheelchair basketball
- Disability class: 3.5
- College team: University of Texas at Arlington
- Coached by: Christina Schwab
Medal record
Women's wheelchair basketball
Representing United States
Paralympic Games
Gold medal – first place	2016 Rio de Janeiro	Team
Silver medal – second place	2024 Paris	Team
Bronze medal – third place	2020 Tokyo	Team
World Championship
Gold medal – first place	2026 Ottawa	Team
Bronze medal – third place	2022 Dubai	Team
Parapan American Games
Gold medal – first place	2011 Guadalajara	Team
Gold medal – first place	2015 Toronto	Team
Gold medal – first place	2023 Santiago	Team
U25 Women's World Championships
Gold medal – first place	2011 St. Catharines	Team
Gold medal – first place	2019 Suphanburi	Team

Rose Marie Hollermann (born December 25, 1995) is an American 3.5 point wheelchair basketball player and member of the United States women's national wheelchair basketball team. She who won gold at the 2011, and 2019 Women's U25 Wheelchair Basketball World Championship, the 2011, 2015 and 2023 Parapan American Games, and the 2016 Summer Paralympics. She also won bronze at the 2020 Summer Paralympics and the 2022 Wheelchair Basketball World Championships.

== Early life ==
Rose Hollermann was born in Mankato, Minnesota, on December 25, 1995, the daughter of John and Michelle Hollermann. She had three brothers: Shane, Ethan, and Seth.

On August 10, 2001, Rose, her mother and three brothers were in a motor vehicle accident outside their home in Elysian, Minnesota. Her two older brothers Ethan and Shane were killed. She had bruising to her spinal cord around the T11 and T12 thoracic vertebrae, leaving her partly paralyzed from the waist down. She can stand, and walk a little, but spends much of her time in a wheelchair.

After the accident, she was sent to the Courage Center in Minnesota, where swimming was part of her therapy. Soon she was swimming competitively. She also took to sled hockey, archery, tennis, cross-country skiing, and track and field sports, including discus, shot put, and distance races while at Waterville-Elysian-Morristown High School. Then she discovered wheelchair basketball, playing with the Courage Center Rolling Timberwolves. In this sport, in which she is classified a 3.5 point player, she was a National Junior champion in 2008, 2009 and 2010. She won a gold medal in 2010 at the U20 World Championship, and then another at the 2011 Women's U25 Wheelchair Basketball World Championship in St. Catharines, Canada.

== Career ==
In 2011, Hollermann became the youngest person to ever make the national team, and won a gold medal at the 2011 Parapan American Games in Guadalajara, Mexico. The following year she made her Paralympic debut at the 2012 London Paralympics. In 2014 the University of Texas at Arlington (UTA) awarded her a full athletic scholarship to play on its new Lady Movin' Mavs wheelchair basketball team. She won gold again at the 2015 Parapan American Games in Toronto, Canada. The Lady Movin' Mavs won their first national title in 2016, defeating the top-seeded University of Illinois team 65–51 in the National Wheelchair Basketball Association intercollegiate tournament in Edinboro, Pennsylvania. Hollermann, who contributed 35 points, nine rebounds and seven assists, was named the 2015–16 NWBA Collegiate Player of the Year. In 2016, still the youngest player on the USA team, she won gold at the 2016 Rio Paralympics.

Hollermann continued to play with the Movin' Mavs. On March 17, 2018, they capped off an undefeated season by beating their arch-rivals, the University of Alabama 65–55 to win the national championship. In 2018, she was one of three UTA students selected for the national team at the 2018 Wheelchair Basketball World Championship in Hamburg, Germany, where Team USA came sixth.

On March 16, 2019, the Movin' Mavs once again faced the University of Alabama in the national championship final, but this time fell short, losing 82–76 in extra time. In May 2019 she won a gold medal with the U25 Women's side at the 2019 Women's U25 Wheelchair Basketball World Championship in Suphanburi, Thailand. Team USA defeated Australia in the final 62–25. She was selected as one of the All-Star Five, along with her Movin' Mav teammates Abby Dunkin and Annabelle Lindsay.

She represented the United States at the 2022 Wheelchair Basketball World Championships and won a bronze medal.

In November 2023 she competed at the 2023 Parapan American Games in the wheelchair basketball tournament and won a gold medal. As a result, the team earned an automatic bid to the 2024 Summer Paralympics. On March 30, 2024, she was named to Team USA's roster to compete at the 2024 Summer Paralympics.
