= Atai =

Atai may refer to:

- Ataï, a Kanak grand chef killed in the 1878 rebellion in New Caledonia
- Ataí, Maghrebi mint tea
- Atai (chieftain), a Manchu chieftain; see Giocangga
- Atai Ulaan, a Buryat mythological figure
- Atai River, a source for the Bhairab River
- Golineh Atai (born 1974), German journalist
- Koita Atai (born 1983), Papua New Guinean cricketer
- Simon Atai (born 1999), Papua New Guinean cricketer
- Wife of Abassi in Efik mythology
- An alternative spelling of Atay, a Turkic name
- A Japanese pronoun
- Atai Mons, a mons on the planet Venus named for the spirit Atai

== See also ==
- atai Life Sciences
- Nsit-Atai, local government area of Akwa Ibom State, Nigeria
