= Segeen Sebdeg =

Segeen Sebdeg, the 3rd of the 55 tenger of the western skies, is the Buryat god of winter, and "is married to Ugan Sesen ... ("first wisdom")". Their daughter Sesegen Nogoon (goddess of the spring season) married Zasa Mergen Baatar.

Another daughter of Segeen Sebdeg was Naran Gohoon ('Sun Beauty'), who was made sick by Atai Ulaan when he was refused to him in marriage by her father.

Segeen Sebdeg's eldest "son has a fiery eye on the top of his head and a single tooth."

== Bibliography ==
- Sarangerel (Julie Ann Stewart) : Chosen by the Spirits : Following Your Shamanic Calling. Destiny Books, Rochester (VT), 2001.
- Gábor Klaniczay (ed.) : DEMONS, SPIRITS, WITCHES, Vol. 2 = Christian Demonology and Popular Mythology. Central European University Press, 2006.
