= UT Arlington Mavericks men's wheelchair basketball =

College team representing the University of Texas at Arlington

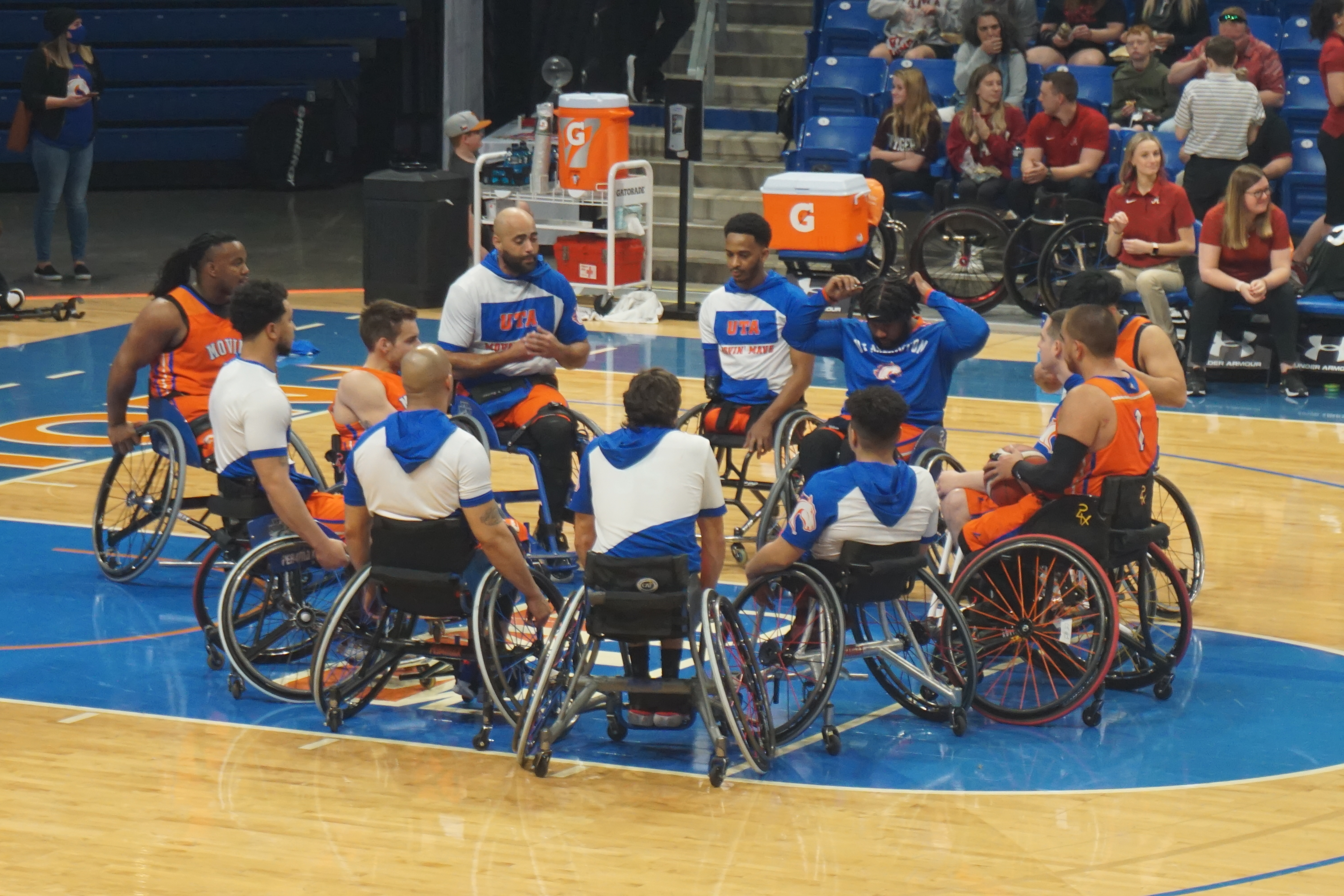
The Movin' Mavs in a huddle before the 2022 National Intercollegiate Wheelchair Basketball Tournament Men's Championship

The UT Arlington Movin' Mavs men's wheelchair basketball team, previously known as the UTA Freewheelers, is the men's college wheelchair basketball team representing the University of Texas at Arlington (UTA). Established in 1976 as the UTA Freewheelers, the team played at the club level against other colleges and universities in Texas during the 1970s and 1980s. It has played under the auspices of the National Wheelchair Basketball Association (NWBA) since 1988, when the team was renamed the Movin' Mavs. Its inaugural coach, from 1976 until 2008, was Jim Hayes. The team was coached by Doug Garner from 2008 until 2022 when he retired. In fall of 2022, Aaron Gouge was hired as the new head coach for the team.

The Movin' Mavs have won ten National Intercollegiate Wheelchair Basketball Tournament (NIWBT) national championships: 1991, 1992, 1993, 1994, 1997, 2002, 2006, 2017, 2021 and 2022. The program has produced over 25 Paralympians from 1992 to present.

== History ==
=== UTA Freewheelers ===
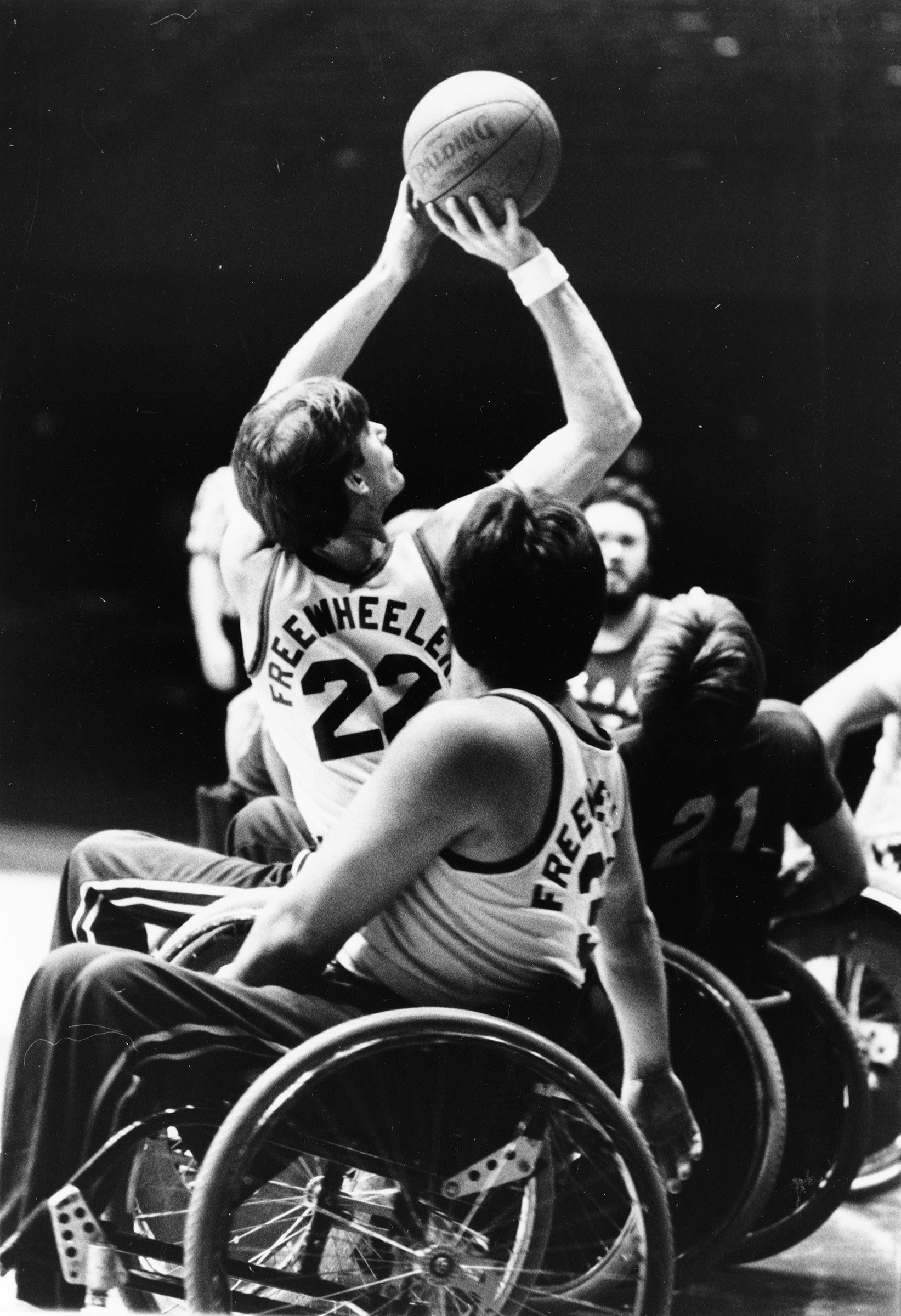
The UTA Freewheelers in action, undated

The Freewheelers were founded in 1976 at the University of Texas at Arlington (UTA) by Jim Hayes. That year, Hayes also founded and began serving as the inaugural director of UTA's Office for Students with Disabilities. He formed the wheelchair basketball team to "get disabled students out of their rut". The first Freewheelers team had six players, including both UTA students and staff, with Hayes as a player-coach. In 1977, the Freewheelers won one of their first games against the Houston Cougars men's wheelchair basketball team. While the Freewheelers did not have enough players to achieve intercollegiate status, they played as a club team against other colleges and universities in Texas during the 1970s and 1980s. They also played intrasquad games, and by 1987 had enough players to form four separate teams.

=== Movin' Mavs under Jim Hayes ===
In 1988, the UTA Freewheelers joined the National Wheelchair Basketball Association (NWBA) and changed their name to the Movin' Mavs. The name "Movin' Mavs" was suggested by former UTA men's basketball coach Snake LeGrand. In 1991, the team won its first intercollegiate division national championship, defeating the Wisconsin–Whitewater Warhawks, 58–48. Led by All-Americans Steve Welch, Jesus Alamillio, Willie Hernandez, Jason Van Beek, and Javier Gonzalez, the Movin' Mavs repeated as champions in 1992, 1993, and 1994, defeating the Illinois Fighting Illini in each of those three years. Following the 1993 championship, the Movin' Mavs became the first collegiate wheelchair basketball team to be official guests at the White House when President Bill Clinton invited them. The United States Congress also passed a resolution congratulating the team on winning their third straight national championship.

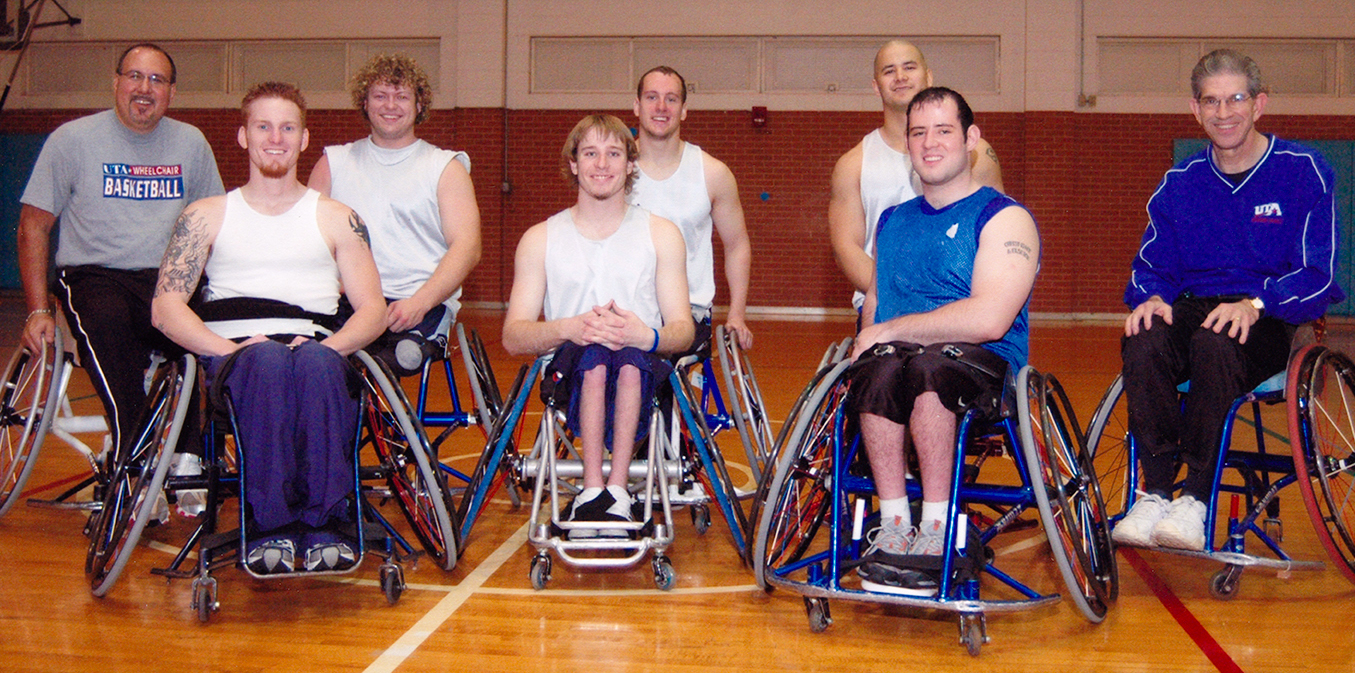
Movin' Mavs with UTA president James D. Spaniolo in 2006

Following their four straight championships, the Movin' Mavs lost in the championship game in 1995 and 1996, falling to Illinois, 55–53, and Wisconsin-Whitewater, 64–59, respectively. In 1997, UTA defeated Wisconsin–Whitewater, 59–46, en route to their fifth national title. The team fell to Illinois again in the 1998 championship, and then missed the title game for the first time since 1990 during the 1999 tournament. In 2000 and 2001, the Movin' Mavs returned to the national championship game, but lost both games to Illinois, both by eight points. From 2002 to 2006, the Movin' Mavs faced Wisconsin–Whitewater in the national championship game each year. They won in 2002 and 2006, 67–58 and 55–53, respectively, but lost in each of the three seasons between those two championships.

Under Hayes, 20 Movin' Mav players and alumni competed in the Paralympics. Seven UTA players were named most valuable player (MVP) of the NWBA's intercollegiate division: Steve Welch (1991, 1992), Rusty Belknap (1994, 1995), Jason Van Beek (1994), Donnie Keller (1996), Paul Schulte (1999, 2002), Mikey Paye (2006), and Aaron Gouge (2007). A total of 25 Movin' Mavs were named National Intercollegiate Wheelchair Basketball Tournament (NIWBT) first-team All-Americans.

Hayes coached the Movin' Mavs until his death in May 2008 at the age of 58. He was posthumously inducted into the NWBA Hall of Fame in March 2012.

=== Movin' Mavs under Doug Garner ===
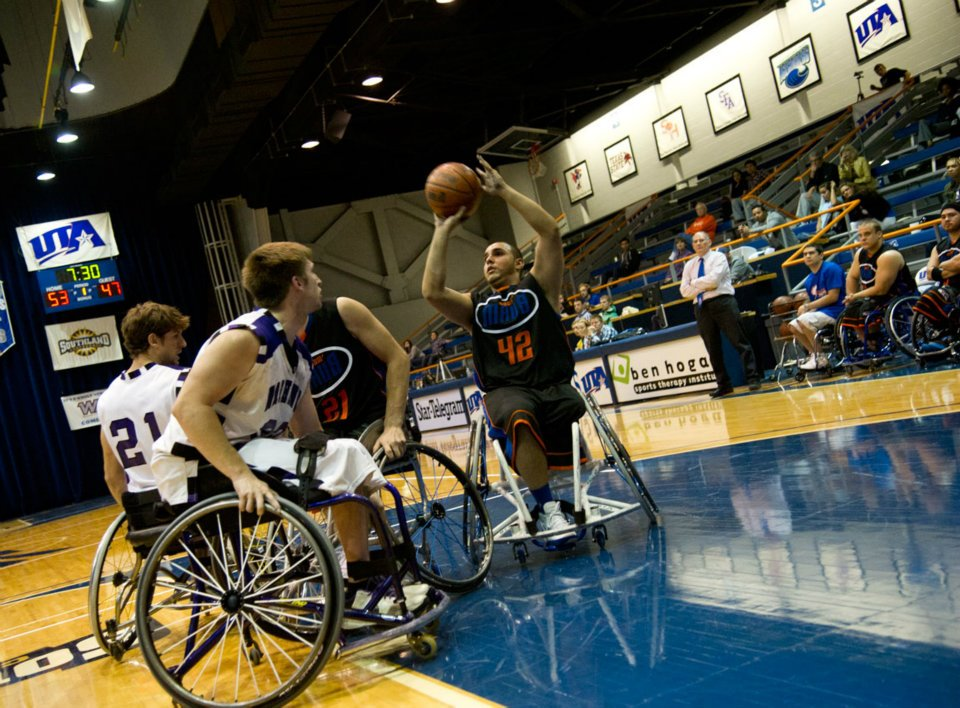
The Movin' Mavs in action at Texas Hall in 2011

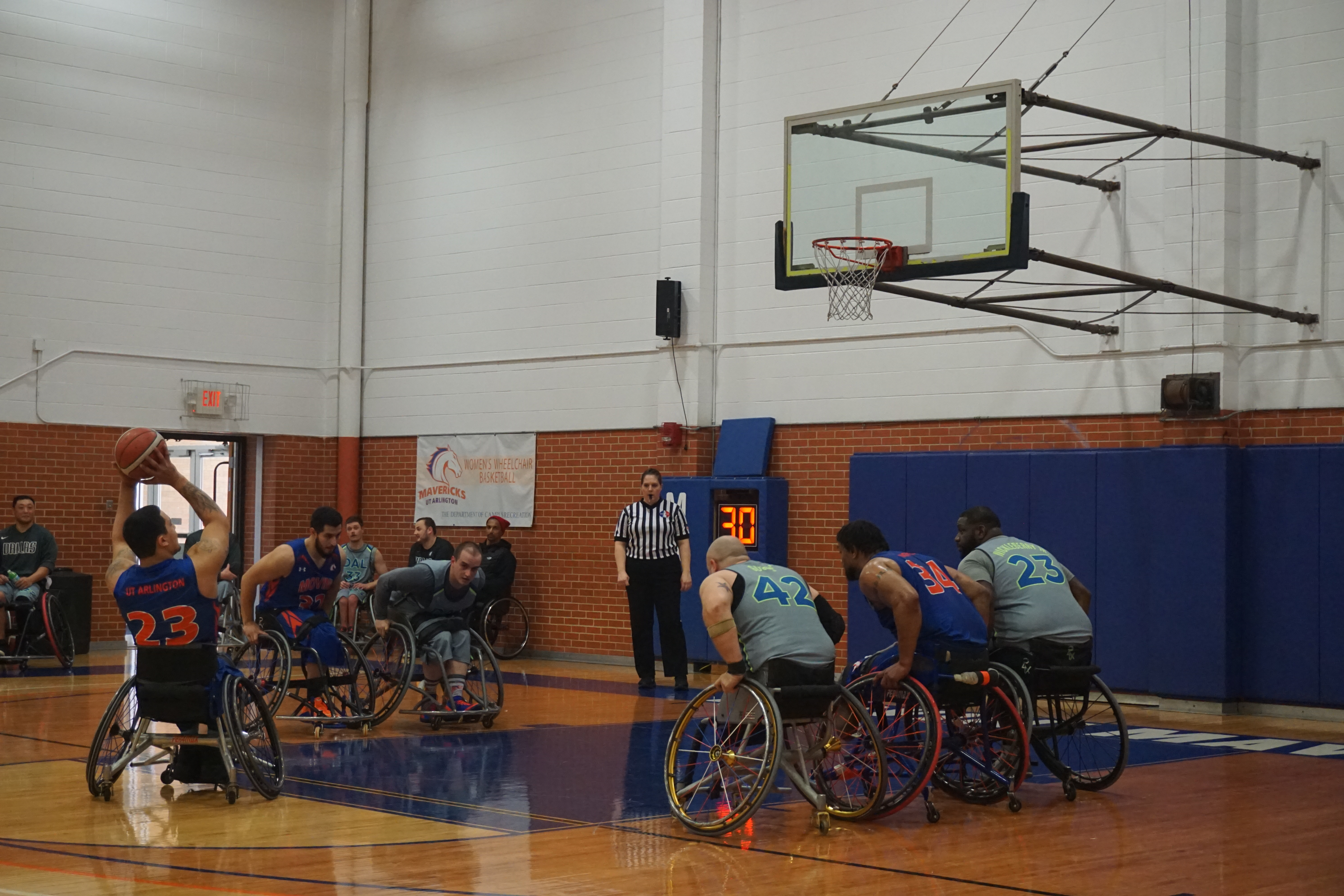
The Movin' Mavs in action against the Dallas Wheelchair Mavericks in 2020

In October 2008, assistant coach Doug Garner was named the second-ever head coach of the Movin' Mavs. He had arrived at UTA in 2007 as an assistant coach on the staff of Jim Hayes. In his first season as head coach, 2008–09, Garner and the Movin' Mavs finished with an 18–6 record and finished in third place at the 2009 NIWBT tournament in Whitewater, Wisconsin. In the 2009–10 season, the Movin' Mavs finished with a 27–7 record and another third-place finish at the 2010 NIWBT tournament in Marshall, Minnesota, beating the Alabama Crimson Tide in the third-place game. In March 2011, UTA hosted the 2011 NIWBT tournament at Texas Hall. The Movin' Mavs finished their 2010–11 season with another third-place finish in the NIWBT tournament, losing to Illinois in the semifinals before again defeating Alabama in the third-place game. In October 2011, during the Jim Hayes Memorial Tournament, the Movin' Mavs played their last game at Texas Hall. In the 2011–12 season, the Movin' Mavs clinched the number one seed for the NIWBT tournament during the regular season, but were defeated by fourth-seeded Illinois the semifinals of the tournament in Champaign-Urbana, Illinois, ultimately besting Alabama once again in the third-place game. Seven UTA alumni competed in the 2012 Summer Paralympics in London, including wheelchair basketball players David Eng (who won a gold medal with Canada), Brad Ness (silver medal with Australia), and Jason Nelms and Paul Schulte (bronze medals with the United States).

In January 2013, the Movin' Mavs made their debut at College Park Center, splitting two games of a doubleheader, losing to Alabama 64–56 and then defeating Illinois 59–54. The 2012–13 team entered the NIWBT tournament in Birmingham, Alabama, ranked first in the country, ultimately finishing as runner-up after losing to Alabama 71–52 in the national championship game. The 2013–14 team hosted the national tournament at College Park Center but lost to Wisconsin–Whitewater in the championship game, 55–54. In April 2014, the team played an exhibition game at AT&T Stadium in Arlington as part of the 2014 NCAA Men's Final Four. From October 31 to November 2, 2014, the Movin' Mavs hosted the Jim Hayes Memorial Tournament in memory of long-time coach Jim Hayes. The 2014–15 team finished third in the national tournament in Columbia, Missouri, losing to Illinois in the semifinals, 58–57, but defeating the host Missouri Tigers in the third-place game, 84–53.

The 2015–16 Movin' Mavs finished in third place in the NIWBT tournament after defeating Illinois 63–59 in the consolation game. A total of ten UTA student-athletes and alumni competed in the 2016 Summer Paralympics in Rio de Janeiro, including three Movin' Mavs alumni: Aaron Gouge and Michael Paye, both representing the United States, and David Eng, representing Canada. The 2016–17 team won UTA's first national championship in 11 years, defeating defending champion Wisconsin–Whitewater 76–52 in the title game. The 2017–18 team finished third place in the NIWBT tournament in Marshall, Minnesota, defeating Missouri 49–35 in the third-place game. The 2018–19 Movin' Mavs similarly finished the NIWBT tournament in third place, again besting Missouri, 65–46, in the tournament in Champaign, Illinois. In March 2020, the 2020 NWBA national collegiate tournament was canceled due to the COVID-19 pandemic. The 2020–21 Movin' Mavs won the ninth national championship in program history at the national tournament, defeating host Alabama 66–51 in the championship game.

== Roster ==
Number	Player	Class	Hometown	Major
4	Bryce Cruz	Senior	(United States) Houston, Texas	Communications
2	Vincent Dallaire	Freshman	(Canada) Quebec City, Quebec	--
55	Jakob Gorton	Freshman	(United States) Dallas, Texas	--
35	Alex "AJ" Hummer	Junior	(United States) Waterloo, Indiana	Business Marketing
40	Isaac Hummer	Junior	(United States) Waterloo, Indiana	Elementary Education
00	Isaac Lipscomb	Sophomore	(United States) Homestead, Florida	Communications
12	Carrington Marendes	Sophomore	(United States) Woodville, Texas	Education and Coaching
1	Clarence McCarthy-Grogan	Senior	(Australia) Darwin, Northern Territory	Public Health
5	Logan Saenz	Senior	(United States) Frisco, Texas	Business Marketing
25	Aaron Summerill	Freshman	(United States) Orem, Utah	--
31	Topias Tyni	Graduate Student	(Finland) Hyvinkää	Mechanical Engineering
21	Ramiro Cortez Urquiza	Senior	(United States) Houston, Texas	Spanish
24	Amit Vigoda	Freshman	(Israel) Omer	International Business
3	Corey Wilson	Sophomore	(United States) Carrollton, Texas	Business Marketing

Updated for the 2020–2021 season.

== Coaches ==
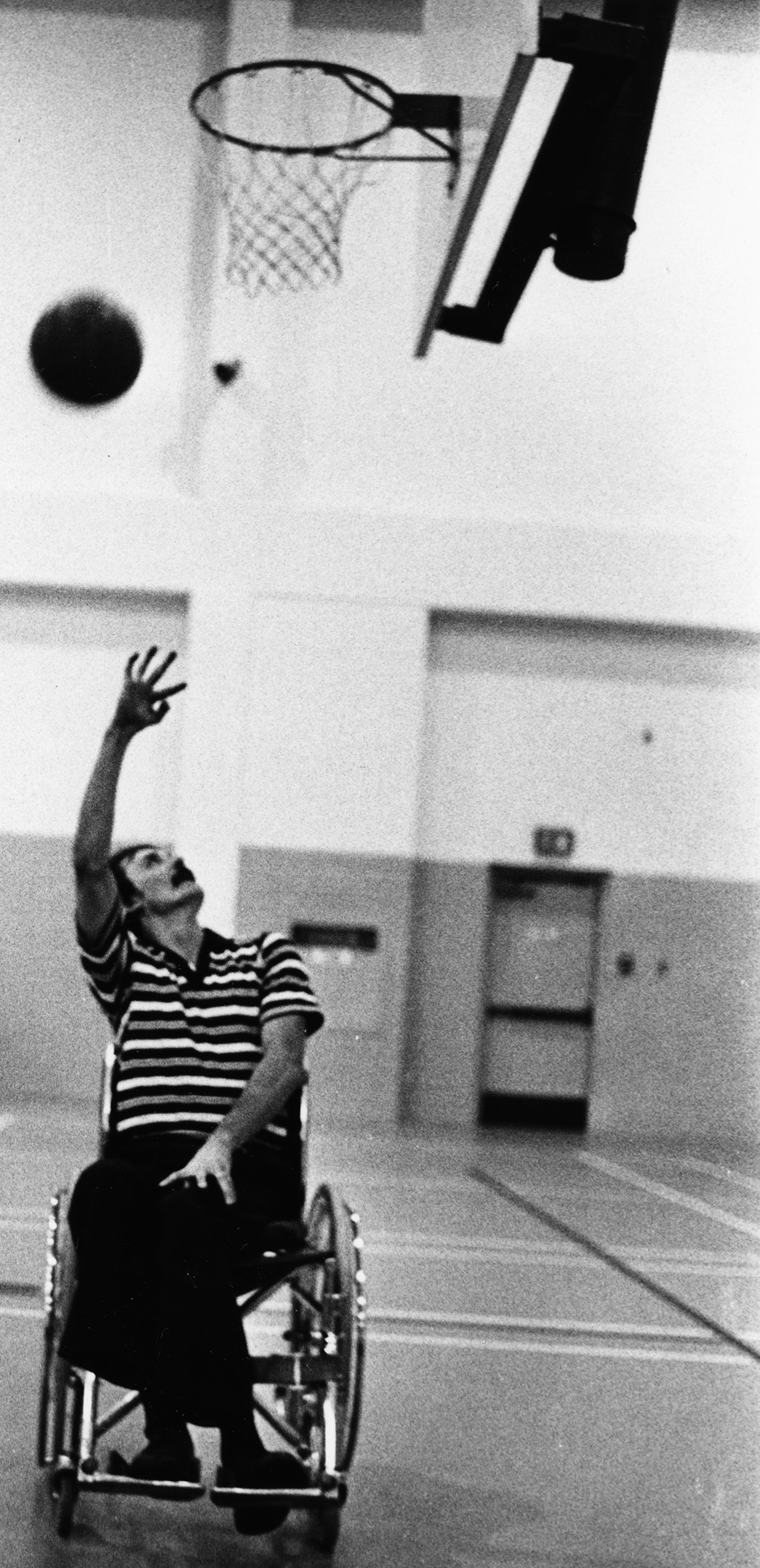
UTA Freewheelers player-coach Jim Hayes, undated

Jim Hayes, originally from Fort Worth, Texas, graduated from UTA in 1974 and spent his entire professional career at the university. He served as the director of UTA's program for disabled students. In 1976, Hayes founded the UTA Freewheelers. In 1988, he led the team as they joined the NWBA's Intercollegiate Division and changed their name to the Movin' Mavs. He coached the team until his death in May 2008. He was posthumously inducted into the NWBA Intercollegiate Division Hall of Fame in March 2012. Under Hayes, the team won seven national championships.

Doug Garner, originally from Camden, Arkansas, joined the Movin' Mavs as an assistant coach for Jim Hayes in 2007. After Hayes' death, he was named interim head coach, and was promoted to head coach on October 15, 2008. Garner was inducted into the NWBA's Hall of Fame in March 2019. Under Garner, the Movin' Mavs won three national championships, in 2017, 2021 and 2022.

== Season-by-season results ==
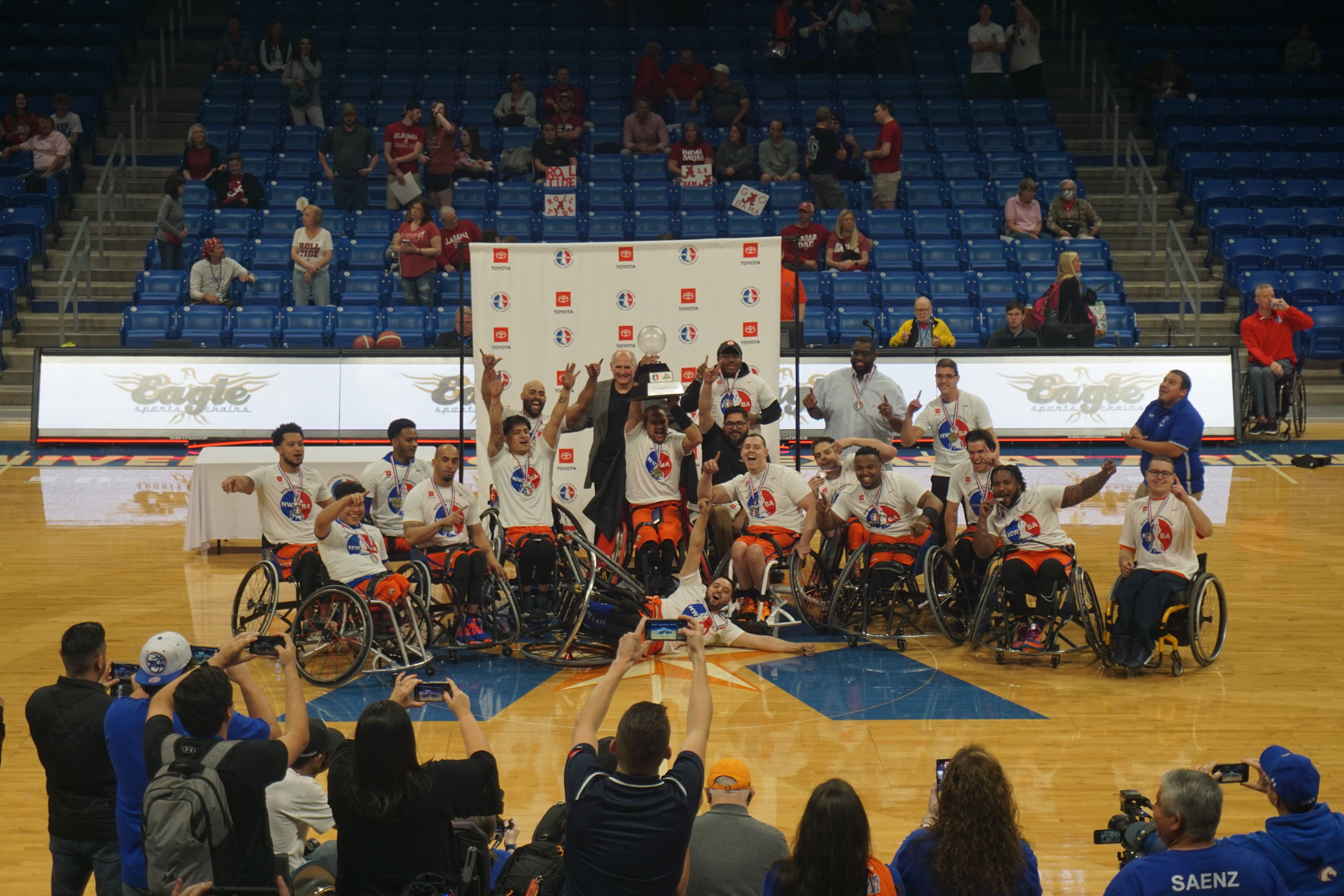
The Movin' Mavs celebrating after winning the 2022 National Intercollegiate Wheelchair Basketball Tournament Men's Championship

Record table
Season	Coach	Overall	Conference	Standing	Postseason
Jim Hayes () (1988–2008)
1988–1989	Hayes				
1989–1990	Hayes				
1990–1991	Hayes				NIWBT Champion
1991–1992	Hayes				NIWBT Champion
1992–1993	Hayes				NIWBT Champion
1993–1994	Hayes				NIWBT Champion
1994–1995	Hayes				NIWBT Runner-Up
1995–1996	Hayes				NIWBT Runner-Up
1996–1997	Hayes				NIWBT Champion
1997–1998	Hayes				NIWBT Runner-Up
1998–1999	Hayes				
1999–2000	Hayes				NIWBT Runner-Up
2000–2001	Hayes				NIWBT Runner-Up
2001–2002	Hayes				NIWBT Champion
2002–2003	Hayes				NIWBT Runner-Up
2003–2004	Hayes				NIWBT Runner-Up
2004–2005	Hayes				NIWBT Runner-Up
2005–2006	Hayes				NIWBT Champion
2006–2007	Hayes				
2007–2008	Hayes				
Doug Garner () (2008–2022)
2008–2009	Garner	18–6			NIWBT Third Place
2009–2010	Garner	27–7			NIWBT Third Place
2010–2011	Garner				NIWBT Third Place
2011–2012	Garner				NIWBT Third Place
2012–2013	Garner				NIWBT Runner-Up
2013–2014	Garner				NIWBT Runner-Up
2014–2015	Garner				NIWBT Third Place
2015–2016	Garner				NIWBT Third Place
2016–2017	Garner				NIWBT Champion
2017–2018	Garner				NIWBT Third Place
2018–2019	Garner				NIWBT Third Place
2019–2020	Garner				Tournament canceled
2020–2021	Garner				NIWBT Champion
2021–2022	Garner				NIWBT Champion
Total:					
National champion Postseason invitational champion Conference regular season champion Conference regular season and conference tournament champion Division regular season champion Division regular season and conference tournament champion Conference tournament champion

== Notable Movin' Mavs Paralympians ==
Jim Hayes -, Won Two Bronze Medals in the 100m and 200m at the 1984 Stoke Mandeville International Games. Later referred to as 1984 Paralympics, but at the time referred to as for the “Disabled.”

Randy Snow- - One time summer Olympian and five time Paralympian. 1984(Los Angeles), 1984 (Stoke Mandeville), 1988(Seoul), 1992(Barcelona), 1996(Atlanta), and 2002 (Salt Lake City). Won Gold in singles and doubles tennis in 1992. (Barcelona). Won Silver Medal Wheelchair 1500 meters 1984(Los Angeles) and 1984(Stoke Mandeville). Won a bronze medal in Wheelchair Basketball 1996(Atlanta.) First Paralympian to be inducted into the Olympic Hall of Fame and second wheelchair tennis player to be inducted into the international Tennis Hall of Fame. 10-time U.S. Open Champion, Texas Sports Hall of Fame, and National Wheelchair Basketball Hall of Fame.

Abu Yilla: One-time Paralympian; 1988(Seoul). Represented Team USA. Won a gold medal for track as a 4x100 participant in 1988.

Gabe Diaz DeLeon: Five-time Paralympian; 1988(Seoul), 1992(Barcelona), 1996(Atlanta), 2000(Sydney), 2004(Athens). Represented Team USA. Participated in track & field- won a gold medal in 1992 in javelin. Won a silver medal in 1992 in discus. Won two bronze medals in 1988 in shot put and discus. Won a bronze medal in 1996 in discus. Won a bronze medal in 2000 in discus.

Enoch Ablorh: Four-time Paralympian; 1992(Barcelona), 1996(Atlanta), 2000(Sydney), 2008(Beijing). Represented Sweden in Wheelchair Basketball.

Greg Speed: One-time Paralympian; 1992(Barcelona). Represented Team USA. Also broke the US national record in the 100m class T-4 race in 1990 and the world record in the 4 × 100 m class T-4 relay race in 1991.

Steve Welch: Five-time Paralympian; 1996(Atlanta), 2000(Sydney), 2004(Athens), 2008(Beijing), 2012(London). Represented Team USA. Participated in Wheelchair Tennis- won a gold medal in doubles in 1996. Won two silver medals in singles in 1996 & 2000. Won a bronze medal in doubles in 2000.

Willie Hernandez: One-time Paralympian 2000(Sydney). Represented Team USA. Won a bronze medal in Wheelchair Basketball in 2000.

Brad Ness Five-time Paralympian; 2000(Sydney), 2004(Athens), 2008(Beijing), 2012(London), 2016(Rio). Represented Australia. Won a gold medal in 2008 and two silver medals in 2004 and 2012 all in Wheelchair Basketball.

Cezar Olivas: One-time Paralympian 2000(Sydney). Represented Mexico in Wheelchair Basketball.

Paul Schulte: Three-time Paralympian. 2000(Sydney), 2008(Beijing), 2012(London). Represented Team USA. Won two bronze medals in Wheelchair Basketball (2000, 2012).

David Eng: Four-time Paralympian; 2004(Athens), 2008(Beijing), 2012(London), 2016(Rio). Represented Canada. Won two gold medals in 2004 & 2012 and won a silver medal in 2008 all in Wheelchair Basketball.

Campbell Message: One-time Paralympian; 2004(Athens). Represented Australia. Won a silver medal in Wheelchair Basketball in 2004.

Brent Lakatos: Five-time Paralympian; 2004(Athens) 2008(Beijing), 2012(London), 2016(Rio), 2020(Tokyo). Represented Canada. Participated in Wheelchair Racing- won a gold medal in 2016. Has won eight silver medals (3-2012, 1-2016, 4-2020). Won two bronze medals in 2016.

Bob Lujano: One-time Paralympian; 2004(Athens). Represented Team USA. Won a gold medal for Wheelchair Rugby.

Jason Nelms: Three-time Paralympian; 2004(Athens), 2008(Beijing), and 2012(London). Represented Team USA. Won a bronze medal in Wheelchair Basketball 2012.

Mike Paye: Four-time Paralympian; 2004(Athens), 2008(Beijing), 2016(Rio), 2020(Tokyo). Represented Team USA. Won two gold medals in 2016 & 2020 in Wheelchair Basketball.

Jon Rydberg: Four-time Paralympian; 2004(Athens), 2008 (Beijing), 2012(London), 2016(Rio). Represented Team USA in Wheelchair Tennis.

Nick Taylor: One-time Paralympian; 2012(London.) Represented Australia. Won a silver medal in Wheelchair Basketball.

Aaron Gouge: One-time Paralympian; 2016(Rio). Represented Team USA. Won a gold medal in Wheelchair Basketball.

Vince Dallaire: One-time Paralympian; 2020(Tokyo). Represented Canada in Wheelchair Basketball.

Ray Hennigar: One-time Paralympian; 2020(Tokyo). Represented Team USA. Won a silver medal for Wheelchair Rugby.

John McPhail: One-time Paralympian; 2020(Tokyo). Represented Australia in Wheelchair Basketball.

Jorge Sanchez: One-time Paralympian; 2020(Tokyo). Represented Team USA. Won a gold medal for Wheelchair Basketball.

== See also ==
- UT Arlington Mavericks women's wheelchair basketball
