= Georgia Bishop-Cash =

Australian basketball player (born 2001)

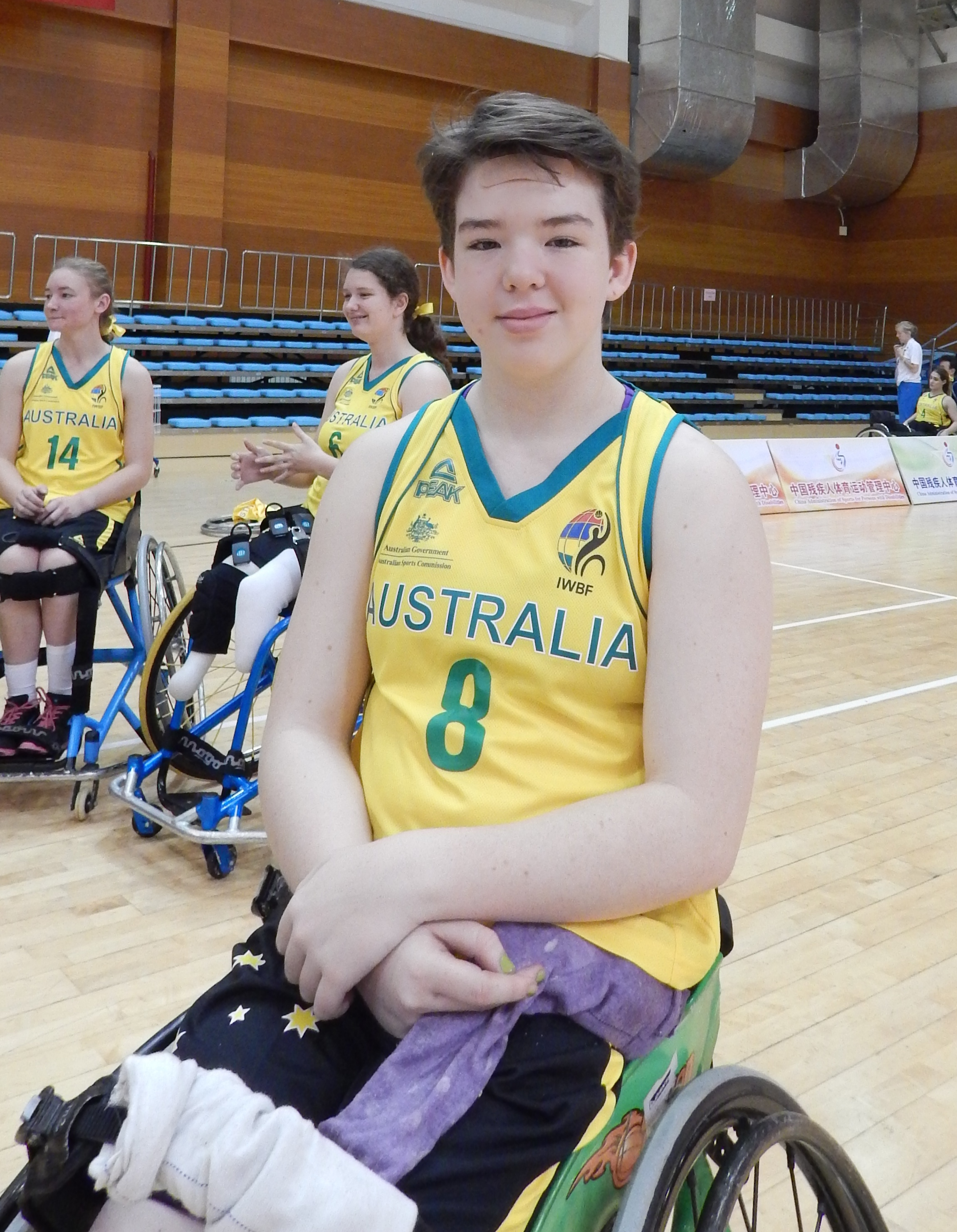
- Georgia Bishop-Cash

Personal information
- Nationality: Australia
- Born: 7 March 2001 (age 25)

Sport
- Country: Australia
- Sport: Wheelchair basketball
- Disability class: 4.0
- Event: Women's team
- Club: Minecraft Comets
Medal record
Wheelchair basketball
U25 Women's World Championships
Silver medal – second place	2015 Beijing, China	Women's wheelchair basketball
Silver medal – second place	2019 Suphanburi, Thailand	Women's wheelchair basketball

Georgia Bishop-Cash (born 7 March 2001) is a swimmer and 4.0 point Australian wheelchair basketball player. She made her international debut with the Australian U25 team (the Devils) at the 2015 Women's U25 Wheelchair Basketball World Championship in Beijing, winning silver. She was part of the Minecraft Comets team that won the Women's National Wheelchair Basketball League (WNWBL) championship title in 2014 and 2018, and were named the Queensland Sporting Wheelies Team of the Year for 2014. In May 2019, she was part of the Devils team that won silver at the 2019 Women's U25 Wheelchair Basketball World Championship in Suphanburi, Thailand.

== Biography ==
Georgia Bishop-Cash was born with arthrogryposis and bilateral club feet, requiring her to walk with the aid of calipers. She had painful surgery almost every year until she was eight. Regular exercise was recommended, so she began cycling on an exercise bike and swimming. She enjoyed swimming and started doing it competitively. In 2012, she won the 50m, 100m and 200m freestyle and 50m backstroke events in her age group at the Queensland Schools Championship, where she was the youngest competitor.

In June 2009 Bishop-Cash took up wheelchair basketball, and soon became a member if the state junior team, the Rolling Thunder. In 2014, she won her first national gold medal with the Rolling Thunder at the 2014 Kevin Coombs Cup. She joined the Queensland senior women's side, the Minecraft Comets, and was mentored by coach Tom Kyle and senior player Bridie Kean. The Minecraft Comets won the Women's National Wheelchair Basketball League championship in 2014, and were named the Queensland Sporting Wheelies Team of the Year. She was part of the Comets side that won the championship again in 2018.

In June 2015 her Paralympic dream came another step closer when she was selected as the youngest member of the U25 Women's side, known as the Devils, which won silver at the 2015 Women's U25 Wheelchair Basketball World Championship in Beijing. Four years later she won a second silver medal with the Devils at the 2019 Women's U25 Wheelchair Basketball World Championship in Suphanburi, Thailand.

Bishop-Cash attended Mary Immaculate School in Annerley, Queensland.
