= Jessica Cronje =

Australian wheelchair basketball player

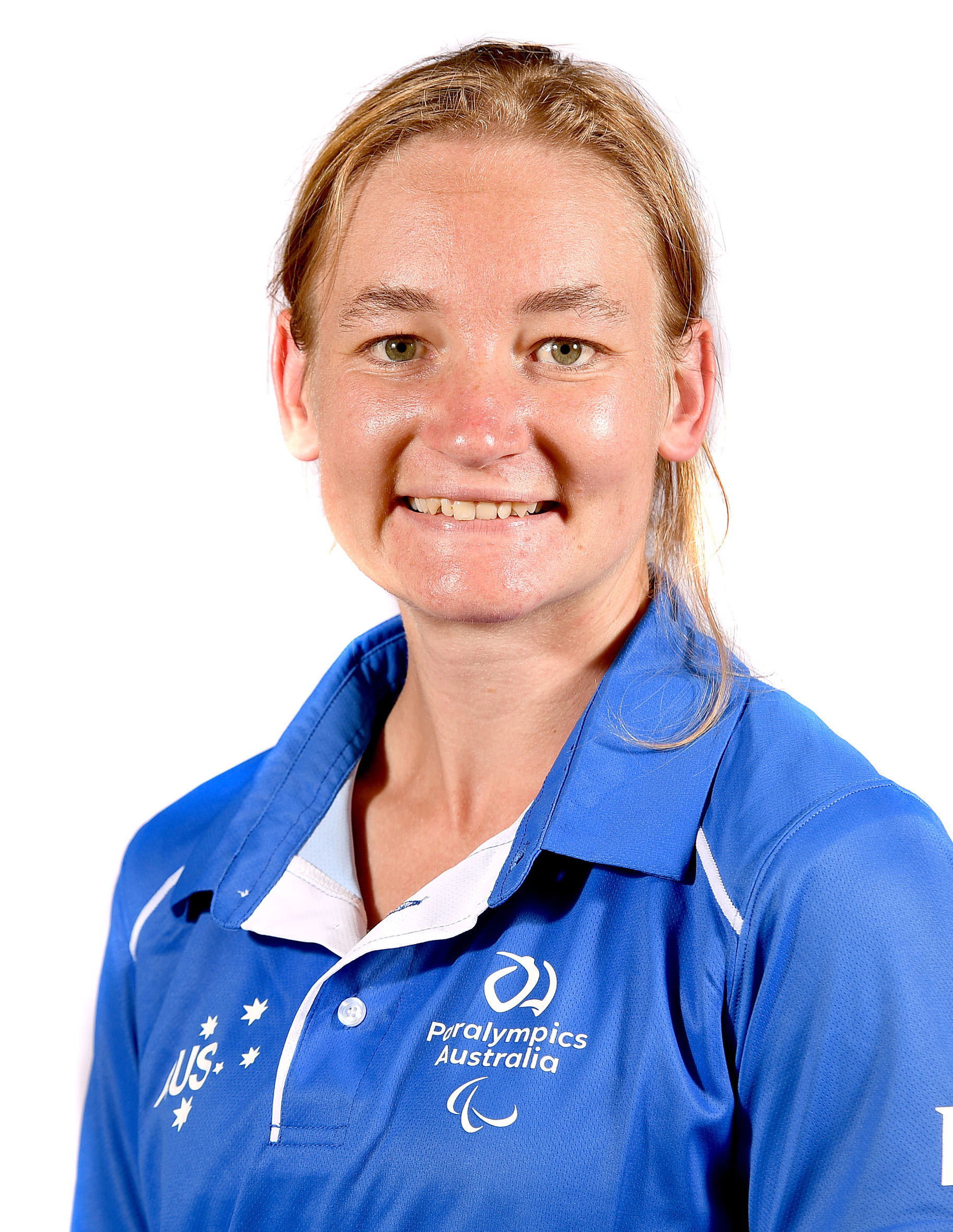
- Jessica Cronje in 2019

Personal information
- Born: 25 January 1998 (age 28)

Sport
- Country: Australia
- Sport: Wheelchair basketball
- Disability class: 4.0
- Event: Women's team

Jessica Cronje (born 25 January 1998) is a 4.0 point Australian wheelchair basketball player. She made her international debut with the Australian women's national wheelchair basketball team (the Gliders) at the Osaka Cup in February 2016. In May 2019, she was part of the Australian U25 team (the Devils) that won silver at the 2019 Women's U25 Wheelchair Basketball World Championship in Suphanburi, Thailand, and she represented Australia at the 2020 Summer Paralympics in Tokyo and the 2022 Wheelchair Basketball World Championships in Dubai.

== Biography ==
Jessica Cronje was born on 25 January 1998. She has cerebral palsy. She attended Camden High School and in 2020 lives in Menangle, New South Wales.

== Career ==
A 4.0 point forward, Cronje made her international debut with the Australian women's national wheelchair basketball team (the Gliders) at the Osaka Cup in February 2016. She was a member of the Australian U25 team (the Devils) that won the silver medal at the 2015 Women's U25 Wheelchair Basketball World Championship in Suphanburi, Thailand. In 2020, the AMP Foundation's Tomorrow Fund awarded her $10,000 to help buy a custom-built sports wheelchair that she aimed to use at the 2020 Summer Paralympics in Tokyo.

The Gliders finished ninth after winning the 9th-10th classification match in Tokyo. She went on to play with the Gliders at the 2022 Wheelchair Basketball World Championships in Dubai in June 2023.

Besides wheelchair basketball, she is classified as a T37 track and field athlete. In 2015, she was named the Athlete of the Year by the South West Sydney Academy of Sports.
