= Teisha Shadwell =

Australian wheelchair basketball player

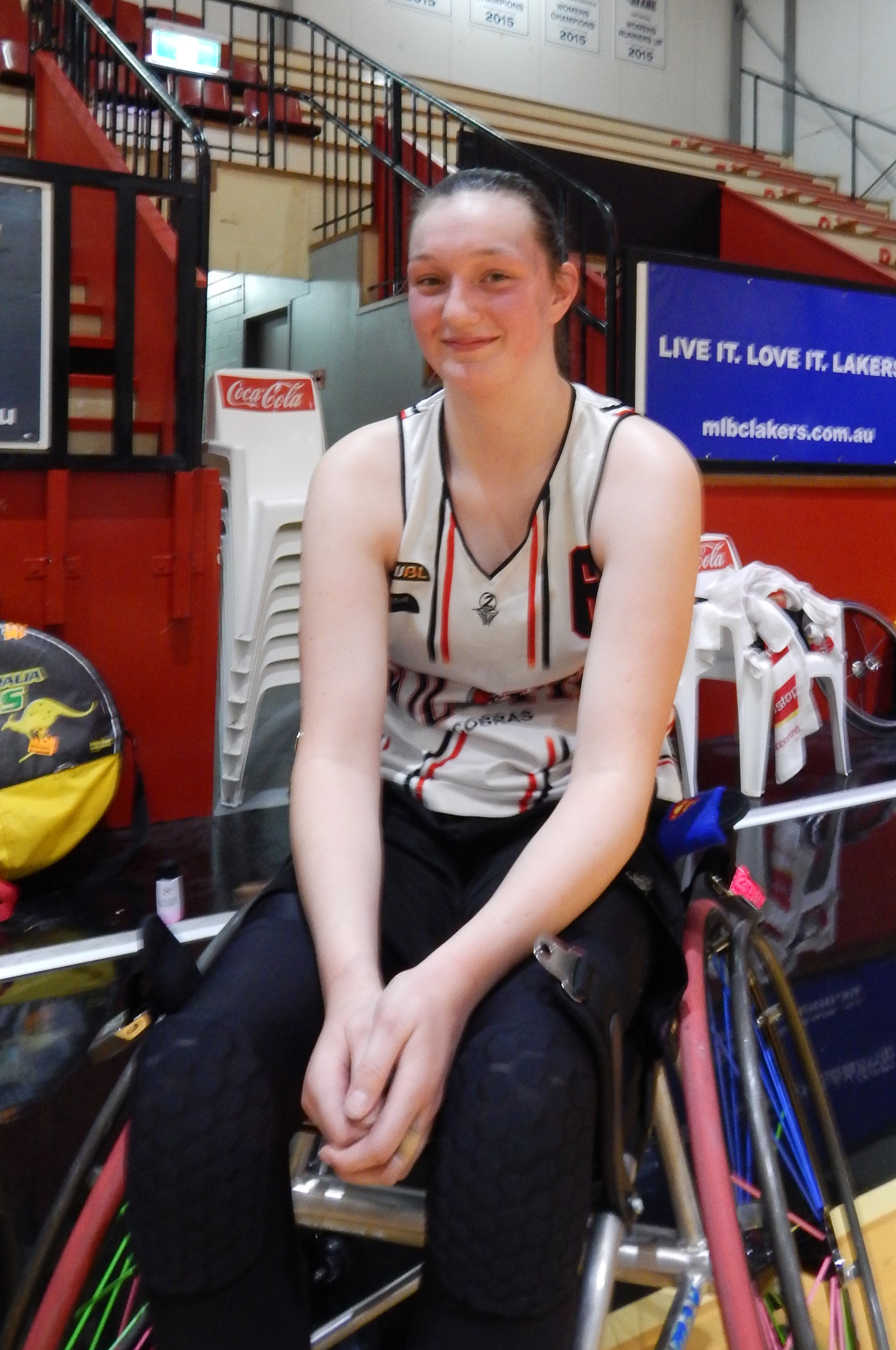
- Teisha Shadwell at the Kilsyth Sports Centre in April 2018

Personal information
- Born: 2003 (age 22–23) Clayton, Victoria
- Height: 177 cm (5 ft 10 in)

Sport
- Country: Australia
- Sport: Wheelchair basketball
- Disability class: 4.5
- College team: University of arizona wildcats
- Club: Kilsyth Cobras
Medal record
Wheelchair basketball
U25 Women's World Championships
Silver medal – second place	2019 Suphanburi, Thailand	Women's wheelchair basketball
AOZ Paralympic Qualifiers
Silver medal – second place	2019 Pattaya, Thailand	Women's wheelchair basketball

Teisha Shadwell (born 2003) is an Australian 4.5 point wheelchair basketball player. In May 2019, she was part of the Australian Devils U25 team that won silver at the 2019 Women's U25 Wheelchair Basketball World Championship in Suphanburi, Thailand.

== Biography ==
Teisha Shadwell began playing basketball when she was five years old, and played at the state level when she was nine. She won a Grand Final playing with the Knox Raiders Under 12 team, and was named MVP for that game. She went on to be selected for the Victorian Under 14 and Under 15 state sides.

In 2016, Shadwell played with the Knox 14.1 team that won both the Melbourne United Victorian Junior Basketball League (VJBL) Victorian Championship and then, in September 2016, the Australian Under 14 Club Championships in Newcastle. She had been feeling considerable pain, and after the match, CT scans revealed that she had been playing the whole week with breaks in bones in her hand and both her feet. Her hand healed well, but the navicular bone fractures did not. Doctors gave her a ten per cent chance of ever being able to play basketball again. Any further attempt risked serious and permanent injury.

In January 2017, Shadwell turned to playing wheelchair basketball. She made rapid progress. Six weeks later, she was playing with the Kilsyth Cobras in the Women's National Wheelchair Basketball League (WNWBL), and training with the Australian national team (the Gliders), and the Under 25 national team (the Devils) in preparation for the 2019 Under 25 World Championships. That year she received the WNWBL's 2017 best new talent award, and Basketball Victoria's Charles Ryan award for Wheelchair Athlete Of The Year. A series of fundraisers, including a campaign on GoFundMe, raised money for a custom-built wheelchair.

Shadwell played in the Victorian side in the 2019 Kevin Coombs Cup, and in May 2019, she made her international debut with the Devils at the 2019 Women's U25 Wheelchair Basketball World Championship in Suphanburi, Thailand, where they won silver.

Shadwell currently plays D-1 wheelchair basketball at the University of Arizona.

WNWBL Statistics - Seasons 2017-
Competition	Season	M	FGM-A	FG%	3PM-A	3P%	FTM-A	FT%	PTS	OFF	DEF	TOT	AST	PTS	ref
WNWBL	2017	15	64 - 176	36.36	--	--	19 - 43	44.19	147	2.47	5.47	7.93	0.8	9.8	
WNWBL	2018	15	82 - 192	42.71	--	--	30 - 69	43.48	194	2.13	9.33	11.47	3.13	12.93	
WNWBL	2019	17	136 - 302	45.03	2 - 8	25.00	26 - 54	48.15	300	3.82	10.88	14.71	3.76	17.65	
