= Zasa Mergen Baatar =

Tornado god in Buryat mythology

Zasa Mergen Baatar, in Buryat mythology, is the tornado-god riding a brown hawk-horse.

Han Hormasta's eldest son Zasa Mergen Baatar married Sesegen Nogoon the daughter of Segeen Sebdeg. He obtained her as his bride by successfully wrestling (and thereby transforming into the three Sharaidai khan-s) the three sons of Atai Ulaan : Sagaan Hasar Buhe, Shara Hasar Buhe, and Hara Hasar Buhe.

== Bibliography ==
- Sarangerel (Julie Ann Stewart) : Chosen by the Spirits : Following Your Shamanic Calling. Destiny Books, Rochester (VT), 2001.
