= Madeleine Thompson =

British wheelchair basketball player

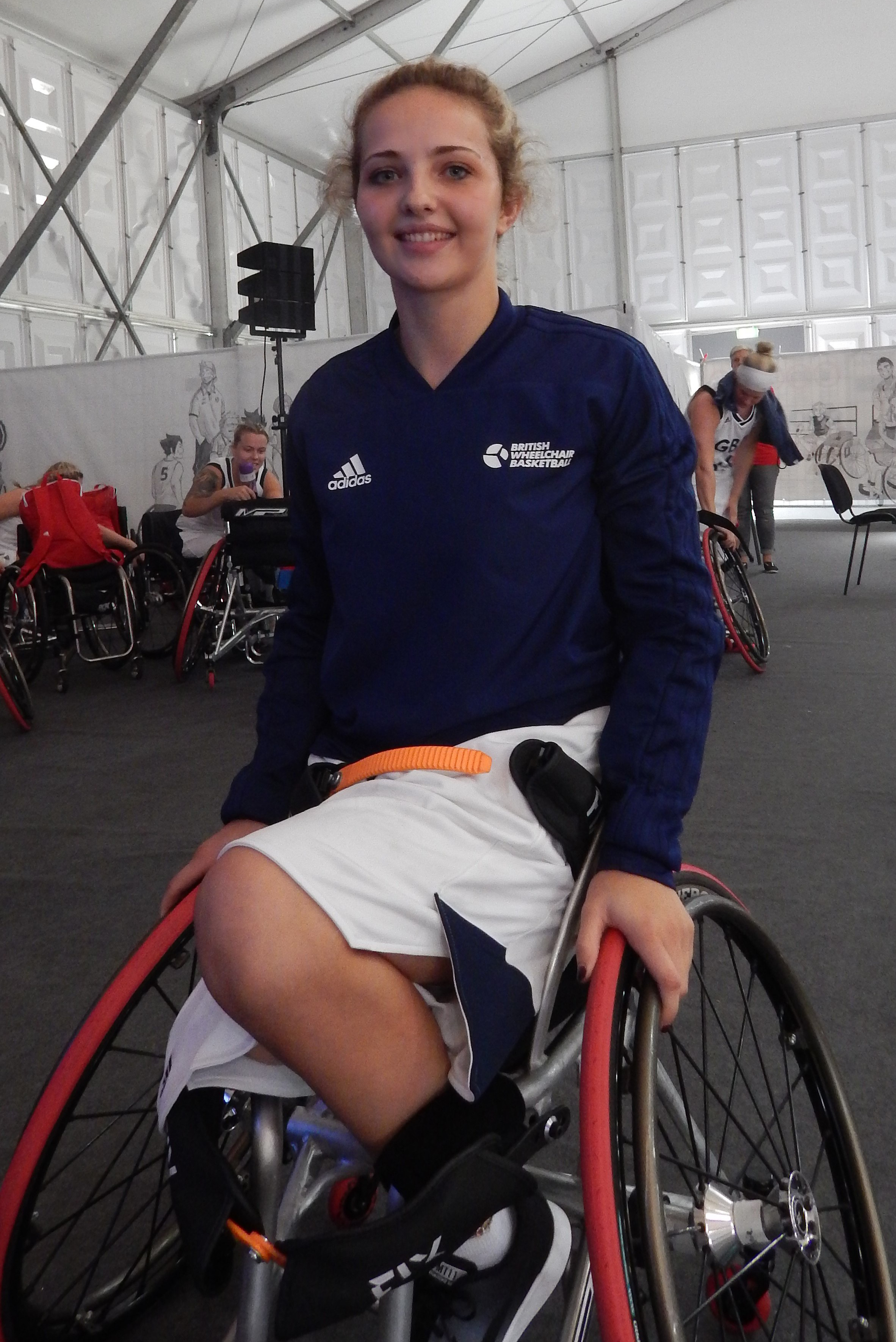
- Madeleine Thompson at the 2018 Wheelchair Basketball World Championship in Hamburg

Personal information
- Nationality: Great Britain
- Born: 29 March 1995 (age 31)

Sport
- Country: Great Britain
- Sport: Wheelchair basketball
- Disability class: 4
- Event: Women's team
- Club: Sheffield Steelers
Medal record
Wheelchair basketball
U25 Women's World Championships
Bronze medal – third place	2011 St Catharines, Canada	Women's wheelchair basketball
European Championships
Bronze medal – third place	2009 Stoke Mandeville, United Kingdom	Women's wheelchair basketball
Bronze medal – third place	2011 Nazareth, Israel	Women's wheelchair basketball
Bronze medal – third place	2013 Frankfurt, Germany	Women's wheelchair basketball
Bronze medal – third place	2015 Worcester, United Kingdom	Women's wheelchair basketball
Bronze medal – third place	2017 Tenerife, Spain	Women's wheelchair basketball
Women's World Championships
Silver medal – second place	2018 Hamburg, Germany	Women's wheelchair basketball

Madeleine Thompson (born 29 March 1995) is a 4 point British wheelchair basketball player. In 2008, at the age of thirteen, she became the youngest ever player to represent Great Britain in wheelchair basketball. She was part of the British team at the 2012 Paralympic Games in London, the 2014 Women's World Wheelchair Basketball Championship in Toronto, and the 2018 Wheelchair Basketball World Championship in Hamburg.

== Biography ==
Madeleine Thompson was born in Chesterfield on 29 March 1995. She was educated at Lady Manners School. She took up wheelchair basketball at the age of ten after a meeting with the British player Callum Gordon. This led to an invitation to attend a training session for the Sheffield Steelers. She was graded a 4 point player. When she was thirteen, she became the youngest wheelchair basketball player ever to represent Great Britain, as part of the team at the Under 22 European Championships at Adana, Turkey, in 2008. She was selected a member of the senior national team the following year, and won bronze at the European Wheelchair Basketball Championship in Stoke Mandeville. She made her Paralympic debut at the 2012 Summer Paralympics in London, and won silver at the 2013 Under 25 European Championship. After a break to start a family, she returned to the training programme in 2017, and was part of the team at the 2018 Wheelchair Basketball World Championship. Team Great Britain won silver. This was the best-ever performance of the British women's team, which had never made the finals before.

== Achievements ==
- 2009: Bronze at European Wheelchair Basketball Championship (Stoke Mandeville, United Kingdom)
- 2010: Sixth at 2010 Wheelchair Basketball World Championship (Birmingham, United Kingdom)
- 2011: Bronze at European Wheelchair Basketball Championship (Nazareth, Israel)
- 2011: Bronze at 2011 Women's U25 Wheelchair Basketball World Championship (St Catharines, Canada)
- 2012: Seventh at 2012 Paralympic Games (London, United Kingdom)
- 2013: Bronze at European Championships (Frankfurt, Germany)
- 2014: Fifth at the World Wheelchair Basketball Championship (Toronto, Canada)
- 2015: Bronze at the European Championships (Worcester, England)
- 2017: Bronze at the European Championships (Tenerife, Spain)
- 2018: Silver at the 2018 Wheelchair Basketball World Championship (Hamburg, Germany)
