= UT Arlington Mavericks women's wheelchair basketball =

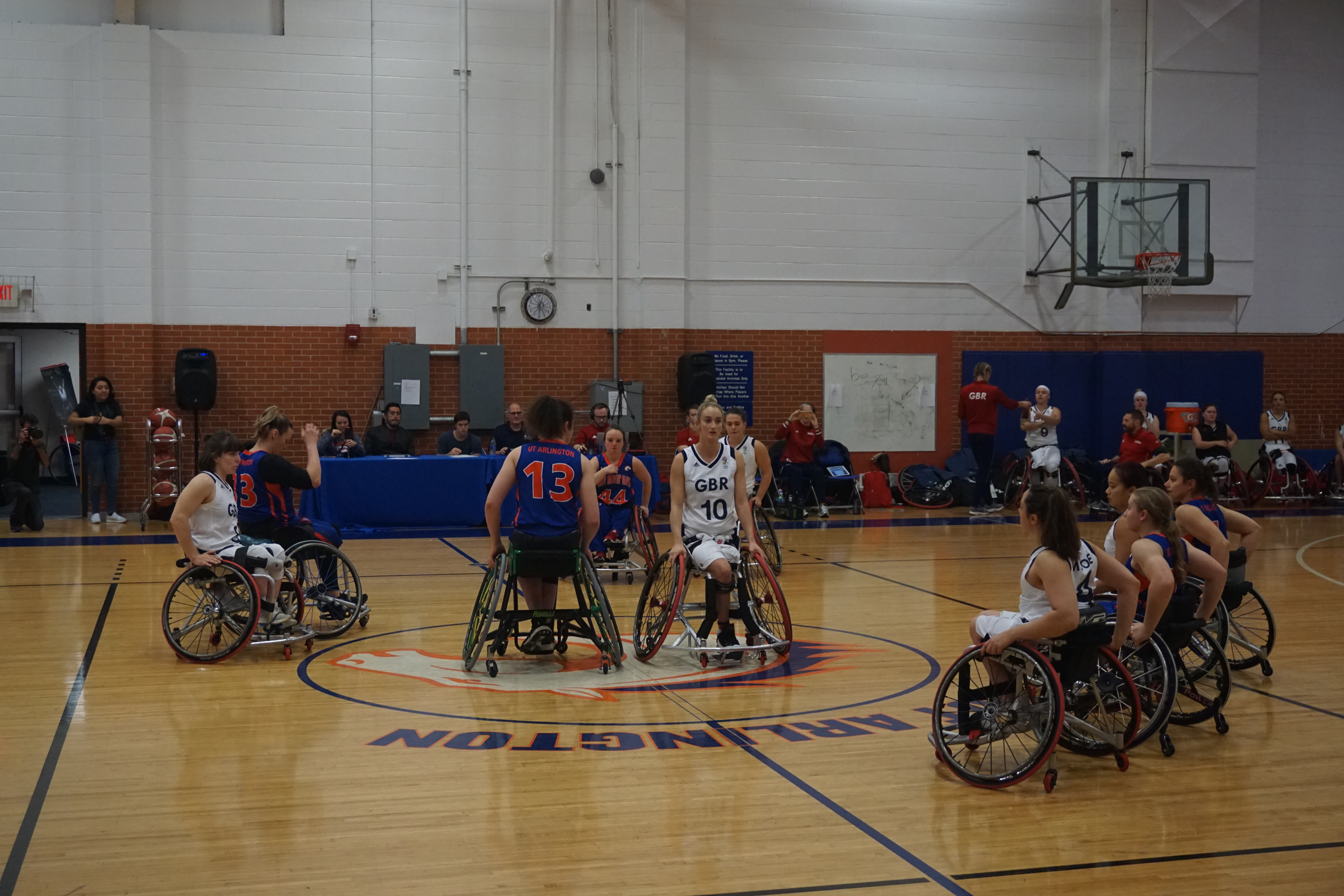
The Lady Movin' Mavs in action against the Great Britain national team in 2019

The UT Arlington Mavericks women's wheelchair basketball team, commonly known as the Lady Movin' Mavs, is the women's college wheelchair basketball team representing the University of Texas at Arlington (UTA). Established in 2013, the team plays under the auspices of the National Wheelchair Basketball Association (NWBA). It has been coached by Jason Nelms since its establishment.

The Lady Movin' Mavs have won two National Intercollegiate Wheelchair Basketball Tournament (NIWBT) national championships, in 2016 and 2018. Two of its players, Abby Dunkin and Rose Hollermann, have played for the United States Paralympic wheelchair basketball team. Two additional players of international note who have played for the Lady Movin' Mavs are Australian Annabelle Lindsay and Canadian Élodie Tessier.

== History ==
The Lady Movin' Mavs were established in 2013. Jason Nelms was named its head coach. He previously played as a member of UTA's men's wheelchair basketball team, the Movin' Mavs, from 2000 to 2005 and also competed in three Paralympic Games. During its inaugural 2013–14 season, the team had no substitute players, instead playing all five of its players for the full 40 minutes of each game. The Lady Movin' Mavs played their first games against the University of Alabama and University of Illinois during a tournament in late October 2013. They also played in the National Wheelchair Basketball Association Tournament (NWBAT) in their first season, but were disqualified because one of their players fell sick before the tournament and the team could not field a five-player lineup. In April 2014, the team signed Rose Hollermann and Josie Aslakson in its first recruiting class.

The Lady Movin' Mavs were initially a sports club at UTA and transitioned to full intercollegiate team status once sufficient funds had been raised. It plays under the auspices of the National Wheelchair Basketball Association (NWBA), which organizes intercollegiate wheelchair basketball tournaments across the United States. During the 2014–15 season, the team's roster grew from five to nine players, which allowed the team greater flexibility with strategy and opportunities to rest players. That season, the team played in the National Intercollegiate Wheelchair Basketball Tournament (NIWBT), where it lost to the University of Illinois in its first game and then lost to the University of Wisconsin–Whitewater in the third-place game.

During the 2015–16 season, just the third season in the team's existence, it won its first national championship by beating the University of Alabama and then the University of Illinois in the NIWBT. The Lady Movin' Mavs finished with a 19–5 record on the season. That summer, it also had its first two players make the United States Paralympic wheelchair basketball team roster for the 2016 Summer Paralympics: Abby Dunkin and Rose Hollermann.

The Lady Movin' Mavs finished the 2016–17 season with a 57–48 loss to the University of Alabama in the championship game of the NIWBT after they beat the University of Illinois 68–19 in their first-round game.

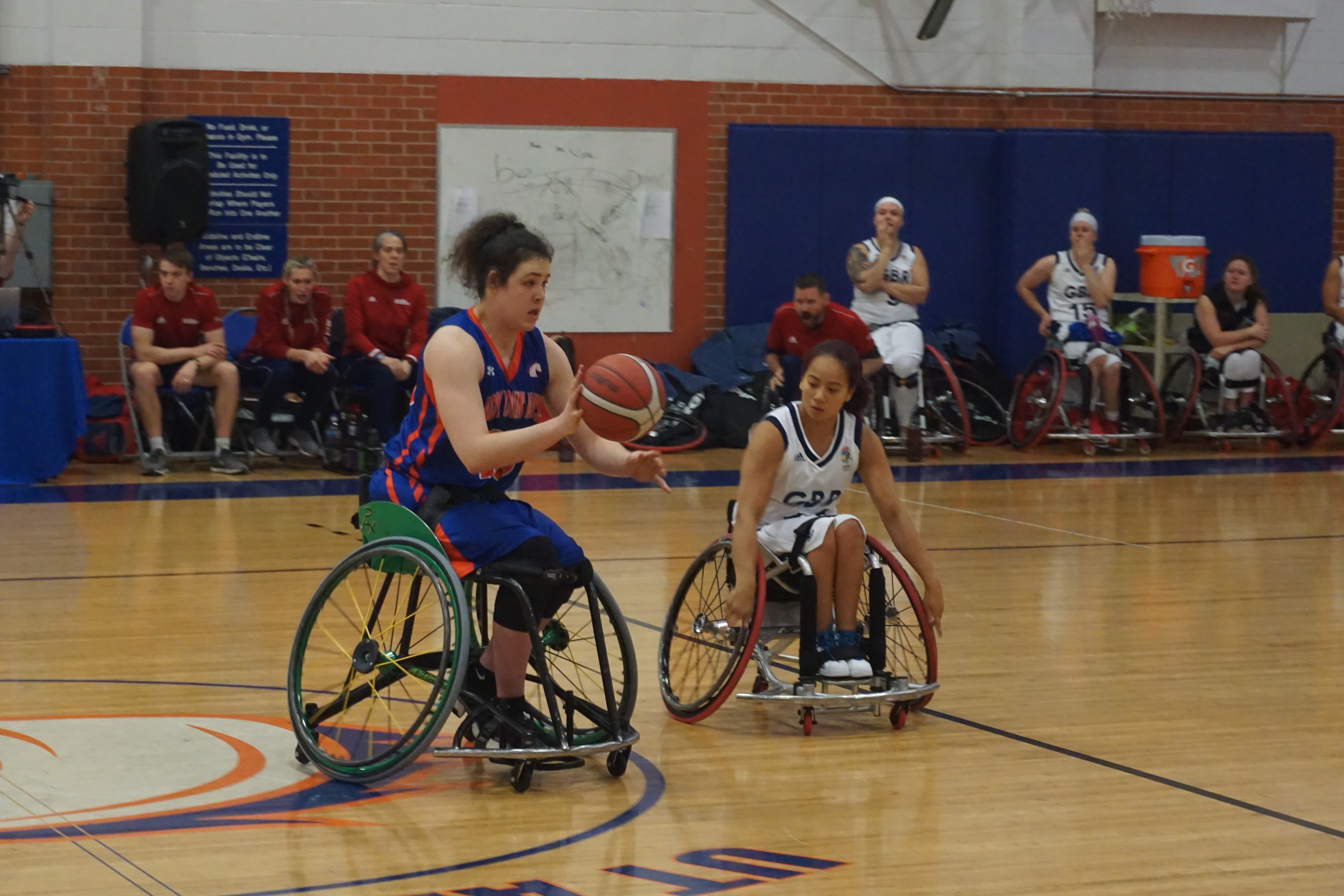
Annabelle Lindsay with the Lady Movin' Mavs in 2019

During the 2017–18 season, the Lady Movin' Mavs recorded a perfect 20–0 season record. The team defeated the University of Alabama 65–55 in the NIWBT championship game to win its second national title. It was led by the play of veterans Dunkin, Hollermann, and Morgan Wood as well as Australian freshman Annabelle Lindsay.

The Lady Movin' Mavs finished the 2018–19 season with an 82–76 overtime loss to the University of Alabama in the championship game of the NIWBT. In 2019, the team added Canadian freshman Élodie Tessier to its roster.

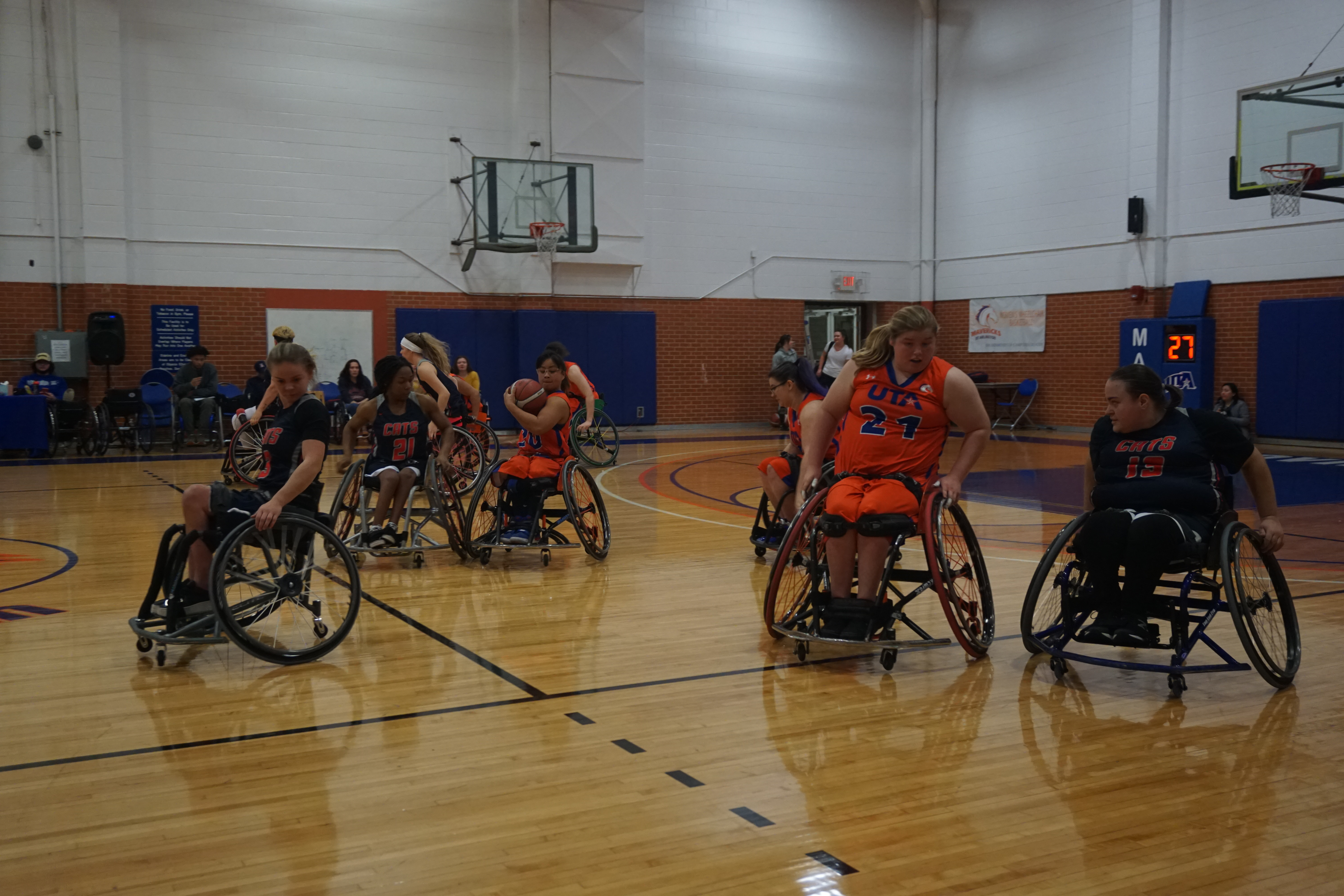
The Lady Movin' Mavs in action against the Arizona Wildcats in 2020

As of 2019, the Lady Movin' Mavs are one of only five women's college wheelchair basketball teams in the country, along with the University of Alabama, the University of Arizona, the University of Illinois, and the University of Wisconsin–Whitewater.

== Roster ==
| Player | Hometown | Major |
|---|---|---|
| Elizabeth Becker | (United States) Charlotte, North Carolina | Broadcasting |
| Victoria Ceballos | (United States) Brownsville, Texas | Exercise Physiology |
| Alexus Cook | (United States) San Antonio, Texas | Criminal Justice / Psychology |
| Jayna Doll | (Canada) Camrose, Alberta | Theatre Arts |
| Meagan Lotz | (United States) Redmond, Washington | Aerospace Engineering |
| Denise Rodriguez | (United States) Richardson, Texas | Social Work |
| Élodie Tessier | (Canada) Saint-Germain-de Grantham, Quebec | International Business |
| Zoe Voris | (United States) Chicago, Illinois | Fine Arts |
| Angelina Elise Welfle | (United States) Fort Wayne, Indiana | Public Relations |

== Coaches ==
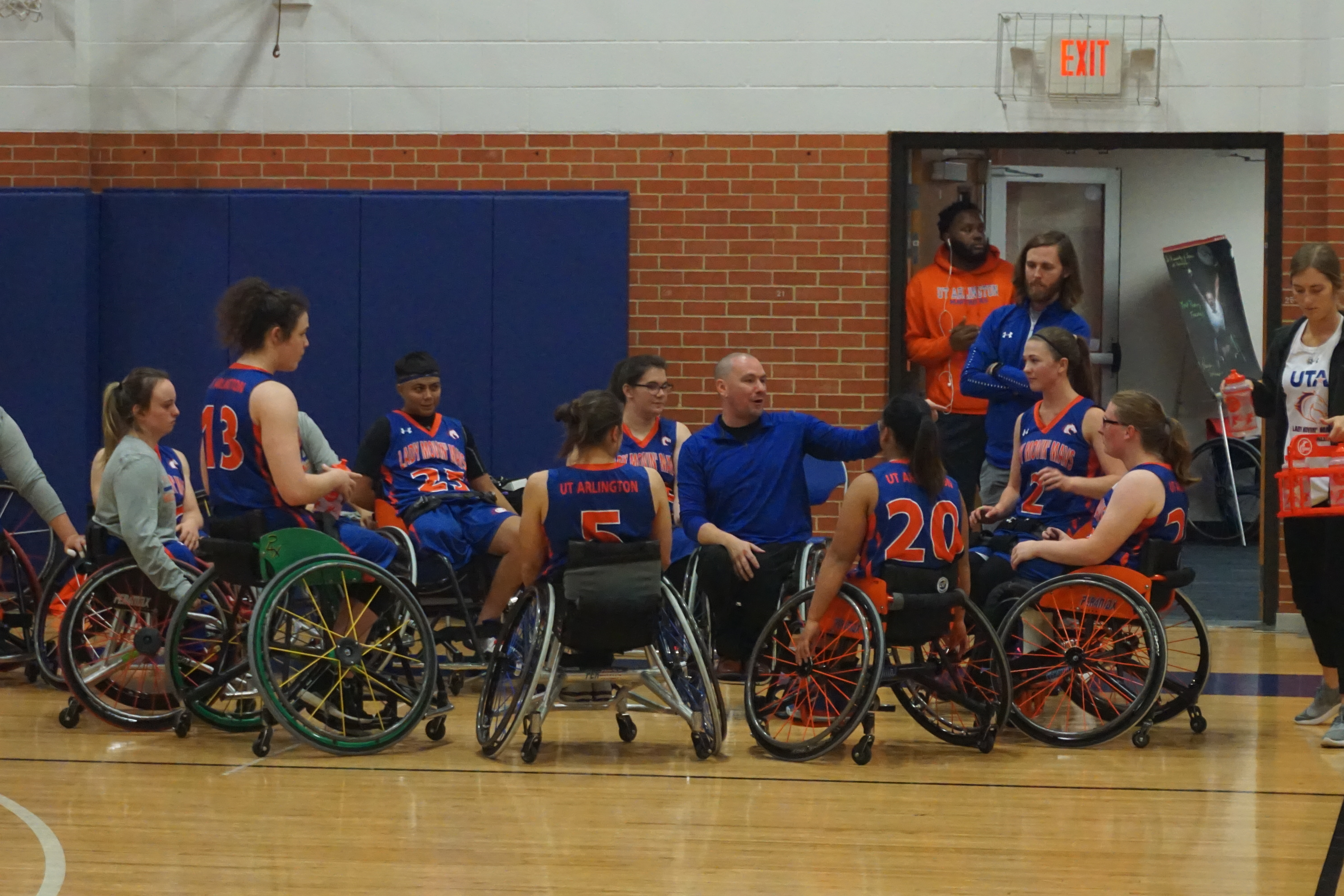
Head coach Jason Nelms with the Lady Movin' Mavs during a timeout in 2019

Jason Nelms has been the head coach of the Lady Movin' Mavs since the establishment of the team in 2013. He is a UTA alumnus and a former member of the Movin' Mavs men's wheelchair basketball team.

== Season-by-season results ==
Statistics overview
| Season | Coach | Overall | Conference | Standing | Postseason |
|---|---|---|---|---|---|
Jason Nelms () (2013–present)
| 2013–2014 | Nelms | | | | NWBAT Disqualified |
| 2014–2015 | Nelms | | | | NIWBT Fourth Place |
| 2015–2016 | Nelms | 19–5 | | | NIWBT Champion |
| 2016–2017 | Nelms | | | | NIWBT Runner-Up |
| 2017–2018 | Nelms | 20–0 | | | NIWBT Champion |
| 2018–2019 | Nelms | | | | NIWBT Runner-Up |
| 2019–2020 | Nelms | | | | Tournament canceled |
| 2020–2021 | Nelms | | | | NIWBT Runner-Up |
| Total: | | | | | |
National champion Postseason invitational champion Conference regular season champion Conference regular season and conference tournament champion Division regular season champion Division regular season and conference tournament champion Conference tournament champion

== See also ==
- UT Arlington Mavericks men's wheelchair basketball
