= Jason Nelms =

American wheelchair basketball player

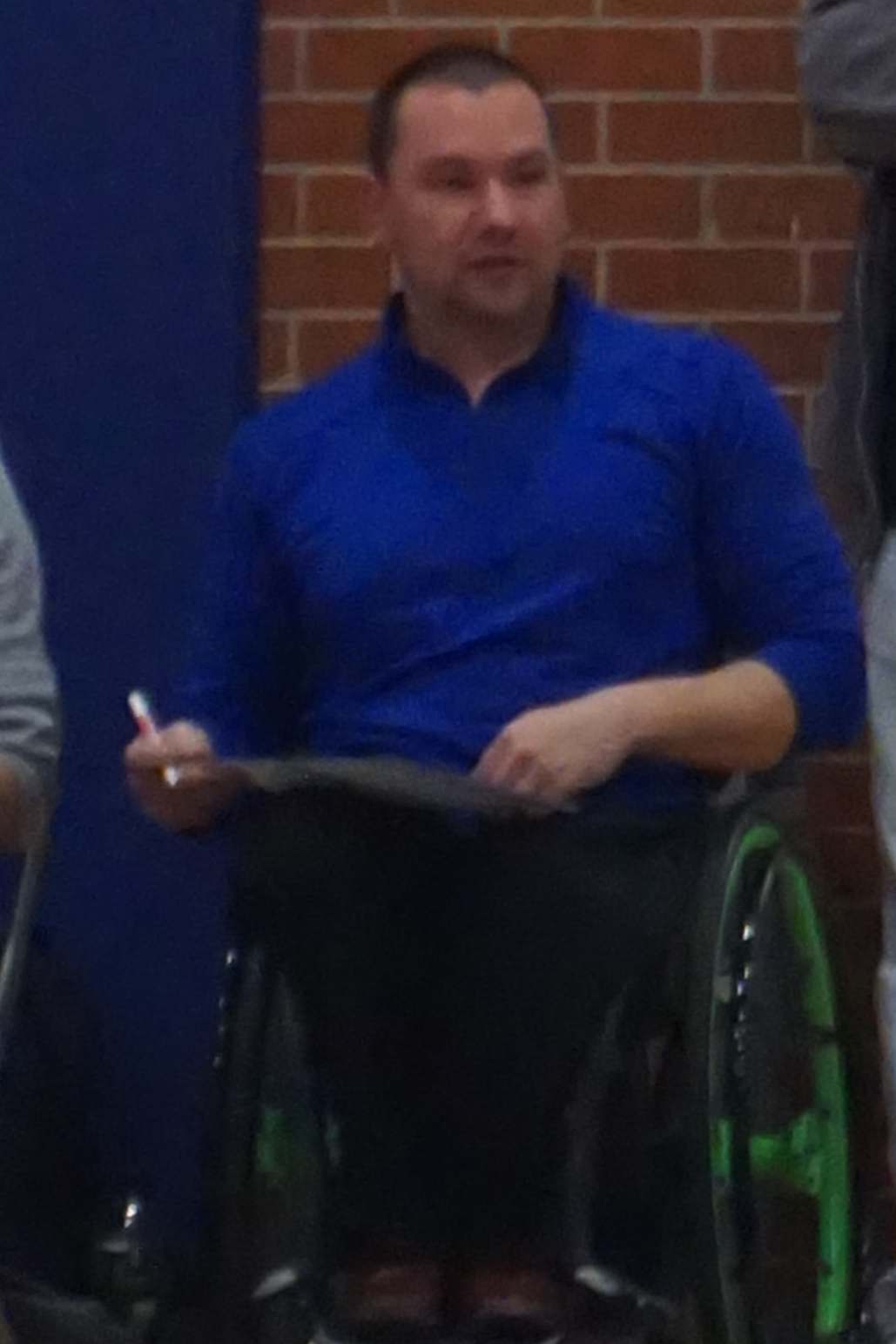
- Nelms in 2020 as head coach of the Lady Movin' Mavs

Personal information
- Born: 1980 (age 45–46) Huntsville, Alabama, U.S.
Medals
Men's wheelchair basketball
Representing United States
Paralympic Games
Bronze medal – third place	2012 London	Team
Parapan American Games
Gold medal – first place	2011 Guadalajara	Team
World Championships
Silver medal – second place	2006 Amsterdam	Team
Bronze medal – third place	2010 Birmingham	Team

Jason Nelms (born 1980) is an American Paralympic wheelchair basketball player from Huntsville, Alabama. He is a 2002 gold medalist at the IWBF World Championship and got a bronze medal in 2010 at the same place. A year later, he was awarded a gold medal at the 2011 Parapan American Games and on 2012 Summer Paralympics he was awarded with another bronze one. He was also a four-time NWBA Champion from 2008 to 2012 (excluding 2009). He has been the head coach of the University of Texas at Arlington Lady Movin' Mavs women's wheelchair basketball team since its establishment in 2013.
