= Hatice Atay =

Turkish wheelchair basketball and para-badminton player (born 1996)

Personal information
- Nationality: Turkish
- Born: 1996 (age 29–30) Turkey

Sport
- Sport: Women's Wheelchair Basketball & Women's Para-badminton
- Disability class: 3.5
- Club: Düziçi ESK
Medal record
Women's wheelchair basketball
Representing Turkey

Hatice Atay (born 1996) is a Turkish wheelchair basketball and para-badminton player. She was a member of the Turkey women's national wheelchair basketball team.

== Club career ==
Atay started playing wheelchair basketball and para-badminton in 2016. In basketball, she has disability class 3.5. She is a member of Düziçi Disabled Sports Club in Osmaniye.

She won second and third place titles in para-badminton in the singles and mixed team events at the Turkish Championships.

== International career ==
Atay was selected to the Turkey women's national under-25 wheelchair basketball team, and played at the 2019 Women's U25 Wheelchair Basketball World Championship held in Suphanburi, Thailand.

She played for the Turkey women's national wheelchair basketball team at the European Wheelchair Basketball Championship in 2019 in Rotterdam, Netherlands.

== Personal life ==
Hatice was born in 1996 with congenital disorder of walking disability.

She married Halit Yaşar Atay in 2017; she had met him during wheelchair basketball training in Osmaniye in 2016, and he had lost both legs after a road accident in 2011. The couple became parents of a baby girl in 2018.

She studied in the School of Physical Education and Sports at Osmaniye Korkut Ata University.

She works as a civil servant in a public institution like her spouse.
