= Kayla Bell =

British wheelchair basketball player

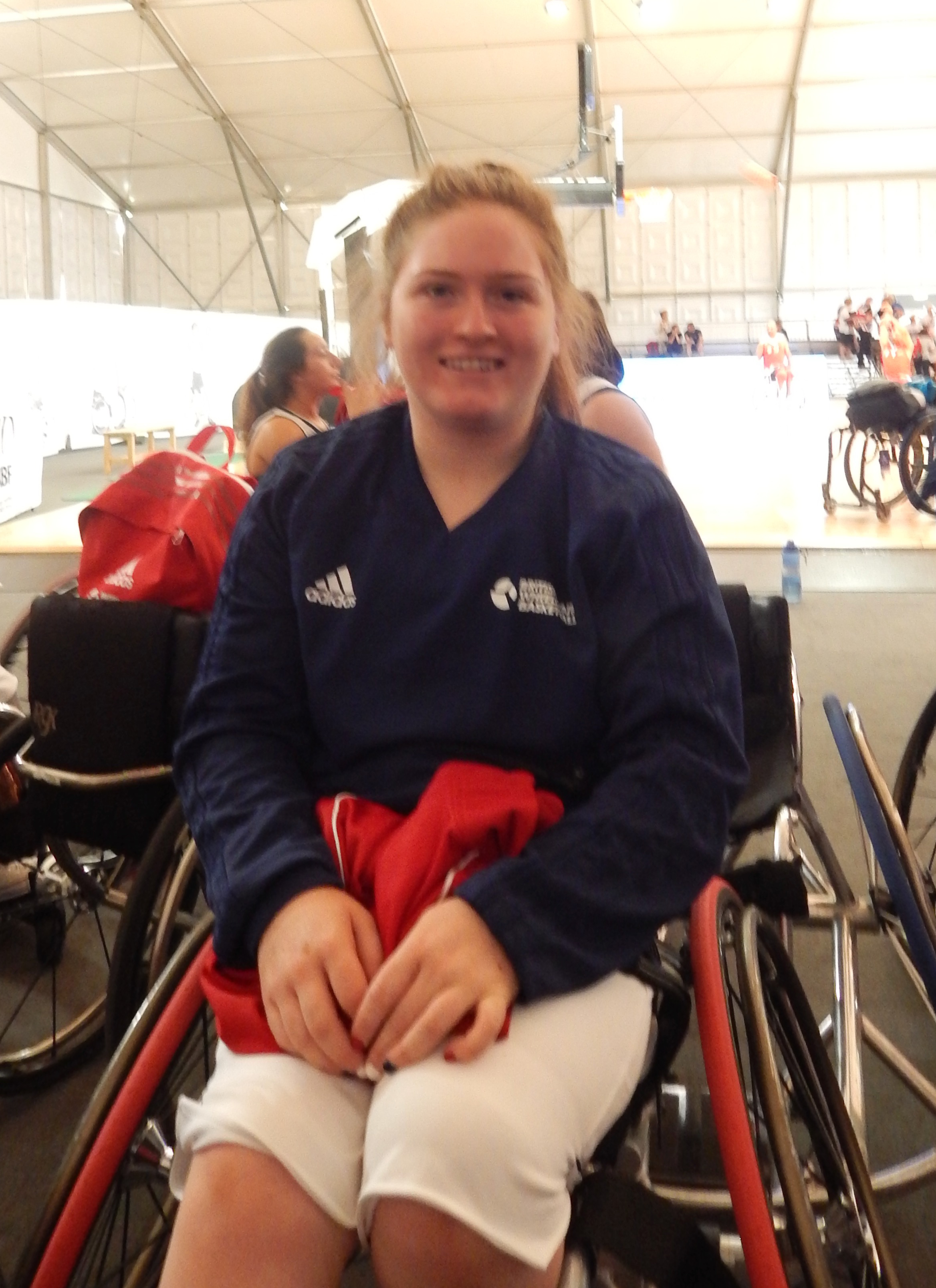
- Kayla Bell at the 2018 Wheelchair Basketball World Championship in Hamburg

Personal information
- Nationality: Great Britain
- Born: 1996 (age 29–30)

Sport
- Country: Great Britain
- Sport: Wheelchair basketball
- Disability class: 1.5
- Event: Women's team
- Club: Sheffield Steelers
Medal record
Women's World Championships
Silver medal – second place	2018 Hamburg, Germany	Women's wheelchair basketball

Michaela (Kayla) Bell (born 1996) is a 1.5 point British wheelchair basketball player who played for Great Britain at the Osaka Cup in Japan in 2017 and 2018. Her first major international tournament was the 2018 Wheelchair Basketball World Championship in Hamburg, where she won silver.

== Biography ==
Michaela (Kayla) Bell comes from Thatcham. She began playing wheelchair basketball at the age of nine after she was introduced to the game by a teaching assistant. She is classified as a 1.5 point player, and initially played for the Thames Valley Kings, which she represented in the Under 15 and Under 19 competitions in the Lord Taverners Junior league. She later represented the South East region in the National Junior Championships, England South in the National School games championships, and played for the Sheffield Steelers. In 2017, she presented the Kings' end of season awards.

In 2016, she was part of the U25 Women's team that won Great Britain's first ever U25 European title. She then played with the senior team at the Osaka Cup in Japan in 2017 and 2018. In 2018 she was part of the team at the 2018 Wheelchair Basketball World Championship Hamburg, Germany. It was her first major tournament, and the team won silver. This was the best-ever performance of the British women's team, which had never made the finals before.

She is a graduate of Worcester University with a BSc degree in business psychology. She received support from Britain's Talented Athlete Scholarship Scheme.

== Achievements ==
- 2018: Silver at the 2018 Wheelchair Basketball World Championship (Hamburg, Germany)
