= Annabelle Lindsay =

Australian wheelchair basketball player

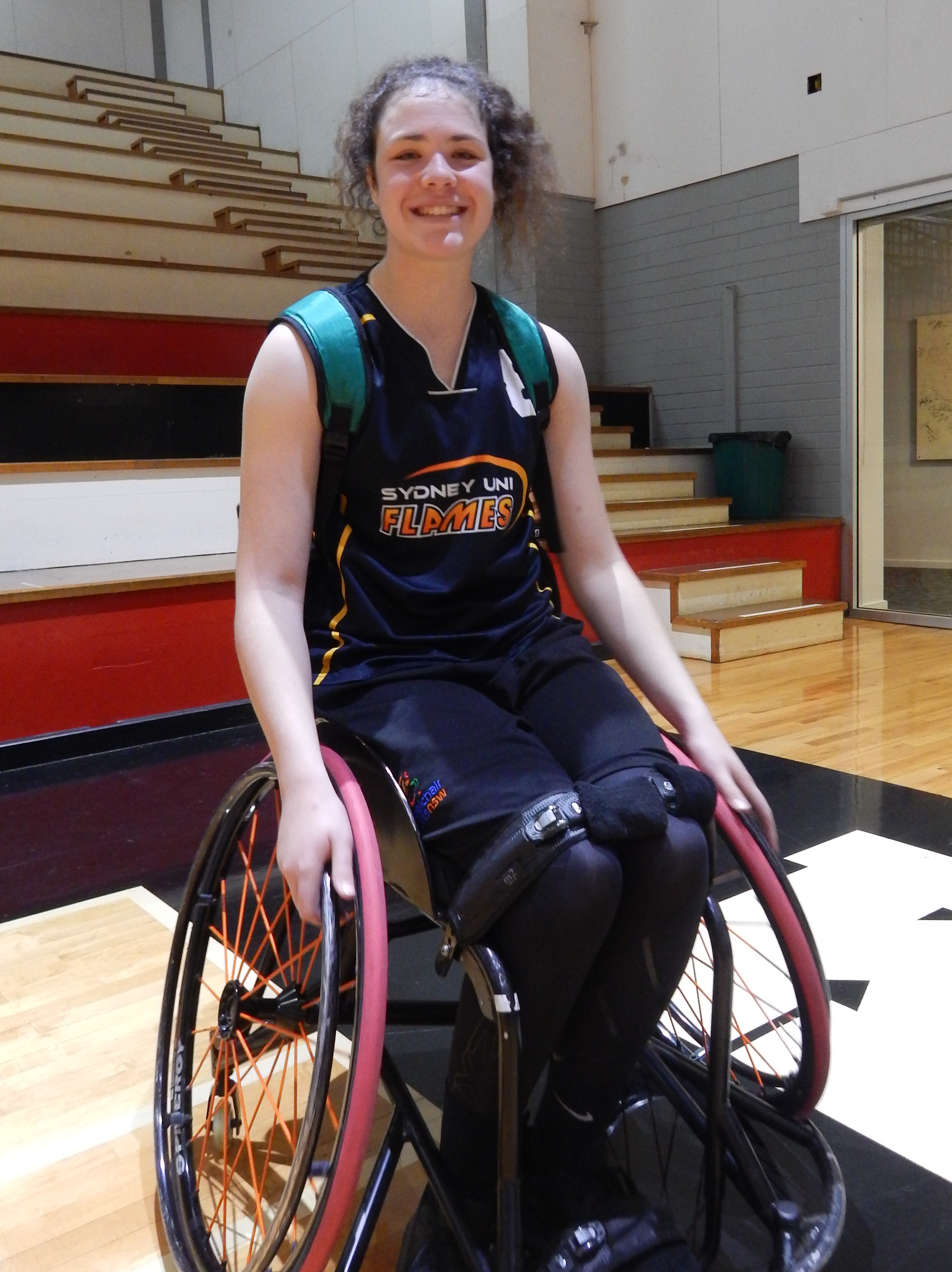
- Playing for the Sydney University Flames at the Kilsyth Sports Centre in Melbourne

Personal information
- Born: 10 February 1998 (age 28)
- Height: 6 ft 2 in (188 cm)

Sport
- Country: Australia
- Sport: Wheelchair basketball
- Position: Forward
- Disability class: 4.5
- Event: Women's team
- College team: University of Texas at Arlington
- Club: Sydney University Flames
Medal record
Wheelchair basketball
U25 Women's World Championships
Silver medal – second place	2019 Suphanburi, Thailand	Women's wheelchair basketball

Annabelle Lindsay (born 10 February 1998) is a 4.5 point Australian wheelchair basketball player. She made her international debut with the Australian women's national wheelchair basketball team (the Gliders) at the Osaka Cup in February 2017. In May 2019, she was part of the U25 National team (the Devils) that won silver at the 2019 Women's U25 Wheelchair Basketball World Championship in Suphanburi, Thailand.

== Biography ==
From 2009 to 2015, Lindsay represented the ACT State Team in the Australian National Championships in her age division, and was co-captain of the Under 14 and Under 16 teams. She played for the Canberra Capitals Academy in the South East Australian Basketball League (SEABL), winning the team's Rising Star award for 2014, and dreamt of one day playing in the WNBA. In 2016, she was awarded a basketball scholarship to play and study at Minot State University in North Dakota in the United States. Her plans unravelled in April 2016, when she suffered a dislocated right knee, and underwent arthroscopy surgery. She was told that she would be playing again in four months, but her knee did not heal as expected after the surgery, leaving her with little cartilage in it, and signs of osteoarthritis. An MRI indicated that she would not be able to play sports like basketball. She attempted a comeback anyway, but this only worsened her knee. She relinquished her scholarship, and took a gap year in which she was a coach for Aussie Hoops, Basketball Australia's program for 5 to 10 year old players, and Basketball ACT's Sporting Schools programs.

In May 2016, a friend sent Lindsay information about the Canberra Chargers, the local wheelchair basketball team. This is a mixed-gender team, open to players with and without disabilities. Playing for the Chargers brought an invitation to play for the Sydney University Flames in the Women's National Wheelchair Basketball League (WNWBL). "I'm playing with an awesome and very talented group of girls who I am able to learn a lot from," she noted, "It's a great experience to be able to play against athletes who I've watched on television playing for the Gliders". That year she was named the WNWBL's Best New Talent.

In January 2017, Lindsay was named to the Gliders team for the Osaka Cup in Japan. In May 2017, she was selected in the Gliders team to play in the World Super Cup in Germany and the Netherlands, and the Continental Clash with Germany, Japan and Great Britain. In October 2017, she played in the 2017 IWBF Asia-Oceania Championships, racking up 27 points and 10 rebounds in her first game, against Iran. She was part of the Gliders line up at the 2018 Wheelchair Basketball World Championship in August 2018, and in May 2019 won a silver medal with the U25 Women's side, known as the Devils, at the 2019 Women's U25 Wheelchair Basketball World Championship in Suphanburi, Thailand.

Lindsay studied Physical Education, teaching at the University of Canberra, and was awarded a sports scholarship for wheelchair basketball under the ACT government's Individual Athlete Program. A sympathetic Minot State University offered her a coaching scholarship for a master's degree, but in October 2017, she was awarded a four-year scholarship to play college wheelchair basketball for the Lady Movin' Mavs at the University of Texas at Arlington, commencing in January 2018. She was their first international wheelchair basketball player. On 17 March 2018, the Movin' Mavs capped off an undefeated season by beating their arch-rivals, the University of Alabama 65–55 to win the national championship. On 16 March 2019, the Movin' Mavs once again faced the University of Alabama in the final, but this time fell short, losing 87–76 in extra time.

In July 2020 she was one of nine paralympic athletes forced into retirement after the International Wheelchair Basketball Federation was forced to align its eligibility criteria with that of the International Paralympic Committee.
