= Atai Ulaan =

Atai Ulaan, in Buryat mythology, is described as the leader of 44 Tenger (sky-gods) of the eastern skies, he is the leader of an army consisting of 6,666 soldiers.

His brother, Han Hormasta, is the leader of the 55 Tenger of the western skies. Known as 'Galta Ulaan', he is a common figure in Mongol mythology and the husband of Mayas Hara Toodei.

Tibetan emperor and central character in the Epic of King Gesar, Abai Geser, opposed him throughout most of the Buryat story. Abai Geser eventually married Atai Ulaan's daughter, Gaguurai Nogoon. Atai Ulaan had three sons—Sagaan Hasar Buhe, Shara Hasar Buhe, and Hara Hasar Buhe —each of them was supposedly wrestled and defeated by their father's brother's eldest son so that he could marry the Buryat, god of winter and member of the Tenger of the western sky, Segeen Sebdeg.

== Powers ==
Atai Ulaan's power is shown to exceed his martial prowess and his militant power is reported to have "made thirteen magics dance on his palm and twenty-three magics dance on his fingers".

Atai Ulaan's nephew, Han Hormasta's son "Bukhe Beligte, threw a great black spear that smashed the big toe of Atai Ulaan’s right foot. Malevolent disease spirits came out of the remains of Atai Ulaan and tormented humans".

This passage suggests that the tale of Atai Ulaan's impalement may have been the mythological origin of the ailment gout, which most commonly afflicts the big toe. The disease-spirits that were released are named Gal Nurma Khan, Sherem Minata Khan, cf. the "Sherem" in the Book of Jacob, chapter 7 -- Yaʻqōb (Jacob) wrestled with the angel in like manner as did Zasa Mergen Baatar, Abarga Sesen, Loir Hara Lobsogoldoi, and the "Yonhoboi sisters of Loir Hara Lobsogoldoi". This sparks the conflict with Abai Geser, who descends upon earth to defeat the hordes of demons and foul spirits, unleashed from Atai Ulaan's toe in the Epic of King Gesar.

== Bibliography ==
- Sarangerel (Julie Ann Stewart): Chosen by the Spirits: Following Your Shamanic Calling. Destiny Books, Rochester (VT), 2001.ISBN 978-0892818617
