= Wheelchair basketball at the 2024 Summer Paralympics – Men's team rosters =

Wheelchair Basketball teams at 2024 Paralympics

This is a list of players that participated in the men's wheelchair basketball competition at the 2024 Summer Paralympics.

== Group A ==
=== Canada ===
The following is the Canada roster in the men's wheelchair basketball tournament of the 2024 Summer Paralympics.

Canada men's national wheelchair basketball team - 2024 Summer Paralympics roster
Players
Coaches

No.	Name	Age – Date of birth	Pts.
4	Nikola Gončin	32 – 19 December 1991	4.5
5	Garrett Ostepchuk	24 – 12 March 2000	2.0
6	Robert Hedges	44 – 5 January 1980	2.5
7	Vincent Dallaire	29 – 7 March 1995	1.5
8	Blaise Mutware	30 – 14 May 1994	3.5
9	Colin Higgins	33 – 23 May 1991	4.5
10	Lee Melymick	29 – 9 January 1995	1.0
11	Chad Jassman	40 – 16 September 1983	1.5
12	Patrick Anderson	45 – 22 August 1979	4.5
13	Jonathan Vermette	33 – 4 March 1991	1.0
14	Tyler Miller	40 – 24 June 1984	1.5
15	Reed De'Aeth	22 – 20 August 2002	4.5

Head coach

Matteo Feriani

Assistant coach(es)

Nicolas Paimer

Legend

- Age - describes age on 29 August 2024

=== Germany ===
The following is the Germany roster in the men's wheelchair basketball tournament of the 2024 Summer Paralympics

Germany men's national wheelchair basketball team - 2024 Summer Paralympics roster
Players
Coaches

No.	Name	Age – Date of birth	Pts.
5	Nico Dreimuller	26 – 10 December 1997	2.0
6	Matthias Guntner	25 – 10 November 1998	4.5
8	Tobias Hell	24 – 17 May 2000	1.0
9	Lukas Glossner	24 – 25 March 2000	1.0
10	Jan Haller	35 – 1 October 1988	2.0
11	Jan Sadler	31 – 9 July 1993	3.0
12	Jens-Eike Albrecht	33 – 2 June 1991	3.0
13	Thomas Boehme	33 – 24 June 1991	3.0
14	Aliaksandr Halouski	37 – 30 April 1987	4.5
15	Alexander Budde	24 – 20 April 2000	3.5
16	Thomas Reier	24 – 25 June 2000	4.5
18	Julian Lammering	20 – 28 January 2004	3.5

Head coach

Michael Engel

Assistant coach(es)

Martin Kluck

Legend

- Age - describes age on 29 August 2024

=== Great Britain ===
The following is the Great Britain roster in the men's wheelchair basketball tournament of the 2024 Summer Paralympics.

Name	Hometown	Current Club	Classification
Abdi Jama	Liverpool	Amivel Reyes Gutierrez	1.0
Terry Bywater	Middlesbrough	CD Ilunion	4.5
Harry Brown	Halifax	Amiab Albacete	2.5
Peter Cusack	Coventry	UCAM Murcia	3.5
Greg Warburton	Leigh	CD Ilunion	2.0
Phil Pratt	Cardiff	Amiab Albacete	3.0
Kyle Marsh	Wolverhampton	Amivel Reyes Gutierrez	2.0
Jim Palmer	Chelmsford	Rhine River Rhinos	1.0
Simon Brown	Kingsbury	Amiab Albacete	2.0
Ben Fox	Swindon	Amiab Albacete	3.5
Lee Fryer	Wakefield	UCAM Murcia	4.0
Lee Manning	Peterborough	Amiab Albacete	4.5

=== France ===
The following is the France roster in the men's wheelchair basketball tournament of the 2024 Summer Paralympics

France men's national wheelchair basketball team - 2024 Summer Paralympics roster
Players
Coaches

No.	Name	Age – Date of birth	Pts.
4	Remi Bayle	34 – 28 September 1989	2.5
5	Alexis Ramonet	28 – 8 October 1995	4.0
7	Audrey Cayol	43 – 16 July 1981	1.5
8	Jordan Luce	30 – 30 November 1993	4.5
9	Soufyane Mehiaoui	40 – 3 October 1983	3.0
10	Jerome Laureri	38 – 31 May 1986	1.0
25	Christophe Carlier	38 – 4 April 1986	3.0
26	Jerome Duran	43 – 10 May 1981	2.0
29	Louis Hardouin	26 – 19 November 1997	2.5
64	Nicolas Jouanserre	39 – 1 March 1985	4.5
92	Ibrahim Guirassy	42 – 17 July 1982	1.0
93	Mamady Traore	21 – 11 March 2003	4.0

Head coach

Franck Bornerand

Assistant coach(es)

Steve Caine

Legend

- Age - describes age on 29 August 2024

== Group B ==
=== Australia ===
The following is the Australia roster in the men's wheelchair basketball tournament of the 2024 Summer Paralympics.

Australia men's national wheelchair basketball team - 2024 Summer Paralympics roster
Players
Coaches

No.	Name	Age – Date of birth	Pts.
1	Samuel White	37 – 19 June 1987	1.0
2	Frank Pinder	23 – 17 December 2000	1
3	Jaylen Brown	19 – 22 December 2004	4
4	Eithen Leard	18 – 31 August 2005	2
5	Bill Latham	34 – 29 October 1989	4.0
7	Shaun Norris	39 – 2 April 1985	3.0
9	Tristan Knowles	41 – 25 April 1983	4.0
10	Jannik Blair	32 – 3 February 1992	1.0
11	Tom O'Neill-Thorne	27 – 8 April 1997	3.0
13	Luke Pople	33 – 6 June 1991	1.5
15	Tom McHugh	22 – 13 March 2002	4.5
18	Phil Evans	33 – 18 September 1990	2

Head coach

Brad Ness

Assistant coach(es)

Brett Stibners, Darren Allie, Luke Mitchell

Legend

- Age - describes age on 29 August 2021

=== Netherlands ===
Netherlands men's national wheelchair basketball team - 2024 Summer Paralympics roster
Players
Coaches

No.	Name	Age – Date of birth	Pts.
0	Frank de Jong	39 – 15 March 1985	1.0
1	Robin Poggenwisch	35 – 24 July 1989	3.0
2	Mendel Op den Orth	28 – 23 January 1996	4.0
3	Anil Cegil	24 – 17 November 1999	1.5
7	Patrick de Boer	33 – 5 December 1990	3.0
11	Mattijs Bellers	32 – 6 September 1992	4.5
12	Gijs Even	29 – 22 September 1994	4.5
15	Quinten Zantinge	24 – 31 January 2000	3.0
17	Arie Twigt	24 – 20 May 2000	3.5
21	Camilo van Trijp	33 – 30 August 1990	1.0
23	Mustafa Korkmaz	36 – 18 January 1988	3.0
38	Joeri van Liere	38 – 14 April 1986	1.5

Head coach

Cees van Rootselaar

Assistant coach(es)

Anton de Rooij

Legend

- Age - describes age on 29 August 2024

=== Spain ===
Spain men's national wheelchair basketball team - 2024 Summer Paralympics roster
Players
Coaches

No.	Name	Age – Date of birth	Pts.
5	Daniel Stix	27 – 24 June 1997	1.5
7	Pablo Zarzuela	37 – 2 April 1987	3.0
8	Francisco Sánchez Lara	35 – 11 August 1989	1.0
9	Alejandro Zarzuela	37 – 2 April 1987	3.0
10	Amadou Diallo	32 – 4 January 1992	3.0
11	Jordi Ruiz	33 – 2 December 1990	2.5
13	Asier García	43 – 11 June 1981	4.0
16	Óscar Onrubia	24 – 11 May 2000	1.5
22	Manuel Lorenzo	24 – 22 September 1999	3.0
24	Ignacio Ortega	23 – 30 October 2000	4.0
55	Eduardo Prieto	37 – 5 September 1986	4.0
90	Alexis Ruiz	33 – 17 December 1990	3.5

Head coach

Abraham Carrión

Assistant coach(es)

Rafael Muiño

Legend

- Age - describes age on 29 August 2024

=== United States ===
The following is the United States roster in the men's wheelchair basketball tournament of the 2024 Summer Paralympics.

United States men's national wheelchair basketball team - 2024 Summer Paralympics roster
Players
Coaches

No.	Name	Age – Date of birth	Pts.
2	Jacob Williams	33 – 2 August 1991	2.5
4	Talen Jourdan	24 – 25 October 1999	1.0
8	Brian Bell	35 – 24 February 1989	4.5
11	Steve Serio	36 – 8 September 1987	3.5
14	Paul Schulte	45 – 5 March 1979	3.0
15	Nate Hinze	36 – 12 June 1988	4.5
16	Trevon Jenifer	35 – 7 September 1988	2.5
24	AJ Fitzpatrick	19 – 28 August 2004	3.0
25	Jorge Salazar	34 – 7 December 1989	3.5
32	Fabian Romo	27 – 22 January 1997	4.0
33	John Boie	33 – 11 February 1991	1.0
44	Jeromie Meyer	27 – 11 April 1997	2.0

Head coach

Robb Taylor

Assistant coach(es)

Scott Meyer

Legend

- Age - describes age on 28 August 2024
