= Wheelchair basketball at the 2020 Summer Paralympics – Men's team rosters =

This is a list of players that participated in the men's wheelchair basketball competition at the 2020 Summer Paralympics.

== Group A ==
=== Canada ===
The following is the Canada roster in the men's wheelchair basketball tournament of the 2020 Summer Paralympics.

Canada men's national wheelchair basketball team - 2020 Summer Paralympics roster
Players
Coaches

No.	Name	Age – Date of birth	Pts.
4	Nikola Goncin	29 – 19 December 1991	4.5
5	Deion Green	31 – 28 April 1990	3.5
6	Robert Hedges	41 – 5 January 1980	2.5
7	Vincent Dallaire	26 – 7 March 1995	1.5
8	Blaise Mutware	27 – 14 May 1994	3.5
9	Colin Higgins	30 – 23 May 1991	4.5
10	Lee Melymick	26 – 9 January 1995	1.0
11	Chad Jassman	37 – 16 September 1983	1.5
12	Patrick Anderson	42 – 22 August 1979	4.5
13	Jonathan Vermette	30 – 4 March 1991	1.0
14	Tyler Miller	37 – 24 June 1984	1.5
15	Garrett Ostepchuk	21 – 12 March 2000	2.0

Head coach

Matteo Feriani

Assistant coach(es)

Joey Johnson, Nicolas Palmer

Legend

- Age - describes age on 24 August 2021

=== Colombia ===
The following is the Colombia roster in the men's wheelchair basketball tournament of the 2020 Summer Paralympics.

Colombia men's national wheelchair basketball team - 2020 Summer Paralympics roster
Players
Coaches

No.	Name	Age – Date of birth	Pts.
3	Raul Vega	28 – 14 April 1993	1.0
4	Hector Garces	37 – 10 December 1983	3.5
5	Guillermo Alzate	38 – 29 May 1983	1.5
9	Andres Florez	32 – 10 September 1988	1.0
10	Jose Leep	43 – 15 August 1978	3.0
14	Daniel Diaz	31 – 17 May 1990	4.5
18	Juan Escobar	20 – 23 September 2000	3.5
19	Jhon Hernandez	28 – 7 October 1992	3.5
20	Nelson Sanz	47 – 26 March 1974	4.5
23	Jhoan Vargas	34 – 4 May 1987	2.0
30	Rodrigo Perez	32 – 13 April 1989	4.0
33	Joymar Granados	26 – 22 May 1995	2.5

Head coach

Lucia Do Nascimento Cardoso Ana

Assistant coach(es)

Alfonso Well de Las Salas Elkin

Legend

- Age - describes age on 24 August 2021

=== Japan ===
The following is the Japan roster in the men's wheelchair basketball tournament of the 2020 Summer Paralympics.

Japan men's national wheelchair basketball team - 2020 Summer Paralympics roster
Players
Coaches

No.	Name	Age – Date of birth	Pts.
1	Akira Toyoshima	32 – 16 February 1989	2.0
2	Renshi Chokai	22 – 2 February 1999	2.5
6	Rin Kawahara	24 – 3 December 1996	1.5
7	Takuya Furusawa	25 – 8 May 1996	3.0
8	Ryuga Akaishi	20 – 11 September 2000	2.5
10	Tetsuya Miyajima	32 – 29 November 1988	4.0
11	Kiyoshi Fujisawa	35 – 26 July 1986	2.0
13	Reo Fujimoto	37 – 22 September 1983	4.5
21	Yoshinobu Takamatsu	21 – 20 November 1999	4.0
25	Kei Akita	31 – 22 February 1990	3.5
26	Takayoshi Iwai	25 – 28 June 1996	1.0
55	Hiroaki Kozai	33 – 14 July 1988	3.5

Head coach

Kazuyuki Kyoya

Assistant coach(es)

Shimpei Oikawa

Legend

- Age - describes age on 24 August 2021

=== South Korea ===
The following is the Republic of Korea roster in the men's wheelchair basketball tournament of the 2020 Summer Paralympics.

Republic of Korea men's national wheelchair basketball team - 2020 Summer Paralympics roster
Players
Coaches

No.	Name	Age – Date of birth	Pts.	Club	Ctr.
4	Kim Ho-yong	49 – 3 March 1972	3.0	Jeju	(South Korea)
6	Hwang Woo-sung	38 – 22 November 1982	2.0	Jeju	(South Korea)
7	Kim Tae-ok	33 – 25 August 1987	2.5	Seoul	(South Korea)
10	Oh Dong-suk	33 – 11 November 1987	2.0	Seoul	(South Korea)
11	Kwak Jun-seong	31 – 8 December 1989	1.0	Seoul	(South Korea)
12	Yang Dong-gil	29 – 11 September 1991	4.0	Seoul	(South Korea)
16	Lee Youn-joo	36 – 29 November 1984	3.5	Seoul	(South Korea)
23	Cho Seung-hyun	37 – 1 December 1983	4.0	Chuncheon	(South Korea)
24	Lee Chi-won	41 – 12 March 1980	2.5	Chuncheon	(South Korea)
39	Kim Sang-yeol	38 – 15 April 1983	4.0	Chuncheon	(South Korea)
40	Gim Dong-hyeon	32 – 24 September 1988	4.0	Jeju	(South Korea)
44	Lee Byoung-jai	40 – 13 July 1981	1.0	Chuncheon	(South Korea)

Head coach

Ko Kwang-yub

Assistant coach(es)

Kim Young-moo

Legend

- Age - describes age on 24 August 2021

=== Spain ===
The following is the Spain roster in the men's wheelchair basketball tournament of the 2020 Summer Paralympics.

Spain men's national wheelchair basketball team - 2020 Summer Paralympics roster
Players
Coaches

No.	Name	Age – Date of birth	Pts.
5	Daniel Stix Soto	24 – 24 June 1997	1.5
7	Jesus Zarzuela Beltran Pablo	34 – 2 April 1987	3.0
8	Francisco Sanchez Lara	32 – 11 August 1989	1.0
9	Alejandro Zarzuela Beltran	34 – 2 April 1987	3.0
10	Amadou Diallo Diouf	29 – 4 January 1992	3.0
11	Jordi Ruiz Jordan	30 – 2 December 1990	2.5
13	Asier Garcia Pereiro	40 – 11 June 1981	4.0
14	David Mouriz Dopico	38 – 31 December 1982	2.5
16	Oscar Onrubia Gonzalez	21 – 11 May 2000	1.5
24	Ignacio Ortega Lafuente	20 – 30 October 2000	4.0
28	Manuel Lorenzo Diaz	21 – 22 September 1999	3.0
51	Agustín Alejos Alonso	33 – 8 November 1987	4.5

Head coach

Oscar Trigo Diez

Assistant coach(es)

Francisco Lopez Martinez, Javier Carvajal Pichel

Legend

- Age - describes age on 24 August 2021

=== Turkey ===
The following is the Turkey roster in the men's wheelchair basketball tournament of the 2020 Summer Paralympics.

Turkey men's national wheelchair basketball team - 2020 Summer Paralympics roster
Players
Coaches

No.	Name	Age – Date of birth	Pts.
3	Deniz Acar	45 – 9 January 1976	2.5
5	Ozgur Gurbulak	40 – 30 April 1981	4.0
6	Mucahit Gunaydin	22 – 25 March 1999	4.0
7	Ahmet Efeturk	25 – 31 August 1995	4.0
9	Ugur Toprak	29 – 19 July 1992	3.0
10	Ismail Ar	35 – 28 November 1985	1.5
11	Fikri Gundogdu	36 – 15 June 1985	1.0
15	Selim Sayak	35 – 26 January 1986	2.5
35	Ferit Gumus	40 – 10 January 1981	3.0
36	Samet Toptas	32 – 1 November 1988	4.5
47	Ridvan Aksoy	21 – 2 February 2000	1.0
52	Volkan Gulem	23 – 16 February 1998	2.0

Head coach

Ahmet Akin

Assistant coach(es)

Erdinc Kilic, Emrah Buken Ozgur

Legend

- Age - describes age on 24 August 2021

== Group B ==
=== Algeria ===
The following is the Algeria roster in the men's wheelchair basketball tournament of the 2020 Summer Paralympics.

Algeria men's national wheelchair basketball team - 2020 Summer Paralympics roster
Players
Coaches

No.	Name	Age – Date of birth	Pts.
4	Oussama Baghradji	24 – 5 November 1996	1.5
5	Abdennour Benredouane	30 – 16 August 1991	4.0
6	Ayoub Badrane	27 – 20 March 1994	2.5
7	Rafik Mansouri	40 – 7 October 1980	2.0
8	Mostefa Abassi	43 – 25 September 1977	2.5
9	Nabil Guedoun	44 – 4 August 1977	4.0
10	Hakim Badache	35 – 3 August 1986	4.0
11	Samir Ladjadjat	40 – 31 March 1981	3.5
12	Abderraouf Abbad	34 – 27 October 1986	1.0
13	Omar Zidi	37 – 23 January 1984	4.0
14	Abdelkarim Megueddem	35 – 4 June 1986	3.0
15	Bilel Ayache	40 – 2 June 1981	3.5

Head coach

Mustapha Brahimi

Assistant coach(es)

Boualem Benazouz

Legend

- Age - describes age on 24 August 2021

=== Australia ===
Found team: Australia The following is the Australia roster in the men's wheelchair basketball tournament of the 2020 Summer Paralympics.

Australia men's national wheelchair basketball team - 2020 Summer Paralympics roster
Players
Coaches

No.	Name	Age – Date of birth	Pts.
1	Samuel White	34 – 19 June 1987	1.0
2	Jeremy Tyndall	25 – 5 April 1996	1.5
5	Bill Latham	31 – 29 October 1989	4.0
6	Brett Stibners	42 – 25 June 1979	4.0
7	Shaun Norris	36 – 2 April 1985	3.0
8	Kim Robins	33 – 12 June 1988	3.0
9	Tristan Knowles	38 – 25 April 1983	4.0
10	Jannik Blair	29 – 3 February 1992	1.0
11	Tom O'Neill-Thorne	24 – 8 April 1997	3.0
12	Matthew McShane	30 – 1 November 1990	1.5
15	Michael Auprince	28 – 21 February 1993	4.0
33	John McPhail	31 – 30 December 1989	3.0

Head coach

Craig Friday

Assistant coach(es)

Brad Ness, Grant Mizens

Legend

- Age - describes age on 24 August 2021

=== Germany ===
The following is the Germany roster in the men's wheelchair basketball tournament of the 2020 Summer Paralympics.

Germany men's national wheelchair basketball team - 2020 Summer Paralympics roster
Players
Coaches

No.	Name	Age – Date of birth	Pts.
4	Phillip Schorp	27 – 8 October 1993	1.0
5	Nico Dreimueller	23 – 10 December 1997	2.0
6	Matthias Guentner	22 – 10 November 1998	4.5
7	Christopher Huber	25 – 9 October 1995	1.0
8	Andre Bienek	34 – 31 October 1986	3.0
9	Tobias Hell	21 – 17 May 2000	1.0
10	Jan Haller	32 – 1 October 1988	2.0
11	Jan Sadler	28 – 9 July 1993	3.0
12	Eicke Albrecht Jens	30 – 2 June 1991	3.0
13	Thomas Boehme	30 – 24 June 1991	3.0
14	Aliaksandr Halouski	34 – 30 April 1987	4.5
15	Joseph Bestwick	36 – 1 December 1984	4.5

Head coach

Nicolai Zeltinger

Assistant coach(es)

Martin Kluck

Legend

- Age - describes age on 24 August 2021

=== Great Britain ===
The following is the Great Britain roster in the men's wheelchair basketball tournament of the 2020 Summer Paralympics.

Great Britain men's national wheelchair basketball team - 2020 Summer Paralympics roster
Players
Coaches

No.	Name	Age – Date of birth	Pts.
4	Gaz Choudhry	36 – 23 June 1985	4.0
7	Terry Bywater	38 – 28 February 1983	4.5
9	Harry Brown	27 – 21 June 1994	2.5
10	Abdi Jama	38 – 1 November 1982	1.0
12	Gregg Warburton	24 – 19 November 1996	2.0
13	Ian Sagar	39 – 29 March 1982	3.0
14	Lee Manning	31 – 11 January 1990	4.5
15	Ben Fox	26 – 16 August 1995	3.5
16	James Palmer	24 – 23 April 1997	1.0
17	James Macsorley	26 – 13 February 1995	2.0
18	Billy Bridge	26 – 8 August 1995	3.0
20	Lewis Edwards	23 – 6 July 1998	3.0

Head coach

Gaz Choudhry

Assistant coach(es)

Lee Manning

Legend

- Age - describes age on 24 August 2021

=== Iran ===
The following is the Iran roster in the men's wheelchair basketball tournament of the 2020 Summer Paralympics.

Islamic Rep. of Iran men's national wheelchair basketball team - 2020 Summer Paralympics roster
Players
Coaches

No.	Name	Age – Date of birth	Pts.
4	Faleh Ayashi	33 – 23 September 1987	2.0
5	Hassan Abdi	35 – 22 November 1985	2.0
6	Amirreza Ahmadi	20 – 16 October 2000	3.5
7	Mohsen Tolouei Tamardash	36 – 5 April 1985	3.5
8	Vahid Saadatpoormoghadam	37 – 20 August 1984	2.5
9	Danial Zakeri Dehvosta	33 – 18 April 1988	1.0
10	Mohammad Mohammad Nezhad	29 – 30 January 1992	1.0
11	Abdoljalil Gharanjik	34 – 26 December 1986	1.5
12	Mohammadhassan Sayari	24 – 17 August 1997	4.0
13	Reza Eivazi	22 – 2 January 1999	4.0
14	Mojtaba Kamali	22 – 9 October 1998	4.5
15	Iman Bagzadehfard	34 – 11 February 1987	4.0

Head coach

Abbas Aghakoucheki

Assistant coach(es)

Kamal Eshgh

Legend

- Age - describes age on 24 August 2021

=== United States ===
The following is the United States roster in the men's wheelchair basketball tournament of the 2020 Summer Paralympics.

United States men's national wheelchair basketball team - 2020 Summer Paralympics roster
Players
Coaches

No.	Name	Age – Date of birth	Pts.
1	Jorge Sanchez	29 – 3 October 1991	4.0
2	Jacob Williams	30 – 2 August 1991	2.5
4	Joshua Turek	42 – 12 April 1979	3.5
5	Michael Paye	38 – 24 March 1983	3.0
6	Matt Lesperance	34 – 23 May 1987	1.0
7	Ryan Neiswender	27 – 11 May 1994	2.0
8	Brian Bell	32 – 24 February 1989	4.5
9	Matt Scott	36 – 27 March 1985	3.5
11	Steve Serio	33 – 8 September 1987	3.5
15	Nate Hinze	33 – 12 June 1988	4.5
16	Trevon Jenifer	32 – 7 September 1988	2.5
33	John Boie	30 – 11 February 1991	1.0

Head coach

Ron Lykins

Assistant coach(es)

Robert Taylor, Christina Schwab

Legend

- Age - describes age on 24 August 2021
