= Wheelchair basketball at the 2024 Summer Paralympics – Men's tournament =

2024 Summer Paralympics events

Wheelchair basketball at the XVII Paralympic Games
- Venue: Bercy Arena
- Dates: 29 August – 7 September 2024
- Competitors: 96 from 8 nations

Medalists
1st place, gold medalist(s)		United States
2nd place, silver medalist(s)		Great Britain
3rd place, bronze medalist(s)		Germany

The 2024 Summer Paralympics men's tournament in Paris began on 29 August and ended on 7 September 2024. The matches were played at the Bercy Arena. This was the fifteenth edition of the tournament since the tournament debut at the 1968 Summer Paralympics in Tel Aviv.

Eight teams were separated into two groups of four to determine the ranking for matches in the knockout stage of the competition. From there it was a knockout format which would lead to the gold medal match.

== Competition schedule ==
G	Group stage	¼	Quarter-finals	½	Semi-finals	B	Bronze medal match	GM	Gold medal match

Date Event	Thu 29 Aug	Fri 30 Aug	Sat 31 Aug	Sun 1 Sep	Mon 2 Sep	Tue 3 Sep	Wed 4 Sep	Thu 5 Sep	Fri 6 Sep	Sat 7 Sep	
Men	G	G	G	G	G	1/4		1/2		B	GM

== Qualification ==
The top four nations earn sports for their Zones, the winners of the zonal championships will qualify for the Paralympics. Teams are invited to the repechage tournament if the team hasn't earned a quota based on their zonal place rankings via the World Championships. The host nation and the repechage host are also invited to this tournament if they haven't already qualified.

Means of qualification	Date	Venue	Berths	Qualified
2023 European Para Championships	8–20 August 2023	(Netherlands) Rotterdam	2	Great Britain; Spain
2023 Parapan American Games	17–26 November 2023	(Chile) Santiago	1	United States
2024 IWBF Asia-Oceania Championships	12–20 January 2024	(Thailand) Bangkok	1	Australia
2024 IWBF Men's Repechage	12–15 April 2024	(France) Antibes	4	Canada; France; Germany; Netherlands
Total			8	

== Preliminary round ==
=== Group A ===
Pos	Team	Pld	W	L	PF	PA	PD	Pts	Qualification
1	Great Britain	3	3	0	249	163	+86	6	Quarter-finals
2	Canada	3	2	1	209	208	+1	5	Quarter-finals
3	Germany	3	1	2	179	208	−29	4	Quarter-finals
4	France (H)	3	0	3	182	240	−58	3	Quarter-finals

Source: Paris 2024
Rules for classification: 1) Points; 2) Head-to-head results; 3) Points difference; 4) Points scored.
(H) Hosts

29 August 2024
10:30

Report

Great Britain	76–55	Germany
Scoring by quarter: 18–8, 14–17, 20–17, 24–13
Pts: Warburton 24; Rebs: Manning 10; Asts: Pratt 18		Pts: Güntner 19; Rebs: Halouski 9 Asts: Böhme 10

Bercy Arena, Paris
Attendance: 12.799
Referees: Darrell Hargreaves

30 August 2024
18:15

Report

France	68–83	Canada
Scoring by quarter: 20–26, 21–13, 13–22, 14–22
Pts: Jouanserre 38; Rebs: Bayle, Jouanserre 6 Asts: Mehiaoui 6		Pts: Higgins 38; Rebs: Anderson 12; Asts: Anderson 13

Bercy Arena, Paris
Attendance: 12.726
Referees: Krunoslav Peić

31 August 2024
12:45

Report

Canada	58–88	Great Britain
Scoring by quarter: 14–29, 19–21, 15–24, 10–14
Pts: Higgins 14; Rebs: Gončin 6 Asts: three players 3		Pts: Pratt 20; Rebs: Manning 9 Asts: Warburton, Pratt 10

Bercy Arena, Paris
Attendance: 12.761
Referees: Linas Radykas

31 August 2024
21:30

Report

Germany	72–64	France
Scoring by quarter: 17–19, 19–15, 14–17, 22–13
Pts: Güntner 22; Rebs: Güntner 11; Asts: Böhme 8		Pts: Jouanserre 22; Rebs: Mehiaoui 8 Asts: Mehiaoui 10

Bercy Arena, Paris
Attendance: 12.778
Referees: Gustavo Mathias

2 September 2024
16:00

Report

Germany	52–68	Canada
Scoring by quarter: 11-16, 13-21, 18-27, 10-4
Pts: Güntner, Böhme 17; Rebs: Güntner 11; Asts: Böhme 4		Pts: Anderson 17; Rebs: Gončin 9 Asts: Higgins 6

Bercy Arena, Paris
Attendance: 8,891
Referees: Shunsuke Nikaido

2 September 2024
19:15

Report

France	50–85	Great Britain
Scoring by quarter: 13-21, 14-16, 15-24, 8-24
Pts: Carlier 10; Rebs: Carlier 8 Asts: Mehiaoui 7		Pts: Warburton 20; Rebs: Manning 9 Asts: Pratt 13

Bercy Arena, Paris
Attendance: 12.721
Referees: Cristian Colombatti

=== Group B ===
Pos	Team	Pld	W	L	PF	PA	PD	Pts	Qualification
1	United States	3	3	0	202	159	+43	6	Quarter-finals
2	Spain	3	2	1	192	179	+13	5	Quarter-finals
3	Netherlands	3	1	2	153	183	−30	4	Quarter-finals
4	Australia	3	0	3	184	210	−26	3	Quarter-finals

Source: Paris 2024
Rules for classification: 1) Points; 2) Head-to-head results; 3) Points difference; 4) Points scored.

29 August 2024
16:00

Report

United States	66–56	Spain
Scoring by quarter: 18–17, 14–12, 14–11, 20–16
Pts: Williams 22; Rebs: Serio 11; Asts: Serio 12		Pts: Ortega 17; Rebs: Sánchez, Lorenzo 8 Asts: Ortega 6

Bercy Arena, Paris
Attendance: 12.682
Referees: Shu-Fei Hsieh

29 August 2024
21:30

Report

Australia	55–66	Netherlands
Scoring by quarter: 16–12, 14–16, 10–16, 15–22
Pts: Latham 16; Rebs: Latham 13; Asts: Norris, Knowles 5		Pts: Op den Orth 26; Rebs: Op den Orth 12; Asts: Zantinge 9

Bercy Arena, Paris
Attendance: 11.029
Referees: Sébastien Gauthier

30 August 2024
12:45

Report

Spain	68–60	Australia
Scoring by quarter: 19–12, 14–13, 19–5, 16–30
Pts: A. Zarzuela 25; Rebs: A. Zarzuela 9 Asts: Ortega 9		Pts: Brown 22; Rebs: Knowles, Brown 6 Asts: Knowles 8

Bercy Arena, Paris
Attendance: 10.147
Referees: Erik Etzelmüller

31 August 2024
16:00

Report

Netherlands	34–60	United States
Scoring by quarter: 4–17, 15–12, 13–14, 2–17
Pts: Op den Orth 26; Rebs: Op den Orth 9 Asts: Poggenwisch 10		Pts: Bell 18; Rebs: Bell 11; Asts: Serio 8

Bercy Arena, Paris
Attendance: 12.741
Referees: Cristian Colombatti

1 September 2024
10:30

Report

Australia	69–76	United States
Scoring by quarter: 21–22, 18–23, 18–23, 12–8
Pts: O'Neill-Thorne 14; Rebs: Latham 9 Asts: Leard, Knowles 5		Pts: Williams 24; Rebs: Bell, Fitzpatrick 5 Asts: Serio 9

Bercy Arena, Paris
Attendance: 12.679
Referees: Tomáš Pajer

1 September 2024
18:15

Report

Netherlands	53–68	Spain
Scoring by quarter: 18–14, 13–21, 15–14, 7–19
Pts: Bellers 22; Rebs: Bellers 11; Asts: Poggenwisch 7		Pts: Ortega 19; Rebs: A. Zarzuela 10; Asts: Ortega 7

Bercy Arena, Paris
Attendance: 12.725
Referees: Sébastien Gauthier

== Knockout stage ==
Quarter-finals
3 September - 19:15
Great Britain	84
Australia	64
3 September - 13:45
Spain	49
Germany	57
3 September - 16:00
Canada	79
Netherlands	67
3 September - 21:30
United States	82
France	47

Semi-finals
5 September - 16:00
Great Britain	71
Germany	43
5 September - 21:30
Canada	43
United States	80

Gold medal match
7 September - 21:30
Great Britain	69
United States	73
Bronze medal match
7 September - 16:00
Germany	75
Canada	62

=== Quarter-finals ===
3 September 2024
13:45

Report

Spain	49–57	Germany
Scoring by quarter: 13–12, 6–14, 20–17, 10–14
Pts: Ortega 21; Rebs: A. Zarzuela 9 Asts: Ortega 5		Pts: Böhme 26; Rebs: Böhme 15; Asts: Böhme 7

Bercy Arena, Paris
Attendance: 11.279
Referees: Sébastien Gauthier

3 September 2024
16:00

Report

Canada	79–67	Netherlands
Scoring by quarter: 18–19, 26–10, 21–22, 14–16
Pts: Anderson 20; Rebs: Anderson 20; Asts: Gončin 7		Pts: Op den Orth 18; Rebs: Poggenwisch 9 Asts: Poggenwisch 12

Bercy Arena, Paris
Attendance: 11.279
Referees: Shu-Fei Hsieh

3 September 2024
19:15

Report

Great Britain	84–64	Australia
Scoring by quarter: 17-16, 21-19, 18-16, 28-13
Pts: Fox 26; Rebs: Manning 16; Asts: Pratt 18		Pts: Latham 20; Rebs: Latham 7 Asts: Knowles 5

Bercy Arena, Paris
Attendance: 12,652
Referees: Gustavo Mathias

3 September 2024
21:30

Report

United States	82–47	France
Scoring by quarter: 24-12, 17-15, 27-10, 14-10
Pts: Williams 23; Rebs: Bell 14; Asts: Williams 10		Pts: Carlier 11; Rebs: Carlier 10; Asts: Ramonet 5

Bercy Arena, Paris
Attendance: 12,652
Referees: Blaine Krapljanov

=== Classification matches ===
Classification qualifying

4 September 2024
10:30

Report

Spain	74–78	Australia
Scoring by quarter: 24–16, 18–22, 16–21, 16–19
Pts: A. Zarzuela 16; Rebs: A. Zarzuela 8 Asts: P. Zarzuela, Ortega 10		Pts: Latham 33; Rebs: Latham 6 Asts: Norris, O'Neill-Thorne 8

Bercy Arena, Paris
Attendance: 11.430
Referees: Adam Fronczak

5 September 2024
18:15

Report

Netherlands	72–63	France
Scoring by quarter: 20–6, 19–22, 19–19, 14–16
Pts: Op den Orth 23; Rebs: Poggenwisch 11; Asts: Poggenwisch 19		Pts: Jouenserre 21; Rebs: Carlier 10; Asts: Mehiaoui 13

Bercy Arena, Paris
Attendance: 11.470
Referees: Gustavo Mathias

7th–8th classification match

6 September 2024
13:45

Report

Spain	72–57	France
Scoring by quarter: 16–12, 17–16, 22–13, 17–16
Pts: Ortega 16; Rebs: A. Zarzuela 8 Asts: García 8		Pts: Ramonet 15; Rebs: Bayle 7 Asts: Mehiaoui 7

Bercy Arena, Paris
Attendance: 12.527
Referees: Blaine Krapljanov

5th–6th classification match

6 September 2024
19:15

Report

Netherlands	75–82	Australia
Scoring by quarter: 20–22, 18–25, 18–19, 19–16
Pts: Op den Orth 22; Rebs: Op den Orth 13; Asts: Poggenwisch 12		Pts: Knowles 21; Rebs: Latham 8 Asts: Norris 8

Bercy Arena, Paris
Attendance: 12.514
Referees: Yekta Koç

=== Semi-finals ===
5 September 2024
16:00

Report

Great Britain	71–43	Germany
Scoring by quarter: 10-11, 18-13, 20-8, 23-11
Pts: Warburton 35; Rebs: Manning 14; Asts: Pratt 14		Pts: Böhme 11; Rebs: Halouski 6 Asts: Böhme 6

Bercy Arena, Paris
Attendance: 11,470

5 September 2024
21:30

Report

United States	80–43	Canada
Scoring by quarter: 15–16, 25–16, 19–7, 21–4
Pts: Bell 31; Rebs: Bell 10; Asts: Williams 11		Pts: Anderson 16; Rebs: Anderson 6 Asts: Higgins 7

Bercy Arena, Paris
Attendance: 12.524
Referees: Linas Radykas

=== Bronze medal match ===
7 September 2024
16:00

Report

Canada	62–75	Germany
Scoring by quarter: 17–11, 18–16, 13–20, 14–28
Pts: Anderson 31; Rebs: Anderson 11; Asts: Anderson, Gončin 4		Pts: Böhme 36; Rebs: Güntner 10; Asts: three players 5

Bercy Arena, Paris
Attendance: 12.419
Referees: Krunoslav Peić

=== Gold medal match ===
7 September 2024
21:30

Report

Great Britain	69–73	United States
Scoring by quarter: 18–23, 13–15, 12–15, 26–20
Pts: Manning 21; Rebs: Manning 16; Asts: Pratt 16		Pts: Williams 26; Rebs: Serio 10; Asts: Serio, Williams 8

Bercy Arena, Paris
Attendance: 12,611
Referees: Sébastien Gauthier

== Rankings ==
Rank	Team
1st place, gold medalist(s)	United States
2nd place, silver medalist(s)	Great Britain
3rd place, bronze medalist(s)	Germany
4	Canada
5	Australia
6	Netherlands
7	Spain
8	France
