= Jorge Salazar (basketball) =

American wheelchair basketball player

Personal information
- Full name: Jorge Eligio Salazar
- Born: December 7, 1989 (age 36) Delano, California, U.S.

Sport
- Sport: Wheelchair basketball
- Disability class: 3.5
Medal record
Representing the United States
Men's wheelchair basketball
Paralympic Games
Gold medal – first place	2024 Paris	Team
World Championship
Gold medal – first place	2022 Dubai	Team
Parapan American Games
Gold medal – first place	2023 Santiago	Team

Jorge Eligio Salazar (born December 7, 1989) is an American wheelchair basketball player and a member of the United States men's national wheelchair basketball team. He represented the United States at the 2024 Summer Paralympics.

== Career ==
Salazar represented the United States 2022 Wheelchair Basketball World Championships and won a gold medal.

In November 2023, he represented the United States at the 2023 Parapan American Games and won a gold medal in wheelchair basketball. As a result, Team USA automatically qualified to compete at the 2024 Summer Paralympics. On March 30, 2024, he was selected to represent the United States at the 2024 Summer Paralympics. He won a gold medal in wheelchair basketball. With 1 minute, 50 seconds remaining in the game, team captain Steve Serio fouled out. Salazar replaced Serio, making his first appearance of the gold medal game. With 27 seconds left in the game, Salazar recorded an offensive rebound that led to Brian Bell scoring eight seconds later, making it a two-possession game.

== Personal life ==
Salazar was a member of the United States Marine Corps from 2008 to 2014. While deployed to Afghanistan in 2012, his legs were severed below the knee by an improvised explosive device (IED). Salazar took charge of his squad after his squad leader was wounded by an IED, even after being injured by IED blast himself. He was subsequently awarded the Bronze Star Medal and a Purple Heart for his service in the military.
