= Wheelchair basketball at the 2020 Summer Paralympics – Men's tournament =

Wheelchair basketball at the XVI Paralympic Games
- Venue: Ariake Arena; Musashino Forest Sport Plaza
- Dates: 25 August – 5 September 2021
- Competitors: 144 from 12 nations

Medalists
1st place, gold medalist(s)		United States
2nd place, silver medalist(s)		Japan
3rd place, bronze medalist(s)		Great Britain

The 2020 Summer Paralympics men's tournament in Tokyo began on 25 August and was ended on the 5 September 2021. The matches were played at the Musashino Forest Sport Plaza and the Ariake Arena. This was the fourteenth edition of the tournament since the tournament debut at the 1968 Summer Paralympics in Tel Aviv.

Twelve teams were separated into two groups of six with the top four qualifying through to the knockout stage of the competition. From there it would be a knockout format which would lead to the gold medal match.

== Competition schedule ==
G	Group stage	¼	Quarter-finals	½	Semi-finals	B	Bronze medal match	GM	Gold medal match

Date Event	Wed 25 Aug	Thu 26 Aug	Fri 27 Aug	Sat 28 Aug	Sun 29 Aug	Mon 30 Aug	Tue 31 Aug	Wed 1 Sep	Thu 2 Sep	Fri 3 Sep	Sat 4 Sep	Sun 5 Sep	
Men	G	G	G	G	G	G		1/4		1/2		B	GM

== Qualification ==
Twelve teams qualified through the qualifying stage with the host nation in Japan. The other eleven spots were spread out across four different events. Four spots was taken up by European teams, three by the Americas and Asia/Pacific and one in Africa.

Means of qualification	Date	Venue	Berths	Qualified
Host country	—N/a	—N/a	1	Japan
2019 Parapan American Games	23 August – 1 September 2019	(Peru) Lima	3	United States; Canada; Colombia
2019 IWBF Men's European Championship	28 August – 9 September 2019	(Poland) Wałbrzych	4	Germany; Great Britain; Spain; Turkey
2019 Asia/Oceania Zonal Championships	29 November – 7 December 2019	(Thailand) Pattaya	3	Australia; Iran; South Korea
2020 African Zonal Championships	1–7 March 2020	(South Africa) Johannesburg	1	Algeria
Total			12	

== Preliminary round ==
=== Group A ===
Pos	Team	Pld	W	L	PF	PA	PD	Pts	Qualification
1	Spain	5	5	0	375	272	+103	10	Quarter-finals
2	Japan (H)	5	4	1	312	298	+14	9	Quarter-finals
3	Turkey	5	3	2	353	327	+26	8	Quarter-finals
4	Canada	5	2	3	307	333	−26	7	Quarter-finals
5	South Korea	5	1	4	305	332	−27	6	9th/10th place playoff
6	Colombia	5	0	5	256	346	−90	5	11th/12th place playoff

Source: TOCOG
Rules for classification: 1) Points; 2) Head-to-head results; 3) Points difference; 4) Points scored.
(H) Hosts

25 August 2021
20:30

Report

Spain	65–53	South Korea
Scoring by quarter: 16–10, 15–14, 12–16, 22–13
Pts: García 18; Rebs: García 13; Asts: García 12		Pts: Gim 24; Rebs: Gim 14; Asts: Cho 8

Musashino Forest Sport Plaza
Referees: Matias Quintana

26 August 2021
11:15

Report

Canada	41–78	Spain
Scoring by quarter: 10–23, 14–18, 10–15, 7–22
Pts: Goncin 15; Rebs: Goncin 8 Asts: Anderson, Higgins 3		Pts: García 23; Rebs: García, Zarzuela 8 Asts: García 9

Ariake Arena
Referees: Darrell Hargreaves

26 August 2021
17:00

Report

South Korea	70–80	Turkey
Scoring by quarter: 15–21, 18–17, 15–19, 22–23
Pts: Cho 26; Rebs: Gim 11; Asts: Cho 8		Pts: Gürbulak 25; Rebs: Toprak 8 Asts: Gürbulak 13

Musashino Forest Sport Plaza
Attendance: 40
Referees: Tomas Pajer

26 August 2021
20:30

Report

Colombia	56–63	Japan
Scoring by quarter: 15–24, 13–12, 15–15, 13–12
Pts: Hernandez 21; Rebs: Diaz, Hernandez 8 Asts: Leep 6		Pts: Akita 24; Rebs: Chokai 17; Asts: Chokai 10

Musashino Forest Sport Plaza
Attendance: 40
Referees: Yap Poh Boon

27 August 2021
11:15

Report

Turkey	77–73 (OT)	Canada
Scoring by quarter: 20–13, 10–17, 15–24, 22–13, Overtime: 10–6
Pts: Gürbulak 28; Rebs: Gürbulak 8 Asts: Gürbulak 13		Pts: Goncin 33; Rebs: Anderson 22; Asts: Goncin 11

Musashino Forest Sport Plaza
Attendance: 180
Referees: Matias Quintana

27 August 2021
14:45

Report

Spain	74–56	Colombia
Scoring by quarter: 18–16, 15–16, 21–18, 20–6
Pts: Ortega 19; Rebs: Zarzuela 11; Asts: García 11		Pts: Diaz 18; Rebs: Hernandez 12; Asts: Leep 7

Ariake Arena
Referees: Tomas Pajer

27 August 2021
20:30

Report

Japan	59–52	South Korea
Scoring by quarter: 14–9, 17–12, 16–15, 12–16
Pts: Fujimoto 21; Rebs: Akita 11; Asts: Chokai 10		Pts: Cho 21; Rebs: Gim 14; Asts: Cho 6

Ariake Arena
Referees: Krunoslav Peic

28 August 2021
9:00

Report

Turkey	61–79	Spain
Scoring by quarter: 10–17, 16–21, 22–21, 13–20
Pts: Gürbulak 26; Rebs: Gümüş 5 Asts: Toprak 9		Pts: Ruiz 20; Rebs: Lorenzo 13; Asts: García 8

Ariake Arena
Referees: Darrell Hargreaves

28 August 2021
14:45

Report

Japan	62–56	Canada
Scoring by quarter: 6–12, 13–18, 19–14, 24–12
Pts: Kozai 24; Rebs: Chokai 8 Asts: Chokai 6		Pts: Anderson 22; Rebs: Goncin 13; Asts: Goncin 6

Ariake Arena
Referees: Hsieh Shu-fei

28 August 2021
20:30

Report

South Korea	66–54	Colombia
Scoring by quarter: 19–10, 16–17, 18–10, 13–17
Pts: Lee C. 14; Rebs: Lee Y. 13; Asts: Oh 11		Pts: Hernandez 21; Rebs: Sanz 8 Asts: Hernandez 9

Musashino Forest Sport Plaza
Attendance: 0
Referees: Hiroki Ono

29 August 2021
11:15

Report

Colombia	38–80	Turkey
Scoring by quarter: 8–15, 13–22, 7–27, 10–16
Pts: Diaz 9 Rebs: Granados 5 Asts: Leep 4		Pts: Gürbulak 19; Rebs: Gümüş, Gürbulak 7 Asts: Gürbulak 11

Musashino Forest Sport Plaza
Referees: Helen Rosenberg

29 August 2021
17:00

Report

Canada	74–64	South Korea
Scoring by quarter: 21–17, 15–15, 17–15, 21–17
Pts: Anderson 29; Rebs: Anderson 9 Asts: Goncin 10		Pts: Cho 22; Rebs: Kim S. 9 Asts: Gim 7

Ariake Arena
Referees: Ben Wood

29 August 2021
20:30

Report

Spain	79–61	Japan
Scoring by quarter: 22–18, 26–12, 12–17, 19–14
Pts: García 27; Rebs: García 12; Asts: García 17		Pts: Furusawa 15; Rebs: Chokai, Fujimoto 5 Asts: Akaishi 5

Ariake Arena
Referees: Mauricio Gamez

30 August 2021
9:00

Report

Colombia	52–63	Canada
Scoring by quarter: 7–15, 12–20, 18–16, 15–12
Pts: Diaz 18; Rebs: Diaz 11; Asts: Hernandez, Leep, Vargas 5		Pts: Anderson 22; Rebs: Anderson 17; Asts: Anderson, Goncin 8

Ariake Arena
Referees: Hiroki Ono

30 August 2021
14:45

Report

Turkey	55–67	Japan
Scoring by quarter: 12–9, 15–19, 17–17, 11–22
Pts: Toprak 17; Rebs: Gürbulak 9 Asts: Gürbulak 6		Pts: Kozai 22; Rebs: Chokai 14; Asts: Chokai 8

Ariake Arena
Referees: Gustavo Mathias

=== Group B ===
Pos	Team	Pld	W	L	PF	PA	PD	Pts	Qualification
1	Great Britain	5	4	1	332	303	+29	9	Quarter-finals
2	United States	5	4	1	338	223	+115	9	Quarter-finals
3	Australia	5	3	2	335	265	+70	8	Quarter-finals
4	Germany	5	3	2	306	284	+22	8	Quarter-finals
5	Iran	5	1	4	271	318	−47	6	9th/10th place playoff
6	Algeria	5	0	5	202	391	−189	5	11th/12th place playoff

Source: TOCOG
Rules for classification: 1) Points; 2) Head-to-head results; 3) Points difference; 4) Points scored.

26 August 2021
9:00

Report

United States	58–55	Germany
Scoring by quarter: 10–16, 12–12, 18–14, 18–13
Pts: Bell 20; Rebs: Bell 8 Asts: Scott 10		Pts: Böhme 19; Rebs: Böhme 9 Asts: Böhme 7

Ariake Arena
Referees: Linas Radykas

26 August 2021
14:45

Report

Australia	81–39	Iran
Scoring by quarter: 28–8, 20–11, 17–5, 16–15
Pts: Stibners 21; Rebs: Auprince 8 Asts: Norris 6		Pts: Sayari 22; Rebs: Sayari 9 Asts: Bagzadehfard, Sayari 3

Musashino Forest Sport Plaza
Referees: Gustavo Mathias

26 August 2021
14:45

Report

Great Britain	70–43	Algeria
Scoring by quarter: 19–12, 14–9, 21–10, 16–12
Pts: Bywater, Choudhry 11; Rebs: Sagar 8 Asts: Bywater 9		Pts: Mansouri 12; Rebs: Zidi 13; Asts: Guedoun, Zidi 4

Ariake Arena
Referees: Juan Urunuela

27 August 2021
9:00

Report

Algeria	37–83	Australia
Scoring by quarter: 9–21, 8–21, 14–20, 6–21
Pts: Zidi 14; Rebs: Zidi 10; Asts: Guedoun 5		Pts: Latham 16; Rebs: Latham 10; Asts: McPhail 13

Musashino Forest Sport Plaza
Attendance: 180
Referees: Erik Etzelmueller

27 August 2021
14:45

Report

Germany	71–59	Great Britain
Scoring by quarter: 13–13, 18–15, 26–15, 14–16
Pts: Böhme 27; Rebs: Böhme 10; Asts: Böhme, Halouski 5		Pts: Choudhry 14; Rebs: Manning 10; Asts: Warburton 13

Musashino Forest Sport Plaza
Attendance: 8
Referees: Alexandre Lapointe

27 August 2021
17:00

Report

Iran	41–65	United States
Scoring by quarter: 9–22, 9–17, 11–14, 12–12
Pts: Sayari 17; Rebs: Sayari 14; Asts: Saadatpoormoghadam 6		Pts: Serio 12; Rebs: Serio 8 Asts: Serio 10

Ariake Arena
Referees: Hector Carmona

28 August 2021
11:15

Report

Australia	64–53	Germany
Scoring by quarter: 21–11, 7–11, 20–19, 16–12
Pts: Latham 17; Rebs: Latham 11; Asts: Norris 10		Pts: Halouski 13; Rebs: Bienek 9 Asts: Halouski 8

Ariake Arena
Referees: Adam Fronczak

28 August 2021
14:45

Report

Algeria	47–81	Iran
Scoring by quarter: 10–18, 8–19, 15–22, 14–22
Pts: Ayache 13; Rebs: Zidi 6 Asts: Guedoun 4, Ayache 4		Pts: Sayari 30; Rebs: Bagzadehfard 9 Asts: Bagzadehfard, Sayari 7

Musashino Forest Sport Plaza
Attendance: 1,032
Referees: Krunoslav Peic

28 August 2021
17:00

Report

Great Britain	64–63	United States
Scoring by quarter: 20–15, 15–14, 16–15, 13–19
Pts: Choudhry, Manning 12; Rebs: Manning 14; Asts: Choudhry 10		Pts: Williams 19; Rebs: Serio 7 Asts: Serio 8

Musashino Forest Sport Plaza
Attendance: 1,032
Referees: Yekta Şansal Koç

29 August 2021
9:00

Report

Iran	57–69	Great Britain
Scoring by quarter: 15–20, 16–20, 10–10, 16–19
Pts: Sayari 27; Rebs: Saadatpoormoghadam 7 Asts: Saadatpoormoghadam 6		Pts: Bywater 18; Rebs: Bywater 8 Asts: Bywater 16

Musashino Forest Sport Plaza
Attendance: 91
Referees: Celine Villard

29 August 2021
14:45

Report

United States	66–38	Australia
Scoring by quarter: 17–15, 21–11, 16–4, 12–8
Pts: Williams 24; Rebs: Serio 9 Asts: Williams 7		Pts: Latham 13; Rebs: Latham 9 Asts: O'Neill-Thorne 7

Musashino Forest Sport Plaza
Attendance: 810
Referees: Linas Radykas

29 August 2021
14:45

Report

Germany	71–50	Algeria
Scoring by quarter: 18–13, 19–12, 16–19, 18–6
Pts: Böhme 21; Rebs: Böhme 11; Asts: Böhme 8		Pts: Badrane, Megueddem 11; Rebs: Zidi 9 Asts: Zidi 4

Ariake Arena
Referees: Hector Carmona

30 August 2021
11:30

Report

Germany	56–53	Iran
Scoring by quarter: 16–13, 13–12, 18–8, 9–20
Pts: Halouski 27; Rebs: Halouski 15; Asts: Böhme 7		Pts: Sayari 16; Rebs: Sayari 15; Asts: Sayari 8

Ariake Arena
Referees: Juan Urunuela

30 August 2021
17:15

Report

Australia	69–70	Great Britain
Scoring by quarter: 27–12, 11–13, 17–25, 14–20
Pts: O'Neill-Thorne 23; Rebs: Latham 10; Asts: Norris, O'Neill-Thorne 8		Pts: Choudhry 28; Rebs: Manning 14; Asts: Choudhry 11

Ariake Arena
Referees: Sebastien Gauthier

30 August 2021
20:30

Report

Algeria	25–86	United States
Scoring by quarter: 9–24, 4–23, 10–18, 2–21
Pts: Ayache 13; Rebs: Megueddem 6 Asts: Ayache 3		Pts: Turek 21; Rebs: Scott 9 Asts: Scott 6

Ariake Arena
Referees: Geghard Tahmasian

== Knockout stage ==
=== Bracket ===
Quarter-finals
1 September
Spain	71
Germany	68
1 September
United States	52
Turkey	45
1 September
Japan	61
Australia	55
1 September
Great Britain	66
Canada	52

Semi-finals
3 September
Spain	52
United States	66
3 September
Japan	79
Great Britain	68

Gold medal match
5 September
United States (gold)	64
Japan (silver)	60
Bronze medal match
5 September
Spain	58
Great Britain (bronze)	68

=== 11th–12th classification match ===
1 September 2021
9:00

Report

Colombia	70–47	Algeria
Scoring by quarter: 22–11, 11–15, 15–7, 22–14
Pts: Hernandez 28; Rebs: Diaz 13; Asts: Hernandez 9		Pts: Ayache 20; Rebs: Ayache 9 Asts: Zidi 5

Ariake Arena
Referees: Hsieh Shu-fei

=== 9th–10th classification match ===
2 September 2021
12:30

Report

South Korea	54–64	Iran
Scoring by quarter: 16–10, 14–16, 12–21, 12–17
Pts: Cho 17; Rebs: Gim 9 Asts: Cho 7		Pts: Sayari 26; Rebs: Sayari 11; Asts: Kamali, Tolouei Tamardash 8

Ariake Arena
Referees: Ben Wood

=== Quarter-finals ===
1 September 2021
12:30

Report

United States	52–45	Turkey
Scoring by quarter: 11–18, 14–8, 10–6, 17–13
Pts: Bell 18; Rebs: Serio 9 Asts: Serio 10		Pts: Gürbulak 21; Rebs: Gürbulak 12; Asts: Toprak 7

Ariake Arena
Referees: Gustavo Mathias

1 September 2021
15:00

Report

Spain	71–68	Germany
Scoring by quarter: 21–19, 19–15, 14–14, 17–20
Pts: Ruiz 24; Rebs: García 16; Asts: García 13		Pts: Böhme 16; Rebs: Böhme 8 Asts: Halouski 8

Ariake Arena
Referees: Matias Quintana

1 September 2021
18:15

Report

Great Britain	66–52	Canada
Scoring by quarter: 14–16, 12–14, 16–13, 24–9
Pts: Choudhry 21; Rebs: Manning 19; Asts: Choudhry 14		Pts: Anderson 22; Rebs: Anderson 17; Asts: Anderson, Goncin 7

Ariake Arena
Attendance: 190
Referees: Juan Urunuela

1 September 2021
20:45

Report

Japan	61–55	Australia
Scoring by quarter: 14–14, 21–16, 12–9, 14–16
Pts: Kozai 20; Rebs: Chokai 12; Asts: Chokai 9		Pts: O'Neill-Thorne 18; Rebs: Auprince, O'Neill-Thorne 5 Asts: O'Neill-Thorne 7

Ariake Arena
Attendance: 190
Referees: Darrell Hargreaves

=== 7th–8th classification match ===
3 September 2021
12:30

Report

Germany	68–56	Canada
Scoring by quarter: 19–21, 18–10, 13–10, 18–15
Pts: Halouski 20; Rebs: Bienek 11; Asts: Böhme, Halouski 6		Pts: Hedges 16; Rebs: Goncin 14; Asts: Goncin 11

Ariake Arena
Referees: Hsieh Shu-fei

=== 5th–6th classification match ===
4 September 2021
14:45

Report

Turkey	58–74	Australia
Scoring by quarter: 18–23, 6–16, 16–20, 18–15
Pts: Toprak 12; Rebs: Gümüş 10; Asts: four players 3		Pts: Knowles 31; Rebs: Knowles, O'Neill-Thorne 6 Asts: Knowles 7

Ariake Arena
Attendance: 38
Referees: Hsieh Shu-fei

=== Semi-finals ===
3 September 2021
18:15

Report

Spain	52–66	United States
Scoring by quarter: 14–15, 8–24, 11–18, 19–9
Pts: Zarzuela 17; Rebs: García 12; Asts: García 15		Pts: Bell 20; Rebs: Bell 11; Asts: Serio 8

Ariake Arena
Attendance: 347
Referees: Alexandre Lapointe

3 September 2021
20:45

Report

Japan	79–68	Great Britain
Scoring by quarter: 15–23, 18–13, 19–12, 27–20
Pts: Chokai 20; Rebs: Chokai 8 Asts: Chokai 8		Pts: Choudhry 26; Rebs: Manning 7 Asts: Choudhry 11

Ariake Arena
Attendance: 347
Referees: Darrell Hargreaves

=== Bronze medal match ===
5 September 2021
10:00

Report

Spain	58–68	Great Britain (bronze)
Scoring by quarter: 13–13, 17–15, 10–22, 18–18
Pts: Zarzuela 17; Rebs: Zarzuela 9 Asts: García 10		Pts: Choudhry 19; Rebs: Manning 21; Asts: Warburton 8

Ariake Arena
Attendance: 62
Referees: Matias Quintana

=== Gold medal match ===
5 September 2021
12:30

Report

(gold) United States	64–60	Japan (silver)
Scoring by quarter: 18–18, 14–9, 13–19, 19–14
Pts: Serio 28; Rebs: Bell, Williams 7 Asts: Serio 9		Pts: Kozai 18; Rebs: Chokai 18; Asts: Kozai 5

Ariake Arena
Attendance: 62
Referees: Juan Urunuela

== Rankings ==
Rank	Team
1st place, gold medalist(s)	United States
2nd place, silver medalist(s)	Japan
3rd place, bronze medalist(s)	Great Britain
4	Spain
5	Australia
6	Turkey
7	Germany
8	Canada
9	Iran
10	South Korea
11	Colombia
12	Algeria
