= 2014 World Wheelchair Basketball Championship =

2014 World Wheelchair Basketball Championship may refer to:

- 2014 Men's World Wheelchair Basketball Championship
- 2014 Women's World Wheelchair Basketball Championship
