= 2014 Men's World Wheelchair Basketball Championship =

2014 Men's World Wheelchair Basketball World Championship
- Hope, Passion and Challenge
- Venue: Incheon Samsan World Sports Complex, Incheon Songnim Gymnasium
- Location: Incheon
- Start date: 5 July
- End date: 14 July 2014
- Nations: 16 teams

The 2014 Men's Wheelchair Basketball World Championship was the 12th edition of the Wheelchair Basketball World Championship. It was hosted in Incheon, South Korea. Australia won its second title in a row.

== Medalists ==
Event	Gold	Silver	Bronze
Men's team	Australia Justin Eveson; Bill Latham; Adam Deans; Shaun Norris; Michael Hartnett; Tristan Knowles; Jannik Blair; Tom O'Neill-Thorne; Joshua Allison; Luke Pople; Nick Taylor; Brad Ness; Coach: Ben Ettridge	United States Joshua Turek; Michael Paye; Carter Arey; Trevon Jenifer; Brian Bell; Matthew Scott; Roger Gouge; Steven Serio; John Gilbert; Ian Lynch; Paul Schulte; Nathan Hinze; Coach:	Turkey Murat Yazici; Özgür Gürbulak; Fikri Gündoğdu; İbrahim Yavuz; İsmail Ar; Deniz Acar; Cem Gezinci; Kaan Dalay; Murat Arslanoğlu; Ferit Gümüş; Bestami Boz; Coach:

== Preliminary round ==
=== Group A ===
Team	Pld	W	L	Pts.
Great Britain	3	3	0	6
South Korea	3	2	1	5
Argentina	3	1	2	4
Mexico	5	0	3	3

5 July
09:00

report

Great Britain	60–51	Argentina

Samsan World Sports Complex

5 July
15:30

report

Mexico	61–72	South Korea

Samsan World Sports Complex

6 July
10:00

report

Argentina	60–45	Mexico

Songnim Gymnasium

6 July
12:15

report

South Korea	47–77	Great Britain

Songnim Gymnasium

7 July
14:30

report

South Korea	55–46	Argentina

Samsan World Sports Complex

7 July
16:45

report

Great Britain	74–54	Mexico

Samsan World Sports Complex

=== Group B ===
Team	Pld	W	L	Pts.
Spain	3	3	0	6
Japan	3	1	2	4
Iran	3	1	2	4
Netherlands	5	1	2	4

5 July
11:15

report

Netherlands	51–62	Japan

Samsan World Sports Complex

5 July
17:45

report

Spain	66–45	Iran

Samsan World Sports Complex

6 July
14:30

report

Iran	42–48	Netherlands

Songnim Gymnasium

6 July
16:45

report

Japan	52–61	Spain

Songnim Gymnasium

7 July
10:00

report

Iran	73–69	Japan

Samsan World Sports Complex

7 July
10:00

report

Netherlands	47–56	Spain

Songnim Gymnasium

=== Group C ===
Team	Pld	W	L	Pts.
United States	3	3	0	6
Turkey	3	2	1	5
Colombia	3	1	2	4
Algeria	5	0	3	3

5 July
08:00

report

Algeria	38–70	Colombia

Songnim Gymnasium

5 July
10:15

report

Turkey	57–74	United States

Songnim Gymnasium

6 July
12:15

report

United States	68–37	Algeria

Samsan World Sports Complex

6 July
16:45

report

Colombia	56–63	Turkey

Samsan World Sports Complex

7 July
12:15

report

Turkey	69–39	Algeria

Samsan World Sports Complex

7 July
14:30

report

Colombia	43–50	United States

Songnim Gymnasium

=== Group D ===
Team	Pld	W	L	Pts.
Australia	3	3	0	6
Germany	3	1	2	4
Italy	3	1	2	4
Sweden	5	1	2	4

5 July
16:30

report

Germany	44–55	Italy

Songnim Gymnasium

5 July
18:45

report

Sweden	62–71	Australia

Songnim Gymnasium

6 July
10:00

report

Italy	62–71	Sweden

Samsan World Sports Complex

6 July
14:30

report

Australia	62–38	Germany

Samsan World Sports Complex

7 July
12:15

report

Germany	67–49	Sweden

Songnim Gymnasium

7 July
16:45

report

Australia	65–45	Italy

Songnim Gymnasium

== Second round ==
=== Group E ===
Team	Pld	W	L	Pts.
Great Britain	3	3	0	6
Spain	3	2	1	5
South Korea	3	2	1	5
Iran	3	1	2	4
Japan	3	1	2	4
Argentina	3	0	3	3

8 July
12:15

report

Great Britain	64–59	Iran

Samsan World Sports Complex

8 July
14:30

report

South Korea	60–58	Japan

Samsan World Sports Complex

8 July
16:45

report

Argentina	30–63	Spain

Samsan World Sports Complex

9 July
12:15

report

Spain	57–49	South Korea

Songnim Gymnasium

9 July
14:30

report

Japan	47–65	Great Britain

Songnim Gymnasium

9 July
16:45

report

Iran	53–51	Argentina

Songnim Gymnasium

10 July
12:15

report

Great Britain	60–44	Spain

Samsan World Sports Complex

10 July
14:30

report

South Korea	67–64	Iran

Samsan World Sports Complex

10 July
16:45

report

Argentina	49–57	Japan

Samsan World Sports Complex

=== Group F ===
Team	Pld	W	L	Pts.
United States	3	2	1	5
Australia	3	2	1	5
Italy	3	2	1	5
Turkey	3	1	2	4
Colombia	3	1	2	4
Germany	3	1	2	4

8 July
12:15

report

United States	41–54	Italy

Songnim Gymnasium

8 July
14:30

report

Turkey	52–76	Germany

Songnim Gymnasium

8 July
16:45

report

Colombia	46–62	Australia

Songnim Gymnasium

9 July
12:15

report

Australia	63–58	Turkey

Samsan World Sports Complex

9 July
14:30

report

Germany	48–88	United States

Samsan World Sports Complex

9 July
16:45

report

Italy	70–37	Colombia

Samsan World Sports Complex

10 July
12:15

report

United States	67–57	Australia

Songnim Gymnasium

10 July
14:30

report

Colombia	62–55	Germany

Songnim Gymnasium

10 July
16:45

report

Turkey	46–44	Italy

Songnim Gymnasium

=== Group G ===
Team	Pld	W	L	Pts.
Mexico	3	3	0	6
Sweden	3	2	1	5
Netherlands	3	1	2	4
Algeria	3	0	3	3

8 July
10:00

report

Mexico	65–45	Netherlands

Samsan World Sports Complex

8 July
10:00

report

Algeria	58–75	Sweden

Songnim Gymnasium

9 July
10:00

report

Netherlands	46–62	Sweden

Samsan World Sports Complex

9 July
10:00

report

Mexico	55–44	Algeria

Songnim Gymnasium

10 July
10:00

report

Sweden	53–51	Mexico

Samsan World Sports Complex

10 July
10:00

report

Algeria	41–74	Netherlands

Songnim Gymnasium

== Playoffs ==
Place 15/16

11 July
11:15

report

Algeria	46–44	Netherlands

Samsan World Sports Complex

Place 13/14

11 July
13:30

report

Mexico	58–75	Sweden

Samsan World Sports Complex

Place 11/12

11 July
15:45

report

Argentina	61–62	Germany

Samsan World Sports Complex

Place 9/10

11 July
18:00

report

Japan	65–56	Colombia

Samsan World Sports Complex

Place 7/8

13 July
11:15

report

Great Britain	77–65	Iran

Samsan World Sports Complex

Place 5/6

13 July
13:30

report

Italy	63–57	South Korea

Samsan World Sports Complex

== Finals ==
Quarter-finals
12 July 2014
Great Britain	70
Turkey	71
12 July 2014
Australia	61
South Korea	50
12 July 2014
United States	72
Iran	51
12 July 2014
Spain	66
Italy	48

Semi-finals
13 July 2014
Turkey	58
Australia	63
13 July 2014
United States	56
Spain	49

Final
14 July 2014
Australia	63
United States	57
Third place
14 July 2014
Turkey	68
Spain	63

=== Quarterfinals ===
12 July
11:15

report

Great Britain	69–71	Turkey

Samsan World Sports Complex

12 July
13:30

report

United States	72–51	Iran

Samsan World Sports Complex

12 July
15:45

report

Spain	66–48	Italy

Samsan World Sports Complex

12 July
18:00

report

Australia	61–50	South Korea

Samsan World Sports Complex

=== Semifinals ===
13 July
15:45

report

Turkey	58–63	Australia

Samsan World Sports Complex

13 July
18:00

report

United States	56–49	Spain

Samsan World Sports Complex

=== Bronze medal match ===
14 July
11:15

report

Turkey	68–63	Spain

Samsan World Sports Complex

=== Gold medal match ===
14 July
13:30

report

Australia	63–57	United States

Samsan World Sports Complex

== Final standings ==
Rank	Team
1	Australia
2	United States
3	Turkey
4	Spain
5	Italy
6	South Korea
7	Great Britain
8	Iran
9	Japan
10	Colombia
11	Germany
12	Argentina
13	Sweden
14	Mexico
15	Netherlands
16	Algeria

== See also ==
- 2014 Women's World Wheelchair Basketball Championship
