= Carter Arey =

American wheelchair basketball player

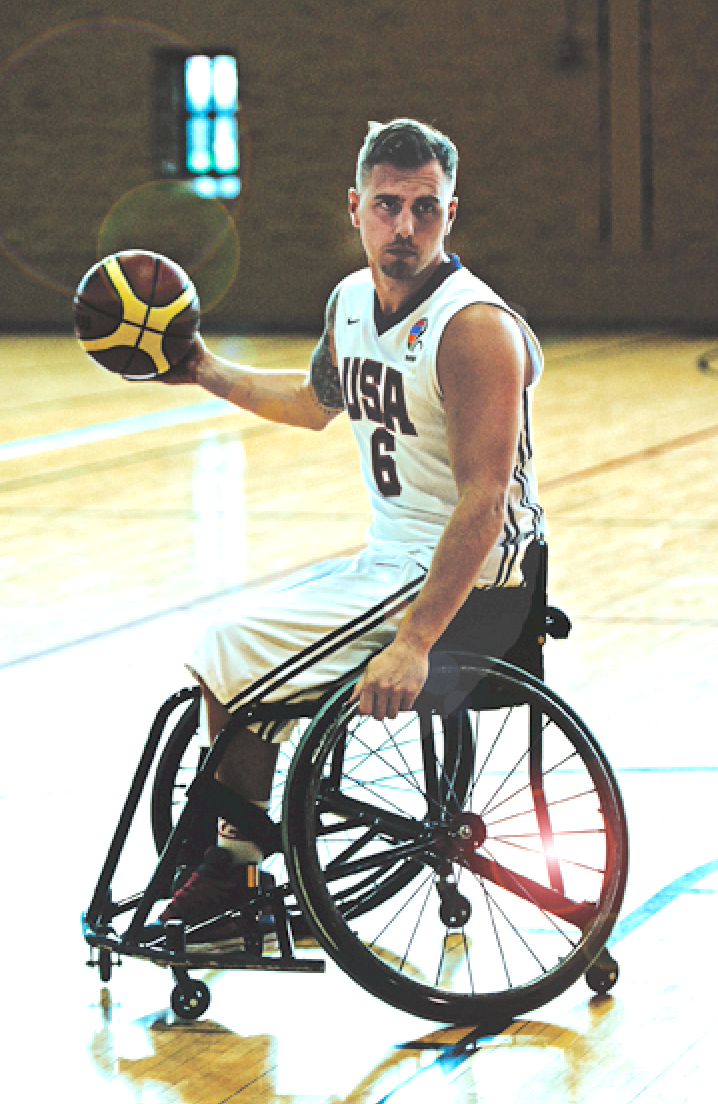
- Carter Arey preparing for 2014 World Championships

Personal information
- Born: December 17, 1989 (age 36) Columbia, Missouri
- Listed height: 6 ft 2 in (1.88 m)

Career information
- College: University of Missouri - Columbia
Medals
Athletics
World Championship
Silver medal – second place	2014 Incheon World Wheelchair Basketball Championship	Men's wheelchair basketball
America's Cup
Gold medal – first place	2013 Americas Cup	Men's wheelchair basketball

Carter Arey (born 1989) is an American wheelchair basketball player.

== Background ==
Carter Arey was born in Columbia, Missouri. Arey attended Rock Bridge High School in Columbia and eventually attended the University of Missouri. Prior to enrollment at the University of Missouri, Arey snuck into the university's recreation center with a friend's ID. While there, Arey was approached by the head coach of the wheelchair basketball team and transferred school to play for the team the following fall semester.

== College career ==
Arey played five seasons for the University of Missouri and earned All-American honors three times (2013–2015). Arey earned "Player of the Year" in 2014 under head coach Ronald Lykins.

== Team USA career ==
Arey has made the final roster for Team USA in 2013, 2014 and 2015. He was a member of the team that won the silver medal at the 2014 Incheon World Wheelchair Basketball Championship, losing to Australia in the finals.

== Personal life ==
Arey currently resides in Columbia, Missouri with his wife and two children.

Arey gained internet fame when he had a chance to kick a 45 yard field goal for $25,000 at the Missouri/Kansas football game on September 6, 2025. Instead of taking the attempt, Arey kicked the ball toward the Kansas sideline and lifted his shirt revealing "F kU" written on his chest.
