= John Boie =

American wheelchair basketball player

Personal information
- Full name: John Harry Antoine Boie
- Born: February 11, 1991 (age 35) Janesville, Wisconsin, U.S.
- Height: 5 ft 3 in (160 cm)

Sport
- Sport: Wheelchair basketball
- Disability class: 1.0
- Coached by: Ron Lykins
Medal record
Men's wheelchair basketball
Representing the United States
Paralympic Games
| Gold medal – first place | 2020 Tokyo | Team |
| Gold medal – first place | 2024 Paris | Team |
World Championship
| Gold medal – first place | 2022 Dubai | Team |
| Silver medal – second place | 2018 Hamburg | Team |
Parapan American Games
| Gold medal – first place | 2019 Lima | Team |
| Gold medal – first place | 2023 Santiago | Team |

John Harry Antoine Boie (born February 11, 1991) is an American wheelchair basketball player and a member of the United States men's national wheelchair basketball team. He represented the United States at the 2020 and 2024 Summer Paralympics.

== Career ==
Boie represented the United States in wheelchair basketball at the 2020 Summer Paralympics and won a gold medal.

He represented the United States at the Wheelchair Basketball World Championship, winning a silver medal in 2018 and a gold medal in 2022.

On March 30, 2024, he was again selected to represent the United States at the 2024 Summer Paralympics. He helped Team USA win their third consecutive gold medal.

He was inducted into the Wisconsin Athletic Hall of Fame in 2026. He became the first adaptive athlete to be inducted into the Hall of Fame.
