= Phil Pratt (basketball) =

British wheelchair basketball player (born 1994)

- Pratt at the 2024 Summer Paralympics

Personal information
- Full name: Philip James Pratt
- Born: 2 February 1994 (age 32)

Sport
- Sport: Wheelchair basketball
- Disability: Transverse myelitis
- Disability class: 3.0
Medal record
Men's wheelchair basketball
Representing Great Britain
Paralympic Games
Silver medal – second place	2024 Paris	Team
Bronze medal – third place	2016 Rio	Team
World Championship
Gold medal – first place	2018 Hamburg	Team
Silver medal – second place	2022 Dubai	Team
Bronze medal – third place	2026 Ottawa	Team

Philip James Pratt (Phil) (born 2 February 1994) is a British wheelchair basketball player and a member of British men's national wheelchair basketball team.

== Personal life ==
Pratt became a wheelchair user aged three after contracting transverse myelitis, an inflammation of the spinal cord.

== Career ==
Recognised Internationally as one of the highest assist providers and elite playmakers in Wheelchair Basketball, Pratt served as flag bearer for Great Britain during the opening ceremony at the 2012 Summer Paralympics. His first major tournament for Great Britain was in 2015 at the World Championships in Korea, subsequently he helped GB to the European Gold in Worcester UK in September 2025. He has subsequently either captained or played in GB teams winning Gold or Silver at the Bi-annual European championships in 2017 (Silver) 2019 (Gold) /2021 (Silver) and 2023 (Gold)

In June 2016, he was selected to represent Great Britain at the 2016 Summer Paralympics and won a bronze medal in wheelchair basketball.

He competed at the 2018 Wheelchair Basketball World Championship where he served as team captain and helped Great Britain win their first gold medal in Wheelchair Basketball World Championship history. During the gold medal game against the United States he recorded 12 points and 12 assists.

He made the decision to miss the 2020 Summer Paralympics after taking time off due to the death of his grandfather. He competed at the 2022 Wheelchair Basketball World Championships, which was delayed until June 2023, and won a silver medal.

He represented Great Britain at the 2024 Summer Paralympics and won a silver medal in wheelchair basketball.

He joined the reigning European Club Champions, Amiab Albacete, and subsequently helped them win a further three consecutive European Champions Cups, only losing one European game in four seasons and becoming the only Team to achieve four consecutive Cup wins in a row to date. At the end of the 2025–26 season, he announced he was leaving Amiab Albacete in a surprise move to Italian Team Asinara Waves.

In September 2026, he competed at the 2026 Wheelchair Basketball World Championships and won a bronze medal. He finished the tournament as leading assist provider registering 88 assists, 20 more than the second placed athlete.
