= Kim Robins =

Australian wheelchair basketball player

Personal information
- Nationality: Australia
- Born: 12 June 1988 (age 38) Perth, Australia
- Height: 1.56 m (5 ft 1 in)

Sport
- Position: Guard
- Disability class: 3.0
- Club: Be Active Perth Wheelcats
Medal record
World Championship
Bronze medal – third place	2018 Hamburg	Team

Kim Robins (born 12 June 1988) is a 3 point wheelchair basketball player from Australia. He represented the Rollers team at the 2020 Summer Paralympics.

== Biography ==
Kim Robins was born on 12 June 1988. He was diagnosed with a neural tube defect when he was about 12 months old. In 1992, as a four-year-old, he was the poster child for a world-first education campaign run by the Telethon Kids Institute to raise awareness about the link between folate and neural tube defects. He has a degree in sports science from Edith Cowan University and a master's in finance from RMIT.

== Basketball ==
He is a 3 point player. At 18, he decided to pursue wheelchair basketball over tennis. He has played wheelchair basketball professionally in Perth and Europe.

His international debut for the Rollers was at 2018 Wheelchair Basketball World Championship in Hamburg, Germany, where they won the bronze medal. His Paralympic debut with the Rollers ended with a win against Turkey for fifth place.

At the 2020 Tokyo Paralympics, the Rollers finished fifth with a win/loss record of 4-4.
