= Gaz Choudhry =

British wheelchair basketball player

Gaz Choudry MBE
Personal information
- Nationality: United Kingdom
- Born: Gaz Choudhry; 23 June 1985 (age 41) Karachi, Pakistan

Sport
- Country: Great Britain
- Sport: Wheelchair basketball
- Event: Men's team
- Club: Capital City Aces
- Team: Bulldogs
Medal record
Representing Great Britain
Paralympic Games
Wheelchair basketball
Bronze medal – third place	2016 Rio	Team BC1-2
Bronze medal – third place	2020 Tokyo	Team BC1–2

Gaz Choudhry MBE (born 23 June 1985) is a British former wheelchair basketball player. He was selected to play for Paralympics GB in the 2012 Summer Paralympics in London.

== Personal life ==
Choudhry was born on 23 June 1985 in Karachi, Pakistan. He was made an amputee (body extremity was removed due to trauma, prolonged constriction, or surgery) when he was ten years old. He moved to Ealing in London with his family when he was thirteen, and attended Walford High School.

== Wheelchair basketball ==
Choudhry began playing wheelchair basketball at the age of thirteen, after seeing a roadshow from the Great Britain Wheelchair Basketball Association. Since then, he has been involved in the sport. He is a class 4.0 wheelchair basketball player. When he competed at a young age, he represented Great Britain in many international tournaments. He won two gold and silver medals at a young age. He was chosen in the All Star team for the European Championships in Adana, southern Turkey.

In 2008, Choudhry was chosen as a reserve for the 2008 Summer Paralympic Games, held in Beijing. Recently before that he had moved to play for a team in Porto Torres, Italy. Choudhry has only competed in two major championships, other than being a reserve (substitute) in the Beijing Paralympics of 2008. His first major championship was the 2010 World Wheelchair Basketball Championship. This championship was held in Birmingham. Along with his team, Choudhry finished in fifth place; out of the medals. However, in 2011, he participated in the 2011 European Championships which were held in Nazareth, northern Israel. This championship was a victory for Great Britain, the team which Choudhry was playing in the championship. He won a gold medal.

He was part of the Great Britain wheelchair basketball side at the 2012 London Paralympics, and for the Rio 2016 and Tokyo 2020 tournaments, the latter two of which ended in the team winning the bronze medal.

Choudhry was appointed Member of the Order of the British Empire (MBE) in the 2022 Birthday Honours for services to wheelchair basketball.

== Acting ==
Choudhry made his acting debut in the Apple TV+ anthology series Extrapolations.
