= United States men's national wheelchair basketball team =

United States
- IWBF zone: Americas

Paralympic Games
- Appearances: 15
- Medals: Gold: 1960 (2), 1964 (2), 1972, 1976, 1988, 2016, 2020, 2024; Silver: 1968; Bronze: 1980, 1996, 2000, 2012

World Championships
- Appearances: 13
- Medals: Gold: 1979, 1983, 1986, 1994, 1998, 2002, 2022; Silver: 1975, 1990, 2006, 2014, 2018; Bronze: 2010
Home	Away

The United States men's national wheelchair basketball team began in 1955 when the Pam Am Jets brought wheelchair basketball to Europe at the International Stoke Mandville Games, albeit in the form of netball. Shortly following the Pan Am Jets' dominating performance at the International Stoke Mandville Games, wheelchair netball was switched to wheelchair basketball for all future Games.

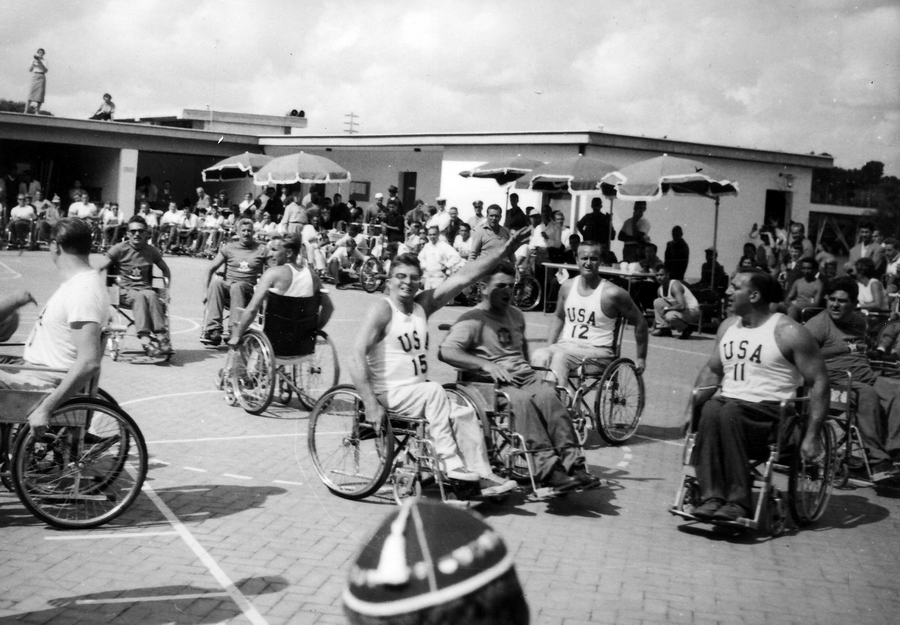
US wheelchair basketball team at Rome 1960

== History ==
In 1960 the inaugural Rome Paralympic Games included wheelchair basketball as one of its initial events. During this inaugural 1960 Paralympic Games the wheelchair basketball competition was divided into two constructs: Class A for athletes with complete lesions, and Class B for those with incomplete lesions. With the 1960 Paralympic Games, the United States Men's National Wheelchair Basketball Team competed in both classifications, winning two gold medals. The same occurred in the following 1964 Tokyo Paralympic Games, as the United States Men's National Wheelchair Basketball Team claimed both gold medals.

The success of the United States Men's National Wheelchair Basketball Team has continued since those initial Paralympic Games, although the team had not won gold medals since 1988 and finally ended that drought in the most recent tournament in 2016.

The United States Men's Wheelchair Basketball Team also competes internationally in the International Wheelchair Basketball Federation's (IWBF) World Wheelchair Basketball Championships, the Parapan American Games, and the IWBF's U23 World Wheelchair Basketball Championships. The United States Men's National Wheelchair Basketball Team has enjoyed great success in each of these tournaments in addition to the Paralympic Games. They are the only team to have won the IWBF World Wheelchair Basketball Championships in three successive tournaments (accomplishing that feat twice; 1979-1986 & 1994-2002) and medalling in nearly every tournament held of the Parapan American Games, as well as the IWBF’s U23 World Wheelchair Basketball Championships.

== Roster ==
The following is the United States roster in the men's wheelchair basketball tournament of the 2024 Summer Paralympics.

United States men's national wheelchair basketball team - 2024 Summer Paralympics roster
Players
Coaches

No.	Name	Age – Date of birth	Pts.
2	Jacob Williams	33 – 2 August 1991	2.5
4	Talen Jourdan	24 – 25 October 1999	1.0
8	Brian Bell	35 – 24 February 1989	4.5
11	Steve Serio	36 – 8 September 1987	3.5
14	Paul Schulte	45 – 5 March 1979	3.0
15	Nate Hinze	36 – 12 June 1988	4.5
16	Trevon Jenifer	35 – 7 September 1988	2.5
24	AJ Fitzpatrick	19 – 28 August 2004	3.0
25	Jorge Salazar	34 – 7 December 1989	3.5
32	Fabian Romo	27 – 22 January 1997	4.0
33	John Boie	33 – 11 February 1991	1.0
44	Jeromie Meyer	27 – 11 April 1997	2.0

Head coach

Robb Taylor

Assistant coach(es)

Scott Meyer

Legend

- Age - describes age on 28 August 2024

== Paralympic Games ==
Results achieved at the Paralympic Games:

- 1960: Gold (2)
- 1964: Gold (2)
- 1968: Silver
- 1972: Gold
- 1976: Gold
- 1980: Bronze
- 1984: 4th
- 1988: Gold
- 1992: ~~Gold~~ (DSQ)
- 1996: Bronze
- 2000: Bronze
- 2004: 7th
- 2008: 4th
- 2012: Bronze
- 2016: Gold
- 2020: Gold
- 2024: Gold

== IWBF World Championships ==
Year	Host	Place
1975	Bruges (Belgium)	Silver
1979	Tampa (United States)	Gold
1983	Halifax (Canada)	Gold
1986	Melbourne (Australia)	Gold
1990	Bruges (Belgium)	Silver
1994	Edmonton (Canada)	Gold
1998	Sydney (Australia)	Gold
2002	Kitakyushu (Japan)	Gold
2006	Amsterdam (Netherlands)	Silver
2010	Birmingham (United Kingdom)	Bronze
2014	Incheon (South Korea)	Silver
2018	Hamburg (Germany)	Silver
2022	Dubai (United Arab Emirates)	Gold

== Other international tournaments ==
=== Parapan American Games ===
Year	Host	Place
1999	Mexico, Mexico City	Gold
2003	Argentina, Mar del Plata	Silver
2007	Brazil, Rio de Janeiro	Gold
2011	Mexico, Guadalajara	Gold
2015	Canada, Toronto	Gold
2019	Peru, Lima	Gold

=== Men's U23 World Wheelchair Basketball Championships ===
Year	Host	Place
1997	Canada, Toronto	Gold
2001	Brazil, Blumenau, Santa Catarina	Bronze
2005	United Kingdom, Birmingham	Gold
2009	France, Paris	Gold

== See also ==
- Wheelchair basketball in the United States
