= AJ Fitzpatrick =

American wheelchair basketball player

Personal information
- Full name: AJ Daxton Fitzpatrick
- Born: August 28, 2004 (age 21) Cedar Rapids, Iowa, U.S.
- Education: University of Wisconsin–Whitewater

Sport
- Sport: Wheelchair basketball
- Disability: Arthrogryposis
- Disability class: 3.5
Medal record
Representing the United States
Men's wheelchair basketball
Paralympic Games
| Gold medal – first place | 2024 Paris | Team |
Parapan American Games
| Gold medal – first place | 2023 Santiago | Team |

AJ Daxton Fitzpatrick (born August 28, 2004) is an American wheelchair basketball player and a member of the United States men's national wheelchair basketball team. He represented the United States at the 2024 Summer Paralympics.

== Early life and education ==
Fitzpatrick attended Prairie High School in Cedar Rapids, Iowa. On May 17, 2022, he signed to play wheelchair basketball at University of Wisconsin–Whitewater. During his freshman season, he was named to the 2022–23 All-Rookie Team. He helped lead the Warhawk's to the 2024 National Wheelchair Basketball Association men's intercollegiate division national championship. He won a gold medal in wheelchair basketball.

== Career ==
In November 2023, Fitzpatrick represented the United States at the 2023 Parapan American Games and won a gold medal in wheelchair basketball. As a result, Team USA automatically qualified to compete at the 2024 Summer Paralympics. On March 30, 2024, he was selected to represent the United States at the 2024 Summer Paralympics.

== Personal life ==
Fitzpatrick was diagnosed with arthrogryposis at birth.
