= Renshi Chokai =

Japanese wheelchair basketball player (born 1999)

Personal information
- Born: February 2, 1999 (age 27) Nagasaki, Nagasaki, Japan
- Listed height: 1.45 m (4 ft 9 in)
- Listed weight: 50 kg (110 lb)
Medals
Men's wheelchair basketball
Representing Japan
Paralympic Games
Silver medal – second place	2020 Tokyo	Team
Asian Para Games
Silver medal – second place	2018 Jakarta	Team

Renshi Chokai (鳥海連志, Chōkai Renshi; born February 2, 1999) is a Japanese wheelchair basketball player. He won a silver medal in Men's wheelchair basketball, at the 2020 Summer Paralympics.

== Biography ==
Chokai had a congenital tibial defect in both legs and a defect in both fingers and had his lower limbs amputated at the age of three. When he was in the first year of junior high school, he was invited by a school official to meet wheelchair basketball, joined the local Sasebo WBC in Nagasaki, and started playing.

Chokai participated in the 2013 Asian Youth Para Games and won second place. He was called up to training camp for the Japanese national team at the age of 15, and after playing an active part in the 2015 IWBF Asia Oceania Championship in Chiba, he became an established player in the national team.

In 2016, while attending Nagasaki Prefectural Osaki High School, Chokai participated in the 2016 Summer Paralympics where he was the youngest player at 17 years and 7 months of age. He became the vice-captain of the men's U23 Japan national team and was selected as one of the top five in the 2017 World Championships. He transferred to Para Kanagawa SC in 2017. He then joined WOWOW in 2019.

In February 2022, Chokai published a memoir/personal development book titled Be Different: Thinking beyond the limits of the Tokyo Paralympics wheelchair basketball silver medalist (In Japanese: "異なれ 東京パラリンピック車いすバスケ銀メダリストの限界を超える思考", ISBN ISBN 9784847071386).
