= Wheelchair basketball at the 2023 Parapan American Games =

Wheelchair basketball competitions at the 2023 Parapan American Games

- Wheelchair basketball pictogram
- Venue: Multisport Complex 1
- Dates: 18 – 25 November 2023
- No. of events: 2 (1 men, 1 women)
- Competitors: 187 from 10 nations

Wheelchair basketball competitions at the 2023 Parapan American Games in Santiago, Chile were held at the Multisport Complex 1 from 18 to 25 November 2023.

The two finalists in the women's tournament and the three medalists in the men's tournament qualified for the 2024 Summer Paralympics.

== Participating nations ==
There are 187 players from 10 nations participating in the games.

- Argentina (24)
- Brazil (24)
- Canada (24)
- Chile (24) (Host)
- Colombia (23)
- El Salvador (7)
- Peru (12)
- Puerto Rico (11)
- United States (24)
- Venezuela (12)

== Medal summary ==
=== Medal table ===
* Host nation (Chile)

Rank	Nation	Gold	Silver	Bronze	Total
1	United States	2	0	0	2
2	Canada	0	1	1	2
3	Colombia	0	1	0	1
4	Brazil	0	0	1	1
Totals (4 entries)		2	2	2	6

=== Medalists ===
Event	Gold	Silver	Bronze
Men's tournament	United States (USA); Jorge Sánchez; Jacob Williams; Talen Jourdan; Brian Bell; Steven Serio; Trevon Jenifer; AJ Fitzpatrick; Jorge Salazar; Peter Berry; Fabian Romo; John Boie; Jeromie Meyer	Colombia (COL); Jhan Quintero; Rodrigo Pérez; Joymar Granados; Yeison Pérez; Jairo Lázaro; Héctor Garcés; Daniel Diaz; Oscar Restrepo; Jhuan Escobar; Jhon Hernández; Jhoan Vargas; Julian López	Canada (CAN); Nikola Goncin; Garret Ostepchuk; Robert Hedges; Vincent Dallaire; Blaise Mutware; Colin Higgins; Lee Melymic; Chad Jassmann; Patrick Anderson; Jonathan Vermette; Tyler Miller; Reed De'Aeth
Women's tournament	United States (USA); Abigail Bauleke; Josephine Dehart; Josie Aslakson; Natalie Schneider; Rebecca Murray; Rose Hollermann; Kaitlyn Eaton; Lindsey Zurbrugg; Emily Oberst; Bailey Moody; Ixhelt González; Courtney Ryan	Canada (CAN); Rosalie Lalonde; Élodie Tessier; Arinn Young; Cindy Ouellet; Tamara Steeves; Puisand Lai; Tara Llanes; Bethany Johnson; Kady Dandeneau; Sofia Fassi Fehri; Melanie Hawtin; Desiree Isaac Pictou	Brazil (BRA); Ana Kelvia de Lima; Cleonete Reis; Perla Assunção; Lucicléia Costa; Oara Uchôa; Lia Soares; Paola Klokler; Vileide Almeida; Ivanilde da Silva; Denise Eusébio; Maxcileide Ramos; Jéssica Santana

== See also ==
- Basketball at the 2023 Pan American Games
- Wheelchair basketball at the 2024 Summer Paralympics
