= Jacob Williams =

American wheelchair basketball player

Personal information
- Full name: Jacob Michael Williams
- Nickname: Jake
- Born: August 2, 1991 (age 34) Milwaukee, Wisconsin, U.S.
- Height: 6 ft 1 in (1.85 m)

Sport
- Sport: Wheelchair basketball
- Disability class: 2.5
- Coached by: Miguel Vaquero; Ron Lykins
Medal record
Representing the United States
Men's wheelchair basketball
Paralympic Games
Gold medal – first place	2016 Rio de Janeiro	Team
Gold medal – first place	2020 Tokyo	Team
Gold medal – first place	2024 Paris	Team
World Championship
Gold medal – first place	2022 Dubai	Team
Silver medal – second place	2018 Hamburg	Team
Parapan American Games
Gold medal – first place	2015 Toronto	Team
Gold medal – first place	2019 Lima	Team
Gold medal – first place	2023 Santiago	Team

Jacob Michael Williams (born August 2, 1991) is an American wheelchair basketball player and a member of the United States men's national wheelchair basketball team.

== Career ==
Williams represented the United States in wheelchair basketball at the Summer Paralympics three times, winning gold medals in 2016, 2020 and 2024. As a result, Team USA became the first men's wheelchair basketball team ever to win three consecutive gold medals at the Paralympics. He was voted the Most Valuable Player of the men's tournament at the Paris 2024 Paralympic Games, averaging 22 points per game, and the leading scorer of the tournament with 132 points.

He represented the United States 2022 Wheelchair Basketball World Championships and won a gold medal.
