= Bill Latham (basketball) =

Australian wheelchair basketball player

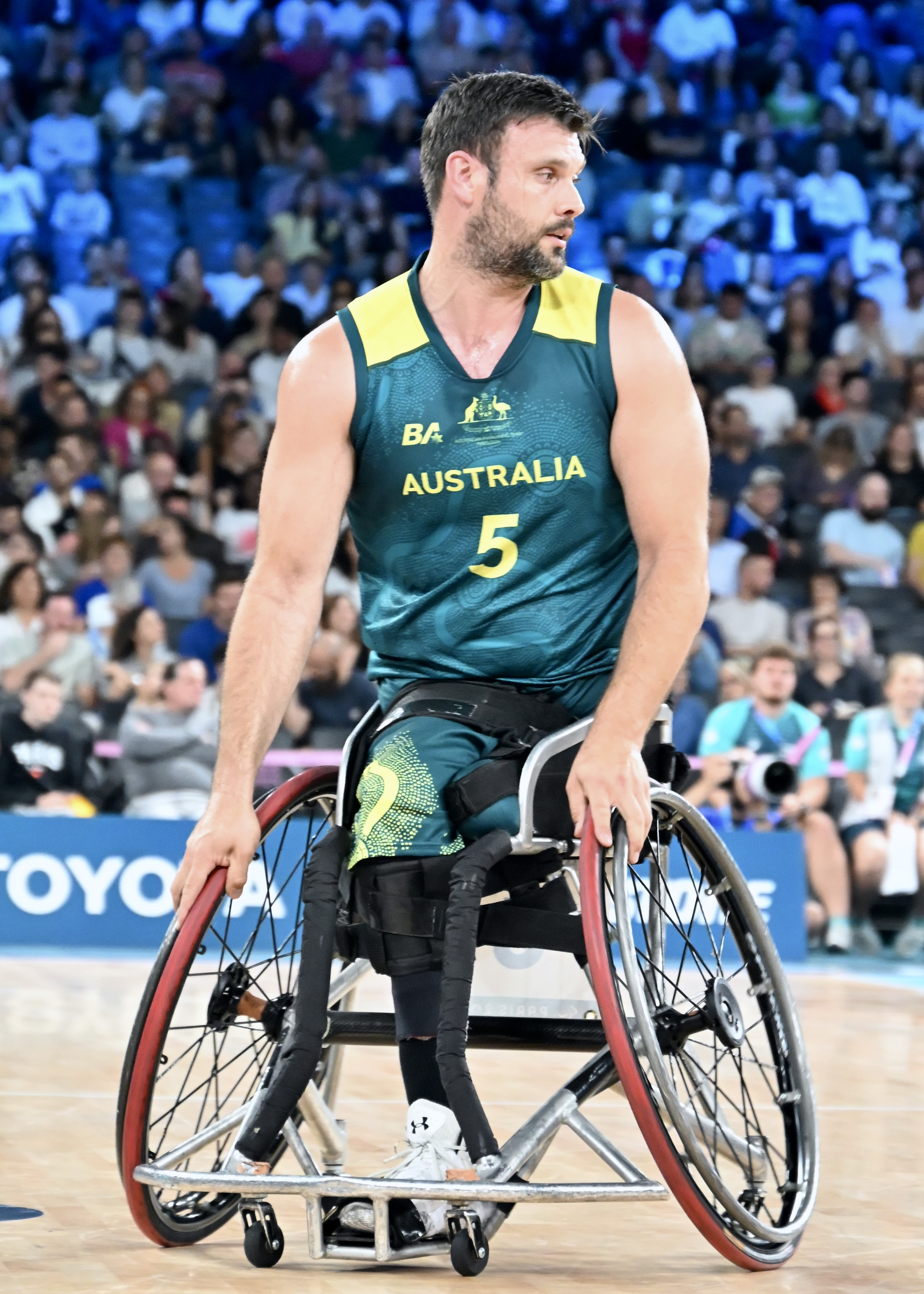
- Latham at the 2024 Summer Paralympics

Personal information
- Nationality: Australia
- Born: 29 October 1989 (age 36)

Sport
- Club: Queensland Spinning Bullets
Medal record
Wheelchair basketball
Paralympic Games
Silver medal – second place	2012 London	Wheelchair basketball
World Championship
Gold medal – first place	2010 Birmingham	Team
Gold medal – first place	2014 Incheon	Team
Gold medal – first place	2026 Ottawa	Team
Bronze medal – third place	2018 Hamburg	Team

Bill Latham (born 29 October 1989) is a 4 point wheelchair basketball player from Australia. He was a member of the Australian national team that competed at the 2010 and 2014 Wheelchair Basketball World Championships that won gold medals. At the 2012 Summer Paralympics he was part of the Australian men's wheelchair team that won silver. He was a member for the Rollers at the 2024 Paris Paralympics, his fourth Games.

== Personal life ==
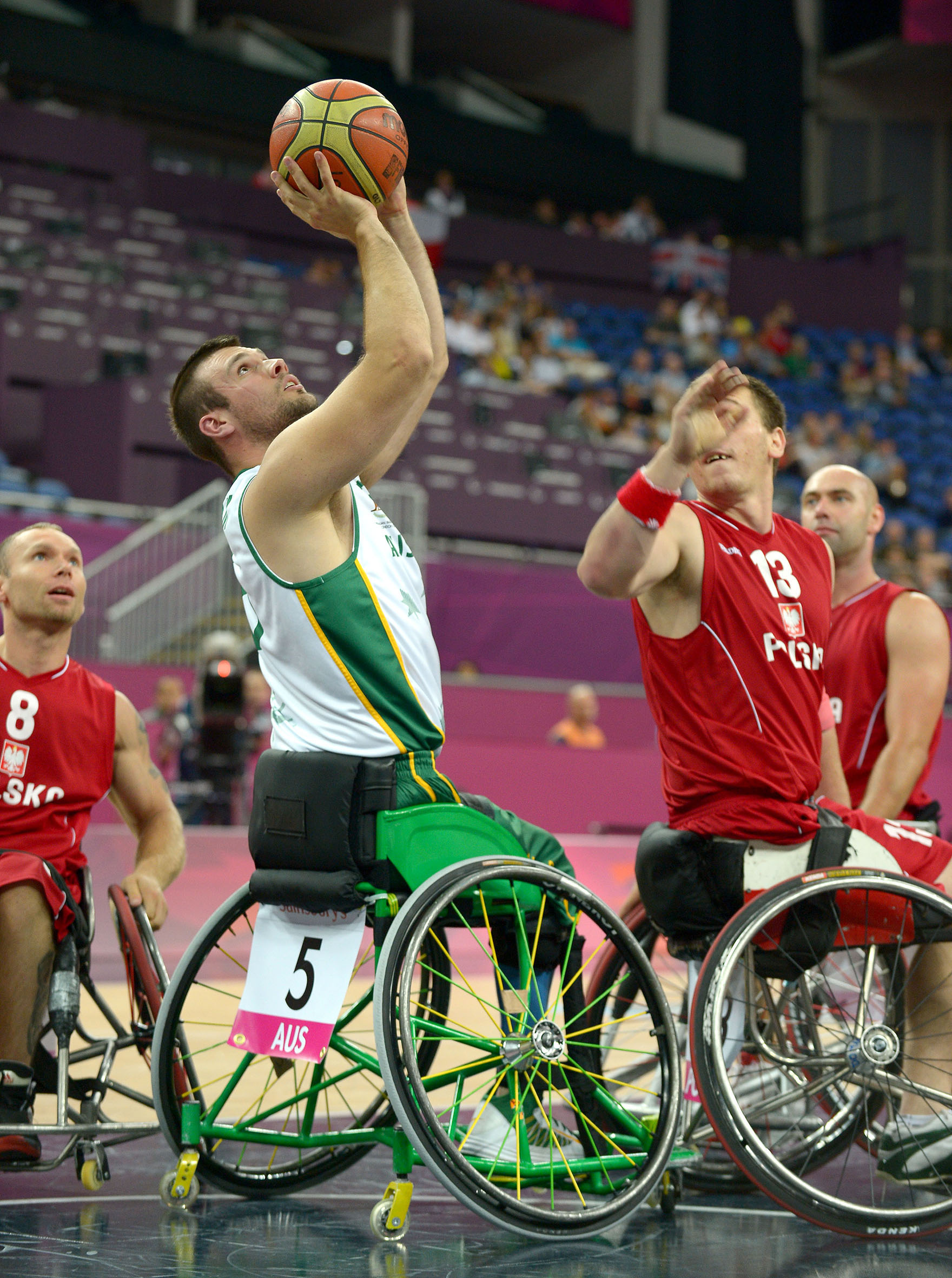
Latham at the 2012 London Paralympics

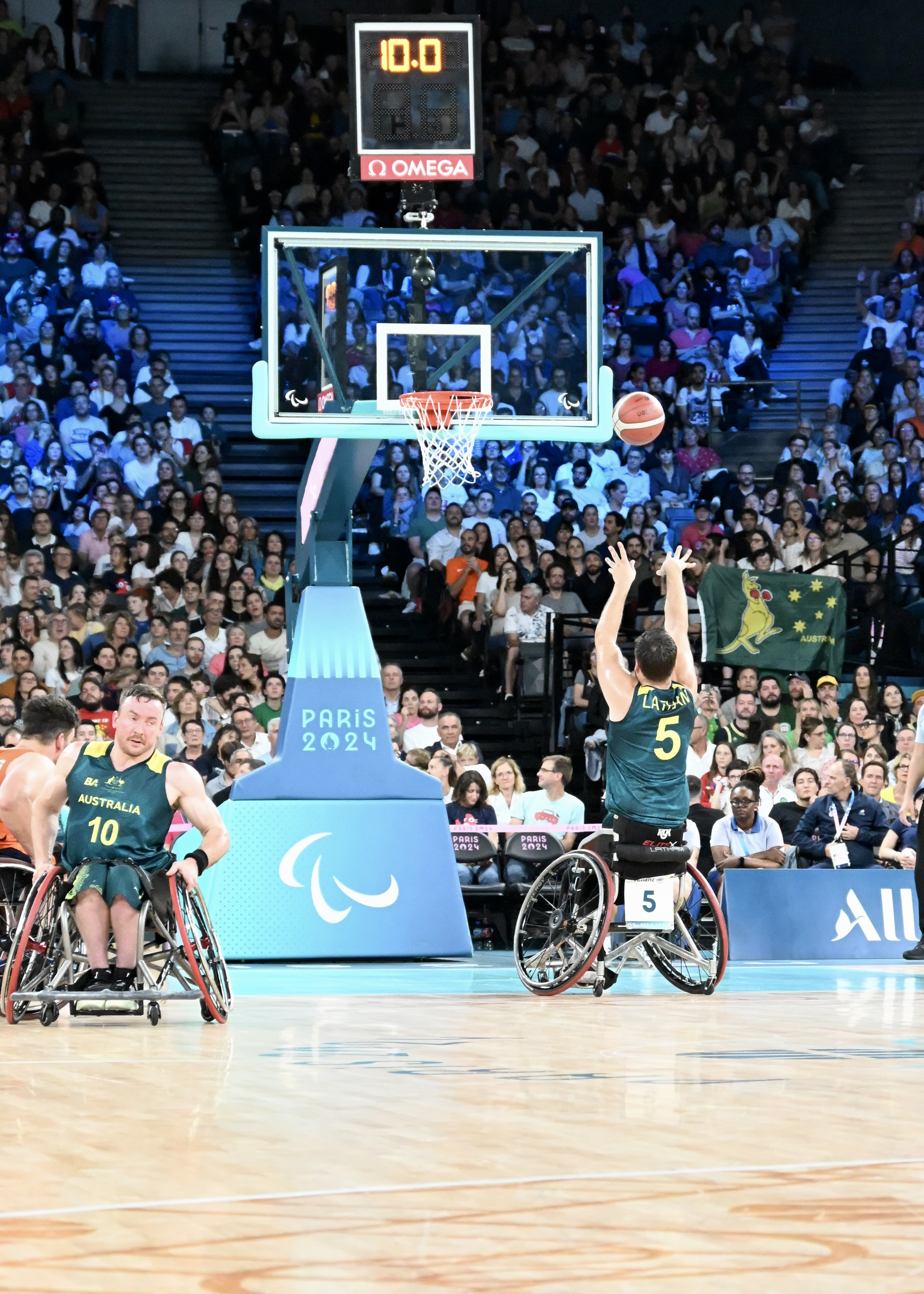
Latham at the 2024 Paris Paralympics

Born on 29 October 1989. As a five year old, Latham severely damaged his left leg in a tractor accident at his family property near Coffs Harbour, New South Wales. At the age of 13, Latham made the decision, with the support of his family, to have his left leg amputated below the knee.

Latham's great-grandfather Tedda Courtney who played rugby league for Australia and was the first coach of the Canterbury Bulldogs.

== Basketball career ==
Before playing wheelchair basketball, he participated swimming, lawn bowls and athletics throwing - discus, javelin and shot put.

Latham is a 4.0 wheelchair basketball player and plays centre/forward. His achievements include silver in the 2012 Paralympics and gold in the 2014 and 2010 World Championships

He was part of the team sent to represent Australia in the 2016 Paralympics where they finished sixth.

In 2018, he was a member of the Rollers that won the bronze medal at 2018 Wheelchair Basketball World Championship in Hamburg, Germany.

At the 2020 Tokyo Paralympics, the Rollers finished fifth with a win–loss record of 4–4. At the 2024 Paris Paralympics, he was a member of the Rollers that finished fifth with a win/loss record of 3-3.

He was a member of the Rollers that defeated Italy 81 - 57 to win the gold medal at the 2026 Wheelchair Basketball World Championships in Ottawa, Canada.
