= Asier García =

Spanish wheelchair basketball player

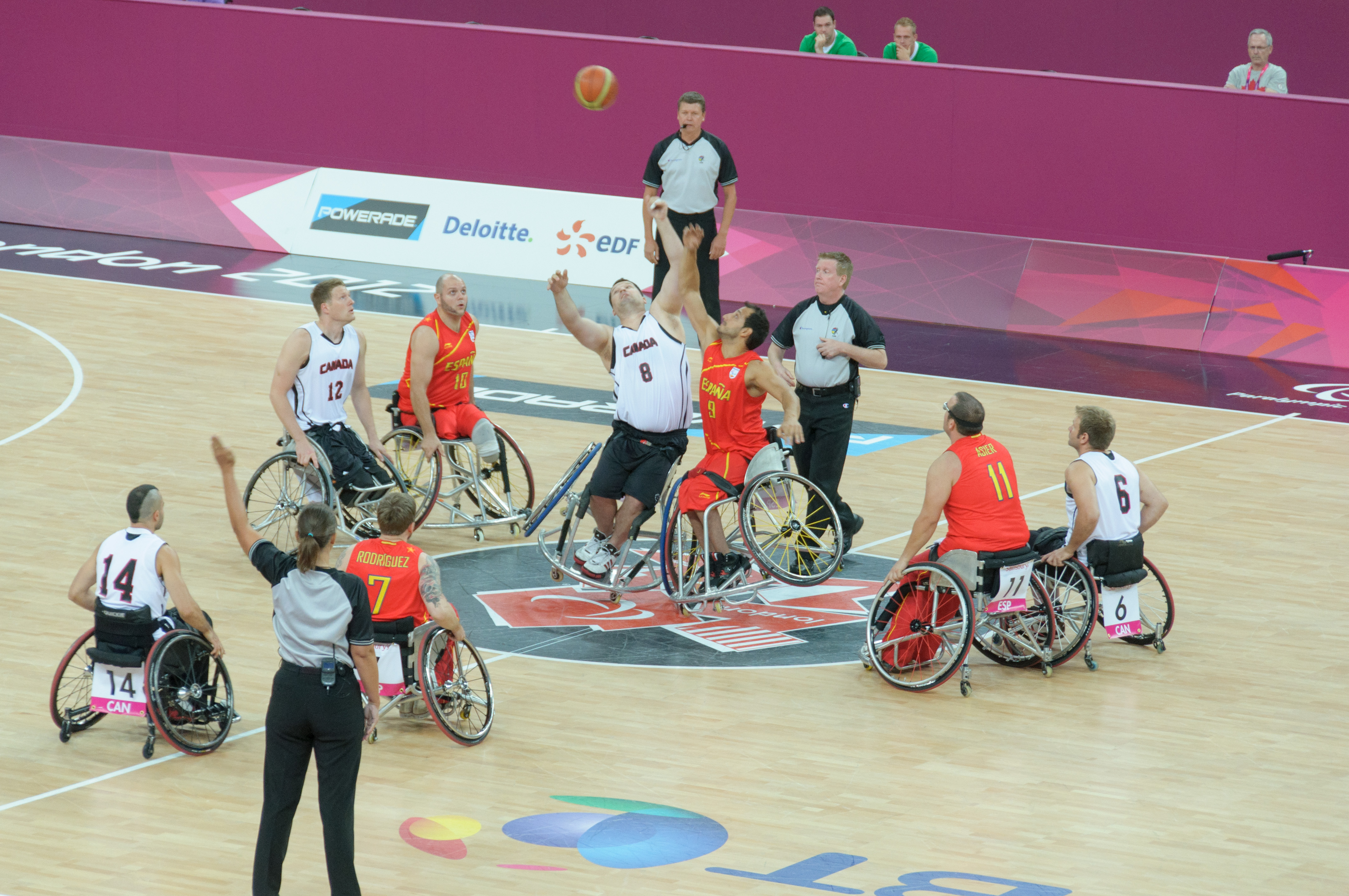
- Garcia playing versuses Canada at the 2012 Summer Paralympics

Personal information
- Full name: Asier García Pereiro
- Nationality: Spanish
- Born: 11 June 1981 (age 45) Pais Vasco, Spain

Sport
- Country: Spain
- Sport: Wheelchair basketball

Asier García Pereiro (Note: In this Spanish name, the first or paternal surname is García and the second or maternal family name is Pereiro.) (born 11 June 1981) is a Spanish wheelchair basketball player. He represented Spain at the 2012 Summer Paralympics as a member of Spain men's national team.

== Personal ==
García was born on 11 June 1981 in Pais Vasco. In 2012, he lived in Madrid.

== Wheelchair basketball ==
García is a 4 point player.

=== National team ===
García competed in wheelchair basketball at the 2012 Summer Paralympics in London. It was the first time the Spanish national team had qualified for the Paralympics in 16 years. In London, he was coached by Oscar Trigo. His team finished fifth overall. He played in the game against Turkey and the United States. He was a member of the national team at the 2013 European Championships. His team finished with a bronze medal after defeating Sweden, and Garcia was the third best performer with an average of 10 points per game, 4 rebounds per game and 6 assists per game. In the game against Sweden, he led the team in scoring with 19 points, rebounds with 8 and had 4 assists.

=== Club ===
In 2009, García played for Fuhnpaiin-Peraleda. During the 2011/2012 season, he played for CID Casa Murcia Getafe. In 2013, he played club wheelchair basketball for Bilbao Basket. In a game against Getafe that season, he led the team in scoring with 26 points. In a game against Mideba Extremadura, he scored 16 points. He scored 4 points in the team's loss to ONCE. In mid-November, Garcia ranked second in the league in average number of rebounds per game with 11.5. He has acted as an ambassador of sorts for the team, encouraging Colombia national team members Daniel Díaz and José Leep to join the team for the 2013/2014 season.
