= Lee Manning =

British wheelchair basketball player (born 1990)

- Manning at the 2024 Summer Paralympics

Personal information
- Born: 11 January 1990 (age 36)

Sport
- Sport: Wheelchair basketball
- Disability class: 4.5
Medal record
Men's wheelchair basketball
Representing Great Britain
Paralympic Games
Silver medal – second place	2024 Paris	Team
Bronze medal – third place	2016 Rio	Team
Bronze medal – third place	2020 Tokyo	Team
World Championship
Gold medal – first place	2018 Hamburg	Team
Silver medal – second place	2022 Dubai	Team
Bronze medal – third place	2026 Ottawa	Team
Men's 3x3 wheelchair basketball
Representing England
Commonwealth Games
Bronze medal – third place	2022 Birmingham	Team

Lee Manning (born 11 January 1990) is a British wheelchair basketball player and a member of Great Britain men's national wheelchair basketball team.

== Career ==
Manning made his Summer Paralympic Games debut for Great Britain at the 2016 Summer Paralympics and won a bronze medal in wheelchair basketball.

He competed at the 2018 Wheelchair Basketball World Championship and helped Great Britain win their first gold medal in Wheelchair Basketball World Championship history.

He represented Great Britain at the 2020 Summer Paralympics and won a bronze medal in wheelchair basketball. During the bronze medal match against Spain, he recorded 11 points and 21 rebounds for a double-double. He again represent Great Britain at the 2024 Summer Paralympics and won a silver medal in wheelchair basketball.

In September 2026, he competed at the 2026 Wheelchair Basketball World Championships and won a bronze medal.
