= Brian Bell (basketball) =

American wheelchair basketball player

Personal information
- Full name: Brian Marceleus Bell
- Born: February 24, 1989 (age 37) Birmingham, Alabama, U.S.
- Height: 6 ft 1 in (1.85 m)

Sport
- Sport: Wheelchair basketball
- Disability class: 4.5
- Coached by: Janet Zeltinger; Ron Lykins
Medal record
Representing the United States
Men's wheelchair basketball
Paralympic Games
Gold medal – first place	2016 Rio de Janeiro	Team
Gold medal – first place	2020 Tokyo	Team
Gold medal – first place	2024 Paris	Team
World Championship
Gold medal – first place	2022 Dubai	Team
Silver medal – second place	2014 Incheon	Team
Silver medal – second place	2018 Hamburg	Team
Parapan American Games
Gold medal – first place	2015 Toronto	Team
Gold medal – first place	2019 Lima	Team
Gold medal – first place	2023 Santiago	Team

Brian Marceleus Bell (born February 24, 1989) is an American wheelchair basketball player and a member of the United States men's national wheelchair basketball team.

== Career ==
Bell has represented the United States in Wheelchair basketball at the Summer Paralympics three, winning gold medals in 2016, 2020, and 2024. As a result, Team USA became the first men's wheelchair basketball team ever to win three consecutive gold medals at the Paralympics.

He represented the United States at the Wheelchair Basketball World Championship, winning silver medals in 2014 and 2018 and a gold medal at the 2022 Wheelchair Basketball World Championships.
