= Tom O'Neill-Thorne =

Australian wheelchair basketball player

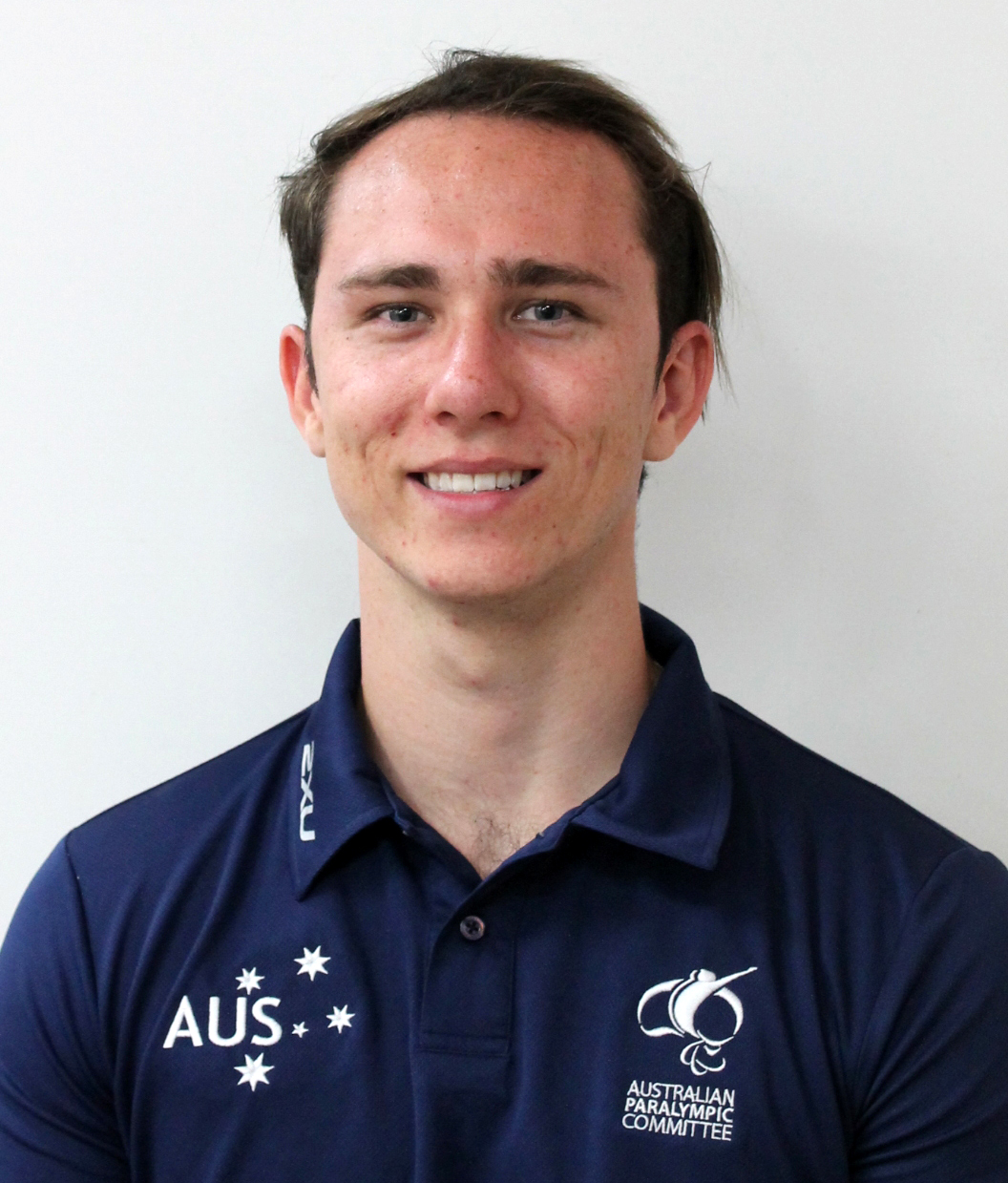
- Photo of Tom O'Neill-Thorne from the 2016 Australian Paralympic Team media guide

Personal information
- Nationality: Australia
- Born: 8 April 1997 (age 29)

Sport
- Position: Point guard
- Disability class: 3.0
- Club: CD Ilunion
Medal record
Representing Australia
Men's wheelchair basketball
World Championship
| Gold medal – first place | 2026 Ottawa | Team |
| Gold medal – first place | 2014 Incheon | Team |
| Bronze medal – third place | 2018 Hamburg | Team |
Men's 3x3 wheelchair basketball
Commonwealth Games
| Gold medal – first place | 2026 Glasgow | Team |

Tom O'Neill-Thorne (born 8 April 1997) is a 3.0 point wheelchair basketball player from Australia. He was part of the Rollers team that won the 2014 Incheon World Wheelchair Basketball Championship. He was a member of the Rollers at the 2024 Summer Paralympics, his third Games.

== Early life ==
Tom O'Neill-Thorne was born on 8 April 1997, with arthrogryposis multiplex, a congenital condition, which he describes succinctly as: "my legs didn't grow properly". By the time he was two years old, he required a wheelchair, but watching the 2000 Summer Olympic Games in Sydney on television, he decided that he wanted to become an athlete.

== Basketball career ==
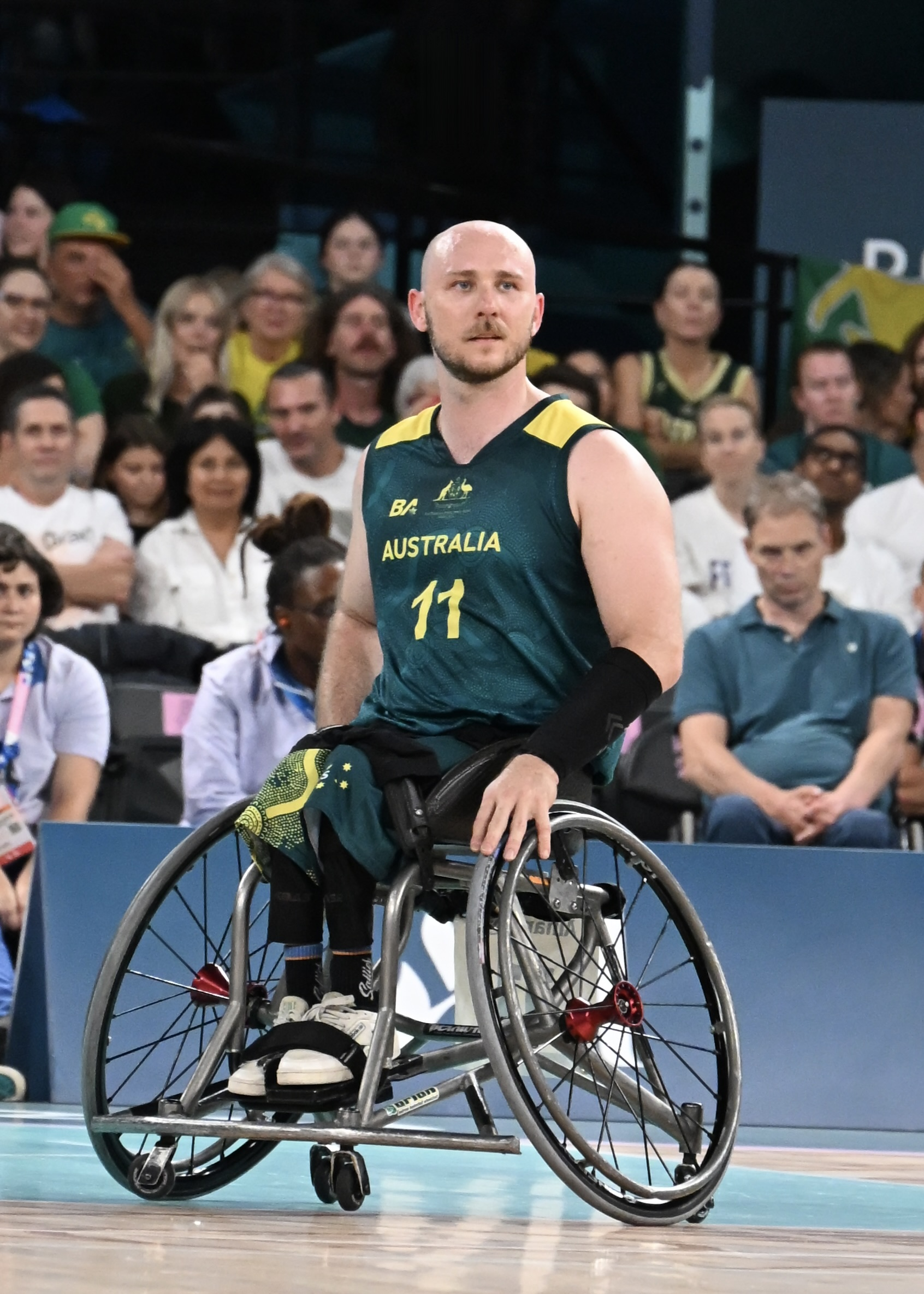
O'Neill-Thorne at the 2024 Summer Paralympics

O'Neill-Thorne took up wheelchair basketball when he was nine, when a local competition was established. He became a member of the Queensland Junior team, then the development squad at the Australian Institute of Sport, and, in 2012, at age 14, of the Queensland Spinning Bullets in the National Wheelchair Basketball League, where he was coached by Tom Kyle. As a 16 year old, in 2013, he averaged 17.1 points per game (eight in the league), 6.5 rebounds and 5 assists per game (sixth in the league).

That year O'Neill-Thorne was selected for his first international tournament, with the U23 team (the Spinners) in Dubai, where the team won gold. In 2013, he was part of the Spinners team at the IWBF U23 World Wheelchair Basketball Championship in Adana, Turkey, where they won bronze. Later that year he made his debut with the senior national team (the Rollers) at the 2013 Asia-Oceania Zone Championships in Bangkok, and the following year was part of the Rollers team that won gold at the 2014 Incheon World Wheelchair Basketball Championship. He was the youngest ever Roller to play in a World Championship.

By 2016, O'Neill-Thorne was averaging 25.86 points per game with the Spinning Bullets. In June 2016, he toured Great Britain for the 2016 Continental Clash against Canada, Great Britain, Japan, the Netherlands and the United States. The Rollers were defeated by the United States, and won silver. In July, he was selected for the 2016 Summer Paralympics in Rio de Janeiro. He was one of five Rollers selected for their first Paralympics where they finished sixth.

In 2018, he was a member of the Rollers that won the bronze medal at 2018 Wheelchair Basketball World Championship in Hamburg, Germany where he averaged 14.5 points, four rebounds and three assists per game.

At the 2020 Tokyo Paralympics, the Rollers finished fifth with a win–loss record of 4–4. At the 2024 Paris Paralympics, he was a member of the Rollers that finished fifth with a win/loss record of 3–3.

He was a member of the Rollers that defeated Italy 81 - 57 to win the gold medal at the 2026 Wheelchair Basketball World Championships in Ottawa, Canada.

O'Neill-Thorne was awarded the Northern Territory Government Sportsperson of the Year at the 2017 Northern Territory Sports Awards.
