= Alejandro Zarzuela =

Spanish wheelchair basketball player

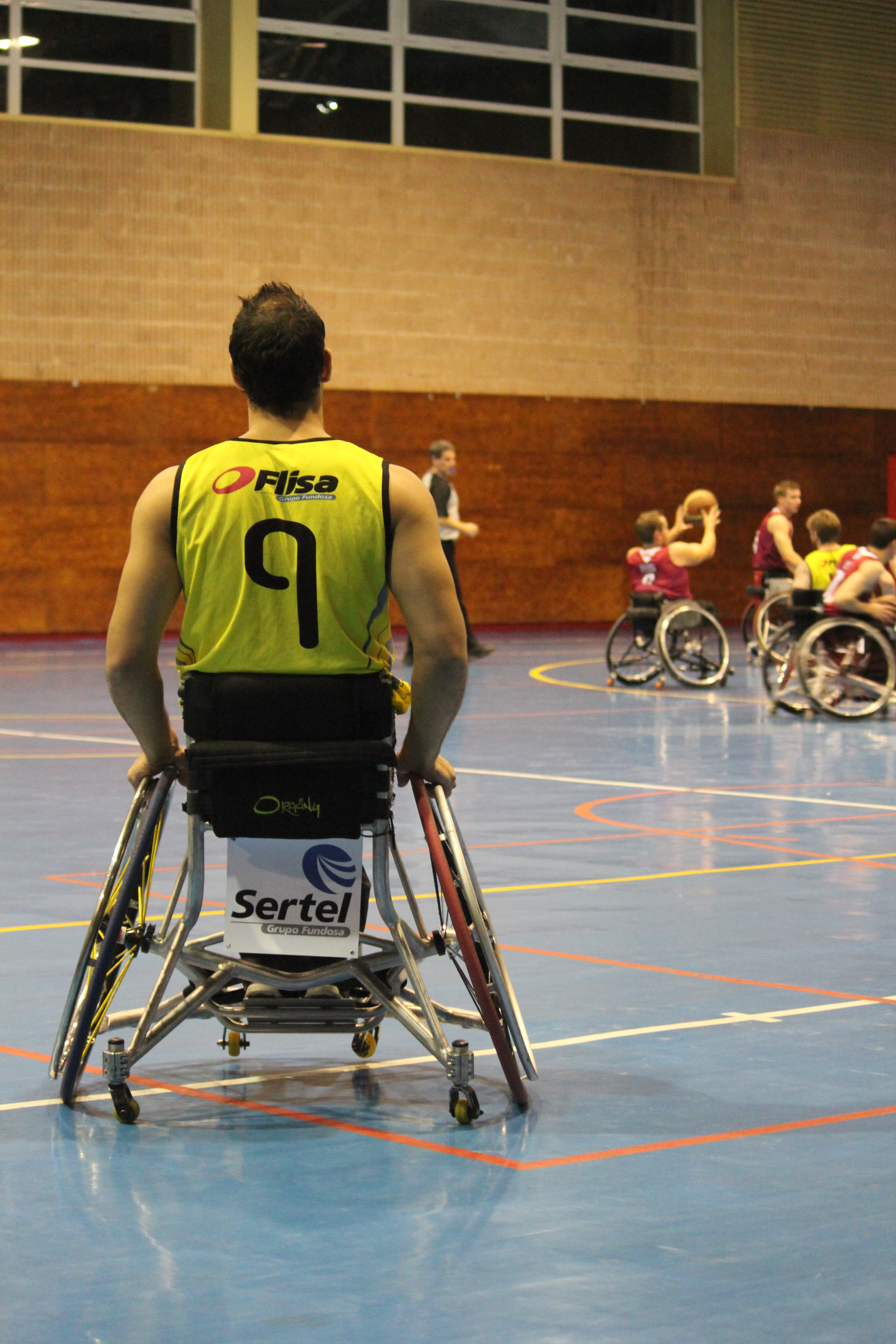
- Zarzuela (9) playing for ONCE in 2013

Personal information
- Full name: Alejandro Zarzuela Beltrán
- Nationality: Spanish
- Born: 2 April 1987 (age 39) Andalucia, Spain

Sport
- Country: Spain
- Sport: Wheelchair basketball

Alejandro Zarzuela Beltrán (Note: In this Spanish name, the first or paternal surname is Zarzuela and the second or maternal family name is Beltrán.) (born 2 April 1987) is a Spanish 3 point wheelchair basketball player. He has represented Spain as a member of the national team at the 2012 Summer Paralympics and at the U-23 European Championships. As a club wheelchair basketball player in Spain, he has played all but two seasons on the same team with his twin brother, Pablo. He has won several Copas del Rey, league championships and a European Champions League.

== Personal ==
He was born in Andalucia. He has a twin brother named Pablo Zarzuela. Both were born with spina bifida. Growing up, he used crutches to get around publicly and then crawled around when at home until he was around 15 years old. He has a scar on his hand from a vase his brother threw at him.

As a youngster, he tried swimming, cycling and archery. He was fairly serious about archery until his brother introduced him to wheelchair basketball. His father, Juan Miguel Zarzuela Iglesias, was a Paralympic archer, representing Spain at the 2004 Summer Paralympics and 2008 Summer Paralympics. After joining a professional wheelchair basketball team at 16, Alejandro and his brother dropped out of school to compete full-time. His mother did not approve of the decision at the time. In 2013, he was preparing to take the entrance exams to study at university.

== Wheelchair basketball ==
Alejandro and Pablo both started playing wheelchair basketball when they were 12 years old in Jerez after Pablo was encouraged by José María Buzón to take up the sport. Pablo and his mother met Buzón at a mall in Jerez de la Frontera. He is a 3 point player.

=== Under-23 national team ===
Playing for the under-23 Spain national team, Zarzuela won a pair European Championships in 2006 and 2008. He earned a silver at the 2009 Paris hosted European Championships.

=== National team ===
Zarzuela was a member of the national team that finished third at the 2011 European Championships. He competed in wheelchair basketball at the 2012 Summer Paralympics in London. He was unable to play with his brother because Pablo had to sit out as a result of having an ulcer. It was the first time the Spain national team had qualified for the Paralympics in 16 years. In London, he was coached by Oscar Trigo. His team finished fifth overall. He played in the game against Germany and was a member of the national team that finished third at the 2013 European Championships after defeating Sweden in the bronze medal game. He was second on the team in scoring in the game versus Swedein 15 points, while having 9 rebounds and an assist. He led the team with an average of 12 points per game, 11 rebounds per game and one assist per game. In 2013, Alejandro was working to qualify with the national team for the 2016 Summer Paralympics with his brother., which only he did. He played in the 2016 squad that won the silver medal, losing to the United States in the final.

=== Club ===
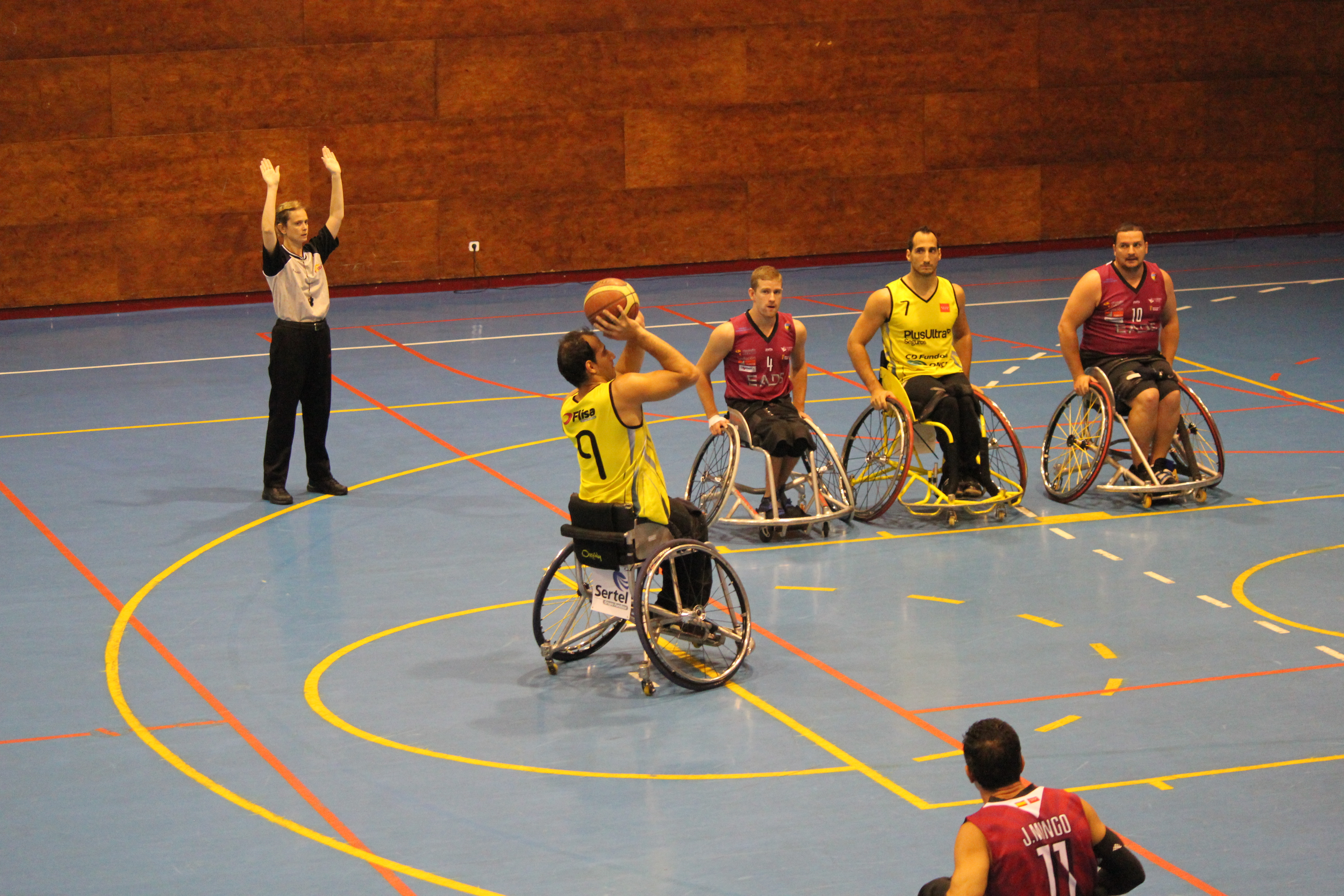
Zarzuela (9) take a free throw shot for ONCE in 2013

When the brothers were 16, they joined ONCE Andalusia. The only seasons the brothers did not play for the same club teams was during the 2007 and 2010 seasons. The brothers played for CB Jerez in the second division during the 1999/2000 and 2000/2001 seasons. They then went to play for Safemi San Fernando during the 2001/2001 and 2003/2004 seasons. Alejandro left the team at the conclusion of the season after helping to guide them up to the División de Honor. He played for División de Honor team ONCE Andalucía during the 2004/2005 season. He was with the team for three years where he won two league championships, two Copas del Rey, and two Copas de Andalucía. During the 2007/2008 season, he played for Peinsa La Unión BSR in Seville. The club folded for economic reasons before the end of the season, which he then completed with BSR Marbella. He played for ONCE Andalucía again during the 2008/2009 season, where he won a Copa del Rey and a league championship. During the 2010/2011 season, he played for Fundación Grupo Norte, where he won the league championship, finished second in the Copa del Ray and finished fourth in the European Wheelchair Basketball Champions League.

In 2011, Zarzuela signed with ONCE in Spain's domestic wheelchair basketball, División de Honor, on the same team as his twin brother. He was with the team again in 2012/2013 and 2013/2014 seasons. The brothers joined the team in 2011. In 2013, played in the game versus Bidaideak Bilbao BSR. During the 2011 season, he averaged 34:37 minutes per game, was second on the team on average number of points per game at 15.7 and led the team in rebounding with an average of 10 per game. In a November 2013 game against Mideba Extremadura, he scored 8 points in an 80–57 victory for his team. He and his brother were viewed as amongst the most dangerous players in the league to play against that season.
