= Gregg Warburton =

British wheelchair basketball player

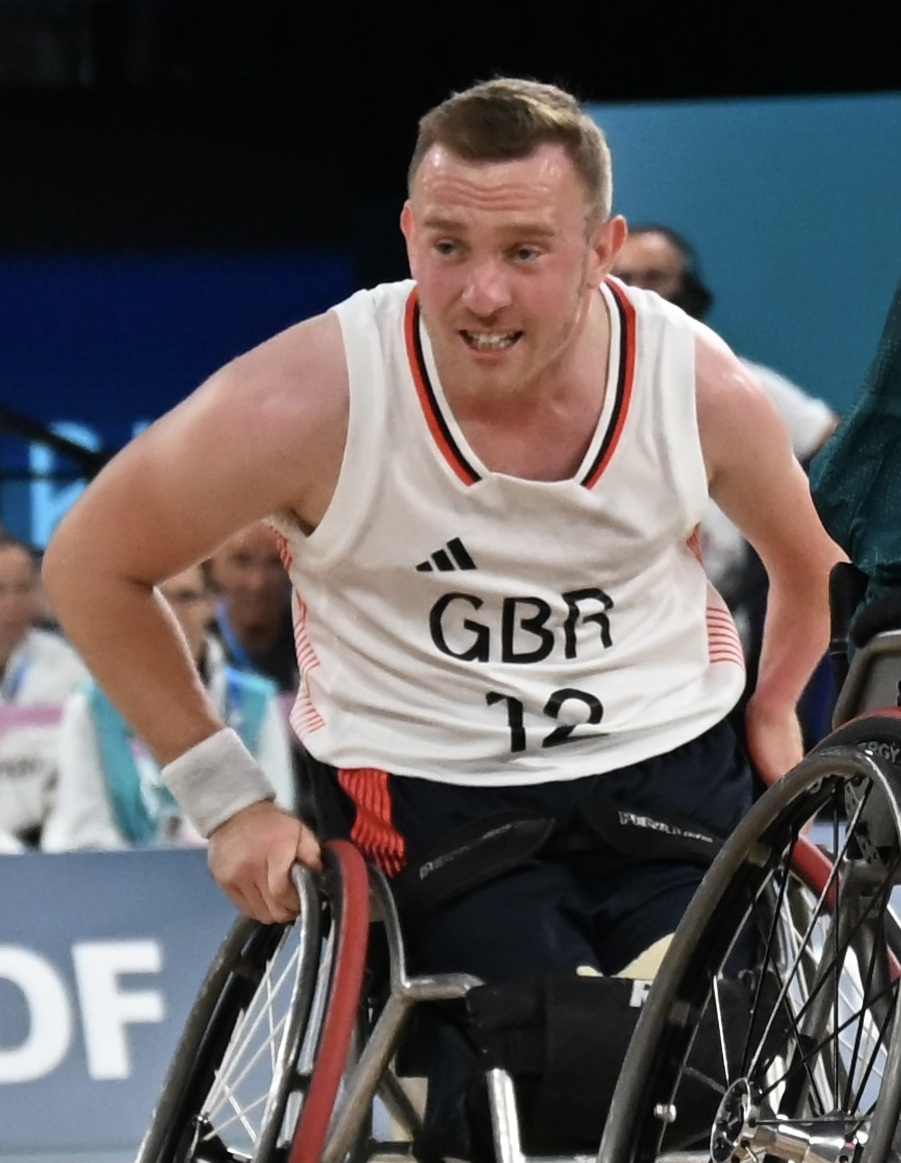
- Warburton at the 2024 Summer Paralympics

Personal information
- Born: 18 November 1996 (age 29)

Sport
- Country: Great Britain
- Sport: Wheelchair basketball
Medal record
Men's wheelchair basketball
Representing Great Britain
Paralympic Games
Bronze medal – third place	2016 Rio de Janeiro	Team
World Championship
Bronze medal – third place	2026 Ottawa	Team

Gregg Warburton (born 18 November 1996) is a British wheelchair basketball player. At the age of 19, he won a bronze medal with Great Britain at the 2016 Summer Paralympics.

== Early life ==
Warburton was born in Leigh, Lancashire on 18 November 1996. He had his feet amputated at around six months old and was born with an abnormality to his left arm, resulting in it being shorter and with only two fingers. Despite this, he began playing wheelchair basketball at the age of 10. While attending The Westleigh School, Warburton and his younger brother Lucas played together with the Manchester Mavericks basketball team. Later, he was selected to represent England North at the 2012 Sainsbury School Games, a multi-sport event for school-aged elite athletes. In the same year, he also played with Great Britain's U22 team as they won a bronze medal game at the U22 European Championships.

== Career ==
Following high school, Warburton enrolled at Wigan and Leigh College to study sports while also competing internationally. He competed with Great Britain at the 2014 Under-22 Wheelchair Basketball European Championships, helping them win a gold medal and individually being named the Disabled Sports Achiever of the Year. In the same year, he also played a role in Great Britain's Junior Men's performance at the Kitakyushu Cup, helping them earn a silver medal. Following this, Warburton made his Paralympics debut in 2016 where he helped Great Britain defeat Turkey in the bronze-medal match. He was subsequently shortlisted for SportsAid's One-to-Watch Award.

Four years later, Warburton played a major role in Great Britain's World Championship win in Hamburg, Germany, and was named Most Valuable Player for the men's tournament. He also moved to Badajoz, Spain to play for Mideba Extremadura in the FEDEDDF Division de Honour.
