= Steve Serio =

American wheelchair basketball player

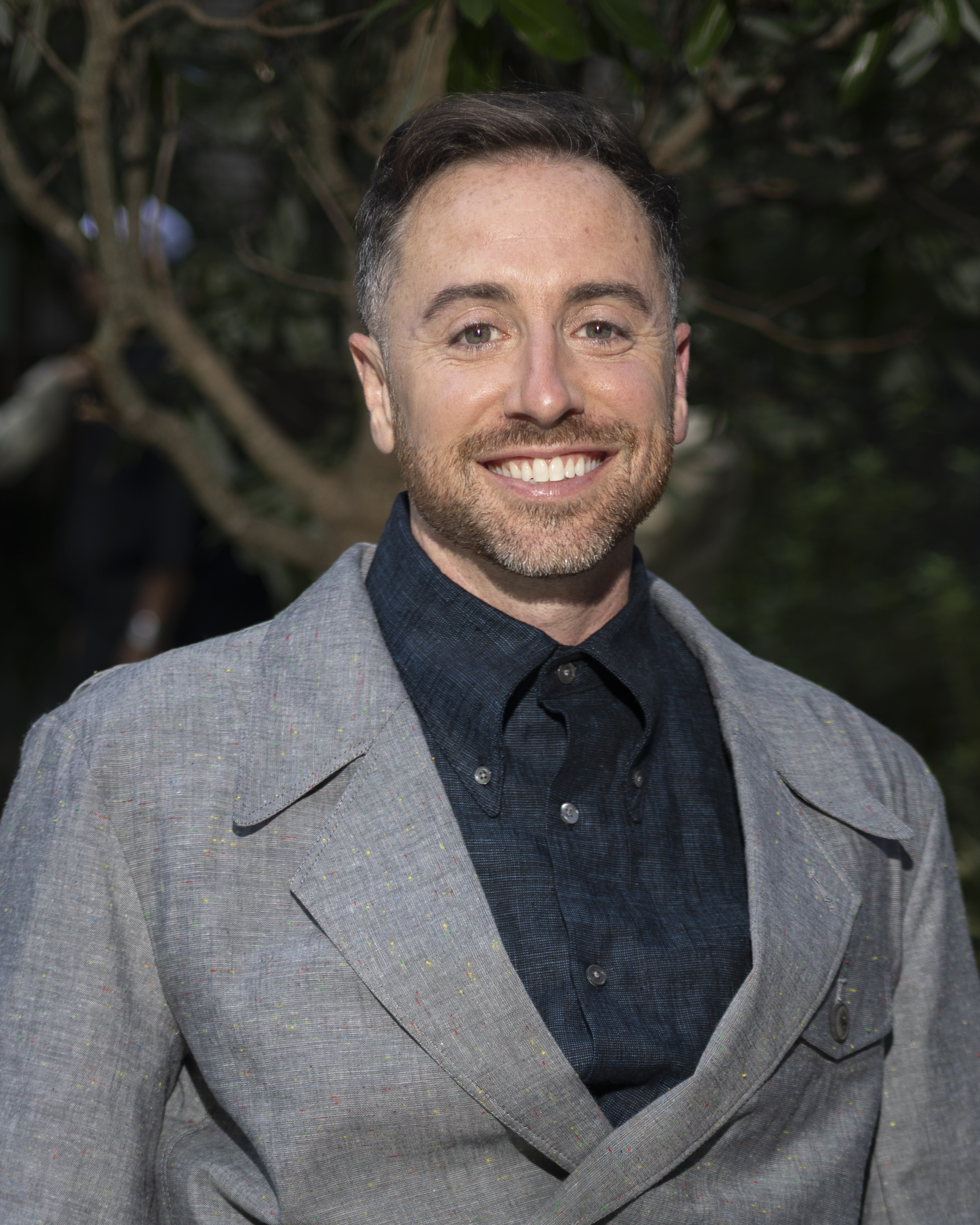
- Serio in 2025

Personal information
- Full name: Steven Dillon Serio
- Nickname: Steve
- Nationality: United States
- Born: September 8, 1987 (age 38) Mineola, New York, U.S.
- Height: 5 ft 6 in (168 cm) (2011)
- Weight: 180 lb (82 kg) (2011)

Sport
- Country: United States
- Sport: Wheelchair Basketball
- College team: University of Illinois at Urbana-Champaign
- Team: Briantea 84
- Turned pro: 2010
Medal record
Men's wheelchair basketball
Representing United States
Paralympic Games
Bronze medal – third place	2012 London	Team
Gold medal – first place	2016 Rio de Janeiro	Team
Gold medal – first place	2020 Tokyo	Team
Gold medal – first place	2024 Paris	Team
World Championships
Gold medal – first place	2022 Dubai	Team
Silver medal – second place	2006 Amsterdam	Team
Silver medal – second place	2014 Incheon	Team
Silver medal – second place	2018 Hamburg	Team
Bronze medal – third place	2010 Birmingham	Team
Parapan American Games
Gold medal – first place	2023 Santiago	Team

Steven Dillon Serio (born September 8, 1987) is a wheelchair basketball player. As a co-captain of the USA Men's National Wheelchair Basketball Team, he led the American men to their first Paralympic gold medal since 1988 at the 2016 Rio de Janeiro Paralympic Games and defended the gold medal at the 2020 Tokyo Paralympics. He currently plays for the New York Rolling Knicks in the NWBA Championship Division.

== Biography ==
Serio grew up in Westbury, New York and graduated from Carle Place High School in 2005. When he was 11 months old, he had surgery to remove a spinal tumor, resulting in the compression of his spinal cord. Consequently, he was left paralyzed and is classified as an incomplete paraplegic.

Serio began his wheelchair basketball career as a sophomore in high school with the Long Island Lightning, the only competitive junior wheelchair basketball team in New York State. He became a tremendous asset to this team, eventually leading to its first National Championship in 2005. Serio himself was named the tournament's Most Valued Player. That same year, Serio played on a USA U-23 Team participating at the Australian Junior National Games for the Disabled in Sydney.

Serio also played point guard for the University of Illinois at Urbana-Champaign. He was named a 2nd Team's All-American in both the 2005–6 and 2006–7 seasons at Illinois. At the National Intercollegiate Wheelchair Basketball Tournament held at Oklahoma State University on March 15, 2008, Serio led the Illinois to a NIWBA Championship over the University of Wisconsin-Whitewater. Serio took home the Championship Game Player of the Game, NWBA Tournament MVP, and the NWBA 31st NIWBT Player of the Year. Serio graduated from the University of Illinois at Urbana-Champaign in May 2010 with a degree in kinesiology.

He also plays on the U.S. Paralympics Men's Wheelchair Basketball Team, which came in second place at the World Championships in Amsterdam in the summer of 2006. In the summer of 2007, the U.S. National Team won a gold medal at the Parapan American Games in Rio de Janeiro.

Serio made his Paralympic debut with the U.S. National Team in 2008 in Beijing. The team finished in fourth place, just missing a medal. Since that disappointing Paralympics, the U.S. National Team has taken the gold medal at the 2009 America's Cup in Richmond, Canada and finished third at the 2010 Wheelchair Basketball World Championship in Birmingham, England.

Serio is a co-captain of the USA Men's National Wheelchair Basketball Team. He led the American men to their first Paralympic gold medal since 1988 at the 2016 Rio de Janeiro Paralympic Games. and defended the gold medal at the 2020 Tokyo Paralympics.

Serio has lived in Germany and played for RSV Lahn-Dill. His contract was extended through the 2016 season. He currently plays for the New York Rolling Knicks in the NWBA Championship Division.

Along with sitting volleyball player Nicky Nieves, Serio served as one of two flag bearers for Team USA at the 2024 Summer Paralympics opening ceremony in Paris.

== Major achievements ==
=== Juniors ===
- 2005: First place - Junior National Wheelchair Basketball Championships
- 2005: Tournament MVP - Junior National Wheelchair Basketball Championships
- 2005: Gold medal - World Junior Basketball Championships

=== Intercollegiate ===
- 2008: National Champion - U.S. Intercollegiate Wheelchair Basketball
- 2008: MVP - NWBA College Division

=== US National Team ===
- 2006: Silver medal - IWBF Gold Cup (World Championships), Amsterdam, the Netherlands
- 2007: Gold medal - Parapan American Games, Rio de Janeiro, Brazil
- 2008: Fourth place - Paralympic Games, Beijing, China
- 2008: First place - North American Cup, Birmingham, Alabama
- 2009: First place - America's Cup, Richmond, BC, Canada
- 2010: Third place - Wheelchair Basketball World Championship, Birmingham, England, UK
- 2012: Bronze Medal - Paralympic Games, London, UK
- 2016: Gold Medal - Paralympic Games, Rio de Janeiro, Brazil
- 2021: Gold Medal - 2020 Summer Paralympics, Tokyo, Japan

=== Professional ===
- 2011: German DRS Cup Champion
- 2011: German Championship
- 2011: IWBF Champions League Silver Medal
- 2012: German DRS Cup Champion
- 2012: German Championship
- 2021: IWBF Champions Cup Champion
