= Wheelchair basketball at the 2016 Summer Paralympics =

Wheelchair basketball at the XV Paralympic Games
- Venue: Carioca Arena 1 Rio Olympic Arena
- Dates: 8 – 17 September 2016
- Competitors: 264 (12 men's and 10 women's teams)

Medalists
1st place, gold medalist(s)		United States (men); United States (women)
2nd place, silver medalist(s)		Spain (men); Germany (women)
3rd place, bronze medalist(s)		Great Britain (men); Netherlands (women)

Wheelchair basketball at the 2016 Summer Paralympics were held from 8 to 17 September at Carioca Arena 1 and the Rio Olympic Arena in Rio de Janeiro.

== Competition format ==
In the men's tournament, twelve qualified nations are drawn into two groups, each consisting of six teams, where each team meets the other teams once. The four highest placed teams in each group advance to a knock-out round to decide the medals 4th to 8th places. The fifth-placed teams meet each other over the 9th and 10th places, and the sixth-placed teams meet each other over the 11th and 12th places.

In the women's tournament, ten qualified nations are drawn into two groups, each consisting of five teams, where each team meets the other teams once, just like the men's tournament. The four highest placed teams in each group advance to a knock-out round to decide the medals and 4th to 8th places. The fifth-placed teams meet each other over the 9th and 10th places.

== Athlete classification ==
Athletes are given an eight-level-score specific to wheelchair basketball, ranging from 1.0 to 4.5. Lower scores represented a higher degree of disability. The sum score of all players on the court cannot exceed 14.

== Teams ==
A National Paralympic Committee may enter up to one men's team with 12 players and up to one women's team with 12 players. The Brazil wheelchair basketball teams receive automatic qualification as hosts. Each of the four zones – Africa, Americas, Asia/Oceania and Europe – is allocated a place. In addition, the top seven men's teams at the 2014 Incheon World Wheelchair Basketball Championship, and the top five women's teams at the 2014 Women's World Wheelchair Basketball Championship on earned a place for their zone. The former event was held on 1–12 July 2014, the latter on 19–29 June 2014. The top seven teams at the men's competition were Australia, United States, Turkey, Spain, Italy, Korea and Great Britain. The top five teams at the women's competition were Canada, Germany, Netherlands, United States and Great Britain.

=== Men ===
Means of qualification	Date	Venue	Berths	Qualified	References
2015 IWBF Africa Championship	30 October – 8 November 2015	(Algeria) Algiers	1	Algeria	
2015 IWBF Asia-Oceania Championship	7 – 18 October 2015	(Japan) Chiba	3	Australia; Iran; Japan	
2015 Parapan American Games	7 – 15 August 2015	(Canada) Toronto	2	United States; Canada	
2015 IWBF Men's European Championship	28 August – 6 September 2015	(United Kingdom) Worcester	5	Germany; Great Britain; Turkey; Netherlands; Spain	
Host nation	2 October 2009	(Denmark) Copenhagen	1	Brazil	
Total			12		

=== Women ===
Means of qualification	Date	Venue	Berths	Qualified	references
2015 IWBF Africa Championship	30 October – 8 November 2015	(Algeria) Algiers	1	Algeria	
2015 IWBF Asia-Oceania Championship	7 – 18 October 2015	(Japan) Chiba	1	China	
2015 Parapan American Games	7 – 15 August 2015	(Canada) Toronto	3	United States; Canada; Argentina	
2015 IWBF European Championship	28 August – 6 September 2015	(United Kingdom) Worcester	4	France; Netherlands; Germany; Great Britain	
Host nation	2 October 2009	(Denmark) Copenhagen	1	Brazil	
Total			10		

== Competition schedule ==
G	Group stage	¼	Quarter-finals	½	Semi-finals	B	Bronze medal match	F	Final

Date Event	Thu 8 Sep	Fri 9 Sep	Sat 10 Sep	Sun 11 Sep	Mon 12 Sep	Tue 13 Sep	Wed 14 Sep	Thu 15 Sep	Fri 16 Sep		Sat 17 Sep	
Men	G	G	G	G	G		1/4	1/2			B	F
Women	G	G	G	G	G	1/4		1/2	B	GM		

== Men's competition ==
The competition consisted of two stages; a group stage followed by a knockout stage.

=== Group stage ===
The teams were divided into two groups of six countries, playing every team in their group once. Two points were awarded for a victory, one for a loss. The top four teams per group qualified for the quarter-finals.

==== Group A ====
Pos	Team	Pld	W	L	PF	PA	PD	Pts	Qualification
1	Spain	5	4	1	341	265	+76	9 (Note: Head-to-head record: Spain 3 pts, +8 PD; Turkey 3 pts, +1 PD; Japan 3 pts, −9 PD)	Quarter-finals
2	Turkey	5	4	1	327	272	+55	9	Quarter-finals
3	Australia	5	4	1	342	293	+49	9	Quarter-finals
4	Netherlands	5	2	3	264	294	−30	7	Quarter-finals
5	Japan	5	1	4	278	300	−22	6	9th/10th place playoff
6	Canada	5	0	5	222	350	−128	5	11th/12th place playoff

Source: Paralympic.org
Rules for classification: 1) Points; 2) Head-to-head results; 3) Points difference; 4) Points scored.

==== Group B ====
Pos	Team	Pld	W	L	PF	PA	PD	Pts	Qualification
1	United States	5	5	0	402	206	+196	10	Quarter-finals
2	Great Britain	5	4	1	364	263	+101	9	Quarter-finals
3	Brazil (H)	5	2	3	309	314	−5	7 (Note: Head-to-head record: Brazil 3 pts, +11 PD; Germany 3 pts, +6 PD; Iran 3 pts, −17 PD)	Quarter-finals
4	Germany	5	2	3	337	314	+23	7	Quarter-finals
5	Iran	5	2	3	295	361	−66	7	9th/10th place playoff
6	Algeria	5	0	5	187	436	−249	5	11th/12th place playoff

Source: Paralympic.org
Rules for classification: 1) Points; 2) Head-to-head results; 3) Points difference; 4) Points scored.
(H) Hosts

=== Knockout stage ===
The knockout stage was a single-elimination tournament consisting of three rounds. Semi-final losers played for the bronze medal.

Quarterfinals
14 September
Spain	70
Germany	66
14 September
Great Britain	74
Australia	51
14 September
Turkey	65
Brazil	49
14 September
United States	70
Netherlands	37

Semifinals
15 September
Spain	69
Great Britain	63
15 September
Turkey	54
United States	74

Gold medal
17 September
Spain	52
United States	68
Bronze medal
17 September
Great Britain	82
Turkey	76

== Women's competition ==
The competition consisted of two stages; a group stage followed by a knockout stage.

=== Group stage ===
The teams were divided into two groups of five countries, playing every team in their group once. Two points were awarded for a victory, one for a loss. The top four teams per group qualified for the quarter-finals.

==== Group A ====
Pos	Team	Pld	W	L	PF	PA	PD	Pts	Qualification
1	Germany	4	3	1	248	156	+92	7 (Note: Head-to-head record: Germany 3 pts, +9 PD; Great Britain 3 pts, −2 PD; Canada 3 pts, −7 PD)	Quarter-finals
2	Great Britain	4	3	1	228	140	+88	7	Quarter-finals
3	Canada	4	3	1	252	181	+71	7	Quarter-finals
4	Brazil (H)	4	1	3	196	241	−45	5	Quarter-finals
5	Argentina	4	0	4	87	296	−209	4	9th/10th place playoff

Source: Paralympic.org
Rules for classification: 1) Points; 2) Head-to-head results; 3) Points difference; 4) Points scored.
(H) Hosts

==== Group B ====
Pos	Team	Pld	W	L	PF	PA	PD	Pts	Qualification
1	United States	4	4	0	288	138	+150	8	Quarter-finals
2	Netherlands	4	3	1	300	148	+152	7	Quarter-finals
3	China	4	2	2	212	187	+25	6	Quarter-finals
4	France	4	1	3	178	266	−88	5	Quarter-finals
5	Algeria	4	0	4	93	332	−239	4	9th/10th place playoff

Source: Paralympic.org
Rules for classification: 1) Points; 2) Head-to-head results; 3) Points difference; 4) Points scored.

=== Knockout stage ===
The knockout stage was a single-elimination tournament consisting of three rounds. Semi-final losers played for the bronze medal.

Quarter-finals
13 September
Germany	76
France	28
13 September
Netherlands	78
Canada	60
13 September
Great Britain	57
China	38
13 September
United States	66
Brazil	35

Semi-finals
15 September
Germany	55
Netherlands	45
15 September
Great Britain	78
United States	89

Gold medal
16 September
Germany	45
United States	62
Bronze medal
16 September
Netherlands	76
Great Britain	34

== Medal summary ==
=== Medal table ===
Rank	Nation	Gold	Silver	Bronze	Total
1	United States	2	0	0	2
2	Germany	0	1	0	1
2	Spain	0	1	0	1
4	Great Britain	0	0	1	1
4	Netherlands	0	0	1	1
Totals (5 entries)		2	2	2	6

=== Events ===
Event	Gold	Silver	Bronze
Men's team	United States (USA)	Spain (ESP)	Great Britain (GBR)
Women's team	United States (USA)	Germany (GER)	Netherlands (NED)

== See also ==
- Basketball at the 2016 Summer Olympics
