= Wheelchair basketball at the Summer Paralympics =

- Governing body: IWBF
- Events: 2 (men: 1; women: 1)

Games
- 1960; 1964; 1968; 1972; 1976; 1980; 1984; 1988; 1992; 1996; 2000; 2004; 2008; 2012; 2016; 2020; 2024
- Medalists

Wheelchair basketball has been contested at the Summer Paralympic Games since the 1960 Summer Paralympics in Rome.

Winning the Paralympics is considered to be the highest honor in international wheelchair basketball, followed by the World Championships of the International Wheelchair Basketball Federation (IWBF) for men and women and the respective intercontinental championships.

== Events ==
In the first two Paralympic games, there were two men's events (Class A and B). Since the Paralympic games of 1968, there are two events, a men's event and a women's event.

Current events

- Men's team
- Women's team

== Qualification ==
- 1960 - 1988 : No Qualification
- 1992 - Ongoing: World and Zonal Qualification

== Medalists ==
Medal winning athletes for every Summer Games since 1960 are as follows:

=== Men's team ===
==== Class A ====
Year	Gold	Silver	Bronze
1960 Rome	United States	Great Britain	Israel
1964 Tokyo	United States	Great Britain	Israel

==== Class B ====
Year	Gold	Silver	Bronze
1960 Rome	United States	Netherlands	Great Britain
1964 Tokyo	United States	Argentina	Israel

==== Men's team ====
Year	Gold	Silver	Bronze
1968 Tel Aviv	Israel	United States	Great Britain
1972 Heidelberg	United States	Israel	Argentina
1976 Toronto	United States	Israel	France
1980 Arnhem	Israel	Netherlands	United States
1984 Stoke Mandeville	France	Netherlands	Sweden
1988 Seoul	United States	Netherlands	France
1992 Barcelona	Netherlands	Germany	France
1996 Atlanta	Australia	Great Britain	United States
2000 Sydney	Canada	Netherlands	United States
2004 Athens	Canada	Australia	Great Britain
2008 Beijing	Australia	Canada	Great Britain
2012 London	Canada	Australia	United States
2016 Rio	United States	Spain	Great Britain
2020 Tokyo	United States	Japan	Great Britain
2024 Paris	United States	Great Britain	Germany

=== Women's team ===
Year	Gold	Silver	Bronze
1968 Tel Aviv	Israel	Argentina	United States
1972 Heidelberg	Argentina	Jamaica	Israel
1976 Toronto	Israel	West Germany	Argentina
1980 Arnhem	West Germany	Israel	United States
1984 Stoke Mandeville	West Germany	Israel	Japan
1988 Seoul	United States	West Germany	Netherlands
1992 Barcelona	Canada	United States	Netherlands
1996 Atlanta	Canada	Netherlands	United States
2000 Sydney	Canada	Australia	Japan
2004 Athens	United States	Australia	Canada
2008 Beijing	United States	Germany	Australia
2012 London	Germany	Australia	Netherlands
2016 Rio	United States	Germany	Netherlands
2020 Tokyo	Netherlands	China	United States
2024 Paris	Netherlands	United States	China

== Medals ==
=== Men (Class A & Class B) (1960–1964) ===
Rank	Nation	Gold	Silver	Bronze	Total
1	United States	4	0	0	4
2	Great Britain	0	2	1	3
3	Argentina	0	1	0	1
3	Netherlands	0	1	0	1
5	Israel	0	0	3	3
Totals (5 entries)		4	4	4	12

=== Men (1968–2024) ===
Rank	Nation	Gold	Silver	Bronze	Total
1	United States	6	1	4	11
2	Canada	3	1	0	4
3	Australia	2	2	0	4
3	Israel	2	2	0	4
5	Netherlands	1	4	0	5
6	France	1	0	3	4
7	Great Britain	0	2	5	7
8	Germany	0	1	1	2
9	Japan	0	1	0	1
9	Spain	0	1	0	1
11	Argentina	0	0	1	1
11	Sweden	0	0	1	1
Totals (12 entries)		15	15	15	45

=== Women (1968–2024) ===
Rank	Nation	Gold	Silver	Bronze	Total
1	United States	4	2	4	10
2	Germany	3	4	0	7
3	Canada	3	0	1	4
4	Israel	2	2	1	5
5	Netherlands	2	1	4	7
6	Argentina	1	1	1	3
7	Australia	0	3	1	4
8	China	0	1	1	2
9	Jamaica	0	1	0	1
10	Japan	0	0	2	2
Totals (10 entries)		15	15	15	45

=== Total (1960–2024) ===
Rank	Nation	Gold	Silver	Bronze	Total
1	United States (USA)	14	3	8	25
2	Canada (CAN)	6	1	1	8
3	Israel (ISR)	4	4	4	12
4	Netherlands (NED)	3	6	4	13
5	Germany (GER)	3	5	1	9
6	Australia (AUS)	2	5	1	8
7	Argentina (ARG)	1	2	2	5
8	France (FRA)	1	0	3	4
9	Great Britain (GBR)	0	4	6	10
10	Japan (JPN)	0	1	2	3
11	China (CHN)	0	1	1	2
12	Jamaica (JAM)	0	1	0	1
12	Spain (ESP)	0	1	0	1
14	Sweden (SWE)	0	0	1	1
Totals (14 entries)		34	34	34	102

== Nations ==
=== 1960–1964 ===
==== Men Class A ====
Year	1st	2nd	3rd	4th	5th	6th	7th
1960	USA	GBR	ISR	NED	AUT		
1964	USA	GBR	ISR	FRA	BEL	PHI	JPN

==== Men Class B ====
Year	1st	2nd	3rd	4th	5th	6th	7th	8th	9th	10th
1960	USA	NED	GBR	ARG	AUS	BEL	FRA	ITA	MLT	SUI
1964	USA	ARG	ISR	ITA	GBR	JPN				

=== 1968–Ongoing ===
==== Men ====
https://www.wheelchairbasketball.ca/wp-content/uploads/2016/01/Paralympic-Games-Results-1960-2012.pdf

1. 1968: 13 Teams
2. 1972: Division I 9 Teams / Division II 10 Teams
3. 1976: 21 Teams
4. 1980: 17 Teams
5. 1984: 18 Teams
6. 1988: 17 Teams
7. 1992: 12 Teams
8. 1996: 12 Teams
9. 2000: 12 Teams
10. 2004: 12 Teams
11. 2008: 12 Teams
12. 2012: 12 Teams
13. 2016: 12 Teams
14. 2020: 12 Teams
15. 2024: 8 Teams

Years	Teams
1960	United States - United Kingdom - Israel - Netherlands
1964	United States - United Kingdom - Israel - Argentina
1968	United States - United Kingdom - West Germany - Switzerland - Israel - France - Netherlands - Belgium - Canada - Sweden - Italy - Argentina - Australia
1972	Argentina - United Kingdom - Sweden - Netherlands - Italy - United States - Israel - France - Australia - Belgium - Spain - Canada - Portugal - Switzerland - West Germany - Brazil - Jamaica - Yugoslavia - Ireland
1976	Israel - Netherlands - Mexico - Italy - Colombia - France - Canada - Switzerland - Finland - South Africa - Argentina - United Kingdom - West Germany - Spain - Denmark - United States - Sweden - Belgium- Brazil - Japan - Australia
1980	United States - Japan - Spain - Australia - Italy - Israel - Argentina - Belgium - West Germany - Netherlands - Canada - Denmark - Brazil - France - Sweden - United Kingdom - Egypt
1984	Canada - United States - Italy - Switzerland - Finland - Israel - West Germany - Mexico - Spain - United Kingdom - France - Australia - Japan - Egypt - Sweden - Netherlands - Yugoslavia - Denmark
1988	United States - Sweden - United Kingdom - Brazil - France - West Germany - Australia- Argentina - Morocco - Netherlands - Israel - Spain - South Korea - Canada Japan - Belgium - Mexico
1992	Netherlands - France - Germany - Sweden - Australia - Israel - United States - United Kingdom - Canada - Spain - Japan - Argentina
1996	Spain - Australia - United Kingdom - Canada - Mexico - Argentina - United States - France - Netherlands - Japan - Sweden
2000	Canada - United States - United Kingdom - Germany - Mexico - South Africa - Netherlands - France - Australia - Sweden- Japan - South Korea
2004	Canada - Australia - Italy United Kingdom - Brazil - France - Netherlands - United States - Germany - Japan - Iran - Greece
2008	Canada - Germany - Iran - Japan - South Africa - Sweden - Australia - United Kingdom - United States - Israel - Brazil - China
2012	Australia - Canada - Colombia - Germany - United Kingdom - Italy - Japan - Spain - Poland - Turkey - United States - South Africa
2016	Spain - Turkey - Australia - Netherlands - Japan - Canada - United States - United Kingdom - Brazil - Germany - Iran - Algeria
2020	

==== Women ====
Year	1st	2nd	3rd	4th	5th	6th	7th	8th	9th	10th
1972	ARG	JAM	ISR	GER	CAN	GBR	YUG			
1976	ISR	GER	ARG	CAN	USA					
1980	GER	ISR	USA	ARG						
1984	GER	ISR	JPN	CAN	USA	NED				
1988	USA	GER	NED	CAN	JPN	ISR	SWE	ARG	GBR	
1992	CAN	USA	AUS	NED	GER	GBR	JPN	FRA	ISR	ESP
1996	CAN	NED	USA	AUS	JPN	GBR	GER	BRA		
2000	CAN	AUS	JPN	NED	USA	MEX	GER	GBR		
2004	USA	AUS	CAN	GER	NED	JPN	MEX	FRA		
2008	USA	GER	AUS	JPN	CAN	NED	CHN	GBR	MEX	BRA
2012	GER	AUS	NED	USA	CHN	CAN	GBR	MEX	GER	FRA
2016	USA	GER	NED	GBR	CAN	CHN	BRA	FRA	ARG	ALG
2020	NED	CHN	USA	GER	CAN	JPN	GBR	ESP	AUS	ALG
2024	NED	USA	CHN							

== See also ==
- Basketball at the Summer Olympics
- Basketball ID at the Summer Paralympics
- Wheelchair Basketball World Championship
- Asia Oceania Zone (AOZ) Wheelchair Basketball Championship
- Africa Wheelchair Basketball Championship
- European Wheelchair Basketball Championship
- Pan American Wheelchair Basketball Championship
