= Michael Paye =

American wheelchair basketball player

Personal information
- Nickname: Mike
- Nationality: American
- Born: March 24, 1983 (age 43) Detroit, Michigan, U.S.
- Height: 5 ft 4 in (1.63 m)

Sport
- Sport: Wheelchair basketball
- Disability: Arthrogryposis
- Disability class: 3.0
- Coached by: Ron Lykins
Medal record
Representing the United States
Men's wheelchair basketball
Paralympic Games
Gold medal – first place	2016 Rio de Janeiro	Team
Gold medal – first place	2020 Tokyo	Team
Bronze medal – third place	2012 London	Team
World Championship
Silver medal – second place	2006 Amsterdam	Team
Silver medal – second place	2014 Incheon	Team
Silver medal – second place	2018 Hamburg	Team
Bronze medal – third place	2010 Birmingham	Team
Parapan American Games
Gold medal – first place	2011 Guadalajara	Team
Gold medal – first place	2019 Lima	Team

Michael Paye (born March 24, 1983) is an American wheelchair basketball player and a member of the United States men's national wheelchair basketball team.

== Career ==
Paye has represented the United States at the Wheelchair Basketball World Championship four times, winning silver medals in 2006, 2014 and 2018 and a bronze medal in 2010.

Paye has represented the United States in Wheelchair basketball at the Summer Paralympics five times, finishing in seventh place in 2004, fourth place in 2008, winning a bronze medal in 2012 and gold medals in 2016 and 2020.
