= Spain men's national wheelchair basketball team =

Spain
- IWBF zone: Europe
- Coach: José Manuel Artacho

Paralympic Games
- Appearances: 4 (1992, 1996, 2012, 2016)
- Medals: Silver: 2016

World Championships
- Appearances: 3 (1994, 1998, 2014)

European WBC
- Medals: Gold: 2025; Silver: 1995, 2019; Bronze: 2011, 2013
Home	Away

Spain men's national wheelchair basketball team has represented Spain at the IWBF European Championships, IWBF World Championships and at the Paralympic Games. The team won a bronze at the 2013 European Championships. They finished fifth at the 2012 Summer Paralympics, and sixth at the 1992 Summer Paralympics. Spain also has a men's national under-22 team and under-23 team. The under-23 team finished second at the 2009 Paris European Championships.

== History ==
Since Óscar Trigo became head coach of the national team, there has been higher standards of player preparation, including formalizing training and nutrition. Trigo also made the role of national coach more important in player selection for the national squad.

The members of the men's and women's national team participated in the XVIII International Memorial Trophy Joan Palau Francàs in Barcelona in 2011.

=== European Championships ===
Spain competed at the 2009 European Championships in Turkey. They played in the 7th-8th place match against Israel. Spain won the game 73-65 following a 35–31 halftime lead. Alejos led Spain in scoring with 19 points. Spain had 3 wins and 2 losses in group play. The team played the Netherlands in the 2009 edition, winning 69–57. The team was coached by Óscar Trigo during the competition.

In 2011, the team competed at the Israel hosted International Wheelchair Basketball Federation (IWBF) European Championships. The competition was a Paralympic qualifying event, with a fifth place or better finish qualifying the team for the 2012 Summer Paralympics. The team played France, Germany, the Netherlands, Sweden and Poland in pool play. They lost to the Netherlands 69–47, to Germany 61–81, and to France 72–62. They beat Poland 47–64, and Sweden 65–54. Then they lost to Italy 50–58, lost to Germany 77–70, and defeated Poland 71–65.

At the 2013 European Championships, Spain defeated Sweden 60–54, Israel 75–57, France 56–40, and Poland 63–45 in pool play. They lost to Turkey 63–49. In the quarterfinals, they defeated Italy 65–56. In the semi-finals, they lost to Great Britain 72–69. They defeated Sweden to win the bronze by a score of 65–56. Asier García Pereiro led the team in scoring in the game against Sweden with 19 points, rebounds with 8 and had 4 assists. In doing so, the team secured a berth at the 2014 World Championships. Members of the team included Alejandro Zarzuela, Paul Zarzuela, Asier García Pereiro, Francisco Sánchez Lara, Jordi Ruiz, Francisco José Sánchez, Roberto Mena, Asier García, and David Mouriz. They were coached by Óscar Trigo.

=== World Championships ===
At the 1994 World Championships held in Edmonton, Canada, the team finished seventh. The team finished sixth at the 1998 World Championships in Sydney, Australia.

In the 2013 edition, Spain achieved the semifinals but finally was defeated by United States and by Turkey in the bronze medal game.

=== Paralympics ===
The team competed at the 1992 Summer Paralympics, where they finished seventh. They also competed at the 1996 Summer Paralympics.

==== 2012 Games ====
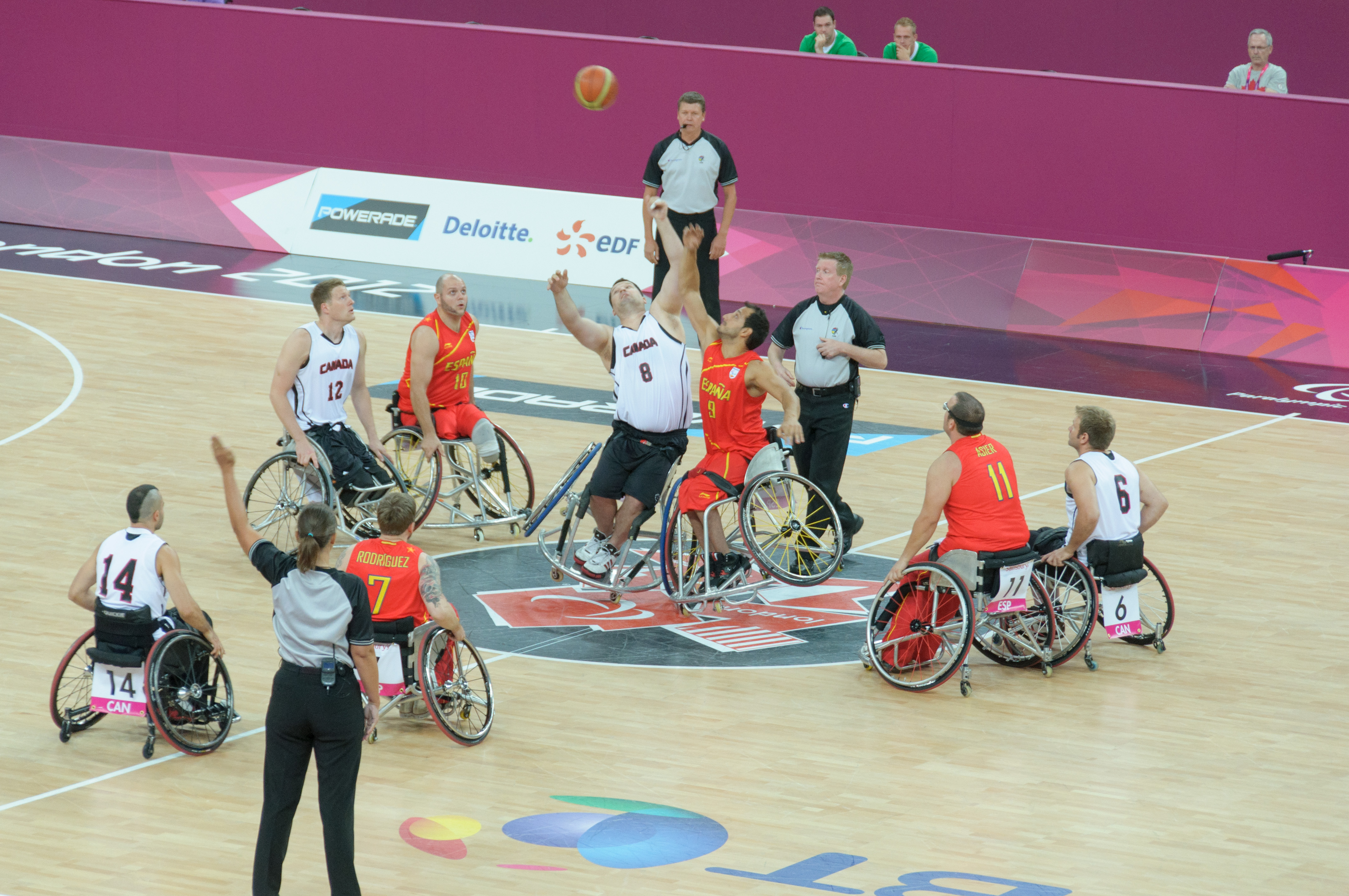
Spain against Canada at the 2012 Games

The team competed in wheelchair basketball at the 2012 Summer Paralympics in London. In London, the team was coached by Óscar Trigo. It was the first time the Spanish national team had qualified for the Paralympics in 16 years. The team finished fifth. This was the best finish the team had in their Paralympic history. While Alejandro Zarzuela was on the Paralympic roster, his twin brother Pablo Jesús Zarzuela was unable to play as a result of having an ulcer.

In pool play, they were grouped with Italy, South Africa, Australia, Turkey and the United States. After finishing the group stage in third position, Spain was defeated by Canada in the quarterfinals and finally finished in the fifth position.

==== 2016 Games ====
With José Manuel Artacho as head coach, Spain won the silver medal. In the first round, Spain led its group after winning four of its five games. In the knockout stage, the Spanish team came back in the last quarter to beat Germany in the quarterfinals and beat Great Britain to secure its first Paralympic medal ever. In the final game, Spain was defeated by the United States.

== Competitive record ==
=== Paralympic Games ===
Year	Position	Pld	W	L
(Spain) 1992	7th	8	3	5
(United States) 1996	4th	8	5	3
(United Kingdom) 2012	5th	8	5	3
(Brazil) 2016	2nd place, silver medalist(s)	8	6	2
(Japan) 2020	4th	8	6	2
(France) 2024	5th	4	2	2
Total		44	27	17

=== World Championship ===
Year	Position	Pld	W	L
(Canada) 1994	7th			
(Australia) 1998	6th			
(South Korea) 2014	4th	9	6	3
(Germany) 2018	5th	7	3	4
Total				

=== European Championship ===
Year	Position	Pld	W	L
(Spain) 1991				
(Germany) 1993				
(France) 1995	2nd place, silver medalist(s)			
(Spain) 1997	4th			
(Netherlands) 1999				
(Netherlands) 2001				
(Italy) 2003				
(France) 2005				
(Germany) 2007				
(Turkey) 2009				
(Israel) 2011	3rd place, bronze medalist(s)			
(Germany) 2013	3rd place, bronze medalist(s)	8	6	2
(United Kingdom) 2015	5th	6	3	3
(Spain) 2017	5th	7	5	2
(Poland) 2019	2nd place, silver medalist(s)	8	7	1
(Spain) 2021	7th	6	4	2
(Netherlands) 2023	2nd place, silver medalist(s)	8	5	3
Total				

== Youth teams ==
=== Under-22 team ===
Spain also has a men's national under-22 team. At the 2010 European Championships, Spain lost to Germany in pool play 11–65, France 40–32, and Italy 18–37. In the quarterfinals, they lost to Great Britain 66–12. In the semifinals, they lost to Italy 36–46. In the 7th-8th place match, they lost to France 62–30. They competed at the 2012 European Championships, where they lost to Turkey 91–23, lost to Sweden 77–25, and lost to France 52–46 in group play. Playing Germany in the quarterfinals, Spain lost 76–21. In the semifinals, they lost to Italy 68–35. In the 7th-8th place match, they lost to the Netherlands 37–32.

=== Under-23 team ===
The under-23 Spanish national team, won a pair European Championships in 2006 and 2008. They finished second at the 2009 Paris hosted European Championships.

== See also ==
- Spain men's national basketball team
