= Wheelchair basketball at the 1992 Summer Paralympics – Men's tournament =

Wheelchair basketball – Men at the IX Paralympic Games
- Paralympic Wheelchair Basketball
- Venue: Palau Municipal d'Esports de Badalona
- Dates: 1992

Medalists
1st place, gold medalist(s)		Netherlands; ~~United States~~ (DSQ)
2nd place, silver medalist(s)		Germany
3rd place, bronze medalist(s)		France

The men's tournament in wheelchair basketball at the 1992 Summer Paralympics was held in September 1992 in the newly built Palau Municipal d'Esports de Badalona with a capacity of 12,500 spectators.

The United States beat the Netherlands in the final by 39 to 36, but were disqualified as one of the US players tested positive for doping. The team of the Netherlands was declared the official winner of the tournament, while Germany ended in second place and France in third.

== Medal Round ==
Quarterfinals
France	49
Canada	48
United States	61
Australia	53
Netherlands	59
Spain	53
Great Britain	40
Germany	43

Semifinals
France	47
United States	71
Netherlands	61
Germany	32

Finals
United States	39
Netherlands	36
Third place
France	38
Germany	42

== Classification 5-8 ==
Classification round
Canada	62
Australia	48
Spain	54
Great Britain	55

Fifth place
Canada	60
Great Britain	45
Seventh place
Australia	59
Spain	63

== Classification 9-12 ==
Classification round
Sweden	47
Argentina	39
Japan	61
Israel	56

Ninth place
Sweden	50
Japan	51
Eleventh place
Argentina	42
Israel	47

== Ranking ==
Place	Team
1st place, gold medalist(s)	Netherlands; ~~United States~~ (DSQ)
2nd place, silver medalist(s)	Germany
3rd place, bronze medalist(s)	France
4.	Canada
5.	Great Britain
6.	Spain
7.	Australia
8.	Japan
9.	Sweden
10.	Israel
11.	Argentina
12.
