= Wheelchair basketball at the 2016 Summer Paralympics – Men's tournament =

Wheelchair basketball at the XV Paralympic Games
- Venue: Carioca Arena 1 Rio Olympic Arena
- Dates: 8 – 17 September 2016
- Competitors: 144

Medalists
1st place, gold medalist(s)		United States	United States
2nd place, silver medalist(s)		Spain	Spain
3rd place, bronze medalist(s)		Great Britain	Great Britain

The men's tournament in wheelchair basketball at the 2016 Summer Paralympics was held between the 8–17 September.

== Competition schedule ==
G	Group stage	¼	Quarter-finals	½	Semi-finals	B	Bronze medal match	GM	Gold medal match

Date Event	Thu 8 Sep	Fri 9 Sep	Sat 10 Sep	Sun 11 Sep	Mon 12 Sep	Tue 13 Sep	Wed 14 Sep	Thu 15 Sep	Fri 16 Sep	Sat 17 Sep	
Men	G	G	G	G	G		1/4	1/2		B	GM

== Group stage ==
=== Group A ===
Pos	Team	Pld	W	L	PF	PA	PD	Pts	Qualification
1	Spain	5	4	1	341	265	+76	9 (Note: Head-to-head record: Spain 3 pts, +8 PD; Turkey 3 pts, +1 PD; Japan 3 pts, −9 PD)	Quarter-finals
2	Turkey	5	4	1	327	272	+55	9	Quarter-finals
3	Australia	5	4	1	342	293	+49	9	Quarter-finals
4	Netherlands	5	2	3	264	294	−30	7	Quarter-finals
5	Japan	5	1	4	278	300	−22	6	9th/10th place playoff
6	Canada	5	0	5	222	350	−128	5	11th/12th place playoff

Source: Paralympic.org
Rules for classification: 1) Points; 2) Head-to-head results; 3) Points difference; 4) Points scored.
Notes:

8 September 2016
15:45

Report

Turkey	65–49	Japan
Scoring by quarter: 18–16, 13–9, 16–16, 18–8
Pts: Gürbulak 25; Rebs: Gümüş 11; Asts: Gürbulak 10		Pts: Fujimoto 22; Rebs: Fujimoto 8 Asts: Kozai 10

Carioca Arena 1, Rio de Janeiro
Referees: Cristian Roja

8 September 2016
18:00

Report

Netherlands	50–70	Australia
Scoring by quarter: 6–16, 19–21, 13–18, 12–15
Pts: Korkmaz 24; Rebs: Poggenwisch 9 Asts: Korkmaz, Poggenwish 8		Pts: Blair 23; Rebs: Knowles 12; Asts: Stibners 7

Rio Olympic Arena, Rio de Janeiro
Referees: Bill Kuerzi

8 September 2016
21:30

Report

Spain	80–46	Canada
Scoring by quarter: 20–11, 23–9, 22–14, 15–12
Pts: A. Zarzuela 22; Rebs: A. Zarzuela 10; Asts: García 7		Pts: Eng 12; Rebs: Hickey 4 Asts: Goncin 5

Carioca Arena 1, Rio de Janeiro
Referees: Carsten Rehling

9 September 2016
12:15

Report

Australia	62–60	Turkey
Scoring by quarter: 17–20, 17–13, 12–17, 16–10
Pts: Knowles 17; Rebs: Norris 11; Asts: Knowles 9		Pts: Gürbulak 27; Rebs: Gürbulak 13; Asts: Gürbulak 12

Carioca Arena 1, Rio de Janeiro
Referees: Carsten Rehling

9 September 2016
15:45

Report

Japan	39–55	Spain
Scoring by quarter: 11–8, 12–18, 4–16, 12–13
Pts: Kozai 11; Rebs: Fujimoto, Chiwaki 11; Asts: Kozai 8		Pts: Mouriz 20; Rebs: A. Zarzuela 10; Asts: Alejos 4

Carioca Arena 1, Rio de Janeiro
Referees: Bill Kuerzi

9 September 2016
18:00

Report

Canada	32–49	Netherlands
Scoring by quarter: 10–9, 9–6, 4–18, 9–16
Pts: Goncin 12; Rebs: Goncin 14; Asts: Goncin, Hedges 3		Pts: Korkmaz 20; Rebs: Groen 7 Asts: Poggenwisch 6

Carioca Arena 1, Rio de Janeiro
Referees: Mati Quintana

10 September 2016
10:30

Report

Spain	65–68	Turkey
Scoring by quarter: 20–21, 16–13, 14–15, 15–19
Pts: A. Zarzuela, P. Zarzuela 18; Rebs: A. Zarzuela 11; Asts: García 14		Pts: Gürbulak 39; Rebs: Gezinci, Gümüş 6 Asts: Gürbulak 8

Carioca Arena 1, Rio de Janeiro
Referees: Max Kindervater

10 September 2016
15:15

Report

Canada	53–78	Australia
Scoring by quarter: 16–21, 12–15, 16–22, 9–20
Pts: Eng 17; Rebs: Goncin, Eng 6 Asts: Goncin 5		Pts: Knowles 23; Rebs: Norris 7 Asts: Knowles 6

Rio Olympic Arena, Rio de Janeiro
Referees: Gustavo Mathias

10 September 2016
21:00

Report

Netherlands	67–39	Japan
Scoring by quarter: 22–10, 14–23, 16–16, 15–10
Pts: Korkmaz 33; Rebs: Poggenwisch, Bellers 6 Asts: Poggenwisch 8		Pts: Fujimoto 25; Rebs: Fujimoto 11; Asts: Kozai 11

Rio Olympic Arena, Rio de Janeiro
Referees: Jaime Oseguera

11 September 2016
08:30

Report

Spain	75–64	Australia
Scoring by quarter: 11–21, 24–12, 16–10, 24–21
Pts: A. Zarzuela, P. Zarzuela 17; Rebs: A. Zarzuela 13; Asts: García 11		Pts: Knowles 28; Rebs: Knowles 11; Asts: Norris 6

Rio Olympic Arena, Rio de Janeiro
Referees: Cristian Roja

11 September 2016
11:45

Report

Turkey	67–50	Netherlands
Scoring by quarter: 21–15, 16–8, 12–8, 18–10
Pts: Dalay, Gümüş 18; Rebs: Gümüş 7 Asts: Gürbulak 11		Pts: Korkmaz 12; Rebs: Poggenwisch 8 Asts: Poggenwisch 10

Carioca Arena 1, Rio de Janeiro
Referees: Bill Kuerzi

11 September 2016
21:00

Report

Japan	76–45	Canada
Scoring by quarter: 13–9, 22–15, 19–14, 22–7
Pts: Kozai 19; Rebs: Chiwaki 8 Asts: Kozai 7		Pts: Eng 18; Rebs: Goncin 7 Asts: Goncin 6

Rio Olympic Arena, Rio de Janeiro
Referees: Max Kindervater

12 September 2016
13:30

Report

Australia	68–55	Japan
Scoring by quarter: 14–7, 20–13, 15–10, 19–25
Pts: Ness 12; Rebs: Knowles 7 Asts: Knowles 9		Pts: Kozai 9 Rebs: Fujimoto 6 Asts: Mayajima 7

Carioca Arena 1, Rio de Janeiro
Referees: Bil Kuerzi

12 September 2016
17:15

Report

Netherlands	48–66	Spain
Scoring by quarter: 12–24, 9–23, 9–8, 18–11
Pts: Korkmaz 13; Rebs: Poggenwisch 8 Asts: Poggenwisch 4		Pts: A. Zarzuela 19; Rebs: three players 7 Asts: García 10

Rio Olympic Arena, Rio de Janeiro
Referees: Carsten Rehling

12 September 2016
19:30

Report

Canada	46–67	Turkey
Scoring by quarter: 9–14, 15–15, 13–22, 9–16
Pts: Eng 15; Rebs: Goncin 8 Asts: Goncin 7		Pts: Gürbulak 24; Rebs: Gezinci, Gümüş 7 Asts: Gürbulak 10

Rio Olympic Arena, Rio de Janeiro
Referees: Max Kindervater

=== Group B ===
Pos	Team	Pld	W	L	PF	PA	PD	Pts	Qualification
1	United States	5	5	0	402	206	+196	10	Quarter-finals
2	Great Britain	5	4	1	364	263	+101	9	Quarter-finals
3	Brazil (H)	5	2	3	309	314	−5	7 (Note: Head-to-head record: Brazil 3 pts, +11 PD; Germany 3 pts, +6 PD; Iran 3 pts, −17 PD)	Quarter-finals
4	Germany	5	2	3	337	314	+23	7	Quarter-finals
5	Iran	5	2	3	295	361	−66	7	9th/10th place playoff
6	Algeria	5	0	5	187	436	−249	5	11th/12th place playoff

Source: Paralympic.org
Rules for classification: 1) Points; 2) Head-to-head results; 3) Points difference; 4) Points scored.
(H) Hosts
Notes:

8 September 2016
11:45

Report

Great Britain	93–31	Algeria
Scoring by quarter: 23–10, 20–13, 20–6, 30–2
Pts: Sagar 19; Rebs: Sagar 11; Asts: Brown, Warburton 7		Pts: Ayache, Mansouri 8 Rebs: Abassi, Guedoun 5 Asts: Guedoun 5

Rio Olympic Arena, Rio de Janeiro
Referees: Mati Quintana

8 September 2016
15:15

Report

Brazil	38–75	United States
Scoring by quarter: 4–15, 12–24, 8–17, 14–19
Pts: Candido Sanchez 12; Rebs: De Miranda 13; Asts: de Miranda 5		Pts: Turek, Bell 15; Rebs: Turek, Serio 7 Asts: Serio 7

Rio Olympic Arena, Rio de Janeiro
Referees: Juan Uruneula

8 September 2016
18:00

Report

Germany	63–69	Iran
Scoring by quarter: 12–22, 14–14, 22–10, 15–23
Pts: Halouski 22; Rebs: Halouski 11		Pts: Ebrahimi 30; Rebs: Abedi 11; Asts: Ebrahimi 5

Carioca Arena 1, Rio de Janeiro
Referees: Sebastian Gauthier

9 September 2016
09:30

Report

United States	77–52	Germany
Scoring by quarter: 15–11, 24–15, 21–10, 17–15
Pts: Scott 15; Rebs: Serio 6 Asts: Paye, Serio 6		Pts: Bohme 26; Rebs: Halouski 8 Asts: Bienek 5

Rio Olympic Arena, Rio de Janeiro
Referees: Matt Wells

9 September 2016
11:45

Report

Iran	60–84	Great Britain
Scoring by quarter: 13–21, 21–25, 9–19, 17–19
Pts: Gholamazad 20; Rebs: Gholamazad 7 Asts: Gholamazad, Ebrahami 4		Pts: Pratt, Sagar 21; Rebs: Brown, Sagar 7 Asts: Pratt 11

Rio Olympic Arena, Rio de Janeiro
Referees: Juan Urunuela

9 September 2016
21:00

Report

Algeria	43–82	Brazil
Scoring by quarter: 16–21, 10–18, 4–23, 13–20
Pts: Guedoun 24; Rebs: Guedoun 12; Asts: Mansouri 5		Pts: Candido Sanchez 24; Rebs: Candido Sanchez, De Miranda 9 Asts: Candido Sanchez 7

Rio Olympic Arena, Rio de Janeiro
Referees: Nurredin Bilmez

10 September 2016
17:30

Report

United States	93–44	Iran
Scoring by quarter: 23–12, 21–10, 27–5, 22–17
Pts: Scott 15; Rebs: Serio 6 Asts: Serio 12		Pts: Ebrahim 11; Rebs: Ghoulamazad 5 Asts: Ghoulamazad 4

Rio Olympic Arena, Rio de Janeiro
Referees: Philip Haines

10 September 2016
18:00

Report

Germany	97–41	Algeria
Scoring by quarter: 22–14, 32–3, 33–16, 20–8
Pts: Bohme 29; Rebs: Bienek 8 Asts: Bienek 11		Pts: Guedoun 22; Rebs: Guedoun 8 Asts: Guedoun 6

Carioca Arena 1, Rio de Janeiro
Referees: Alexandre Lapointe

10 September 2016
21:00

Report[

Great Britain	73–55	Brazil
Scoring by quarter: 15–12, 20–15, 18–16, 20–12
Pts: Choudhry 18; Rebs: Choudhry 10; Asts: Choudhry 9		Pts: Candido Sanchez 9 Rebs: De Miranda 15; Asts: De Miranda, Da Silva 3

Carioca Arena 1, Rio de Janeiro
Referees: Matt Wells

11 September 2016
12:15

Report

Great Britain	66–52	Germany
Scoring by quarter: 12–12, 19–12, 18–15, 17–13
Pts: Sagar 21; Rebs: Choudhry 7 Asts: Sagar, Choudhry 4		Pts: Passiwan 18; Rebs: Bohme 10; Asts: Passiwan 5

Carioca Arena 1, Rio de Janeiro
Referees: Toma Pajer

11 September 2016
15:15

Report

Brazil	73–50	Iran
Scoring by quarter: 13–10, 26–9, 19–13, 15–18
Pts: Candido Sanchez 25; Rebs: De Miranda, Candido Sanchex, Da Sila 4 Asts: Candido Sanchez 12		Pts: Ebrahim 13; Rebs: Ebrahim 6 Asts: four players 2

Rio Olympic Arena, Rio de Janeiro
Referees: Akexandre Lapointe

11 September 2016
18:00

Report

Algeria	24–92	United States
Scoring by quarter: 4–27, 6–22, 2–24, 12–19
Pts: Guedoun 10; Rebs: Abassi 4 Asts: Guedoun 5		Pts: Williams 17; Rebs: Jennifer 5 Asts: Serio 9

Carioca Arena 1, Rio de Janeiro
Referees: Mati Quintana

12 September 2016
14:00

Report

Iran	72–48	Algeria
Scoring by quarter: 24–14, 19–13, 13–12, 16–9
Pts: Abedi 23; Rebs: Gholamazad 12; Asts: Hadiazhar 7		Pts: Guedoun 16; Rebs: Ayache 5 Asts: Guedoun 9

Rio Olympic Arena, Rio de Janeiro
Referees: Krunoslav Peic

12 September 2016
15:45

Report

United States	65–48	Great Britain
Scoring by quarter: 13–12, 18–10, 11–15, 23–11
Pts: Williams 12; Rebs: Serio 5 Asts: Serio 8		Pts: Choudrhy 17; Rebs: Choudrhy 9 Asts: Choudrhy 7

Carioca Arena 1, Rio de Janeiro
Referees: Sebastien Gauthier

12 September 2016
21:45

Report

Brazil	61–73	Germany
Scoring by quarter: 8–15, 19–18, 18–21, 16–19
Pts: Da Silva 21; Rebs: De Miranda 12; Asts: Dos Santos 7		Pts: Bohme 26; Rebs: Bohme 13; Asts: Bohme 7

Rio Olympic Arena, Rio de Janeiro
Referees: Philip Haines

== Knockout stage ==
Quarterfinals
14 September
Spain	70
Germany	66
14 September
Great Britain	74
Australia	51
14 September
Turkey	65
Brazil	49
14 September
United States	70
Netherlands	37

Semifinals
15 September
Spain	69
Great Britain	63
15 September
Turkey	54
United States	74

Gold medal
17 September
Spain	52
United States	68
Bronze medal
17 September
Great Britain	82
Turkey	76

=== Classification playoffs ===
==== 11th/12th place playoff ====
14 September 2016
19:30

Report

Canada	70–51	Algeria
Scoring by quarter: 13–5, 17–17, 20–15, 20–14
Pts: Goncin 19; Rebs: Miller 7 Asts: Hedges 6		Pts: Guedoun 22; Rebs: Guedoun 8 Asts: Guedoun 8

Rio Olympic Arena, Rio de Janeiro
Referees: Philip Haines

==== 9th/10th place playoff ====
15 September 2016
9:30

Report

Japan	65–52	Iran
Scoring by quarter: 21–14, 14–16, 13–8, 17–14
Pts: Fujimoto 20; Rebs: Chiwaki 8 Asts: Kozai 14		Pts: Gholamazad 17; Rebs: Gholamazad 10; Asts: Gholamazad 5

Rio Olympic Arena, Rio de Janeiro
Referees: Jaime Oseguera

==== 7th/8th place playoff ====
17 September 2016
9:30

Report

Germany	50–61	Netherlands
Scoring by quarter: 15–11, 13–21, 11–17, 11–12
Pts: Bienek 17; Rebs: Halousski 10; Asts: Bienek 7		Pts: Bellers, Kormaz 19; Rebs: Groen 15; Asts: Poggenwisch 15

Rio Olympic Arena, Rio de Janeiro
Referees: Gustavo Mathias

==== 5th/6th place playoff ====
17 September 2016
15:15

Report

Australia	69–70	Brazil
Scoring by quarter: 20–17, 19–20, 13–17, 17–16
Pts: Knowles 15; Rebs: Norris 5 Asts: Norris 5		Pts: De Miranda 24; Rebs: De Miranda 15; Asts: Candido Sanchez 16

Rio Olympic Arena, Rio de Janeiro
Referees: Max Kindervater

=== Quarter-finals ===
14 September 2016
11:45

Report

Spain	70–66	Germany
Scoring by quarter: 19–21, 15–19, 14–13, 22–13
Pts: A. Zarzuela, García 22; Rebs: A. Zarzuela 18; Asts: García 13		Pts: Halouski 21; Rebs: Halouski 15; Asts: Bienek 8

Rio Olympic Arena, Rio de Janeiro
Referees: Bill Kuerzi

14 September 2016
15:15

Report

United States	70–37	Netherlands
Scoring by quarter: 12–18, 15–2, 24–4, 19–13
Pts: Serio 18; Rebs: Turek 9 Asts: Serio 11		Pts: Korkmaz 17; Rebs: Poggenwisch 9 Asts: Peggenwisch 3

Rio Olympic Arena, Rio de Janeiro
Referees: Juan Urunuela

14 September 2016
17:30

Report

Great Britain	74–51	Australia
Scoring by quarter: 11–15, 18–16, 23–14, 22–6
Pts: Sagar 26; Rebs: Sagar, Pratt 10; Asts: Choudhry 10		Pts: Norris 14; Rebs: Knowles 7 Asts: Norris 8

Rio Olympic Arena, Rio de Janeiro
Referees: Cristian Roja

14 September 2016
21:00

Report

Turkey	65–49	Brazil
Scoring by quarter: 19–8, 20–12, 14–14, 12–15
Pts: Gürbulak 17; Rebs: Gümüş 10; Asts: Gürbulak 11		Pts: Candido Sanchez 18; Rebs: De Miranda 9 Asts: Candido Sanchez 4

Rio Olympic Arena, Rio de Janeiro
Referees: Sabastien Gauthier

=== Semi-finals ===
15 September 2016
17:30

Report

Spain	69–63	Great Britain
Scoring by quarter: 12–14, 23–14, 12–15, 20–20
Pts: García, A. Zarzuela 19; Rebs: García 13; Asts: García 13		Pts: Sagar 18; Rebs: Choudrhy 8 Asts: Pratt 8

Rio Olympic Arena, Rio de Janeiro
Referees: Sebastien Gauthier

15 September 2016
21:00

Report

Turkey	54–74	United States
Scoring by quarter: 19–20, 8–17, 9–17, 18–20
Pts: Gürbulak 13; Rebs: Gürbulak 10; Asts: Gürbulak 11		Pts: Serio 17; Rebs: Serio 7 Asts: Serio 9

Rio Olympic Arena, Rio de Janeiro
Referees: Linas Radykas

=== Bronze medal match ===
17 September 2016
11:45

Report

Great Britain	82–76 (OT)	Turkey
Scoring by quarter: 16–22, 13–8, 14–19, 22–16, Overtime: 17–11
Pts: Bywater 25; Rebs: Sagar 11; Asts: Pratt 12		Pts: Gürbulak 24; Rebs: Gürbulak 10; Asts: Gürbulak 19

Rio Olympic Arena, Rio de Janeiro
Referees: Krunoslav Peic

=== Gold medal match ===
17 September 2016
17:30

Report

Spain	52–68	United States
Scoring by quarter: 8-12, 15-17, 19-18, 10-21
Pts: A. Zarzuela 20; Rebs: García 10; Asts: García 16		Pts: Williams 20; Rebs: Serio 8 Asts: Serio 10

Rio Olympic Arena, Rio de Janeiro
Referees: Mat Wells

== Ranking ==
Place	Team
1st place, gold medalist(s)	United States
2nd place, silver medalist(s)	Spain
3rd place, bronze medalist(s)	Great Britain
4.	Turkey
5.	Brazil
6.	Australia
7.	Netherlands
8.	Germany
9.	Japan
10.	Iran
11.	Canada
12.	Algeria

== See also ==
- Wheelchair basketball at the 2016 Summer Paralympics – Women
