= 2023 IWBF Men's European Championship =

International wheelchair basketball competition

- Venue: Rotterdam Ahoy
- Location: Rotterdam, Netherlands
- Start date: 11 August
- End date: 19 August
- Competitors: 12 teams from 12 nations

Medalists
gold medal	Great Britain
silver medal	Spain
bronze medal	Netherlands

The 2023 IWBF Men's European Championship was the 26th edition of the European Wheelchair Basketball Championship. It took place from 11 to 19 August 2023 in Rotterdam, Netherlands.

The tournament was part of the first edition of the European Para Championships, a quadrennial multi-sport event that takes place each pre-Paralympic year. The finalists of this tournament qualified for the 2024 Summer Paralympics in Paris.

== Format ==
The twelve teams that qualified for the tournament are divided into two groups of six. The top four teams of each group advance to the knockout stage.

Each team has a squad of twelve players for the tournament. Players are given an eight-level-score specific to wheelchair basketball, ranging from 1 to 4.5. Lower scores represent a higher degree of disability. The sum score of all players on the court cannot exceed 14.

== Preliminary round ==
All times local (UTC+02:00)

=== Group A ===
Pos	Team	Pld	W	L	PF	PA	PD	Pts	Qualification
1	Netherlands	5	5	0	323	233	+90	10	Quarter-finals
2	Germany	5	3	2	350	243	+107	8	Quarter-finals
3	Spain	5	3	2	351	238	+113	8	Quarter-finals
4	Poland	5	3	2	367	349	+18	8	Quarter-finals
5	Switzerland	5	1	4	233	338	−105	6	Placement games
6	Latvia	5	0	5	187	410	−223	5	Placement games

Source: IWBF
Rules for classification: 1) Wins; 2) Head-to-head results; 3) Points difference; 4) Points scored.

11 August
12:30

Report

Poland	64–88	Spain
Scoring by quarter: 16–22, 17–23, 16–19, 15–24

Rotterdam Ahoy
Rotterdam

11 August
15:00

Report

Germany	64–40	Switzerland
Scoring by quarter: 22–15, 12–10, 10–6, 20–9

Rotterdam Ahoy
Rotterdam

11 August
20:00

Report

Netherlands	70–37	Latvia
Scoring by quarter: 17–9, 14–5, 21–14, 18–9

Rotterdam Ahoy
Rotterdam

12 August
9:00

Report

Latvia	18–102	Germany
Scoring by quarter: 5–25, 2–28, 4–26, 7–23

Rotterdam Ahoy
Rotterdam

12 August
11:30

Report

Spain	52–58	Netherlands
Scoring by quarter: 6–14, 13–15, 11–17, 22–12

Rotterdam Ahoy
Rotterdam

12 August
19:00

Report

Switzerland	62–71	Poland
Scoring by quarter: 17–16, 10–16, 21–16, 14–23

Rotterdam Ahoy
Rotterdam

13 August
12:30

Report

Netherlands	63–31	Switzerland
Scoring by quarter: 22–6, 13–9, 22–6, 6–10

Rotterdam Ahoy
Rotterdam

13 August
15:00

Report

Poland	86–84	Germany
Scoring by quarter: 19–15, 27–24, 21–21, 19–24

Rotterdam Ahoy
Rotterdam

13 August
17:30

Report

Spain	86–35	Latvia
Scoring by quarter: 23–10, 21–6, 23–10, 19–9

Rotterdam Ahoy
Rotterdam

14 August
9:00

Report

Poland	85–42	Latvia
Scoring by quarter: 25–13, 20–7, 27–8, 13–14

Rotterdam Ahoy
Rotterdam

14 August
11:30

Report

Switzerland	31–84	Spain
Scoring by quarter: 0–23, 12–19, 4–23, 15–19

Rotterdam Ahoy
Rotterdam

14 August
19:00

Report

Germany	29–65	Netherlands
Scoring by quarter: 12–20, 6–21, 12–11, 9–13

Rotterdam Ahoy
Rotterdam

15 August
12:30

Report

Latvia	55–67	Switzerland
Scoring by quarter: 18–16, 13–13, 14–19, 10–19

Rotterdam Ahoy
Rotterdam

15 August
15:00

Report

Netherlands	73–61	Poland
Scoring by quarter: 16–14, 19–16, 15–20, 23–11

Rotterdam Ahoy
Rotterdam

15 August
17:30

Report

Spain	41–50	Germany
Scoring by quarter: 17–21, 10–16, 14–13, 0–0

Rotterdam Ahoy
Rotterdam

=== Group B ===
Pos	Team	Pld	W	L	PF	PA	PD	Pts	Qualification
1	Great Britain	5	5	0	379	252	+127	10	Quarter-finals
2	Turkey	5	4	1	348	284	+64	9	Quarter-finals
3	Italy	5	3	2	333	276	+57	8	Quarter-finals
4	France	5	2	3	340	323	+17	7	Quarter-finals
5	Austria	5	1	4	265	398	−133	6	Placement games
6	Israel	5	0	5	241	373	−132	5	Placement games

Source: IWBF
Rules for classification: 1) Wins; 2) Head-to-head results; 3) Points difference; 4) Points scored.

11 August
11:30

Report

France	77–64	Austria
Scoring by quarter: 19–16, 17–15, 21–17, 20–16

Rotterdam Ahoy
Rotterdam

11 August
16:30

Report

Italy	62–50	Israel
Scoring by quarter: 10–18, 20–12, 13–7, 19–13

Rotterdam Ahoy
Rotterdam

11 August
19:00

Report

Great Britain	58–44	Turkey
Scoring by quarter: 14–8, 12–8, 18–17, 14–11

Rotterdam Ahoy
Rotterdam

12 August
12:30

Report

Turkey	67–63	Italy
Scoring by quarter: 9–14, 22–21, 14–17, 22–11

Rotterdam Ahoy
Rotterdam

12 August
15:00

Report

Austria	50–100	Great Britain
Scoring by quarter: 12–21, 14–34, 14–21, 10–24

Rotterdam Ahoy
Rotterdam

12 August
20:00

Report

Israel	44–86	France
Scoring by quarter: 13–18, 13–20, 9–25, 9–23

Rotterdam Ahoy
Rotterdam

13 August
9:00

Report

Austria	55–83	Turkey
Scoring by quarter: 13–24, 14–18, 14–14, 14–27

Rotterdam Ahoy
Rotterdam

13 August
16:30

Report

France	59–69	Italy
Scoring by quarter: 12–17, 15–20, 17–18, 15–14

Rotterdam Ahoy
Rotterdam

13 August
19:00

Report

Great Britain	84–49	Israel
Scoring by quarter: 21–12, 18–13, 23–17, 22–7

Rotterdam Ahoy
Rotterdam

14 August
10:00

Report

France	65–79	Turkey
Scoring by quarter: 17–23, 17–13, 12–27, 19–16

Rotterdam Ahoy
Rotterdam

14 August
17:30

Report

Israel	55–66	Austria
Scoring by quarter: 20–12, 7–14, 12–12, 16–28

Rotterdam Ahoy
Rotterdam

14 August
20:00

Report

Italy	56–70	Great Britain
Scoring by quarter: 20–22, 10–18, 16–20, 10–10

Rotterdam Ahoy
Rotterdam

15 August
11:30

Report

Austria	30–83	Italy
Scoring by quarter: 13–23, 12–17, 1–27, 4–16

Rotterdam Ahoy
Rotterdam

15 August
16:30

Report

Turkey	75–43	Israel
Scoring by quarter: 24–10, 19–13, 16–12, 16–8

Rotterdam Ahoy
Rotterdam

15 August
19:00

Report

Great Britain	67–53	France
Scoring by quarter: 18–18, 20–12, 16–12, 13–11

Rotterdam Ahoy
Rotterdam

== Knockout stage ==
Championship bracket

Quarter-finals
16 August
Netherlands	63
France	60
16 August
Turkey	66
Spain	73
16 August
Great Britain	94
Poland	75
16 August
Germany	69
Italy	63

Semi-finals
17 August
Netherlands	57
Spain	76
17 August
Great Britain	63
Germany	42

Final
19 August
Spain	53
Great Britain	74
Third place
19 August
Netherlands	58
Germany	51

=== Placement games ===
==== Ninth to twelfth place ====
Bracket

9th–12th placement games
16 August
Israel	63
Switzerland	45
16 August
Austria	82
Latvia	57

9th place
18 August
Israel	70
Austria	63
11th place
18 August
Switzerland	66
Latvia	46

Ninth to twelfth place games

16 August
9:00

Report

Israel	63–45	Switzerland
Scoring by quarter: 12–11, 18–16, 16–7, 17–11

Rotterdam Ahoy
Rotterdam

16 August
10:00

Report

Austria	82–57	Latvia
Scoring by quarter: 20–11, 20–14, 22–19, 20–13

Rotterdam Ahoy
Rotterdam

Eleventh place game

18 August
10:00

Report

Switzerland	66–46	Latvia
Scoring by quarter: 24–10, 16–10, 14–17, 12–9

Rotterdam Ahoy
Rotterdam

Ninth place game

18 August
12:30

Report

Israel	70–63	Austria
Scoring by quarter: 14–21, 21–18, 12–17, 23–7

Rotterdam Ahoy
Rotterdam

==== Fifth to eighth place ====
Bracket

5th–8th placement games
17 August
France	76
Turkey	82
17 August
Poland	59
Italy	75

5th place
19 August
Turkey	66
Italy	70
7th place
19 August
France	80
Poland	67

Fifth to eighth place games

17 August
12:30

Report

Turkey	82–76	France
Scoring by quarter: 19–19, 16–14, 20–22, 27–21

Rotterdam Ahoy
Rotterdam

17 August
15:00

Report

Poland	59–75	Italy
Scoring by quarter: 17–20, 16–28, 17–23, 9–4

Rotterdam Ahoy
Rotterdam

Seventh place game

19 August
10:00

Report

France	80–67	Poland
Scoring by quarter: 17–16, 18–17, 26–20, 19–14

Rotterdam Ahoy
Rotterdam

Fifth place game

19 August
12:30

Report

Turkey	66–70	Italy
Scoring by quarter: 16–14, 21–21, 13–17, 16–18

Rotterdam Ahoy
Rotterdam

=== Quarter-finals ===
16 August
11:30

Report

Italy	63–69	Germany
Scoring by quarter: 23–13, 19–22, 11–18, 10–16

Rotterdam Ahoy
Rotterdam

16 August
12:30

Report

Spain	73–66	Turkey
Scoring by quarter: 18–14, 18–16, 16–15, 21–21

Rotterdam Ahoy
Rotterdam

16 August
15:00

Report

Great Britain	94–75	Poland
Scoring by quarter: 22–15, 23–25, 26–17, 23–18

Rotterdam Ahoy
Rotterdam

16 August
16:30

Report

France	60–63	Netherlands
Scoring by quarter: 18–17, 19–10, 11–19, 12–17

Rotterdam Ahoy
Rotterdam

=== Semi-finals ===
17 August
17:30

Report

Great Britain	63–42	Germany
Scoring by quarter: 21–15, 10–10, 16–8, 16–8

Rotterdam Ahoy
Rotterdam

17 August
20:00

Report

Netherlands	57–76	Spain
Scoring by quarter: 12–17, 17–19, 17–12, 11–28

Rotterdam Ahoy
Rotterdam

=== Third place game ===
19 August
15:00

Report

Netherlands	58–51	Germany
Scoring by quarter: 15–15, 20–9, 10–8, 13–19

Rotterdam Ahoy
Rotterdam

=== Final ===
19 August
17:30

Report

Spain	53–74	Great Britain
Scoring by quarter: 22–18, 12–23, 13–15, 6–18

Rotterdam Ahoy
Rotterdam

== Final standings ==
Rank	Team
1	Great Britain
2	Spain
3	Netherlands
4	Germany
5	Italy
6	Turkey
7	France
8	Poland
9	Israel
10	Austria
11	Switzerland
12	Latvia

== See also ==
- 2023 IWBF Women's European Championship
