= 2013 IWBF Men's European Championship =

- Location: Frankfurt, Germany
- Start date: 27 June
- End date: 8 July
- Competitors: 12 teams from 12 nations

Medalists
gold medal	Great Britain
silver medal	Turkey
bronze medal	Spain

The 2013 IWBF Men's European Championship was the 21st edition of the European Wheelchair Basketball Championship held in Frankfurt, Germany from 27 June to 8 July 2013.

Nations ranked 1 to 7 are qualified for participation at the 2014 World Championship in Incheon, South Korea.

== Squads ==
Each of the 12 teams selected a squad of 12 players for the tournament.

Athletes are given an eight-level-score specific to wheelchair basketball, ranging from 0.5 to 4.5. Lower scores represent a higher degree of disability The sum score of all players on the court cannot exceed 14.

== Preliminary round ==
All times local (UTC+02:00)

=== Group A ===
Team̹̹	Pld	W	L	PF	PA	PD	Pts
Great Britain	5	5	0	381	297	+84	10
Netherlands	5	3	2	311	277	+34	8
Italy	5	3	2	339	311	+28	8
Germany	5	2	3	305	297	+8	7
Switzerland	5	1	4	267	363	-96	6
Belgium	5	1	4	298	356	-58	6

28 June
20:15

Germany	51–74	Great Britain

29 June
14:30

Switzerland	44–70	Netherlands

29 June
19:00

Italy	73–56	Belgium

30 June
10:00

Great Britain	75–53	Switzerland

30 June
12:15

Netherlands	59–58	Italy

30 June
19:00

Belgium	52–72	Germany

1 July
14:30

Belgium	59–81	Great Britain

1 July
16:45

Italy	68–57	Switzerland

1 July
19:00

Germany	47–67	Netherlands

2 July
10:00

Italy	75–83	Great Britain

2 July
12:15

Switzerland	39–79	Germany

2 July
14:30

Netherlands	56–60	Belgium

3 July
14:15

Germany	56–65	Italy

3 July
16:45

Great Britain	68–59	Netherlands

3 July
19:00

Belgium	71–74	Switzerland

=== Group B ===
Team	Pld	W	L	PF	PA	PD	Pts
Turkey	5	5	0	379	282	+97	10
Spain	5	4	1	303	259	+44	9
Sweden	5	2	3	322	323	-1	7
Poland	5	2	3	315	363	-48	7
France	5	1	4	282	305	-23	6
Israel	5	1	4	287	356	-69	6

29 June
12:45

Spain	60–54	Sweden

29 June
15:00

Poland	73–70	France

29 June
19:00

Turkey	88–57	Israel

30 June
10:30

Sweden	81–69	Poland

30 June
12:45

France	59–66	Turkey

30 June
19:00

Israel	57–75	Spain

1 July
15:00

Turkey	92–59	Poland

1 July
17:15

Spain	56–40	France

1 July
19:00

Israel	69–66	Sweden

2 July
10:30

Poland	45–63	Spain

2 July
12:45

France	58–47	Israel

2 July
15:00

Turkey	70–58	Sweden

3 July
14:45

Spain	49–63	Turkey

3 July
17:15

Israel	57–69	Poland

3 July
19:30

Sweden	63–55	France

== Knockout stage ==
5 July
9:30

Switzerland	67–48	Israel

5 July
10:00

Belgium	70–86	France

Quarter-finals
5 July 2013
Italy	56
Spain	65
5 July 2013
Great Britain	89
Poland	56
5 July 2013
Turkey	89
Germany	79
5 July 2013
Sweden	63
Netherlands	45

Semi-finals
6 July 2013
Spain	69
Great Britain	72
6 July 2013
Turkey	79
Sweden	45

Final
7 July 2013
Great Britain	59
Turkey	57
Third place
7 July 2013
Sweden	56
Spain	65

=== Quarterfinals ===
5 July
14:00

Sweden	63–45	Netherlands

5 July
14:30

Italy	56–65	Spain

5 July
18:30

Turkey	89–79	Germany

5 July
19:00

Great Britain	89–56	Poland

=== Semifinals ===
6 July
12:30

Poland	53–72	Italy

6 July
13:00

Spain	69–72	Great Britain

6 July
17:45

Turkey	79–45	Sweden

6 July
17:45

Netherlands	59–69	Germany

11th place game

6 July
19:30

Israel	46–65	Belgium

9th place game

6 July
20:00

France	86–56	Switzerland

7th place game

7 July
11:15

Netherlands	76–65	Poland

5th place game

7 July
11:15

Germany	41–53	Italy

=== Bronze medal game ===
7 July
13:30

Sweden	56–65	Spain

=== Final ===
7 July
16:00

Great Britain	59–57	Turkey

== Final standings ==
Rank	Team
1	Great Britain
2	Turkey
3	Spain
4	Sweden
5	Italy
6	Germany
7	Netherlands
8	Poland
9	France
10	Switzerland
11	Belgium
12	Israel

2013 IWBF Men's European Championship

Great Britain
5th title

== Awards ==
All-Star Team
Point	Player	Shirt #	Nation
1	Abdillah Jama	10	Great Britain
2.5	Joackim Linden	15	Sweden
3	Alejandro Zarzuela Beltran	9	Spain
3	Mustafa Korkmaz	13	Netherlands
4	Özgür Gürbulak	5	Turkey
