= Wheelchair basketball at the 1996 Summer Paralympics – Men's tournament =

Wheelchair basketball – Men at the X Paralympic Games
- Paralympic Wheelchair Basketball
- Venue: Forbes Arena and Omni Coliseum
- Dates: 16 to 25 August 1996
- Competitors: 144 from 12 nations

Medalists
1st place, gold medalist(s)		Australia (AUS)
2nd place, silver medalist(s)		Great Britain (GBR)
3rd place, bronze medalist(s)		United States (USA)

The men's tournament was won by the team representing Australia.

== Preliminary round ==
Group A
Rank	Team	Pld	W	L	PF:PA	Pts	ESP	AUS	GBR	CAN	MEX	ARG
1	Spain	5	4	1	315:269	9	x	69:56	54:47	53:62	76:60	63:44
2	Australia	5	4	1	306:250	9	56:69	x	63:55	52:42	65:47	70:37
3	Great Britain	5	3	2	303:250	8	47:54	55:63	x	56:51	52:46	93:36
4	Canada	5	3	2	279:229	8	62:53	42:52	51:56	x	52:44	72:24
5	Mexico	5	1	4	244:287	6	60:76	47:65	46:52	44:52	x	47:42
6	Argentina	5	0	5	183:345	5	44:63	37:70	36:93	24:72	42:47	x

Group B
Rank	Team	Pld	W	L	PF:PA	Pts	USA	FRA	NED	JPN	SWE	IRQ
1	United States	4	4	0	297:166	8	x	72:43	53:42	80:32	92:49	DNS
2	France	4	3	1	207:211	7	43:72	x	46:41	61:47	57:51	DNS
3	Netherlands	4	2	2	213:185	6	42:53	41:46	x	72:42	58:44	DNS
4	Japan	4	1	3	173:260	5	32:80	47:61	42:72	x	52:47	DNS
5	Sweden	4	0	4	191:259	4	49:92	51:57	44:58	47:52	x	DNS
6	Iraq	0	0	0	0:0	0	DNS	DNS	DNS	DNS	DNS	x

Qualified for quarterfinals
Eliminated
Did not start

Source: Paralympic.org

== Medal round ==
Quarterfinals
Spain	61
Japan	48
France	50
Great Britain	53
United States	61
Canada	49
Australia	46
Netherlands	44

Semifinals
Spain	44
Great Britain	50
United States	57
Australia	63

Finals
Great Britain	63
Australia	78
Third place
Spain	60
United States	66

Source: Paralympic.org

== Classification 5-8 ==
Classification round
Japan	50
France	61
Canada	52
Netherlands	44

Fifth place
France	68
Canada	69
Third place
Japan	49
Netherlands	73

Source: Paralympic.org

== Classification 9-12 ==
Classification round
Mexico
Iraq	DNS
Sweden	52
Argentina	45

Ninth place
Mexico	49
Sweden	64
Third place
Iraq	DNS
Argentina

Source: Paralympic.org

== Ranking ==
Place	Team
1st place, gold medalist(s)	Australia
2nd place, silver medalist(s)	Great Britain
3rd place, bronze medalist(s)	United States
4	Spain
5	Canada
6	France
7	Netherlands
8	Japan
9	Sweden
10	Mexico
11	Argentina
12	Iraq
