= 2015 IWBF Men's European Championship =

- Location: Worcester, England
- Start date: 28 August
- End date: 6 September
- Competitors: 12 teams from 12 nations

Medalists
gold medal	Great Britain
silver medal	Turkey
bronze medal	Germany

The 2015 IWBF Men's European Championship was the 22nd edition of the European Wheelchair Basketball Championship held in Worcester, Great Britain from 28 August to 6 September 2015. The tournament also took place during the women's European championship as well.

Twelve teams entered the tournament with the Czech Republic and Israel competing in the tournament after being promoted from Division B in 2014. The teams were separated into two groups of six with the top four teams from each group qualifying through to the knockout stage while the bottom two competed to stay off relegation. The remaining eight teams competed in a knockout format until the top two teams made the final.

In the gold medal match, Great Britain won the match 87-66 over Turkey. While in the bronze medal match, Germany defeated the Netherlands 74-56. The top four teams plus Spain all qualified through to the 2016 Summer Paralympics in Rio de Janeiro, Brazil.

== Squads ==
Each of the 12 teams selected a squad of 12 players for the tournament.

Athletes are given an eight-level-score specific to wheelchair basketball, ranging from 0.5 to 4.5. Lower scores represent a higher degree of disability The sum score of all players on the court cannot exceed 14.

== Preliminary round ==
All times local (UTC+02:00)

=== Group A ===
Team̹̹	Pld	W	L	PF	PA	PD	Pts
Germany	5	5	0	404	269	+135	10
Poland	5	3	2	408	359	+49	8
Great Britain	5	3	2	370	320	+50	8
Spain	5	3	2	335	328	+7	8
France	5	1	4	294	381	-87	6
Czech Republic	5	0	5	236	400	-134	5

=== Group B ===
Team̹̹	Pld	W	L	PF	PA	PD	Pts
Turkey	5	5	0	329	262	+67	10
Italy	5	3	2	312	286	+26	8
Netherlands	5	3	2	316	260	+56	8
Israel	5	2	3	295	342	-47	7
Sweden	5	2	3	310	294	+16	7
Switzerland	5	0	5	255	373	-118	5

== Knockout stage ==
Quarter-finals
3 September 2015
Germany	75
Israel	54
3 September 2015
Great Britain	77
Italy	48
3 September 2015
Turkey	63
Spain	54
3 September 2015
Netherlands	63
Poland	56

Semi-finals
4 September 2015
Germany	68
Great Britain	77
4 September 2015
Turkey	69
Netherlands	50

Final
6 September 2015
Great Britain	87
Turkey	66
Third place
6 September 2015
Germany	74
Netherlands	56

== Final standings ==
Rank	Team
1	Great Britain
2	Turkey
3	Germany
4	Netherlands
5	Spain
6	Italy
7	Poland
8	Israel
9	Sweden
10	Switzerland
11	France
12	Czech Republic

2015 IWBF Men's European Championship

Great Britain
6th title
