= 2021 IWBF Men's European Championship =

International wheelchair basketball competition

- Venue: Centro Deportivo Municipal Francisco Fernández Ochoa
- Location: Madrid, Spain
- Start date: 4 December
- End date: 12 December
- Competitors: 12 teams from 12 nations

Medalists
gold medal	Netherlands
silver medal	Great Britain
bronze medal	Not awarded

The 2021 IWBF Men's European Championship was the 25th edition of the European Wheelchair Basketball Championship and will be held in Madrid, Netherlands from 4 to 12 December 2021.

The Dutch and British teams reached the final after winning their respective semi-final games. The Netherlands was declared winner of the tournament following the withdrawal of Great Britain after one of the team members tested positive for COVID-19. The third place game between Germany and Italy didn't take place as both teams withdrew over COVID-19 concerns. Both teams were placed in joint-fourth place in the final standings, and the bronze medal wasn't awarded.

Turkey left the tournament over COVID-19 concerns on the third day of the competition. All (group) games involving the Turkish team were considered forfeited, leaving Turkey in the 6th place in group B, finishing 12th in the final standings.

The top five teams of the tournament qualified for the 2022 World Championships in Dubai.

== Format ==
The twelve teams that qualified for the tournament were divided into two groups of six. The top four teams of each group advanced to the quarter-finals of the knockout stage.

Each team had a squad of twelve players for the tournament. Players are given an eight-level-score specific to wheelchair basketball, ranging from 1 to 4.5. Lower scores represent a higher degree of disability. The sum score of all players on the court cannot exceed 14.

== Preliminary round ==
All times local (UTC+01:00)

=== Group A ===
Pos	Team	Pld	W	L	PF	PA	PD	Pts	Qualification
1	Germany	5	5	0	387	241	+146	10	Quarter-finals
2	Spain	5	4	1	363	288	+75	9	Quarter-finals
3	Poland	5	3	2	349	320	+29	8	Quarter-finals
4	France	5	2	3	344	286	+58	7	Quarter-finals
5	Switzerland	5	1	4	256	326	−70	6	Placement games
6	Lithuania	5	0	5	171	409	−238	5	Placement games

Source: IWBF
Rules for classification: 1) Wins; 2) Head-to-head results; 3) Points difference; 4) Points scored.

4 December
12:30

Report

Poland	69–54	Switzerland
Scoring by quarter: 14–17, 25–11, 18–11, 12–9

Centro Deportivo Municipal Francisco Fernández Ochoa
Madrid

4 December
16:45

Report

Germany	87–19	Lithuania
Scoring by quarter: 10–8, 22–4, 31–5, 24–2

Centro Deportivo Municipal Francisco Fernández Ochoa
Madrid

4 December
20:00

Report

Spain	64–61	France
Scoring by quarter: 22–17, 11–19, 17–10, 14–15

Centro Deportivo Municipal Francisco Fernández Ochoa
Madrid

5 December
11:00

Report

Lithuania	41–81	Poland
Scoring by quarter: 12–21, 7–18, 11–26, 11–16

Centro Deportivo Municipal Francisco Fernández Ochoa
Madrid

5 December
13:15

Report

Switzerland	48–76	Spain
Scoring by quarter: 14–15, 16–19, 11–25, 7–17

Centro Deportivo Municipal Francisco Fernández Ochoa
Madrid

5 December
17:45

Report

France	55–69	Germany
Scoring by quarter: 11–20, 8–22, 15–13, 21–14

Centro Deportivo Municipal Francisco Fernández Ochoa
Madrid

6 December
12:15

Report

Spain	86–48	Lithuania
Scoring by quarter: 26–4, 19–17, 20–19, 21–8

Centro Deportivo Municipal Francisco Fernández Ochoa
Madrid

6 December
16:45

Report

Germany	72–70	Poland
Scoring by quarter: 16–19, 21–21, 19–18, 16–12

Centro Deportivo Municipal Francisco Fernández Ochoa
Madrid

6 December
19:00

Report

France	66–48	Switzerland
Scoring by quarter: 15–16, 20–8, 17–12, 14–12

Centro Deportivo Municipal Francisco Fernández Ochoa
Madrid

7 December
11:00

Report

Germany	86–43	Switzerland
Scoring by quarter: 17–6, 28–17, 21–11, 20–9

Centro Deportivo Municipal Francisco Fernández Ochoa
Madrid

7 December
13:15

Report

Lithuania	34–92	France
Scoring by quarter: 9–21, 11–23, 5–27, 9–21

Centro Deportivo Municipal Francisco Fernández Ochoa
Madrid

7 December
17:45

Report

Poland	58–83	Spain
Scoring by quarter: 17–26, 16–10, 13–24, 12–23

Centro Deportivo Municipal Francisco Fernández Ochoa
Madrid

8 December
10:00

Report

France	70–71	Poland
Scoring by quarter: 21–20, 17–21, 16–19, 16–11

Centro Deportivo Municipal Francisco Fernández Ochoa
Madrid

8 December
16:45

Report

Spain	54–73	Germany
Scoring by quarter: 19–11, 15–28, 12–21, 8–13

Centro Deportivo Municipal Francisco Fernández Ochoa
Madrid

8 December
19:00

Report

Switzerland	63–29	Lithuania
Scoring by quarter: 19–10, 16–8, 16–6, 12–5

Centro Deportivo Municipal Francisco Fernández Ochoa
Madrid

=== Group B ===
Pos	Team	Pld	W	L	PF	PA	PD	Pts	Qualification
1	Great Britain	5	5	0	352	182	+170	10	Quarter-finals
2	Netherlands	5	4	1	289	180	+109	9	Quarter-finals
3	Italy	5	3	2	259	219	+40	8	Quarter-finals
4	Austria	5	2	3	173	316	−143	7	Quarter-finals
5	Israel	5	1	4	211	287	−76	6	Placement games
6	Turkey	0	0	0	0	100	−100	0	Placement games

Source: IWBF
Rules for classification: 1) Wins; 2) Head-to-head results; 3) Points difference; 4) Points scored.

4 December
11:45

Report

Italy	82–28	Austria
Scoring by quarter: 18–9, 17–8, 27–4, 20–7

Centro Deportivo Municipal Francisco Fernández Ochoa
Madrid

4 December
14:00

Report

Turkey	0 [55] (Note: As Turkey left the tournament over COVID-19 concerns, all games involving the Turkish team, including the group games that did take place, were considered forfeited, and a default regulatory 20:0 score was awarded to its opponents.)–20 [63]	Netherlands
Scoring by quarter: 12–16, 15–16, 12–17, 16–14

Centro Deportivo Municipal Francisco Fernández Ochoa
Madrid

4 December
16:15

Report

Great Britain	103–46	Israel
Scoring by quarter: 15–18, 32–10, 27–12, 29–6

Centro Deportivo Municipal Francisco Fernández Ochoa
Madrid

5 December
12:15

Report

Austria	20 [41]–0 [73]	Turkey
Scoring by quarter: 10–25, 11–23, 12–10, 8–15

Centro Deportivo Municipal Francisco Fernández Ochoa
Madrid

5 December
14:30

Report

Netherlands	45–69	Great Britain
Scoring by quarter: 10–21, 6–16, 8–10, 21–22

Centro Deportivo Municipal Francisco Fernández Ochoa
Madrid

5 December
19:00

Report

Israel	48–64	Italy
Scoring by quarter: 13–19, 7–12, 10–10, 18–23

Centro Deportivo Municipal Francisco Fernández Ochoa
Madrid

6 December
11:00

Report

Netherlands	63–41	Israel
Scoring by quarter: 14–9, 17–12, 16–4, 16–16

Centro Deportivo Municipal Francisco Fernández Ochoa
Madrid

6 December
15:30

Report

Turkey	0 –20	Italy

Centro Deportivo Municipal Francisco Fernández Ochoa
Madrid

6 December
17:45

Report

Great Britain	99–51	Austria
Scoring by quarter: 19–7, 19–23, 25–15, 36–6

Centro Deportivo Municipal Francisco Fernández Ochoa
Madrid

7 December
10:00

Report

Turkey	0 –20	Israel

Centro Deportivo Municipal Francisco Fernández Ochoa
Madrid

7 December
16:45

Report

Austria	17–79	Netherlands
Scoring by quarter: 6–25, 4–21, 3–15, 4–18

Centro Deportivo Municipal Francisco Fernández Ochoa
Madrid

7 December
19:00

Report

Italy	40–61	Great Britain
Scoring by quarter: 2–15, 17–16, 8–10, 13–20

Centro Deportivo Municipal Francisco Fernández Ochoa
Madrid

8 December
11:00

Report

Netherlands	82–53	Italy
Scoring by quarter: 24–8, 22–8, 19–12, 17–25

Centro Deportivo Municipal Francisco Fernández Ochoa
Madrid

8 December
13:15

Report

Israel	56–57	Austria
Scoring by quarter: 14–21, 8–14, 18–13, 16–9

Centro Deportivo Municipal Francisco Fernández Ochoa
Madrid

8 December
17:45

Report

Great Britain	20–0	Turkey

Centro Deportivo Municipal Francisco Fernández Ochoa
Madrid

== Knockout stage ==
Quarter-finals
9 December
Germany	98
Austria	52
9 December
Netherlands	62
Poland	58
9 December
Great Britain	81
France	56
9 December
Spain	45
Italy	62

Semi-finals
10 December
Germany	56
Netherlands	65
10 December
Great Britain	65
Italy	43

Final
12 December
Netherlands	20
Great Britain	0 (Note: After a member of the British team tested positive for COVID-19, the British decided to withdraw from the competition and return home without playing the final. In accordance with regulations, the game was considered forfeited and therefore awarded to the opposing team with a default regulatory 20–0 score.)
Third place
12 December
Germany	0
Italy	0

=== Placement games ===
Eleventh place game

11 December
13:15

[ Report]

Turkey	0 –20	Lithuania

Centro Deportivo Municipal Francisco Fernández Ochoa
Madrid

Ninth place game

11 December
15:30

Report

Switzerland	48–62	Israel
Scoring by quarter: 10–24, 14–12, 18–11, 6–15

Centro Deportivo Municipal Francisco Fernández Ochoa
Madrid

Seventh place game

11 December
10:00

Report

Austria	49–71	Spain
Scoring by quarter: 10–24, 17–18, 10–10, 12–19

Centro Deportivo Municipal Francisco Fernández Ochoa
Madrid

Fifth place game

11 December
20:00

Report

Poland	78–79 (OT)	France
Scoring by quarter: 23–13, 12–16, 14–17, 15–18, Overtime: 14–15

Centro Deportivo Municipal Francisco Fernández Ochoa
Madrid

=== Quarter-finals ===
9 December
15:30

Report

Spain	45–62	Italy
Scoring by quarter: 17–15, 6–15, 6–14, 16–19

Centro Deportivo Municipal Francisco Fernández Ochoa
Madrid

9 December
16:45

Report

Great Britain	81–56	France
Scoring by quarter: 16–14, 16–9, 23–20, 26–13

Centro Deportivo Municipal Francisco Fernández Ochoa
Madrid

9 December
17:45

Report

Germany	98–52	Austria
Scoring by quarter: 21–14, 25–19, 20–8, 26–11

Centro Deportivo Municipal Francisco Fernández Ochoa
Madrid

9 December
19:00

Report

Netherlands	62–58	Poland
Scoring by quarter: 13–15, 12–13, 21–15, 16–15

Centro Deportivo Municipal Francisco Fernández Ochoa
Madrid

=== Semi-finals ===
10 December
14:30

Report

Germany	58–65	Netherlands
Scoring by quarter: 19–15, 15–16, 18–9, 6–25

Centro Deportivo Municipal Francisco Fernández Ochoa
Madrid

10 December
19:00

Report

Great Britain	65–43	Italy
Scoring by quarter: 16–8, 17–17, 15–10, 17–8

Centro Deportivo Municipal Francisco Fernández Ochoa
Madrid

=== Third place game ===
12 December
16:00

Report

Germany	0–0	Italy

Centro Deportivo Municipal Francisco Fernández Ochoa
Madrid

=== Final ===
12 December
18:30

Report

Netherlands	20–0	Great Britain

Centro Deportivo Municipal Francisco Fernández Ochoa
Madrid

== Final standings ==
Rank	Team
1st place, gold medalist(s)	Netherlands
2nd place, silver medalist(s)	Great Britain
3rd place, bronze medalist(s)	Not awarded
4	Germany
4	Italy
5	France
6	Poland
7	Spain
8	Austria
9	Israel
10	Switzerland
11	Lithuania
12	Turkey

== See also ==
- 2021 IWBF Women's European Championship
