= George Swindlehurst =

Former Paralympic athlete from Great Britain

George Swindlehurst MBE
Personal information
- Full name: George Henry Swindlehurst
- Nationality: Great Britain
- Born: 1925 Stockport, Cheshire
- Died: 25 April 2009 (aged 83–84) Macclesfield, Cheshire
Medal record
Representing United Kingdom
Paralympic Games
Table tennis
Silver medal – second place	1964 Tokyo	Men's Doubles C
Bronze medal – third place	1960 Rome	Men's Doubles C
Wheelchair basketball
Silver medal – second place	1960 Rome	Men's Tournament Class A
Silver medal – second place	1964 Tokyo	Men's Tournament A complete

George Henry Swindlehurst MBE (1925–2009), also known as Ginger, was a former Paralympic athlete from Great Britain who competed in the early editions of the Paralympic Games, taking part in table tennis and wheelchair basketball. He was born in 1925 in Stockport.

He enlisted in the Coldstream Guards in 1943 at the age of 18. Whilst serving his country in Arnhem, Holland he was shot in the back and paralysed.

== Paralympics career ==
In 1960, in Rome, Swindlehurst competed in the first Summer Paralympics as part of the men's wheelchair basketball team where he and the British team won silver in Men's Tournament Class A and he won bronze in men's doubles table tennis. In the 1964 Games in Tokyo, Swindlehurst won silver medals in both sports.

He competed in the men's wheelchair basketball tournaments right up to 1972. At the end of his sporting career he was awarded a Gold Medal Triad in 2000, as well as receiving an MBE.
