= 2019 IWBF Men's European Championship =

24th European Wheelchair Basketball Championship

- Location: Wałbrzych, Poland
- Start date: 28 August
- End date: 9 September
- Competitors: 12 teams from 12 nations

Medalists
gold medal	Great Britain
silver medal	Spain
bronze medal	Turkey

The 2019 IWBF Men's European Championship was the 24th edition of the European Wheelchair Basketball Championship held in Wałbrzych, Poland from 28 August to 9 September 2019.

== Squads ==
Each of the 12 teams selected a squad of 12 players for the tournament.

Athletes are given an eight-level-score specific to wheelchair basketball, ranging from 0.5 to 4.5. Lower scores represent a higher degree of disability. The sum score of all players on the court cannot exceed 14.

== Preliminary round ==
All times local (UTC+02:00)

=== Group A ===
Team̹̹	Pld	W	L	PF	PA	PD	Pts
Great Britain	5	5	0	419	247	+172	10
Germany	5	4	1	373	279	+94	9
Italy	5	3	2	320	316	+4	8
Poland	5	2	3	336	333	-3	7
Switzerland	5	1	4	234	351	-117	6
Austria	5	0	5	202	358	-156	5

30 August
19:00

report

Poland	79–53	Switzerland

ECMA court 1

31 August
16:45

report

Austria	19–75	Germany

ECMA court 1

31 August
19:00

report

Italy	54–76	Great Britain

ECMA court 1

1 September
14:00

report

Italy	71–47	Austria

ECMA Court1

1 September
16:15

report

Great Britain	90–35	Switzerland

ECMA Court 2

1 September
18:30

report

Germany	79–71	Poland

ECMA Court 2

2 September
18:14:30

report

Austria	39–95	Great Britain

ECMA Court 1

2 September
16:45

report

Poland	68–70	Italy

ECMA Court 1

2 September
19:00

report

Switzerland	42–80	Germany

ECMA Court 1

3 September
14:00

report

Great Britain	83–61	Poland

RCMA Court 2

3 September
16:15

report

Switzerland	60–49	Austria

ECMA Court 2

3 September
18:30

report

Germany	81–72	Italy

ECMA Court 2

4 September
14:30

report

Great Britain	75–58	Germany

ECMA Court 1

4 September
16:45

report

Italy	53–44	Switzerland

ECMA Court 1

4 September
19:00

report

Poland	57–48	Austria

ECMA Court 1

=== Group B ===
Team̹̹	Pld	W	L	PF	PA	PD	Pts
Spain	5	5	0	411	213	+198	10
Turkey	5	4	1	367	299	+68	9
Netherlands	5	3	2	305	278	+27	8
France	5	2	3	288	385	-97	7
Israel	5	1	4	304	359	-55	6
Russia	5	0	5	229	370	-141	5

31 August
14:00

report

France	86–79	Israel

ECMA Court 2

31 August
16:15

report

Turkey	63–52	Russia

ECMA Court 2

31 August
18:30

report

Spain	83–36	Netherlands

ECMA Court 2

1 September
14:30

report

Israel	59–91	Turkey

ECMA Court 1

1 September
16:45

report

Russia	35–101	Spain

ECMA Court 1

1 September
19:00

report

Netherlands	73–42	France

ECMA Court 1

2 September
14:00

report

Spain	75–56	Israel

ECMA Court 2

2 September
16:15

report

France	59–91	Turkey

ECMA Court 2

2 September
18:30

report

Russia	40–72	Netherlands

RCMA Court 2

3 September
14:30

report

Spain	76–25	France

ECMA Court 1

3 September
16:45

report

Turkey	61–53	Netherlands

ECMA Court 1

3 September
19:00

report

Israel	58–36	Russia

ECMA 1

4 September
14:00

report

France	76–'66	Russia

ECMA Court 2

4 September
16:15

report

Netherlands	71–52	Israel

ECMA Court 2

4 September
18:30

report

Turkey	61–76	Spain

RCMA Court 2

== Knockout stage ==
=== Brackets ===
9th–12th place semifinals

9th–12th place semifinals
6 September 2019
Switzerland	77
Russia	70
6 September 2019
Austria	45
Israel	55

Ninth place
7 September 2019
Israel	54
Switzerland	67
Eleventh place
7 September 2019
Russia	56
Austria	62

Quarter-finals

Quarter-finals
6 September 2019
Great Britain	93
France	51
6 September 2019
Turkey	63
Italy	58
6 September 2019
Netherlands	63
Germany	72
6 September 2019
Poland	62
Spain	79

Semi-finals
7 September 2019
Turkey	81
Great Britain	94
7 September 2019
Germany	60
Spain	70

Final
9 September 2019
Great Britain	77
Spain	52
Third place
9 September 2019
Germany	65
Turkey	76

5th–8th place semifinals

5th–8th place semifinals
7 September 2019
France	51
Italy	63
7 September 2019
Poland	73
Netherlands	67

Fifth place
8 September 2019
Poland	72
Italy	84
Seventh place
8 September 2019
Netherlands	95
France	46

=== 9th–12th place semifinals ===
6 September
14:00

report

Switzerland	77–70	Russia

ECMA Court 2

6 September
14:30

report

Austria	45–55	Israel

ECMA Court 1

=== 11th place ===
7 September
18:30

report

Russia	56–62	Austria

ECMA Court 2

=== 9th place ===
7 September
19:30

report

Israel	54–67	Switzerland

ECMA Court 1

=== Quarter-finals ===
6 September
16:15

report

Great Britain	93–51	France

ECMA Court 2

6 September
16:45

report

Netherlands	63–72	Germany

ECMA Court 1

6 September
18:30

report

Turkey	63–58	Italy

ECMA Court 2

6 September
19:00

report

Poland	62–79	Spain

ECMA Court 1

=== 5th–8th place semifinals ===
7 September
14:00

report

France	51–63	Italy

ECMA Court 2

7 September
16:15

report

Poland	73–67	Netherlands

ECMA Court 2

=== 7th place ===
8 September
10:00

report

Netherlands	95–46	France

ECMA Court 1

=== 5th place ===
8 September
12:15

report

Poland	72–84	Italy

ECMA Court 1

=== Semi-finals ===
7 September
14:30

report

Turkey	81–94	Great Britain

ECMA Court 1

7 September
16:45

report

Germany	60–70	Spain

ECMA Court 1

=== 3rd place ===
8 September
14:30

report

Germany	65–76	Turkey

ECMA Court 1

=== Final ===
8 September
17:00

report

Great Britain	77–52	Spain

ECMA Court 1

== Final standings ==
Rank	Team
1	Great Britain
2	Spain
3	Turkey
4	Germany
5	Italy
6	Poland
7	Netherlands
8	France
9	Switzerland
10	Israel
11	Austria
12	Russia

2019 IWBF Men's European Championship

Great Britain
7th title
