= Netherlands men's national wheelchair basketball team =

Netherlands
Paralympic Games
- Appearances: 13
- Medals: Gold: 1992; Silver: 1960, 1984, 1988, 2000

World Championships
- Appearances: ?
- Medals: Silver: 1979, 1998; Bronze: 1973, 1986
Home	Away

The Netherlands men's national wheelchair basketball team is the men's wheelchair basketball side that represents the Netherlands in the major wheelchair basketball competitions.

It has thirteen European medals including a title, two world finals and the Paralympic title in its fifth final (won in 1992 in front of Germany and France) on its record.

== Competitions ==
=== Summer Paralympics ===
Year	Position	W	L
(Italy) 1960	A - 4th	0	2
(Italy) 1960	B - (silver)	4	1
(Japan) 1964	A - ?	?	?
(Japan) 1964	B - ?	?	?
(Israel) 1968	11th	1	3
(Germany) 1972	9th	1	3
(Canada) 1976	4th	4	3
(Netherlands) 1980	12th	?	?
(United States) 1984	2nd place, silver medalist(s)	6	2
(South Korea) 1988	2nd place, silver medalist(s)	5	1
(Spain) 1992	1st place, gold medalist(s)	8	0
(United States) 1996	7th	3	4
(Australia) 2000	2nd place, silver medalist(s)	7	1
(Greece) 2004	4th	5	3
(China) 2008	Did not qualify		
(United Kingdom) 2012	Did not qualify		
(Brazil) 2016	7th	3	4
(Japan) 2020	Did not qualify		
Total	13/16	47	25

=== World Championship ===
Year	Position	W	L
(Belgium) 1973	3rd place, bronze medalist(s)	?	?
(Belgium) 1975	4th	?	?
(United States) 1979	2nd place, silver medalist(s)	?	?
(Canada) 1983	?	?	?
(Australia) 1986	3rd place, bronze medalist(s)	?	?
(Belgium) 1990	4th	?	?
(Belgium) 1994	?	?	?
(United States) 1998	2nd place, silver medalist(s)		
(United States) 2002	?	?	?
(Netherlands) 1998	4th	?	?
(United Kingdom) 2010	Did not qualify		
(South Korea) 2014	16th	2	5
(Germany) 2018	10th	2	3
(Emirate of Dubai) 2022	4th	5	2
Total	10/14	9	10

=== European Championship ===
Year	Position	W	L
(France) 1971	3rd place, bronze medalist(s)	?	?
(France) 1974	2nd place, silver medalist(s)	?	?
(Netherlands) 1977	2nd place, silver medalist(s)	?	?
(France) 1978	3rd place, bronze medalist(s)	?	?
(Switzerland) 1981	3rd place, bronze medalist(s)	?	?
(France) 1987	2nd place, silver medalist(s)	?	?
(France) 1989	2nd place, silver medalist(s)	?	?
(Spain) 1991	2nd place, silver medalist(s)	?	?
(Germany) 1993	1st place, gold medalist(s)	?	?
(France) 1995	3rd place, bronze medalist(s)	?	?
(Spain) 1997	?	?	?
(Netherlands) 1999	3rd place, bronze medalist(s)	?	?
(Netherlands) 2001–02	2nd place, silver medalist(s)	?	?
(Italy) 2003	2nd place, silver medalist(s)	?	?
(France) 2005	?	?	?
(Germany) 2007	?	?	?
(Turkey) 2009	?	?	?
(Israel) 2011	8th	?	?
(Germany) 2013	7th	4	4
(United Kingdom) 2015	4th	4	4
(Spain) 2017	4th	5	3
(Netherlands) 2019	7th	4	4
(Spain) 2021	1st place, gold medalist(s)	7	1
(Netherlands) 2023	3rd place, bronze medalist(s)	7	1
Total	24/26	31	17

== See also ==
- Netherlands national basketball team
- Netherlands women's national wheelchair basketball team
