= 2017 IWBF Men's European Championship =

- Location: Tenerife, Spain
- Start date: 21 June
- End date: 30 June
- Competitors: 12 teams from 12 nations

Medalists
gold medal	Turkey
silver medal	Great Britain
bronze medal	Germany

The 2017 IWBF Men's European Championship was the 23rd edition of the European Wheelchair Basketball Championship held in Tenerife, Spain from 21 June to 30 June 2017.

== Squads ==
Each of the 12 teams selected a squad of 12 players for the tournament.

Athletes are given an eight-level-score specific to wheelchair basketball, ranging from 0.5 to 4.5. Lower scores represent a higher degree of disability The sum score of all players on the court cannot exceed 14.

== Preliminary round ==
All times local (UTC+02:00)

=== Group A ===
Team̹̹	Pld	W	L	PF	PA	PD	Pts
Netherlands	5	4	1	302	260	+42	9
Spain	5	4	1	321	279	+42	9
Poland	5	3	2	331	308	+23	8
Italy	5	2	3	296	305	-9	7
France	5	2	3	305	305	0	7
Switzerland	5	0	5	279	377	-98	5

21 June
20:45

report

Spain	73–54	Switzerland

22 June
13:15

report

Netherlands	58–61	Poland

22 June
20:00

report

Italy	59–57	France

23 June
11:00

report

Switzerland	64–79	Italy

23 June
13:15

report

Poland	59–70	Spain

23 June
18:45

report

France	54–57	Netherlands

24 June
12:15

report

Spain	64–54	France

24 June
17:45

report

Netherlands	52–50	Italy

24 June
20:00

report

Poland	76–59	Switzerland

25 June
11:00

report

Netherlands	75–41	Switzerland

25 June
13:15

report

France	66–64	Poland

25 June
18:45

report

Italy	52–60	Spain

26 June
12:15

report

Poland	71–55	Italy

26 June
15:30

report

Spain	54–60	Netherlands

26 June
17:45

report

Switzerland	61–74	France

=== Group B ===
Team̹̹	Pld	W	L	PF	PA	PD	Pts
Turkey	5	5	0	396	253	+143	10
Great Britain	5	4	1	414	260	+154	9
Germany	5	3	2	310	310	0	8
Israel	5	2	3	266	368	-102	7
Sweden	5	1	4	298	356	-58	6
Lithuania	5	0	5	261	398	-137	5

22 June
14:15

report

Great Britain	79–56	Sweden

22 June
16:30

report

Germany	63–41	Lithuania

22 June
18:45

report

Turkey	90–37	Israel

23 June
11:00

report

Lithuania	53–77	Turkey

23 June
15:30

report

Israel	43–86	Great Britain

23 June
20:00

report

Sweden	58–79	Germany

24 June
11:00

report

Israel	66–53	Sweden

24 June
16:30

report

Turkey	87–45	Germany

24 June
18:45

report

Great Britain	120–52	Lithuania

25 June
10:00

report

Turkey	71–58	Sweden

25 June
17:45

report

Lithuania	54–65	Israel

25 June
20:00

report

Germany	38–69	Great Britain

26 June
11:00

report

Israel	55–85	Germany

26 June
13:15

report

Sweden	73–61	Lithuania

26 June
16:30

report

Great Britain	60–71	Turkey

== Knockout stage ==
Quarter-finals
27 June 2017
Netherlands	63
Israel	49
27 June 2017
Poland	69
Great Britain	96
27 June 2017
Turkey	66
Italy	63
27 June 2017
Germany	70
Spain	63

Semi-finals
28 June 2017
Netherlands	55
Great Britain	72
28 June 2017
Turkey	68
Germany	64

Final
30 June 2017
Great Britain	69
Turkey	76
Third place
30 June 2017
Netherlands	56
Germany	61

=== 5-8 ===
5th–8th place semifinals
28 June 2017
Italy	42
Spain	62
28 June 2017
Poland	89
Israel	72

Fifth place
29 June 2017
Spain	85
Poland	70
Seventh place
29 June 2017
Italy	59
Israel	53

=== 9-12 ===
9th–12th place semifinals
27 June 2017
Lithuania	62
France	68
27 June 2017
Switzerland	61
Sweden	56

Ninth place
29 June 2017
France	79
Switzerland	73
Eleventh place
29 June 2017
Lithuania	82
Sweden	77

== Final standings ==
Rank	Team
1	Turkey
2	Great Britain
3	Germany
4	Netherlands
5	Spain
6	Poland
7	Italy
8	Israel
9	France
10	Switzerland
11	Lithuania
12	Sweden

2017 IWBF Men's European Championship

Turkey
1st title

== All Star Team ==
Nation	Name	Shirt #	Class
Poland	Marcin Balcerowski	12	1.0
Germany	Thomas Böhme	13	3.0
Turkey	Özgür Gürbulak	5	4.0
Great Britain	Abdi Jama	10	1.0
Italy	Ahmed Raourahi	14	1.5
