= Japan men's national wheelchair basketball team =

Japan
- IWBF zone: IWBF Asia Oceania
- National federation: Japan Wheelchair Basketball Federation (JWBF)

Paralympic Games
- Appearances: 10

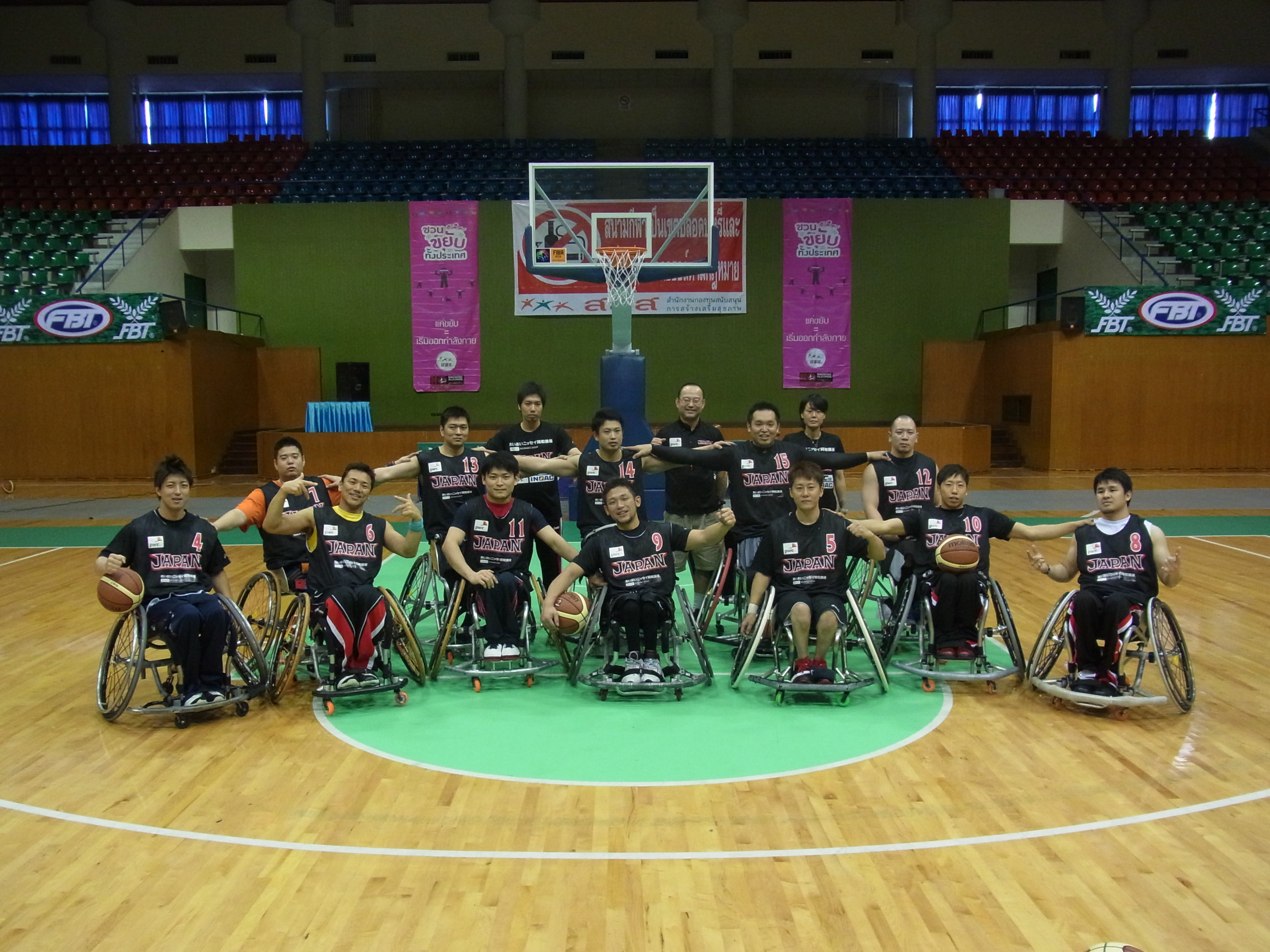
Wheelchair Basketball Asia Oceania Championship 2013

The Japan men's national wheelchair basketball team is the wheelchair basketball side that represents Japan in international competitions for men as part of the International Wheelchair Basketball Federation.

== Current roster ==
The following 12 players named for the Wheelchair basketball at the 2020 Summer Paralympics – Men's tournament.

Head coach:Kazuyuki Kyoya

#	Name	Class.
1	Akira Toyoshima（豊島 英）	2.0
2	Renshi Chokai（鳥海 連志）	2.5
6	Rin Kawahara（川原凛）	1.5
7	Takuya Furusawa（古澤拓也）	3.0
8	Ryuga Akaishi（赤石竜我）	2.5
10	Tetsuya Miyajima（宮島徹也）	4.0
11	Kiyoshi Fujisawa（藤澤潔）	2.0
13	Reo Fujimoto（藤本 怜央）	4.5
21	Yoshinobu Takamatsu（髙柗義伸）	4.0）
25	Kei Akita（秋田啓）	3.5
26	Takayoshi Iwai（岩井孝義）	1.0
55	Hiroaki Kōzai（香西 宏昭）	3.5

== Competitions ==
=== Wheelchair Basketball World Championship ===
Year	Position	W	L
(France) 1994	11th		
(Australia) 1998	9th		
(Japan) 2002	8th		
(Netherlands) 2006	7th		
(United Kingdom) 2010	10th	2	5
(South Korea) 2014	9th	3	4
(Germany) 2018	9th	3	2
Total			

=== Summer Paralympics ===
Year	Position	W	L
(Canada) 1976			
(Netherlands) 1980			
(United States) / (United Kingdom) 1984			
(South Korea) 1988			
(Spain) 1992	9th		
(United States) 1996	8th		
(Australia) 2000	9th	2	5
(Greece) 2004	8th	2	5
(China) 2008	7th	3	5
(United Kingdom) 2012	9th	2	4
(Brazil) 2016	9th	2	4
(Japan) 2020	2nd place, silver medalist(s)	6	2
(France) 2024			
Total			

=== Other ===
Year	Position	W	L
(Kuwait) 2013			

== See also ==
- Japan women's national wheelchair basketball team
