= Wheelchair basketball at the 2000 Summer Paralympics – Men's tournament =

Wheelchair basketball – Men at the XI Paralympic Games
- Paralympic Wheelchair Basketball
- Venue: The Dome and Exhibition Complex
- Dates: 19 to 28 October 2000
- Competitors: 144 from 12 nations

Medalists
1st place, gold medalist(s)		Canada (CAN)
2nd place, silver medalist(s)		Netherlands (NED)
3rd place, bronze medalist(s)		United States (USA)

The men's tournament was won by the team representing Canada.

== Preliminary round ==
Group A
Rank	Team	Pld	W	L	PF:PA	Pts	CAN	USA	GBR	GER	MEX	RSA
1	Canada	5	5	0	327:196	10	x	58:45	55:50	68:43	61:33	85:25
2	United States	5	4	1	334:238	9	45:58	x	74:65	58:46	60:44	97:25
3	Great Britain	5	3	2	329:262	8	50:55	65:74	x	61:43	70:58	83:32
4	Germany	5	2	3	314:270	7	43:68	46:58	43:61	x	69:56	113:27
5	Mexico	5	1	4	274:294	6	33:61	44:60	58:70	56:69	x	83:34
6	South Africa	5	0	5	143:461	5	25:85	25:97	32:83	27:113	34:83	x

Group B
Rank	Team	Pld	W	L	PF:PA	Pts	NED	FRA	AUS	SWE	JPN	KOR
1	Netherlands	5	5	0	331:243	10	x	76:51	48:47	62:45	62:52	83:48
2	France	5	4	1	296:272	9	51:76	x	62:54	51:50	67:44	65:48
3	Australia	5	3	2	311:233	8	47:48	54:62	x	69:54	64:36	77:33
4	Sweden	5	2	3	266:280	7	45:62	50:51	54:69	x	60:43	57:55
5	Japan	5	1	4	239:296	6	52:62	44:67	36:64	43:60	x	64:43
6	South Korea	5	0	5	227:346	5	48:83	48:65	33:77	55:57	43:64	x

Qualified for quarterfinals
Eliminated

Source: Paralympic.org

== Medal round ==
Quarterfinals
United States	62
Australia	54
Netherlands	72
Germany	66
Canada	73
Sweden	39
France	56
Great Britain	67

Semifinals
United States	62
Netherlands	63
Canada	66
Great Britain	51

Finals
Netherlands	43
Canada	57
Third place
United States	57
Great Britain	54

Source: Paralympic.org

== Classification 5-8 ==
Classification round
Australia	61
Germany	53
Sweden	74
France	75

Fifth place
Australia	50
France	47
Third place
Germany	40
Sweden	56

Source: Paralympic.org

== Classification 9-12 ==
Classification round
Mexico	70
South Korea	56
Japan	81
South Africa	29

Ninth place
Mexico	50
Japan	56
Third place
South Korea	75
South Africa	42

Source: Paralympic.org

== Ranking ==
Place	Team
1st place, gold medalist(s)	Canada
2nd place, silver medalist(s)	Netherlands
3rd place, bronze medalist(s)	United States
4.	Great Britain
5.	Australia
6.	France
7.	Sweden
8.	Germany
9.	Japan
10.	Mexico
11.	South Korea
12.	South Africa
