= Wheelchair basketball at the 2004 Summer Paralympics – Men's tournament =

Wheelchair basketball – Men at the XII Paralympic Games
- Paralympic Wheelchair Basketball
- Venue: Olympic Indoor Hall
- Dates: 18–28 September 2004
- Competitors: 144 from 12 nations

Medalists
| 1st place, gold medalist(s) | | Canada (CAN) |
| 2nd place, silver medalist(s) | | Australia (AUS) |
| 3rd place, bronze medalist(s) | | Great Britain (GBR) |

The men's tournament was won by the team representing Canada.

== Preliminary round ==
Group A
| Rank | Team | Pld | W | L | PF:PA | Pts | CAN | AUS | GBR | ITA | BRA | FRA |
|---|---|---|---|---|---|---|---|---|---|---|---|---|
| 1 | Canada | 5 | 5 | 0 | 353:235 | 10 | x | 66:38 | 63:45 | 83:54 | 78:55 | 63:43 |
| 2 | Australia | 5 | 4 | 1 | 315:281 | 9 | 38:66 | x | 80:59 | 57:52 | 66:51 | 74:53 |
| 3 | Great Britain | 5 | 2 | 3 | 293:294 | 7 | 45:63 | 59:80 | x | 48:51 | 66:57 | 75:43 |
| 4 | Italy | 5 | 2 | 3 | 276:307 | 7 | 54:83 | 52:57 | 51:48 | x | 67:50 | 52:69 |
| 5 | Brazil | 5 | 1 | 4 | 287:331 | 6 | 55:78 | 51:66 | 57:66 | 50:67 | x | 74:54 |
| 6 | France | 5 | 1 | 4 | 262:338 | 6 | 43:63 | 53:74 | 43:75 | 69:52 | 54:74 | x |

Group B
| Rank | Team | Pld | W | L | PF:PA | Pts | NED | USA | GER | JPN | IRI | GRE |
|---|---|---|---|---|---|---|---|---|---|---|---|---|
| 1 | Netherlands | 5 | 4 | 1 | 388:261 | 9 | x | 82:66 | 52:63 | 76:47 | 83:51 | 95:34 |
| 2 | United States | 5 | 4 | 1 | 349:254 | 9 | 66:82 | x | 71:49 | 54:46 | 73:50 | 85:27 |
| 3 | Germany | 5 | 4 | 1 | 359:273 | 9 | 63:52 | 49:71 | x | 79:58 | 67:53 | 101:39 |
| 4 | Japan | 5 | 2 | 3 | 303:298 | 7 | 47:76 | 46:54 | 58:79 | x | 79:57 | 73:32 |
| 5 | Iran | 5 | 1 | 4 | 292:335 | 6 | 51:83 | 50:73 | 53:67 | 57:79 | x | 81:33 |
| 6 | Greece | 5 | 0 | 5 | 165:435 | 5 | 34:95 | 27:85 | 39:101 | 32:73 | 33:81 | x |

Qualified for quarterfinals
Eliminated

Source: Paralympic.org

== Medal round ==
Quarterfinals
Australia | 79
Germany | 60
United States | 59
Great Britain | 62
Netherlands | 70
Italy | 64
Canada | 50
Japan | 48

Semifinals
Australia | 64
Great Britain | 52
Netherlands | 70
Canada | 91

Finals
Australia | 53
Canada | 70
Third place
Great Britain | 82
Netherlands | 66

Source: Paralympic.org

== Classification 5-12 ==
Classification 5/6

September 2004

| Germany | 76–62 | Italy |

Classification 7/8

September 2004

| United States | 79–56 | Japan |

Classification 9/10

September 2004

| Brazil | 63–67 | Iran |

Classification 11/12

September 2004

| France | 78–55 | Greece |

Source: Paralympic.org

== Ranking ==
| Place | Team |
|---|---|
| 1st place, gold medalist(s) | Canada |
| 2nd place, silver medalist(s) | Australia |
| 3rd place, bronze medalist(s) | Great Britain |
| 4. | Netherlands |
| 5. | Germany |
| 6. | Italy |
| 7. | United States |
| 8. | Japan |
| 9. | Iran |
| 10. | Brazil |
| 11. | France |
| 12. | Greece |
