= Iran men's national wheelchair basketball team =

Iran basketball team

Iran
- IWBF zone: IWBF Asia+Oceania

Paralympic Games
- Appearances: 4

World Championships
- Appearances: 3
- Medals: Bronze: 2022

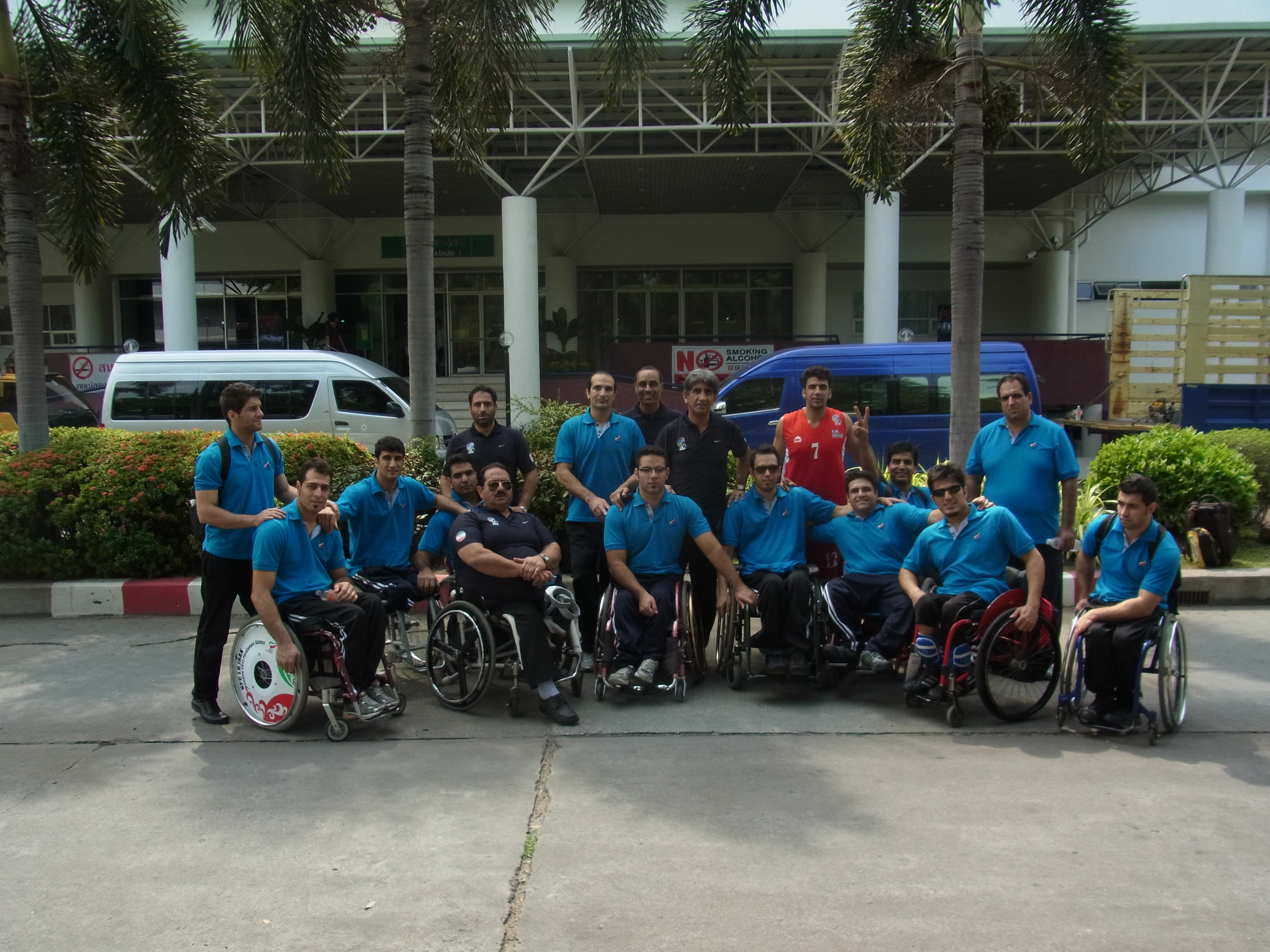
Wheelchair Basketball Asia Oceania Championship 2013

The Iran men's national wheelchair basketball team is the wheelchair basketball side that represents Iran in international competitions for men as part of the International Wheelchair Basketball Federation.

== Competitions ==
The Iran men's team has not competed at the Wheelchair Basketball World Championship, however it has placed behind Japan twice at the 2004 & 2008 & 2016 Summer Paralympics.

=== Wheelchair basketball at the Asian Para Games ===
| Year | Rank | M | W | L | PF | PA | PD |
|---|---|---|---|---|---|---|---|
| China 2010 | Banned | | | | | | |
| South Korea 2014 | 3rd | 6 | 5 | 1 | 535 | 307 | +228 |
| Indonesia 2018 | 1st | 6 | 6 | 0 | 539 | 274 | +265 |
| China 2022 | 3rd | 6 | 5 | 1 | 427 | 235 | +192 |
| Total | 3/4 | 18 | 16 | 2 | 1,501 | 816 | +685 |

=== Asia Oceania Wheelchair Basketball Championships ===
2009 https://web.archive.org/web/20110715213039/http://rubaisport.com/wc_basketball/?competition=408 Asia-Oceania Championship 2009

2013 IWBF Asia-Oceania Championship - W, L

2015 IWBF Asia-Oceania Championship - 6 W, 2 L

2017 IWBF Asia-Oceania Championship - W, L 2017 IWBF Asia-Oceania Championships

2019 IWBF Asia-Oceania Championship - 4 W, 3 L https://hosted.dcd.shared.geniussports.com/IWBF/en/competition/26672/schedule?

2021 IWBF Asia-Oceania Championship - W, L https://hosted.dcd.shared.geniussports.com/IWBF/en/competition/33609/schedule

2024 IWBF Asia-Oceania Championships https://hosted.dcd.shared.geniussports.com/IWBF/en/competition/37733/schedule

2025 IWBF Asia-Oceania Championships https://hosted.dcd.shared.geniussports.com/IWBF/en/competition/47692/schedule

| Year | Position | W | L |
|---|---|---|---|
| 2007 | ? | 0 | 0 |
| 2009-2011 | Banned | 0 | 0 |
| 2013 | 3 | | |
| 2015 | 2 | | |
| 2017 | 2 | | |
| 2019 | 3 | | |
| 2021 | 2 | | |
| 2024 | 2 | | |
| 2025 | 3 | | |
| Total | 7/9 | ? | ? |

=== Wheelchair Basketball World Championship ===
| Year | Position | W | L |
|---|---|---|---|
| 1973-2006 | DNE | 0 | 0 |
| 2010 | Banned | 0 | 0 |
| South Korea 2014 | 8th | 2 | 5 |
| Germany 2018 | 4th | 5 | 2 |
| United Arab Emirates 2022 | 3rd | 4 | 3 |
| Total | 3/14 | 11 | 10 |

=== Summer Paralympics ===
| Year | Position | W | L |
|---|---|---|---|
| 1960-1992 | Did not enter ? | | |
| (United States) 1996 | Did not qualify | | |
| (Australia) 2000 | Did not qualify | | |
| (Greece) 2004 | 9th | 2 | 4 |
| (China) 2008 | 8th | 3 | 5 |
| (United Kingdom) 2012 | Banned | | |
| (Brazil) 2016 | 10th | 2 | 4 |
| (Japan) 2020 | 9th | 2 | 3 |
| (France) 2024 | | | |
| Total | 4/16 | 9 | 16 |

=== Asia-Oceania 3on3 Wheelchair Basketball Championships ===
1. 2025: Did Not Compete due to 2025 War

=== Asia-Oceania U23 Wheelchair Basketball Championships ===
1. 2017 : Champion
2. 2024 : Third place

=== IWBF U23 World Wheelchair Basketball Championship ===
1. 2013: 5th
2. 2017 : ?
3. 2021: DNE because of Israel
4. 2025: Qualified and Withdraw
