= Wheelchair basketball at the 2008 Summer Paralympics – Men's tournament =

Wheelchair basketball – Men at the XIII Paralympic Games
- Paralympic Wheelchair Basketball
- Venue: Beijing National Indoor Stadium
- Dates: 7 September – 16 September 2008
- Competitors: 144 from 12 nations

Medalists
1st place, gold medalist(s)		Australia (AUS)
2nd place, silver medalist(s)		Canada (CAN)
3rd place, bronze medalist(s)		Great Britain (GBR)

== Calendar ==
September	7 / 8 / 9 10 / 11	12	13	14	15	16
Phase	Preliminary; Round	Classification 9-12	Quarterfinals	Semifinals; Placement 11-12	Classification 5-8	Placement: 5-6, 7-8 & 9-10; Gold Medal Match; Bronze Medal Match

== Preliminary round ==
=== Group A ===
Team	Pld	W	L	PF	PA	PD	Pts
Canada (Q)	5	5	0	372	276	+96	10
Germany (Q)	5	3	2	362	298	+64	8
Iran (Q)	5	3	2	359	344	+15	8
Japan (Q)	5	2	3	265	319	−54	7
South Africa	5	1	4	282	367	−85	6
Sweden	5	1	4	309	345	−36	6

Source: Paralympic.org
(Q) Qualified for quarterfinals

Note: All times are local

7 September 2008
09:00

Iran	73–62	South Africa
Scoring by quarter: 13-10, 20-18, 23-15, 17-19
Pts: Ahmadi 24; Rebs: Gharibloo 11; Asts: Ahmadi 10		Pts: Nortje 25; Rebs: Nortje 10; Asts: Taylor 4

National Indoor Stadium, Beijing
Attendance: 11500
Referees: Max Kindervater (GER)

7 September 2008
11:15

Japan	49–61	Sweden
Scoring by quarter: 6-16, 9-17, 19-12, 15-16

National Indoor Stadium, Beijing
Attendance: 12000
Referees: Sebastien Gauthier (CAN)

7 September 2008
20:45

Canada	62–59	Germany
Scoring by quarter: 17-13, 6-13, 19-17, 20-16

National Indoor Stadium, Beijing
Attendance: 11797
Referees: Juan Manuel Urunuela (ESP)

8 September 2008
15:30

Sweden	66–92	Iran
Scoring by quarter: 12-24, 18-23, 22-21, 14-24

National Indoor Stadium, Beijing
Attendance: 1376
Referees: Bill Kuerzi (USA)

8 September 2008
17:45

South Africa	55–80	Canada
Scoring by quarter: 12-25, 12-21, 24-16, 7-18

National Indoor Stadium, Beijing
Attendance: 1376
Referees: Matias Quintana (ARG)

8 September 2008
18:30

Germany	56–58	Japan
Scoring by quarter: 12-18, 17-14, 14-14, 13-12

National Indoor Stadium, Beijing
Attendance: 8580
Referees: Sergio Giordano (CAN)

9 September 2008
10:00

Iran	69–50	Japan
Scoring by quarter: 9-6, 18-15, 17-14, 25-15

National Indoor Stadium, Beijing
Attendance: 1095
Referees: Ian Robert Pursglove (GBR)

9 September 2008
12:15

South Africa	43–96	Germany
Scoring by quarter: 8-21, 8-25, 10-26, 17-24

USTB Gymnasium, Beijing
Attendance: 1095
Referees: Andre Bosveld (NED)

9 September 2008
18:30

Canada	62–52	Sweden
Scoring by quarter: 25-14, 19-11, 14-12, 4-15

National Indoor Stadium, Beijing
Attendance: 8162
Referees: Gabriele Caligiuri (AUS)

10 September 2008
09:00

Japan	48–75	Canada
Scoring by quarter: 7-18, 18-19, 5-21, 18-17

National Indoor Stadium, Beijing
Attendance: 7262
Referees: Seppo Olavi Viljanen (CZE)

10 September 2008
11:15

Sweden	58–64	South Africa
Scoring by quarter: 15-11, 14-16, 13-11, 16-26

National Indoor Stadium, Beijing
Attendance: 7262
Referees: Sergio Giordano (CAN)

10 September 2008
13:30

Germany	73–63	Iran
Scoring by quarter: 10-15, 29-14, 22-13, 12-21

National Indoor Stadium, Beijing
Attendance: 7262
Referees: Sebastien Gauthier (CAN)

11 September 2008
12:15

South Africa	58–60	Japan
Scoring by quarter: 17-15, 10-11, 16-14, 15-20

National Indoor Stadium, Beijing
Attendance: 1302
Referees: Bill Kuerzi (USA)

11 September 2008
13:30

Germany	78–72	Sweden
Scoring by quarter: 20-18, 17-21, 17-18, 24-15

National Indoor Stadium, Beijing
Attendance: 7684
Referees: Antonia Gomez Ruf (ESP)

11 September 2008
16:15

Canada	93–62	Iran
Scoring by quarter: 30-16, 22-19, 21-20, 20-7

National Indoor Stadium, Beijing
Attendance: 9780
Referees: Cristian Ariel Salguero (ARG)

=== Group B ===
Team	Pld	W	L	PF	PA	PD	Pts
Australia (Q)	5	4	1	346	291	+55	9
United States (Q)	5	4	1	378	247	+131	9
Great Britain (Q)	5	4	1	334	271	+63	9
Israel (Q)	5	2	3	332	325	+7	7
Brazil	5	1	4	291	348	−57	6
China	5	0	5	203	402	−199	5

Source: Paralympic.org
(Q) Qualified for quarterfinals

Note: All times are local

7 September 2008
13:30

United States	76–53	Israel

National Indoor Stadium, Beijing

7 September 2008
16:15

Australia	73–72	Brazil

National Indoor Stadium, Beijing

7 September 2008
18:30

China	34–81	Great Britain

National Indoor Stadium, Beijing

8 September 2008
10:00

Brazil	41–87	United States

USTB Gymnasium, Beijing

8 September 2008
12:15

Israel	80–41	China

USTB Gymnasium, Beijing

8 September 2008
20:45

Great Britain	48–67	Australia

National Indoor Stadium, Beijing

9 September 2008
9:00

Brazil	60–73	Israel

National Indoor Stadium, Beijing

9 September 2008
11:30

Australia	79–44	China

National Indoor Stadium, Beijing

9 September 2008
20:45

United States	50–54	Great Britain

National Indoor Stadium, Beijing

10 September 2008
15:30

Australia	66–59	Israel

USTB Gymnasium, Beijing

10 September 2008
17:45

China	38–97	United States

USTB Gymnasium, Beijing

10 September 2008
20:45

Great Britain	69–53	Brazil

National Indoor Stadium, Beijing

11 September 2008
10:00

Israel	67–82	Great Britain

USTB Gymnasium, Beijing

11 September 2008
18:30

China	46–65	Brazil

National Indoor Stadium, Beijing

11 September 2008
20:45

United States	68–61	Australia
Scoring by quarter: 24-20, 18-16, 9-21, 17-4

National Indoor Stadium, Beijing
Attendance: 9780
Referees: Juan Manuel Urunuela (ESP)

== Medal Round ==
Iran withdrew because of the possibility of a match against Israel.

Quarterfinals (13 September 2008)
B2	United States	20
A3	Iran	0
A1	Canada	55
B4	Israel	47
B1	Australia	72
A4	Japan	52
A2	Germany	64
B3	Great Britain	71

Semifinals (14 September 2008)
B2	United States	62
A1	Canada	69
B1	Australia	67
B3	Great Britain	54

Gold medal game (16 September 2008)
A1	Canada	60
B1	Australia	72
Bronze medal game
B2	United States	77
B3	Great Britain	85

Source: Paralympic.org

Quarterfinals

13 September 2008
09:00

Iran DNS

United States	20–0	Iran
Pts: - Rebs: - Asts: -		Pts: - Rebs: - Asts: -

National Indoor Stadium, Beijing
Attendance: 12000
Referees: Matias Quintana (ARG)

13 September 2008
11:15

Canada	55–47	Israel
Scoring by quarter: 20-4, 7-10, 14-13, 14-20
Pts: Patrick Anderson 17; Rebs: Joey Johnson 16; Asts: David Durepos4		Pts: Dotan Meishar 15; Rebs: Dotan Meishar 16; Asts: Avraham Lehrman 2

National Indoor Stadium, Beijing
Attendance: 12000
Referees: Gabriele Caligiuri (AUS)

13 September 2008
13:30

Australia	72–52	Japan
Scoring by quarter: 21-15, 17-15, 19-13, 15-9
Pts: Brad Ness 18; Rebs: Brad Ness 14; Asts: Shaun Norris 4		Pts: Kazuyuki Kyoya, Tetsuya Miyajima 9 Rebs: Akimasa Suzuki, Shingo Fujii 6 Asts: Hiroaki Kozai 3

National Indoor Stadium, Beijing
Attendance: 12000
Referees: Edwin Frank Wallaart (NED)

13 September 2008
16:45

Germany	64–71	Great Britain
Scoring by quarter: 17-21, 13-17, 14-20, 20-13
Pts: Dirk Kohler-Lenz 18; Rebs: Dirk Kohler-Lenz 11; Asts: Lars Christink 5		Pts: Simon Munn 31; Rebs: Simon Munn 20; Asts: Jon Pollock 8

National Indoor Stadium, Beijing
Attendance: 12000
Referees: Bill Kuerzi (USA)

Semifinals

14 September 2008
21:30

United States	62–69 (OT)	Canada
Scoring by quarter: 15-25, 8-10, 14-10, 12-4, Overtime: 20-13
Pts: Patrick Anderson 33; Rebs: Patrick Anderson 21; Asts: Patrick Anderson 6		Pts: Joe Chambers 14; Rebs: Joe Chambers 10; Asts: Paul Schulte 6

National Indoor Stadium, Beijing
Attendance: 12000
Referees: Max Kindervater (GER)

14 September 2008
19:00

Great Britain	54–67	Australia
Scoring by quarter: 6-19, 14-17, 13-18, 21-13
Pts: Jon Pollock 18; Rebs: Simon Munn 11; Asts: Jon Pollock 3		Pts: Justin Eveson 22; Rebs: Brad Ness 11; Asts: Justin Eveson 2

National Indoor Stadium, Beijing
Attendance: 12000
Referees: Juan Manuel Urunuela (ESP)

Bronze medal game

16 September 2008
17:00

United States	77–85	Great Britain
Scoring by quarter: 14-18, 22-19, 11-24, 30-24
Pts: Joe Chambers 25; Rebs: Joe Chambers 6 Asts: Mikey Paye, Jeremy Lade 3		Pts: Terence Bywater 32; Rebs: Simon Munn 13; Asts: Jon Pollock 5

National Indoor Stadium, Beijing
Attendance: 12000
Referees: Max Kindervater (GER)

Gold medal game

16 September 2008
19:30

Canada	60–72	Australia
Scoring by quarter: 17-16, 15-12, 15-26, 13-18
Pts: Patrick Anderson 22; Rebs: Patrick Anderson, Joey Johnson 12; Asts: Patrick Anderson 6		Pts: Troy Sachs 19; Rebs: Troy Sachs, Justin Eveson 7 Asts: Brad Ness 8

National Indoor Stadium, Beijing
Attendance: 12000
Referees: Edwin Frank Wallaart (NED)

== Classification 5-8 ==
Classification round
15 September 2008
Iran	0
Israel	20
15 September 2008
Japan	57
Germany	71

Fifth place
16 September 2008
Israel	54
Germany	63
Third place
16 September 2008
Iran	0
Japan	20

Source: Paralympic.org

Classification

15 September 2008

Iran DNS

Iran	0–20	Israel
Pts: - Rebs: - Asts: -		Pts: - Rebs: - Asts: -

National Indoor Stadium, Beijing

15 September 2008
11:15

Germany	71–57	Japan
Scoring by quarter: 16-16, 21-11, 12-16, 22-14
Pts: Dirk Passiwan 30; Rebs: Dirk Kohler-Lenz 14; Asts: Lars Lehmann 8		Pts: Reo Fujimoto 20; Rebs: Akimasa Suzuki 7 Asts: Shingo Fujii 3

National Indoor Stadium, Beijing
Attendance: 12000
Referees: Bill Kuerzi (USA)

Fifth place

16 September 2008

Israel	54–63	Germany
Scoring by quarter: 17-19, 13-14, 12-12, 12-18
Pts: Dotan Meishar 19; Rebs: Dotan Meishar 14; Asts: Roei Rozenberg, Liran Hendel 7		Pts: Dirk Passiwan 22; Rebs: Dirk Kohler-Lenz 10; Asts: Lars Lehmann 4

National Indoor Stadium, Beijing
Attendance: 11204
Referees: Jonathon Blake Burford (USA)

Seventh place

16 September 2008

Iran DNS

Iran	0–20	Japan
Pts: - Rebs: - Asts: -		Pts: - Rebs: - Asts: -

National Indoor Stadium, Beijing

== Classification 9-12 ==
Classification round
12 September 2008
Brazil	75
Sweden	56
12 September 2008
South Africa	67
China	60

Ninth place
16 September 2008
Brazil	68
South Africa	46
Third place
14 September 2008
Sweden	63
China	45

Source: Paralympic.org

Classification

12 September 2008
09:00

Brazil	75–56	Sweden
Scoring by quarter: 25-11, 16-12, 16-16, 18-17
Pts: Jose Marcos Silva 20; Rebs: Leandro Mirando 17; Asts: Everaldo Lima 6		Pts: Peter Kohlstrom 20; Rebs: Joachim Gustavsson 5 Asts: Joakim Linden, Robin Meng 2

National Indoor Stadium, Beijing
Attendance: 8854
Referees: Sebastien Gauthier (CAN)

12 September 2008
11:15

South Africa	67–60	China
Scoring by quarter: 13-14, 19-15, 19-27, 16-4
Pts: Richard Nortje 22; Rebs: David Nathaniel Curle 10; Asts: David Nathaniel Curle 5		Pts: Hai Ding 20; Rebs: Hai Ding 15; Asts: Lei Yang, Pengcheng Li 4

National Indoor Stadium, Beijing
Attendance: 8854
Referees: Jonathon Blake Burford (USA)

Ninth place

16 September 2008
11:15

Brazil	68–46	South Africa
Scoring by quarter: 19-17, 18-11, 19-9, 12-9
Pts: Jose Marcos Silva 18; Rebs: Leandro Mirando 11; Asts: Everaldo Lima 3		Pts: Richard Nortje 18; Rebs: Richard Nortje 6 Asts: Nicholas Taylor, Jeremy Nel 2

National Indoor Stadium, Beijing
Attendance: 11204
Referees: Bill Kuerzi (USA)

Eleventh place

14 September 2008
15:45

Sweden	63–45	China
Scoring by quarter: 16-13, 17-17, 14-13, 16-2
Pts: Hussein Haidari 19; Rebs: Hussein Haidari 14; Asts: Hussein Haidari 10		Pts: Hai Ding 14; Rebs: Hai Ding 9 Asts: Haijiang Chen 3

National Indoor Stadium, Beijing
Attendance: 12000
Referees: Jorg-Ulrich Otto (GER)

== Ranking ==
Place	Team
1st place, gold medalist(s)	Australia
2nd place, silver medalist(s)	Canada
3rd place, bronze medalist(s)	Great Britain
4.	United States
5.	Germany
6.	Israel
7.	Japan
8.	Iran
9.	Brazil
10.	South Africa
11.	Sweden
12.	China
