= Great Britain men's national wheelchair basketball team =

British sports team

Great Britain
- National federation: British Wheelchair Basketball

Paralympic Games
- Appearances: 13
- Medals: Silver: 1960, 1964, 1996, 2024; Bronze: 1960, 1968, 2004, 2008, 2016, 2020

World Championships
- Appearances: 14
- Medals: Gold: 1973, 2018; Silver: 1994, 2002, 2022; Bronze: 1975, 2026
Home	Away

The Great Britain men's national wheelchair basketball team is the men's wheelchair basketball side that represents Great Britain in international competitions.

Great Britain has competed at every men's wheelchair basketball tournament at the Paralympic Games since the first tournament in 1960.

== Competitions ==
=== Summer Paralympics ===
Year	Position	W	L
(Italy) 1960	A - (silver)	?	?
(Italy) 1960	B - (bronze)	?	?
(Japan) 1964	A - (silver)	?	?
(Japan) 1964	B - ?	?	?
(Israel) 1968	3rd place, bronze medalist(s)	?	?
(Germany) 1972	4th	?	?
(Canada) 1976	?	?	?
(Netherlands) 1980	12th	?	?
(United States) 1984	?	?	?
(South Korea) 1988	11th	?	?
(Spain) 1992	6th	?	?
(United States) 1996	2nd place, silver medalist(s)	5	3
(Australia) 2000	4th	4	4
(Greece) 2004	3rd place, bronze medalist(s)	4	4
(China) 2008	3rd place, bronze medalist(s)	6	2
(United Kingdom) 2012	4th	4	4
(Brazil) 2016	3rd place, bronze medalist(s)	6	2
Total	?/16	?	?

=== European Championship ===
Year	Position	W	L
(Belgium) 1970	3rd place, bronze medalist(s)	?	?
(France) 1971	1st place, gold medalist(s)	?	?
(France) 1974	1st place, gold medalist(s)	?	?
(Spain) 1991	3rd place, bronze medalist(s)	?	?
(Germany) 1993	2nd place, silver medalist(s)	?	?
(France) 1995	1st place, gold medalist(s)	?	?
(Spain) 1997	2nd place, silver medalist(s)	?	?
(Netherlands) 1999	4th	?	?
(Netherlands) 2001–02	4th	?	?
(Italy) 2003	3rd place, bronze medalist(s)	?	?
(France) 2005	2nd place, silver medalist(s)	?	?
(Germany) 2007	2nd place, silver medalist(s)	?	?
(Turkey) 2009	3rd place, bronze medalist(s)	?	?
(Israel) 2011	1st place, gold medalist(s)	?	?
(Germany) 2013	1st place, gold medalist(s)	8	0
(United Kingdom) 2015	1st place, gold medalist(s)	6	2
(Spain) 2017	2nd place, silver medalist(s)	6	2
(Netherlands) 2019	1st place, gold medalist(s)	8	0
(Spain) 2021	2nd place, silver medalist(s)	7	1
(Netherlands) 2023	1st place, gold medalist(s)	8	0
Total	20/23	45	5

== Past rosters ==
- 2010 World Championship: finished 6th among 10 teams

#4 Gaz Choudhry, #5 Simon Brown, #6 Kevin Hayes, #7 Terry Bywater, #8 Simon Munn, #9 Jon Pollock, #10 Abdi Jama, #11 Matt Sealy, #12 Ian Sagar, #13 Daniel Highcock, #14 Jon Hall, #15 Ade Orogbemi, (Coach: Murray Treseder)

- 2008 Paralympic Games: finished 3rd among 12 teams

Ade Orogbemi, Andrew Blake, Kevin Hayes, Matthew Byrne, Simon Brown, Peter Finbow, Joseph Bestwick, Jonathan Hall, Abdillah Jama, Terence Bywater, Jon Pollock, Simon Munn

- 2004 Paralympic Games: finished 3rd among 12 teams

Matt Byrne, Andrew Blake, Peter Finbow, Colin Price, Stuart Jellows, Ade Adepitan, Jonathan Pollock, Simon Munn, Terry Bywater, Kevin Hayes, Fred Howley, Sinclair Thomas

== See also ==
- Great Britain national basketball team
