= Turkey men's national wheelchair basketball team =

Turkey
- IWBF zone: IWBF Europe
- National federation: Turkish Basketball Federation (TBF)
- Coach: (Turkey) Tacettin Çıpa
- Nickname(s): 12 Cesur Yürek (12 Brave Hearts)

Paralympic Games
- Appearances: 2

World Championships
- Appearances: 2
- Medals: (bronze) 2014

European Championships
- Appearances: 5
- Medals: 2017; 2015; 2013; 2009
Home	Away

The Turkey men's national wheelchair basketball team is the wheelchair basketball side that represents Turkey in international competitions for men. The team is nicknamed "12 Cesur Yürek" (literally "12 Brave Hearts").

== History ==
The national team won a bronze medal (2014) at the Wheelchair Basketball World Championship and became three times runner-up (2009, 2013, 2015) and once champion (2017) at the European Wheelchair Basketball Championship.

== Current roster ==
Team roster at the Wheelchair basketball at the 2016 Summer Paralympics:

Staff
Head coach	(Turkey) Tacettin Çıpa
Assistant coach	(Turkey) Ahmet Akın
Assistant coach	(Turkey) Ali Arda Öztürk

#	Name	Date of birth and age	Class.	Pos.	Club
1	Kaan Kemal Şafak	May 1, 1993 (age 33)	4.0	PG	TSK Karagücü SK
3	Kaan Dalay	July 26, 1981 (age 45)	2.0	SG	Beşiktaş JK
5	Özgür Gürbulak (C)	April 30, 1981 (age 45)	4.0	F	Beşiktaş JK
7	Uğur Toprak	July 19, 1992 (age 34)	3.0	SG	Balıkesir BBSK
9	Deniz Acar	January 9, 1976 (age 50)	2.5	F	Beşiktaş JK
10	Cem Gezinci	September 1, 1985 (age 41)	4.5	F	Beşiktaş JK
11	Fikri Gündoğdu	June 15, 1985 (age 41)	1.0	SG	Galatasaray SK
13	Yasin Cırgaoğlu	July 27, 1985 (age 41)		PF	Beşiktaş JK
15	Selim Sayak	January 26, 1983 (age 43)		SG	Kardemir Karabükspor
35	Ferit Gümüş	January 1, 1981 (age 45)	3.0	SG	Beşiktaş JK
77	İsmail Ar	October 28, 1985 (age 41)	1.5	F	Galatasaray SK
99	İbrahim Yavuz	October 14, 1986 (age 40)	4.0	SG	KKTCell SK

== Competitions ==
=== European Championship ===
Year	Position	W	L
(Turkey) 2009	2nd place, silver medalist(s)	4	4
(Israel) 2011	5th	6	2
(Germany) 2013	2nd place, silver medalist(s)	7	1
(United Kingdom) 2015	2nd place, silver medalist(s)	7	1
(Spain) 2017	1st place, gold medalist(s)	8	0
(Poland) 2019	3rd place, bronze medalist(s)	6	2
(Spain) 2021	12th		
Total	6/24	38	10

=== World Championship ===
Year	Position	W	L
(United Kingdom) 2010	8th	2	6
(South Korea) 2014	3rd place, bronze medalist(s)	5	4
(Germany) 2018	8th	2	5
Total	3/13	9	15

=== Paralympics ===
Year	Position	W	L
(United Kingdom) 2012	7th	4	4
(Brazil) 2016	4th	5	3
(Japan) 2020	6th	3	4
Total	3/14	12	11

== Past Rosters ==
- 2017 European Championship: finished champion among 12 teams

#1 Deniz Acar, #3 Kaan Dalay, #5 Özgür Gürbulak, #9 Uğur Toprak, #10 Cem Gezinci, #11 Fikri Gündoğdu, #15 Selim Sayak, #35 Ferit Gümüş, #55 Murat Aeslanoğlu, #61 Metin Bahçekapılı, #77 İsmail Ar, #99 |İbrahim Yavuz, Coach: (Turkey) Tacettin Çıpa.

== Turkey men's junior national wheelchair basketball team ==
=== Current roster ===
This is the roster for the 2017 IWBF Men's U22 Wheelchair Basketball European Championship:

Head Coach: (Turkey) Mahmut Kemal Okur
Assistant Coach: (Turkey) Caner Cesur
Physiotherapist: (Turkey) Ali Imran Yalçın
Mechanic: (Turkey) Haluk Taşınçay
Companion: (Turkey) Gülcan Girgin

#	Name	Class
4	Gürkan Taş	2.0
5	Halil İbrahim Bağlı	3.5
6	Mücahit Günaydın	4.0
7	Ahmet Efetürk	4.0
8	Burak Şrn	1.5
9	Dilara Barın Girgin	1.0
10	Enes Bulut	4.0
11	Volkan Gülem	2.0
12	Ali Kabakülekler	1.0
13	Mevlüt Erdenci	4.0
14	Ebu Bekir Kabakülekler	1.0
15	Ahmet Umut Can Dolaşan	3.5

=== IWBF U23 World Wheelchair Basketball Championship ===
Year	Position	W	L
(Canada) 1997	Did not participate		
(Brazil) 2001	Did not participate		
(United Kingdom) 2005	10th		
(France) 2009	5th		
(Turkey) 2013	7th	5	3
(Canada) 2017	2nd place, silver medalist(s)		

== See also ==
- Turkey women's national wheelchair basketball team
