= Wheelchair basketball at the 1984 Summer Paralympics =

Wheelchair basketball at the VII Paralympic Games
- Paralympic Wheelchair Basketball

Medalists
1st place, gold medalist(s)		France (FRA) (men); West Germany (FRG) (women)
2nd place, silver medalist(s)		Netherlands (NED) (men); Israel (ISR) (women)
3rd place, bronze medalist(s)		Sweden (SWE) (men); Japan (JPN) (women)

Paralympic symbol (1988–1994)

Wheelchair basketball at the 1984 Summer Paralympics consisted of men's and women's team events.

== Medal summary ==
Event	Gold	Silver	Bronze
Men's team	France (FRA) Philippe Baye; Eric Benault; Andre Chauve; Maurice Claeys; Michel Gradelle; Marc Guillemain; Michel Izanic; Pascal Kaczmarcyk; Dominique Marchegiani; Celestin Parsemain; Jean-Yves Regnault; Jean-Jacques Reigni	Netherlands (NED) Bob van der Broeck; Jan Dijs; Ron van Gelderen; Ben Klerks; Henk Makkenze; Bert van der Sommen; Frits Streyl; Peter van Velzen; Harrie Venema; Frits Wiegmann	Sweden (SWE) Nils Ander; Lars-Gunnar Andersson; Lars Arkestedt; Gunnar Berglund; Sven Engbusk; Gunnar Jangbring; Bengt-Gosta Johansson; Rolf Johansson; Jan Lindholm; Lars Lofstrom; Bengt-Gosta Nystrom; Tommy Olsson
Women's team	West Germany (FRG)	Israel (ISR)	Japan (JPN)

Source: Paralympic.org

== See also ==
- Basketball at the 1984 Summer Olympics
