= Canada men's national wheelchair basketball team =

Canada
- IWBF Ranking: 1st
- IWBF zone: Americas
- National federation: Wheelchair Basketball Canada

Paralympic Games
- Appearances: 10
Home	Away
Medal record
Paralympic Games
Gold medal – first place	2000 Sydney	Men's wheelchair basketball
Gold medal – first place	2004 Athens	Men's wheelchair basketball
Silver medal – second place	2008 Beijing	Men's wheelchair basketball
Gold medal – first place	2012 London	Men's wheelchair basketball
World Wheelchair Basketball Championships
Gold medal – first place	2006 Amsterdam	Men
Silver medal – second place	1986 Melbourne	Men
Bronze medal – third place	1990 Bruges	Men
Bronze medal – third place	1994 Edmonton	Men
Bronze medal – third place	1998 Sydney	Men
Bronze medal – third place	2002 Kitakyushu	Men

The Canada men's national wheelchair basketball team is one of Canada's most successful paralympic sporting teams. It is the only national men's wheelchair basketball team to have won two consecutive gold medals at the Paralympic Games in 2000 and 2004, and the only one to have won three paralympic titles. It also won World Wheelchair Basketball Championships in 2006 and was runner-up in 1986.
