= Australia men's national wheelchair basketball team =

Australia
- IWBF zone: Asia Oceania
- National federation: Basketball Australia
- Coach: Brad Ness
- Nickname: Rollers

Paralympic Games
- Appearances: 17
- Medals: Gold: 1996, 2008; Silver: 2004, 2012

World Championships
- Appearances: 12
- Medals: Gold: 2010, 2014,2026; Bronze: 2006, 2018
Home	Away

The Australia men's national wheelchair basketball team is the men's wheelchair basketball side that represents Australia in international competitions. The team is known as the Rollers. Australia took the gold medal at the 1996 Atlanta Paralympic Games and 2008 Beijing Paralympic Games.

Australia has competed at every men's wheelchair basketball tournament at the Paralympic Games except 1964. Kevin Coombs was Australia's first captain of the men's wheelchair basketball team.

The Rollers qualified for the 2016 Summer Paralympics by winning the 2015 Asia Oceania Qualifying Tournament and finished sixth.

== Competitions ==
=== Summer Paralympics ===
Year	Position	W	L
(Italy) 1960	?	?	?
(Japan) 1964	Did not compete		
(Israel) 1968	9th	?	?
(Germany) 1972	5th	?	?
(Canada) 1976	10th	?	?
(Netherlands) 1980	13th	?	?
(United States) 1984	11th	?	?
(South Korea) 1988	10th	?	?
(Spain) 1992	8th	?	?
(United States) 1996	1st place, gold medalist(s)	7	1
(Australia) 2000	5th	5	3
(Greece) 2004	2nd place, silver medalist(s)	6	2
(China) 2008	1st place, gold medalist(s)	7	1
(United Kingdom) 2012	2nd place, silver medalist(s)	7	1
(Brazil) 2016	6th	5	2
(Japan) 2020	5th	4	3
(France) 2024	5th	2	4

=== Performance in Gold Cup / World Championships ===
- 1973 – did not participate
- 1975 – did not participate
- 1979 – did not participate
- 1983 – 11th
- 1986 – 10th
- 1990 – 6th
- 1994 – 6th
- 1998 – 4th
- 2002 – 4th
- 2006 – Bronze
- 2010 – Gold
- 2014 – Gold
- 2018 – Bronze
- 2022 – 7th
- 2026 – Gold

== Past Paralympic Games Rosters ==
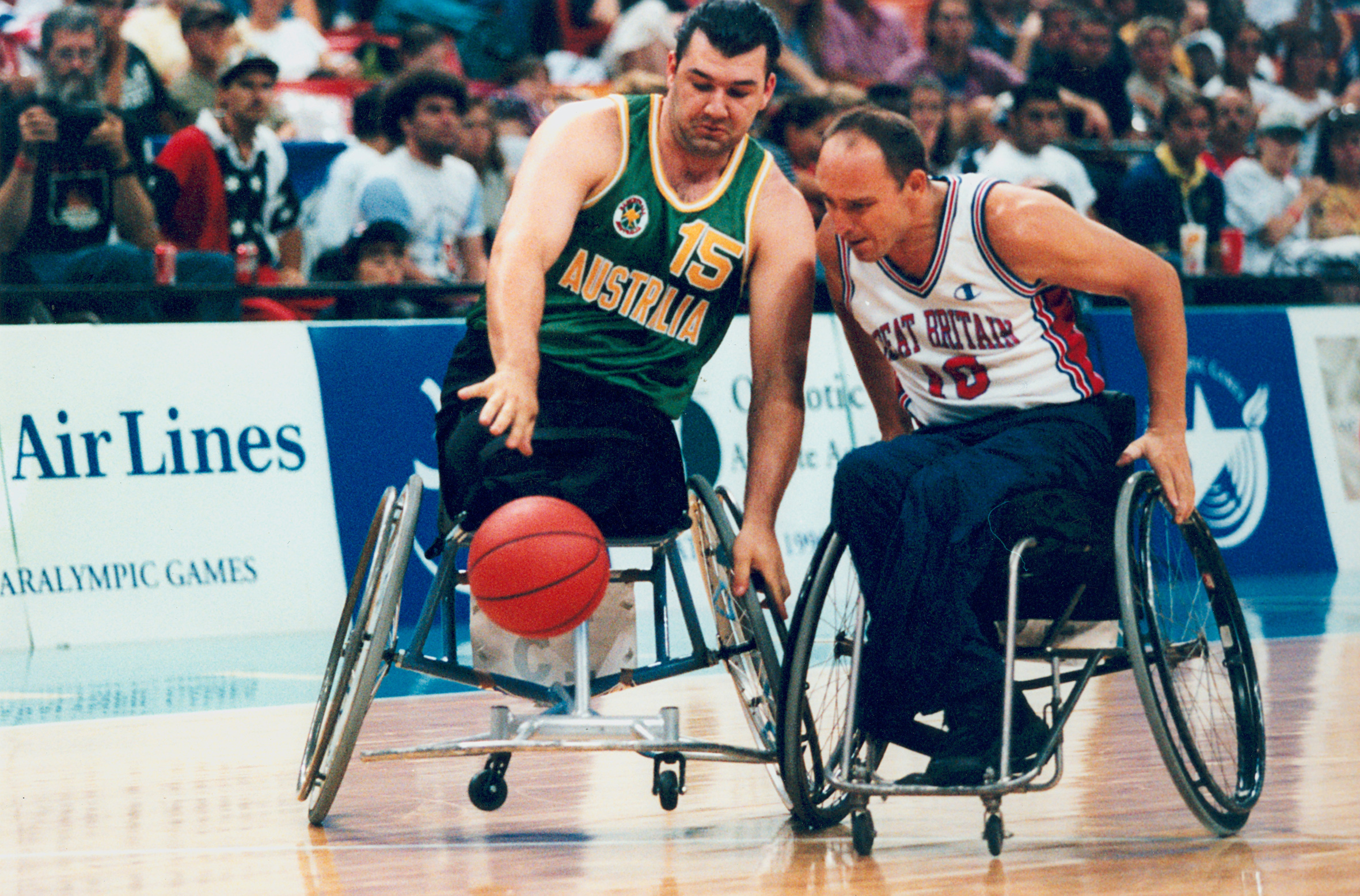
Australian wheelchair basketballer Orfeo Cecconato takes on a Great Britain defender in the final of the men's wheelchair basketball tournament at the 1996 Atlanta Paralympic Games

=== 1960 Summer Paralympics ===
- Team members – Men – John Turich (captain), Roger Cockerill, Kevin Coombs, Chris O'Brien, Kevin Cunningham, Gary Hooper, Bill Mather-Brown, Bruno Moretti, Frank Ponta

Results included: Israel d Australia 22–5; Australia d Belgium 26–0; United States d Australia 32–10. Results may be incomplete.

=== 1964 Summer Paralympics ===
Australia did not field a team at the 1964 Summer Paralympics.

=== 1968 Summer Paralympics ===
Finished 9th among 13 teams.

- Team members – Kevin Bawden, Peter Burt, Brian Chambers, Kevin Cunningham, Kevin Coombs, Bill Mather-Brown, John Martin, Robert McIntyre, Bruno Moretti, Frank Ponta, Noel Simmons, Dom Watts

=== 1972 Summer Paralympics ===
Finished 8th among 9 teams.
In the preliminary rounds, Australian results were: United States 85 v Australia 29; Israel 101 v Australia 36; France 74 v Australia 53. Australia finished 8th in the tournament.

- Team members – Brian Chambers, Kevin Coombs, Terry Giddy, John Martin, Robert McIntyre, Hugh Patterson, Frank Ponta, Victor Salvemini

=== 1976 Summer Paralympics ===
'Finished 10th among 21 teams
Australian results: Sweden 79 v Australia 51, Belgium 43 v Australia 30, United States 93 v Australia 34, Australia 57 v Japan 42. Australia did not qualify for the finals.

- Team members – Kevin Bawden, John Kidd, Stan Kosmala, Ray Letheby, John Martin, Robert McIntyre, Richard Oliver, Frank Ponta, Eric Russell, Victor Salvemini Coach – Les Mathews.

=== 1980 Summer Paralympics ===
Finished 13th among 17 teams

- Team members – Rene Ahrens, Robert Augustine, Kevin Bishop, Peter Burt, Kevin Coombs, Len Ettridge, Erich Hubel, Robert McIntyre, Brian McNicholl, Kevin Munro, Richard Oliver, Fred Pointer

=== 1984 Summer Paralympics ===
Finished 11th among 18 teams

- Team members – Michael Callahan, Kevin Coombs, David Gould, Erich Hubel, Ch. Ikstrum, Michael McFawn, Nick Morozoff, Richard Oliver, P. Peterson, M. Pope; Coach – Bruno Moretti

=== 1988 Summer Paralympics ===
Finished 10th among 17 teams

- Team members – Troy Andrews, Sandy Blythe, Stuart Ewin, David Gould, Michael Haughey, Gerry Hewson, Erich Hubel, Michael McFawn, Richard Oliver, Christopher Sparks, Stephen Trestrail, Michael Walker

=== 1992 Summer Paralympics ===
Finished 9th among 12 teams

- Team members – Troy Andrews, Sandy Blythe, Michael Callahan, Stuart Ewin, David Gould, Gerry Hewson, Errol Hyde, Timothy Maloney, Richard Oliver, Troy Sachs, Stephen Trestrail, Michael Walker; Coach – Michael Tucker Official – Graham Gould (escort)

=== 1996 Summer Paralympics ===
Finished 1st among 12 teams.
The team beat Great Britain for the gold medal with a final score 78:63.

- Team members – Troy Andrews, Sandy Blythe, Orfeo Cecconato, Ben Cox, Stuart Ewin, David Gould, Gerard Hewson, Timothy Maloney, Nicholas Morris, Richard Oliver, David Selby, Troy Sachs; Coaches Mark Walker (head coach), Evan Bennett (assistant coach) Graham Gould (Mechanic/Operations)

Detailed Results – Wheelchair basketball at the 1996 Summer Paralympics – Men

=== 2000 Summer Paralympics ===
Finished 5th among 12 teams

- Team members – Troy Andrews, Sandy Blythe, David Gould, Shaun Groenewegen, Gerry Hewson, Adrian King, Michael McFawn, Nick Morris, Brad Ness, Shane Porter, Brook Quinn, Troy Sachs Coaches – Bob Turner (Head), Michael Walker, Richard Oliver Officials – Fred Heidt (manager), John Camens, Graham Gould

Detailed Results – Wheelchair basketball at the 2000 Summer Paralympics – Men

=== 2004 Summer Paralympics ===
Finished 2nd among 12 teams.
The Australians were beaten by Canada 53:70 in the Gold Medal match.

- Team members – David Selby, Grant Mizens, Campbell Message, Brendan Dowler, Brad Ness, Adrian King, Daryl Taylor, Andrew Flavel, Shaun Norris, Tristan Knowles, Troy Sachs, Justin Eveson; Coaches – Bernard Treseder (Head), Alan Cox (Assistant), Craig Friday (Assistant Technical); Officials – Kelvin Browner (manager)

Detailed Results – Wheelchair basketball at the 2004 Summer Paralympics – Men

=== 2008 Summer Paralympics ===
Finished 1st among 12 teams.
The team beat Canada 72:60 in the Final

- Team members – Justin Eveson, Tige Simmons, Grant Mizens, Michael Hartnett, Brendan Dowler, Dylan Alcott, Adrian King, Brett Stibners, Tristan Knowles, Troy Sachs, Shaun Norris, Brad Ness; Coaches- – Ben Ettridge, Craig Friday (Assistant); Officials – Kevin Browner (Section Manager), Ian Lowther (physiotherapist)

Detailed Results – Wheelchair basketball at the 2008 Summer Paralympics – Men

=== 2012 Summer Paralympics ===
Finished 2nd among 12 teams.
The team was defeated by Canada 58:64 in the Gold Medal match.

- Team members – Justin Eveson (4.5), Bill Latham (4.0), Brett Stibners (4.0), Shaun Norris (3.0), Michael Hartnett (1.0), Tristan Knowles (4.0), Jannik Blair (1.0), Tige Simmons (1.0), *Grant Mizens (2.0), Dylan Alcott (1.0), Nick Taylor (2.0), Brad Ness (4.5); Coaches – Ben Ettridge (head coach), Matteo Feriani (assistant coach), Tom Kyle (assistant coach)

Detailed Results – Wheelchair basketball at the 2012 Summer Paralympics – Men

=== 2016 Summer Paralympics ===
Finished 6th among 12 teams.

- Team members - Josh Allison (d), Jannik Blair, Adam Deans (d), Tristan Knowles, Bill Latham, Matthew McShane (d), Brad Ness, Shaun Norris, Tom O'Neill-Thorne (d), Shawn Russell (d), Tige Simmons, Brett Stibners; Coaches – Ben Ettridge (head coach), Luke Brennan (Assistant), Tom Kyle (assistant coach), Jeremy Synot (video coach); Program Manager – Leigh Gooding; Health Coordinator & Team Physiotherapist – Jesse Adams

Detailed Results – Wheelchair basketball at the 2016 Summer Paralympics

=== 2020 Summer Paralympics ===
Finished 5th among 12 teams.

- Team members - Michael Auprince, Jannik Blair, Tristan Knowles, Bill Latham, Matthew McShane, John McPhail (d), Shaun Norris, Tom O'Neill-Thorne, Kim Robins (d), Brett Stibners, Jeremy Tyndall (d), Samuel White (d) Coaches – Craig Friday (head coach), Grant Mizens (Assistant), Brad Ness (Assistant), Shane Furness (Assistant); Program Manager – Leigh Gooding; Team Manager - Priyanka Karunakaran; Physiotherapist - Ryan Campbell

Detailed Results – Wheelchair basketball at the 2020 Summer Paralympics

=== 2024 Summer Paralympics ===
Finished 5th among 8 teams.

- Team members Samuel White, Frank Pinder, Jaylen Brown (d), Eithen Leard (d), Bill Latham, Shaun Norris, Tristan Knowles, Jannik Blair, Tom O'Neill-Thorne, Luke Pople (d), Tom McHugh, Phil Evans (d); Coaches - Brad Ness (Head coach), Brett Stibners (Assistant), Darren Allie (Assistant), Luke Mitchell (Assistant)

Detailed Results – Wheelchair basketball at the 2024 Summer Paralympics

(d) Paralympic Games debut

== Past Gold Cup / World Championships Games Rosters ==
World Championships from 1973 to 2002, known as Gold Cup.

=== 1983 Gold Cup ===
Finished 11th

- Team members – Kevin Bishop, Ron Burgers, Michael Callahan, Kevin Coombs (Capt.), Erich Hubel, Errol Hyde, Charles Ikstrums, Robert MacIntyre, Michel McFawn, Richard Oliver, Peter Petersen, Mark Pope; Coaches – Bruno Moretti (head coach), Charles Ryan (assistant coach)

=== 1986 Gold Cup ===
Finished 10th

- Team members – Kevin Bishop, Michael Callahan, David Gould, Erich Hubel, Errol Hyde, Eric Klein, Michael McFawn, Robert McIntyre, Michael Nugent, Richard Oliver, Chris Sparks, Steven Trestrail; Coaches – Charles Ryan (head coach), Kevin Bawden (assistant coach)

=== 1990 Gold Cup ===
Finished 5th

- Team members – Troy Andrews, Sandy Blythe, Michael Callahan, Stewart Ewin, David Gould, Gerry Hewson, Steve Lazarakes, Tim Maloney, Richard Oliver, Chris Sparks, Paul Stitt, Michael Walker; Coach – Michael Tucker

=== 1994 Gold Cup ===
Finished 6th

- Team members – Troy Andrews, Sandy Blythe, Orfeo Cecconato, Michael McFawn, David Gould, Gerry Hewson, Tim Maloney, Nick Morris, Richard Oliver, Dion Reneti, Troy Sachs, Stephen Trestrail; Coach – Michael Tucker

=== 1998 Gold Cup ===
Finished 4th

- Team members – Troy Andrews, Sandy Blythe, Orfeo Cecconato, David Gould, Gerry Hewson, Tim Maloney, Mick McFawn, Campbell Message, Nick Morris, Brook Quinn, Troy Sachs, Steve Trestrail; Coaches – Bob Turner (head coach), Richard Oliver (assistant coach)

=== 2002 Gold Cup ===
Finished 2nd

- Team members – Troy Andrews, Sandy Blythe, Brendan Dowler, Justin Eveson, David Gould, Shaun Groenewegen, Adrian King, Grant Mizens, Brad Ness, Troy Sachs, David Selby, Darryl Taylor ' Coaches – Murray Treseder (head coach), Alan Cox (assistant coach), Craig Friday (assistant coach)

=== 2006 World Championships ===
Finished 3rd

- Team members – Justin Eveson, Brett Stibners, Tristan Knowles, Shaun Norris, Andrew Flavell, Darryl Taylor, Adrian King, Tige Simmons, Jace Claree, Shaun Groenewegen, Brendan Dowler, Brad Ness; Coaches – Murray Treseder (head coach), Mal Keene (assistant coach); Officials – Kelvin Browner (manager), Ian Lowther (physiotherapist).

=== 2010 World Championships ===
Finished 1st

- Team members -Justin Eveson (4.5), Bill Latham (4.0), Brett Stibners (4.0), Shaun Norris (3.0), Michael Hartnett (1.0), Tristan Knowles (4.0), John McPhail (1.0), Tige Simmons (1.0), Grant Mizens (2.0), Dylan Alcott (1.0), Jeremy Doyle (1.0), Brad Ness (4.5); Coaches – Ben Ettridge (head coach), Craig Friday (assistant coach), Tom Kyle (assistant coach); Officials – Leigh Gooding (manager), Jesse Adams (physiotherapist), Jo Vaile (Physiologist)

=== 2014 World Championships ===
Finished 1st

- Team members – Joshua Allison, Jannik Blair, Adam Deans, Justin Eveson, Michael Hartnett, Tristan Knowles, Bill Latham, Brad Ness, Shaun Norris, Tom O'Neill-Thorne, Luke Pople, Nick Taylor; Coaches – Ben Ettridge (head coach), Craig Friday (assistant coach), Luke Brennan (assistant coach); Officials – Leigh Gooding (team manager), Jesse Adams (physiotherapist), Jo Vaile (Recover Specialist)

=== 2018 World Championships ===
Finished 3rd

- Team members – Michael Auprince, Jannik Blair, Steven Elliott, Tristan Knowles, Bill Latham, Matthew McShane, Shaun Norris, Tom O'Neill-Thorne, Luke Pople, Kim Robbins, Brett Stibners, Sam White; Coaches – Craig Friday (head coach), Brad Ness (assistant coach), Grant Mizens (Technical / Specialist Coach); Officials – Jesse Adams (physiotherapist), Peta Forsyth (Physiologist), Priyanka Karunakaran (team manager)

=== 2022 World Championships ===
Finished 7th

- Team members - Jannik Blair, Andrew Dewberry, Tristan Knowles, Bill Latham, Eithen Leard, Clarence McCathy-Grogan, Shaun Norris, Tom O'Neill-Thorne, Frank Pinder, Kim Robbins, Shaun Russell, Sam White; Coaches – Craig Friday (head coach), Grant Mizens (head assistant coach), Brad Ness (assistant coach), Shane Furness (technical assistant)

=== 2026 World Championships ===
Finished

- Team members - Jaylen Brown, Jontee Brown, Steven Elliott, Phil Evans, Tristan Knowles, Bill Latham, Eithen Leard, Luke Pople, Tom O'Neill-Thorne, Frank Pinder,Jeremy Tyndall, Sam White; Coaches – Brad Ness (head coach), Brett Stibners (assistant coach), Darren Allie (assistant coach), Shane Furness (technical assistant)

== See also ==
- Australia men's national basketball team
- Australia women's national wheelchair basketball team
