= Shawn Russell =

Australian wheelchair basketball player

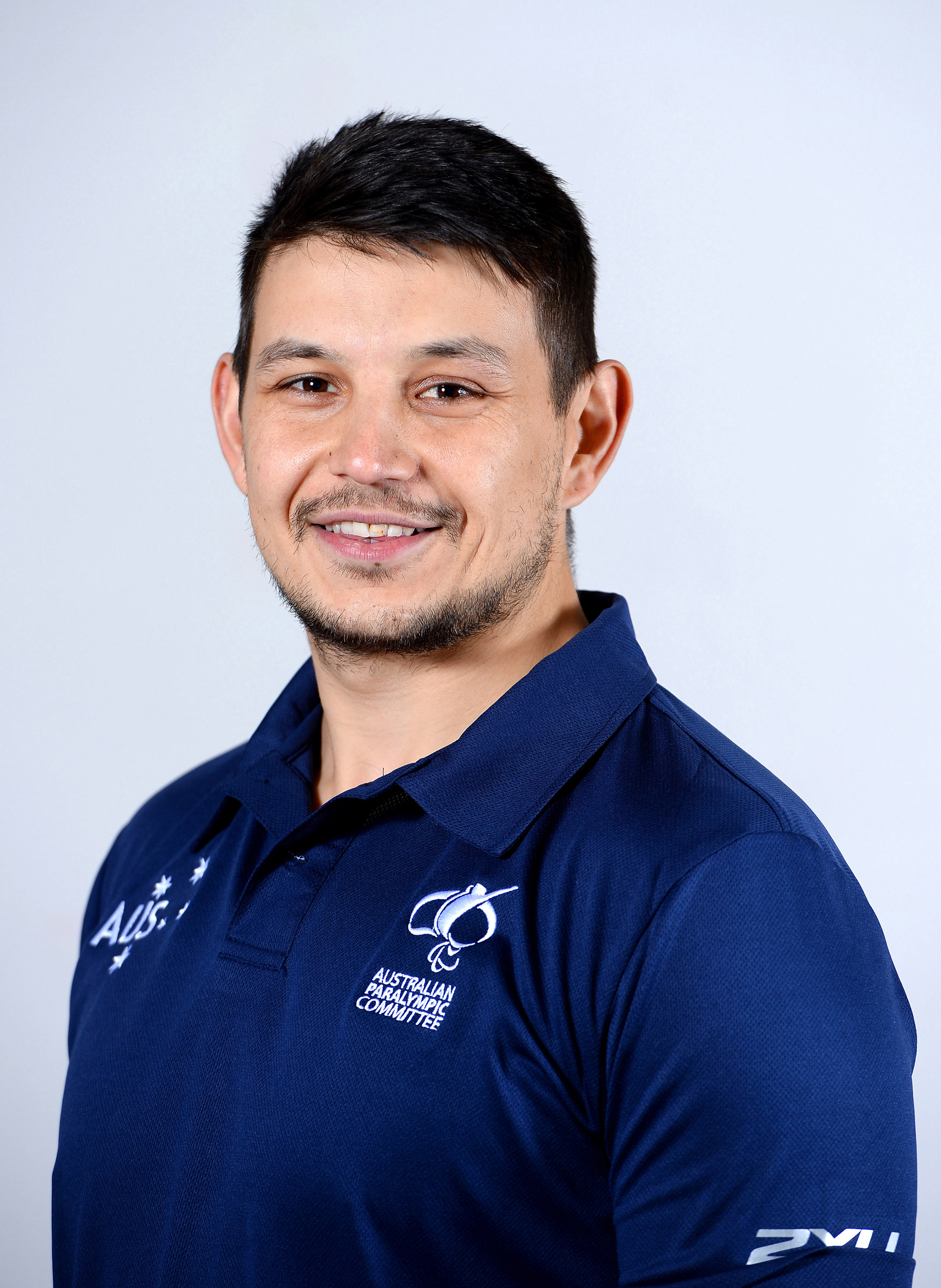
- Portrait of Shawn Russell taken at team processing session for shadow members of 2016 Australian Paralympic team

Personal information
- Nickname: Huss
- Nationality: Australia
- Born: 15 June 1987 (age 39)

Sport
- Position: Forward
- Disability class: 4.0
- Club: Wollongong Roller Hawks

Shawn Russell (born 15 June 1987) is a 4.0 point wheelchair basketball player from Australia. In 2016, he was selected as part of the Rollers for the 2016 Summer Paralympics in Rio de Janeiro.

== Biography ==
Shawn Russell was born on 15 June 1987, with one leg shorter than the other. When he was 16, it was amputated. He was visited by Eino Okkonen, an amputee himself, and the founder of the Wollongong Roller Hawks, a team in the National Wheelchair Basketball League (NWBL). Okkonen tried to persuade Russell to take up wheelchair basketball, but Russell saw himself as a swimmer, and initially declined the offer. Undaunted, Okkonen convinced Russell to attend a Roller Hawks training session, and Russell joined the team in 2004. It went on to win back-to-back titles in 2011 and 2012.

Russell made his international debut with the U23 team (the Spinners) at the FisBIT Games in Kuala Lumpur in 2007, and in 2009 he was part of the team at the IWBF U23 World Wheelchair Basketball Championship in Paris. Later that year he made his debut with the senior national team (the Rollers) at the Asia-Oceania Zone Championship, won by the Rollers. He played overseas in Spain in 2010 and 2011. Moving to Victoria, he joined the Kilsyth Cobras, who win the league title in 2015 and 2016. In June 2016, he toured Great Britain for the 2016 Continental Clash against Canada, Great Britain, Japan, the Netherlands and the United States. The Rollers were defeated by the United States, and won silver. In July 2016, he was selected for the 2016 Summer Paralympics in Rio de Janeiro. He was one of five Rollers selected for their first Paralympics where they finished sixth.
