= Matthew McShane =

Australian wheelchair basketball player (born 1990)

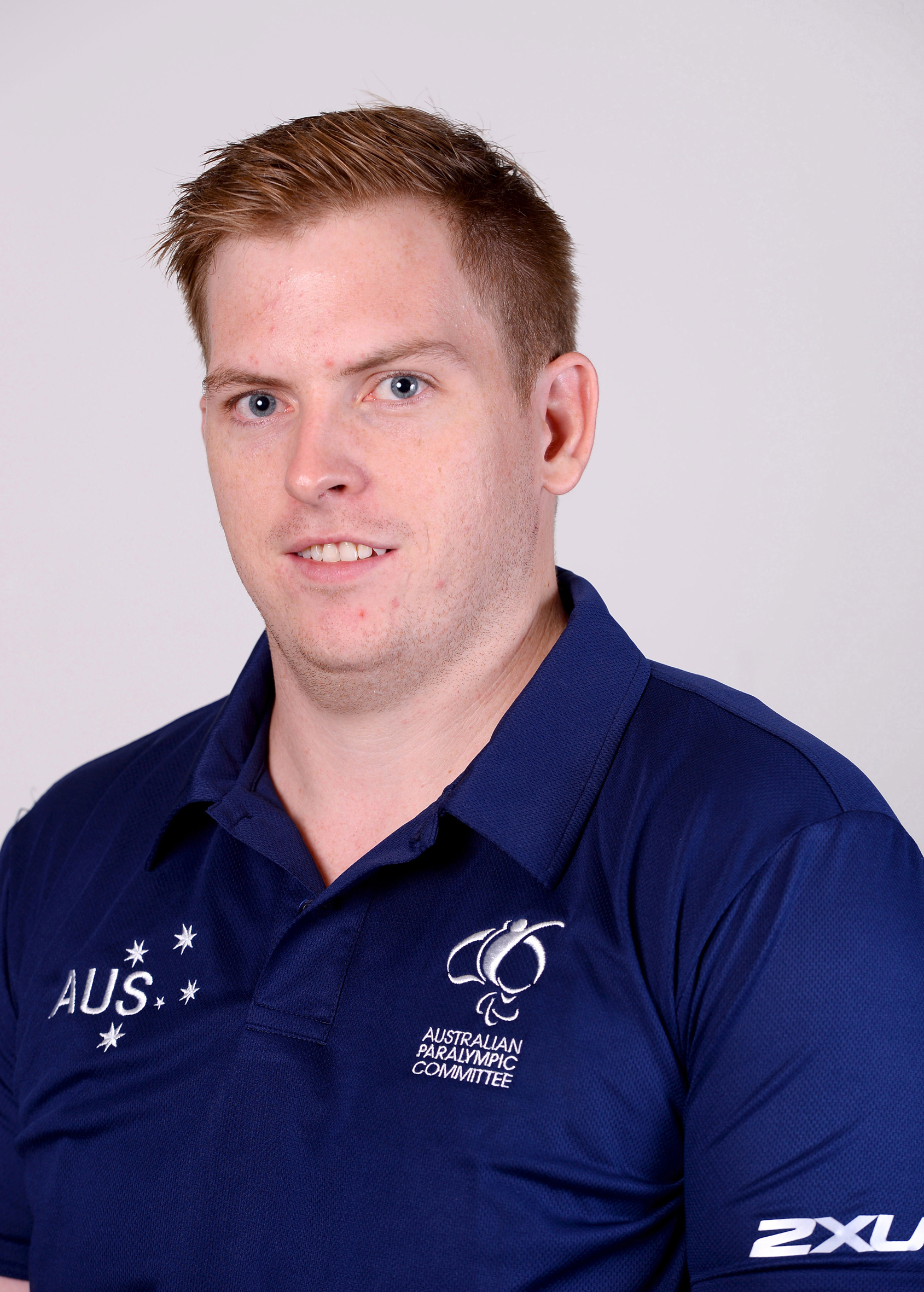
- Portrait of Matthew McShane taken at team processing session for shadow members of 2016 Australian Paralympic team

Personal information
- Nickname: Macca
- Nationality: Australia
- Born: 1 November 1990 (age 35)

Sport
- Position: Guard
- Disability class: 1.5
- Club: Queensland Spinning Bullets
Medal record
World Championship
Bronze medal – third place	2018 Hamburg	Team

Matthew McShane (born 1 November 1990) is a 1.5 point wheelchair basketball player from Australia. He was a member of the Rollers team that competed at the 2020 Summer Paralympics, his second Games.

== Biography ==
Matthew McShane was born on 1 November 1990. When he was 18, he contracted transverse myelitis, a neurological condition in which the spinal cord is inflamed, that left him paraplegic. Coming home from his work one day, he suddenly found that he was unable to move. He was in hospital and rehabilitation for nine months.

He has completed a Bachelor of Industrial Design at the Gold Coast campus of Griffith University.

== Basketball ==
McShane had always enjoyed sports, particularly Australian football, surfing and Skateboarding. During rehabilitation, he was introduced to wheelchair basketball, and played his first game in a social competition on the Gold Coast. He then joined the Queensland Spinning Bullets the National Wheelchair Basketball League (NWBL) as a 1.5 point player, and played his first game with the national team, the Rollers, in November 2014. In June 2016, he toured Great Britain for the 2016 Continental Clash against Canada, Great Britain, Japan, the Netherlands and the United States. The Rollers were defeated by the United States, and won silver. In 2016, he was selected for the 2016 Summer Paralympics in Rio de Janeiro. He was one of five Rollers selected for their first Paralympics where they finished sixth.

In 2018, he was a member of the Rollers that won the bronze medal at 2018 Wheelchair Basketball World Championship in Hamburg, Germany.

At the 2020 Tokyo Paralympics, the Rollers finished fifth with a win–loss record of 4–4.
