= Thomas McHugh =

Thomas or Tom McHugh may refer to:

- Thomas J. McHugh (1919–2000), American soldier in World War II and the Korean War
- Thomas McHugh (politician), first Secretary of State of Wisconsin
- Thomas McHugh (judge), American jurist
- Tom Ed McHugh (born 1943), Louisiana politician
- Tom McHugh (American football), American gridiron football player and coach
- Tom McHugh (basketball), Australian wheelchair basketball player
