= Adam Deans =

Australian wheelchair basketball player

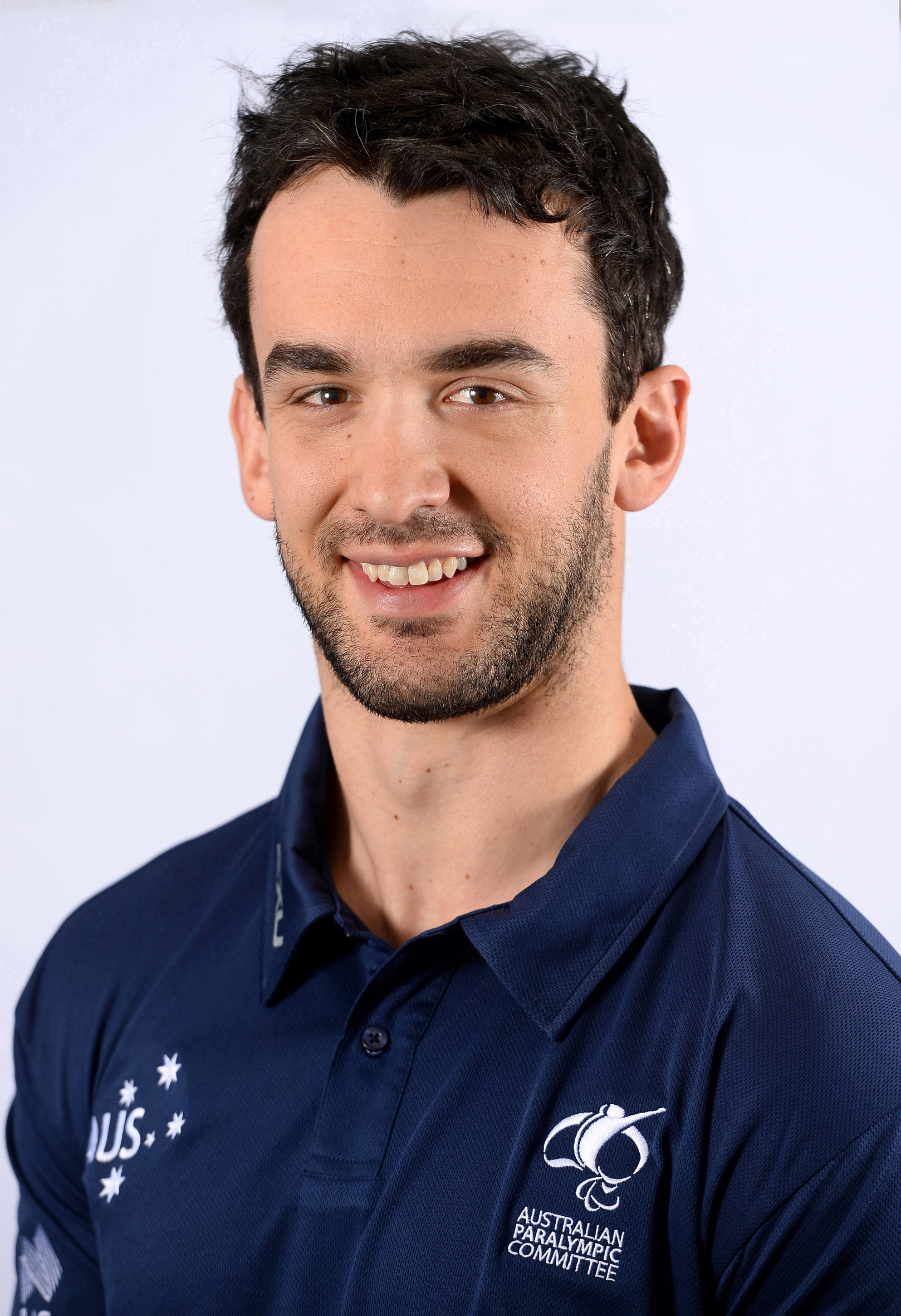
- Portrait of Adam Deans taken at team processing session for shadow members of 2016 Australian Paralympic team

Personal information
- Nationality: Australia
- Born: 16 June 1988 (age 38)

Sport
- Position: Forward/Centre
- Disability class: 4.0
- Club: Perth Wheelcats
Medal record
World Championship
Gold medal – first place	2014 Incheon	Rollers

Adam Deans (born 16 June 1988) is a 4.0 point wheelchair basketball player from Australia. He was part of the Rollers team that won the 2014 Incheon World Wheelchair Basketball Championship, and in 2016, he was selected for the 2016 Summer Paralympics in Rio de Janeiro.

== Biography ==
Adam Deans was born on 16 June 1988. He lives in Dianella, Western Australia. As a boy, he enjoyed playing sports, and dreamt of becoming an Australian Football League; but on 2 June 2005, his left knee gave way while he was walking down the stairs at school, and he fell. Paramedics initially thought that he had dislocated his knee; but it was soon determined that he had broken his leg, and he was taken to Sir Charles Gairdner Hospital, where he had surgery on it the next day. That a young, fit and healthy person could just break his leg like this seemed unlikely to the doctors at the hospital. Deans assured them that he had not been pushed, so a biopsy was ordered. On 28 June 2005, he was notified that he had been diagnosed with osteosarcoma, a cancerous tumour in his left femur. The doctors recommended chemotherapy to reduce the tumour in order to make it easier to amputate the leg. An MRI in July revealed that the chemotherapy had been ineffective, and the leg was amputated on 23 August 2005. After two weeks at Shenton Park Rehabilitation Hospital, he returned to school, and completed his Year 12 exams.

In 2008 a friend took him to see the wheelchair basketball training, and he was taken with their professionalism. He debuted for the Perth Wheelcats in the National Wheelchair Basketball League (NWBL) as a 4.0 point player. The Wheelcats went on to win the NWBL championships in 2009, 2010, 2013 and 2014. That year he was selected for the U23 team (the Spinners) for the IWBF U23 World Wheelchair Basketball Championship in Paris, and then made his debut with the national team, the Rollers in August. He was the Wheelchair Sports WA rookie of the year in 2009, and was awarded a $2,000 Redkite Dare to Dream scholarship, enabling him to buy a custom-made wheelchair.

A broken wrist sidelined Deans in 2010, and he missed out on selection for the 2012 Summer Paralympics in London, but in 2014 he was part of the Rollers team that won gold at the 2014 Incheon World Wheelchair Basketball Championship. He graduated from Edith Cowan University with a Bachelor of Science degree, majoring in sports science, in 2014. He was awarded its Elite Athlete of the Year award in November 2014, and in 2016 commenced studying for a diploma in primary Education. In June 2016, he toured Great Britain for the 2016 Continental Clash against Canada, Great Britain, Japan, the Netherlands and the United States. The Rollers were defeated by the United States, and won silver. In 2016, he was selected for the 2016 Summer Paralympics in Rio de Janeiro. He was one of five Rollers selected for their first Paralympics where they finished sixth.
