= Joshua Allison =

Australian wheelchair basketball player

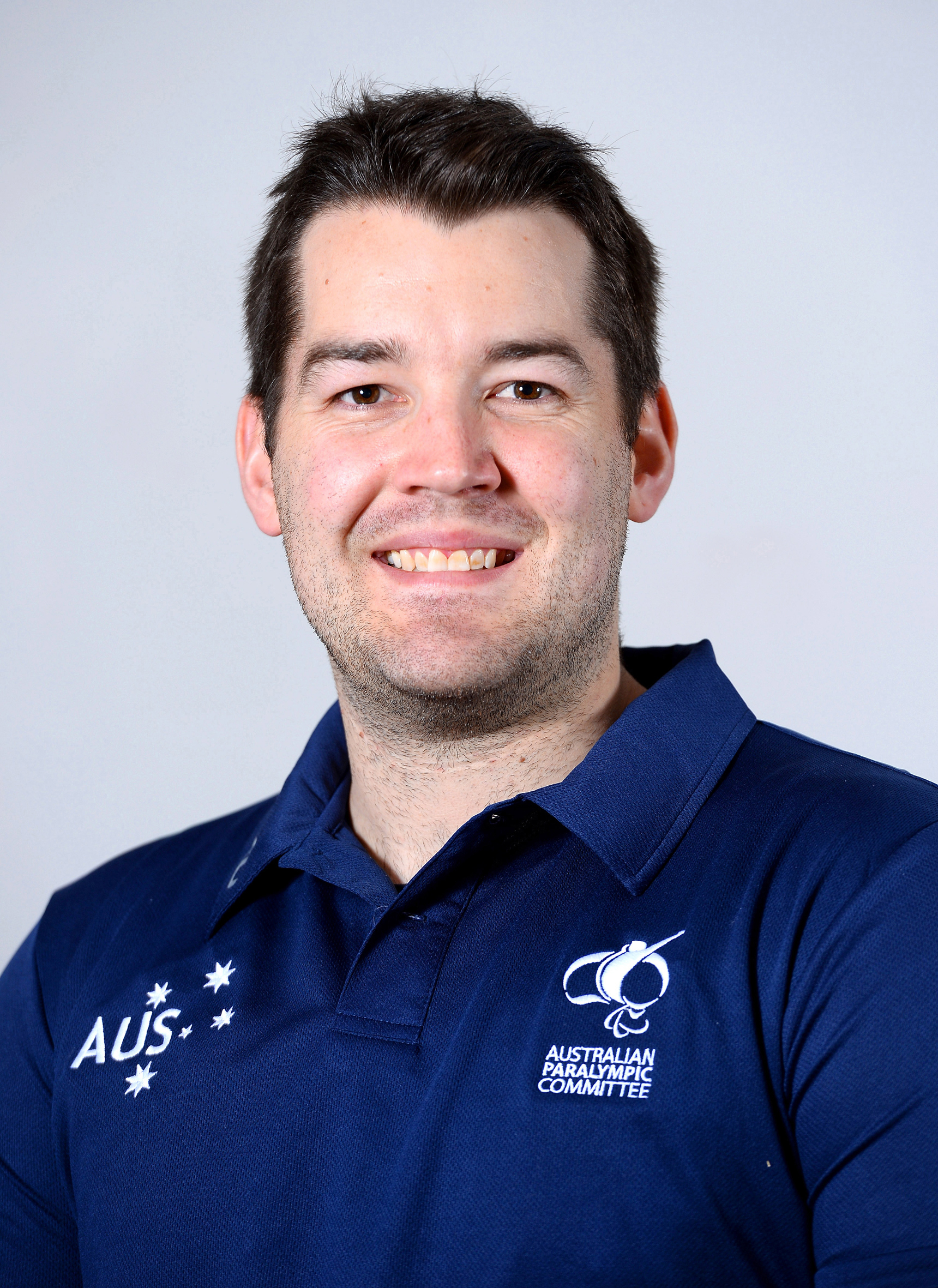
- Portrait of Josh Allison taken at team processing session for shadow members of 2016 Australian Paralympic team

Personal information
- Full name: Joshua Malcolm Allison
- Nickname: Truck
- Nationality: Australian
- Born: 27 March 1986 (age 40)
- Height: 6.5

Sport
- Position: Guard
- Disability class: 1.0
- Club: Kilsyth Cobras
Medal record
World Championship
Gold medal – first place	2014 Incheon	Rollers

Joshua Allison (born 27 March 1986) is a 1.0 point wheelchair basketball player from Australia. He played basketball for the Kilsyth Cobras and the Sherbroke Suns before suffering a serious accident in 2011. He began playing wheelchair basketball in 2013, and was selected for the national team (the Rollers) in 2014. That year he was part of the team that won the 2014 Incheon World Wheelchair Basketball Championship. In 2016, he represented Australia the 2016 Summer Paralympics in Rio de Janeiro.

== Biography ==
Joshua Allison was born on 27 March 1986. He has a Certificate III in bricklaying from the Holmesglen Institute of TAFE in Moorabbin, Victoria, and has three children named Keeley, Willow, Hudson. Some 194 centimetres (76 in) tall, he played basketball for the Kilsyth Cobras in the Victorian League from 2004 to 2006, and in the South East Australian Basketball League (SEABL) from 2006 to 2007, and for the Sherbrooke Suns in the Big V league from 2008 to 2010. On 1 October 2011, he fell 2 metres (6 ft 7 in) through a hand rail at his home in Croydon, Victoria. He suffered severe injuries, including fractures in his neck and back, and crushing his spinal cord, rendering him paraplegic. The news came as a profound shock to his fellow players, who played a fund-raiser game for him on 5 February 2012.

During his rehabilitation, Allison took up wheelchair basketball in 2013, taking to the court to play for the Kilsyth Cobras once more, this time in the National Wheelchair Basketball League (NWBL) as a 1.0 point player. Wrist bands were sold, and a boot camp and an online auction held to raise money for an $8,000 basketball wheelchair. The Cobras went on to win the NWBL championships in 2015 and 2016. He made his international debut with the Australia men's national wheelchair basketball team (known as the Rollers) in April 2014 in a tour of the Netherlands and Belgium. Later that year he was part of the Rollers team that won gold at the 2014 Incheon World Wheelchair Basketball Championship. In June 2016, he toured Great Britain for the 2016 Continental Clash against Canada, Great Britain, Japan, the Netherlands and the United States. The Rollers were defeated by the United States, and won silver. In 2016, he was selected for the 2016 Summer Paralympics in Rio de Janeiro.

He was one of five Rollers selected for their first Paralympics where they finished sixth.
