= MGAC =

MGAC may refer to:

- Mirndiyan Gununa Aboriginal Corporation, an organisation in Queensland, Australia
- Morris Goding Accessibility Consulting, Australian consultancy founded by Nick Morris (basketball)
