= Cecconato =

Cecconato (pronounced [tʃekkoˈnaːto]) is an Italian surname from Treviso and Latina, derived from the given name Cecco. Notable people with the surname include:

- Carlos Cecconato (1930–2018), Argentine footballer
- Orfeo Cecconato (born 1969), Australian wheelchair basketball player

== See also ==
- Cecchinato
