= NWBL =

NWBL may refer to:

- National Women's Basketball League, United States
- National Wheelchair Basketball League (Australia)
