= Ben Ettridge =

Australian basketball coach

Benjamin James Ettridge (born 15 April 1974) is an Australian basketball coach.

== Playing career ==
Ettridge competed in the State Basketball League between 1993 and 2004, playing for the Cockburn Cougars (1993–1994), Willetton Tigers (1995–1996), Mandurah Magic (1997–1999; 2002–2004) and Perth Redbacks (2001).

== Coaching career ==
=== National wheelchair basketball teams ===
Ettridge has served in a variety of men and women's coaching positions for Australia's national wheelchair basketball program. He served as the head coach of the Australian men's Under 23 team, an assistant with the women's national senior team and as head coach of the men's senior team. He became the head coach of the men's senior team in 2007 and guided them to gold at the Arafura Games. From 2007, the Rollers won 5 consecutive AOZ Championships, compiling a 45 wins and no loss record.

=== Paralympics ===
Ettridge coached the gold-medal winning Australia men's national wheelchair basketball team at the 2008 Summer Paralympics. In 2012, he was the coach of the silver-medal winning team at the Summer Paralympics.

=== World Cups ===
In 2010, the Rollers went undefeated at the World Cup in Birmingham, including a second-half 19-point comeback win against the USA in the semi-finals. In 2014, the Rollers completed a similar feat in Incheon, prevailing over the USA in the gold medal match.

=== National Wheelchair Basketball League ===
In 2004, Ettridge became the head coach of the National Wheelchair Basketball League's Perth Wheelcats. His father, Len Ettridge, served as the team's assistant coach. In his second year as head coach, he took the team to the NWBL's championship final, where they lost to the West Sydney Razorbacks. In 2006, the Wheelcats lost only one game all season before going on to win the league championship. In 2007, he guided the Wheelcats to back-to-back championships. He then coached the Wheelcats to victory at the World Champions Cup, in a tournament where they did not lose a single game. In 2008, he was again the Wheelcats coach and the team lost only one game during the regular season before winning the NWBL's championship once again. In 2009, the Wheelcats ran the table again, defeating the Sydney Wheelkings to secure their fourth consecutive NWBL championship. In 2010, he left his coaching job with the Wheelcats to focus on the Rollers' World Cup campaign, a move that proved to be highly successful. His record during his time as a NWBL head coach was 118 wins and 11 losses.

In 2024, Ettridge re-joined the Perth Wheelcats as head coach.

=== SBL / NBL1 West ===
In 2011, Ettridge was appointed coach of the Wanneroo Wolves' MSBL team and went on to guide them to their first championship since 1993. Following the 2012 season, he stepped down as coach of the Wolves due to work commitments in Sydney. He returned to the Wolves for the 2015 season and guided them to another championship. After four straight grand final defeats between 2016 and 2019, Ettridge parted ways with the Wolves.

In October 2019, Ettridge was appointed head coach of the East Perth Eagles men's team. However, he parted ways with East Perth in February 2020, prior to the start of the 2020 season.

In September 2021, after two seasons as an assistant coach, Ettridge was elevated to head coach of the Kalamunda Eastern Suns for the 2022 NBL1 West season.

In 2023, Ettridge joined the Warwick Senators men's team as an assistant.

== Recognition ==
In 2009, the Australian Paralympic Committee named him as one of their finalists for their Coach of the Year award. While coaching the Wheelcats, he was named the NWBL Coach of the Year three times. He is also a five-time Wheelchair Sports WA Coach of the Year. In November 2014, he was awarded the Australian College of Physical Education Coach of the Year at the New South Wales Institute of Sport awards.

== Personal ==
Ettridge is the son of former Paralympian, Len Ettridge.
