= Jaylen Brown (disambiguation) =

Jaylen Brown (born 1996) is an American basketball player in the NBA.

Jaylen Brown may also refer to:

- Jaylen Brown (wheelchair basketball) (born 2004), Australian wheelchair basketball player

== See also ==
- Jaelyn Brown (born 1998), American basketball player in the WNBA
- Jalen Brown (born 1995), American soccer player
- Jaylon Brown (born 1994), American basketball player in Europe
