= Andrew Flavel =

Australian wheelchair basketball player

Andrew Flavell
Personal information
- Nationality: Australia
- Born: 30 December 1971 (age 54) Ballarat, Victoria
Medal record
Wheelchair basketball
Paralympic Games
Silver medal – second place	2004 Athens	Men's wheelchair basketball
World Championship
Bronze medal – third place	2006 Amsterdam	Team

Andrew Flavell (born 30 December 1971) is an Australian wheelchair basketball player. He was born in Ballarat, Victoria. He was part of the silver medal-winning Australia men's national wheelchair basketball team at the 2004 Athens Paralympics. He also participated in National Wheelchair Basketball League and represented Dandenong Rangers twice, first in 2002 and second in 2004 but in 2007 he played for Wollongong Rollerhawks in the league.
