= Kim Robbins =

Australian basketball player

Personal information
- Nationality: Australia
- Born: 12 June 1988 (age 38)

Sport
- Position: Point guard
- Disability class: 3.0
Medal record
World Championship
Bronze medal – third place	2018 Hamburg	Team

Kim Robbins (born 12 June 1988) is a wheelchair basketball player from Australia.

== Biography ==
He was a member of the 2009 Under-23 Spinners team. His first senior major international competition was at the 2018 Wheelchair Basketball World Championship in Hamburg, Germany where the Rollers won the bronze medal.

He plays for Be Active Perth Wheelcats in the National Wheelchair Basketball League.
