= Adrian King (basketball) =

Australian wheelchair basketball player

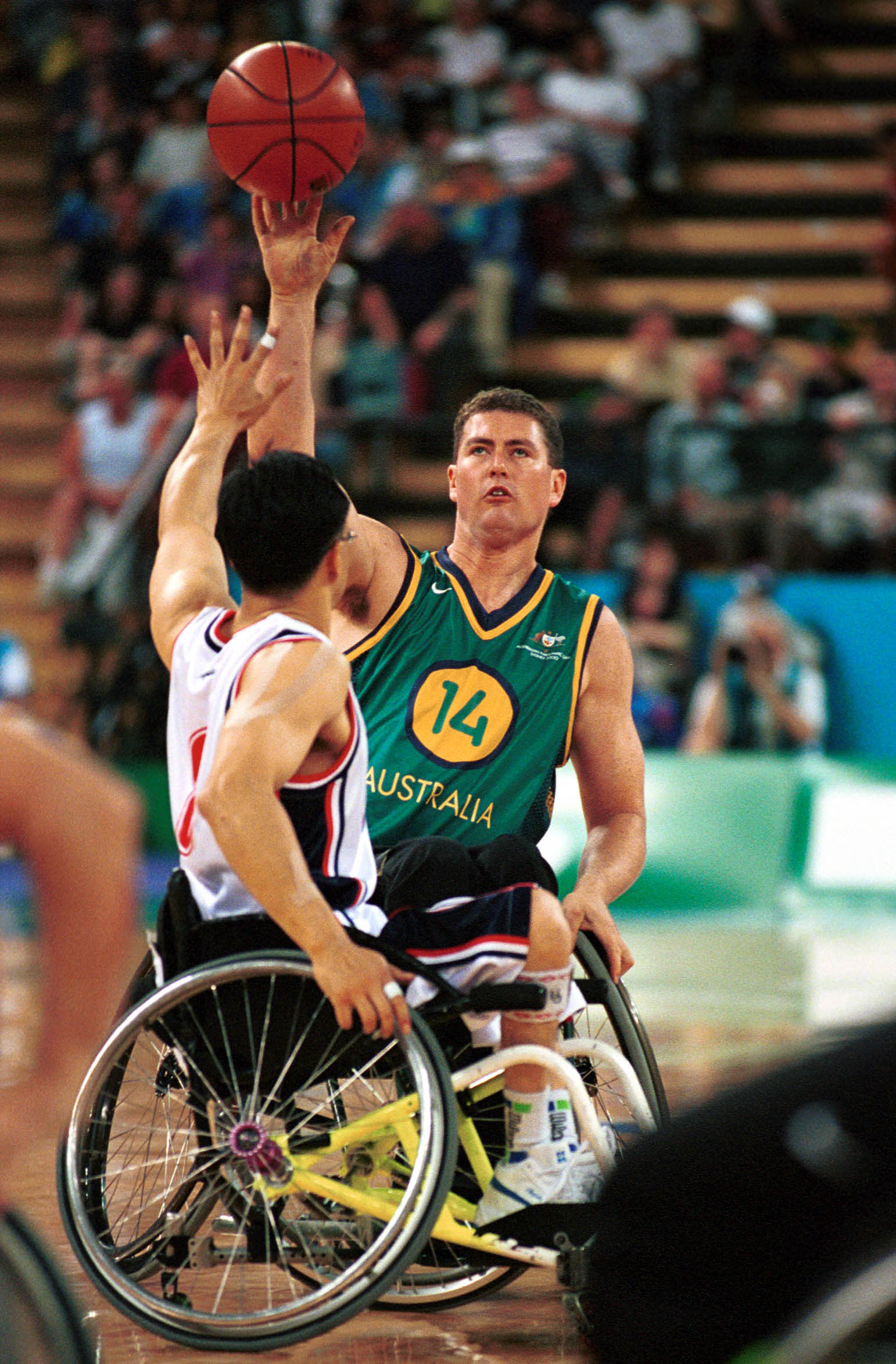
- King shoots the ball during competition at the 2000 Sydney Paralympics

Personal information
- Full name: Adrian John King
- Nationality: Australia
- Born: 21 November 1971 (age 54) Tamworth, New South Wales
Medal record
Wheelchair basketball
Paralympic Games
Silver medal – second place	2004 Athens	Men's wheelchair basketball
Gold medal – first place	2008 Beijing	Men's wheelchair basketball
World Championship
Bronze medal – third place	2006 Amsterdam	Team

Adrian John King, OAM (born 21 November 1971 in Tamworth, New South Wales) is an Australian wheelchair basketball player. He was part of the Australia men's national wheelchair basketball team at the 2000 Sydney, 2004 Athens, and 2008 Beijing Paralympics. He won a silver medal as part of the 2004 team and a gold medal as part of the 2008 team, for which he received a Medal of the Order of Australia. He is currently living in Queensland.

Adrian was supposed to compete at a Four-Nation Invitational Tournament in Osnabrück, Germany. He was however unable to compete after undergoing shoulder surgery. Adrian was a member of the Australian Men's Wheelchair Basketball team for the 2009 Rollers World Challenge. In 2009, Sporting Wheelies and Disabled held a four-match wheelchair basketball series with between the Rockwheelers and the national league team, the Brisbane Spinning Bullets. King was part of the winning team, the Brisbane Spinning Bullets, and yet still took the opportunity to assist the Rockwheelers' players in bettering their basketball ability. King competed in the 2011 Frank Ponta Cup as a member of 'Team Gould' with the aim of this tournament being to gain recognition for wheelchair basketball. In 2013, King competed in the National Wheelchair Basketball League (NWBL) for the RSL Queensland Spinning Bullets where his team finished in 3rd place.

In 2013, he was honoured in the Tamworth Regional Olympian Honour Wall. He received this honour for his participation in the 2004 and 2008 Paralympic Games. King ended his Paralympic career with one gold medal and one silver medal both as a member of the Australian Men's Wheelchair Basketball team.

Adrian King is a qualified investment adviser with Gamma Wealth Management where he has over 11 years experience in assisting clients to manage their investments. King specialises in managing clients' financial affairs with a key focus on compensation payments, marital breakdown or deceased estate settlements.

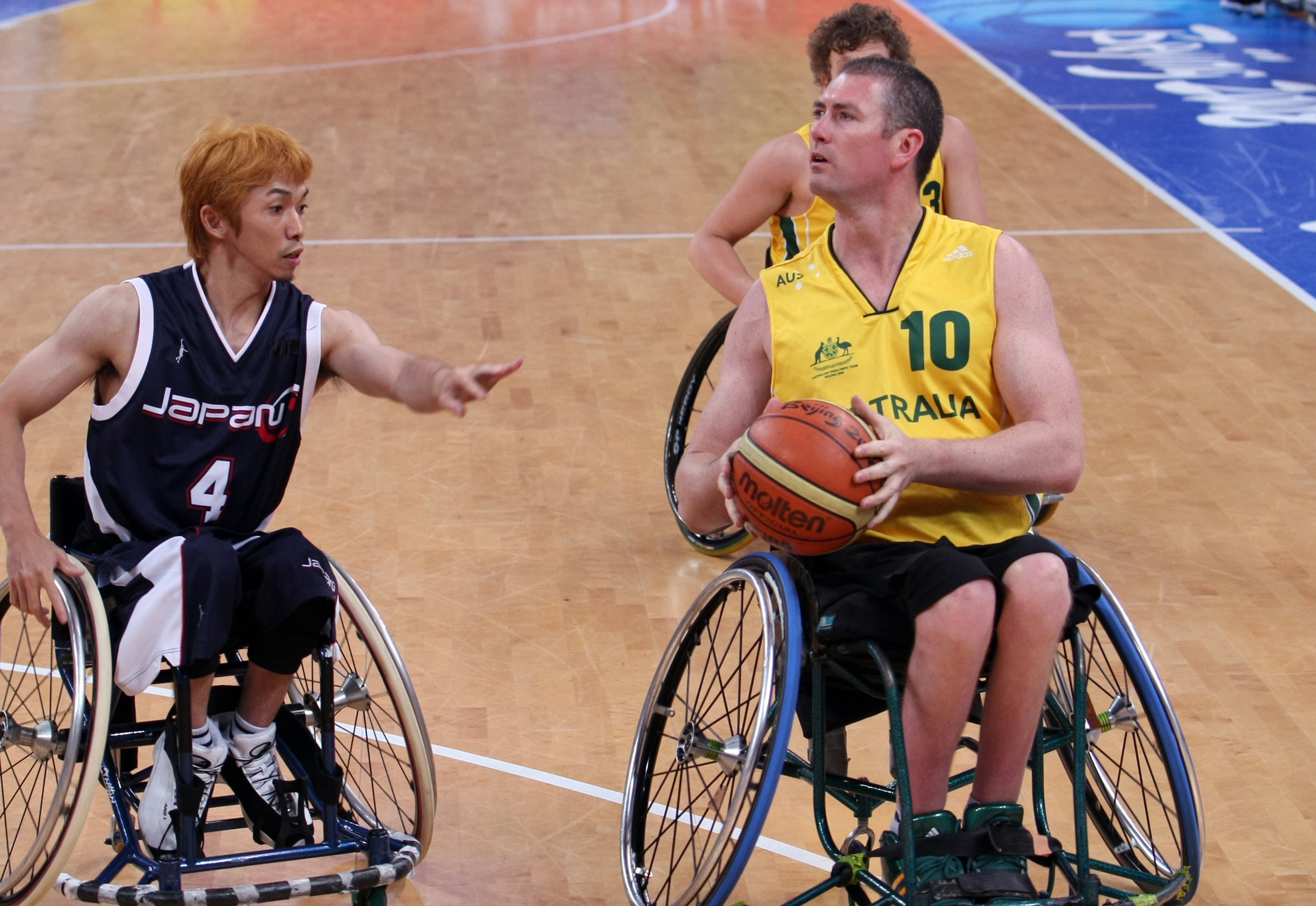
