= Erich Hubel =

Personal information
- Nationality: Australia
Medal record
Athletics
Paralympic Games
Silver medal – second place	1980 Arnhem	Men's 800 m 5
Bronze medal – third place	1980 Arnhem	Men's 1500 m 5
Bronze medal – third place	1980 Arnhem	Men's 100 m 5

Erich Hubel is an Australian Paralympic athlete and wheelchair basketballer. At the 1980 Arnhem Paralympics, he won a silver medal in the Men's 800 m 5 event and two bronze medals in the Men's 1500 m 5 and Men's 100 m 5 events. He was also part of the Australia men's national wheelchair basketball team at the 1980 Arnhem, 1984 New York/Stoke Mandeville, and 1988 Seoul Paralympics.
