= Timothy Maloney =

Australian wheelchair basketball player

Tim Maloney
Personal information
- Full name: Timothy Ian Maloney
- Nationality: Australia
- Born: 6 October 1967 (age 58) Adelaide, South Australia
Medal record
Wheelchair basketball
Paralympic Games
| Gold medal – first place | 1996 Atlanta | Men's wheelchair basketball |

Timothy Ian Maloney, OAM (born 6 October 1967) is an Australian wheelchair basketball player. He was born in Adelaide, South Australia. He was part of the Australia men's national wheelchair basketball team at the 1992 Barcelona and 1996 Atlanta Paralympics; in 1996 he won a gold medal as part of the winning team, for which he received a Medal of the Order of Australia. In 2000, he received an Australian Sports Medal.
