= Troy Andrews (basketball) =

Australian Paralympic wheelchair basketball player and shooter

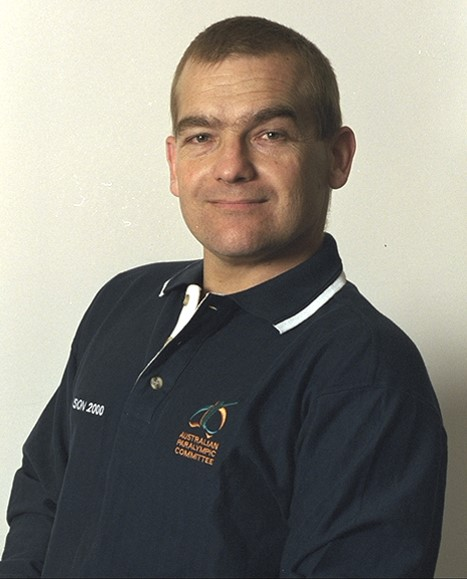
- 2000 Australian Paralympic team portrait of Andrews

Personal information
- Full name: Troy Andrews
- Nationality: Australia
- Born: 1 December 1961 (age 64) Broken Hill, New South Wales
Medal record
Wheelchair basketball
Paralympic Games
Gold medal – first place	1996 Atlanta	Men's wheelchair basketball

Troy Kenneth Andrews, OAM(born 1 December 1961) is an Australian wheelchair basketball player and shooter, who has represented Australia at five Paralympics from 1984 to 2000. He was born in the New South Wales city of Broken Hill. At the 1984 New York/Stoke Mandeville Games, he came fourth in the Men's Air Pistol 2-6 - event. He was part of the Australia men's national wheelchair basketball team at the 1988 Seoul, 1992 Barcelona, 1996 Atlanta, and 2000 Sydney Games. He won a gold medal as part of the winning Australian team in 1996, for which he received a Medal of the Order of Australia. In 2000, he received an Australian Sports Medal.
