= Daryl Taylor (basketball) =

Australian wheelchair basketball player

Personal information
- Nationality: Australia
- Born: 21 May 1966 (age 60) Adelaide, South Australia
Medal record
Wheelchair basketball
Paralympic Games
Silver medal – second place	2004 Athens	Men's wheelchair basketball
World Championship
Bronze medal – third place	2006 Amsterdam	Team

Daryl Taylor (born 21 May 1966) is an Australian wheelchair basketball player. He was born in Adelaide, South Australia. He was part of the silver medal-winning Australia men's national wheelchair basketball team at the 2004 Summer Paralympics.
