= Phil Evans (basketball) =

Australian basketball player (born 1990)

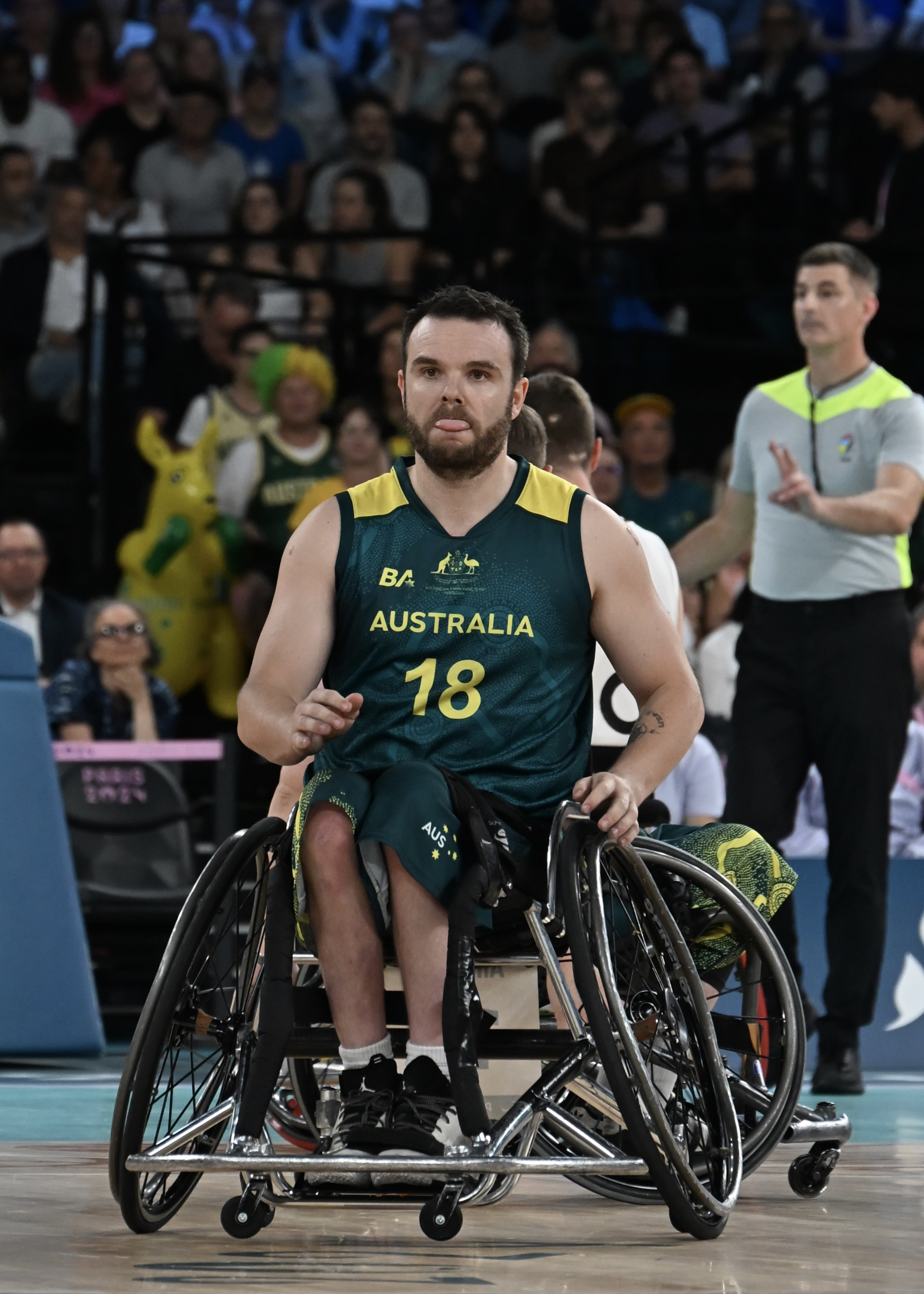
- Evans at the 2024 Summer Paralympics

Personal information
- Nationality: Australia
- Born: 18 September 1990 (age 36)

Sport
- Disability class: 2.0
- Club: Perth Wheelcats
Medal record
World Championship
Gold medal – first place	2026 Ottawa	Team

Philip "Phil" Evans (born 18 September 1990) is a 2.0 point wheelchair basketball player from Australia. He was a member of the Rollers at the 2024 Paris Paralympics.

== Biography ==
Evans was born on 18 September 1990 and his hometown is Perth, Western Australia. He attended Sacred Heart College, Sorrento. In September 2013, after having celebrating a premiership football win with friends, crashed his car on the way home. The car accident him fracturing his T-11 and T-12 vertebrae, paralysing him from the waist down. In 2018, Evans was awarded the Craig H Nielsen Scholarship, at the University of Arizona, where he majored in business.

In 2024, he is employed at the University of Western Australia as an Inclusion Coordinator.

== Basketball ==
Evans played many sports growing up including Australian rules football, indoor and outdoor cricket, mixed netball, rugby union, tennis and golf. After his accident, he coached a senior Whitford's AFL side, where he played A Grade Football in 2009-2010 and 2012–2013.

He was introduced to wheelchair basketball through attending ‘come and try’ day at the Herb Graham Recreation Centre organised by Rebound WA. He was selected to play for the Perth Wheelcats in Australia's National Wheelchair Basketball League and this led him to be offered a University of Arizona scholarship to join their wheelchair basketball program.

He was a member of the Rollers team at the 2024 IWBF Asia-Oceania Championships in Thailand, where they won the gold medal and qualified for 2024 Summer Paralympics.

At the 2024 Paris Paralympics, he was a member of the Rollers that finished fifth with a win/loss record of 4-4. He was a member of the Rollers that defeated Italy 81 - 57 to win the gold medal at the 2026 Wheelchair Basketball World Championships in Ottawa, Canada.
