= Samuel White (basketball) =

Australian basketball player

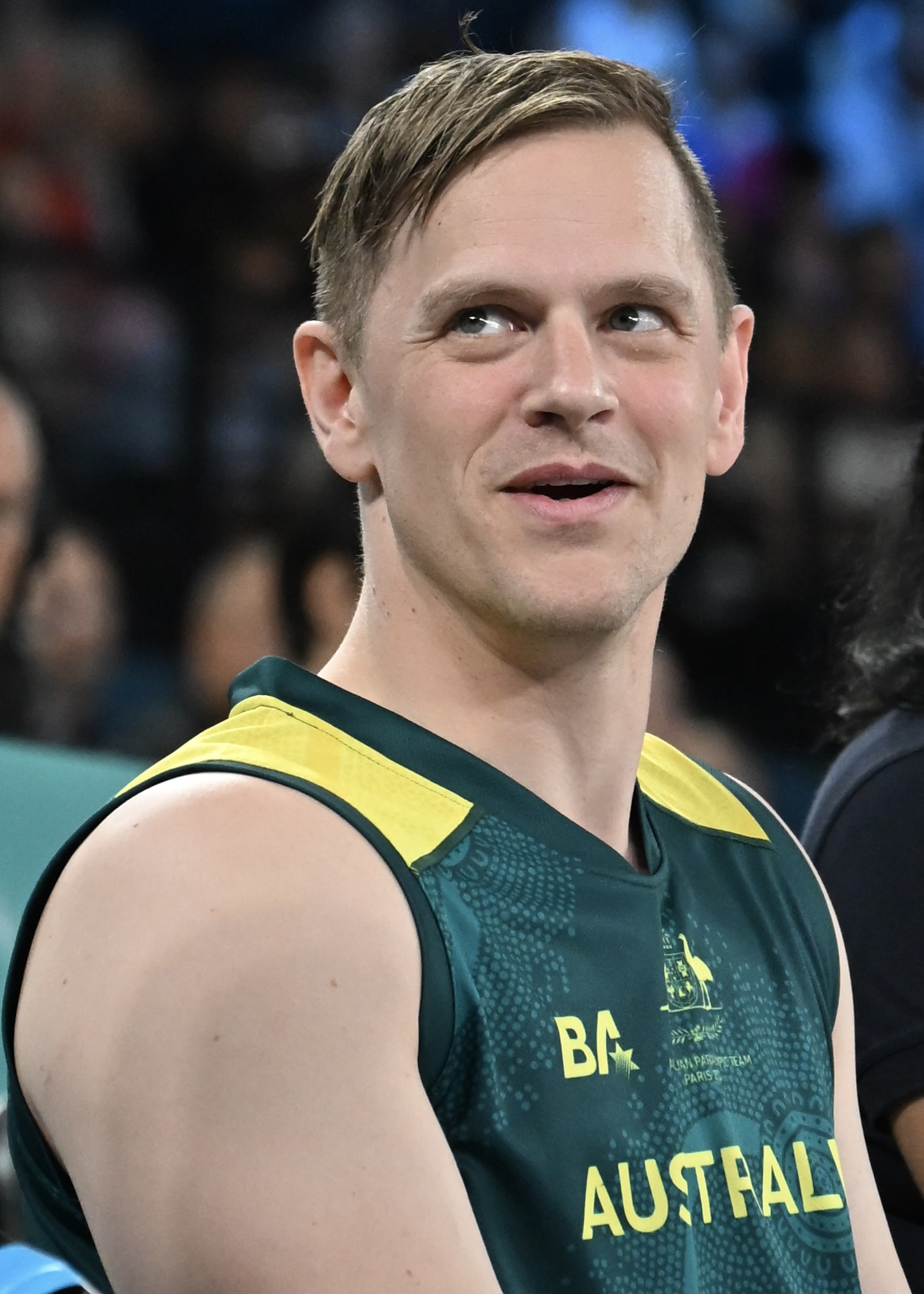
- White at the 2024 Summer Paralympics

Personal information
- Nationality: Australia

Sport
- Position: Guard
- Disability class: 1.0
- Club: Darwin Salties
Medal record
World Championship
Gold medal – first place	2026 Ottawa	Team
Bronze medal – third place	2018 Hamburg	Team

Samuel "Sammy" White is a 1.0 point wheelchair basketball player from Australia. He was a member of the Rollers team that competed at the 2020 Tokyo Paralympics and at the 2024 Paris Paralympics.

== Biography ==
White was born on 19 June 1987. In 2010, a motorcycle accident left him without the use of his legs. White moved from Adelaide to Wisconsin with his family to join the University of Washington wheelchair basketball team while studying information technology systems. At the University of Wisconsin-Whitewater he completed Bachelor of Business Administration and Information Technology and MSE-PD Athletic Administration and Higher Education Leadership.

== Basketball ==
He is a 1.0 point player. Whilst in the United States, his team won the college championship in back-to-back years from 2014 to 2015. He was a member of Australian Rollers squad in the lead up to 2016 Summer Paralympics.

He was a member of the Rollers at 2018 Wheelchair Basketball World Championship in Hamburg, Germany, where they won the bronze medal.

At the 2020 Tokyo Paralympics, the Rollers finished fifth with a win/loss record of 4-4. At the 2024 Paris Paralympics, the Rollers finished fifth with a win/loss record of 4-4. He was a member of the Rollers that defeated Italy 81 - 57 to win the gold medal at the 2026 Wheelchair Basketball World Championships in Ottawa, Canada.

In 2023, he was awarded 2023 Queensland Basketball Wheelchair Athlete of the Year.
