= Brendan Dowler =

Australian wheelchair basketballer

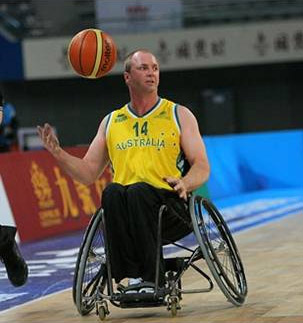

Personal information
- Full name: Brendan John Dowler
- Nationality: Australia
Medal record
Wheelchair basketball
Paralympic Games
Silver medal – second place	2004 Athens	Men's wheelchair basketball
Gold medal – first place	2008 Beijing	Men's wheelchair basketball
World Championship
Bronze medal – third place	2006 Amsterdam	Team

Brendan John Dowler is an Australian Paralympian, and coaches wheelchair basketball.

== Personal ==
Dowler is from Wollongong, New South Wales, has three siblings and is married, with 2 children. He attended the University of Wollongong, earning a degree in IT. He became paraplegic as a result of a spinal tumour. When not coaching wheelchair basketball, he is an IT Manager. '

In 2008, he was working for Pillar Administration. He was still working with the company in 2017, having been taken over by Mercer Administration Services.

== Basketball ==
Dowler is classified as a 1.0 player. He started playing wheelchair basketball in 1995.

=== National team ===
Dowler first represented Australia in 2001 and has had over 100 caps for the team.

==== Paralympics ====
Dowler was considered for selection for the 2000 Summer Paralympics but did not make it.

He was part of the silver medal-winning Australia men's national wheelchair basketball team at the 2004 Summer Paralympics. He was part of the gold medal-winning Australia men's national wheelchair basketball team at the 2008 Summer Paralympics, for which he received a Medal of the Order of Australia.

=== Club basketball ===
During his club basketball career, Dowler played for and won national titles with both the Wollongong Rollerhawks and the Sydney Razorbacks.

In 2001 and 2003 he was named one of the NWBL's All-Star Five, additionally in 2003 he was also named the NWBL's Low point MVP.

Dowler coached the Wollongong Roller Hawks to the National League Australian National Wheelchair Basketball League (NWBL) in 5 seasons - 2012, 2017, 2018, 2019 & 2022. There was no season in 2020 due to COVID restrictions, and the team was undefeated for the 2021 season that was abandoned with one round remaining, also due to COVID.

Dowler was named the NWBL Coach of the Year for the 2012, 2017 and 2019 seasons.

== Public speaking ==
Dowler has done public speaking. In November 2008, he and Brett Stibners spoke at the Sydney Business School's annual Town and Gown function.

== Recognition ==
In 1999, Dowler was awarded a University Blue by the University of Wollongong.

In 2004, Dowler and Tristan Knowles were awarded the title of Illawarra Mercury Sports Star of the Year Award.

In 2008, Dowler, Tristan Knowles, Brett Stibners and Troy Sachs were awarded the title of Illawarra Mercury Sports Star of the Year Award.

In 2022, Dowler was awarded the Coach of the Year at the Illawarra Sports Awards
