= David Selby (basketball) =

Australian wheelchair basketball player

Personal information
- Full name: David Thomas Selby
- Nationality: Australia
- Born: 29 May 1965 (age 61) Sydney, New South Wales
Medal record
Wheelchair basketball
Paralympic Games
Gold medal – first place	1996 Atlanta	Men's wheelchair basketball
Silver medal – second place	2004 Athens	Men's wheelchair basketball

David Thomas Selby, OAM (born 29 May 1969) is an Australian wheelchair basketball player. He was born in Sydney, New South Wales. He was part of the gold medal-winning Australia men's national wheelchair basketball team at the 1996 Summer Paralympics, for which he received a Medal of the Order of Australia. He was also part of the silver medal-winning Australia men's national wheelchair basketball team at the 2004 Summer Paralympics.
