= Stuart Ewin =

Australian wheelchair basketball player

Personal information
- Full name: Stuart James Ewin
- Nationality: Australia
- Born: 2 October 1967 (age 58) Melbourne
Medal record
Wheelchair basketball
Paralympic Games
Gold medal – first place	1996 Atlanta	Men's wheelchair basketball

Stuart James Ewin, OAM (born 2 October 1967) is an Australian wheelchair basketball player. He was born in Melbourne. He was part of the Australia men's national wheelchair basketball team at the 1988 Seoul, 1992 Barcelona, and 1996 Atlanta Paralympics; he won a gold medal as part of the 1996 team, for which he received a Medal of the Order of Australia.
