= Nick Taylor (basketball) =

Australian wheelchair basketball player

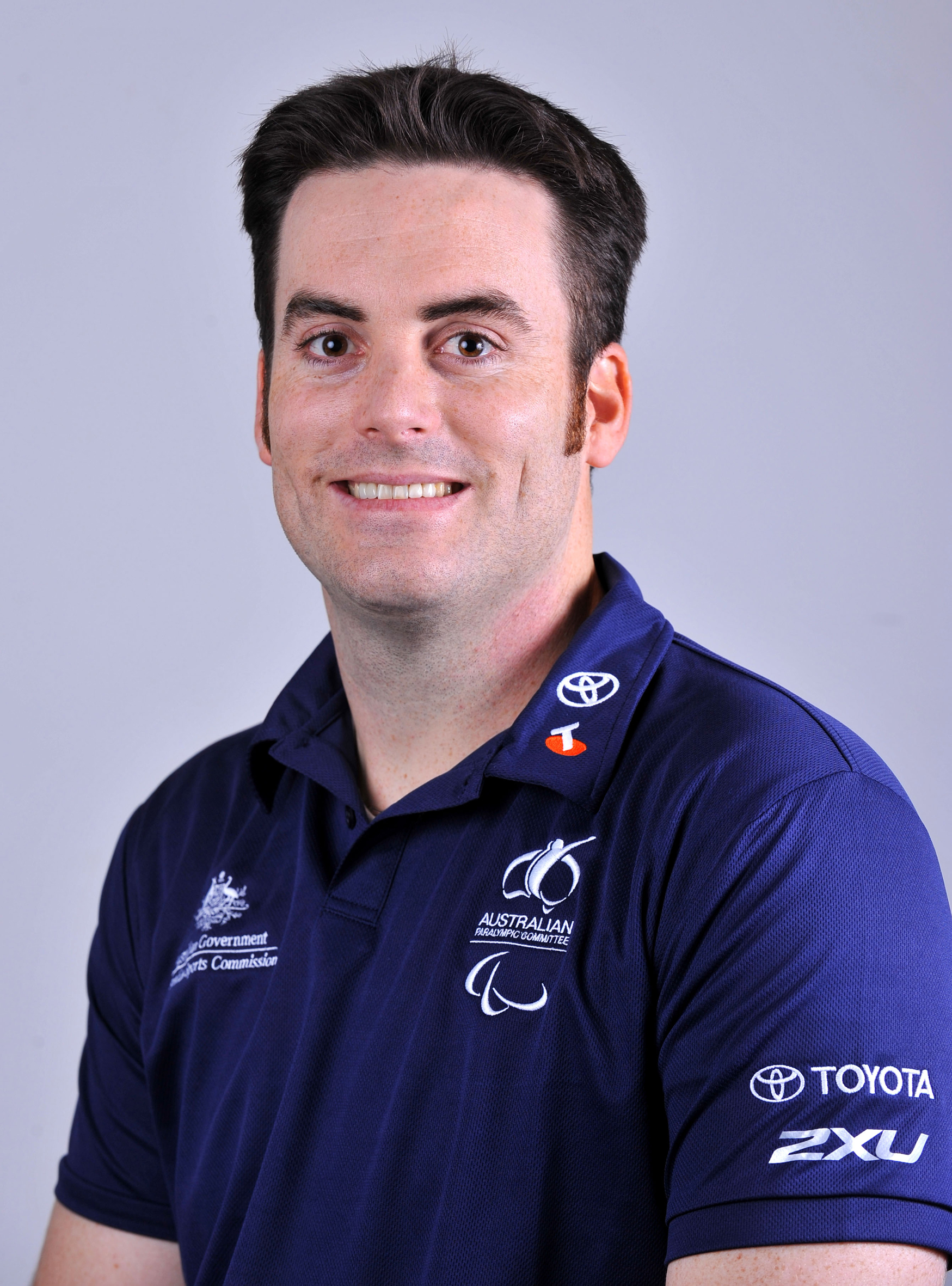
- 2012 Australian Paralympic team portrait of Taylor

Personal information
- Nationality: Australia
- Born: 18 January 1980 (age 46)

Sport
- Country: Australia
- Sport: Wheelchair basketball
- Event: Men's team
- College team: University of Texas at Arlington
- Team: Wollongong Roller Hawks
- Turned pro: 2005
Medal record
Wheelchair basketball
Paralympic Games
Silver medal – second place	2012 London	Men's wheelchair basketball
World Championship
Gold medal – first place	2014 Incheon	Team

Nick Taylor (born 18 January 1980) is a wheelchair basketball player. He competed at the 2008 Summer Paralympics playing for the South Africa men's national wheelchair basketball team. He represented Australia at the 2012 Summer Paralympics in wheelchair basketball, being part of the men's team that won silver. After basketball, he successfully took up wheelchair golf and won the inaugural Australian Wheelchair Golf Championship.

== Personal ==
Taylor was born on 18 January 1980 in South Africa. He became a paraplegic as a result of a car accident in South Africa when he was eighteen years old the day before he was supposed to play in a basketball tournament. He attended university in Cape Town and at the University of Texas. In 2005, he moved to Illawarra, New South Wales, participating in a surfing tryout that year. In 2012, he lived in Towradgi, New South Wales.

== Basketball ==
Growing up, Taylor played basketball in South Africa, playing for the South Africa junior national basketball team. He also played for the Natal representative side and was scheduled to play in the 1998 U19 South African National Championships but was involved in a serious car accident the day before the competition.

== Wheelchair basketball ==
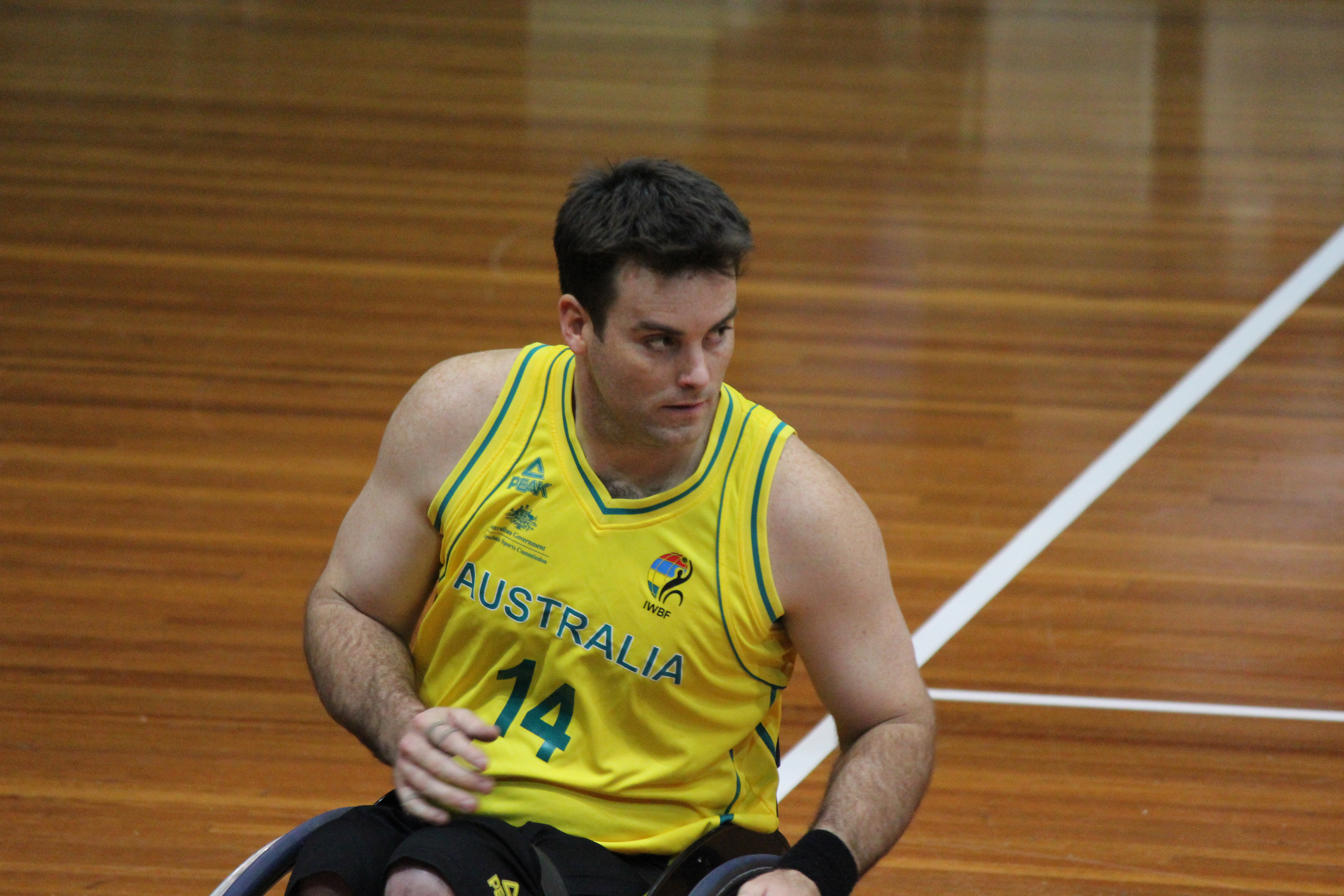
Taylor at a game in Sydney

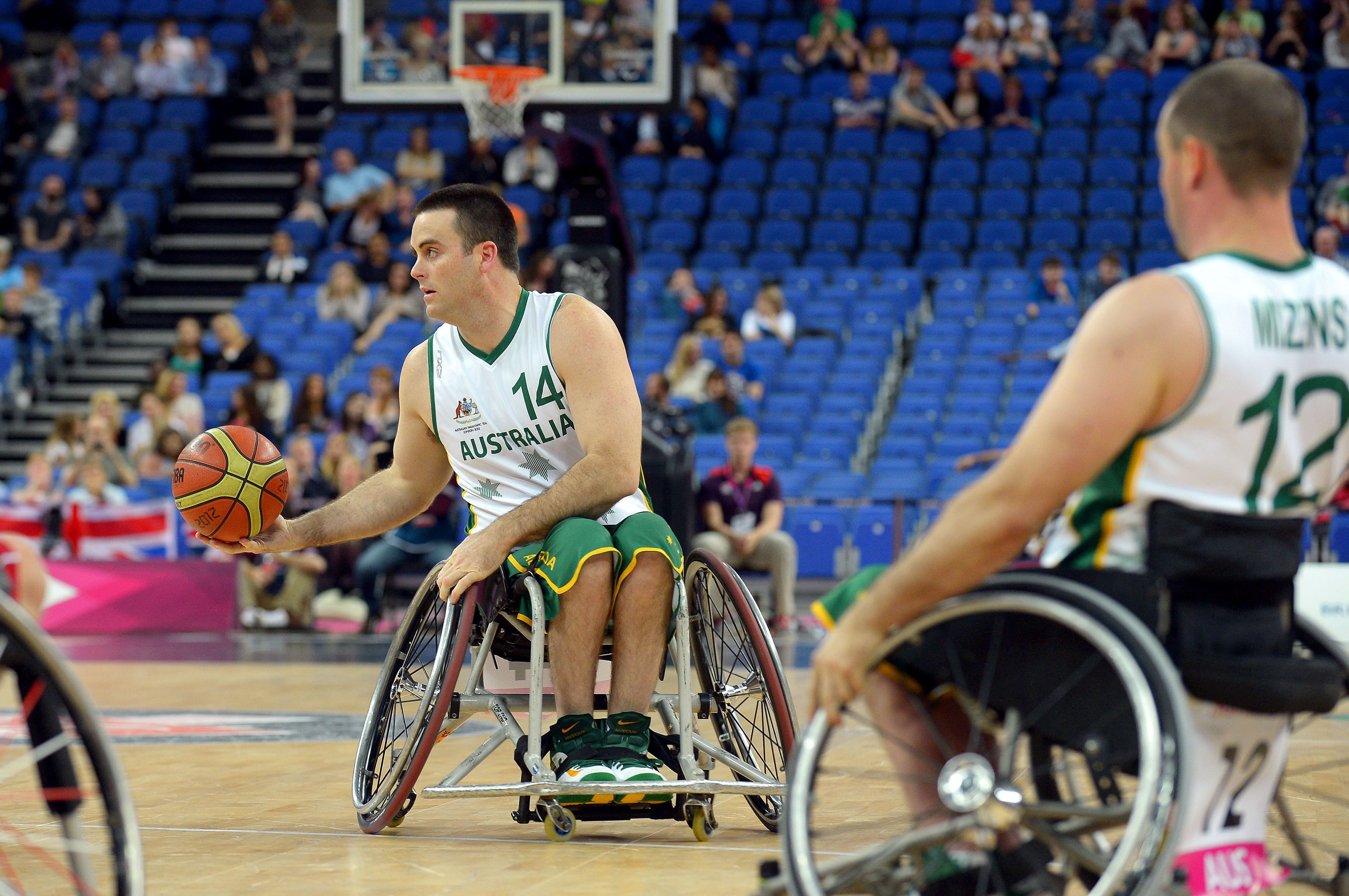
Taylor at the 2012 London Paralympics

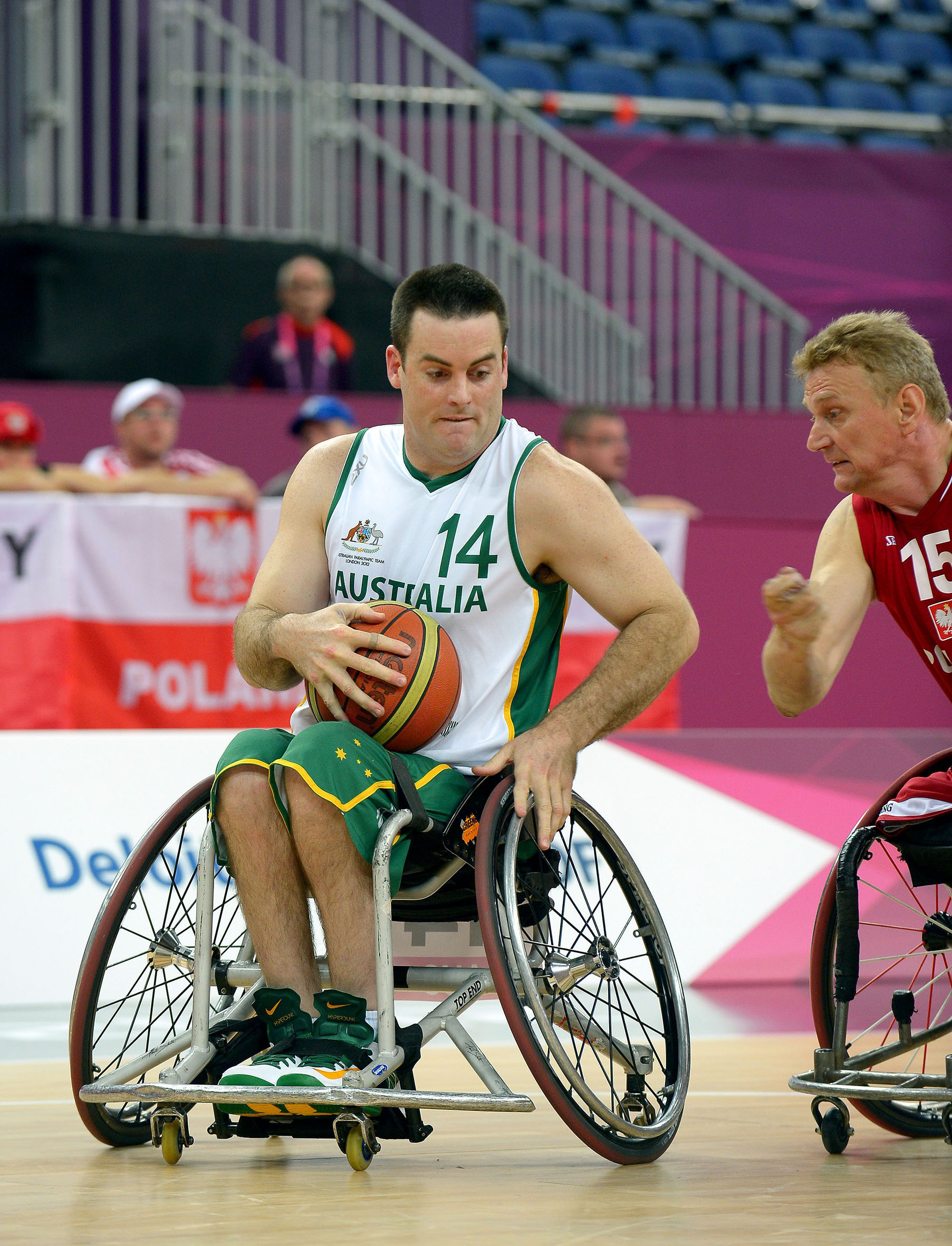
Taylor at the 2012 London Paralympics

Taylor is a wheelchair basketball player, playing in the shooting guard position. He started playing wheelchair basketball in 2002. He earned the 2010 Frank Ponta Trophy.

Taylor played wheelchair basketball for the University of Texas at Arlington in 2002 with future Australian national team teammate Brad Ness.

Taylor played for the Wollongong Roller Hawks in 2005. In 2012, he was still with the Roller Hawks, which won the National Wheelchair Basketball League in 2012. In his team's 75-59 semi-final win over the Wentley Wheelcats, he scored fourteen points. In the Grand Final, he scored fourteen points in a game that was played before a crowd of 500.

Taylor played for the South African men's national wheelchair basketball team at the 2008 Summer Paralympics.

Taylor first made the Australian national team in 2009, making his debut at the Rollers & Gliders World Challenge. He was selected to represent Australia at the 2012 Summer Paralympics in wheelchair basketball. Going into the London Paralympics, his team was ranked number one in the world. He had to earn his spot as fourteen men had been vying for spots on the team.

At the 2012 Summer Paralympics he was part of the Australian men's wheelchair team that won silver. He was a member of the Rollers team that won the gold medal at the 2014 Wheelchair Basketball World Championships .

== Golf ==
In February 2022, Taylor won the inaugural Australian Wheelchair Championship.
