= Tige Simmons =

Australian wheelchair basketball player

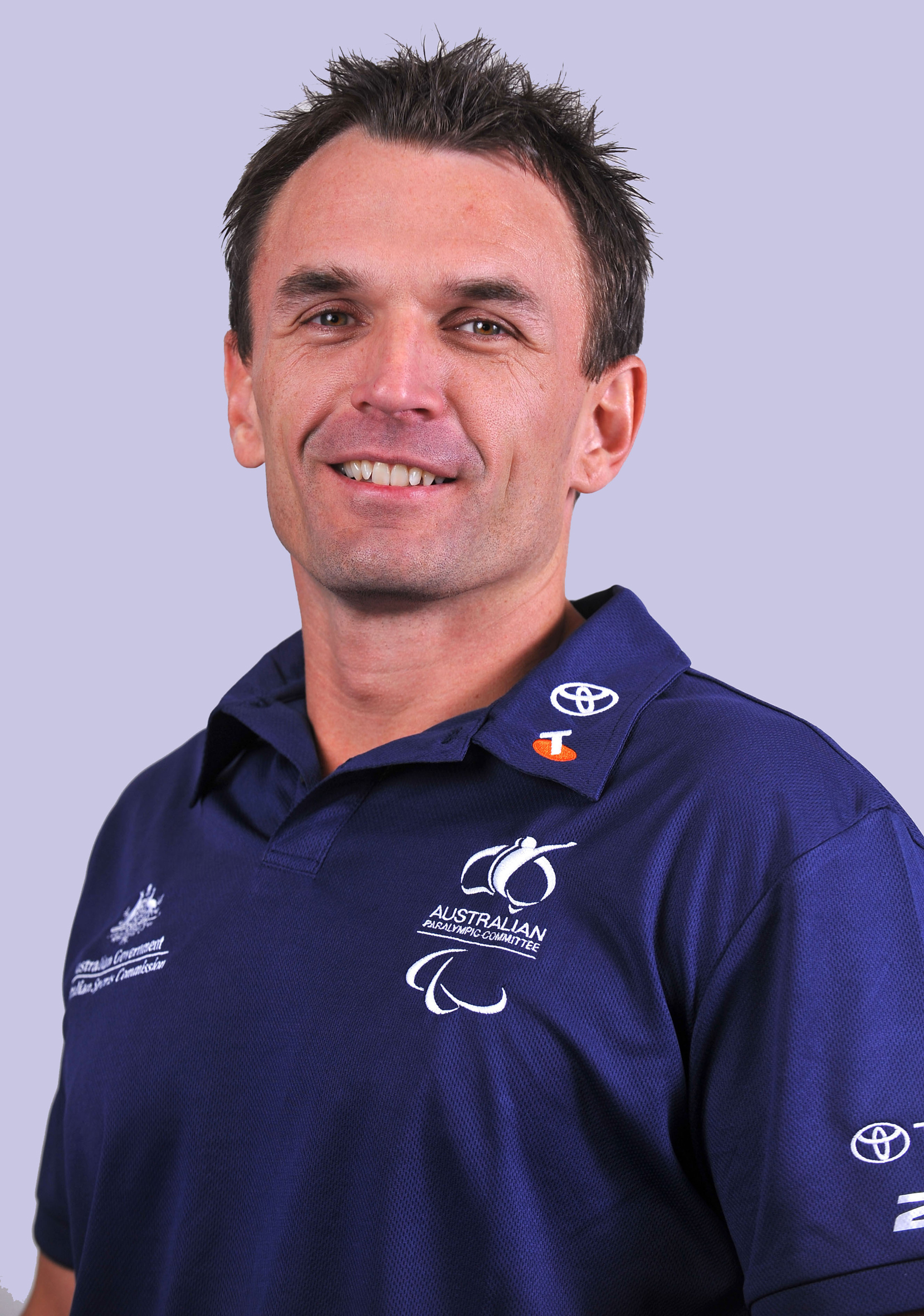
- Simmons, 2012 Australian Paralympic team portrait

Personal information
- Full name: Tige Arthur Simmons
- Nationality: Australia
- Born: 5 May 1977 (age 49)
- Spouse: Rachel Simmons
Medal record
Wheelchair basketball
Paralympic Games
Gold medal – first place	2008 Beijing	Men's wheelchair basketball
Silver medal – second place	2012 London	Men's wheelchair basketball
World Championship
Bronze medal – third place	2006 Amsterdam	Team
Gold medal – first place	2010 Birmingham	Team

Tige Arthur Simmons, OAM (born 5 May 1977) is an Australian wheelchair basketball player who represented Australia in the 2008, 2012 and 2016 Paralympic Games.

== Biography ==
Tige Simmons became a paraplegic due to a motorbike accident. He was part of the gold medal-winning Australian men's national wheelchair basketball team at the 2008 Summer Paralympics, for which he received a Medal of the Order of Australia.

He was a member of the Australian Men's National Wheelchair Basketball team that competed at the 2010 Wheelchair Basketball World Championship that won a gold medal.

He plays as a guard and is classified as a 1.0 player.

In 2010, he was playing club basketball with the Brisbane Spinning Bullets.

At the 2012 Summer Paralympics he was part of the Australian men's wheelchair team that won silver. In 2016, he was selected for the 2016 Summer Paralympics in Rio de Janeiro where his team, The Rollers, finished sixth.

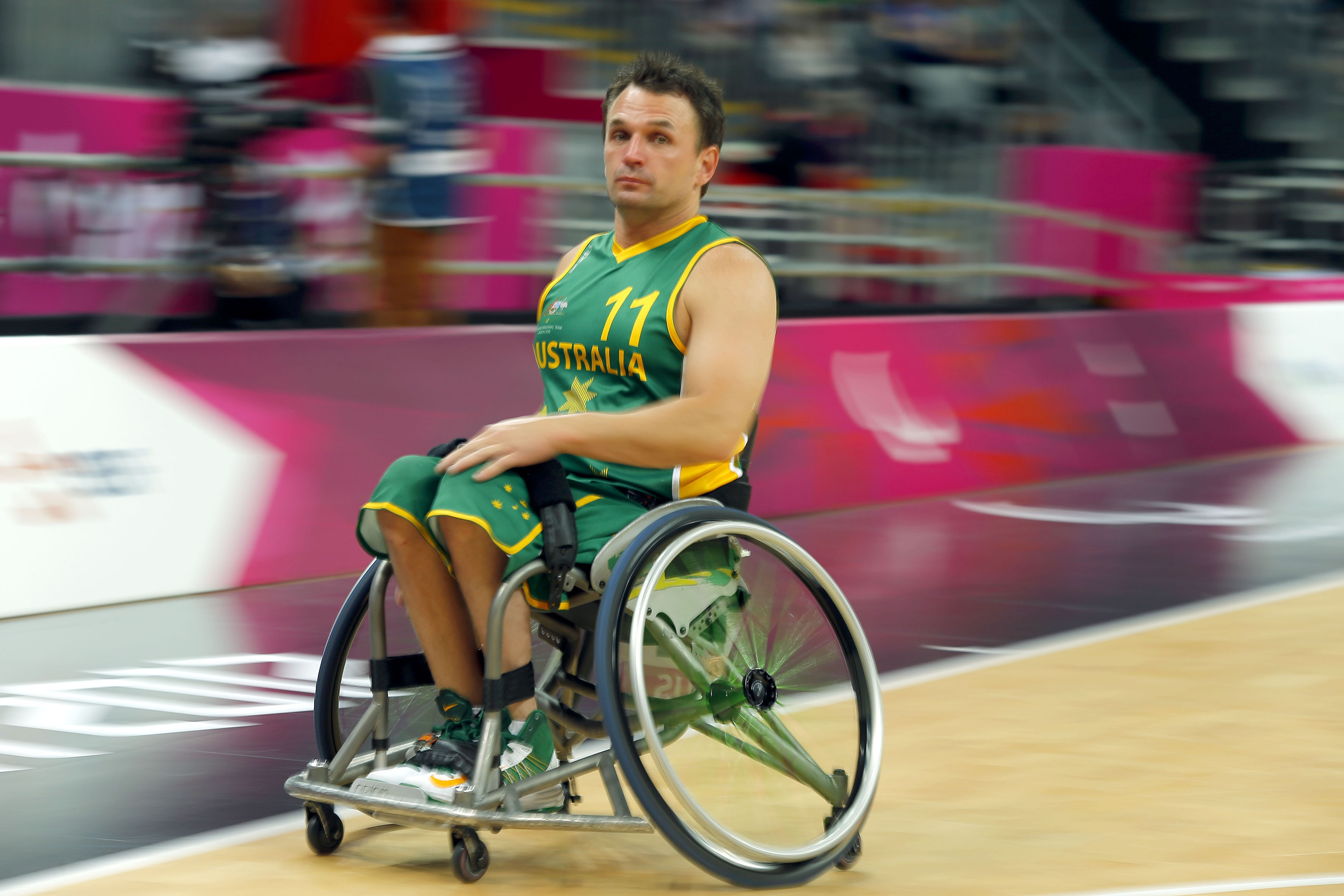
Simmons at the 2012 London Paralympics
