= Frank Pinder =

Australian basketball player

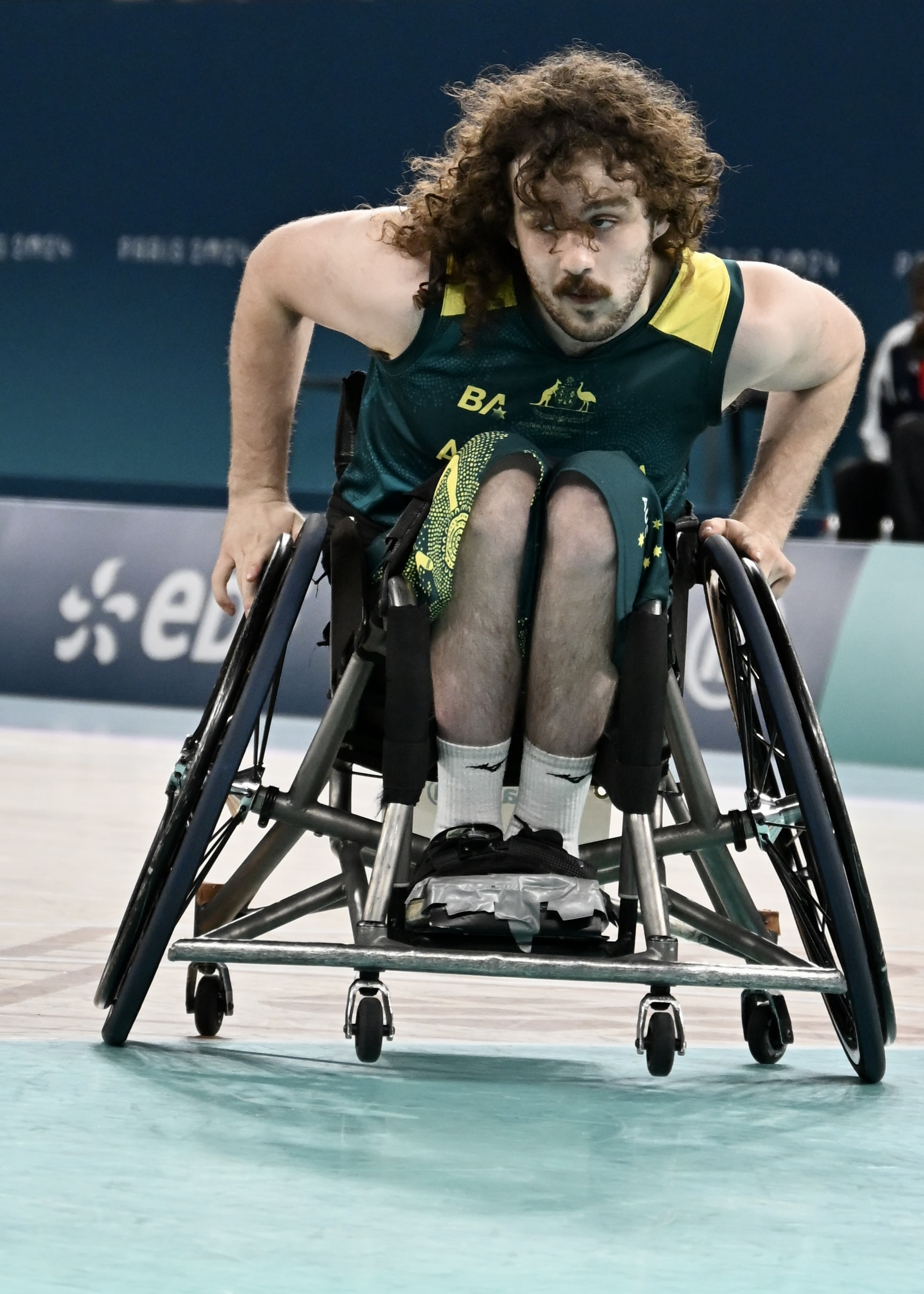
- Pinder at the 2024 Summer Paralympics

Personal information
- Nationality: Australia
- Born: 17 December 2000 (age 25)

Sport
- Disability class: 1.0
- Club: Perth Wheelcats
Medal record
World Championship
Gold medal – first place	2026 Ottawa	Team

Frank Pinder (born 17 December 2000) is a 1.0 point wheelchair basketball player from Australia. He was a member of the Rollers at the 2024 Paris Paralympics.

== Early life ==
Pinder was born on 17 December 2000. He broke his back at the age of fifteen. Pinder has a digital art qualification and in 2024 works for Innogreen Technologies – a Perth business offering affordable smart accessible technology solutions.

== Basketball career ==
He took up wheelchair basketball after his accident. He made his Rollers team debut at the 2022 Wheelchair Basketball World Championships in Dubai where they finished seventh. He was a member of the Rollers team at the 2024 IWBF Asia-Oceania Championships in Thailand, where they won the gold medal and qualified for 2024 Summer Paralympics.

At the 2024 Paris Paralympics, he was a member of the Rollers that finished fifth with a win/loss record of 4-4. He was a member of the Rollers that defeated Italy 81 - 57 to win the gold medal at the 2026 Wheelchair Basketball World Championships in Ottawa, Canada. He was selected in the tournament's All-Star Five.
