= Steven Elliott =

Australian wheelchair basketball player

Steven Elliot
Personal information
- Nationality: Australia
- Born: 22 February 1995 (age 31)

Sport
- Position: Point guard
- Disability class: 4.0
Medal record
World Championship
Gold medal – first place	2026 Ottawa	Team
Bronze medal – third place	2018 Hamburg	Team

Steven Elliott (born 22 February 1995) is a wheelchair basketball player from Australia.

== Biography ==
Elliott was born on 22 February 1995. He contracted transverse myelitis. in 2018, he is studying Sports Studies degree at the University of the Sunshine Coast.

He took up wheelchair basketball at fourteen. Elliott was a member of the Spinners, the Australian under-23 wheelchair basketball team that won the bronze medal at the world championships in Toronto, Canada. In 2018, he was a member of the Rollers that won the bronze medal at 2018 Wheelchair Basketball World Championship in Hamburg, Germany.

Elliott was a member of the Rollers that defeated Italy 81 - 57 to win the gold medal at the 2026 Wheelchair Basketball World Championships in Ottawa, Canada.

He is a member of Queensland Spinning Bullets in the National Wheelchair Basketball League.
