= Richard Oliver (Paralympian) =

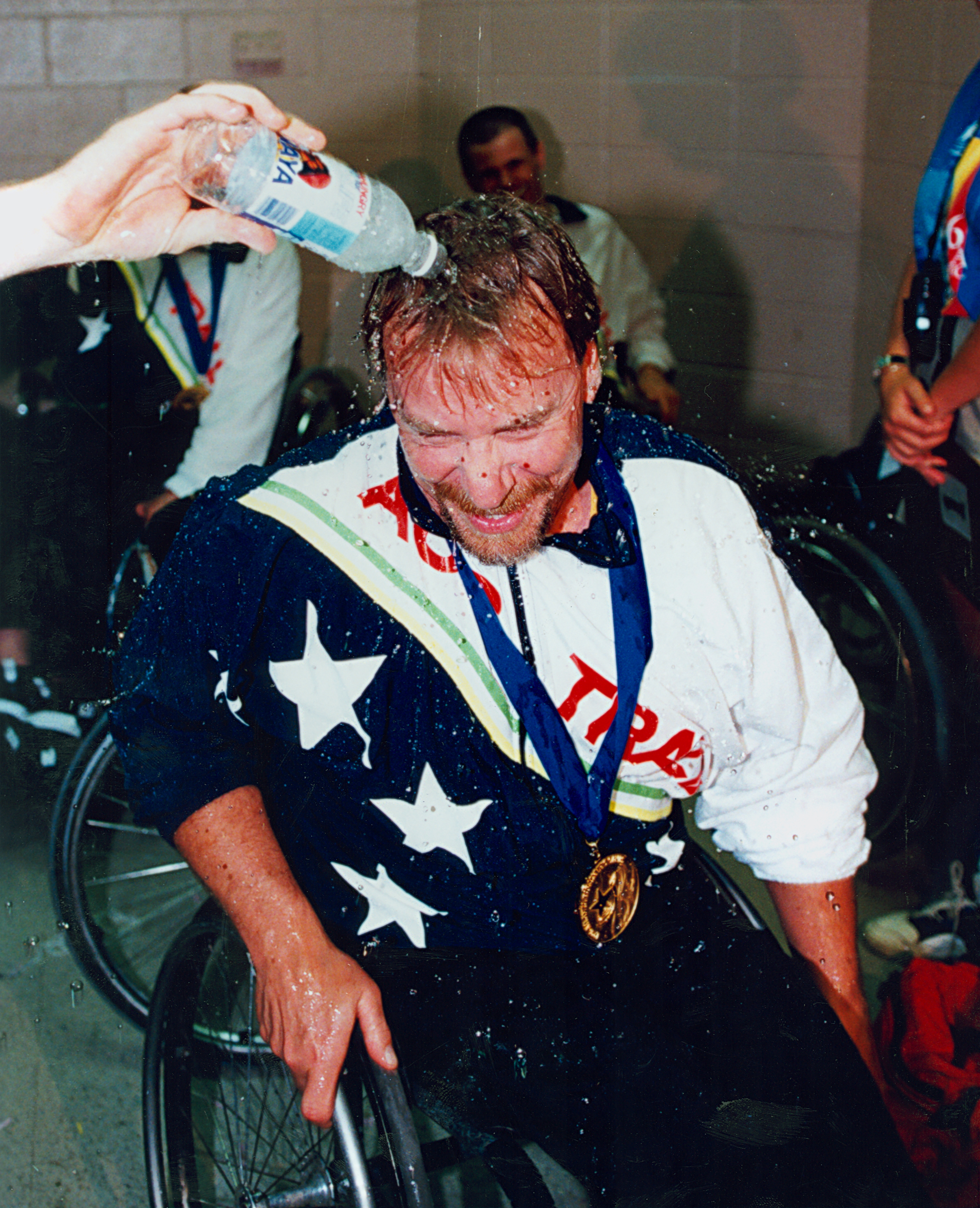
- Richard Oliver is sprayed with water after being presented with the gold medal at the Atlanta Paralympics

Personal information
- Full name: Richard Alden Oliver
- Nationality: Australian
- Born: 16 April 1955 (age 71) Gawler, South Australia
Medal record
Representing Australia
Paralympic Games
Men's para-athletics
| Bronze medal – third place | 1980 Arnhem | 100 m 4 |
Men's wheelchair basketball
| Gold medal – first place | 1996 Atlanta | Team competition |

Richard Alden Oliver, OAM (born 16 April 1955) is an Australian Paralympic athlete and wheelchair basketball player. He was born in the South Australian town of Gawler. He participated in athletics at both the 1976 Toronto and 1980 Arnhem Paralympics, winning a bronze medal in 1980 in the Men's 100 m 4 event. He held the world records in the 100 m and 200 m events. He was part of the Australia men's national wheelchair basketball team at all Paralympics from 1976 to 1996. He won a gold medal as part of the winning team at the 1996 Atlanta Paralympics, for which he received a Medal of the Order of Australia.
