= Jaylen Brown (wheelchair basketball) =

Australian basketball player (born 2004)

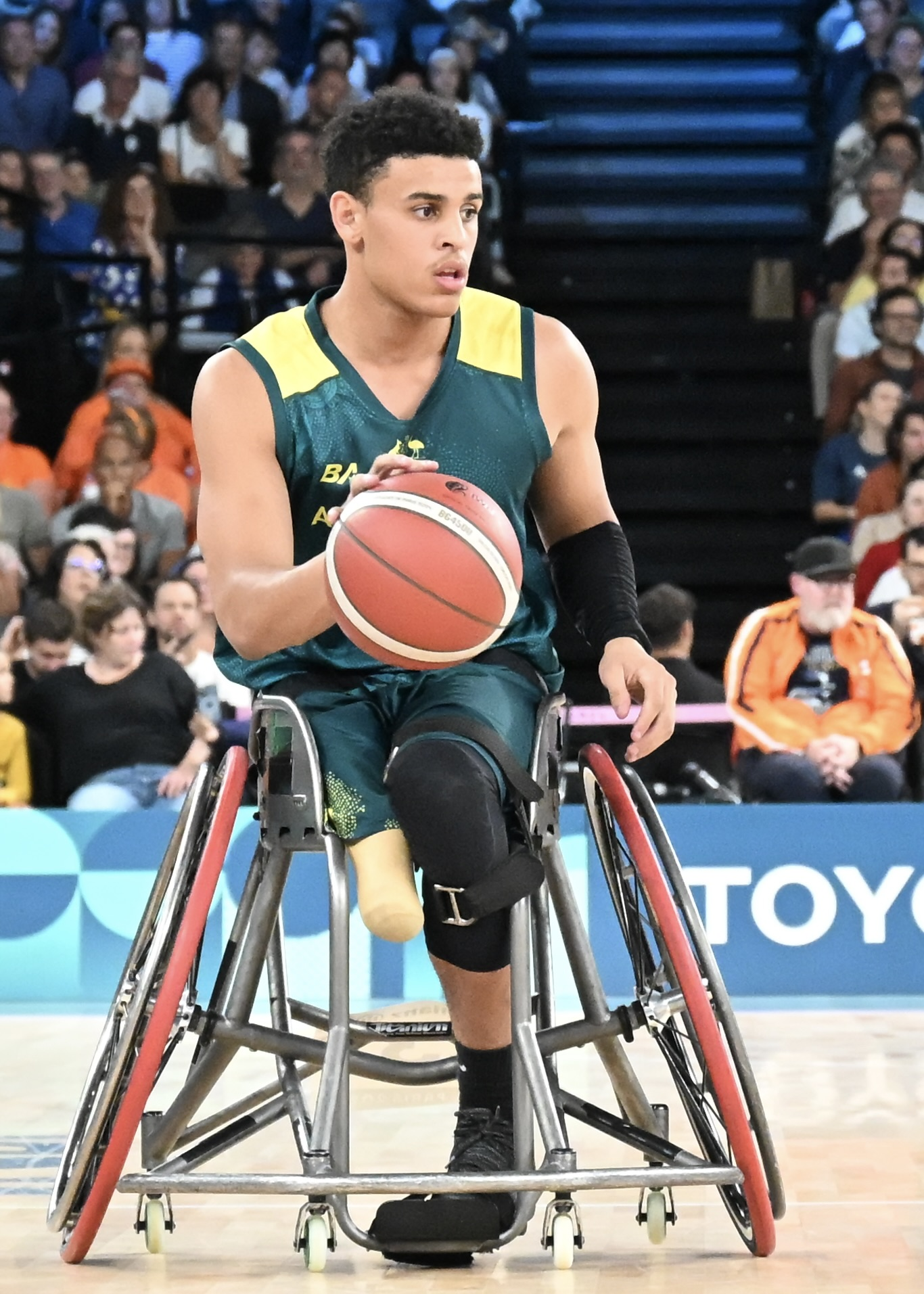
- Brown at the 2024 Summer Paralympics

Personal information
- Nationality: Australia
- Born: 22 December 2004 (age 21)

Sport
- Disability class: 4.0
- Club: Darwin Salties
Medal record
World Championship
| Gold medal – first place | 2026 Ottawa | Team |

Jaylen Brown (born 22 December 2004) is a 4.0 point wheelchair basketball player from Australia. He was a member of the Rollers at the 2024 Paris Paralympics.

== Biography ==
Brown was born on 22 December 2004. His home town is Warrnambool, Victoria. He had a leg amputation at the age of two and has a prosthetic leg. He attended St Pius Primary School and Emmanuel College. His mother Louise played as a point guard in the Women's National Basketball League. He is a nephew of AFL player Jonathon Brown.

== Basketball ==
He started playing wheelchair basketball at seven with his mother playing a significant role in coaching him. He was a member of the Victorian under 23 wheelchair basketball team which came from behind to secure a 68–60 victory over Western Australia to claim the state's maiden Kevin Coombs Cup in 2018. Brown was a member of the Spinners at the 2022 IWBF U23 World Wheelchair Basketball Championship in Thailand, where the team finished fifth. He was the Spinners' leading point scorer for the tournament, finishing in the top-10 overall for points scored (110) and top-five for points per game (19.6).

At the 2024 Paris Paralympics, he was a member of the Rollers that finished fifth with a win/loss record of 4-4. In 2024, he was awarded a Victorian Institute of Sport Coach Award.

He was a member of the Rollers that defeated Italy 81 - 57 to win the gold medal at the 2026 Wheelchair Basketball World Championships in Ottawa, Canada. He was named the 2026 IWBF Wheelchair Basketball World Championship MVP.

In 2024, he is a Victorian Institute of Sport scholarship athlete.

== Australian football ==
In 2020, Brown was selected by Hawthorn in the Victorian Wheelchair Football League draft. As a 15-year-old, he was the youngest VWFL draftee. He played able-bodied football for Hampden league club for Koroit.

== Recognition ==
- 2026 - Victorian Institute of Sport Para Athlete of the Year
