= Jeremy Tyndall =

Australian basketball player

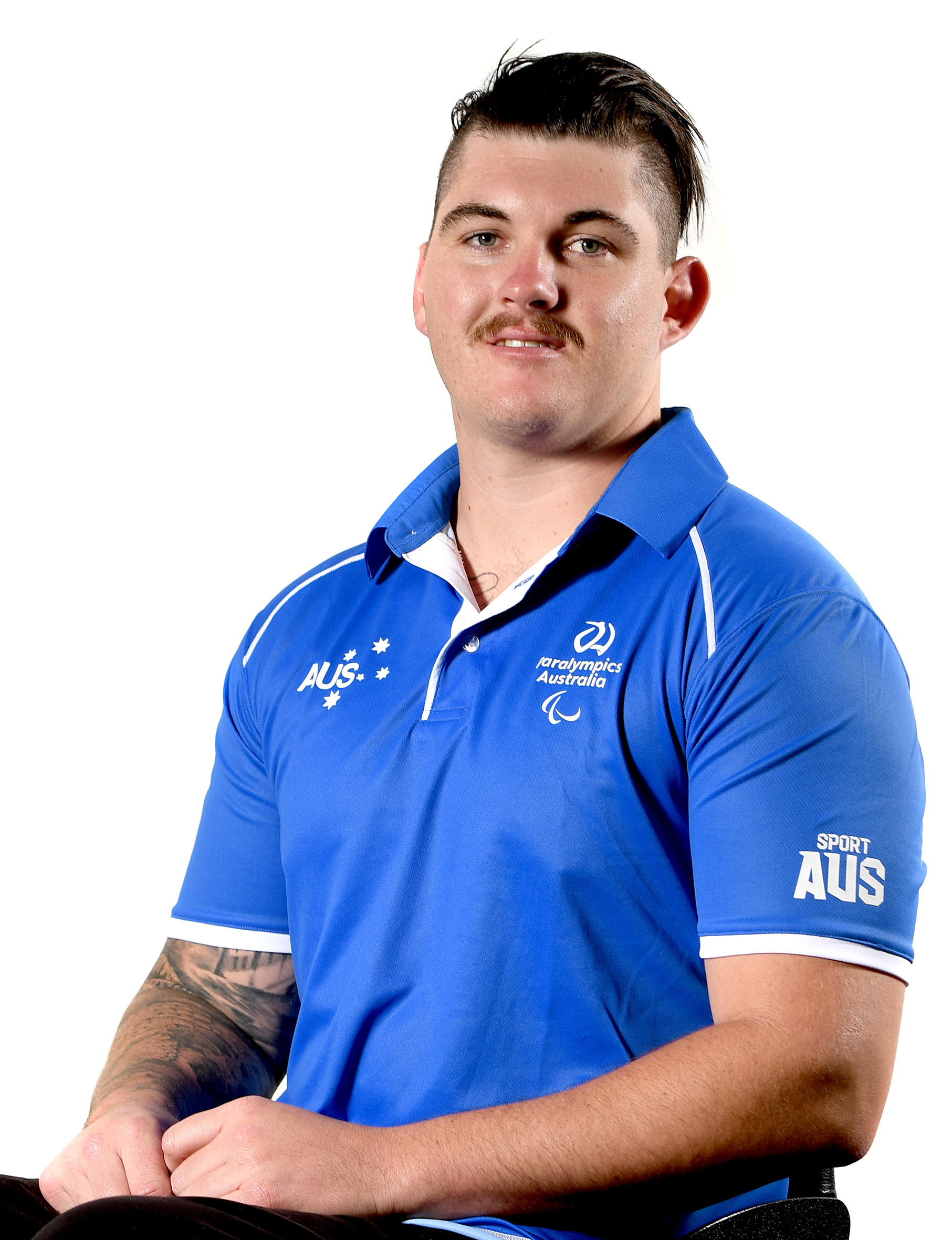
- Jeremy Tyndall in 2019

Personal information
- Nationality: Australia
- Born: 5 April 1996 (age 30)

Sport
- Position: Guard
- Disability class: 1.5
- Club: Kilsyth Cobras

Jeremy Tyndall (born 5 April 1996) is a 1.5 point wheelchair basketball player from Australia. He was a member of the Rollers team that competed at the 2020 Summer Paralympics.

== Biography ==
Tyndall is from Waaia, Victoria. In 2012, at the age of 16, he acquired T10 level paraplegia after crashing at the Junior Motocross Championships. He attended St Mary of the Angels Secondary College in Nathalia. He has undertaken a teaching degree at La Trobe University.

== Basketball ==
He is a 1.5 point player. He became a member of the Australian Spinners junior men's wheelchair basketball team three years after taking up wheelchair basketball. The team won the bronze medal at U23 World Championships in Toronto.

At the 2020 Tokyo Paralympics, the Rollers finished fifth with a win/loss record of 4-4. He was a member of the Rollers that defeated Italy 81 - 57 to win the gold medal at the 2026 Wheelchair Basketball World Championships in Ottawa, Canada.
