= Orfeo Cecconato =

Australian wheelchair basketball player

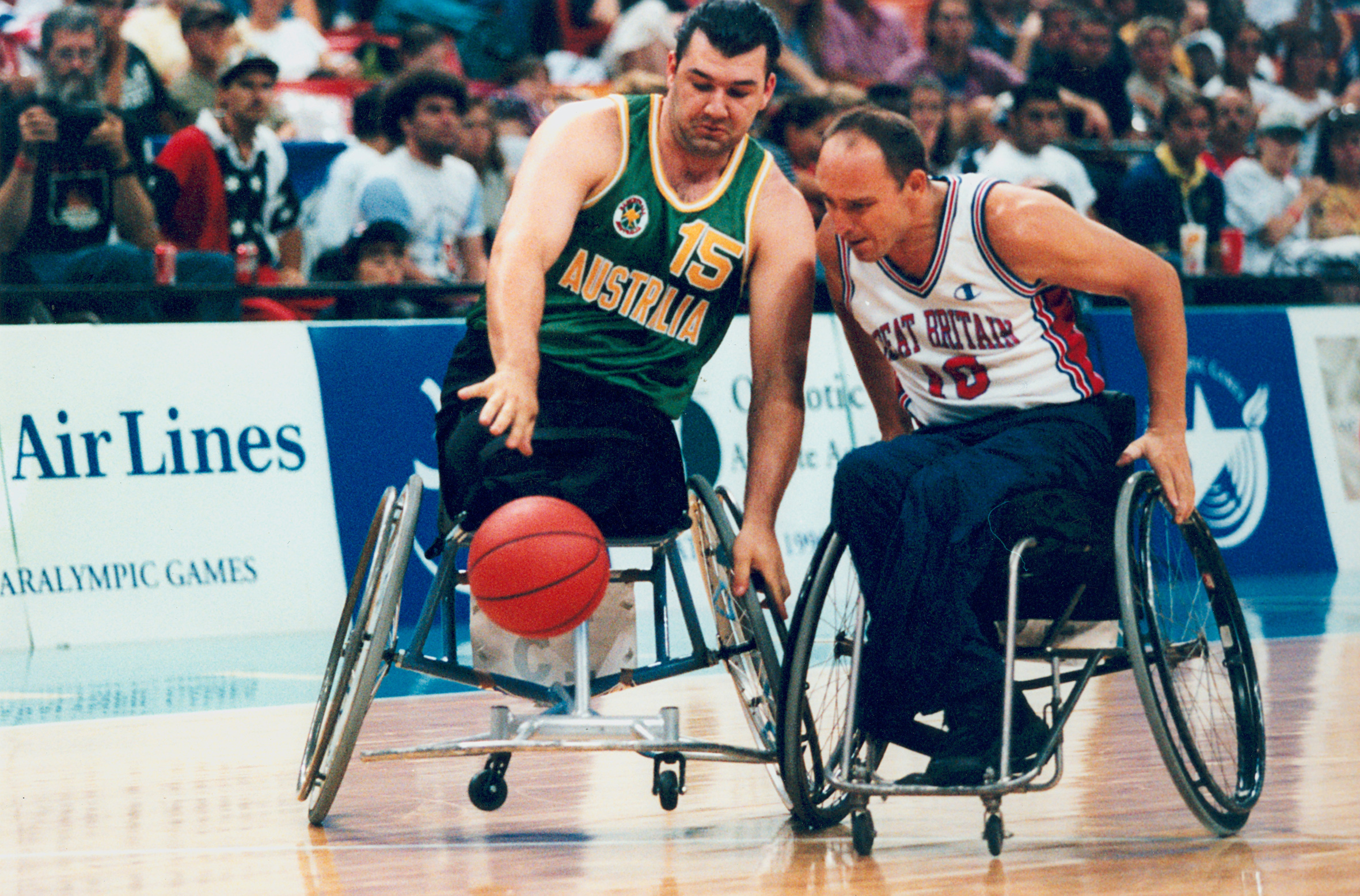

Personal information
- Full name: Orfeo Cecconato
- Nationality: Australia
- Born: 1 November 1969 (age 56) Melbourne, Victoria
Medal record
Wheelchair basketball
Paralympic Games
Gold medal – first place	1996 Atlanta	Men's wheelchair basketball

Orfeo Cecconato, OAM (born 1 November 1969) is an Australian wheelchair basketball player. He was born in Melbourne, Victoria. He was part of the gold medal-winning Australia men's national wheelchair basketball team at the 1996 Summer Paralympics, for which he received a Medal of the Order of Australia. In 2000, he received an Australian Sports Medal.
