= Mogo Wheelchairs =

Manufacturer of sporting wheelchairs

Mogo Wheelchairs is an Australian manufacturer of sporting wheelchairs established by Michael Callahan who competed in wheelchair basketball for Australia at the 1984 Summer Paralympics and 1992 Summer Paralympics.

== Origins ==
Callahan wasn't able to find suitable chairs for competitive wheelchair basketball, and started building his own in the early 1980s. In 2000 Callahan reported to Sydney Morning Herald that his company was building 600 to 700 chairs a year at around AUD 2,000 per chair, and almost all of Australia's wheelchair basketball team was using his chairs.

Mogo pioneered the inclusion of a fifth wheel that is now standard in wheelchair basketball.

== Advocacy ==
Double amputee, Paralympian and public speaker Matt Glowacki is their advocate in the United States.

== See also ==
- Surgical Engineering
