= Nick Morris (basketball) =

Australian wheelchair basketball player

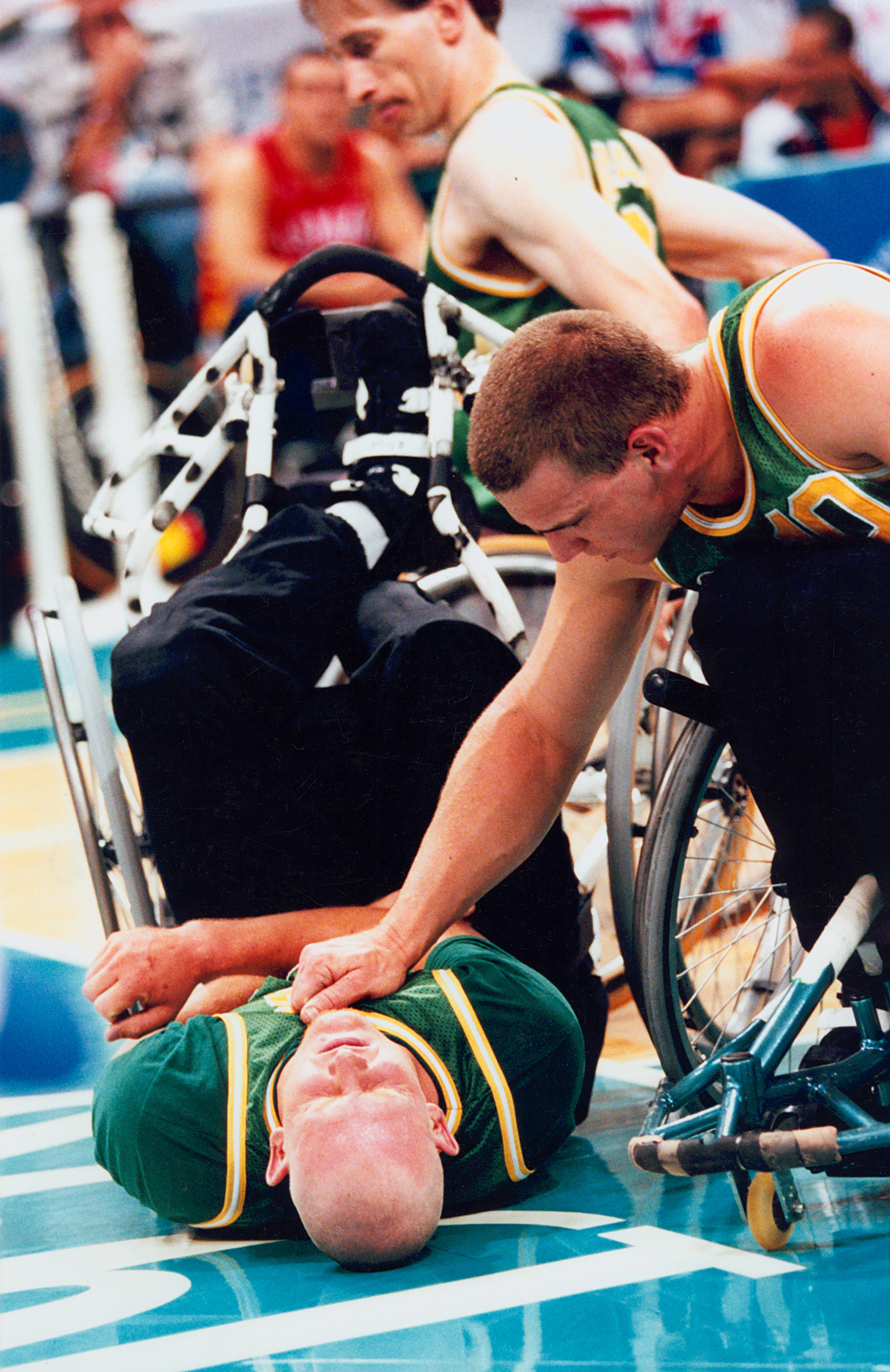
- Australian men's wheelchair basketball team members Troy Sachs (on the floor), Nick Morris and Sandy Blythe at the 1996 Atlanta Paralympics

Personal information
- Full name: Nicholas Hugh Morris
- Nationality: Australian
- Born: 16 August 1971 (age 54) Wangaratta, Australia
Medal record
Men's wheelchair basketball
Representing Australia
Paralympic Games
Gold medal – first place	1996 Atlanta	Team competition

Nicholas Hugh "Nick" Morris, OAM (born 16 August 1971) is an Australian wheelchair basketball player. He was born in the Victorian town of Wangaratta. He was a member of the Australian team that won gold at the 1996 Summer Paralympics in Atlanta, for which he received a Medal of the Order of Australia. He was also a member of the Australian wheelchair basketball squad at the 2000 Summer Paralympics. Morris was injured in a motorcycle accident at age 16 and credits his involvement in sport as the key to his rehabilitation.

Morris received an Australian Sports Medal in 2000 for his many years service to the Paralympic movement as a Basketball athlete.

In his professional capacity, Morris sat on the Australian Standards Committee for Access provisions (AS1428) and is a director of Morris Goding Accessibility Consulting (MGAC). In 1999 he established "accessibility.com.au", a website dedicated to providing information about accessible venues, facilities, services, transport and news.

In 2006 Morris co-invented the Vulcan Wheel, ergonomically designed one-piece extruded aluminium wheelchair wheel for use in general travel and sport. The invention was featured on the ABC New Inventors program.

From 2003 to 2011, Morris was an advisor to the International Paralympic Committee on accessibility and universal design to bid and organising committees. In particular his work on the Sydney 2000 and Beijing 2008 Olympics and Paralympics.

From 2012 onwards Nick as a director of MGAC, continued to provide accessibility and Universal Design advice to events, major developments and infrastructure in Australia and internationally.

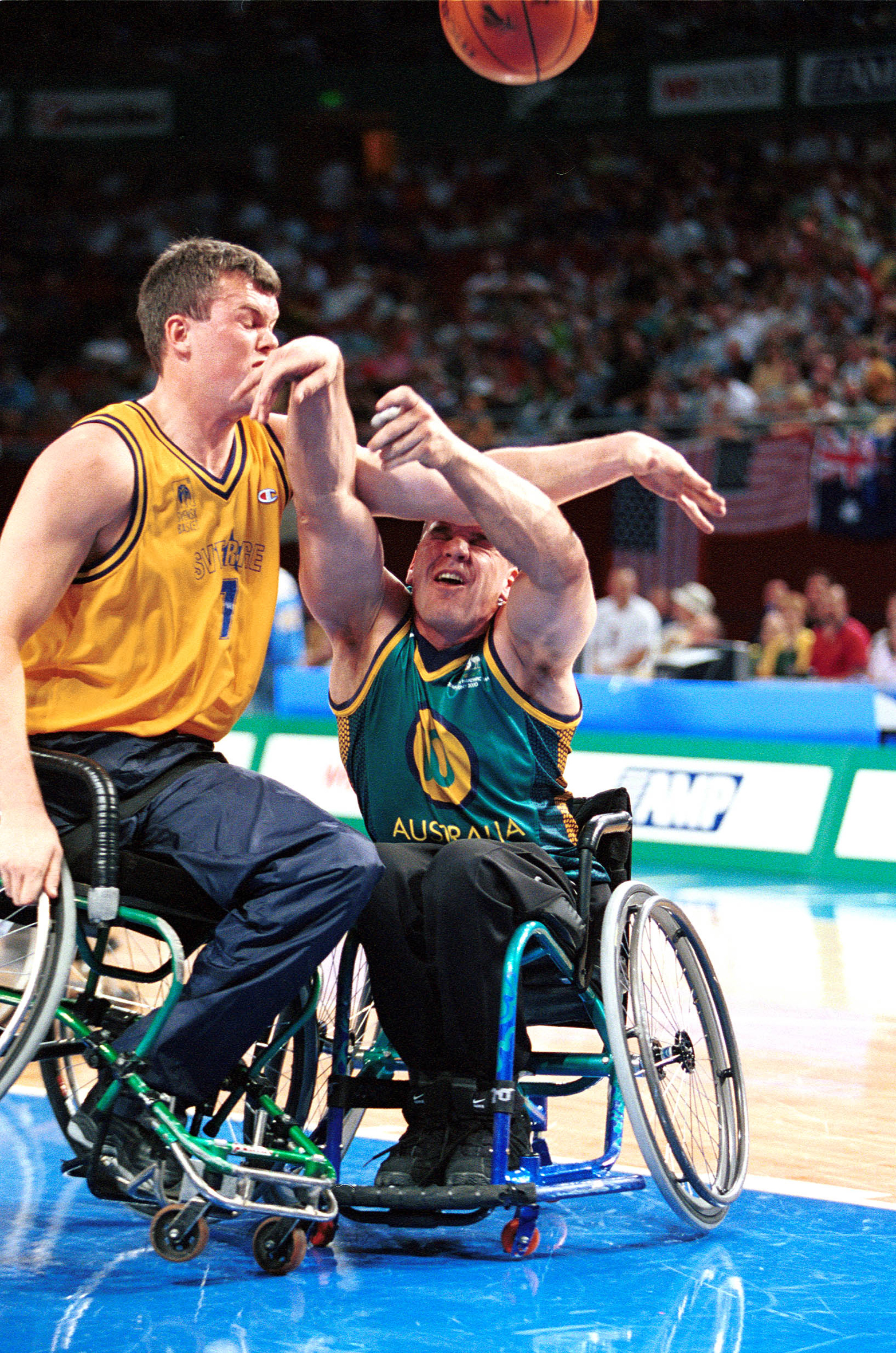
Morris is hit during competition at the 2000 Sydney Paralympics
