= Tom McHugh (basketball) =

Australian basketball player

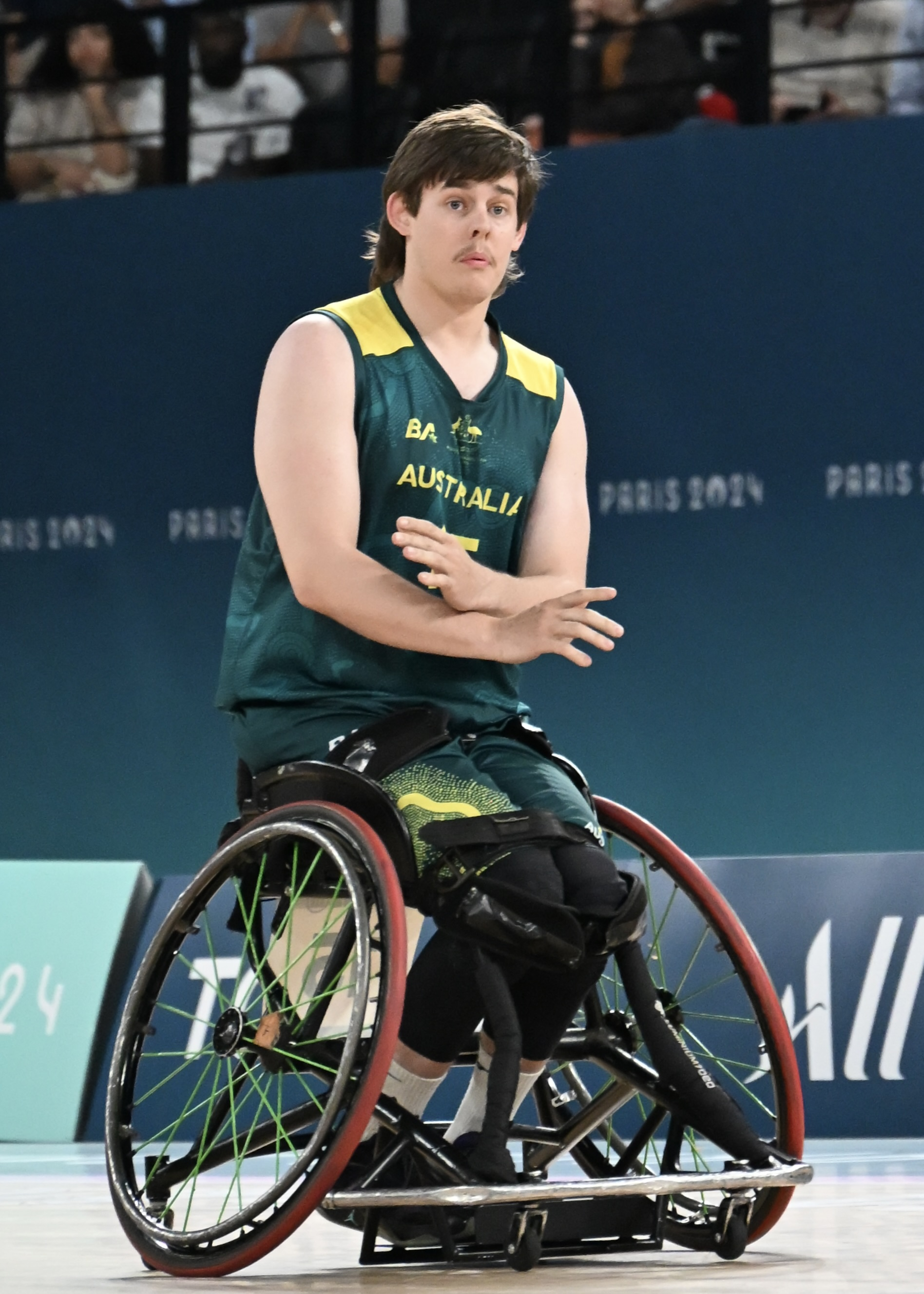
- McHugh at the 2024 Summer Paralympics

Personal information
- Full name: Thomas McHugh
- Nationality: Australia
- Born: 13 March 2002 (age 24)

Sport
- Disability class: 4.5
- Club: Perth Wheelcats

Thomas "Tom" McHugh (born 13 March 2002) is a 4.5-point wheelchair basketball player from Australia. He was a member of the Rollers at the 2024 Paris Paralympics.

== Early life ==
McHugh was born on 13 March 2002 with bone and tissue issues and this led him to using a wheelchair to play sport. He attended Swan Valley Anglican Community School.

In 2017, he was awarded Wally Foreman Foundation scholarship.

== Basketball career ==
In 2016, at the age of 14, he was the youngest member of the Spinners, Australia's under-23 wheelchair basketball team. He was a member of the Rollers team at the 2024 IWBF Asia-Oceania Championships in Thailand, where they won the gold medal and qualified for 2024 Summer Paralympics.

He has played in the German Wheelchair Basketball club with Hannover United and helped them win the 2023 EuroCup3 title for the first time.

At the 2024 Paris Paralympics, he was a member of the Rollers that finished fifth with a win/loss record of 3-3.
