= National Wheelchair Basketball League (Australia) =

Australian mixed wheelchair basketball league

- Sport: wheelchair basketball
- Founded: 1988
- No. of teams: 7
- Country: Australia
- Most recent champion: Darwin Salties (2025)
- Most titles: Perth Wheelcats (8)

The National Wheelchair Basketball League (NWBL) is Australia's premier male wheelchair basketball league. It was established in 1988.

The competition seasons in 2020 and 2021 were not completed due to the COVID-19 pandemic with no team declared the winner for either season. The 2023 Season was replaced with a Tournament style format which was not part of the NWBL.

In 2024 Basketball Australia announced the formation of Wheelchair Basketball Australia to manage the Men's and Women's National Wheelchair Basketball Leagues in Australia, with the NWBL and WNWBL competitions to re-commence.

== Rules ==
Games are played in accordance with International Wheelchair Basketball Federation (IWBF) Rules with some minor variations:

- While the NWBL is a predominantly Male competition, the league also permits Female players.
- Players are classified in accordance with IWBF procedures, except that teams can apply to Wheelchair Basketball Australia for certain players to be "Red Card Players". The following players are eligible to be Red Card Players:
  - Rookie Players (First Season in NWBL)
  - Junior Players (Under 23 Years of age as at the end of the playing year)
  - Female Players

(Junior or Rookie players who have represented their country at an international competition are not eligible for a Red Card.)

- Each team may have up to 14 Points on the court at any one time, except that for each Red Card Player teams may have 1 additional point on the court (up to a maximum of 2 additional points). Teams may not have two 4.5 point players on the court at once (unless one is a Red Card Player).

In 2024, each team will play each other team 3 times in the Season with the top 4 teams playing in the Finals Weekend at one venue.

== 2024 teams ==
Team	Location	Joined	Titles	Website
Adelaide Thunder	Adelaide, SA	1988 (Founding Team)	6 (Inaugural Champions)	
Darwin Salties	Darwin, NT	2022	0* (2023 Wheelchair Leagues Cup Champions)	
Manly Wheel Eagles	Northern Beaches, Sydney, NSW	2024	0	
Perth Wheelcats	Perth, WA	1988 (Founding Team)	8	
Red Dust Heelers	Country VIC	2013	0	
Southern District Spartans	Brisbane, QLD	2024	0	
Wollongong Roller Hawks	Wollongong, NSW	2001	7	

=== Former Teams ===
- Aussie Spinners
- Dandenong Rangers
- Kilsyth Cobras
- Queensland Spinning Bullets
- Sydney Comets
- Sydney Metro Blue Hornets
- West Sydney Slix
- West Sydney Razorbacks

== Champions ==
Year	Team	Reference
1988	Adelaide 86ers	
1989	Sydney Cobras	
1990	Adelaide Steam	
1991	Adelaide Steam	
1992	Sydney Slix	
1993	Adelaide Thunder	
1994	Adelaide Thunder	
1995	Adelaide Thunder	
1996	Sydney Comets	
1997	West Sydney Slix	
1998	West Sydney Slix	
1999	Sydney Comets	
2000	Dandenong Rangers	
2001	West Sydney Razorbacks	
2002	Perth Wheelcats	
2003	Wollongong Rollerhawks	
2004	West Sydney Razorbacks	
2005	West Sydney Razorbacks	
2006	Perth Wheelcats	
2007	Perth Wheelcats	
2008	Perth Wheelcats	
2009	Perth Wheelcats	
2010	Perth Wheelcats	
2011	Wollongong Rollerhawks	
2012	Wollongong Rollerhawks	
2013	Perth Wheelcats	
2014	Perth Wheelcats	
2015	Kilsyth Cobras	
2016	Kilsyth Cobras	
2017	Wollongong Rollerhawks	
2018	Wollongong Rollerhawks	
2019	Wollongong Rollerhawks	
2020	Season Abandoned	
2021	Season Abandoned	
2022	Wollongong Rollerhawks	
2023	Darwin Salties	
2024	Darwin Salties	
2025	Darwin Salties	
