= Julia van der Sprong =

Dutch wheelchair basketball player (born 1999)

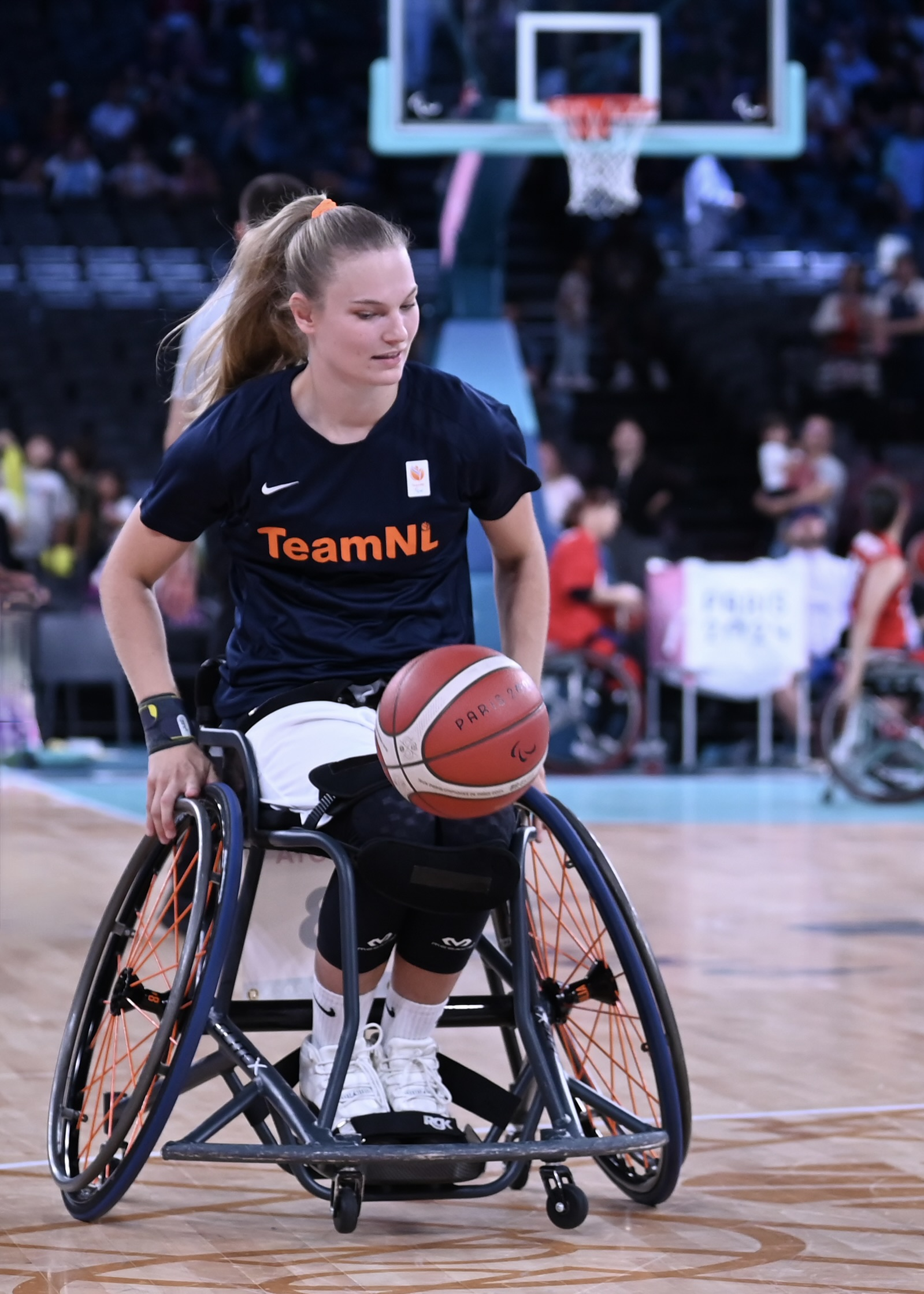

Personal information
- Born: 27 September 1999 (age 26) Gouda, South Holland, Netherlands

Sport
- Country: Netherlands
- Sport: Wheelchair basketball
- Disability: spinal cord injury
- Disability class: 3.5
- Club: DeVeDo
Medal record
Women's wheelchair basketball
Representing Netherlands
Paralympic Games
Gold medal – first place	2020 Tokyo	Team
Gold medal – first place	2024 Paris	Team
World Championships
Gold medal – first place	2018 Hamburg	Team
Gold medal – first place	2022 Dubai	Team
European Championships
Gold medal – first place	2019 Rotterdam	Team
Gold medal – first place	2021 Madrid	Team
Gold medal – first place	2023 Rotterdam	Team

Julia van der Sprong (born 27 September 1999) is a Dutch wheelchair basketball player (3.5 disability class). Van der Sprong plays for DeVeDo (Ermelo) where she plays as a forward.

In 2018, van der Sprong made her World Championship debut with the Dutch national team during the 2018 World Championship in Hamburg, where the Dutch team won gold. With the Dutch team, she also won gold at the 2020 Summer Paralympics in Tokyo and the 2022 World Championships in Dubai.

== Background ==
Van der Sprong was an active hockey player and speed skater in her youth. However, at the age of sixteen, she suffered a spinal cord injury as a result of an acute inflammation in her spinal cord. After her recovery, she could still run short distances, but could no longer play sports as before. During her rehabilitation, she was introduced to wheelchair basketball and turned out to have a talent for it. In addition to wheelchair basketball, Van der Sprong completed a Bachelor of Business Administration at Radboud University in Nijmegen.
