= Rabia Akyürek =

Turkish wheelchair basketball player (born 1999)

Rabia Akyürek (born Rabia Akyürek; 10 February 1999) is a Turkish wheelchair basketball player. She is part of the Turkey women's national wheelchair basketball team.

== Club career ==
Akyürek started playing wheelchair basketball in 2013 with the initiative of her physical education teacher.

She plays as the only female member in the Pendik Bld Anadolu Yakası SK in Istanbul.

Akyürek plays with disability class 2.0.

== International career ==
Akhyürek played for the Turkey women's natioanal under-25 wheelchair basketball team at the 2019 Women's U25 Wheelchair Basketball World Championship in Suphanburi, Thailand.

She is a member of the Turkey women's national wheelchair basketball team. She played at the European Wheelchair Basketball Championship in 2019 in Rotterdam, Netherlands, 2021 in Madrid, Spain, and in 2023 in Rotterdam, Netherlands.

== Personal life ==
Rabia Akyürek was born on 10 February 1999. She contracted spinal cord paralysis after heart surgery at the age of four. She lives in Istanbul.

She serves as a teacher of Religious Culture and Moral Knowledge at TOKİ Esenkent Middle School in Ümraniye, Istanbul, Turkey.
