= 2026 Wheelchair Basketball World Championships =

Wheelchair basketball tournament in Ottawa

2026 Wheelchair Basketball World Championship
- Venue: Carleton University; TD Place Arena
- Location: Ottawa, Canada
- Start date: 9 September 2026
- End date: 19 September 2026
- Competitors: 16 teams (men); 12 teams (women); from 20 nations

Australian Rollers celebrate their gold medal win

TD Place Arena during the 2026 Wheelchair Basketball World Championships

Carleton University Raven's Nest during the 2026 Wheelchair Basketball World Championships

The 2026 Wheelchair Basketball World Championships were held at Carleton University and the TD Place Arena in Ottawa, Canada, from 9 to 19 September 2026. Both men's and women's tournaments were played, with 12 women's and 16 men's teams competing, with athletes representing 21 different nations. Each team selected 12 players for the tournament. The men's competition was won by Australia, with Italy winning silver and Great Britain winning bronze. The women's competition was won by the United States, with Canada winning silver and the Netherlands winning bronze.

== Medallists ==
Event	Gold	Silver	Bronze
Men's team	Australia	Italy	Great Britain
Women's team	United States	Canada	Netherlands

== Qualification ==
Qualification was based on standings at the Paris 2024 Paralympic Games. Each Olympic zone had one place, and in both competitions one place was allocated to the Canada as the host nation. Additional places were earned by standings in Paris, not for the team, but for their zone. For the men, this resulted in one place for Africa, three for the Americas, two for Asia Oceania and five for Europe.

Great Britain, Italy, Germany, Spain and Turkiye qualified via the 2025 IWBF European Championships; USA, Argentina and Colombia through the 2025 IWBF Americas Cup; Australia and Japan through the 2025 IWBF Asia Oceania Championships; and Morocco through the 2025 IWBF Africa Championships. Four more teams qualified through the IWBF 2026 Men's Repechage: Poland, the Netherlands, Iran and Brazil.

Iran withdrew from the competition due to being unable to secure visas for four members of its delegation, including the head coach and assistant coach, although all twelve players and four other staff received their visas. It was not replaced, and it scheduled matches were regarded as forfeits.

For the women, there was one place for Africa, two for the Americas, two for Asia Oceania and two for Europe. The Netherlands and Great Britain qualified via the 2025 IWBF European Championships; USA and Brazil through the 2025 IWBF Americas Cup; China and Japan through the 2025 IWBF Asia Oceania Championships; and Algeria through the 2025 IWBF Africa Championships. Four more teams qualified through the Women’s Repechage for the 2026 World Championships: Spain, France, Germany and Australia.

== Pools composition ==
=== Women ===
Group A	Group B
Brazil	United States
China	Japan
Great Britain	Netherlands
Australia	Algeria
Spain	Germany
Canada (H)	France

=== Men ===
Group A	Group B	Group C	Group D
United States	Australia	Spain	Morocco
Italy	Great Britain	Japan	Germany
Brazil	Turkey	Poland	Iran (W)
Netherlands	Argentina	Colombia	Canada (H)

== Squads ==
Each of the 16 men's and 12 women's teams (from 20 different nations) selected a squad of 12 players for the tournament. Athletes are given an eight-level-score specific to wheelchair basketball, ranging from 0.5 to 4.5. Lower scores represent a higher degree of disability. The sum score of all players on the court cannot exceed 14.

== Women ==
=== Group A ===
Team	Pld	W	L	PF	PA	PD	Pts
Canada	5	5	0	393	271	+122	10
Great Britain	5	4	1	381	264	+117	9
Spain	5	3	2	274	315	-41	8
China	5	2	3	250	227	+23	7
Brazil	5	1	4	213	330	-117	6
Australia	5	0	5	197	301	-104	5

9 September 2026
09:45

Statistics

China	48–37	Australia
Scoring by quarter: 16-8, 26-14, 36-28, 48-37
Pts: X. Zhang, 20; Rebs: X. Zhang, 8 Asts: S. Lin, 9		Pts: G. Munro Cook, 12; Rebs: L. Davoli, 12; Asts: G. Munro Cook, 6

Carleton University

9 September 2026
14:00

Statistics

Brazil	41–78	Great Britain
Scoring by quarter: 5-23, 18-47, 25-66, 41-78
Rebs: P. Klokler, 5 Asts: L. Martins, 3		Pts: K. Morrow, 13; Rebs: R. Love, 7 Asts: L. Williams, 5

TD Place

9 September 2026
16:15

Statistics

Spain	51–76	Canada
Scoring by quarter: 21-15, 27-36, 37-59, 51-76
Pts: I. Lopez Chavez, 17; Rebs: I. Lopez Chavez, 11; Asts: B. Zudaire, 6		Pts: A. Young, 18; Rebs: K. Dandeneau, 14; Asts: A. Young, 6

TD Place

10 September 2026
14:30

Statistics

Australia	30–79	Canada
Scoring by quarter: 10-17, 19-35, 26-54, 30-79
Pts: G. Munro Cook, 13; Rebs: G. Munro Cook, 8 Asts: S. Matheson, 5		Pts: K. Dandeneau, 33; Rebs: A. Young, 14; Asts: K. Dandeneau, 6

Carleton University

10 September 2026
14:45

Statistics

Brazil	63–70	Spain
Scoring by quarter: 16-19, 28-37, 48-50, 63-70
Pts: B. Zudaire, 29; Rebs: G. Navarro Rodríguez , 6 Asts: B. Zudaire, 14		Pts: V. Almeida, 18; Rebs: V. Almeida, 5 Asts: V. Almeida, 7

TD Place

10 September 2026
19:15

Statistics

China	38–52	Great Britain
Scoring by quarter: 6-9, 12-26, 24-40, 38-52
Pts: X. Zhang, 10; Rebs: X. Zhang, 12; Asts: S. Lin, 8		Pts: L. Robinson, 13; Rebs: R. Love, 10; Asts: R. Love, 8

TD Place

12 September 2026
14:30

Statistics

Australia	41–44	Brazil
Scoring by quarter: 16-10, 28-23, 32-32, 41-44
Pts: L. Davoli, 16; Rebs: L. Davoli, 15; Asts: L. Davoli, 7		Pts: V. Almeida, 24; Rebs: V. Almeida, 9 Asts: V. Almeida, 4

Carleton University

12 September 2026
15:00

Statistics

Canada	66–62	China
Scoring by quarter: 16-18, 30-30, 47-46, 66-62
Pts: K. Dandeneau, 37; Rebs: A. Young, 10; Asts: A. Young, 10		Pts: S. Lin, 19; Rebs: X. Zhang, 13; Asts: S. Lin, 12

TD Place

12 September 2026
16:45

Statistics

Great Britain	85–54	Spain
Scoring by quarter: 21-17, 38-31, 63-39, 85-54
Pts: K. Morrow, 20; Rebs: R. Love, 8 Asts: L. Williams, 6		Pts: I. Lopez Chavez, 13; Rebs: B. Zudaire, 7 Asts: B. Zudaire, 11

Carleton University

13 September 2026
14:45

Statistics

Canada	80–37	Brazil
Scoring by quarter: 19-4, 40-16, 58-24, 80-37
Pts: A. Young, 23; Rebs: A. Young, 6 Asts: A. Young, 9		Pts: G. Vieira, 8 Rebs: G. Vieira, 6 Asts: V. Almeida, 4

TD Place

13 September 2026
19:00

Statistics

Spain	44–41	China
Scoring by quarter: 14-6, 27-15, 30-27, 44-41
Pts: I. Lopez Chavez, 18; Rebs: I. Lopez Chavez, 13; Asts: I. Lopez Chavez, 4		Pts: X. Zhang, 18; Rebs: X. Zhang, 15; Asts: S. Lin, 5

Carleton University

13 September 2026
19:15

Statistics

Great Britain	75–39	Australia
Scoring by quarter: 22-4, 39-16, 61-28, 75-39
Pts: K. Morrow, 18; Rebs: S. Carrigill, 8 Asts: S. Carrigill, 7		Pts: L. Davoli, 14; Rebs: G. Munro Cook, 4 Asts: G. Munro Cook, 6

TD Place

15 September 2026
14:30

Statistics

Canada	92–91 ()	Great Britain
Scoring by quarter: 14-8, 34-30, 48-49, 70-70, Overtime: 79-79, 92-91
Pts: A. Young, 32; Rebs: K. Dandeneau, 16; Asts: K. Dandeneau, 12		Pts: R. Love, 23; Rebs: R. Love, 9 Asts: L. Williams, 9

Carleton University

15 September 2026
16:45

Statistics

China	61–28	Brazil
Scoring by quarter: 14-5, 37-14, 45-16, 61-28
Pts: Q. Qiu, 16; Rebs: R. Zhao, 7 Asts: S. Lin, 7		Pts: D. Eusebio, 8 Rebs: V. Almeida, 7 Asts: P. Klokler, 2

Carleton University

15 September 2026
19:00

Statistics

Australia	50–55	Spain
Scoring by quarter: 14-15, 27-25, 41-35, 50-55
Pts: L. Davoli, 15; Rebs: L. Davoli, 13; Asts: S. Matheson, 6		Pts: B. Zudaire, 15; Rebs: I. Lopez Chavez, 11; Asts: B. Zudaire, 8

Carleton University

=== Group B ===
Team	Pld	W	L	PF	PA	PD	Pts
United States	5	5	0	423	207	+216	10
Netherlands	5	4	1	410	187	+223	9
Germany	5	3	2	274	255	+19	8
Japan	5	2	3	234	289	-55	7
France	5	1	4	187	309	-122	6
Algeria	5	0	5	136	417	-281	5

9 September 2026
12:00

Statistics

Germany	59–54	Japan
Scoring by quarter: 14-18, 28-27, 46-36, 59-54
Pts: S. Erni, 19; Rebs: S. Erni, 11; Asts: L. Bergenthal, 8		Pts: C. Kitada, 26; Rebs: C. Kitada, 14; Asts: A. Yanagimoto, 4

Carleton University

9 September 2026
14:15

Statistics

Netherlands	93–17	Algeria
Scoring by quarter: 27-2, 53-9, 71-13, 93-17
Pts: M. Beijer, 26; Rebs: B. Kramer, 16; Asts: B. Kramer, 5		Pts: D. Khemgani, 10; Rebs: D. Khemgani, 12

Carleton University

9 September 2026
16:30

Statistics

France	27–94	United States
Scoring by quarter: 6-29, 15-49, 25-67, 27-94
Pts: L. Nolet, 12; Rebs: G. Wembolua, 5 Asts: L. Nolet, 3		Pts: R. Hollermann, 27; Rebs: B. Murray, 9 Asts: R. Hollermann, 6

Carleton University

10 September 2026
16:45

Statistics

United States	73–31	Germany
Scoring by quarter: 21-6, 34-10, 56-20, 73-31
Pts: R. Hollermann, 15; Rebs: R. Hollermann, 14; Asts: I. Gonzalez, 7		Pts: L. Bergenthal, 10; Rebs: R. Neubauer, 6 Asts: L. Bergenthal, 3

Carleton University

10 September 2026
17:00

Statistics

Japan	16–84	Netherlands
Scoring by quarter: 4-22, 5-45, 7-68, 16-84
Pts: C. Kitada, 4 Rebs: M. Amimoto, 7		Pts: M. Beijer, 26; Rebs: B. Kramer, 23; Asts: C. Korver, 8

TD Place

10 September 2026
19:00

Statistics

Algeria	32–67	France
Scoring by quarter: 17-18, 22-32, 28-49, 32-67
Pts: K. Zairi, 16; Rebs: W. Ihamouchen, 13; Asts: D. Khemgani, 4		Pts: G. Wembolua, 27; Rebs: G. Wembolua, 10; Asts: G. Wembolua, 5

Carleton University

12 September 2026
10:00

Statistics

France	44–46	Japan
Scoring by quarter: 14-9, 21-17, 32-28, 44-46
Pts: G. Wembolua, 13; Rebs: G. Wembolua, 11; Asts: L. Nolet, 5		Pts: C. Kitada, 32; Rebs: M. Amimoto, 8 Asts: M. Hagino, 4

Carleton University

12 September 2026
10:15

Statistics

Algeria	29–102	United States
Scoring by quarter: 8-30, 12-53, 20-78, 29-102
Rebs: D. Khemgani, 6 Asts: D. Khemgani, 4		Pts: A. Middleton, 21; Rebs: Z. Voris, 5 Asts: L. Zurbrugg, 11

TD Place

12 September 2026
12:30

Statistics

Netherlands	73–50	Germany
Scoring by quarter: 22-16, 43-22, 64-32, 73-50
Pts: B. Kramer, 19; Rebs: B. Kramer, 10; Asts: C. De Rooij, 7		Pts: S. Mayer, 22; Rebs: R. Neubauer, 6 Asts: S. Mayer, 4

TD Place

13 September 2026
12:15

Statistics

Germany	50–26	France
Scoring by quarter: 12-2, 31-14, 44-20, 50-26
Pts: L. Bergenthal, 18; Rebs: R. Neubauer, 10; Asts: L. Bergenthal, 7		Pts: G. Wembolua, 12; Rebs: M. Blais, 10; Asts: G. Wembolua, 2

Carleton University

13 September 2026
12:30

Statistics

United States	81–73 ()	Netherlands
Scoring by quarter: 13-16, 35-33, 49-55, 69-69, Overtime: 81-73
Pts: R. Hollermann, 24; Rebs: R. Hollermann, 16; Asts: R. Hollermann, 8		Pts: M. Beijer, 26; Rebs: B. Kramer, 18; Asts: C. De Rooij, 11

TD Place

13 September 2026
14:30

Statistics

Japan	71–29	Algeria
Scoring by quarter: 17-6, 32-15, 57-19, 71-29
Pts: C. Kitada, 21; Rebs: C. Kitada, 9 Asts: C. Kitada, 6		Pts: K. Zairi, 15; Rebs: D. Khemgani, 6

Carleton University

14 September 2026
10:00

Statistics

United States	73–47	Japan
Scoring by quarter: 24-14, 43-20, 60-34, 73-47
Pts: R. Hollermann, 16; Rebs: E. Oberst, 6 Asts: L. Zurbrugg, 6		Pts: C. Kitada, 24; Rebs: M. Amimoto, 6 Asts: M. Amimoto, 5

Carleton University

14 September 2026
10:15

Statistics

France	23–87	Netherlands
Scoring by quarter: 10-24, 12-42, 19-68, 23-87
Pts: L. Nolet, 8 Rebs: M. Veuille, 6		Pts: B. Kramer, 26; Rebs: X. Wimmenhoeve, 19; Asts: C. Korver, 8

TD Place

15 September 2026
10:00

Statistics

Algeria	29–84	Germany
Scoring by quarter: 13-23, 19-44, 27-60, 29-84
Pts: K. Zairi, 13; Rebs: K. Zairi, 12; Asts: D. Khemgani, 6		Pts: R. Neubauer, 23; Rebs: R. Neubauer, 9 Asts: A. Sonnleitner, 6

Carleton University

=== Placement ===
==== 9-12 Placement matches ====
9-12 Placement matches
12:15 16 September 2026
Brazil	87
Algeria	28
10:15 16 September 2026
France	38
Australia	54

9th Place
17:00 17 September 2026
Brazil	59
Australia	52
11th Place
16:45 17 September 2026
France	79
Algeria	42

16 September 2026
10:15

Statistics

France	38–54	Australia
Scoring by quarter: 12-14, 28-30, 32-44, 38-54
Pts: G. Wembolua, 12; Rebs: G. Wembolua, 7 Asts: G. Wembolua, 6		Pts: L. Davoli, 15; Rebs: G. Munro Cook, 9 Asts: G. Munro Cook, 9

TD Place

16 September 2026
12:15

Statistics

Brazil	87–28	Algeria
Scoring by quarter: 22-6, 46-16, 63-24, 87-28
Pts: G. Vieira, 23; Rebs: P. Klokler, 11; Asts: D. Eusebio, 13		Pts: K. Zairi, 7 Rebs: D. Khemgani, 5 Asts: D. Khemgani, 7

Carleton University

17 September 2026
16:45

Statistics

France	79–42	Algeria
Scoring by quarter: 23-8, 42-21, 63-34, 79-42
Pts: M. Blais, 26; Rebs: M. Blais, 14; Asts: G. Wembolua, 6		Pts: K. Zairi, 21; Rebs: D. Khemgani, 12; Asts: D. Khemgani, 5

Carleton University

17 September 2026
19:00

Statistics

Brazil	59–52	Australia
Scoring by quarter: 14-15, 32-34, 46-48, 59-52
Pts: V. Almeida, 13; Rebs: P. Klokler, 9 Asts: P. Klokler, 5		Pts: G. Munro Cook, 16; Rebs: G. Munro Cook, 10; Asts: S. Matheson, 7

Carleton University

==== 5-8 Placement matches ====
5-8 Placement matches
12:15 17 September 2026
Germany	37
China	64
14:30 17 September 2026
Spain	67
Japan	46

5th Place
19:15 18 September 2026
Spain	44
China	67
7th Place
17:00 18 September 2026
Germany	50
Japan	33

17 September 2026
12:15

Statistics

Germany	37–64	China
Scoring by quarter: 12-15, 18-38, 33-48, 37-64
Pts: L. Bergenthal, 17; Rebs: L. Bergenthal, 5 Asts: L. Bergenthal, 3		Pts: X. Zhang, 33; Rebs: X. Zhang, 12; Asts: S. Lin, 12

Carleton University

17 September 2026
14:30

Statistics

Spain	67–46	Japan
Scoring by quarter: 22-10, 42-24, 56-37, 67-46
Pts: M. Alonso Vilariño, 17; Rebs: M. Alonso Vilariño, 12; Asts: B. Zudaire, 15		Pts: C. Kitada, 21; Rebs: C. Kitada, 4 Asts: M. Amimoto, 7

Carleton University

18 September 2026
17:00

Statistics

Germany	50–33	Japan
Scoring by quarter: 16-11, 28-11, 40-19, 50-33
Pts: R. Neubauer, 16; Rebs: R. Neubauer, 12; Asts: L. Bergenthal, 4		Pts: C. Kitada, 13; Rebs: C. Kitada, 9 Asts: M. Amimoto, 4

Carleton University

18 September 2026
19:15

Statistics

Spain	44–67	China
Scoring by quarter: 6-20, 16-40, 27-56, 44-67
Pts: B. Zudaire, 17; Rebs: I. Lopez Chavez, 5 Asts: B. Zudaire, 8		Pts: M. Zhang, 22; Rebs: X. Zhang, 7 Asts: S. Lin, 8

Carleton University

=== Finals ===
Quarter-finals
17:00 16 September 2026
United States	71
China	47
12:30 16 September 2026
Great Britain	81
Germany	38
14:45 16 September 2026
Canada	88
Japan	68
19:15 16 September 2026
Netherlands	75
Spain	38

Semi-finals
14:45 17 September 2026
United States	71
Great Britain	61
19:15 17 September 2026
Canada	85
Netherlands	73

Final
14:30 19 September 2026
United States	77
Canada	76
Bronze medal
12:15 19 September 2026
Great Britain	50
Netherlands	63

==== Quarter Finals ====
16 September 2026
12:30

Statistics

Great Britain	81–38	Germany
Scoring by quarter: 22-10, 35-20, 59-32, 81-38
Pts: J. Atkin, 23; Rebs: R. Love, 10; Asts: R. Love, 8		Pts: S. Mayer, 12; Rebs: R. Neubauer, 8

TD Place

16 September 2026
14:45

Statistics

Canada	88–68	Japan
Scoring by quarter: 26-12, 39-26, 66-54, 88-68
Pts: K. Dandeneau, 49; Rebs: K. Dandeneau, 12; Asts: A. Young, 11		Pts: C. Kitada, 25; Rebs: C. Kitada, 10; Asts: M. Amimoto, 5

TD Place

16 September 2026
17:00

Statistics

United States	71–47	China
Scoring by quarter: 21-12, 36-25, 53-39, 71-47
Pts: L. Zurbrugg, 16; Rebs: R. Hollermann, 14; Asts: L. Zurbrugg, 9		Pts: P. Zuo, 17; Rebs: S. Lin, 11; Asts: S. Lin, 11

TD Place

16 September 2026
19:15

Statistics

Netherlands	75–38	Spain
Scoring by quarter: 15-9, 36-17, 58-28, 75-38
Pts: M. Beijer, 21; Rebs: B. Kramer, 15; Asts: B. Kramer, 7		Pts: B. Zudaire, 15; Rebs: I. Lopez Chavez, 8 Asts: B. Zudaire, 3

TD Place

==== Semi Finals ====
17 September 2026
14:45

Statistics

United States	71–61	Great Britain
Scoring by quarter: 17-16, 27-37, 47-51, 71-61
Pts: C. Ryan, 20; Rebs: R. Hollermann, 11; Asts: C. Ryan, 7		Pts: K. Morrow, 23; Rebs: L. Williams, 8 Asts: R. Love, 9

TD Place

17 September 2026
19:15

Statistics

Canada	85–73	Netherlands
Scoring by quarter: 30-18, 42-40, 62-60, 85-73
Pts: K. Dandeneau, 35; Rebs: A. Young, 12; Asts: A. Young, 13		Pts: B. Kramer, 25; Rebs: B. Kramer, 9 Asts: B. Kramer, 12

TD Place

==== Bronze medal ====
19 September 2026
12:15

Statistics

Great Britain	50–63	Netherlands
Scoring by quarter: 21-17, 36-32, 44-44, 63-50
Pts: R. Love, 15; Rebs: R. Love, 11; Asts: R. Love, 6		Pts: B. Kramer, 26; Rebs: B. Kramer, 13; Asts: B. Kramer, 6

TD Place

==== Final ====
19 September 2026
14:30

Statistics

United States	77–76	Canada
Scoring by quarter: 27-20, 41-38, 60-59, 76-77
Pts: L. Zurbrugg, 26; Rebs: C. Ryan, 8 Asts: C. Ryan, 9		Pts: K. Dandeneau, 34; Rebs: K. Dandeneau, 13; Asts: A. Young, 12

TD Place

=== Final standings ===
Rank	Team
1	United States
2	Canada
3	Netherlands
4	Great Britain
5	China
6	Spain
7	Germany
8	Japan
9	Brazil
10	Australia
11	France
12	Algeria

== Men ==
=== Group A ===
Team	Pld	W	L	PF	PA	PD	Pts
Italy	3	3	0	206	147	+59	6
United States	3	2	1	176	168	+8	5
Netherlands	3	1	2	174	171	+3	4
Brazil	3	0	3	119	189	-70	3

10 September 2026
10:00

Statistics

Italy	77–32	Brazil
Scoring by quarter: 27-10, 48-20, 65-24, 77-32
Pts: A. Giaretti, 18; Rebs: A. Giaretti, 8 Asts: F. Carossino, 8		Pts: C. Clemente, 8 Rebs: C. Clemente, 7 Asts: C. Clemente, 3

Carleton University

10 September 2026
10:15

Statistics

United States	63–60	Netherlands
Scoring by quarter: 12-21, 26-31, 43-46, 63-60
Pts: J. Salazar, 18; Rebs: B. Bell, 8 Asts: J. Williams, 8		Pts: B. Van Hunnik, 21; Rebs: R. Poggenwisch, 13; Asts: A. Twigt, 7

TD Place

11 September 2026
16:45

Statistics

Netherlands	56–63	Italy
Scoring by quarter: 14-21, 31-37, 45-49, 56-63
Pts: B. Van Hunnik, 19; Rebs: R. Poggenwisch, 12; Asts: R. Poggenwisch, 8		Pts: F. Carossino, 22; Rebs: A. Sbuelz, 10; Asts: A. Giaretti, 5

Carleton University

11 September 2026
17:00

Statistics

Brazil	42–54	United States
Scoring by quarter: 12-9, 20-28, 29-41, 42-54
Pts: C. Clemente, 16; Rebs: C. Clemente, 11; Asts: C. Clemente, 3		Pts: J. Williams, 18; Rebs: J. Sanchez, 8 Asts: J. Williams, 8

TD Place

13 September 2026
16:45

Statistics

Brazil	45–58	Netherlands
Scoring by quarter: 14-12, 26-32, 34-49, 45-58
Pts: C. Clemente, 21; Rebs: C. Clemente, 8 Asts: C. Clemente, 3		Pts: A. Twigt, 24; Rebs: R. Poggenwisch, 16; Asts: R. Poggenwisch, 11

Carleton University

13 September 2026
17:00

Statistics

United States	59–66	Italy
Scoring by quarter: 18-13, 25-32, 44-48, 59-66
Pts: J. Salazar, 19; Rebs: J. Williams, 7 Asts: B. Bell, 8		Pts: G. Papi, 19; Rebs: A. Giaretti, 10; Asts: G. Papi, 6

TD Place

=== Group B ===
Team	Pld	W	L	PF	PA	PD	Pts
Australia	3	3	0	267	172	+95	6
Great Britain	3	2	1	216	183	+33	5
Turkey	3	1	2	224	232	-8	4
Argentina	3	0	3	147	267	-120	3

10 September 2026
12:15

Statistics

Australia	100–46	Argentina
Scoring by quarter: 32-6, 53-24, 80-32, 100-46
Pts: J. Brown, 34; Rebs: J. Brown, 9 Asts: T. O'Neill-Thorne, 8		Pts: J. Gabas, 15; Rebs: D. Copa, 4 Asts: J. Gabas, 3

Carleton University

10 September 2026
12:30

Statistics

Great Britain	77–70	Turkey
Scoring by quarter: 18-16, 37-30, 58-47, 77-70
Pts: B. Fox, 28; Rebs: O. Knight, 8 Asts: P. Pratt, 15		Pts: U. Toprak, 18; Rebs: M. Günaydin, 6 Asts: F. Gümüş, 6

TD Place

11 September 2026
19:00

Statistics

Turkey	67–90	Australia
Scoring by quarter: 21-13, 32-33, 47-69, 67-90
Pts: U. Toprak, 20; Rebs: B. Oguz, 7 Asts: B. Yilmaz, 5		Pts: J. Brown, 27; Rebs: J. Brown, 10; Asts: T. O'Neill-thorne, 8

Carleton University

11 September 2026
19:15

Statistics

Argentina	36–80	Great Britain
Scoring by quarter: 12-16, 18-38, 24-64, 36-80
Pts: J. Gabas, 8 Rebs: L. Muller, 6 Asts: M. Ruggeri, 5		Pts: B. Fox, 20; Rebs: B. Fox, 7 Asts: P. Pratt, 19

TD Place

13 September 2026
10:00

Statistics

Turkey	87–65	Argentina
Scoring by quarter: 25-10, 49-22, 69-40, 87-65
Pts: B. Yilmaz, 17; Rebs: Y. Yuksel, 7 Asts: U. Toprak, 8		Pts: L. Muller, 15; Rebs: A. Pérez, 6 Asts: M. Ruggeri, 9

Carleton University

13 September 2026
10:15

Statistics

Great Britain	59–77	Australia
Scoring by quarter: 12-25, 33-40, 53-60, 59-77
Pts: T. O'Neill-Thorne, 25; Rebs: J. Brown, 11; Asts: T. O'Neill-Thorne, 10		Pts: B. Fox, 15; Rebs: O. Knight, 11; Asts: P. Pratt, 13

TD Place

=== Group C ===
Team	Pld	W	L	PF	PA	PD	Pts
Japan	3	3	0	206	170	+36	6
Spain	3	1	2	222	200	+22	4
Poland	3	1	2	214	229	-15	4
Colombia	3	1	2	180	223	-43	4

9 September 2026
09:30

Statistics

Spain	83–54	Colombia
Scoring by quarter: 19-7, 41-20, 55-39, 83-54
Pts: M. Diaz Lorenzo, 22; Rebs: E. Prieto Barragan, 10; Asts: Ó. Onrubia Gonzales, 9		Pts: J. Hernandez, 20; Rebs: R. Perez, 4 Asts: J. Hernandez, 5

TD Place

9 September 2026
11:45

Statistics

Japan	71–63	Poland
Scoring by quarter: 8-20, 28-36, 47-54, 71-63
Pts: D. Mosler, 18; Rebs: D. Mosler, 11; Asts: R. Chokai, 11		Pts: H. Kozai, 29; Rebs: R. Chokai, 15; Asts: M. Filipski, 12

TD Place

11 September 2026
14:30

Statistics

Colombia	53–75	Japan
Scoring by quarter: 12-22, 27-41, 43-57, 53-75
Pts: L. Angulo, 17; Rebs: J. Hernandez, 9 Asts: J. Hernandez, 8		Pts: K. Akita, 18; Rebs: R. Chokai, 9 Asts: R. Chokai, 11

Carleton University

11 September 2026
14:45

Statistics

Poland	86–85	Spain
Scoring by quarter: 28-29, 45-51, 63-73, 86-85
Pts: M. Filipski, 32; Rebs: D. Mosler, 7 Asts: M. Filipski, 8		Pts: I. Ortega Lafuente, 29; Rebs: J. Vilas Fernandez, 6 Asts: Ó. Onrubia Gonzales, 7

TD Place

12 September 2026
17:15

Statistics

Spain	54–60	Japan
Scoring by quarter: 13-17, 24-30, 43-43, 54-60
Pts: M. Diaz Lorenzo, 18; Rebs: E. Prieto Barragan, 8 Asts: Ó. Onrubia Gonzales, 8		Pts: R. Chokai, 21; Rebs: Y. Takamatsu, 11; Asts: R. Chokai, 11

TD Place

12 September 2026
19:00

Statistics

Poland	65–73	Colombia
Scoring by quarter: 16-11, 37-39, 52-50, 65-73
Pts: D. Mosler, 20; Rebs: M. Filipski, 10; Asts: M. Filipski, 5		Pts: J. Hernandez, 19; Rebs: J. Granados, 10; Asts: J. Hernandez, 9

Carleton University

=== Group D ===
Team	Pld	W	L	PF	PA	PD	Pts
Germany	3	3	0	200	101	+99	6
Canada	3	2	1	167	140	+27	5
Morocco	3	1	2	99	165	-66	4
Iran	3	0	0	0	60	-60	0

9 September 2026
19:30

Statistics

Morocco	51–74	Canada
Scoring by quarter: 11-17, 32-34, 36-55, 51-74
Pts: Z. Challat, 16; Rebs: R. Maataoui, 8 Asts: Z. Challat, 6		Pts: N. Goncin, 24; Rebs: C. Higgins, 12; Asts: C. Higgins, 9

TD Place

11 September 2026
12:00

Statistics

Canada	73–89	Germany
Scoring by quarter: 26-30, 39-50, 53-76, 73-89
Pts: N. Goncin, 25; Rebs: C. Higgins, 8 Asts: C. Higgins, 5		Pts: A. Halouski, 27; Rebs: A. Budde, 7 Asts: N. DreimÜller, 13

TD Place

12 September 2026
12:15

Statistics

Morocco	28–91	Germany
Scoring by quarter: 12-24, 16-42, 26-66, 28-91
Pts: R. Maataoui, 10; Rebs: A. Falempe, 7 Asts: Z. Challat, 4		Pts: T. Böhme, 16; Rebs: A. Halouski, 9 Asts: N. Dreimüller, 7

Carleton University

=== Placement ===
==== 9-16 Placement ====
15 September 2026
10:15

Statistics

Brazil	79–47	Morocco
Scoring by quarter: 18-13, 30-25, 52-39, 79-47
Pts: C. Clemente, 31; Rebs: C. Clemente, 14; Asts: C. Clemente, 9		Pts: R. Maataoui, 15; Rebs: R. Maataoui, 7 Asts: Z. Challat, 7

TD Place

15 September 2026
12:15

Statistics

Canada	67–78	Argentina
Scoring by quarter: 18-10, 39-36, 58-57, 67-78
Pts: N. Goncin, 23; Rebs: N. Goncin, 13; Asts: C. Higgins, 10		Pts: C. Esteche, 29; Rebs: A. Pérez, 8 Asts: M. Ruggeri, 10

Carleton University

16 September 2026
14:30

Statistics

Turkey	79–90	Colombia
Scoring by quarter: 20-26, 40-52, 65-72, 79-90
Pts: M. Muhi̇tti̇noğlu, 17; Rebs: B. Oguz, 6 Asts: M. Günaydin, 8		Pts: L. Angulo, 26; Rebs: J. Hernandez, 9 Asts: J. Hernandez, 15

Carleton University

17 September 2026
10:00

Statistics

Colombia	64–56	Brazil
Scoring by quarter: 20-22, 33-28, 49-42, 64-56
Pts: J. Hernandez, 19; Rebs: J. Hernandez, 8 Asts: J. Hernandez, 12		Pts: C. Clemente, 24; Rebs: C. Clemente, 5 Asts: S. Junior, 3

Carleton University

17 September 2026
10:15

Statistics

Netherlands	65–46	Argentina
Scoring by quarter: 18-7, 32-15, 45-34, 65-46
Pts: B. Van Hunnik, 14; Rebs: R. Poggenwisch, 15; Asts: R. Poggenwisch, 13		Pts: D. Copa, 15; Rebs: J. Gabas, 7 Asts: C. Esteche, 5

TD Place

18 September 2026
14:30

Statistics

Netherlands	66–59	Colombia
Scoring by quarter: 19-14, 33-31, 47-49, 66-59
Pts: A. Twigt, 18; Rebs: R. Poggenwisch, 6 Asts: A. Twigt, 8		Pts: J. Hernandez, 24; Rebs: J. Escobar, 12; Asts: J. Hernandez, 9

TD Place

18 September 2026
14:45

Statistics

Argentina	61–49	Brazil
Scoring by quarter: 20-13, 42-23, 56-38, 61-49
Pts: J. Gabas, 20; Rebs: A. Pérez, 11; Asts: C. Esteche, 7		Pts: S. Junior, 14; Rebs: C. Clemente, 8 Asts: C. Clemente, 7

Carleton University

==== 5-8 Placement ====
5-8 Placement matches
19:00 16 September 2026
Japan	53
Poland	47
16:45 16 September 2026
United States	65
Spain	55

5th Place
19:00 18 September 2026
Japan	67
United States	72
7th Place
16:45 18 September 2026
Spain	80
Poland	55

16 September 2026
16:45

Statistics

United States	65–55	Spain
Scoring by quarter: 23-15, 38-22, 51-39, 65-55
Pts: J. Williams, 25; Rebs: J. Williams, 9 Asts: J. Williams, 6		Pts: I. Ortega Lafuente, 20; Rebs: I. Ortega Lafuente, 14; Asts: Ó. Onrubia Gonzales, 8

Carleton University

16 September 2026
19:00

Statistics

Japan	53–47	Poland
Scoring by quarter: 15-13, 29-25, 43-35, 53-47
Pts: H. Kozai, 18; Rebs: R. Chokai, 13; Asts: R. Chokai, 9		Pts: D. Mosler, 16; Rebs: M. WesoŁowski, 11; Asts: M. Filipski, 3

Carleton University

18 September 2026
16:45

Statistics

Spain	80–55	Poland
Scoring by quarter: 22-17, 40-28, 66-43, 80-55
Pts: I. Ortega Lafuente, 14; Rebs: M. Diaz Lorenzo, 5 Asts: I. Ortega Lafuente, 9		Pts: K. Bandura, 20; Rebs: D. Mosler, 5 Asts: M. Wesołowski, 5

TD Place

18 September 2026
19:00

Statistics

Japan	67–72	United States
Scoring by quarter: 20-11, 32-25, 46-54, 67-72
Pts: R. Chokai, 29; Rebs: R. Chokai, 8 Asts: R. Chokai, 12		Pts: J. Williams, 21; Rebs: J. Salazar, 8 Asts: J. Williams, 13

TD Place

=== Finals ===
Knockout Stage
14:30 14 September 2026
Australia	69
Brazil	44
12:15 14 September 2026
Spain	90
Morocco	44
12:30 14 September 2026
Germany	77
Colombia	63
17:00 14 September 2026
United States	71
Turkey	44
16:45 14 September 2026
Italy	71
Argentina	44
14:45 14 September 2026
Canada	65
Poland	79
19:45 14 September 2026
Japan	20
Iran	0
19:00 14 September 2026
Great Britain	69
Netherlands	47

Quarter-finals
12:30 15 September 2026
Australia	70
Spain	66
17:00 15 September 2026
Germany	67
United States	64
14:45 15 September 2026
Italy	75
Poland	68
19:15 15 September 2026
Japan	66
Great Britain	68

Semi-finals
12:30 17 September 2026
Australia	84
Germany	83
17:00 17 September 2026
Italy	63
Great Britain	59

Final
16:45 19 September 2026
Australia	81
Italy	57
Bronze medal
10:00 19 September 2026
Germany	56
Great Britain	67

==== Knockout stage ====
14 September 2026
12:15

Statistics

Spain	90–44	Morocco
Scoring by quarter: 28-8, 47-20, 69-34, 90-44
Pts: M. Diaz Lorenzo, 31; Rebs: F. García Quiles, 6 Asts: Ó. Onrubia Gonzales, 5		Pts: Z. Challat, 13; Rebs: R. Maataoui, 6 Asts: Z. Challat, 4

Carleton University

14 September 2026
12:30

Statistics

Germany	77–63	Colombia
Scoring by quarter: 15-15, 34-27, 52-44, 77-63
Pts: M. Güntner, 20; Rebs: J. Lammering, 11; Asts: T. Böhme, 12		Pts: J. Hernandez, 20; Rebs: L. Angulo, 9 Asts: J. Hernandez, 10

TD Place

14 September 2026
14:30

Statistics

Australia	69–44	Brazil
Scoring by quarter: 9-8, 33-23, 56-38, 69-44
Pts: J. Brown, 20; Rebs: J. Brown, 13; Asts: B. Latham, 6		Pts: C. Clemente, 20; Rebs: D. Filho, 9 Asts: C. Clemente, 4

Carleton University

14 September 2026
14:45

Statistics

Canada	65–79	Poland
Scoring by quarter: 17-11, 31-31, 45-56, 65-79
Pts: N. Goncin, 22; Rebs: C. Higgins, 10; Asts: C. Higgins, 8		Pts: M. Filipski, 26; Rebs: M. Filipski, 11; Asts: M. Filipski, 11

TD Place

14 September 2026
16:45

Statistics

Italy	71–44	Argentina
Scoring by quarter: 22-9, 35-21, 55-27, 71-44
Pts: F. Carossino, 19; Rebs: F. Carossino, 9 Asts: A. Giaretti, 8		Pts: J. Gabas, 10; Rebs: L. Muller, 6 Asts: M. Ruggeri, 4

Carleton University

14 September 2026
17:00

Statistics

United States	69–44	Turkey
Scoring by quarter: 22-10, 34-25, 46-37, 69-44
Pts: J. Salazar, 24; Rebs: J. Salazar, 8 Asts: B. Bell, 6		Pts: B. Oguz, 12; Rebs: B. Oguz, 8 Asts: U. Toprak, 7

TD Place

14 September 2026
19:00

Statistics

Great Britain	69–47	Netherlands
Scoring by quarter: 20-12, 32-26, 52-35, 69-47
Pts: L. Manning, 18; Rebs: P. Pratt, 14; Asts: G. Warburton, 10		Pts: Q. Zantinge, 14; Rebs: R. Poggenwisch, 10; Asts: R. Poggenwisch, 4

Carleton University

==== Quarter Finals ====
15 September 2026
12:30

Statistics

Australia	70–66	Spain
Scoring by quarter: 14-17, 31-32, 51-52, 70-66
Pts: J. Brown, 41; Rebs: J. Brown, 10; Asts: T. O'Neill-Thorne, 11		Pts: I. Ortega Lafuente, 20; Rebs: M. Diaz Lorenzo, 13; Asts: E. Prieto Barragan, 9

TD Place

15 September 2026
14:45

Statistics

Italy	75–68	Poland
Scoring by quarter: 20-12, 37-31, 57-52, 75-68
Pts: F. Carossino, 26; Rebs: F. Carossino, 9 Asts: F. Carossino, 8		Pts: M. WesoŁowski, 15; Rebs: M. Filipski, 8 Asts: M. Filipski, 7

TD Place

15 September 2026
17:00

Statistics

Germany	67–64	United States
Scoring by quarter: 13-14, 28-29, 44-43, 67-64
Pts: A. Halouski, 23; Rebs: A. Budde, 7 Asts: T. Böhme, 12		Pts: J. Salazar, 26; Rebs: J. Salazar, 10; Asts: B. Bell, 8

TD Place

15 September 2026
19:15

Statistics

Japan	66–68	Great Britain
Scoring by quarter: 14-12, 40-24, 56-47, 66-68
Pts: R. Chokai, 25; Rebs: Y. Takamatsu, 14; Asts: R. Chokai, 13		Pts: P. Pratt, 24; Rebs: P. Pratt, 8 Asts: P. Pratt, 8

TD Place

==== Semi Finals ====
17 September 2026
12:30

Statistics

Australia	84–83 ()	Germany
Scoring by quarter: 18-21, 34-44, 51-61, 76-76, Overtime: 84-83
Pts: J. Brown, 37; Rebs: J. Brown, 16; Asts: J. Brown, 8		Pts: A. Halouski, 26; Rebs: A. Budde, 7 Asts: T. Böhme, 8

TD Place

17 September 2026
17:00

Statistics

Italy	63–59	Great Britain
Scoring by quarter: 10-22, 25-36, 45-43, 63-59
Pts: F. Carossino, 23; Rebs: F. Carossino, 8 Asts: A. Giaretti, 7		Pts: B. Fox, 14; Rebs: L. Manning, 10; Asts: G. Warburton, 9

TD Place

==== Bronze medal ====
19 September 2026
10:00

Statistics

Germany	56–67	Great Britain
Scoring by quarter: 18–23, 11–22, 12–8, 15–14
Pts: N. Dreimüller, 24; Rebs: A. Halouski, 7 Asts: T. Böhme, 10		Pts: G. Warburton, 20; Rebs: L. Manning, 9 Asts: P. Pratt, 16

TD Place

==== Final ====
19 September 2026
16:45

Statistics

Australia	81–57	Italy
Scoring by quarter: 21–14, 26–17, 19–12, 15–14
Pts: J. Brown, 28; Rebs: T. O'Neill-Thorne, 7 Asts: T. O'Neill-Thorne, 16		Pts: F. Carossino, 16; Rebs: F. Carossino, 4 Asts: F. Carossino, 5

TD Place

=== Final standings ===
Rank	Team
1	Australia
2	Italy
3	Great Britain
4	Germany
5	United States
6	Japan
7	Spain
8	Poland
9	Netherlands
10	Colombia
11	Argentina
12	Brazil
13	Canada
14	Turkey
15	Morocco
16	Iran

== All Stars ==
=== Men ===
All Star Players

- (Australia) Frank Pinder — 1.0–1.5
- (United Kingdom) Gregg Warburton — 2.0–2.5
- (Italy) Filippo Carossino — 3.0–3.5
- (Germany) Aliaksandr Halouski — 4.0–4.5

Most Valuable Player

- (Australia) Jaylen Brown

=== Women ===
All Star Players

- (Netherlands) Jitske Visser — 1.0–1.5
- (United Kingdom) Joy Haizelden — 2.0–2.5
- (United States) Rose Hollermann — 3.0–3.5
- (Canada) Arinn Young — 4.0–4.5

Most Valuable Player

- (Canada) Kady Dandeneau
