= Joy Haizelden =

British wheelchair basketball player

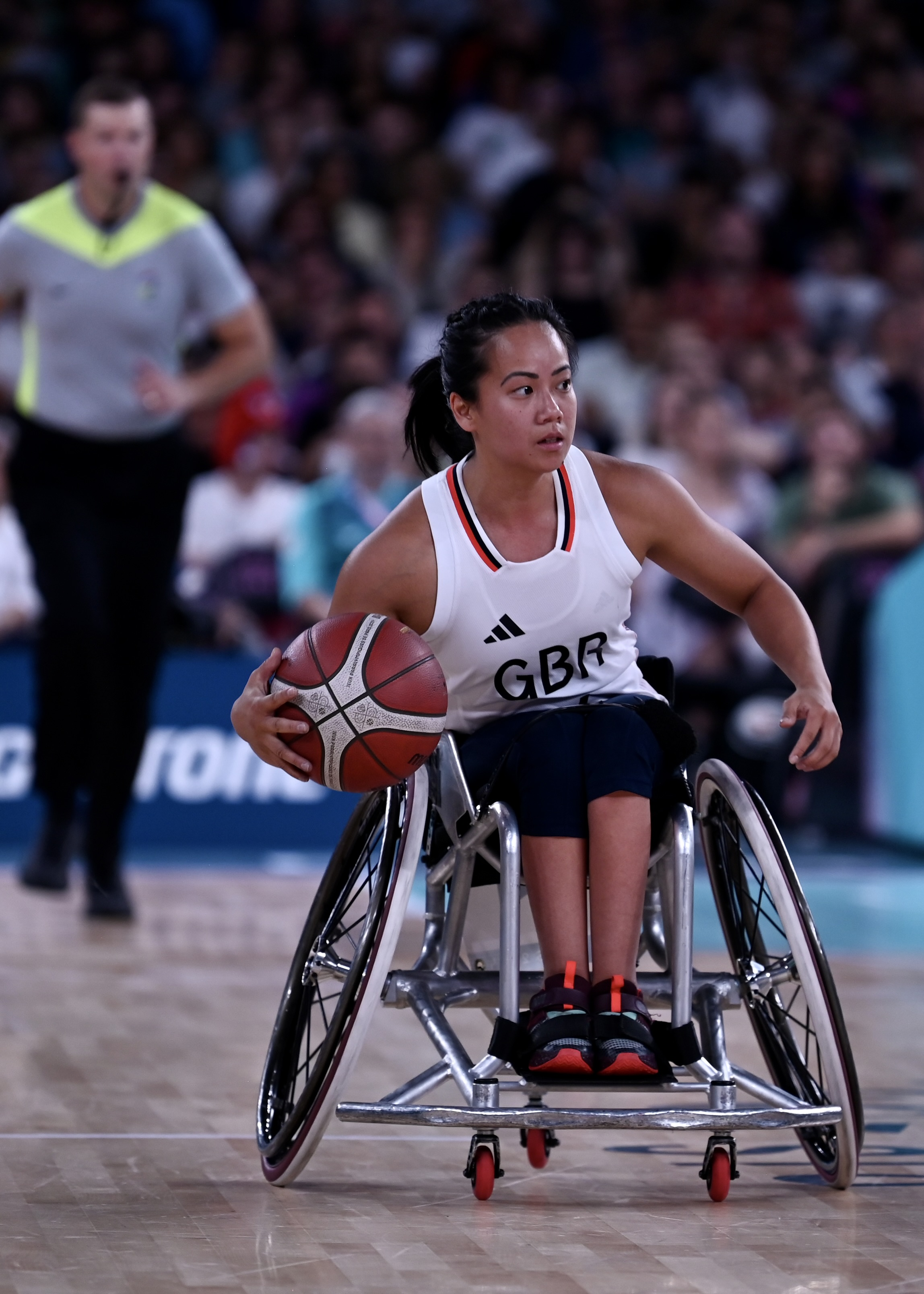
- Haizelden at the 2024 Paralympics

Personal information
- Nationality: United Kingdom
- Born: 1 December 1998 (age 27)

Sport
- Country: Great Britain
- Sport: Wheelchair basketball
- Disability class: 2.5
- University team: University of Alabama (2022 - present)
- Club: Coventry Wheelchair Basketball Academy
Medal record
Women's wheelchair basketball
Representing Great Britain
World Championships
Silver medal – second place	2018 Hamburg	Team
U25 World Championships
Gold medal – first place	2015 Beijin	Team
European Championships
Silver medal – second place	2019 Rotterdam	Team
Silver medal – second place	2021 Madrid	Team
Silver medal – second place	2023 Rotterdam	Team
Silver medal – second place	2025 Sarajevo	Team
Bronze medal – third place	2015 Worcester	Team
Bronze medal – third place	2017 Tenriffe	Team
Women's 3x3 wheelchair basketball
Representing England
Commonwealth Games
Gold medal – first place	2026 Glasgow	Team
Bronze medal – third place	2022 Birmingham	Team

Joy Haizelden (born 1 December 1998) is a 2.5 point British wheelchair basketball player who was the youngest player to represent Great Britain at the 2014 Women's World Wheelchair Basketball Championship in Toronto. She also went to Paris to compete at the 2024 Paralympics.

== Career ==
Joy Haizelden was born on 1 December 1998. Joy was abandoned outside an orphanage in China. She was adopted by a British couple, Jim and Margaret Haizelden, who took her to live in Southampton, in Hampshire, in 2005. She was a student at The Kings School. Joy could not participate in physical education, so Jim went looking for ways to keep her fit and active. A friend invited him to bring Joy to his wheelchair basketball club.

Haizelden is classified as a 2.5 point player. She made her international debut in the Standard Life Head to Head series against the Netherlands in 2013. This was followed by the U25 European Wheelchair Basketball Championships, where Team Great Britain won the silver medal. She was named the Peter Jackson Young Female Player of the Year at The Lord's Taverners National Junior Championships in July 2013, and was part of England South's team at the Sainsbury 2013 School Games, winning bronze.

At the age of 15, she was the youngest player chosen to represent Great Britain at the 2014 Women's World Wheelchair Basketball Championship in Toronto. Team Great Britain came fifth, its best ever result at the World Championship. The following year, she was part of Team Great Britain at the Osaka Cup in Japan in February, winning silver, and at the 2015 Women's U25 Wheelchair Basketball World Championship in Beijing in July, winning gold. The senior team then defeated France to take bronze in the 2015 European Championship in Worcester. In May 2016, she was named as part of the team for the 2016 Summer Paralympics in Rio de Janeiro. The British team produced its best ever performance at the Paralympics, making it all the way to the semi-finals, but lost to the semi-final to the United States, and then the bronze medal match to the Netherlands.

== Achievements ==
- 2014: Fifth at the World Wheelchair Basketball Championship (Toronto, Canada)
- 2015: Silver at the Osaka Cup (Osaka, Japan)
- 2015: Gold at the 2015 Women's U25 Wheelchair Basketball World Championship (Beijing, China)
- 2015: Bronze at the European Championships (Worcester, England)
- 2016: Fourth at the 2016 Paralympics (Rio de Janeiro, Brazil)
- 2017: Bronze at the European Championships (Tenerife, Spain)
- 2018: Silver at the 2018 Wheelchair Basketball World Championship (Hamburg, Germany)
- 2019: Silver at the 2019 European Championships (Rotterdam, The Netherlands)
- 2021: Silver at the 2021 European Championships (Madrid, Spain)
- 2023: Silver at the 2023 European Championships (Rotterdam, The Netherlands)

=== NWBA intercollegiate ===
- 5× Champion (2022, 2023, 2024, 2025, 2026)
- 1× Rookie Team All American (2022)
- 1× 2st team All American (2022)
- 1× 1st team All American (2023)
