= Meryem Tan =

Turkish wheelchair basketball player (born 1999)

Personal information
- Nationality: Turkish
- Born: 3 February 1999 (age 27) Pamukkale, Denizli, Turkey

Sport
- Sport: Women's Wheelchair Basketball
- Disability class: 4.0
- Club: Pamukkla Belediyespor
Medal record
Women's wheelchair basketball
Representing Turkey

Meryem Tan (born 3 February 1999) is a Turkish wheelchair basketball player. She was a member of the Turkey women's national wheelchair basketball team.

== Club career ==
Tan started playing wheelchair basketball encouraged by her high school physical education teacher. She entered the Pamukkale Belediyespor in 2015, which was established in August that year. Her team compete in the Turkish Women's Wheelchair Basketball Second League, after their promotion from the Regional League and then from the Third League.

She plays in the disability class 4.0.

== International career ==
Tan was admitted to the Turkey women's national wheelchair basketball team, and played at the 2016 IWBF European Championship Women's Division B in Italy.

She played for the Turkey women's natioanal under-25 wheelchair basketball team at the 2019 Women's U25 Wheelchair Basketball World Championship in Suphanburi, Thailand.

She played at the European Wheelchair Basketball Championship in 2019 in Rotterdam, Netherland, and 2021 in Madrid, Spain.

== Personal life ==
Meryem Tan was born on 3 February 1999. She is a native of Pamukkale, Denizli, Turkey. She is disabled on her two legs.

She completed her secondary education at IMKB Technical and Vocational High School for Girls.
