= Wheelchair basketball at the 1996 Summer Paralympics – Women's tournament =

Wheelchair basketball – Women at the X Paralympic Games
- Paralympic Wheelchair Basketball
- Venue: Morehouse College and Omni Coliseum
- Dates: 1996

Medalists
1st place, gold medalist(s)		Canada (CAN)
2nd place, silver medalist(s)		Netherlands (NED)
3rd place, bronze medalist(s)		United States (USA)

The women's tournament was won by the team representing Canada.

== Preliminary round ==
Group A
Rank	Team	Pld	W	L	PF:PA	Pts	AUS	USA	GER	BRA
1	Australia	3	2	1	132:71	5	x	31:27	34:36	67:8
2	United States	3	2	1	128:79	5	27:31	x	44:36	57:12
3	Germany	3	2	1	121:92	5	36:34	36:44	x	49:14
4	Brazil	3	0	3	34:173	3	8:67	12:57	14:49	x

Group B
Rank	Team	Pld	W	L	PF:PA	Pts	CAN	NED	JPN	GBR
1	Canada	3	3	0	171:96	6	x	56:41	57:27	58:28
2	Netherlands	3	2	1	143:115	5	41:56	x	54:35	48:24
3	Japan	3	1	2	108:142	4	27:57	35:54	x	46:31
4	Great Britain	3	0	3	83:152	3	28:58	24:48	31:46	x

Qualified for semifinals

Source: Paralympic.org

== Medal Round ==
Semifinals
United States	37
Netherlands	40
Canada	36
Australia	31

Final
Netherlands	37
Canada	46
Third place
United States	41
Australia	30

Source: Paralympic.org

== Classification 5-8 ==
Classification round
Germany	41
Great Britain	46
Japan	41
Brazil	15

Fifth place
Great Britain	28
Japan	44
Seventh place
Germany	60
Brazil	15

Source: Paralympic.org

== Ranking ==
Place	Team
1st place, gold medalist(s)	Canada
2nd place, silver medalist(s)	Netherlands
3rd place, bronze medalist(s)	United States
4.	Australia
5.	Japan
6.	Great Britain
7.	Germany
8.	Brazil
