= Wheelchair basketball at the 2004 Summer Paralympics – Women's tournament =

Wheelchair basketball – Women at the XII Paralympic Games
- Paralympic Wheelchair Basketball
- Venue: Olympic Indoor Hall
- Dates: 18–28 September 2004
- Competitors: 96 from 8 nations

Medalists
| 1st place, gold medalist(s) | | United States (USA) |
| 2nd place, silver medalist(s) | | Australia (AUS) |
| 3rd place, bronze medalist(s) | | Canada (CAN) |

The women's tournament was won by the team representing United States.

== Preliminary round ==
Group A
| Rank | Team | Pld | W | L | PF:PA | Pts | AUS | USA | GBR | NED |
|---|---|---|---|---|---|---|---|---|---|---|
| 1 | Australia | 3 | 3 | 0 | 155:107 | 6 | x | 62:61 | 63:21 | 30:25 |
| 2 | United States | 3 | 2 | 1 | 192:124 | 5 | 61:62 | x | 74:24 | 57:38 |
| 3 | Great Britain | 3 | 1 | 2 | 81:167 | 4 | 21:63 | 24:74 | x | 36:30 |
| 4 | Netherlands | 3 | 0 | 3 | 93:123 | 3 | 25:30 | 38:57 | 30:36 | x |

Group B
| Rank | Team | Pld | W | L | PF:PA | Pts | CAN | GER | JPN | MEX |
|---|---|---|---|---|---|---|---|---|---|---|
| 1 | Canada | 3 | 3 | 0 | 173:108 | 6 | x | 59:46 | 51:28 | 63:34 |
| 2 | Germany | 3 | 2 | 1 | 153:133 | 5 | 46:59 | x | 50:36 | 57:38 |
| 3 | Japan | 3 | 1 | 2 | 109:130 | 4 | 28:51 | 36:50 | x | 45:29 |
| 4 | Mexico | 3 | 0 | 3 | 101:165 | 3 | 34:63 | 38:57 | 29:45 | x |

Source: Paralympic.org

== Medal round ==
Quarterfinals
United States | 70
Japan | 33
Canada | 65
Netherlands | 46
Germany | 63
Great Britain | 24
Australia | 50
Mexico | 46

Semifinals
United States | 57
Canada | 40
Germany | 50
Australia | 58

Finals
United States | 56
Australia | 44
Third place
Canada | 63
Germany | 47

Source: Paralympic.org

== Classification 5-8 ==
Semi-finals
Japan | 54
Netherlands | 52
Great Britain | 29
Mexico | 40

Fifth place
Japan | 53
Mexico | 47
Third place
Netherlands | 48
Great Britain | 30

Source: Paralympic.org

== Ranking ==
| Place | Team |
|---|---|
| 1st place, gold medalist(s) | United States |
| 2nd place, silver medalist(s) | Australia |
| 3rd place, bronze medalist(s) | Canada |
| 4. | Germany |
| 5. | Japan |
| 6. | Mexico |
| 7. | Netherlands |
| 8. | Great Britain |
