= Serra Uzun =

Turkish wheelchair basketball player (born 2002)

Personal information
- Nationality: Turkish
- Born: 6 March 2002 (age 24) Yalova, Turkey

Sport
- Sport: Women's Wheelchair Basketball
- Disability class: 2.5
- Club: Yalova Ortopedikler SK
Medal record
Women's wheelchair basketball
Representing Turkey

Serra Uzun (born 6 March 2002) is a Turkish wheelchair basketball player. She plays for Yalova Ortopedikler SK in the Turkish Women's Wheelchair Basketball Super League. She is part of the Turkey women's national wheelchair basketball team.

== Club career ==
Uzun started performing para archery in the beginning. She then switched over to playing wheelchair basketball at age 12 in her current club Yalova Ortopedikler SK.

She competes at the Turkish Women's Wheelchair Basketball Super League.

In 2015, she placed third with her team at the European Challenge Cup in the Netherlands.

Uzun plays with disability class 2.5.

== International career ==
At the age of 13, Uzun was selected to the newly established Turkey women's national under-25 wheelchair basketball team as the youngest member. Uzun debuted internationally playing for the Turkey women's U25 team at the 2019 Women's U25 Wheelchair Basketball World Championship in Suphanburi, Thailand.

In July 2023, she took part at the preparation camps of the Turkey women's national wheelchair basketball team in Hakkari, Turkey and Tabriz, Iran. She played at the 2023 IWBF Women's European Championship in Rotterdam, Netherlands.

== Personal life ==
Serra Uzun was born with congenital disorder in Yalova, Turkey on 6 March 2002.
