= Zümeyran Tekçe =

Turkish wheelchair basketball player (born 1996)

Personal information
- Nationality: Turkish
- Born: 16 January 1996 (age 30) Hakkari, Turkey

Sport
- Sport: Women's Wheelchair Basketball
- Disability class: 4.0
- Club: Lotus ESK
Medal record
Women's wheelchair basketball
Representing Turkey

Zümeyran Tekçe (born 16 January 1996), also known as Zümeyran Polat, is a Turkish wheelchair basketball player. She plays for Lotus ESK in Ankara. She is part of the Turkey women's national wheelchair basketball team.

== Club career ==
She started playing wheelchair basketball with the encouragement of her parents.

In 2015, she won the first prize of the women's category, along with two teammates from the national team, Mine Ercan and Maşide Cesur, at the traditional "Wheelchair Streetball" tournament organized by the Bayrampaşa Municipality in Istanbul.

She played for Sümbül Disabled Sports Club in her hometown Hakkari. In 2021, she transferred to Yenimahalle, Ankara-based club Lotus Disabled SC, and played at the second edition of the Turkish Women's Wheelchair Basketball Championship held in Hatay.

== International career ==
She was selected to the candidate squad of the Turkey women's national wheelchair basketball team in June 2015.

Early 2016, she took part at the preparation camp of the Turkey women's national under-25 wheelchair basketball team held in Yalova, Turkey. She was selected to the women's U25 team.

Polat took part at the European Wheelchair Basketball Championship in 2015 in Worcester, England, and in 2017 in Tenerife, Spain. She was called up to the national team preparation camp in Aksaray, Turkey from May to June 2023. She played at the 2023 IWBF Women's European Championship in Rotterdam, Netherlands.

== Personal life ==
Zümeyran Tekçe, later rook the surname Polat, was born with a congenital disorder in Hakkari, eastern Turkey on 16 January 1996.
