= Begüm Pusat =

Turkish wheelchair basketball player (born 2004)

Personal information
- Born: 2004 (age 21–22) Turkey

Sport
- Sport: Women's Wheelchair Basketball
- Position: Forward
- Disability class: 2.5
- Club: Beşiktaş JK wheelchair basketball
Medal record
Women's wheelchair basketball
Representing Turkey

Begüm Pusat (born 2004) is a Turkish wheelchair basketball player who plays for Beşiktaş JK and is a member of the Turkey women's national wheelchair basketball team.

== Club career ==
Pusat started playing wheelchair basketball at the age of ten after she was inspired by a poster of the female national basketball player Işıl Alben, and watching a match of the Beşiktaş JK wheelchair basketball team. She was encouraged by Cem Gezinci, a Wheelchair basketball player of Beşiktaş JK, she met during a match.

She started playing for Aydın ADÜ Genç Eefeler team. In the 2018–19 season, she transferred to the Girls U16 team of the İzmir BB SK. In August 2022, her contract was extended.

As of 2024, she plays as a forward for Beşiktaş JK wheelchair basketball as the only female member.

Pusat plays in the forward position with disability class 2.5.

== International career ==
At the age of 15 only, Pusat debuted internationally playing for the Turkey women's national under-25 wheelchair basketball team at the 2019 Women's U25 Wheelchair Basketball World Championship in Suphanburi, Thailand. She was one of the youngest players of the championship. In 2020, Pusat was selected again to the Turkey women's U25 team.

In June 2023, she took part at the preparation camp of the Turkey women's national wheelchair basketball team in Aksaray, Turkey, and the next month, preparationon camps in Hakkari, Turkey and Tabriz, Iran.

She played at the 2023 IWBF Women's European Championship in Rotterdam, Netherlands.

== Personal life ==
Begüm Pusat was born in 2004. She used a wheelchair because she had the congenital disorder of cerebral palsy, and disorder of movement and posture due to brain damage. Following a long period of physical therapy, she was able to use her paralyzed left hand and left foot.
