= British Wheelchair Basketball =

- Sport: Wheelchair basketball
- No. of teams: 55+
- Country: United Kingdom
- Most recent champion: Jaguars WBC
- Website: britishwheelchairbasketball.co.uk

British Wheelchair Basketball (BWB), formerly named the Great Britain Wheelchair Basketball Association, is a non-profit organisation and the governing body for wheelchair basketball in Great Britain. The organisation represents Great Britain in the IWBF and the women's and the men's national wheelchair basketball team in the British Paralympic Association.

The organisation is responsible for the selection and training of the team that represent Great Britain in international tournaments, including the World Championships and Games of the Paralympiad and the qualifiers therefore, as well as for the promotion of the sport amongst prospective players, spectators, and fans.

== Leagues ==
British Wheelchair Basketball administers a comprehensive national league structure across multiple tiers, catering to players of all abilities, ages, and genders.

=== National League ===
The National League forms the backbone of competitive wheelchair basketball in Great Britain. At the top sits the National League Premier Division, the highest tier of club competition in the country. Below this, the league expands geographically into regional divisions to reduce travel demands on clubs: Division 1 and Division 2 are each split into North and South conferences, while Division 3 operates across three conferences — North, Central, and South — reflecting the broader base of clubs at the grassroots level.

=== Women's League ===
The women's game is served by a dedicated league structure. The Women's Premier League represents the elite tier of women's wheelchair basketball in Great Britain, with the Women's League extending below it across three further divisions, providing a competitive pathway for players at all levels of the women's game.

=== Junior League ===
BWB runs a Junior League split into North and South conferences, providing age-appropriate competitive opportunities for younger players and forming a key part of the talent development pipeline into the senior game.

=== Inspire a Generation Leagues ===
The Inspire a Generation Leagues, branded as Motability Scheme Inspire Leagues for sponsorship reasons, are a series of smaller, locally organised competitions held across the country, sitting below the National League Division 3 structure. Designed specifically for new and developing players, these leagues serve as an accessible entry point into competitive wheelchair basketball, prioritising participation and player development over results.

=== National Championships ===
Each season culminates in the National Championship Finals, an annual knockout tournament that crowns the league champion for each division. The top four teams from every National League division — Premier Division, Division 1, Division 2, and Division 3 — as well as the top four teams from the Women's Premier League, qualify for the event. Competing in a knockout format, the Championships bring together the best clubs from across the country's regional conferences to determine a single national champion for each tier of the game.

== Controversies ==
During the International tournament August 16 2025, ahead of a match at the Wheelchair Basketball Nations Cup in Cologne, the British Team turned their backs on their Israeli opponents during the playing of the Israeli National Anthem. The British Wheelchair Basketball has issued an apology for the team's behaviour.
