= Mine Ercan =

Turkish wheelchair basketball player

Personal information
- National team: Turkey
- Born: November 26, 1987 (age 38)
- Years active: 2006–present

Sport
- Country: Turkey
- Sport: Wheelchair basketball
- Position: Guard
- Disability class: 4.0
- League: Turkish Wheelchair Basketball First League (TSB1L)
- Club: Aydın ESK

Mine Ercan (born November 26, 1987) is a Turkish female wheelchair basketball player in Guard position. The 4-point player is the captain of the Turkey women's national wheelchair basketball team.

== Early life ==
Mine Ecan was born on November 26, 1987. She began playing wheelchair basketball by December 2006. She is a 4 point player in Guard position.

== Career ==
=== Club ===
Currently, Mine Ercan is playing in the Aydın ESK, the wheelchair basketball team of the sports club for disabled people in Aydın, western Turkey. With her national teammate Ebru Gökşen, the two are only female members of the men's team. Her team competes in the First League (TSB1L), the second division league of wheelchair basketball in Turkey.

In 2015, she won the first prize of the women's category, along with two teammates from the national team, Zümeyran Tekçe and Maşide Cesur, at the traditional "Wheelchair Streetball" tournament organized by the Bayrampaşa Municipality in Istanbul. She was named to the All-star team as the only woman among the male sportspeople at the 2017 International Wheelchair Basketball tournament held in Efeler, Aydın Province.

=== International ===
Mine Ercan was admitted to the Turkey women's national wheelchair basketball team early 2007, only 3–4 months after she began her sports career. She took part at the European Women's Wheelchair Basketball Championships in 2007, 2015 and 2017. Currently, she serves as the captain of the national team.
