= Wheelchair basketball at the 2023 European Para Championships =

- Venue: Rotterdam Ahoy
- Location: Rotterdam, Netherlands
- Start date: 11 August
- End date: 19 August
- Competitors: 144 from 12 nations

Wheelchair basketball at the 2023 European Para Championships in Rotterdam, Netherlands was held between 11 and 19 August 2023. It featured two events: men's team and women's team.

The winners and runners-up of the men's and women's teams earned a qualification slot for the 2024 Summer Paralympics.

The losing semi-finalists, and the 5th placed team in the women's tournament booked places in the repechage tournament to decide the final four quota places for each event in Paris 2024.

== Medalists ==
Event	Gold	Silver	Bronze
Men's team	Great Britain	Spain	Netherlands
Women's team	Netherlands	Great Britain	Spain

== Paris 2024 ==
Men's

Great Britain (GBR) qualify for the 2024 Summer Paralympics men's tournament.
Netherlands (NED) Germany (GER) and Spain (ESP) qualify for the 2024 Summer Paralympics Last Chance Tournament.

Women's

Great Britain (GBR) qualify for the 2024 Summer Paralympics women's tournament.
France (FRA), Spain (ESP) and Germany (GER) qualify for the 2024 Summer Paralympics Last Chance Tournament.
