= Hanımzer Melet =

Turkish wheelchair basketball player (born 1993)

Personal information
- Nationality: Turkish
- Born: 7 November 1993 (age 32) Van, Turkey

Sport
- Sport: Women's Wheelchair Basketball
- Club: Van Physically Disabled SC
Medal record
Women's wheelchair basketball
Representing Turkey

Hanımzer Melet (born 7 November 1993) is a Turkish wheelchair basketball player. She is a member of the physically disabled sports club in her hometown Van as the only female player and the Turkey women's national wheelchair basketball team.

== Sport career ==
During the time at the rehab center in Ankara following her injury, she watched disabled people performing sport. She got interested in wheelchair basketball. In 2020, after overcoming psychological problems, she accepted the invitation of the physically disabled sports club in her hometown Van and joined the wheelchair basketball team. She became the only women member of the club's wheelchair basketball team.

Already in her early years, she was called up to the Turkey women's national wheelchair basketball team selection camp. She could not take part due to a foot burn. She was later invited to the natioanal team preparation camp in Hakkari mid July. She debuted internationally at the 2023 IWBF Women's European Championship in Rotterdam, Netherlands, within the 2023 European Para Championships in August.

== Personal life ==
Hanımzer Melet was born in Van, Turkey on 7 November 1993. She lives in Hafiziye neighborhood of İpekyolu district in Van.

In 2016, she fell down from the second floor of her apartment while cleaning the window, and suffered spinal cord injury. She lost her walking ability. She underwent many surgeries in Van and Ankara. She had to use wheelchair.
