= Selin Şahin =

Turkish wheelchair basketball player

Beşiktaş J.K.

Personal information
- Born: 19 September 1992 (age 34) Istanbul, Turkey
- Listed height: 1.60 m (5 ft 3 in)
- Listed weight: 39 kg (86 lb)

Career information
- Playing career: 2010–present

Career history
- 2012–2013: Beşiktaş J.K.
- 2013–2018: Engelli Yıldızlar
- 2018–2019: 1907 Fenerbahçe Engelli Yıldızlar
- 2019–2020: Reggio Calabria BiC
- 2023-present: Beşiktaş J.K.

Latife Selin Şahin (born 19 September 1992) is a Turkish women's wheelchair basketball player. She is a 1-point player competing for Reggio Calabria BiC in Italy. She is a member of the Turkish women's national wheelchair basketball team. She is the first Turkish women's wheelchair basketball player to play in a foreign country.

== Early life ==
Selin Şahin was born in Istanbul on 19 September 1992. At the age of three, she was partially paralyzed with permanent spinal cord damage following a traffic accident.

She lives in the Başakşehir district of Istanbul Province and studies Sports Administration at Istanbul University's Faculty of Sports science. She married Rıdvan Nicolas Erdem (ex Çaykur Rizespor and Gaziantep FK translator) on 25 December 2022.

== Sports career ==
In the first year of high school, her physical education teacher advised her to take up a sport for disabled people, which she ignored. Şahin began playing basketball at the age of 18 after she met Erdem Göksel, the general manager of the women's wheelchair basketball side of Beşiktaş J.K. during a concert held by the Municipality of Başakşehir. Göksel invited her to watch his team play against the Galatasaray women's wheelchair basketball team. She was very impressed and after the match, she decided to take up the sport.

Şahin is 1.60 m (5 ft 3 in) tall at 39 kg (86 lb). She is a 1 point player in the disability sport classification.

=== Club ===
==== Beşiktaş J.K. ====
Şahin joined the Beşiktaş J.K. women's wheelchair basketball team. After one season, she realized that she had "no chance to develop herself" with the club. The team's trainer and general manager told her that they felt she could not succeed as a basketball player and suggested she take up a different sport. She did not want to abandon the sport. To improve her basketball skills, she wanted to transfer to another club.

==== Engelli Yıldızlar & 1907 Fenerbahçe ====
She moved to the Engelli Yıldızlar Kulubü ("Disabled Stars Club"), where she played six seasons. In 2018, the team was taken over by Fenerbahçe S.K., and was renamed 1907 Fenerbahçe Engelli Yıldızlar. She helped this team win the championship title of the Turkish Women's Wheelchair Basketball Super League in the 2018–19 season.

==== Reggio Calabria ====
After returning from the 2019 Women's European Wheelchair Basketball Championship, Division A held between 30 June and 7 July in Rotterdam, Netherlands, where she played for Turkey national team, she received transfer offers from several foreign clubs.

In August 2019, she signed a contract with the Italian club Reggio Calabria in Carrozzina under coach Antonio Cugliandro. In October she began to play in the 2019–20 season.

Murat Saltan, head coach of the Turkey women's national wheelchair basketball team, said Şahin is the first Turkish women's wheelchair basketball player to play in a foreign country.

=== International ===
After playing on Turkey's women's national junior wheelchair basketball team, Şahin was selected for the Turkey women's national wheelchair basketball team and took part in three of their six matches at the 2019 IWBF Women's European Championship Division A match.

== Honors ==
=== Club ===
- Turkish Women's Wheelchair Basketball Super League champion (2018–19)
