= Turkey women's national wheelchair basketball team =

Turkey
- IWBF zone: I WBF Europe
- National federation: Turkish Basketball Federation (TBF)
- Coach: (Turkey) Kamuran Özdemir
Home	Away

The Turkey women's national wheelchair basketball team (Turkish: Türkiye Tekerlekli Sandalye Basketbol Kadın Milli Takımı) is the wheelchair basketball side that represents Turkey in international competitions for women.

The national team finished sixth at the Women's European Wheelchair Basketball Championship held June 28 – July 8, 2013, in Frankfurt, Germany, after losing to Spain with 39–59 in the play-offs.

== Current roster ==
Team roster at the 2023 IWBF Women's European Championship.

Staff
Head coach	Metin İdoğ
Asst. coach	Cengiz Çatal
Asst coach	Elif Eda Çolak
Physiotherapist	Asude Tamam
Mechanic	Haluk Taşkınçay

#	Name	Date of birth and age	Class.	Pos.	Club
6	Serra Uzun	6 March 2002 (age 24)	2.5		Yalova Ortopedikler SK
14	Rabia Akyürek	10 February 1999 (age 27)	2.0	F	Pendik An.Yakası
16	Zümeyran Polat	16 January 1996 (age 30)	4.0	F	Lotus Engelliler GSK
24	Hanımzer Melet	7 November 1993 (age 32)			Van BEKS
35	Begüm Pusat	2004 (age 21–22)	2.5	F	Beşiktaş JK

== Former players ==
- Hatice Atay (born 1996)
- Mine Ercan (born 1987)
- Zehra Özbey Torun (born 1982)
- Meryem Tan (born 1999)
- Selin Şahin (born 1992)

=== European Wheelchair Basketball Championship ===
Year	Position	W	L
(Germany) 2007			
(United Kingdom) 2009			
(Israel) 2011	5th		
(Germany) 2013	6th	2	4
(United Kingdom) 2015			
(Spain) 2017	6th	0	5
(Netherlands) 2019	6th	0	6
(Spain) 2021	6th	0	6
(Netherlands) 2023	6th	0	6
Total	-	2	27

== See also ==
- Turkey men's national wheelchair basketball team
