= Arab Wheelchair Basketball Championship =

Arab Wheelchair Basketball Championship Open Arab Championships

== Results ==
=== Men ===
Edition	Year	Host (final location)	Gold medal game			Bronze medal game		
Edition	Year	Host (final location)	Gold	Score	Silver	Bronze	Score	Fourth place
1	2011	Agadir (Morocco)	Morocco	62-47	Iraq	Egypt	-	Turkey
2	2016	Agadir (Morocco)	Algeria	71-36	Morocco	South Africa	68-56	Iraq
3	2020	Agadir (Morocco)	Morocco	62-44	Algeria	Iraq	58-43	Egypt

== See also ==
- Africa Wheelchair Basketball Championship
- Asia Oceania Wheelchair Basketball Championships
- European Wheelchair Basketball Championship
- Pan American Wheelchair Basketball Championship
