= 2021 IWBF Women's European Championship =

- Venue: Centro Deportivo Municipal Marqués de Samaranch
- Location: Madrid, Spain
- Start date: 5 December
- End date: 12 December
- Competitors: 6 teams from 6 nations

Medalists
gold medal	Netherlands
silver medal	Great Britain
bronze medal	Spain

The 2021 IWBF Women's European Championship was the 18th edition of the European Wheelchair Basketball Championship and was held in Madrid, Spain from 5 to 12 December 2021.

The Dutch and British teams reached the final after winning their respective semi-final games. The Netherlands were declared winner of the tournament following the withdrawal of Great Britain. After two members of the British women's team tested positive for COVID-19, the British decided to withdraw from the tournament and return home without playing the final. Spain took the bronze medal after winning the third place game from Germany.

The top four teams of the tournament qualified for the 2022 World Championships in Dubai.

== Format ==
The six teams that qualified for the tournament competed in a preliminary round to determine the top four teams that advanced to the semi-finals.

Each team has a squad of twelve players for the tournament. Players are given an eight-level-score specific to wheelchair basketball, ranging from 1 to 4.5. Lower scores represent a higher degree of disability. The sum score of the five players on the court cannot exceed 14.

== Preliminary round ==
All times local (UTC+01:00)

Standings

Pos	Team	Pld	W	L	PF	PA	PD	Pts	Qualification
1	Netherlands	5	5	0	372	163	+209	10	Semi-finals
2	Great Britain	5	3	2	312	198	+114	8	Semi-finals
3	Germany	5	3	2	252	198	+54	8	Semi-finals
4	Spain	5	3	2	285	220	+65	8	Semi-finals
5	France	5	1	4	139	331	−192	6	Fifth place game
6	Turkey	5	0	5	90	340	−250	5	Fifth place game

Source: EPC
Rules for classification: 1) Wins; 2) Head-to-head results; 3) Points difference; 4) Points scored.

5 December
10:00

Report

Great Britain	85–16	Spain
Scoring by quarter: 20–12, 24–0, 22–4, 19–0

Centro Deportivo Municipal Marqués de Samaranch
Madrid

5 December
15:30

Report

Netherlands	63–35	Germany
Scoring by quarter: 16–10, 14–10, 13–12, 20–3

Centro Deportivo Municipal Marqués de Samaranch
Madrid

5 December
16:45

Report

Spain	80–11	Turkey
Scoring by quarter: 26–0, 9–3, 25–6, 20–2

Centro Deportivo Municipal Marqués de Samaranch
Madrid

6 December
10:00

Report

Germany	55–34	Spain
Scoring by quarter: 10–6, 13–12, 18–6, 14–10

Centro Deportivo Municipal Marqués de Samaranch
Madrid

6 December
13:15

Report

France	28–81	Netherlands
Scoring by quarter: 3–25, 5–22, 8–15, 12–21

Centro Deportivo Municipal Marqués de Samaranch
Madrid

6 December
14:30

Report

Turkey	12–78	Great Britain
Scoring by quarter: 2–21, 4–14, 2–17, 4–26

Centro Deportivo Municipal Marqués de Samaranch
Madrid

7 December
12:15

Report

Netherlands	74–44	Great Britain
Scoring by quarter: 24–14, 16–12, 17–10, 17–8

Centro Deportivo Municipal Marqués de Samaranch
Madrid

7 December
14:30

Report

Spain	76–26	France
Scoring by quarter: 19–7, 22–4, 21–6, 14–9

Centro Deportivo Municipal Marqués de Samaranch
Madrid

7 December
15:30

Report

Germany	56–27	Spain
Scoring by quarter: 16–6, 12–8, 14–7, 14–6

Centro Deportivo Municipal Marqués de Samaranch
Madrid

8 December
12:15

Report

France	21–66	Germany
Scoring by quarter: 2–14, 6–19, 8–14, 5–19

Centro Deportivo Municipal Marqués de Samaranch
Madrid

8 December
14:30

Report

Netherlands	78–17	Turkey
Scoring by quarter: 26–2, 17–7, 24–2, 11–6

Centro Deportivo Municipal Marqués de Samaranch
Madrid

8 December
15:30

Report

Great Britain	52–56	Spain
Scoring by quarter: 18–8, 12–19, 14–16, 8–13

Centro Deportivo Municipal Marqués de Samaranch
Madrid

9 December
10:00

Report

Turkey	23–48	France
Scoring by quarter: 10–13, 4–14, 3–11, 6–10

Centro Deportivo Municipal Marqués de Samaranch
Madrid

9 December
12:15

Report

Germany	40–53	Great Britain
Scoring by quarter: 8–8, 8–15, 12–15, 12–15

Centro Deportivo Municipal Marqués de Samaranch
Madrid

9 December
13:15

Report

Spain	39–76	Netherlands
Scoring by quarter: 10–19, 6–19, 11–24, 12–14

Centro Deportivo Municipal Marqués de Samaranch
Madrid

== Knock-out stage ==
Semi-finals
10 December
Netherlands	68
Spain	33
10 December
Great Britain	58
Germany	51

Final
12 December
Netherlands	20
Great Britain	0 (Note: After two members of the British women's team tested positive for COVID-19, the British decided to withdraw from the tournament and return home without playing the final. In accordance with regulations, the game was considered forfeited and therefore awarded to the opposing team with a default regulatory 20–0 score.)
Third place
12 December
Spain	58
Germany	40

=== Semi-finals ===
10 December
12:15

Report

Netherlands	68–33	Spain
Scoring by quarter: 21–6, 10–7, 18–6, 19–14

Centro Deportivo Municipal Marqués de Samaranch
Madrid

10 December
16:45

Report

Great Britain	58–51	Germany
Scoring by quarter: 12–7, 13–10, 23–15, 10–19

Centro Deportivo Municipal Marqués de Samaranch
Madrid

=== Fifth place game ===
10 December
13:15

Report

France	42–35	Turkey
Scoring by quarter: 8–8, 14–11, 10–11, 10–5

Centro Deportivo Municipal Marqués de Samaranch
Madrid

=== Third place game ===
12 December
12:30

Report

Germany	40–58	Spain
Scoring by quarter: 8–16, 10–12, 15–14, 7–16

Centro Deportivo Municipal Marqués de Samaranch
Madrid

=== Final ===
12 December
12:30

Report

Netherlands	20–0	Great Britain

Centro Deportivo Municipal Marqués de Samaranch
Madrid

== Final standings ==
Rank	Team
1	Netherlands
2	Great Britain
3	Spain
4	Germany
5	France
6	Turkey

== See also ==
- 2021 IWBF Men's European Championship
