= Wheelchair Basketball World Championship =

International wheelchair basketball competition

- Sport: Wheelchair basketball
- Founded: 1973 M / 1990 W
- Country: IWBF members
- Continent: IWBF (International)

The IWBF World Wheelchair Basketball Championship (World Championships from 1973 to 2002 (2006) known as Gold Cup) is an international wheelchair basketball competition contested by the men's and the women's national teams of the members of the International Wheelchair Basketball Federation (IWBF), the sport's global governing body.

The first unofficial Wheelchair Basketball World Championships for men was held in 1973, with Bruges, Belgium being the first host city. The unofficial world championship for men was won by Great Britain, with a team that included Philip Craven, who would later become the President of the International Paralympic Committee (IPC). Bruges, Belgium also hosted the first official World Championships, known as the Gold Cup tournament, in 1975.

The men's world championships has been won seven times by the United States, twice each by Australia and Great Britain (one of which being the unofficial Championship in 1973), and once each by Israel, France and Canada. Wheelchair basketball world championships for women have been held since 1990. In the first ten women's world championships, Canada has won five world titles, the United States won three, and the Netherlands two.

== Winners ==
Number	Year	Host	Men	Women
1	1973*	Bruges (Belgium)	Great Britain	–
2	1975	Bruges (Belgium)	Israel	–
3	1979	Tampa (United States)	United States	–
4	1983	Halifax (Canada)	United States	–
5	1986	Melbourne (Australia)	United States	–
6	1990	Bruges (Belgium)	France	–
6		Saint-Étienne (France)	–	United States
7	1994	Edmonton (Canada)	United States	–
7		Stoke Mandeville (Great Britain)	–	Canada
8	1998	Sydney (Australia)	United States	Canada
9	2002	Kitakyushu (Japan)	United States	Canada
10	2006	Amsterdam (Netherlands)	Canada	Canada
11	2010	Birmingham (United Kingdom)	Australia	United States
12	2014	Incheon (South Korea)	Australia	–
12		Toronto (Canada)	–	Canada
13	2018	Hamburg (Germany)	Great Britain	Netherlands
14	2022	Dubai (United Arab Emirates)	United States	Netherlands
15	2026	Ottawa (Canada)	Australia	United States

* Unofficial Championship

== Results ==
=== Men ===
Year	Dates	Host (final location)	Gold medal game			Bronze medal game
Year	Dates	Host (final location)	Gold	Score	Silver	Bronze	Score	Fourth place
1973*; Details		Belgium (Bruges)	Great Britain	50–37	France	Netherlands	–	Germany
1975; Details	28-31 July; 16 Sept (Finals)	Belgium (Bruges)	Israel	50–47	United States	Great Britain	–	Netherlands
1979; Details	9-13 May	United States (Tampa)	United States	60–49	Netherlands	France	–	Israel
1983; Details	23-28 May	Canada (Halifax)	United States	86–67	France	Sweden	–	Israel
1986; Details	6-12 April	Australia (Melbourne)	United States	61–40	Canada	Netherlands	–	France
1990; Details	5-10 August	Belgium (Bruges)	France	62–61	United States	Canada	–	Netherlands
1994; Details	21-30 July	Canada (Edmonton)	United States	67–53	Great Britain	Canada	72–62	France
1998; Details	23-30 October	Australia (Sydney)	United States	61–59	Netherlands	Canada	63–56	Australia
2002; Details	23-31 August	Japan (Kitakyushu)	United States	64–55	Great Britain	Canada	58–47	Australia
2006; Details	6-15 July	Netherlands (Amsterdam)	Canada	59–41	United States	Australia	80–53	Netherlands
2010; Details	7-17 July	Great Britain (Birmingham)	Australia	79–69	France	United States	71–42	Italy
2014; Details	5-14 July	South Korea (Incheon)	Australia	63–57	United States	Turkey	68–63	Spain
2018; Details	16-26 August	Germany (Hamburg)	Great Britain	79–62	United States	Australia	68–57	Iran
2022; Details	9–20 June 2023	United Arab Emirates (Dubai)	United States	67–66	Great Britain	Iran	72–54	Netherlands
2026; Details	9–19 September	Canada (Ottawa)	Australia	81–57	Italy	Great Britain	67–56	Germany

* Unofficial Championship

=== Women ===
Year	Dates	Host (final location)	Gold medal game			Bronze medal game
Year	Dates	Host (final location)	Gold	Score	Silver	Bronze	Score	Fourth place
1990; Details	5-11 July	France (Saint-Étienne)	United States	58–55	Germany	Canada	–	Netherlands
1994; Details	6-13 August	Great Britain (Stoke Mandeville)	Canada	45–34	United States	Australia	38–36	Netherlands
1998; Details	26-30 Oct	Australia (Sydney)	Canada	54–38	United States	Australia	40–35	Japan
2002; Details	26-31 August	Japan (Kitakyushu)	Canada	51–46	United States	Australia	43–39	Japan
2006; Details	8-14 July	Netherlands (Amsterdam)	Canada	58–50	United States	Germany	52–48	Australia
2010; Details	7-16 July	Great Britain (Birmingham)	United States	55–53	Germany	Canada	59–49	Australia
2014; Details	20-28 July	Canada (Toronto)	Canada	54–50	Germany	Netherlands	74–58	United States
2018; Details	16-26 August	Germany (Hamburg)	Netherlands	56–40	Great Britain	Germany	44–43	China
2022; Details	9–20 June 2023	United Arab Emirates (Dubai)	Netherlands	57–34	China	United States	57–42	Germany
2026; Details	9–19 September	Canada (Ottawa)	United States	77–76	Canada	Netherlands	63–50	Great Britain

== Medals ==
=== Men (1973–2026) ===
Rank	Nation	Gold	Silver	Bronze	Total
1	United States	7	5	1	13
2	Australia	3	0	2	5
3	Great Britain	2	3	2	7
4	France	1	3	1	5
5	Canada	1	1	4	6
6	Israel	1	0	0	1
7	Netherlands	0	2	2	4
8	Italy	0	1	0	1
9	Iran	0	0	1	1
9	Sweden	0	0	1	1
9	Turkey	0	0	1	1
Totals (11 entries)		15	15	15	45

=== Women (1990–2026) ===
Rank	Nation	Gold	Silver	Bronze	Total
1	Canada	5	1	2	8
2	United States	3	4	1	8
3	Netherlands	2	0	2	4
4	Germany	0	3	2	5
5	China	0	1	0	1
5	Great Britain	0	1	0	1
7	Australia	0	0	3	3
Totals (7 entries)		10	10	10	30

== Nations ==
=== Men ===
Year	1st	2nd	3rd	4th	5th	6th	7th	8th	9th	10th	11th	12th	13th	14th	15th	16th
1973	GBR	FRA	NED	GER	BEL	SWE	ESP	SUI								
1975	ISR	USA	GBR	NED	SWE	ITA	CAN	GER	BEL	SUI	POL					
1979	USA	NED	FRA	ISR	CAN	SWE	ESP	GBR	BEL							
1983	USA	FRA	SWE	ISR	NED	CAN	GER	GBR	JPN	BEL	AUS					
1986	USA	CAN	NED	FRA	ISR	SWE	YUG	ITA	GER	AUS	GBR					
1990	FRA	USA	CAN	NED	AUS	GER	JPN	SWE	BEL	ITA	AUT	GBR				
1994	USA	GBR	CAN	FRA	NED	AUS	ESP	SWE	GER	ARG	JPN	ISR				
1998	USA	NED	CAN	AUS	GBR	ESP	FRA	FIN	JPN	MEX	KOR	EGY				
2002	USA	GBR	CAN	AUS	GER	FRA	NED	JPN	ISR	BRA	KOR	RSA				
2006	CAN	USA	AUS	NED	GBR	SWE	JPN	ITA	BRA	ISR	FRA	RSA				
2010	AUS	FRA	USA	ITA	GBR	POL	CAN	TUR	MEX	JPN	KOR	ALG				
2014	AUS	USA	TUR	ESP	ITA	KOR	GBR	IRI	JPN	COL	GER	ARG	SWE	MEX	NED	ALG
2018	GBR	USA	AUS	IRI	ESP	POL	ARG	TUR	JPN	NED	ITA	CAN	GER	KOR	BRA	MAR
2022	USA	GBR	IRI	NED	ITA	CAN	AUS	GER	FRA	BRA	ARG	THA	KOR	EGY	IRQ	UAE

=== Women ===
Year	1st	2nd	3rd	4th	5th	6th	7th	8th	9th	10th	11th	12th
1990	USA	GER	CAN	NED	FRA	AUS	GBR	ESP				
1994	CAN	USA	AUS	NED	GER	GBR	JPN	FRA	ISR	ESP		
1998	CAN	USA	AUS	JPN	GER	NED	GBR	MEX				
2002	CAN	USA	AUS	JPN	MEX	NED	GER	GBR				
2006	CAN	USA	GER	AUS	NED	JPN	MEX	FRA				
2010	USA	GER	CAN	AUS	NED	GBR	JPN	CHN	MEX	BRA		
2014	CAN	GER	NED	USA	GBR	AUS	CHN	FRA	JPN	MEX	BRA	PER
2018	NED	GBR	GER	CHN	CAN	USA	ESP	FRA	AUS	BRA	ARG	ALG
2022	NED	CHN	USA	GER	CAN	AUS	JPN	ESP	GBR	BRA	THA	ALG
2026	USA	CAN	NED	GBR	CHN	ESP	GER	JPN	BRA	AUS	FRA	ALG

== Events ==
- Wheelchair basketball at the Summer Paralympics
- Wheelchair Eurobasket
- European Wheelchair Basketball Championship
- IWBF U23 World Wheelchair Basketball Championship
- Africa Wheelchair Basketball Championship
- IWBF Champions Cup
- André Vergauwen Cup
- Willi Brinkmann Cup
- IWBF Challenge Cup
- Kitakyushu Champions Cup
- Wheelchair Basketball Intercontinental Cup June 2023 in Turkey.
- NCC 2023 International Köln. Nations Cup Cologne 2023 Continental Cup
- 2023 Easter Tournament Wheelchair Basketball - The Easter Tournament Wheelchair Basketball - fifteenth edition in 2023. Six teams - between 7-9 April in Belgium.
- May 3, 2023. TOKYO — Official 3×3 wheelchair basketball tournaments, the first of their kind in Japan, have been held since last autumn.
- 2023 Osaka Cup - from February 10-12, 2023, in Osaka, Japan.
