= 2019 IWBF Women's European Championship =

Basketball competition

- Location: Rotterdam, Netherlands
- Start date: 30 June
- End date: 7 July
- Competitors: 6 teams from 6 nations

Medalists
gold medal	Netherlands
silver medal	Great Britain
bronze medal	Germany

The 2019 IWBF Women's European Championship was the 17th edition of the European Wheelchair Basketball Championship held in Rotterdam, Netherlands from 30 June to 7 July 2019.

== Squads ==
Each of the 6 teams selected a squad of 12 players for the tournament.

Athletes are given an eight-level-score specific to wheelchair basketball, ranging from 0.5 to 4.5. Lower scores represent a higher degree of disability. The sum score of all players on the court cannot exceed 14.

== Preliminary round ==
All times local (UTC+01:00)

Team̹̹	Pld	W	L	PF	PA	PD	Pts
Netherlands	5	5	0	322	195	+1127	10
Germany	5	4	1	304	194	+9110	9
Great Britain	5	3	2	297	189	+108	8
Spain	5	2	3	232	243	-11	7
France	5	1	4	165	292	-127	6
Turkey	5	0	5	123	330	-207	5

30 June
16:00

report

Netherlands	59–36	Spain

ECWA court

30 June
18:15

report

Great Britain	66–18	France

ECWA court

30 June
20:30

report

Germany	59–17	Turkey

ECWA cour

1 July
16:00

report

France	31–69	Germany

ECWA Court

1 July
18:15

report

Turkey	22–75	Netherlands

ECWA Court

1 July
20:30

report

Great Britain	56–29	Spain

ECWA Court

2 July
16:00

report

France	51–31	Turkey

ECWA Court

2 July
18:15

report

Spain	43–64	Germany

ECWA Court

2 July
20:30

report

Netherlands	61–52	Great Britain

ECWA Court

3 SJuly
16:00

report

Turkey	20–75	Great Britain

ECWA Court

3 July
18:15

report

Germany	51–55	Netherlands

ECWA Court

3 July
20:30

report

Spain	54–31	France

ECWA Court

4 July
16:00

report

Great Britain	48–61	Germany

ECWA Court

4 July
18:15

report

Turkey	33–70	Spain

ECWA Court

4 July
20:30

report

Netherlands	72–34	France

ECWA Court

== Knockout stage ==
=== Brackets ===
Semi-finals

Semi-finals
6 July 2019
Germany	48
Great Britain	49
6 July 2019
Netherlands	67
Spain	31

Final
7 July 2019
Netherlands	65
Great Britain	52
Third place
7 July 2019
Germany	53
Spain	38

=== Semi-finals ===
6 July
13:00

report

Germany	48–49	Great Britain

ECWA Court

6 July
16:00

Netherlands	57–31	Spain

ECWA Court

=== 5th place ===
7 July
10:00

report

France	56–46	Turkey

ECWA Court

=== 3rd place ===
7 July
12:30

report

Germany	53–38	Spain

ECWA Court

=== Final ===
7 July
15:00

report

Netherlands	65–52	Great Britain

ECWA Court

== Final standings ==
Rank	Team
1	Netherlands
2	Great Britain
3	Germany
4	Spain
5	France
6	Turkey

2019 IWBF Women's European Championship

Netherlands
7th title
