= 2023 IWBF Women's European Championship =

- Venue: Rotterdam Ahoy
- Location: Rotterdam, Netherlands
- Start date: 11 August
- End date: 18 August
- Competitors: 6 teams from 6 nations

Medalists
gold medal	Netherlands
silver medal	Great Britain
bronze medal	Spain

The 2023 IWBF Women's European Championship was the 19th edition of the European Wheelchair Basketball Championship. It took place from 11 to 18 August 2023 in Rotterdam, Netherlands.

The wheelchair basketball tournament was part of the first edition of the European Para Championships, a quadrennial multi-sport event that is to take place each pre-Paralympic year. The winner and runner-up of this tournament qualified for the 2024 Summer Paralympics in Paris.

== Format ==
The six teams that qualified for the tournament compete in a preliminary round to determine the top four teams that advance to the knockout stage.

Each team has a squad of twelve players for the tournament. Players are given an eight-level-score specific to wheelchair basketball, ranging from 1 to 4.5. Lower scores represent a higher degree of disability. The sum score of all players on the court cannot exceed 14.

== Preliminary round ==
All times local (UTC+02:00)

Standings

Pos	Team	Pld	W	L	PF	PA	PD	Pts	Qualification
1	Netherlands	5	5	0	377	166	+211	10	Semi-finals
2	Germany	5	4	1	258	208	+50	9	Semi-finals
3	Great Britain	5	3	2	314	206	+108	8	Semi-finals
4	Spain	5	2	3	262	247	+15	7	Semi-finals
5	France	5	1	4	167	301	−134	6	Fifth place game
6	Turkey	5	0	5	108	358	−250	5	Fifth place game

Source: IWBF
Rules for classification: 1) Wins; 2) Head-to-head results; 3) Points difference; 4) Points scored.

11 August
9:00

Report

Spain	73–28	Turkey
Scoring by quarter: 21–6, 17–11, 14–6, 21–5

Rotterdam Ahoy
Rotterdam

11 August
10:00

Report

Great Britain	43–48	Germany
Scoring by quarter: 4–11, 12–12, 8–7, 19–18

Rotterdam Ahoy
Rotterdam

11 August
17:30

Report

Netherlands	97–35	France
Scoring by quarter: 23–8, 22–5, 31–14, 21–8

Rotterdam Ahoy
Rotterdam

12 August
10:00

Report

Germany	30–75	Netherlands
Scoring by quarter: 6–15, 8–21, 6–22, 10–17

Rotterdam Ahoy
Rotterdam

12 August
16:30

Report

Turkey	15–83	Great Britain
Scoring by quarter: 0–22, 3–23, 6–27, 6–11

Rotterdam Ahoy
Rotterdam

12 August
17:30

Report

France	27–52	Spain
Scoring by quarter: 0–0, 14–30, 5–18, 8–4

Rotterdam Ahoy
Rotterdam

13 August
10:00

Report

Great Britain	70–53	Spain
Scoring by quarter: 18–12, 16–16, 21–10, 15–15

Rotterdam Ahoy
Rotterdam

13 August
11:30

Report

Germany	51–25	France
Scoring by quarter: 15–5, 16–4, 8–6, 12–10

Rotterdam Ahoy
Rotterdam

13 August
20:00

Report

Netherlands	76–12	Turkey
Scoring by quarter: 23–2, 19–4, 24–0, 10–6

Rotterdam Ahoy
Rotterdam

14 August
12:30

Report

Turkey	20–72	Germany
Scoring by quarter: 2–22, 4–17, 12–19, 2–14

Rotterdam Ahoy
Rotterdam

14 August
15:00

Report

Great Britain	68–26	France
Scoring by quarter: 18–10, 15–8, 21–4, 14–4

Rotterdam Ahoy
Rotterdam

14 August
16:30

Report

Spain	39–65	Netherlands
Scoring by quarter: 12–20, 6–21, 12–11, 9–13

Rotterdam Ahoy
Rotterdam

15 August
9:00

Report

Germany	57–45	Spain
Scoring by quarter: 13–14, 12–5, 18–9, 14–17

Rotterdam Ahoy
Rotterdam

15 August
10:00

Report

France	54–33	Turkey
Scoring by quarter: 17–8, 8–7, 23–10, 6–8

Rotterdam Ahoy
Rotterdam

15 August
20:00

Report

Netherlands	64–50	Great Britain
Scoring by quarter: 18–16, 14–8, 19–16, 13–10

Rotterdam Ahoy
Rotterdam

== Knock-out stage ==
Semi-finals
16 August
Netherlands	64
Spain	31
16 August
Germany	32
Great Britain	55

Final
18 August
Netherlands	58
Great Britain	36
Third place
18 August
Germany	48
Spain	49

=== Semi-finals ===
16 August
17:30

Report

Spain	31–64	Netherlands
Scoring by quarter: 8–13, 4–16, 9–20, 10–15

Rotterdam Ahoy
Rotterdam

16 August
20:00

Report

Great Britain	55–32	Germany
Scoring by quarter: 12–15, 21–8, 13–5, 9–4

Rotterdam Ahoy
Rotterdam

=== Fifth place game ===
18 August
15:00

Report

Turkey	23–57	France
Scoring by quarter: 4–18, 6–10, 7–15, 6–14

Rotterdam Ahoy
Rotterdam

=== Third place game ===
18 August
17:30

Report

Germany	48–49 (OT)	Spain
Scoring by quarter: 6–12, 9–16, 12–5, 18–12, Overtime: 3–4

Rotterdam Ahoy
Rotterdam

=== Final ===
18 August
20:00

Report

Netherlands	58–36	Great Britain
Scoring by quarter: 13–9, 15–6, 8–9, 22–12

Rotterdam Ahoy
Rotterdam

== Final standings ==
Rank	Team
1	Netherlands
2	Great Britain
3	Spain
4	Germany
5	France
6	Turkey

== See also ==
- 2023 IWBF Men's European Championship
