= Netherlands women's national wheelchair basketball team =

Netherlands sports team

Netherlands
- IWBF zone: Europe
- National federation: NBB
- Coach: Joost van Rangelrooij
- Nickname: Orange Lions

Paralympic Games
- Appearances: 10
- Medals: :2:1:4

World Championships
- Appearances: 10
- Medals: :2:0:2

European Championship
- Appearances: 19
- Medals: :10:8:1
Home	Away
Medal record
Paralympic Games
Gold medal – first place	2020 Tokyo
Silver medal – second place	1996 Atlanta
Bronze medal – third place	1988 Seoul
Bronze medal – third place	1992 Barcelona
Bronze medal – third place	2012 London
Bronze medal – third place	2016 Rio de Janeiro
World Championships
Gold medal – first place	2018 Hamburg
Gold medal – first place	2022 Dubai
Bronze medal – third place	2014 Toronto
Bronze medal – third place	2026 Ottawa
European Championships
Gold medal – first place	1989 Charleville-Mézières
Gold medal – first place	1993 Berlin
Gold medal – first place	1995 Delden
Gold medal – first place	1997 Madrid
Gold medal – first place	2013 Frankfurt
Gold medal – first place	2017 Adeje
Gold medal – first place	2019 Rotterdam
Gold medal – first place	2021 Madrid
Gold medal – first place	2023 Rotterdam
Gold medal – first place	2025 Sarajevo
Silver medal – second place	1991 El Ferrol
Silver medal – second place	1999 Roermond
Silver medal – second place	2003 Hamburg
Silver medal – second place	2005 Villeneuve-d'Ascq
Silver medal – second place	2007 Wetzlar
Silver medal – second place	2009 Stoke Mandeville
Silver medal – second place	2011 Nazareth
Silver medal – second place	2015 Worcester
Bronze medal – third place	1987 Lorient

The Netherlands women's national wheelchair basketball team represents the Netherlands in international women's wheelchair basketball competitions. The team is known as the Orange Lions. The Dutch women's team is two-time Paralympic champion (2020, 2024), two-time world champion (2018, 2023) and ten-time European champion.

The team won the women's tournament at the 2020 Summer Paralympics held in Tokyo, Japan.

== Paralympic Games ==
Year	#	Pld	W	L
(Israel) 1968 Tel Aviv	Did not qualify			
(Germany) 1972 Heidelberg	Did not qualify			
(Canada) 1976 Toronto	Did not qualify			
(Netherlands) 1980 Arnhem	Did not qualify			
(United Kingdom) 1984 Stoke Mandeville	?			
(South Korea) 1988 Seoul	3rd	6	4	2
(Spain) 1992 Barcelona	3rd	5	3	2
(United States) 1996 Atlanta	2nd	5	3	2
(Australia) 2000 Sydney	4th	5	2	3
(Greece) 2004 Athens	7th	6	1	5
(China) 2008 Beijing	6th	7	3	4
(United Kingdom) 2012 London	3rd	7	5	2
(Brazil) 2016 Rio de Janeiro	3rd	7	5	2
(Japan) 2020 Tokyo	1st	7	6	1
(France) 2024 Paris	1st	6	6	0
Total	11/15	61	38	23

== World Championships ==
Year	#	Pld	W	L
(France) 1990 Saint-Étienne	4th			
(United Kingdom) 1994 Stoke Mandeville	4th			
(Australia) 1998 Sydney	6th			
(Japan) 2002 Kitakyushu	6th			
(Netherlands) 2006 Amsterdam	5th			
(United Kingdom) 2010 Birmingham	5th	7	4	3
(Canada) 2014 Toronto	3rd	8	7	1
(Germany) 2018 Hamburg	1st	8	8	0
(United Arab Emirates) 2022 Dubai	1st	8	8	0
(Canada) 2026 Ottawa	3rd	8	6	2
Total	10/10			

== See also ==
- Netherlands men's national wheelchair basketball team
