= 2 point player =

Wheelchair basketball classification

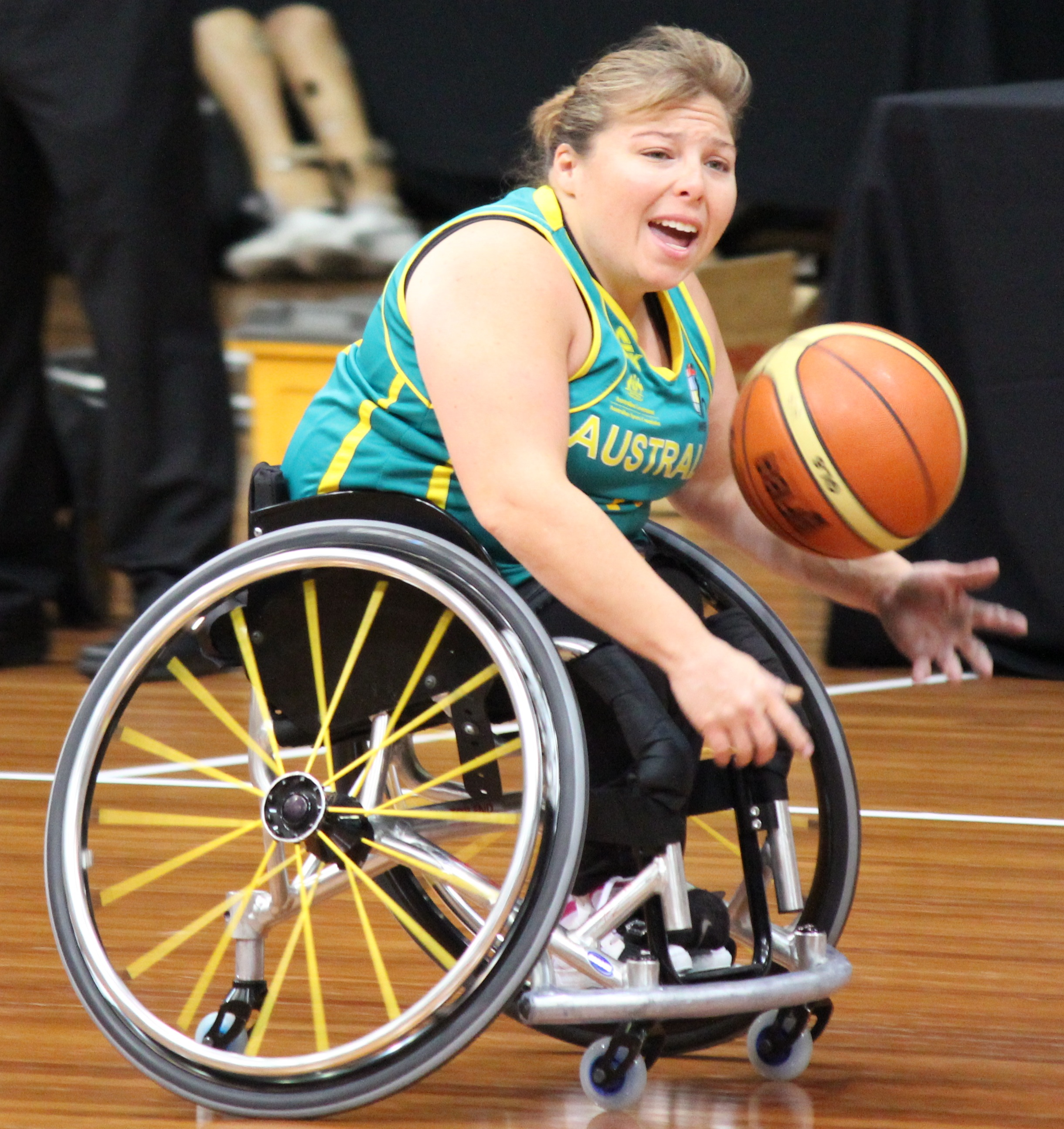
Australia's Kylie Gauci is a 2-point player.

2 point player and 2.5 point player is a disability sport classification for wheelchair basketball. People in this class have partial trunk control when making forward motions. The class includes people with T8-L1 paraplegia, post-polio paralysis and amputations. People in this class handle the ball less than higher-point players. They have some stability issues on court, and may hold their wheel when trying to one hand grab rebounds.

The class includes people with amputations. Amputees are put into this class depending on the length of their stumps and if they play using prosthetic legs. Classification into this classes has four phases. They are a medical assessment, observation during training, observation during competition and assessment. Observation during training may include a game of one on one. Once put into this class, it is very difficult to be classified out of it.

During the 2000s, there was a lot of discussion in the United States about how to increase participation of players in this class. One suggestion was to allow able bodied people to participate to give players in this class more time on the floor. Another one involved changing the classification system used domestically to align with the one used internationally by the IWBF,

People in this class include Australia players Grant Mizens and Kylie Gauci.

== Definition ==
This classification is for wheelchair basketball. Classification for the sport is done by the International Wheelchair Basketball Federation. Classification is extremely important in wheelchair basketball because when players' point totals are added together, they cannot exceed fourteen points per team on the court at any time. Jane Buckley, writing for the Sporting Wheelies, describes the wheelchair basketball players in this classification as players having, "No lower limb but partial trunk control in a forward direction. Rely on hand grip to remain stable in a collision."

The Australian Paralympic Committee defines this classification as, "Players with some partially controlled trunk movement in the forward direction, but no controlled sideways movement. They have upper trunk rotation but poor lower trunk rotation." The International Wheelchair Basketball Federation defines a 2-point player as, "Some partially controlled trunk movement in the forward direction, but no controlled sideways movement, has upper trunk rotation but poor lower trunk rotation." The Cardiff Celts, a wheelchair basketball team in Wales, explain this classification as, "mild to moderate loss of stability in the lower trunk. [...] Typical Class 2 Disabilities include : T8-L1 paraplegia, post-polio paralysis without control of lower extremity movement."

A player can be classified as a 2.5 point player if they display characteristics of a 2-point player and 3 point player, and it is not easy to determine exactly which of these two classes the player fits in.

== Strategy and on court ability ==
2 point players need to put one hand on their chair's wheel for stability when trying to rebound. This is because of stability issues. When pushing themselves around the court, they do not require the back of their chair to maintain stable forward movement.

There is a significant difference in special endurance between 2 point players, and 3 and 4 point players, with 2 point players having less special endurance. 1 point and 2 point players handle the ball the least on court.

== Disability groups ==
=== Amputees ===
People with amputations may compete in this class. This includes A1and A9 ISOD classified players. Because of the potential for balance issues related to having an amputation, during weight training, amputees are encouraged to use a spotter when lifting more than 15 pounds (6.8 kg).

==== Lower limb amputees ====
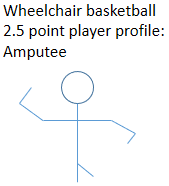
Profile of an A1 classified player competing as a 2.5 point player.

ISOD classified A1 players may be found in this class. This ISOD class is for people who have both legs amputated above the knee. There is a lot of variation though in which IWBF class these players may be put into. Those with hip articulations are generally classified as 3 point players, while those with slightly longer leg stumps in this class are 3.5 point players. Lower limb amputations effect a person's energy cost for being mobile. To keep their oxygen consumption rate similar to people without lower limb amputations, they need to walk slower. A1 basketball players use around 120% more oxygen to walk or run the same distance as someone without a lower limb amputation.

==== Upper and lower limb amputees ====
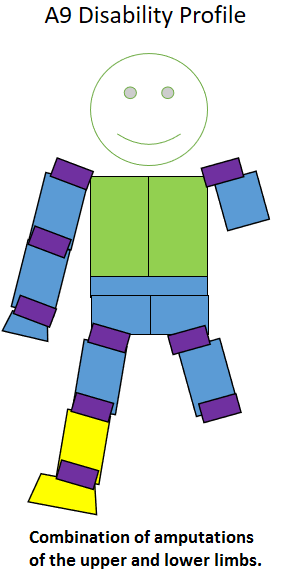
Type of amputation for an A9 classified sportsperson.

ISOD classified A9 players may be found in this class. The class they play in will be specific to the location of their amputations and their lengths. Players with hip disarticulation in both legs are 3.0 point players while players with two slightly longer above the knee amputations are 3.5 point players. Players with one hip disarticulation may be 3.5 point players or 4 point players. People with amputations longer than 2/3rds the length of their thigh when wearing a prosthesis are generally 4.5 point players. Those with shorter amputations are 4 point players. At this point, the classification system for people in this class then considers the nature of the hand amputation by subtracting points to assign a person to a class. A wrist disarticulation moves a player down a point class while a pair of hand amputations moves a player down two point classes, with players with upper limb amputations ending up as low as a 1. point player.

=== Spinal cord injuries ===
==== F5 ====
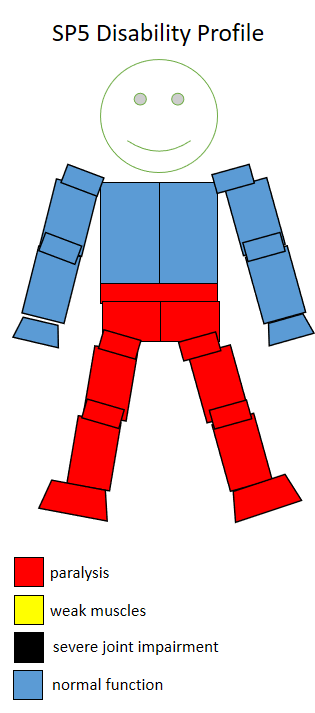
Functional profile of a wheelchair sportsperson in the F5 class.

This is wheelchair sport classification that corresponds to the neurological level T8 - L1. In the past, this class was known as Lower 3, or Upper 4. The location of lesions on different vertebrae tend to be associated with disability levels and functionality issues. T12 and L1 are associated with abdominal innervation complete. Disabled Sports USA defined the anatomical definition of this class in 2003 as, "Normal upper limb function. Have abdominal muscles and spinal extensors (upper or more commonly upper and lower). May have non-functional hip flexors (grade 1). Have no abductor function." People in this class have good sitting balance. People with lesions located between T9 and T12 have some loss of abdominal muscle control. Disabled Sports USA defined the functional definition of this class in 2003 as, "Three trunk movements may be seen in this class:

1. ) Off the back of a chair (in an upwards direction).
2. ) Movement in the backwards and forwards plane.
3. ) Some trunk rotation. They have fair to good sitting balance. They cannot have functional hip flexors, i.e. ability to lift the thigh upwards in the sitting position. They may have stiffness of the spine that improves balance but reduces the ability to rotate the spine." People in this class have a total respiratory capacity of 87% compared to people without a disability.

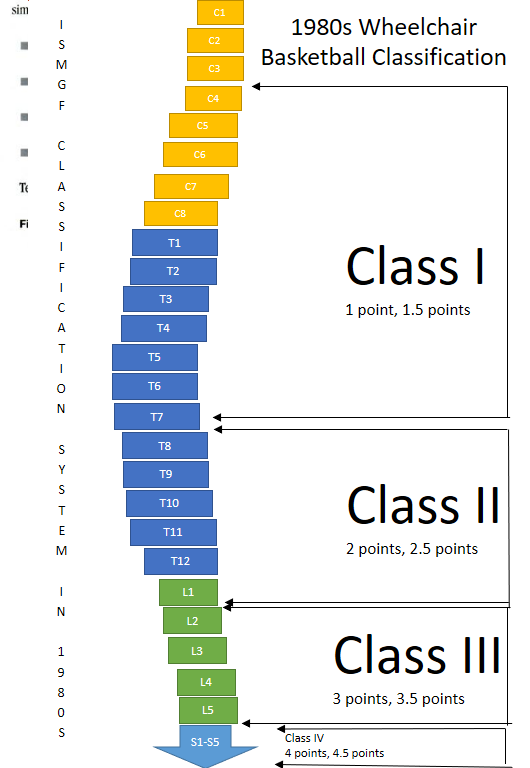
The wheelchair basketball classification system used during the 1980s was mostly functional, but had medical lesion based elements as a guideline. A maximum of 14 points was allowed on the floor at any time.

In 1982, wheelchair basketball made the move to a functional classification system internationally. While the traditional medical system of where a spinal cord injury was located could be part of classification, it was only one advisory component. People in this class would have been Class II as 2 or 2.5 point players. Under the current classification system, people in this class would likely be a 2-point player.

== History ==
The original wheelchair basketball classification system in 1966 had 5 classes: A, B, C, D, S. Each class was worth so many points. A was worth 1, B and C were worth 2. D and S were worth 3 points. A team could have a maximum of 12 points on the floor. This system was the one in place for the 1968 Summer Paralympics. Class A was for T1-T9 complete. Class B was for T1-T9 incomplete. Class C was for T10-L2 complete. Class D was for T10-L2 incomplete. Class S was for Cauda equina paralysis. For people with spinal cord injuries, this class would have been part of Class A, Class B, Class C or Class D.

From 1969 to 1973, a classification system designed by Australian Dr. Bedwell was used. This system used some muscle testing to determine which class incomplete paraplegics should be classified in. It used a point system based on the ISMGF classification system. Class IA, IB and IC were worth 1 point. Class II for people with lesions between T1-T5 and no balance were also worth 1 point. Class III for people with lesions at T6-T10 and have fair balance were worth 1 point. Class IV was for people with lesions at T11-L3 and good trunk muscles. They were worth 2 points. Class V was for people with lesions at L4 to L5 with good leg muscles. Class IV was for people with lesions at S1-S4 with good leg muscles. Class V and IV were worth 3 points. The Daniels/Worthington muscle test was used to determine who was in class V and who was class IV. Paraplegics with 61 to 80 points on this scale were not eligible. A team could have a maximum of 11 points on the floor. The system was designed to keep out people with less severe spinal cord injuries, and had no medical basis in many cases. This class would have been III or IV.

During the 1990s, there was a ban to push tilting in wheelchair basketball. One of the major arguments against its use was that 1 and 2 point players could not execute this move. This ban occurred in 1997, despite American 2 point player Melvin Juette demonstrating that it was possible for lower point players to execute at the 1997 IWBF 5 Junior Championships in Toronto, Canada. The tilting ban was lifted in 2006.

The classification was created by the International Paralympic Committee and has roots in a 2003 attempt to address "the overall objective to support and co-ordinate the ongoing development of accurate, reliable, consistent and credible sport focused classification systems and their implementation."

In 2005 and 2006, there was an active effort by the National Wheelchair Basketball Association to try to move from a three player classification system to a four-point classification system like the one used by the International Wheelchair Basketball Federation. In a push to increase participation the sport during the 2000s, people involved with the American National Wheelchair Basketball Association have argued allowing able-bodied athletes to compete would help 1 and 2 point players because there would be a need to balance participation on the team because of the rules regarding maximum points on the floor.

For the 2016 Summer Paralympics in Rio, the International Paralympic Committee had a zero classification at the Games policy. This policy was put into place in 2014, with the goal of avoiding last minute changes in classes that would negatively impact athlete training preparations. All competitors needed to be internationally classified with their classification status confirmed prior to the Games, with exceptions to this policy being dealt with on a case-by-case basis. In case there was a need for classification or reclassification at the Games despite best efforts otherwise, wheelchair basketball classification was scheduled for September 4 to 6 at Carioca Arena 1.

== Getting classified ==
Classification generally has four phase. The first stage of classification is a health examination. For amputees in this class, this is often done on site at a sports training facility or competition. The second stage is observation in practice, the third stage is observation in competition and the last stage is assigning the sportsperson to a relevant class. Sometimes the health examination may not be done on site for amputees because the nature of the amputation could cause not physically visible alterations to the body. This is especially true for lower limb amputees as it relates to how their limbs align with their hips and the impact this has on their spine and how their skull sits on their spine. For wheelchair basketball, part of the classification process involves observing a player during practice or training. This often includes observing them go one on one against someone who is likely to be in the same class the player would be classified into. Once a player is classified, it is very hard to be classified into a different classification. Players have been known to have issues with classification because some players play down their abilities during the classification process. At the same time, as players improve at the game, movements become regular and their skill level improves. This can make it appear like their classification was incorrect.

In Australia, wheelchair basketball players and other disability athletes are generally classified after they have been assessed based on medical, visual or cognitive testing, after a demonstration of their ability to play their sport, and the classifiers watching the player during competitive play.

== Competitors ==
Australian Grant Mizens is a 2-point player. Kylie Gauci is a 2-point player for Australia's women's national team. Bo Hedges and Richard Peter are a 2.5 point players for the Canadian men's national team.
