= European Wheelchair Basketball Championship =

IWBF European Championship
- Sport: Wheelchair basketball
- Founded: 1970
- First season: 1970 (men); 1974 (women)
- Continent: IWBF Europe (Europe)

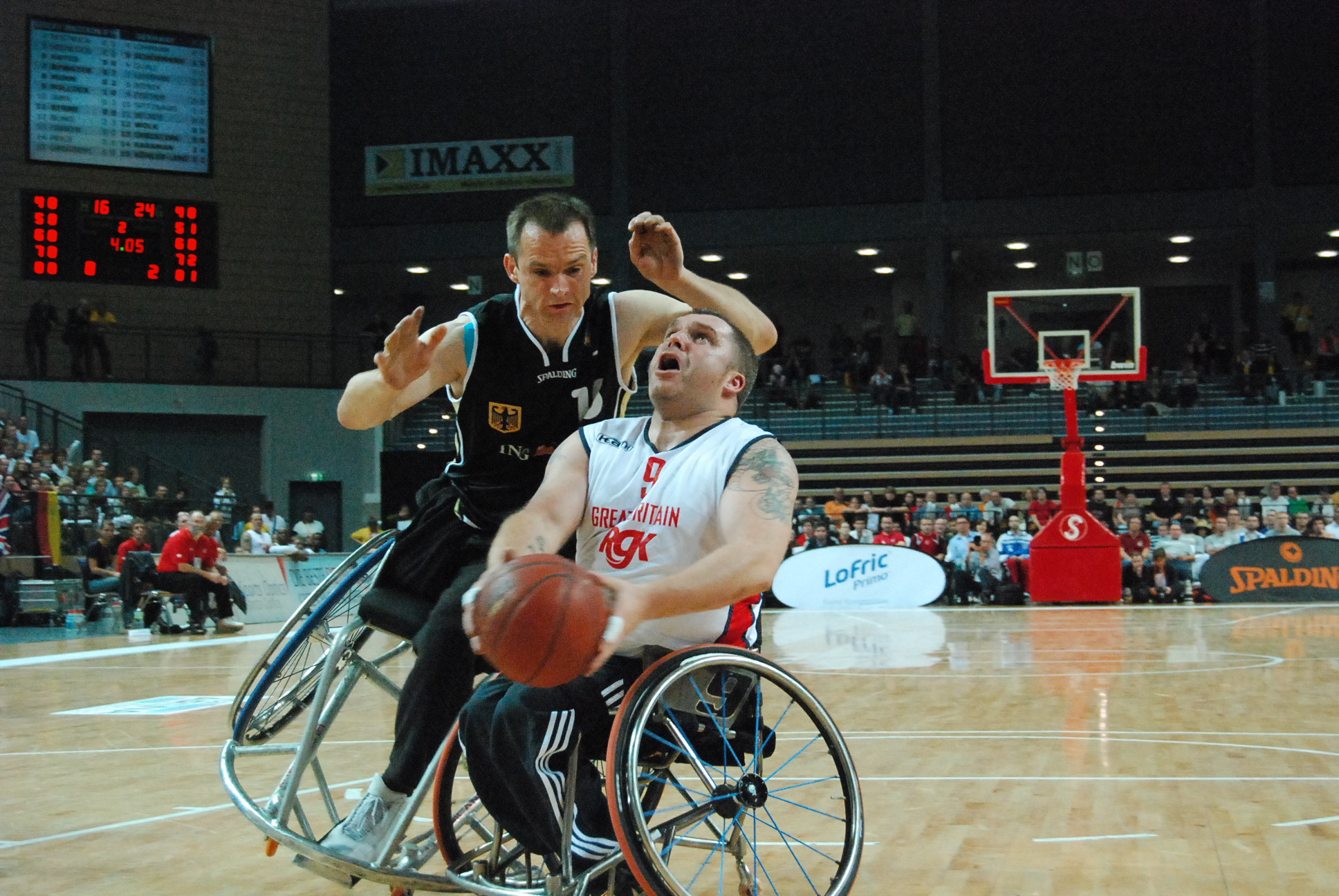
Great Britain vs. Germany, men's semifinal in 2007: Dirk Köhler-Lenz (Germany, #15) and Jon Pollock (Great Britain, #9).

The European Wheelchair Basketball Championship, is the main wheelchair basketball competition contested biennially by national teams governed by IWBF Europe, the European zone within the International Wheelchair Basketball Federation. The European Championship is also a qualifying tournament for the IWBF Wheelchair Basketball World Championships and the Paralympic Games.

== History ==
The first European Championship for men was held in 1970. The first European Championship for women was held in 1974.

== Summary ==
=== Men ===
#	Year	Host	Gold medal game			Bronze medal game		
#	Year	Host	Gold	Score	Silver	Bronze	Score	Fourth place
1	1970; Details	BEL (Bruges)	Belgium	–	France	Great Britain	–	
2	1971; Details	FRA (Kerpape)	Great Britain	–	France	Netherlands	–	
3	1974; Details	FRA (Kerpape)	Great Britain	45–40	Netherlands	France	–	
4	1977; Details	NED (Raalte)	Israel	–	Netherlands	France	–	
5	1978; Details	FRA (Kerpape)	Israel	–	France	Netherlands	–	
6	1981; Details	SUI (Geneva)	Israel	74–68	France	Netherlands	–	
7	1982; Details	SWE (Falun)	France	63–58	Israel	Sweden	–	
8	1987; Details	FRA (Lorient)	France	63–50	Netherlands	Belgium	–	
9	1989; Details	FRA (Charleville-Mezières)	France	–	Netherlands	Germany	–	
10	1991; Details	ESP (Ferrol)	France	57–50	Netherlands	Great Britain	85–59	Israel
11	1993; Details	GER (Berlin)	Netherlands	57–52	Great Britain	France	61–42	Germany
12	1995; Details	FRA (Paris)	Great Britain	55–54	Spain	Netherlands	64–45	France
13	1997; Details	ESP (Madrid)	France	46–44	Great Britain	Finland	59–53	Spain
14	1999; Details	NED (Roermond)	France	57–40	Germany	Netherlands	53–49	Great Britain
15	2001-2002; Details	NED (Amsterdam)	France	67–56	Netherlands	Germany	70–67	Great Britain
16	2003; Details	ITA (Sassari, Porto Torres)	Italy	60–47	Netherlands	Great Britain	74–64	France
17	2005; Details	FRA (Paris)	Italy	56–54	Great Britain	Sweden	54–52	Israel
18	2007; Details	GER (Wetzlar)	Sweden	76–66	Great Britain	Germany	69–56	Israel
19	2009; Details	TUR (Adana)	Italy	64–52	Turkey	Great Britain	73–65	Poland
20	2011; Details	ISR (Nazareth, Israel)	Great Britain	76-65	Germany	Spain	71–65	Poland
21	2013; Details	GER (Frankfurt)	Great Britain	59-57	Turkey	Spain	65–56	Sweden
22	2015; Details	GBR (Worcester)	Great Britain	87-66	Turkey	Germany	74-56	Netherlands
23	2017; Details	ESP (Tenerife)	Turkey	76-69	Great Britain	Germany	61-56	Netherlands
24	2019; Details	POL (Wałbrzych)	Great Britain	77-52	Spain	Turkey	76-65	Germany
25	2021; Details	ESP (Madrid)	Netherlands	20-0	Great Britain	Germany	0-0	Italy
26	2023; Details	NED (Rotterdam)	Great Britain	74-53	Spain	Netherlands	58-51	Germany
27	2025; Details	BIH (Sarajevo)	Spain	72-69	Great Britain	Germany	79-60	Italy

=== Women ===
#	Year	Host	Gold medal game			Bronze medal game		
#	Year	Host	Gold	Score	Silver	Bronze	Score	Fourth place
1	1974; Details	FRA (Kerpape)	Germany	35–20	France	Yugoslavia	–	
2	1987; Details	FRA (Lorient)	Germany	–	Israel	Netherlands	–	
3	1989; Details	FRA (Charleville-Mezières)	Netherlands	40–37	Germany	Israel	–	
4	1991; Details	ESP (Ferrol)	Germany	49–48	Netherlands	France	–	
5	1993; Details	GER (Berlin)	Netherlands	53–38	Germany	France	38–32	Israel
6	1995; Details	NED (Delden)	Netherlands	43–37	Germany	Great Britain	32–33	Israel
7	1997; Details	ESP (Madrid)	Netherlands	36–32	Germany	Great Britain	48–12	Israel
8	1999; Details	NED (Roermond)	Germany	40–37	Netherlands	Great Britain	49–28	Russia
9	2003; Details	GER (Hamburg)	Germany	65–58	Netherlands	Great Britain	48–32	France
10	2005; Details	FRA (Villeneuve d'Ascq)	Germany	66–39	Netherlands	France	41–32	Great Britain
11	2007; Details	GER (Wetzlar)	Germany	61–35	Netherlands	Great Britain	56–29	Spain
12	2009; Details	GBR (Stoke Mandeville)	Germany	82–45	Netherlands	Great Britain	53–41	France
13	2011; Details	ISR (Nazareth)	Germany	48–42	Netherlands	Great Britain	60–47	France
14	2013; Details	GER (Frankfurt)	Netherlands	57–56	Germany	Great Britain	60–39	France
15	2015; Details	GBR (Worcester)	Germany	72-62	Netherlands	Great Britain	69-39	France
16	2017; Details	ESP (Tenerife)	Netherlands	56-46	Germany	Great Britain	68-37	France
17	2019; Details	NED (Rotterdam)	Netherlands	65-52	Great Britain	Germany	53-38	Spain
18	2021; Details	ESP (Madrid)	Netherlands	20-0	Great Britain	Spain	58-40	Germany
19	2023; Details	NED (Rotterdam)	Netherlands	58-36	Great Britain	Spain	49-48	Germany
20	2025; Details	BIH (Sarajevo)	Netherlands	66-59	Great Britain	Spain	66-55	Germany

== Medals (1970-2025) ==
=== Men ===
Rank	Nation	Gold	Silver	Bronze	Total
1	Great Britain	8	7	4	19
2	France	7	4	3	14
3	Israel	3	1	0	4
4	Italy	3	0	0	3
5	Netherlands	2	7	6	15
6	Spain	1	3	2	6
7	Turkey	1	3	1	5
8	Sweden	1	0	2	3
9	Belgium	1	0	1	2
10	Germany	0	2	7	9
11	Finland	0	0	1	1
Totals (11 entries)		27	27	27	81

=== Women ===
Rank	Nation	Gold	Silver	Bronze	Total
1	Netherlands	10	8	1	19
2	Germany	10	6	1	17
3	Great Britain	0	4	10	14
4	France	0	1	3	4
5	Israel	0	1	1	2
6	Spain	0	0	3	3
7	Yugoslavia	0	0	1	1
Totals (7 entries)		20	20	20	60

=== Total ===
Rank	Nation	Gold	Silver	Bronze	Total
1	Netherlands (NED)	12	15	7	34
2	Germany (GER)	10	8	7	25
3	Great Britain (GBR)	8	11	14	33
4	France (FRA)	7	5	6	18
5	Israel (ISR)	3	2	1	6
6	Italy (ITA)	3	0	0	3
7	Spain (ESP)	1	3	5	9
8	Turkey (TUR)	1	3	1	5
9	Sweden (SWE)	1	0	2	3
10	Belgium (BEL)	1	0	1	2
11	Finland (FIN)	0	0	1	1
11	Yugoslavia (YUG)	0	0	1	1
Totals (12 entries)		47	47	46	140

== Divisions ==
=== Division B ===
==== Men's Division B ====
Year	Host	Rank		
Year	Host	1	2	3
1994; Details	Poland	Finland	Italy	Ireland
1996; Details	Slovenia	Israel	Belgium	Slovenia
1998; Details	Portugal - Switzerland	Slovenia	Switzerland	Austria
2000; Details	Spain - Czech Republic - Poland	Spain	Czech Republic	Poland
2002; Details	Czech Republic	Poland	Turkey	Slovenia
2004; Details	Switzerland	Turkey	Bosnia and Herzegovina	Russia
2006; Details	Czech Republic	Czech Republic	Turkey	Switzerland
2008; Details	Switzerland	Belgium	Bosnia and Herzegovina	Switzerland
2010; Details	Czech Republic	Netherlands	Switzerland	Bosnia and Herzegovina
2012; Details	Slovenia	France	Bosnia and Herzegovina	Switzerland
2014; Details	Czech Republic	Czech Republic	Israel	Lithuania
2016; Details	Bosnia and Herzegovina	France	Lithuania	Bosnia and Herzegovina
2018; Details	Belgium	Russia	Austria	Lithuania
2020; Details	Greece	Austria	Lithuania	Latvia
2022; Details	Bosnia and Herzegovina	Turkey	Latvia	Lithuania

==== Women's Division B ====
Year	Host	Rank		
Year	Host	1	2	3
2016; Details	Italy	Spain	Turkey	Italy
2018; Details	Italy	Turkey	Sweden	Italy

=== Division C ===
==== Men's Division C ====
Year	Host	Rank		
Year	Host	1	2	3
2003; Details	Greece	Russia	Switzerland	Greece
2005; Details	Portugal	Belgium	Croatia	Greece
2007; Details	Ireland	Portugal	Lithuania	Finland
2009; Details	Latvia	Croatia	Lithuania	Latvia
2011; Details	Lithuania	Lithuania	Ukraine	Greece
2013; Details	Austria	Austria	Latvia	Ukraine
2015; Details	Portugal	Bosnia and Herzegovina	Portugal	Finland
2017; Details	Czech Republic	Belgium	Czech Republic	Ireland
2019; Details	Bulgaria	Greece	Serbia	Portugal
2022; Details	Bosnia and Herzegovina	Serbia	Portugal	Bulgaria

==== Women's Division C ====
Up to 2022 Women's only 2 Division.

== Youth ==
=== U22 Men's ===
https://hosted.wh.geniussports.com/IWBF/en/competition/19930/schedule

https://www.the-sports.org/basketball-2021-men-s-u-22-european-wheelchair-championships-epr113767.html

https://www.the-sports.org/basketball-2018-men-s-u-22-european-wheelchair-championships-epr90674.html

=== U24 Women's ===
https://hosted.wh.geniussports.com/IWBF/en/competition/20840/schedule

== 3on3 Basketball ==
From 2021.

== Clubs ==
- European Clubs Wheelchair Basketball Championship (Mixed of Men and Women)
- Eurocup 1: IWBF Champions League - From 1975
- Eurocup 2: André Vergauwen Cup - From 1988
- Eurocup 3: Willi Brinkmann Cup - From 1997
- Eurocup 4: IWBF Challenge Cup - From 2009

=== Medals (1975-2022) ===
Rank	Nation	Gold	Silver	Bronze	Total
1	Italy	24	22	19	65
2	Germany	22	17	20	59
3	Netherlands	17	15	6	38
4	Spain	16	25	20	61
5	France	16	14	18	48
6	Turkey	10	7	8	25
7	Great Britain	8	10	9	27
8	Belgium	3	5	7	15
9	Sweden	2	0	3	5
10	Switzerland	1	0	1	2
11	Israel	0	4	5	9
12	Bosnia and Herzegovina	0	2	1	3
13	Austria	0	0	1	1
13	Russia	0	0	1	1
Totals (14 entries)		119	121	119	359

== See also ==
- Wheelchair basketball at the Summer Paralympics
- Wheelchair Basketball World Championship
- IWBF U23 World Wheelchair Basketball Championship
- 2011 Women's U25 Wheelchair Basketball World Championship
- 2015 Women's U25 Wheelchair Basketball World Championship
- 2019 Women's U25 Wheelchair Basketball World Championship
- IWBF Champions League
- André Vergauwen Cup
- Willi Brinkmann Cup
- IWBF Challenge Cup
- Kitakyushu Champions Cup
- Wheelchair basketball at the Asian Para Games
- Africa Wheelchair Basketball Championship
- Arab Wheelchair Basketball Championship
- EuroLeague
- EuroLeague Women
- EuroBasket
- EuroBasket Women
