= Germany women's national wheelchair basketball team =

National sports team

The Germany women's national wheelchair basketball team represents Germany in international women's wheelchair basketball competitions.

The team won the gold medal in the women's tournament at the 2012 Summer Paralympics held in London, United Kingdom The team won the silver medal in the women's tournament at the 2016 Summer Paralympics held in Rio de Janeiro, Brazil.

== Competition history ==
Paralympics

Year	Host	Result
1972	Heidelberg (Germany)	4th place
1976	Toronto (Canada)	Runners-up
1980	Arnhem (Netherlands)	Champions
1984	Stoke Mandeville (United Kingdom)	Champions
1988	Seoul (South Korea)	Runners-up
1992	Barcelona (Spain)	5th place
1996	Atlanta (United States)	7th place
2000	Sydney (Australia)	7th place
2004	Athens (Greece)	4th place
2004	Beijing (China)	2nd place
2012	London (United Kingdom)	Champions
2016	Rio de Janeiro (Brazil)	Runners-up
2020	Tokyo (Japan)	4th place

World Championships

Year	Host	Result
1990	Saint-Étienne (France)	2nd place
1994	Stoke Mandeville (United Kingdom)	5th place
1998	Sydney (Australia)	5th place
2002	Kitakyushu (Japan)	7th place
2006	Amsterdam (Netherlands)	3rd place
2010	Birmingham (United Kingdom)	2nd place
2014	Toronto (Canada)	2nd place
2018	Hamburg (Germany)	3rd place
2022	Dubai (United Arab Emirates)	8th place
