= Great Britain women's national wheelchair basketball team =

Great Britain
- IWBF zone: Europe
- National federation: Great Britain Wheelchair Basketball Association

The Great Britain women's national wheelchair basketball team is the women's wheelchair basketball team that represents Great Britain in international competitions. It is governed by the Great Britain Wheelchair Basketball Association.

== History ==
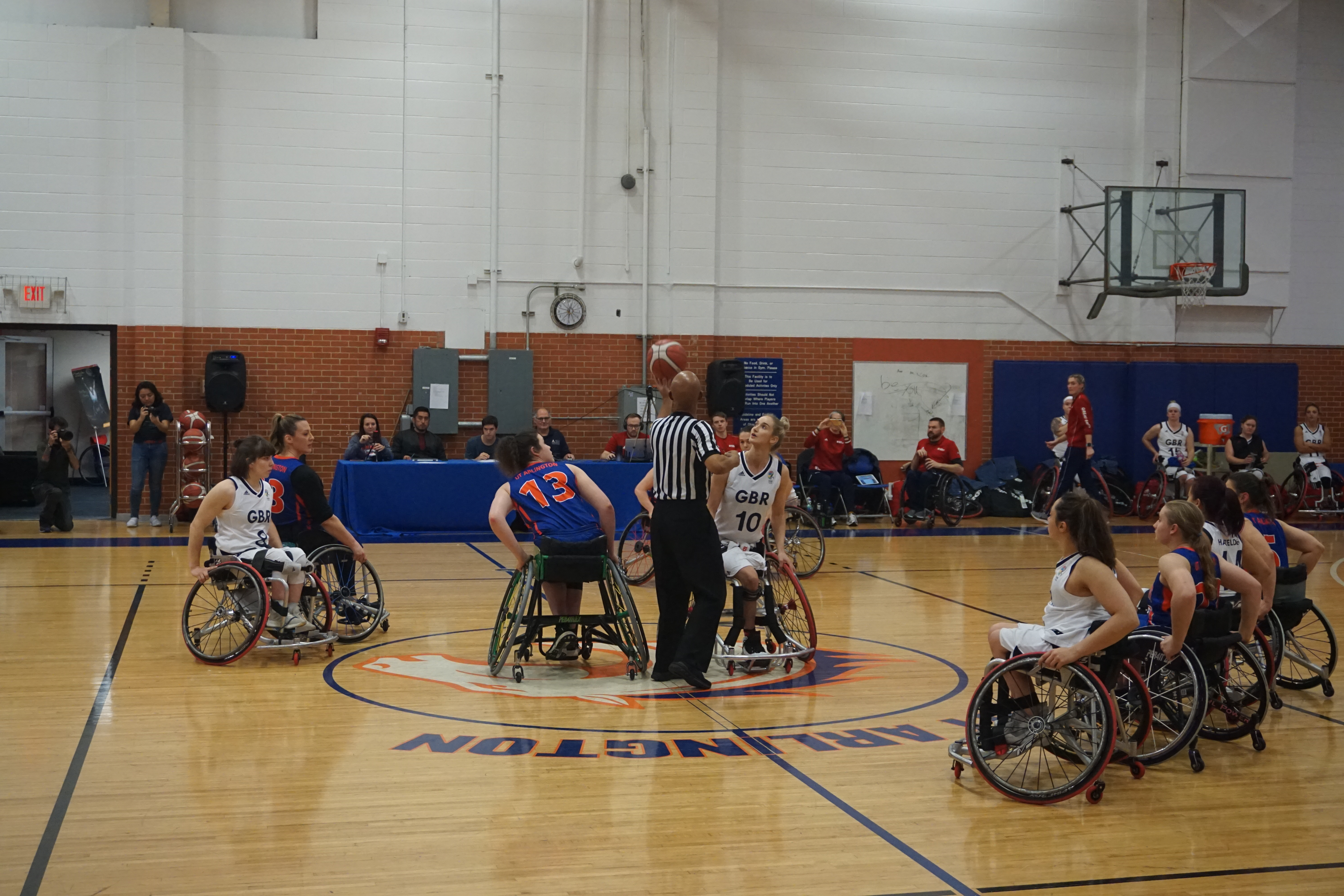
Great Britain vs. the University of Texas at Arlington Lady Movin' Mavs

In 2018, Great Britain won silver at the 2018 World Championships in Hamburg.

At the 2019 Women’s Wheelchair Basketball European Championships in Rotterdam, Great Britain secured qualification to the 2020 Summer Paralympics in Tokyo. Going into the tournament, Great Britain were the reigning Worlds silver medalists as well as the third-place team in six consecutive European Championships. Great Britain lost 65-52 to the Netherlands in a rematch of the 2018 World Championships gold medal game.

== Roster ==
The following is the Great Britain roster in the women's wheelchair basketball tournament of the 2016 Summer Paralympics.

Great Britain women's national wheelchair basketball team – 2016 Summer Paralympics roster
Players
Coaches

Pos.	No.	Name	Age – Date of birth	Pts.
G	4	Charlotte Moore	17 – 13 September 1998
G	5	Sophie Carrigill	22 – 19 January 1994
G	6	Clare Griffiths	36 – 18 September 1979
G	7	Helen Freeman	26 – 23 November 1989
G	8	Laurie Williams	24 – 4 February 1992
F	9	Judith Hamer	25 – 3 December 1990
F	10	Amy Conroy	23 – 22 October 1992
F	11	Katie Morrow	16 – 20 September 1999
G	12	Leah Evans	19 – 5 March 1997
F	13	Jordanna Bartlett	21 – 15 December 1994
G	14	Joy Haizelden	25 – 6 December 1990
G	15	Robyn Love	26 – 28 August 1990

Head coach

- (United States) Miles Thompson

Assistant coach(es)

- (United States) Dan Price

Legend

- Club – describes last club before the tournament
- Age – describes age on 10 September 2016

== See also ==
- Great Britain men's national wheelchair basketball team
- Great Britain women's national basketball team
