= 2011 Women's U25 Wheelchair Basketball World Championship =

2011 Women's U25 World Wheelchair Basketball World Championship
- Venue: Brock University
- Location: St. Catharines, Ontario, Canada
- Start date: 15 July 2011
- End date: 21 July 2011
- Competitors: 8 teams from 8 nations

The 2011 Women's U25 Wheelchair Basketball World Championship was held at the Walker Complex at Brock University in St. Catharines, Ontario, Canada, from 15 to 21 July 2011. It was the first ever wheelchair basketball world championship for women in the under-25 age category. The event was run by Wheelchair Basketball Canada in partnership with Brock University. Eight nations competed: Australia, Canada, Germany, Great Britain, Japan, Mexico, South Africa and the United States. The event took the form of a round-robin tournament, with each team playing all the other teams once. The top eight teams then went into quarter-finals, while the bottom two played each other for world ranking. The winners of the semi-finals faced each other in the final, while the losers played for bronze. The championship was won by the United States; Australia came second and Great Britain third.

== Competition ==
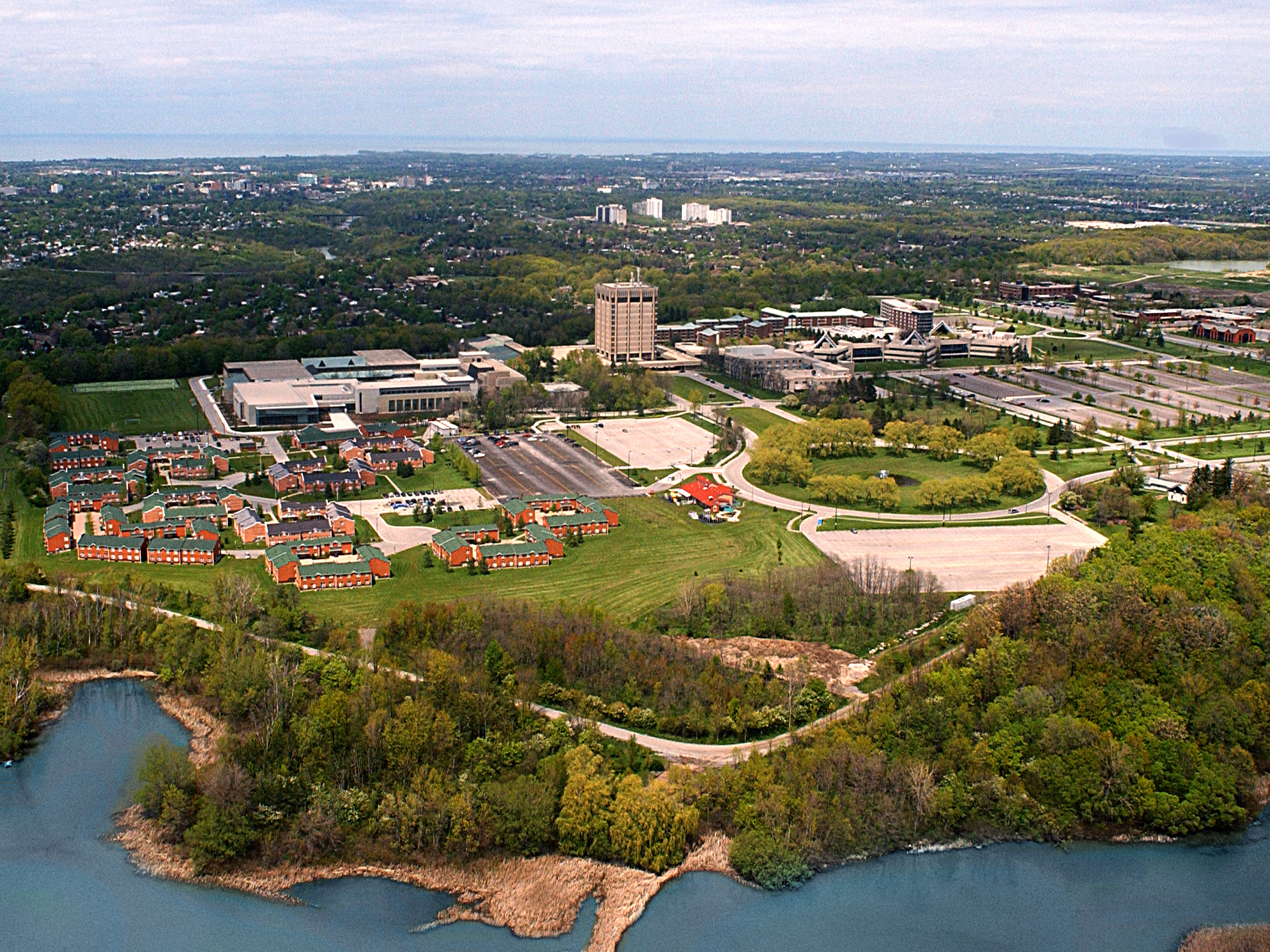
Bird's-eye view of the Brock University campus

The 2011 Women's U25 Wheelchair Basketball World Championship as the first ever wheelchair basketball world championship for women in the under-25 age category. The event was run by Wheelchair Basketball Canada in partnership with Brock University on behalf of the International Wheelchair Basketball Federation. (IWBF) Wheelchair Basketball Canada is a non-profit, charitable organization that is the national governing body of the sport in Canada, and the Canadian member of the IWBF. The event organisers hoped to raise the profile of the sport in Canada, and boost Canada's (ultimately successful) bid for the 2014 Women's World Wheelchair Basketball Championship.

== Venue ==
The event was held at the Walker Complex at Brock University in St. Catharines, Ontario, Canada. Games were played at the Bob Davis Gym, normally home to the Brock Badgers Basketball, Volleyball and Wrestling teams. The gym had 12,000 square feet (1,100 m^{2}) of space and seating for 1,000 spectators. The official practice venue was the Ian D. Beddis Gym, with nearly 24,000 square feet (2,200 m^{2}) of space.

== Teams ==
Eight nations competed: Australia, Canada, Germany, Great Britain, Japan, Mexico, South Africa and the United States.

=== Australia ===
Head Coach: Gerry Hewson
Assistant Coach: Alison Mosely
Assistant Coach: Matthew Dunstan
Team Manager: Jane Kyle
Physiotherapist: Paula Peralta

| # | Name | Class. |
|---|---|---|
| 4 | Caitlin de Wit | 3.0 |
| 5 | Cobi Crispin | 4.0 |
| 6 | Bridie Kean | 4.0 |
| 7 | Amber Merritt | 4.5 |
| 8 | Natalie Hodges | 2.0 |
| 9 | Sarah Vinci | 1.0 |
| 10 | Katherine Reed | 1.0 |
| 11 | Jessica Pellow | 1.5 |
| 12 | Natalie Alexander | 2.5 |
| 13 | Ella Sabljak | 1.0 |
| 14 | Rachel Coady | 1.0 |
| 15 | Georgia Inglis | 2.5 |

Source: "Australia". Wheelchair Basketball Canada. Archived from the original on 20 July 2011.

=== Canada ===
Head coach: Michael Broughton
Assistant coach: Marni Abbott-Peter
Assistant coach: Karla Tritten
Team Manager: Kathy Ludwig
Athletic Therapist: Teresa Hussey

| # | Name | Class. |
|---|---|---|
| 4 | Ashley Baerg | 3.0 |
| 5 | Stephanie Park | 1.0 |
| 6 | Helaina Cyr | 2.5 |
| 7 | Cindy Ouellet | 3.5 |
| 8 | Maude Jacques | 2.5 |
| 9 | Abby Stubbert | 4.5 |
| 10 | Cory Harrower | 3.0 |
| 11 | Corin Metzger | 2.5 |
| 12 | Gabby Roberts-Winter | 2.0 |
| 13 | Jamey Jewells | 1.0 |
| 14 | Tamara Steeves | 1.5 |
| 15 | Alarissa Haak | 2.0 |

Source: "Canada". Wheelchair Basketball Canada. Archived from the original on 20 July 2011.

=== Germany ===
Head coach: Heidi Kirste
Coach: Holger Glinicki
Team manager: Lisa Kösling
Doctor: Juergen Vöelpel
Physiotherapist: Tim Töllner

| # | Name | Class. |
|---|---|---|
| 4 | Mareike Adermann | 4.5 |
| 5 | Laura Fürst | 2.5 |
| 6 | Helene Harnisch | 1.0 |
| 7 | Linda Dahle | 4.5 |
| 8 | Lena Ludewigt | 3.0 |
| 9 | Eva Feldbauer | 1.5 |
| 10 | Andrea Seyrl | 2.0 |
| 11 | Maya Lindholm | 2.0 |
| 12 | Annabel Breuer | 1.5 |
| 13 | Anna Gerwinat | 1.5 |
| 14 | Luca Fischer | 3.0 |

Source: "Germany". Wheelchair Basketball Canada. Archived from the original on 20 July 2011.

=== Great Britain ===
Head coach: Jennifer Browning
Assistant coach: James Fisher
Team manager: Garry Peel
Physiotherapist: Lisa Wiles

| # | Name | Class. |
|---|---|---|
| 4 | Natasha Davies | 1.0 |
| 5 | Debee Steel | 2.5 |
| 6 | Ella Beaumont | 1.0 |
| 7 | Helen Freeman | 4.0 |
| 8 | Laurie Williams | 2.5 |
| 9 | Judith Hamer | 4.5 |
| 10 | Amy Conroy | 4.0 |
| 12 | Madeleine Thompson | 4.5 |
| 13 | Eimear Macsorley | 1.5 |
| 14 | Jordanna Bartlett | 3.0 |

Source: "Great Britain". Wheelchair Basketball Canada. Archived from the original on 20 July 2011.

=== Japan ===
Head coach: Kaori Tachibana
Assistant coach:Makiko Harada
Assistant coach:Mina Hiroki
Team Manager: Miho Sugiyama
Physiotherapist: Toshihiro Wakui
General manager: Yoshikazu Noguchi

| # | Name | Class. |
|---|---|---|
| 4 | Haruka Tsuchitana | 2.5 |
| 5 | Chihiro Kitada | 4.5 |
| 6 | Yui Kitama | 1.0 |
| 7 | Moe Uchimi | 4.5 |
| 8 | Midori Ikeno | 4.5 |
| 9 | Hiroko Bamba | 3.0 |
| 10 | Mayo Hagino | 1.0 |
| 15 | Mari Amimoto | 4.5 |

Source: "Japan". Wheelchair Basketball Canada. Archived from the original on 20 July 2011.

=== Mexico ===
Head coach: Heriberto Escalona
Assistant coach: Ulises Menéndez
Manager: Sergio Durand
Team doctor: Eduardo De Garay

| # | Name | Class. |
|---|---|---|
| 5 | Isabel López | 4.5 |
| 6 | María Magos | 1.0 |
| 7 | Floralia Estrada | 4.0 |
| 8 | Anaisa Pérez | 2.5 |
| 10 | Fara Garcia | 2.0 |
| 14 | Claudia De la Torre | 1.0 |
| 15 | Orquídea Hernández | 3.5 |

Source: "Mexico". Wheelchair Basketball Canada. Archived from the original on 20 July 2011.

=== South Africa ===
Head coach: Willie Mulder
Assistant coach:Victor Andriessen
Team Manager: Yoliswa Lumka
Physiotherapist: Yamisha Nathalal

| # | Name | Class. |
|---|---|---|
| 4 | Sinayo Mukume | 1.0 |
| 5 | Mandisa Mkhungo | 1.0 |
| 6 | Dineo Mosime | 4.5 |
| 7 | Misqah Kamaldien | 2.5 |
| 8 | Katherine Swanepoel | 3.0 |
| 9 | Mathapelo Maloisane | 3.0 |
| 10 | Sylvia Somo | 3.0 |
| 11 | Alitha Madyib | 4.5 |
| 14 | Kelebogile Moeng | 4.5 |
| 15 | Carmen Huisamen | 4.5 |

Source: "South Africa". Wheelchair Basketball Canada. Archived from the original on 20 July 2011.

=== United States ===
Head coach: Stephanie Wheeler
Assistant coach: Dan Price
Assistant coach: Dan Price
Manager: Matthew Buchi
Team leader: Jessica Servais
ATC:Karla Wessels

| # | Name | Class. |
|---|---|---|
| 4 | Rebecca Murray | 2.5 |
| 5 | Desiree Miller | 3.5 |
| 6 | Rose Hollermann | 3.5 |
| 7 | Mackenzie Soldan | 1.0 |
| 8 | Kimberley Champion | 4.5 |
| 9 | Rachel Voss | 2.0 |
| 10 | Jennifer Poist | 2.0 |
| 11 | Emily Seelenfreund | 2.0 |
| 12 | Caitlin McDermott | 1.0 |
| 13 | Deanna Free | 3.0 |
| 14 | Sarah Binsfeld | 2.5 |
| 15 | Gail Gaeng | 3.5 |

Source: "United States". Wheelchair Basketball Canada. Archived from the original on 20 July 2011.

== Preliminary round ==
15 July 2011
11:00

Report

| Germany | 63–50 | Japan |
Scoring by quarter: 17–13, 5–16, 22–11, 19–10
| Pts: Adermann 32; Rebs: Adermann 21; Asts: Adermann 7 | | Pts: Amimoto 18; Rebs: Uchimi 16; Asts: Amimoto 5 |

Bob Davis Gym, Brock University

15 July 2011
13:15

Report

| Great Britain | 45–57 | Australia |
Scoring by quarter: 9–13, 4–12, 22–20, 10–12
| Pts: Freeman, Conroy 16; Rebs: Conroy 8 Asts: Freeman 6 | | Pts: Crispin 21; Rebs: Merritt 8 Asts: Kean 8 |

Bob Davis Gym, Brock University

15 July 2011
16:45

Report

| United States | 61–36 | Mexico |
Scoring by quarter: 18–11, 14–6, 18–11, 11–8
| Pts: Murray, Miller 16; Rebs: Murray, Miller 9 Asts: Murray, Seelenfreund 3 | | Pts: Estrada 19; Rebs: Lopez 11; Asts: Prez, Delatorre 1 |

Bob Davis Gym, Brock University

15 July 2011
19:00

Report

| Canada | 62–15 | South Africa |
Scoring by quarter: 18–5, 14–4, 15–2, 15–4
| Pts: Stubbert 19; Rebs: Ouellet 16; Asts: Ouellet 10 | | Pts: Moeng 8 Rebs: Moeng 9 |

Bob Davis Gym, Brock University

16 July 2011
10:00

Report

| Mexico | 51–65 | Great Britain |
Scoring by quarter: 15–15, 14–12, 11–16, 11–22
| Pts: Perez 26; Rebs: Lopez 20; Asts: Perez 5 | | Pts: Freeman 30; Rebs: Freeman 10; Asts: Freeman 13 |

Bob Davis Gym, Brock University

16 July 2011
12:15

Report

| South Africa | 24–43 | Germany |
Scoring by quarter: 4–19, 8–7, 8–11, 4–6
| 'Pts: Somo 8 Rebs: three players 5 Asts: Somo 2 | | Pts: Adermann 15; Rebs: Adermann 20; Asts: Fuerst 4 |

Bob Davis Gym, Brock University

16 July 2011
14:45

Report

| Australia | 51–77 | United States |
Scoring by quarter: 12–18, 11–17, 13–19, 15–16
| Pts: Crispin 21; Rebs: Crispin 7 Asts: Crispin 4 | | Pts: Murray 21; Rebs: Hollermann 8 Asts: Murray 10 |

Bob Davis Gym, Brock University

16 July 2011
17:00

Report

| Japan | 52–65 | Canada |
Scoring by quarter: 8–14, 16–17, 16–20, 12–14
| Pts: Amimoto 20; Rebs: Uchimi 13; Asts: Amimoto 5 | | Pts: Ouellet 25; Rebs: Stubbert 11; Asts: Stubbert 8 |

Bob Davis Gym, Brock University

17 July 2011
11:00

Report

| Mexico | 47–56 | Australia |
Scoring by quarter: 7–2, 17–19, 7–18, 16–17
| Pts: Estrada 27; Rebs: Estrada 11; Asts: Perez 6 | | Pts: Crispin 21; Rebs: Crispin 7 Asts: Crispin, Kean 4 |

Bob Davis Gym, Brock University

17 July 2011
13:15

Report

| Germany | 47–60 | Canada |
Scoring by quarter: 6–16, 13–23, 19–11, 9–10
| Pts: Adermann 21; Rebs: Adermann 14; Asts: Adermann 10 | | Pts: Ouellet 23; Rebs: Ouellet 11; Asts: Ouellet 8 |

Bob Davis Gym, Brock University

17 July 2011
16:45

Report

| South Africa | 17–53 | Japan |
Scoring by quarter: 4–22, 9–12, 4–8, 0–11
| Pts: Madyibi 11; Rebs: Huisamen 13; Asts: Kamaldien 4 | | Pts: Amimoto 21; Rebs: Amimoto 16; Asts: Amimoto 8 |

Bob Davis Gym, Brock University

17 July 2011
19:00

Report

| United States | 65–35 | Great Britain |
Scoring by quarter: 23–11, 12–13, 18–4, 12–7
| Pts: Murray 21; Rebs: Miller 12; Asts: Murray 9 | | Pts: Freeman, Conroy 8 Rebs: Amy Conroy 8 Asts: Freeman, Williams 3 |

Bob Davis Gym, Brock University

== Playoff round ==
Quarter-finals
19 July
United States | 73
South Africa | 12
19 July
Germany | 38
Great Britain | 56
19 July
Canada | 63
Mexico | 48
19 July
Australia | 56
Japan | 53

Semi-finals
20 July
United States | 63
Great Britain | 48
20 July
Canada | 47
Australia | 60

Gold medal
21 July
United States | 66
Australia | 39
Bronze medal
21 July
Canada | 42
Great Britain | 62

Quarter-Final 1

19 July 2011
11:00

Report

| Germany | 38–56 | Great Britain |
Scoring by quarter: 13–13, 10–10, 9–15, 6–18
| Pts: Adermann 16; Rebs: Adermann 13; Asts: Lindholm 8 | | Pts: Freeman 22; Rebs: Freeman 12; Asts: Williams 5 |

Bob Davis Gym, Brock University

Quarter-Final 2

19 July 2011
13:15

Report

| Australia | 56–53 | Japan |
Scoring by quarter: 14–6, 11–16, 18–18, 13–13
| Pts: Crispin 21; Rebs: Crispin 11; Asts: Kean 4 | | Pts: Amimoto 29; Rebs: Uchimi, Amimoto 12; Asts: Amimoto 6 |

Bob Davis Gym, Brock University

Quarter-Final 3

19 July 2011
16:45

Report

| United States | 72–12 | South Africa |
Scoring by quarter: 18–0, 14–0, 18–10, 11–2
| Pts: Soldan 14; Rebs: McDermott 12; Asts: Voss, Seelenfreund 5 | | Pts: Madyibi 6 Rebs: Kamaldien 5 Asts: Somo 3 |

Bob Davis Gym, Brock University

Quarter-Final 4

19 July 2011
19:00

Report

| Canada | 63–48 | Mexico |
Scoring by quarter: 20–56, 12–16, 16–13, 15–13
| Pts: Ouellet 24; Rebs: Ouellet 13; Asts: Ouellet 7 | | Pts: Estrada 24; Rebs: Estrada 15; Asts: Perez 10 |

Bob Davis Gym, Brock University

5/8 Crossover 1

20 July 2011
11:00

Report

| Germany | 52–30 | South Africa |
Scoring by quarter: 15–5, 9–8, 10–13, 18–4
| Pts: Fuerst 13; Rebs: Fuerst 10; Asts: Lindholm 3 | | Pts: Meliosane 9 Rebs: Madyibi 7 Asts: Somo 5 |

Bob Davis Gym, Brock University

5/8 Crossover 2

20 July 2011
13:15

Report

| Japan | 65–52 | Mexico |
Scoring by quarter: 19–16, 16–11, 16–5, 14–20
| Pts: Amimoto 51; Rebs: Uchimi 15; Asts: Uchimi 4 | | Pts: Estrada 26; Rebs: Estrada 14; Asts: Perez 4 |

Bob Davis Gym, Brock University

Semi-Final 1

20 July 2011
16:45

Report

| United States | 63–48 | Great Britain |
Scoring by quarter: 16–10, 11–10, 18–19, 18–9
| Pts: Miller 23; Rebs: Murray, Miller 10; Asts: Murray 6 | | Pts: Freeman 26; Rebs: Freeman 12; Asts: Freeman 7 |

Bob Davis Gym, Brock University

Semi-Final 2

19 July 2011
19:00

Report

| Canada | 47–60 | Australia |
Scoring by quarter: 12–7, 9–20, 9–14, 17–19
| Pts: Ouellet, Stubbert 14; Rebs: Ouellet 20; Asts: Stubbert 4 | | Pts: Merritt 25; Rebs: Merritt 11; Asts: Kean 5 |

Bob Davis Gym, Brock University

== Championship round ==
7th/8th place game

21 July 2011
11:00

Official statistics sheet, Game No. 12

| Mexico | 55–33 | South Africa |
Scoring by quarter: 24←5, 5–5, 10–9, 16–9
| Pts: Estrada 25; Rebs: Lopez 14; Asts: Hernández 6 | | Pts: Madyibi 15; Rebs: Moeng 9 Asts: Somo 6 |

Bob Davis Gym, Brock University

5th/6th place game

21 July 2011
13:15

Official statistics sheet, Game No. 11

| Germany | 51–53 | Japan |
Scoring by quarter: 9–8, 18–8, 12–13, 12–17
| Pts: Adermann 29; Rebs: Adermann 17; Asts: Adermann 5 | | Pts: Amimoto 27; Rebs: Uchimi 17; Asts: Amimoto 6 |

Bob Davis Gym, Brock University

Bronze medal match

21 July 2011
16:45

Report, Official statistics sheet, Game No. 10

| Canada | 42–62 | Great Britain |
Scoring by quarter: 10–14, 8–12, 14–14, 10–22
| Pts: Ouellet 16; Rebs: Stubbert 10; Asts: Ouellet, Stubbert 4 | | Pts: Freeman 28; Rebs: Freeman 16; Asts: Freeman 9 |

Bob Davis Gym, Brock University

Gold medal match

21 July 2011
19:00

Report

| United States | 66–39 | Australia |
Scoring by quarter: 17–10, 21–6, 20–10, 8–13
| Pts: Miller 26; Rebs: Miller 6 Asts: Murray 6 | | Pts: Kean 15; Rebs: Kean, Crispin 7 Asts: Crispin 3 |

Bob Davis Gym, Brock University

== MVP and All Stars ==
Awards were presented on the final day:

=== All Star Five ===
- Jamey Jewells (1.0) (Canada)
- Rebecca Murray (2.5) (United States)
- Cindy Ouellet (3.5) (Canada)
- Mari Amimoto (4.5) (Japan)
- Maya Lindholm (2.0) (Germany)

=== Most Valuable Player ===
- Desiree Miller (3.5) (United States)

== True sports ==
Each team was asked to nominate an individual from their team who exemplified the principles of true sport. The nominees were:

- Carmen Huisamen (4.5) (South Africa)
- Mareike Adermann (4.5) (Germany)
- Chihiro Kitada (4.5) (Japan)
- Floralia Estrada (4.0) (Mexico)
- Alarissa Haak (2.0) (Canada)
- Ella Sabljak (1.0) (Australia)
- Gail Gaeng (3.5) (United States)
