= Wheelchair basketball at the 2016 Summer Paralympics – Women's tournament =

Wheelchair basketball at the XV Paralympic Games
- Venue: Carioca Arena 1 Rio Olympic Arena
- Dates: 8 – 17 September 2016
- Competitors: 120

The women's tournament in wheelchair basketball at the 2016 Summer Paralympics was held between 8–16 September.

== Competition schedule ==
G	Group stage	¼	Quarter-finals	½	Semi-finals	B	Bronze medal match	GM	Gold medal match

Date Event	Thu 8 Sep	Fri 9 Sep	Sat 10 Sep	Sun 11 Sep	Mon 12 Sep	Tue 13 Sep	Wed 14 Sep	Thu 15 Sep	Fri 16 Sep	
Women	G	G	G	G	G	1/4		1/2	B	GM

== Group stage ==
=== Group A ===
Pos	Team	Pld	W	L	PF	PA	PD	Pts	Qualification
1	Germany	4	3	1	248	156	+92	7 (Note: Head-to-head record: Germany 3 pts, +9 PD; Great Britain 3 pts, −2 PD; Canada 3 pts, −7 PD)	Quarter-finals
2	Great Britain	4	3	1	228	140	+88	7	Quarter-finals
3	Canada	4	3	1	252	181	+71	7	Quarter-finals
4	Brazil (H)	4	1	3	196	241	−45	5	Quarter-finals
5	Argentina	4	0	4	87	296	−209	4	9th/10th place playoff

Source: Paralympic.org
Rules for classification: 1) Points; 2) Head-to-head results; 3) Points difference; 4) Points scored.
(H) Hosts
Notes:

8 September 2016
09:30

Report

Great Britain	36–43	Canada
Scoring by quarter: 12–14, 12–11, 8–10, 4–8
Pts: Freeman, Conroy 14; Rebs: Freeman 15; Asts: Freeman 5		Pts: McLachlan 21; Rebs: McLachlan 22; Asts: Ouellet 6

Rio Olympic Arena, Rio de Janeiro
Referees: Celine Villard

8 September 2016
12:15

Report

Brazil	85–19	Argentina
Scoring by quarter: 22–4, 18–4, 23–5, 22–6
Pts: Almeida 31; Rebs: Almeida 7 Asts: Santana 6		Pts: Pallares 7 Rebs: Pallares 7 Asts: Perez 2

Carioca Arena 1, Rio de Janeiro
Referees: Matt Wells

9 September 2016
10:00

Report

Argentina	20–79	Great Britain
Scoring by quarter: 2–20, 4–14, 3–21, 11–24
Pts: Pallares 11; Rebs: Pallares 16; Asts: Capdeville 3		Pts: Morrow 16; Rebs: Love 9 Asts: Haizeldon 5

Carioca Arena 1, Rio de Janeiro
Referees: Philip Haines

9 September 2016
15:15

Report

Germany	77–32	Brazil
Scoring by quarter: 23–2, 22–11, 18–8, 14–11
Pts: Mohnen 21; Rebs: Mohnen, Miller 7 Asts: Mohnen, Zeyen 7		Pts: Almeida 7 Rebs: Almeida, Assuncao 4 Asts: Assuncao, Costa, Martins, Almeida 1

Rio Olympic Arena, Rio de Janeiro
Referees: Tomas Pajer

10 September 2016
9:30

Report

Canada	73–28	Argentina
Scoring by quarter: 24–4, 10–6, 19–8, 20–10
Pts: Young 14; Rebs: Ouellet 6 Asts: Lalonde 6		Pts: Pallares 8 Rebs: Pallares 7 Asts: Olmedo 6

Carioca Arena 1, Rio de Janeiro
Referees: Bill Kuerzi

10 September 2016
11:45

Report

Great Britain	50–45	Germany
Scoring by quarter: 14–17, 10–7, 12–4, 14–17
Pts: Freeman, Conroy 14; Rebs: Freeman 9 Asts: Freeman 9		Pts: Mohnen 17; Rebs: Miller, Zeyen, Mohnen 6 Asts: Welin, Zeyen, Schunemann, Mohnen 3

Rio Olympic Arena, Rio de Janeiro
Referees: Juan Uruneula

11 September 2016
10:00

Report

Germany	68–54	Canada
Scoring by quarter: 20–14, 9–17, 16–11, 23–12
Pts: Mohnen 23; Rebs: Breuer 8 Asts: Mohnen 9		Pts: Cindy Ouellet 23; Rebs: Cindy Ouellet 6 Asts: McLachan, Harnock 5

Carioca Arena 1, Rio de Janeiro
Referees: Adam Froczak

11 September 2016
21:30

Report

Brazil	32–63	Great Britain
Scoring by quarter: 8–15, 6–16, 6–22, 12–10
Pts: Assuncao, Martins 8 Rebs: Viera, Martins 4 Asts: Assuncao 4		Pts: Conroy 15; Rebs: Freeman 15; Asts: Freeman 10

Carioca Arena 1, Rio de Janeiro
Referees: Matt Wells

12 September 2016
9:00

Report

Argentina	20–59	Germany
Scoring by quarter: 6–21, 2–11, 12–17, 0–10
Pts: Pallares 8 Rebs: Pallares 10; Asts: Pallares 2		Pts: Schunemann 20; Rebs: Schunemann 18; Asts: Schunemann, Gross 5

Carioca Arena 1, Rio de Janeiro
Referees: Celine Villard

12 September 2016
11:45

Report

Canada	82–49	Brazil
Scoring by quarter: 24–12, 25–10, 19–12, 14–15
Pts: Young 22; Rebs: McLachlan 10; Asts: Ouellet 12		Pts: Almeida 12; Rebs: Almeida 8 Asts: Almeida 6

Rio Olympic Arena, Rio de Janeiro
Referees: Jae Geun Lee

=== Group B ===
Pos	Team	Pld	W	L	PF	PA	PD	Pts	Qualification
1	United States	4	4	0	288	138	+150	8	Quarter-finals
2	Netherlands	4	3	1	300	148	+152	7	Quarter-finals
3	China	4	2	2	212	187	+25	6	Quarter-finals
4	France	4	1	3	178	266	−88	5	Quarter-finals
5	Algeria	4	0	4	93	332	−239	4	9th/10th place playoff

Source: Paralympic.org
Rules for classification: 1) Points; 2) Head-to-head results; 3) Points difference; 4) Points scored.

8 September 2016
10:00

Report

France	37–93	United States
Scoring by quarter: 11–25, 10–18, 10–29, 6–21
Pts: Menard 9 Rebs: Saint Omer-Delepine 8		Pts: Murray 36; Rebs: Hollermann 9 Asts: Schwab 14

Carioca Arena 1, Rio de Janeiro
Referees: Gustavo Mathias

8 September 2016
21:00

Report

Algeria	16–88	China
Scoring by quarter: 6–23, 0–18, 2–30, 8–17
Pts: Khemgani 6 Rebs: Khemgani 8		Pts: Lyu 19; Rebs: Lei 8 Asts: Long, Deng 7

Rio Olympic Arena, Rio de Janeiro
Referees: Nurredin Bilmez

9 September 2016
17:30

Report

Netherlands	107–29	Algeria
Scoring by quarter: 34–10, 27–2, 24–8, 22–9
Pts: Beijer 20; Rebs: van Leeuwen 10; Asts: Huitzing 12		Pts: Khemcani 9 Rebs: Khemcani 6 Asts: Khemcani 3

Rio Olympic Arena, Rio de Janeiro
Referees: Karen Molina

9 September 2016
21:30

Report

China	59–39	France
Scoring by quarter: 16–4, 11–14, 18–13, 14–8
Pts: Dai 25; Rebs: Dai 10; Asts: Dai, Long 6		Pts: Buso 14; Rebs: Saint Omer Delepine 8 Asts: Buso 3

Carioca Arena 1, Rio de Janeiro
Referees: Max Kindervater

10 September 2016
12:15

Report

France	30–81	Netherlands
Scoring by quarter: 6–24, 4–16, 6–24, 14–17
Pts: Saint Omer Delepine 8 Rebs: Saint Omer Delepine 5 Asts: Pichon, Watine 3		Pts: Beijer 16; Rebs: Korver 9 Asts: Huitzing 6

Carioca Arena 1, Rio de Janeiro
Referees: Carsten Rehling

10 September 2016
18:00

Report

United States	70–36	China
Scoring by quarter: 21–8, 18–12, 20–6, 11–10
Pts: Miller, Murray 24; Rebs: Murray 12; Asts: Murray 6		Pts: Lyu, Dai 14; Rebs: Lyu 9 Asts: Long 6

Carioca Arena 1, Rio de Janeiro
Referees: Mati Quintana

11 September 2016
15:45

Report

Netherlands	50–60	United States
Scoring by quarter: 9–18, 12–13, 13–10, 16–19
Pts: Beijer 30; Rebs: Beijer 12; Asts: Huitzing 8		Pts: Hollermann 17; Rebs: Hollermann 17; Asts: Murray 7

Carioca Arena 1, Rio de Janeiro
Referees: Krunoslav Peic

11 September 2016
17:30

Report

Algeria	33–72	France
Scoring by quarter: 5–23, 8–22, 8–18, 12–9
Pts: Khemgani 12; Rebs: Khemgani 6 Asts: hemgani 5		Pts: Saint Omer Delepine 20; Rebs: Saint Omer Delepine 7 Asts: Etavard Glemp 9

Rio Olympic Arena, Rio de Janeiro
Referees: Milutin Jelenic

12 September 2016
09:30

Report

United States	65–15	Algeria
Scoring by quarter: 19–4, 12–4, 20–2, 14–5
Pts: Schneider 14; Rebs: Dunkin 10; Asts: Dunkin 6		Pts: Khemgani 8 Rebs: Khemgani 8 Asts: Abdelali 1

Rio Olympic Arena, Rio de Janeiro
Referees: Mati Quintana

12 September 2016
11:15

Report

China	29–62	Netherlands
Scoring by quarter: 13–14, 3–17, 3–15, 10–16
Pts: Lei, Lin 6 Rebs: Chen, Lyu 5 Asts: Long, Lin 4		Pts: Huitzing 22; Rebs: Beijer 8 Asts: Korver 4

Carioca Arena 1, Rio de Janeiro
Referees: Juan Uruneula

== Knockout stage ==
Quarter-finals
13 September
Germany	76
France	28
13 September
Netherlands	78
Canada	60
13 September
Great Britain	57
China	38
13 September
United States	66
Brazil	35

Semi-finals
15 September
Germany	55
Netherlands	45
15 September
Great Britain	78
United States	89

Gold medal
16 September
Germany	45
United States	62
Bronze medal
16 September
Netherlands	76
Great Britain	34

=== Classification playoffs ===
==== 9th/10th place playoff ====
13 September 2016
09:30

Report

Algeria	38–53	Argentina
Scoring by quarter: 10–14, 6–16, 8–14, 14–9
Pts: Foulani 12; Rebs: Zairi 6 Asts: Abdelau 7		Pts: Coronel 20; Rebs: Linari 11; Asts: Olmedo 8

Rio Olympic Arena, Rio de Janeiro
Referees: Jaime Oseguera

==== 7th/8th place playoff ====
16 September 2016
9:30

Report

France	39–57	Brazil
Scoring by quarter: 12–8, 4–16, 12–12, 11–21
Pts: Saint Omer-Delepine 10; Rebs: Saint Omer-Delepine 11; Asts: Buso 7		Pts: Almeida 17; Rebs: Martins 10; Asts: Santana 8

Rio Olympic Arena, Rio de Janeiro
Referees: Matt Wells

==== 5th/6th place playoff ====
16 September 2016
15:15

Report

Canada	63–52	China
Scoring by quarter: 17–12, 9–8, 14–19, 23–13
Pts: Ouellet 20; Rebs: McLachlan 25; Asts: McLachlan 8		Pts: Lei, Dai 17; Rebs: Deng 4 Asts: Long 6

Rio Olympic Arena, Rio de Janeiro
Referees: Gustavo Mathias

=== Quarter-finals ===
13 September 2016
11:45

Report

Netherlands	78–60	Canada
Scoring by quarter: 19–18, 23–11, 18–20, 18–11
Pts: Beijer 31; Rebs: Beijer 14; Asts: Huitzing 7		Pts: Ouellet 20; Rebs: McLachlan 11; Asts: Ouellet, McLachlan 5

Rio Olympic Arena, Rio de Janeiro
Referees: Gustavo Mathias

13 September 2016
15:15

Report

Germany	76–28	France
Scoring by quarter: 14–5, 20–11, 16–3, 26–9
Pts: Miller 22; Rebs: Schunemann 14; Asts: Schunemann 14		Pts: Etavard-Glemp 8 Rebs: Menard 7 Asts: Etavard-Glemp 2

Rio Olympic Arena, Rio de Janeiro
Referees: Bill Kuerzi

13 September 2016
17:30

Report

Great Britain	57–38	China
Scoring by quarter: 18–12, 17–7, 14–7, 8–12
Pts: Freeman 24; Rebs: Conroy 12; Asts: Freeman 11		Pts: Lei 13; Rebs: Lyu 7 Asts: Long 11

Rio Olympic Arena, Rio de Janeiro
Referees: Sebastien Gauthier

13 September 2016
21:00

Report

United States	66–35	Brazil
Scoring by quarter: 21–4, 14–9, 11–10, 20–12
Pts: Hollermann 28; Rebs: Murray, Gaeng 11; Asts: Murray 6		Pts: Martins 11; Rebs: Martins 9 Asts: Martins 7

Rio Olympic Arena, Rio de Janeiro
Referees: Max Kindervater

=== Semi-finals ===
15 September 2016
11:15

Report

Great Britain	78–89	United States
Scoring by quarter: 18–18, 18–23, 13–26, 29–22
Pts: Freeman 29; Rebs: Freeman 6 Asts: Freeman 18		Pts: Miller 26; Rebs: Gaeng, Hollermann 7 Asts: Miller 14

Rio Olympic Arena, Rio de Janeiro
Referees: Matt Wells

15 September 2016
15:15

Report

Germany	55–45	Netherlands
Scoring by quarter: 14–4, 11–8, 7–15, 23–18
Pts: Miller 25; Rebs: Miller, Mohnen 12; Asts: Mohnen 7		Pts: Visser 10; Rebs: Beijer 13; Asts: Huitzing 4

Rio Olympic Arena, Rio de Janeiro
Referees: Juan Urunuela

=== Bronze medal match ===
16 September 2016
11:45

Report

Netherlands	76–34	Great Britain
Scoring by quarter: 17–4, 16–13, 19–11, 24–6
Pts: Beijer 21; Rebs: Beijer 6 Asts: Huitzing 7		Pts: Freeman 7 Rebs: Conroy 5 Asts: Freeman 7

Rio Olympic Arena, Rio de Janeiro
Referees: Carsten Rehling

=== Gold medal match ===
16 September 2016
17:30

Report

Germany	45–62	United States
Scoring by quarter: 12–14, 5–15, 12–20, 16–13
Pts: Schunemann 13; Rebs: Miller 9 Asts: Schunemann 6		Pts: Murray 33; Rebs: Hollermann 12; Asts: Hollermann 8

Rio Olympic Arena, Rio de Janeiro
Referees: Juan Urunuela

== Ranking ==
Place	Team
1st place, gold medalist(s)	United States
2nd place, silver medalist(s)	Germany
3rd place, bronze medalist(s)	Netherlands
4.	Great Britain
5.	Canada
6.	China
7.	Brazil
8.	France
9.	Argentina
10.	Algeria

== See also ==
- Wheelchair basketball at the 2016 Summer Paralympics – Men
