= Baerg =

Surname list

Baerg is a surname. Notable people with the surname include:

- Ashley Baerg (born 1989), Canadian Paralympic wheelchair basketball player
- Cameron Baerg (born 1972), Canadian rower
- Jason Baerg (born 1970), visual artist, media producer, and educator
