= Laura Fürst =

German wheelchair basketball player

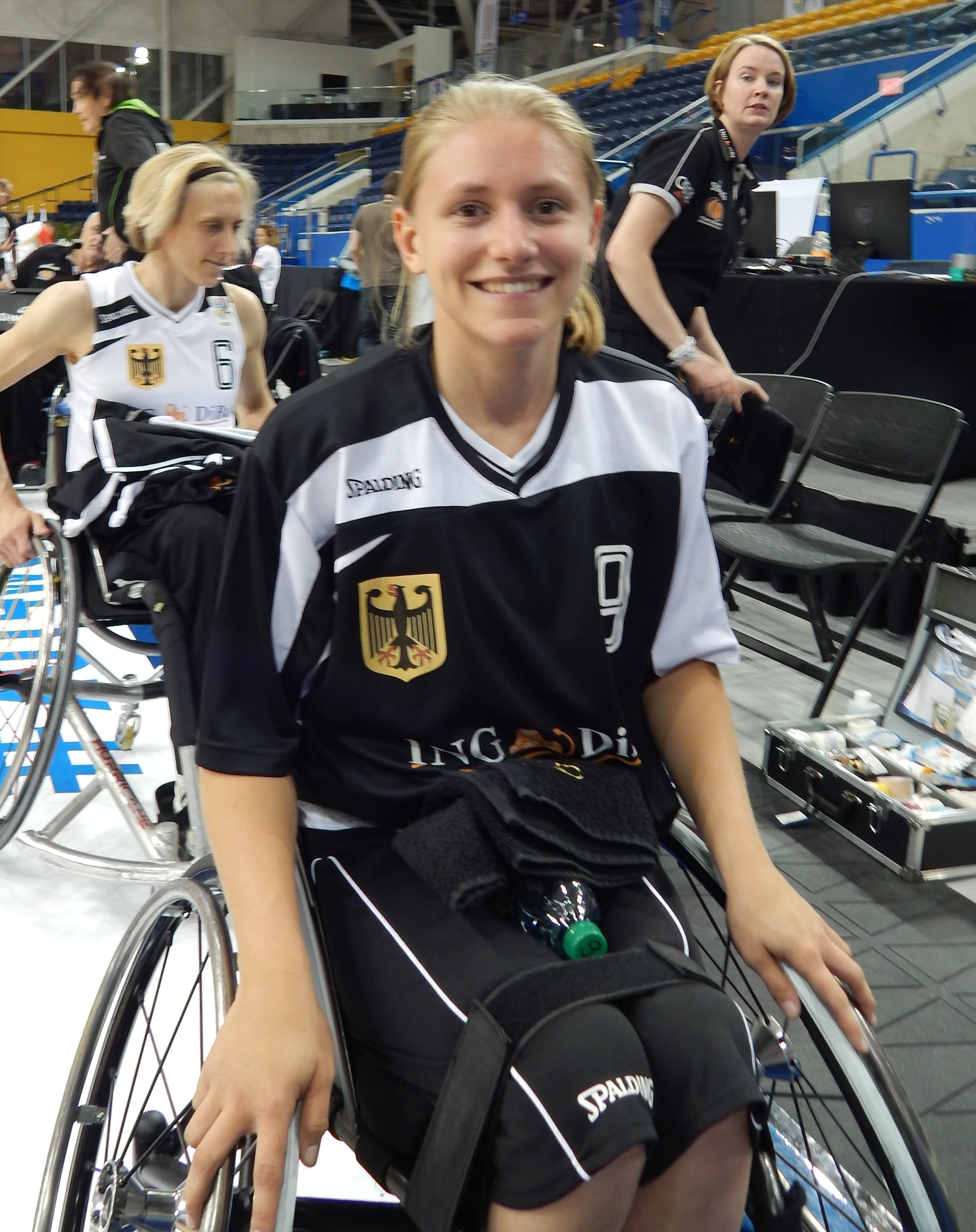

Personal information
- Born: 24 April 1991 (age 35)

Sport
- Country: Germany
- Sport: Wheelchair basketball
- Disability class: 2.0
- Event: Women's team
- College team: University of Wisconsin-Whitewater
- Club: RBB Munich Iguanas
Medal record
Wheelchair basketball
Paralympic Games
Silver medal – second place	2016 Rio de Janeiro	Women's Wheelchair basketball
IWBF World Championship
Silver medal – second place	2014 Toronto, Canada	Women's wheelchair basketball
Bronze medal – third place	2018 Hamburg, Germany	Women's wheelchair basketball

Laura Fürst (born 24 April 1991) is a German 2.0 point national wheelchair basketball player who plays in the wheelchair basketball league for RBB Munich, and for the German national team, with which she won silver at the 2014 Women's World Wheelchair Basketball Championship in Toronto.

== Biography ==
Laura Fürst was born in Munich on 24 April 1991. On 8 March 2008, while she was a 16-year-old exchange student at Petoskey High School in Petoskey, Michigan, Fürst was operating a snowmobile on a trail near Pleasantview Township, Michigan, when she lost control and crashed into a tree. Suffering serious injuries, she was taken to Northern Michigan Hospital in Petoskey, and then to the C.S. Mott Children's Hospital at the University of Michigan Medical Center in Ann Arbor, Michigan. Among her injuries was a shattered vertebra that caused paralysis in her legs, which rendered her an incomplete paraplegic.

Returning to Germany, Fürst went to the Berufsgenossenschaftliche Unfallklinik Murnau in Murnau am Staffelsee, where she was introduced to wheelchair basketball during rehabilitation. Picking up the game quickly, she began playing for SV Reha Augsburg and RBB Munich, junior players being able to play for two teams. In 2011, she was a 2.0 point player with the German team at the U25 Women's World Cup in St. Catharines, Ontario, Canada. This was followed by defeating Sweden in the final to win the U22 European Championship at Stoke Mandeville in England in July 2012.

Fürst entered the University of Wisconsin-Whitewater as a freshman, spending a year studying physical engineering, and playing wheelchair basketball for the University of Wisconsin-Whitewater Warhawks. With her teammates, who included Paralympians Mareike Adermann, Mariska Beijer, Desiree Miller and Rebecca Murray, Fürst helped win the collegiate championship for the Warhawks against the University of Alabama Crimson Tide on 9 March 2013. She also made the Dean's List for the 2012 fall semester for having a grade point average of 3.4 or more in a single semester.

In June 2014, Fürst joined the senior women's team for the 2014 Women's World Wheelchair Basketball Championship in Toronto, Canada. The German team won silver after being defeated by Canada in the final. The German team beat the Netherlands in the 2015 European Championships, to claim its tenth European title. At the 2016 Paralympic Games, it won silver after losing the final to the United States.

== Achievements ==
- 2012: Gold at the U22 European Championship (Stoke Mandeville, England)
- 2014: Silver at the World Championships (Toronto, Canada)
- 2015: Gold at the European Championships (Worcester, England)
- 2016: Silver at the Paralympic Games (Rio de Janeiro, Brazil)
