= Cobi Crispin =

Australian wheelchair basketball player (born 1988)

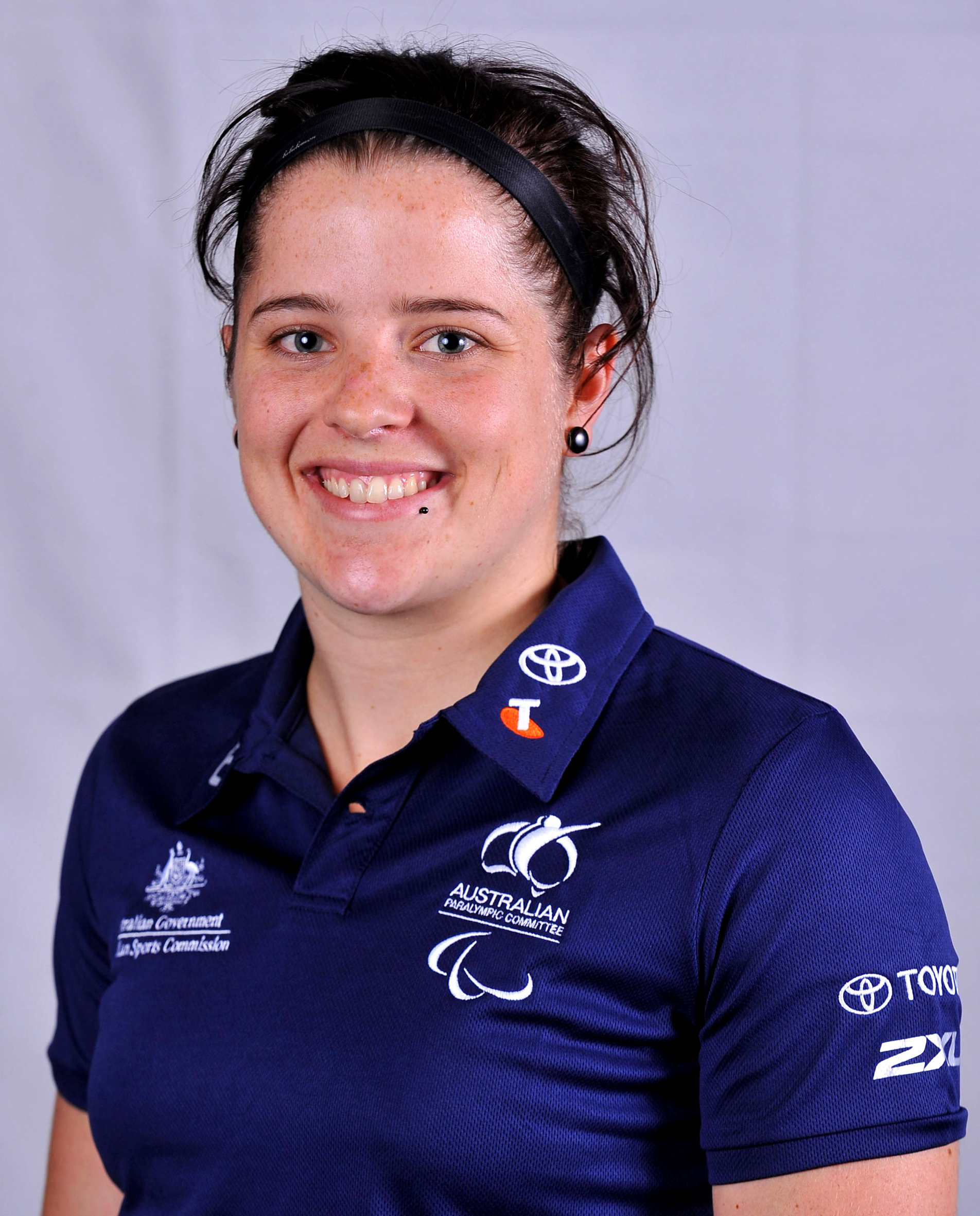
- 2012 Australian Paralympic team portrait of Crispin

Personal information
- Born: 22 December 1988 (age 37)

Sport
- Country: Australia
- Sport: Wheelchair basketball
- Disability class: 4.0
- Event: Women's team
- College team: University of Alabama
- Team: Minecraft Comets
- Coached by: David Gould

Achievements and titles
- Paralympic finals: 2008 Summer Paralympics; 2012 Summer Paralympics
Medal record
Wheelchair basketball
Paralympic Games
| Bronze medal – third place | 2008 Beijing | Women's wheelchair basketball |
| Silver medal – second place | 2012 London | Women's Wheelchair basketball |
U25 Women's World Championships
| Silver medal – second place | 2011 St Catharines | Women's wheelchair basketball |

Cobi Crispin (born 22 December 1988) is a 4 point wheelchair basketball forward from Western Australia. She began playing wheelchair basketball in 2003 when she was 17 years old. The Victorian Institute of Sport and Direct Athlete Support (DAS) program have provided assistance to enable her to play. She played club basketball in the Women's National Wheelchair Basketball League (WNWBL) for the Victorian Dandenong Rangers in 2012 after having previously played for the Western Stars. In 2015 she began playing for the Minecraft Comets. She played for the University of Alabama in the United States in 2013–15.

Crispin made her Australian women's national wheelchair basketball team debut in 2006, competing in the Joseph F. Lyttle World Basketball Challenge that year, and participated in Paralympic qualification in 2007. She remained on the team and was part of the bronze medal-winning Australia women's national wheelchair basketball team at the 2008 Summer Paralympics. At the 2010 IWBF World Championships in Birmingham England, her team finished fourth. The following year, she was captain of the 2011 Under 25 (U25) Women's Wheelchair Basketball team at the 2011 Women's U25 Wheelchair Basketball World Championship, and earned a silver medal. Also in 2012, she participated in Paralympic qualifying, and went on to compete at the 2012 Summer Paralympics where her team finished second.

== Personal life ==
Cobi Crispin was born in Mackay, Queensland, on 22 December 1988, the daughter of Alan and Cathy Crispin. She has three brothers. She was born missing a femur. She moved to Melbourne, Victoria as a result of switching wheelchair basketball club sides to play with the Dandenong Rangers, and now lives in Ashburton, Victoria. Other sports she has had interest in include hockey, swimming and touch football. Her role models are Paralympic wheelchair basketball players Liesl Tesch and Alison Mosely. She was educated at St Patrick's College, Mackay, and as of 2012 attended Deakin University.

== Basketball ==
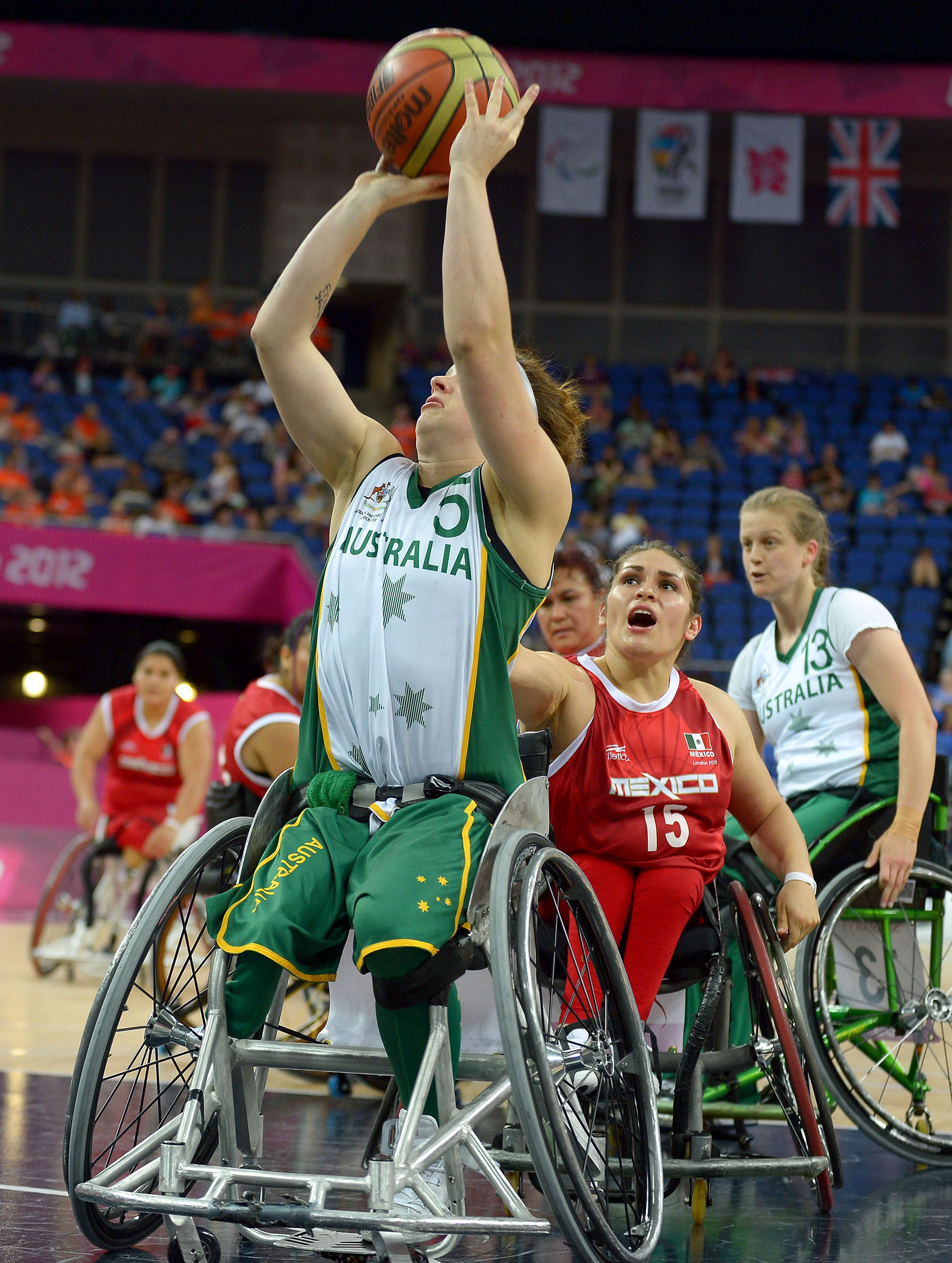
Crispin at the 2012 London Paralympics

Crispin's wheelchair basketball classification is 4.0 point player, and she plays forward. She has played the sport since 2003, when she was 17 years old. In 2009, she was an Aspire to be a Champion grant recipient. In 2010, she had a scholarship with the Victorian Institute of Sport, which provides "provide assistance with specialist coaching, sport science, sports medicine, physical preparation and education and career development services as well as training & competition expenses". In 2010/11 and 2011/12, the Australian Sports Commission gave her A$17,000 grants through the Direct Athlete Support (DAS) program, a scheme which provides direct financial support to elite athletes. She received $5,571 in 2009/10 and $10,000 in 2012/13.

=== National team ===
Crispin's first national team appearance was in 2006. She was selected to participate in a national team training camp in 2010, and was member of the Australia women's national wheelchair basketball team, known as the Gliders, at the 2008 Summer Paralympics in Beijing. The Gliders defeated Japan 53–47 to win the bronze medal.

==== 2012 Paralympics ====
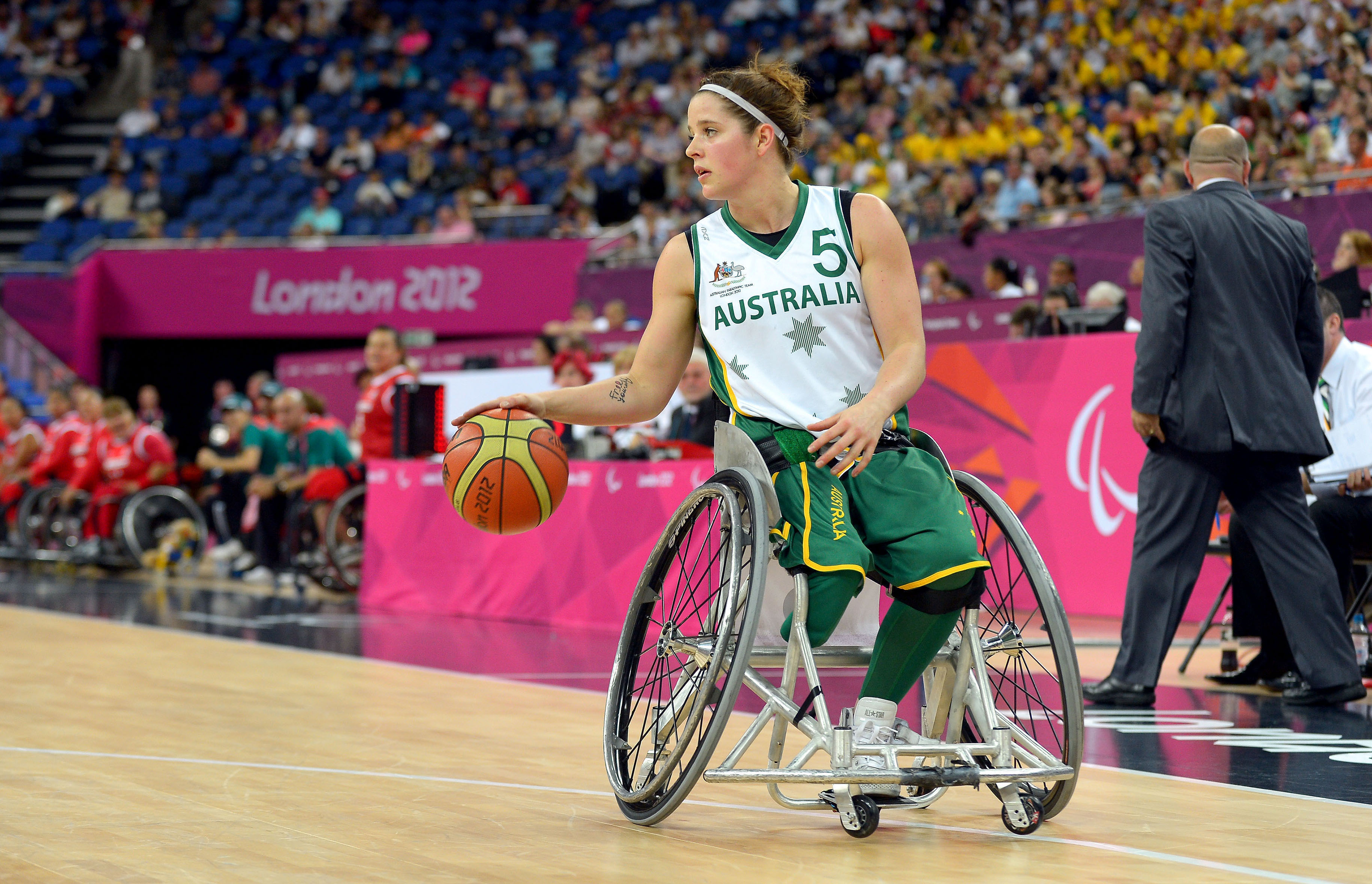
Crispin at the 2012 London Paralympics

In October 2011, Crispin was named to the senior national squad that would compete at the Asia/Oceania Championships 2011 in Goyang, South Korea, a qualifying tournament for the 2012 Summer Paralympics in London, with the top two teams qualifying. The Gliders lost to Japan twice in the qualifying rounds, but made the finals on percentage, and fought their way back from being seven points down at quarter time to defeat China in the gold medal match, 45–44.

In the first game of the 2012 Paralympics tournament against Brazil, which her team won 52–50, she played 32:34 minutes. She scored 18 points against the Brazil women's national wheelchair basketball team, and had seven rebounds. In the team's third game of pool play, where they lost to Canada 50–57, she played 29:43 minutes and scored 12 points. In the team's fourth game of pool play against the Netherlands women's national wheelchair basketball team that her team won 58–49, she played 25:09 minutes, and scored ten points. In her team's quarterfinal 62–37 victory over Mexico women's national wheelchair basketball team, she played 17:08 minutes, and scored twelve points. Her team met the United States women's national wheelchair basketball team in the semifinals, where Australia won 40-39 and she played 24:37 minutes, and scored six points. In the gold medal game against the Germany women's national wheelchair basketball team, she played 29:40 minutes. While her team lost 44-58 and was awarded a silver medal, she scored six points, and had five rebounds.

2012 Summer Paralympic Games
| Game | Minutes | Points | 2 Points | | 3 Points | | Free throws | | Rebounds | | | Assists | Turnovers | Steals | Blocked Shots | Personal Fouls | Fouls Drawn |
|---|---|---|---|---|---|---|---|---|---|---|---|---|---|---|---|---|---|
| Group A Preliminary – Australia vs Brazil | 32:34 | 18 | 7/14 | 50 | 0/0 | 0 | 4/7 | 57 | 2 | 5 | 7 | 3 | 3 | 2 | 0 | 2 | 4 |
| Group A Preliminary – Australia vs Great Britain | 20:49 | 8 | 4/10 | 40 | 0/0 | 0 | 0/0 | 0 | 2 | 5 | 7 | 1 | 1 | 0 | 0 | 3 | 2 |
| Group A Preliminary – Australia vs Canada | 29:43 | 12 | 5/13 | 38 | 0/0 | 0 | 2/3 | 67 | 4 | 11 | 15 | 3 | 3 | 0 | 0 | 5 | 3 |
| Group A Preliminary – Netherlands vs Australia | 25:09 | 10 | 5/10 | 50 | 0/0 | 0 | 0/0 | 0 | 1 | 6 | 7 | 2 | 1 | 0 | 0 | 3 | 1 |
| Quarterfinal – Australia vs Mexico | 17:08 | 12 | 6/9 | 67 | 0/0 | 0 | 0/2 | 0 | 0 | 2 | 2 | 1 | 1 | 1 | 0 | 0 | 3 |
| Semifinal – Australia vs United States | 24:37 | 6 | 3/10 | 30 | 0/0 | 0 | 0/0 | 0 | 1 | 3 | 4 | 1 | 1 | 0 | 1 | 2 | 0 |
| Gold Medal Game – Australia vs Germany | 29:40 | 6 | 3/11 | 27 | 0/0 | 0 | 0/2 | 0 | 3 | 2 | 5 | 0 | 3 | 1 | 0 | 3 | 4 |

==== Other competitions ====
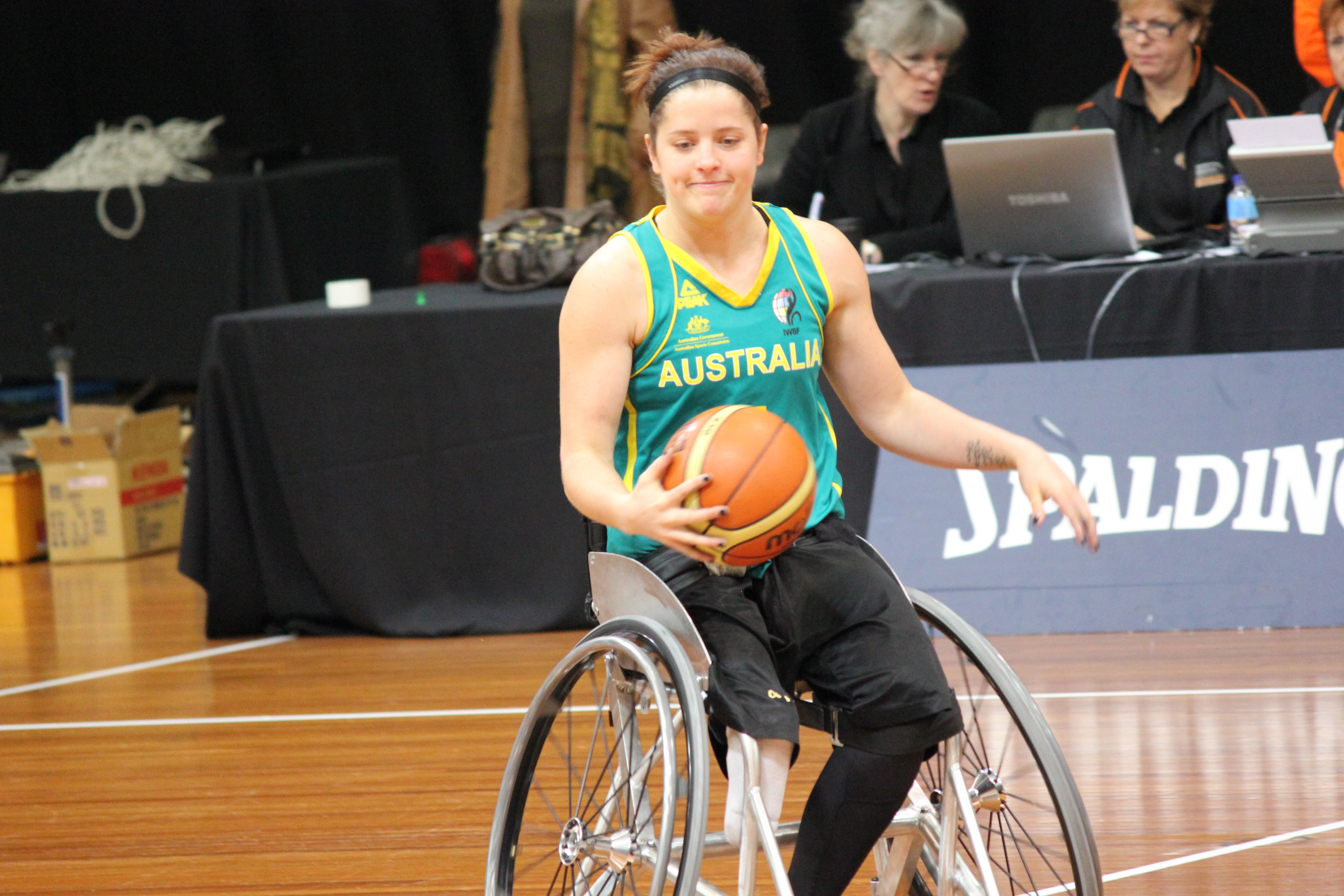
In July 2012 in Sydney

In 2006, Crispin was named the Northern Challenge Most Valuable Player. Organised by the Sporting Wheelies, this competition beings together teams from across northern Queensland. She was also on the squad that competed at the Joseph F. Lyttle World Basketball Challenge that year. In 2007, she played with the national team that the competed in the Asia Oceania Qualification tournament, and the silver medal-winning team that competed at the Osaka Cup. She also played with the 2008, 2009 and 2010 Osaka Cup-winning teams. In 2010, she was part of the fourth place-finishing Australian national squad that competed at the IWBF World Championships, in Birmingham, England.

Crispin was co-captain of the Under 25 (U25) team that competed at the 2011 Women's U25 Wheelchair Basketball World Championship, and finished second. She was the team's top scorer in all but last two matches in the tournament, when as reporter Pat Koopman stated, "the opposition concentrated on nullifying her influence" on the games."

In 2013 Crispin began playing for the University of Alabama, and won the Jessica Staley Impact Award and the Stephanie Wheeler Performance Award for 2013-14. The Alabama team of which she was part went through the season undefeated by women's teams, and defeated the University of Illinois 58-52 to win the 2015 national championship on 28 February 2015.

=== Club basketball ===
In 2008, Crispin was named one of Australia's Women's National Wheelchair Basketball League (WNWBL) All-Star Five. She played her club basketball for WNWBL's Western Stars. In the second round of the 2008 season, the Western Stars defeated the Hills Hornets 52-44. Playing for the Stars, wearing number 5, she scored 14 points in her team's victory. She switched to the Dandenong Rangers for the 2011 season. In her debut game, she scored 28 points and 16 rebounds against her old team. The Rangers went on to win the 2011 WNWBL title, defeating the Sydney Uni Flames 62-59, in a match in which Crispin scored 16 points and was named to the league's All-Star 5. She was with the Rangers again for the 2012 season, in which was named the 2012 WNWBL MVP of the Final Series after scoring 28 points in the Rangers' Championship win against the Stacks Goudkamp Bears. In 2015 she joined the Minecraft Comets.

WNWBL Statistics – Seasons 2009-2012
| Competition | Season | M | FGM-A | FG% | 3PM-A | 3P% | FTM-A | FT% | TOT | AST | PTS |
|---|---|---|---|---|---|---|---|---|---|---|---|
| WNWBL 2009 | 2009 | 17 | 143–333 | 42.9 | 4 | 0 | 31–56 | 55.4 | 8.8 | 6.1 | 18.6 |
| WNWBL 2010 | 2010 | 17 | 151–331 | 45.6 | 2 | 0 | 26–72 | 36.1 | 12.1 | 5.6 | 19.3 |
| WNWBL 2011 | 2011 | 17 | 148–301 | 49.2 | | 0 | 25–65 | 38.5 | 9.3 | 4.8 | 18.9 |
| WNWBL 2012 | 2012 | 14 | 148–244 | 60.7 | | 0 | 18–40 | 45.0 | 11.6 | 4.5 | 22.4 |
| WNWBL 2013 | 2013 | 12 | 89–167 | 53.3 | 1–2 | 50 | 13–34 | 38.2 | 9.8 | 5.3 | 16.0 |
