= Bridie Kean =

Australian Paralympic wheelchair basketball player

Dr. Bridie Kean
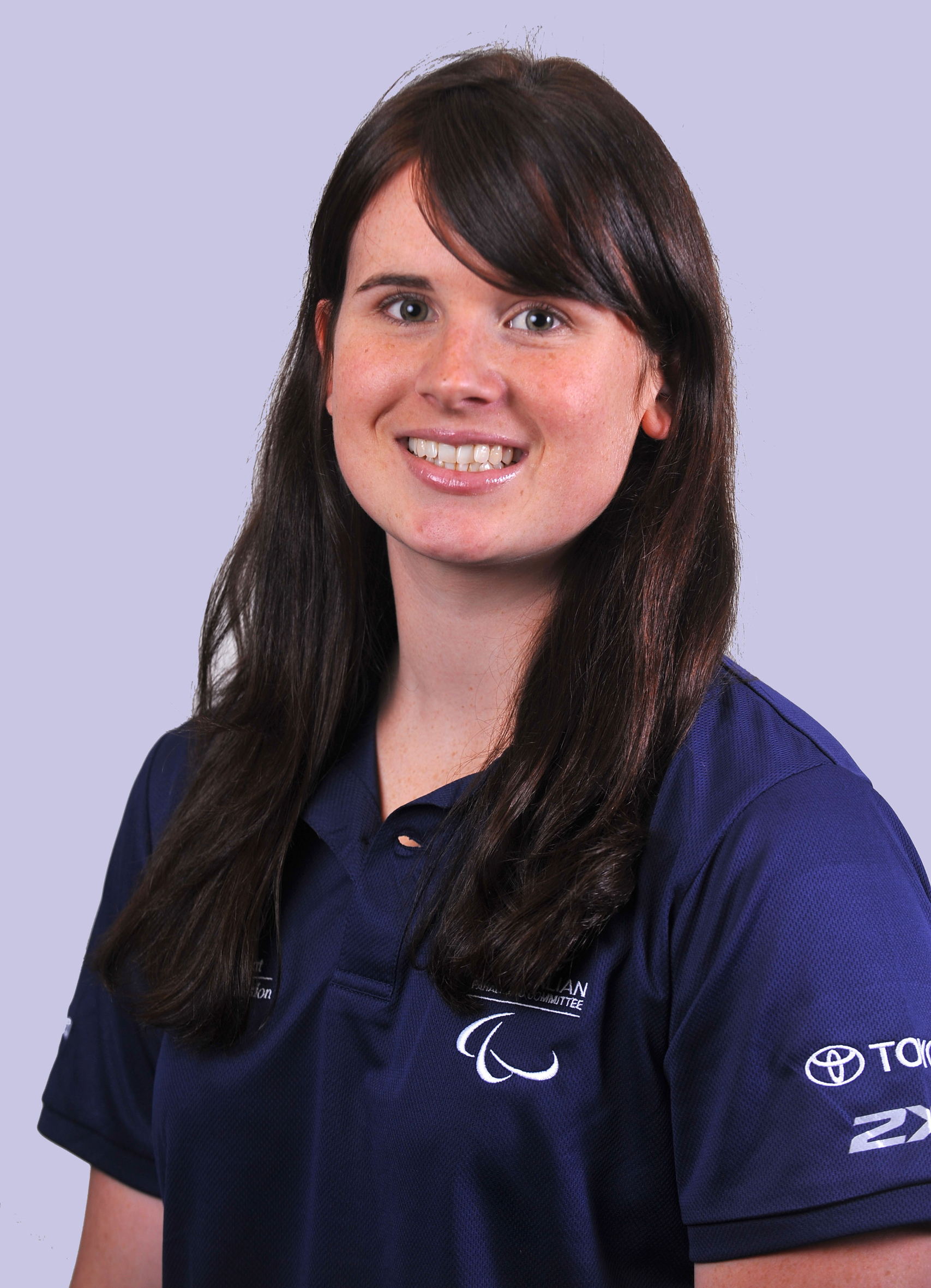
- 2012 Australian Paralympic team portrait of Kean

Personal information
- Born: 27 February 1987 (age 39) Parkdale, Victoria, Australia

Sport
- Country: Australia
- Sport: Wheelchair basketball
- Disability class: 4.0
- Event: Women's team
- College team: University of Illinois at Urbana–Champaign
- Club: Minecraft Comets
Medal record
Wheelchair basketball
Paralympic Games
Bronze medal – third place	2008 Beijing	Women's wheelchair basketball
Silver medal – second place	2012 London	Women's wheelchair basketball
U25 Women's World Championships
Silver medal – second place	2011 St Catharines	Women's wheelchair basketball
Va'a
World Elite and Club Sprints Championships
Gold medal – first place	Lake Kawana	Para Mixed V12 500m
Gold medal – first place	Lake Kawana	Para Mixed V6 1000m

Dr. Bridie Kean (born 27 February 1987) is an Australian wheelchair basketball player and canoeist. She won a bronze medal at the 2008 Summer Paralympics in Beijing, and a silver medal at the 2012 Summer Paralympics in London. In 2016, she became a va'a world champion.

== Personal life ==
Dr. Kean was born 27 February 1987. When she was two, her feet were amputated due to meningococcal septicaemia. She is nicknamed Bird because her friend Kate Dunstan in high school thought it was funny that her name sounded like Bird. Then, when she moved to the United States, her friends struggled to pronounce her first name correctly – it rhymes with "tidy" – when she was living there. And so, the nickname stuck. Her hometown is Parkdale, Victoria. An award in Kean's honour, acknowledging qualities of compassion and bravery, is each year presented to a student at Kilbreda College, where she went to school.

Kean did a gap year in England in 2005. She earned a Bachelor of Science from the University of Illinois, Urbana-Champaign in 2010, and in graduated with a Master of Public Health from the University of Queensland. In 2018, she completed her PhD at the University of the Sunshine Coast. She became the manager of its Sports Elite and Education Dual (SEED) program, which enabled elite athletes with a disability to combine study with high performance training and competition, in 2016. In 2024, she is a Lecturer, Public Health at the University of the Sunshine Coast.

Bridie is engaged to long-term partner and fellow Paralympian Chris Bond. The couple had their first child in late 2019.

Kean is one of three Assistant Chef de Missions for the Australian team at the 2024 Summer Paralympics. In May 2024, she was appointed to the Australian Sports Commission Board.

== Wheelchair basketball ==
When she was 15, Kean was encouraged to take up wheelchair basketball by Liesl Tesch. She was invited to a training camp, and started playing the sport on the state and national level in 2003. In 2011/2012, the Australian Sports Commission gave her a A$17,000 grant as part of their Direct Athlete Support (DAS) program. A 4 point player, she plays as a forward.

=== University ===
Kean had a wheelchair basketball scholarship with the University of Illinois at Urbana–Champaign that ended in 2010.

=== Club ===
Kean made her Women's National Wheelchair Basketball League (WNWBL) debut in 2007. In 2012, she played club basketball for the Brisbane-based Minecraft Comets. That season, she was the team's captain. In September 2012, she played for Hamburger SV, which returned to Germany's top league after a two-season absence. Hamburger SV won the national championship for the eighth time in 2013. In 2014 she returned to Australia, where she spearheaded the Minecraft Comets to their first ever national title win, which was clinched by a crucial three point field goal by Kean in the final stages.

=== National team ===
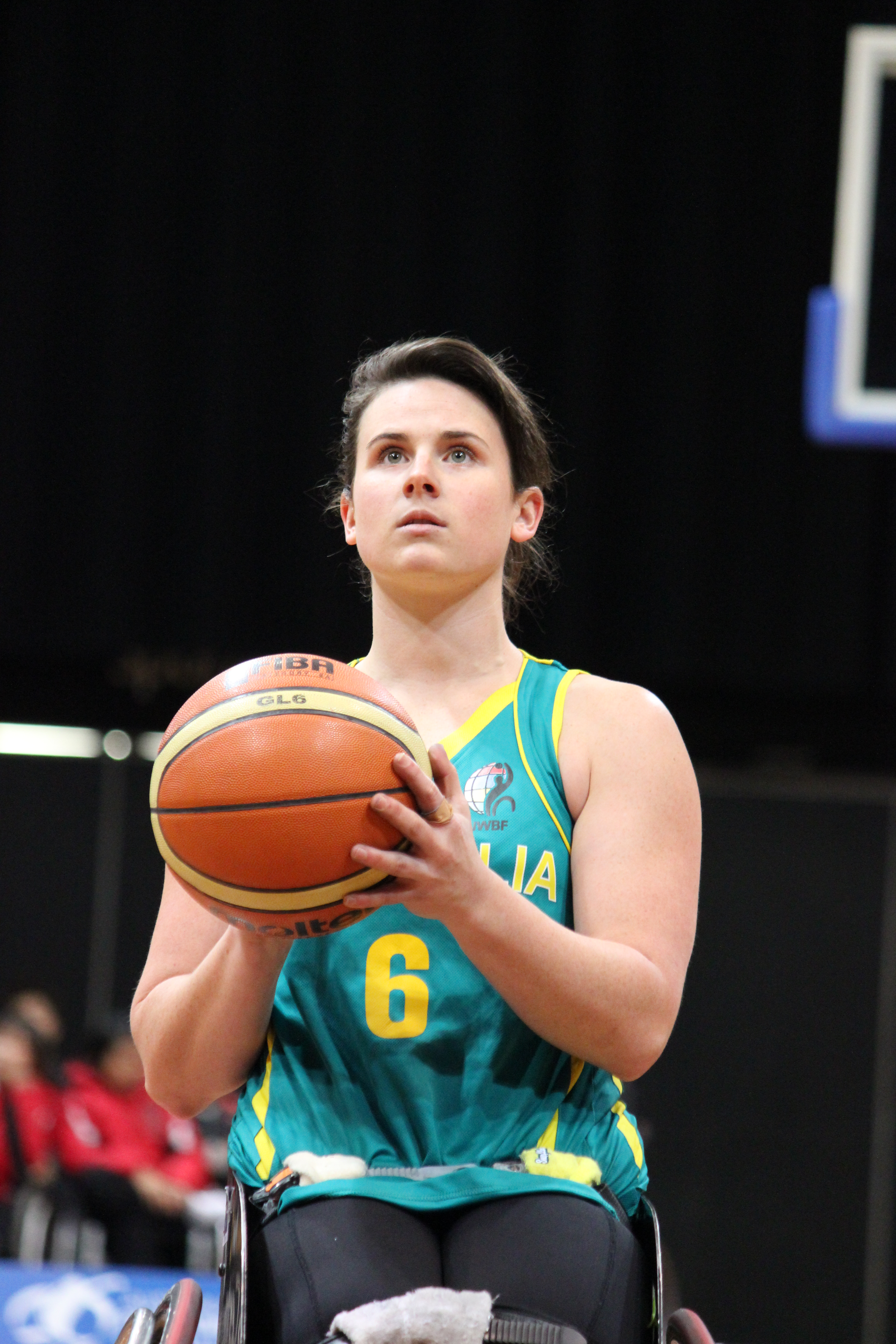
Kean at a game in Sydney in 2012

She made her national team debut in 2007 when she competed in the IWBF Qualification tournament. She was selected to represent Australia at the 2009 Four Nations tournament in Canada, one of six players who played for the Dandenong Rangers in the WNWBL. In July 2010, she played in a three-game test series against Germany. In 2010, she was a member of the team that played in the Osaka Cup. She represented Australia at the 2010 World Championships where her team finished fourth. She came out of retirement in May 2024 to help the Gliders to qualify for the 2024 Summer Paralympics. The team failed to qualify.

==== Paralympics ====
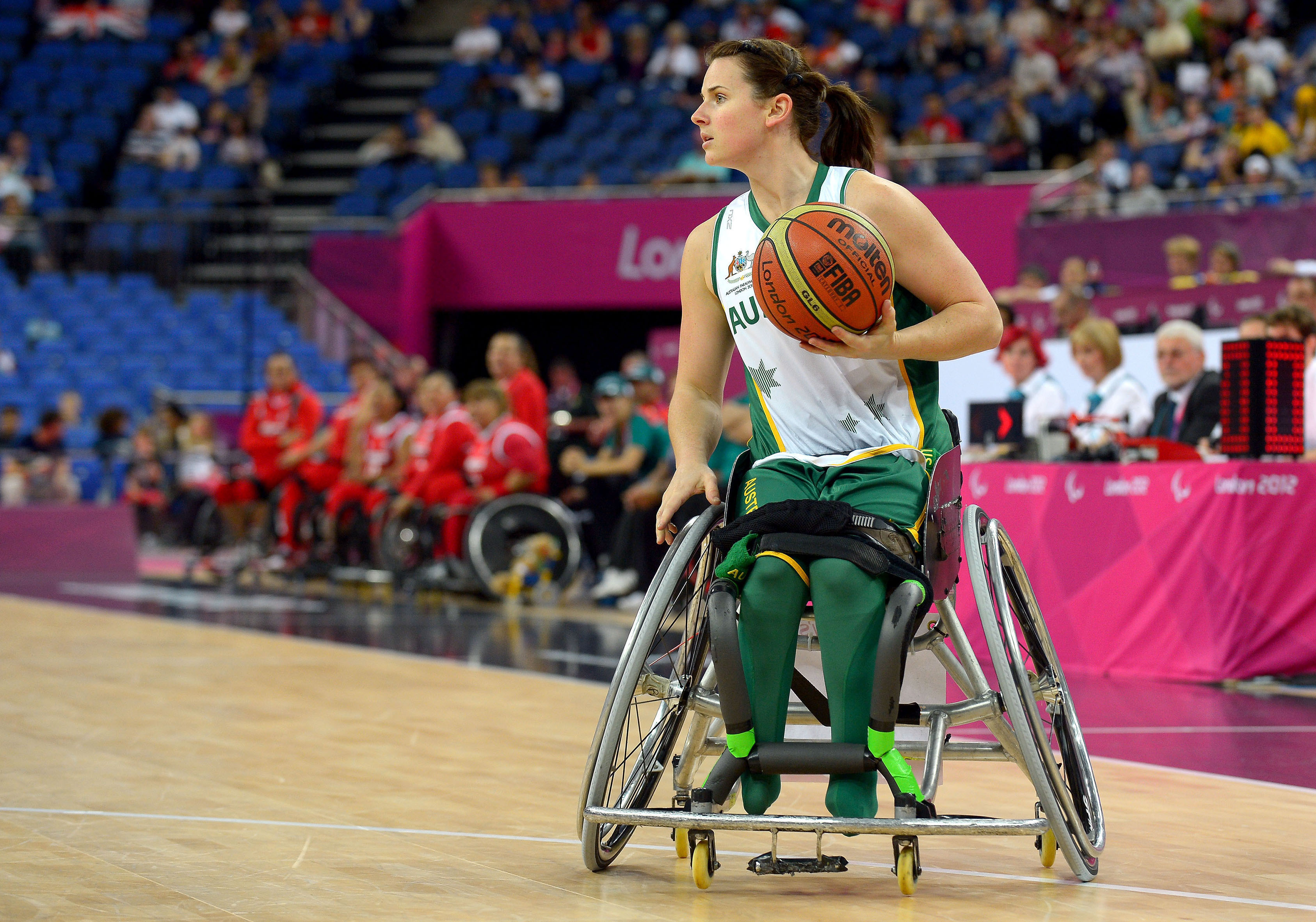
Kean at the 2012 London Paralympics

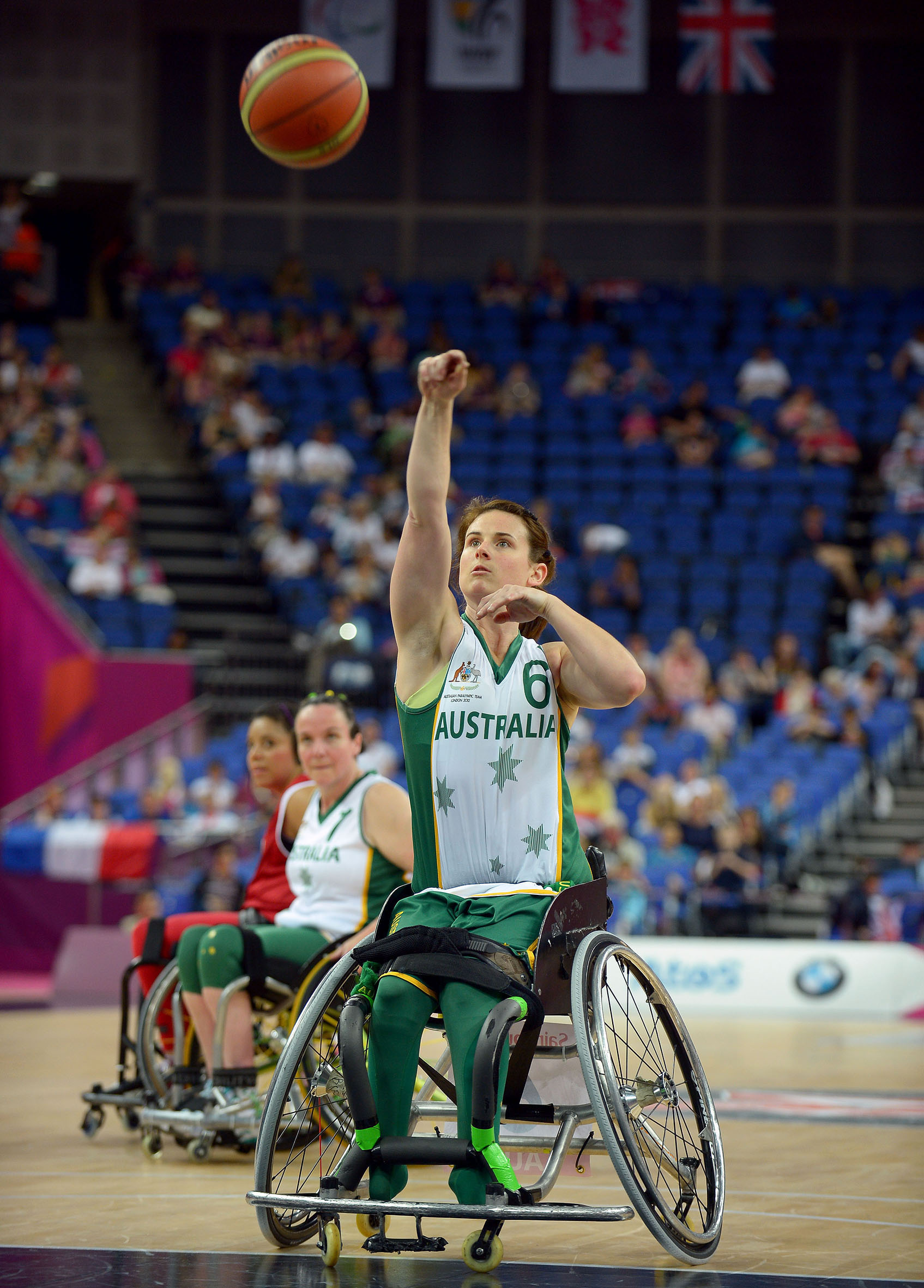
Kean at the 2012 London Paralympics

She was part of the bronze medal-winning Australia women's national wheelchair basketball team, known as the Gliders, at the 2008 Summer Paralympics. Her team defeated Canada 53–47 in earning their medal. She said of her team's 2008 performance, "We worked together as a team really well and our medal is a credit to a lot of hard work and dedication."

In October 2011, she was named as part of the senior national squad that would compete at the Paralympic qualifying tournament for the 2012 Summer Paralympics in London. She was the captain of the Gliders at the 2012 Summer Paralympics. In the gold medal game against Germany, she played 13:02 minutes. Her team lost 44–58, but earned a silver medal. She scored 1 point and had four rebounds in the game.

== Canoeing ==
The Gliders failed to qualify for the 2016 Summer Paralympics in Rio de Janeiro. Kean took up canoeing, coached by Gayle Mayes, who represented Australia at the 1992 Summer Olympics in Barcelona. With her No Limits teammates from Mooloolaba, Queensland, she won gold in the Para Mixed V12 500m and the Para Mixed V6 1000m finals in at the IVF Va'a World Elite and Club Sprints Championships at Lake Kawana on the Sunshine Coast.
