= Abby Stubbert =

Canadian wheelchair basketball player

Personal information
- Born: June 4, 1988 (age 38) Halifax, Nova Scotia
- Listed height: 5 ft 4 in (1.63 m)
Medals
Wheelchair basketball
Gold medal – first place	2009 Artland Open	Women's wheelchair basketball
Silver medal – second place	2011 Osaka Cup	Women's wheelchair basketball

Abby Stubbert (born June 4, 1988) is a Canadian Paralympic wheelchair basketball player from Halifax, Nova Scotia who won a gold medal in the 2009 Artland Open which was hosted in Quakenbruck, Germany and a 2011 silver medal at Osaka Cup which was hosted in Osaka, Japan.

== Early life and education ==
Stubbert graduated from St. Francis Xavier University.

== Career ==
In 2011, Stubbert was a part of the Canada women's national wheelchair basketball team at the 2011 Women's U25 Wheelchair Basketball World Championship.
