= Amy Conroy =

British wheelchair basketball player

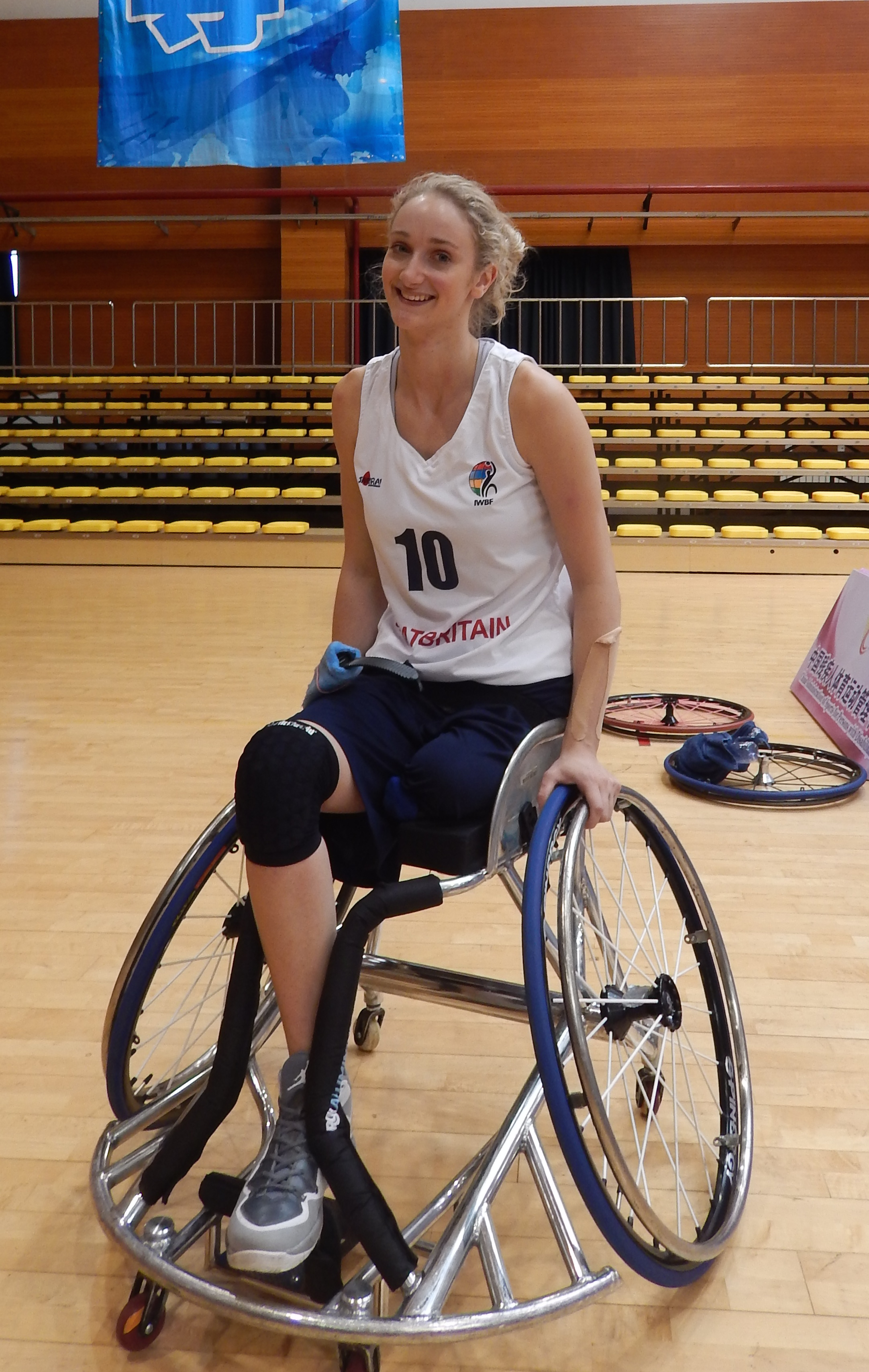
- Conroy at the 2015 Women's U25 Wheelchair Basketball World Championship in Beijing

Personal information
- Nationality: United Kingdom
- Born: 22 October 1992 (age 33)

Sport
- Country: Great Britain
- Sport: Wheelchair basketball
- Disability class: 4.0
- Event: Women's team
- Club: Leicester Cobras
Medal record
Women's wheelchair basketball
Representing Great Britain
World Championships
Silver medal – second place	2018 Hamburg	Team
U25 Women's World Championships
Gold medal – first place	2015 Beijing	Team
European Championships
Silver medal – second place	2025 Sarajevo	Team
Bronze medal – third place	2011 Nazareth	Team
Bronze medal – third place	2013 Frankfurt	Team
Bronze medal – third place	2015 Worcester	Team
Bronze medal – third place	2017 Tenriffe	Team
Women's 3x3 wheelchair basketball
Representing England
Commonwealth Games
Bronze medal – third place	2022 Birmingham	Team

Amy Conroy (born 22 October 1992) is a 4.0 point British wheelchair basketball player who represented Great Britain in the 2012 Paralympic Games in London, the 2016 Summer Paralympics in a Rio de Janeiro, co captained the team to win Gold in the under 25 World Wheelchair Basketball Championships in Beijing and won a silver medal at the 2018 World Wheelchair Basketball Championships in Hamburg.

== Biography ==
Amy Conroy was born on 22 October 1992. When she was young, she was diagnosed with osteosarcoma, a common bone cancer that runs in her family. Chemotherapy failed to arrest the cancer and she had to have her left leg amputated. Conroy tried wheelchair basketball and found that she enjoyed the speed and aggression of the sport.

A 4.0 point player, she made her international debut as a teenager at the 2010 BT Paralympic World Cup. Later that year she participated in the 2010 Wheelchair Basketball World Championship in Birmingham, where Team Great Britain came sixth, its best ever placing. In 2011 they won gold at the BT Paralympic World Cup and bronze at the European Championship.

Conroy made her Paralympic debut at the 2012 Summer Paralympics in London, where she was Team Great Britain's top-scorer in their opening match against the Netherlands. She was top-scorer again with 22 points in the final match again Mexico, where Great Britain secured seventh place, its highest ranking at the Paralympics since the 1996 Summer Paralympics in Atlanta.

In 2013, Conroy was part of the team that won bronze at the European Championship, and silver at the U25 European Championships. The team was placed fifth at the 2014 Women's World Wheelchair Basketball Championship in Toronto. In 2015, she won silver in the Osaka Cup in Japan in February, and was co-captain (with Laurie Williams) of the U25 team at the 2015 Women's U25 Wheelchair Basketball World Championship in Beijing, winning gold. The senior team then defeated France to take bronze in the 2015 European Championship. In May 2016, she was named as part of the team for the 2016 Summer Paralympics in Rio de Janeiro. The British team produced its best ever performance at the Paralympics, making it all the way to the semi-finals, but lost to the semi-final to the United States, and then the bronze medal match to the Netherlands.

Conroy studied social psychology at Loughborough University. In April 2021 she joined the workplace wellbeing platform Champion Health as an ambassador, with the remit of "mak[ing] all areas of wellbeing inclusive and accessible."

== Achievements ==
- 2010: Sixth at the World Wheelchair Basketball Championships (Birmingham, UK)
- 2011: Bronze at the European Championships (Nazareth, Israel)
- 2011: Bronze at the U25 Wheelchair Basketball World Championship (St. Catharines, Canada)
- 2012: Seventh at the 2012 Summer Paralympic Games (London, UK)
- 2013: Bronze at European Championships (Frankfurt, Germany)
- 2014: Fifth at the World Wheelchair Basketball Championship (Toronto, Canada)
- 2015: Silver at the Osaka Cup (Osaka, Japan)
- 2015: Gold at the 2015 Women's U25 Wheelchair Basketball World Championship (Beijing, China)
- 2015: Bronze at the European Championships (Worcester, England)
- 2016: Fourth at the 2016 Paralympics (Rio de Janeiro, Brazil)
- 2017: Bronze at the European Championships (Tenerife, Spain)
- 2018: Silver at the 2018 Wheelchair Basketball World Championship (Hamburg, Germany)
