= Desiree Miller (Paralympian) =

American wheelchair basketball player

Personal information
- Born: 12 August 1987 (age 38) Monroe, Washington, United States

Sport
- Sport: Wheelchair basketball
Medal record
Representing United States
Wheelchair basketball
Paralympic Games
| Gold medal – first place | 2016 Rio de Janeiro | Women's team |
Parapan American Games
| Gold medal – first place | 2011 Guadalajara | Women's team |
| Gold medal – first place | 2015 Toronto | Women's team |

Desiree Miller (born August 12, 1987) is a paralympic athlete from United States of America competing mainly in wheelchair basketball. Miller is the oldest of four children from Eugene and Denise Miller, and has a rare form of spina bifida. Miller believed her disability would bar her from sports activities until she discovered wheelchair basketball.

Miller competed at the 2012 Summer Paralympics and at the 2016 Summer Paralympics. As the captain of the U.S. Women's Wheelchair Basketball Team, the team won the team gold medal in women's wheelchair basketball.

Miller was married to Mareike Miller (Adermann), who is a member of the German Wheelchair Basketball Team. In December 2025, Miller married Katelyn Dittman.
