= Helen Freeman (basketball) =

British wheelchair basketball player

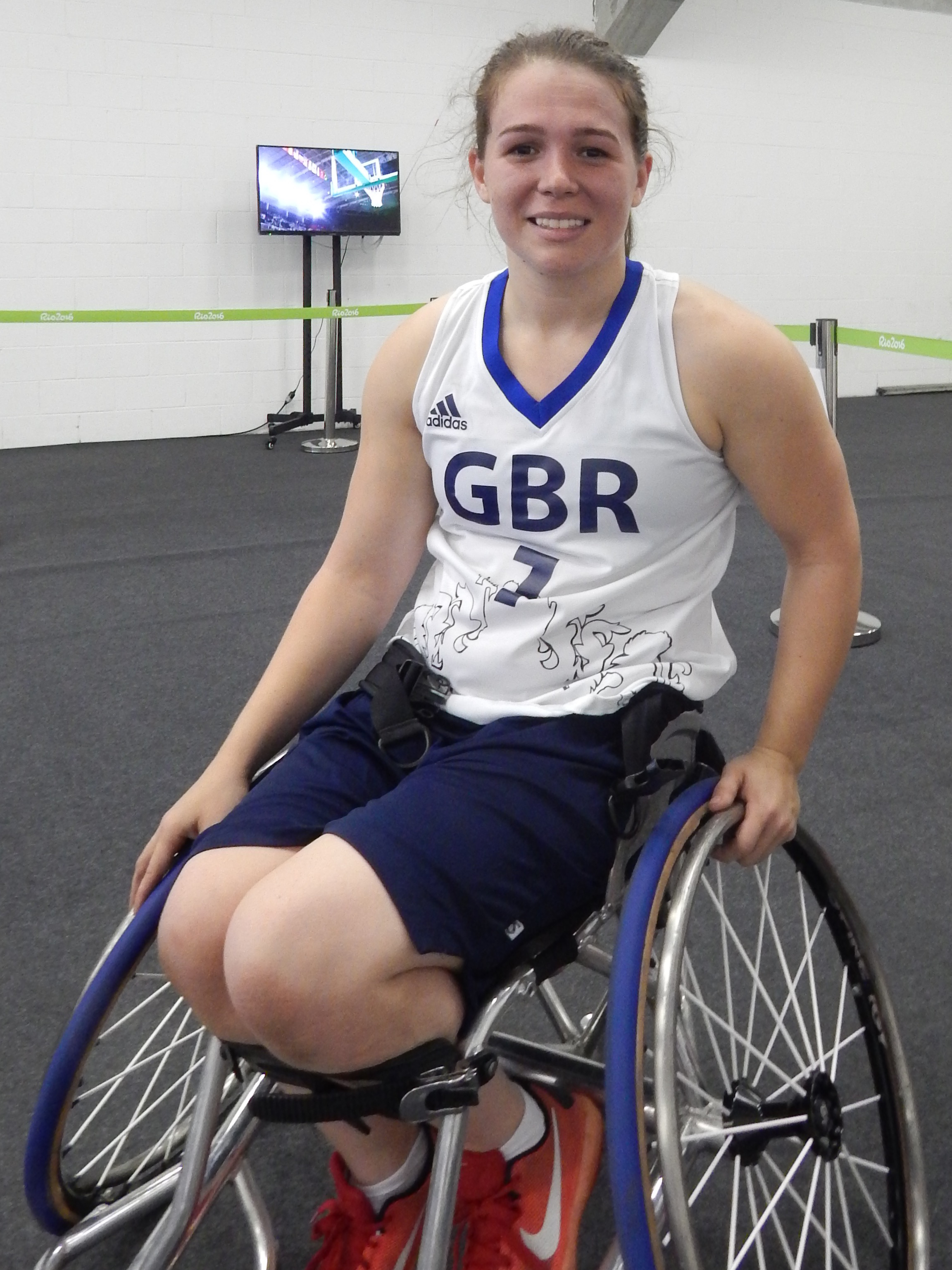

Personal information
- Nationality: Great Britain
- Born: 23 November 1989 (age 36) Watford, Hertfordshire, England

Sport
- Country: Great Britain
- Sport: Wheelchair basketball
- Disability class: 4.0
- Event: Women's team
- College team: University of Illinois at Urbana–Champaign
- Club: Coyotes
Medal record
Wheelchair basketball
U25 Women's World Championships
Bronze medal – third place	2011 St Catherines	Women's wheelchair basketball
European Championships
Bronze medal – third place	2007 Wetzlar, Netherlands	Women's wheelchair basketball
Bronze medal – third place	2009 Stoke Mandeville	Women's wheelchair basketball
Bronze medal – third place	2011 Nazareth	Women's wheelchair basketball
Bronze medal – third place	2013 Frankfurt	Women's wheelchair basketball
Bronze medal – third place	2015 Worcester	Women's wheelchair basketball
Bronze medal – third place	2017 Tenrife	Women's wheelchair basketball
Women's World Championships
Silver medal – second place	2018 Hamburg	Women's wheelchair basketball

Helen Freeman (born 23 November 1989) is a 4.0 point British wheelchair basketball player who represented Great Britain in five European championships, and at the 2008 Summer Paralympics in Beijing, the 2012 Summer Paralympics in London and the 2016 Summer Paralympics in Rio de Janeiro.

== Biography ==
Helen Freeman was born in Watford on 23 November 1989. A 4.0 point player, she began playing wheelchair basketball with Aspire Force when she was 12. She played with the national team at the European Championships in Wetzlar, Germany, in 2007, winning bronze. At age 18, she was the youngest player on the side at the 2008 Summer Paralympics in Beijing. She went on to win bronze medals at the European Championships in 2009, 2011, 2013 and 2015.

She played with the British team that finished sixth at the 2010 Wheelchair Basketball World Championship in Birmingham. This was the team's best ever finish, but at the 2014 Women's World Wheelchair Basketball Championship in Toronto, Canada, they improved to finish fifth. In addition to being the tournament's third highest scorer, she was second in assists per game and sixth in rebounds.

Freeman attended the University of Illinois, where she played on the wheelchair basketball team. She was an Athletic All-American in each of the five years she was there, and an Academic All-American in three of those years. In May 2014 she graduated with a degree in kinesiology, and in August 2015 with a Master of Science degree in Business Administration. In May 2016, she was named as part of the team for the 2016 Summer Paralympics in Rio de Janeiro. The team produced Britain's best ever performance, making it all the way to the semi-finals, but lost to the semi-final to the United States, and then the bronze medal match to the Netherlands.

== Achievements ==
- 2007: Bronze at the European Championships (Wetzlar, Germany)
- 2009: Bronze at the European Championships (Stoke Mandeville, United Kingdom)
- 2011: Bronze at the European Championships (Nazareth, Israel)
- 2011: Bronze at the 2011 Women's U25 Wheelchair Basketball World Championship (St Catharines, Canada)
- 2013: Bronze at the European Championships (Frankfurt, Germany)
- 2015: Bronze at the European Championships (Worcester, England)
- 2017: Bronze at the European Championships (Tenerife, Spain)
- 2018: Silver at the 2018 Wheelchair Basketball World Championship (Hamburg, Germany)
