= Jason Baerg =

Canadian artist

Jason Baerg (born 1970) is a visual artist, media producer and educator who works in drawing, painting, film and new media. He is a member of the Métis Nation of Ontario and developed and implemented the national Metis arts program for the Vancouver Olympics (2010). Baerg lives and works in Toronto.

== Career ==
Baerg was born in Prince Albert, Saskatchewan. He graduated from Concordia University in Montreal with a Bachelors of Fine Arts and received a Masters of Fine Arts from Rutgers University. He taught at Rutgers University (2014–2016) and served as an adjunct instructor at the Institute of American Indian Arts in Santa Fe, New Mexico (Fall of 2016). He is an assistant professor in Indigenous Practices, Contemporary Painting & Media Art at OCAD, Toronto.

== Work ==
Baerg has exhibited his work nationally and internationally at such institutions as the Banff Centre, The FOFA Gallery at Concordia University in Montreal, the Toronto International Art Fair, and Art Basel Miami. In 2023, the Thunder Bay Art Gallery showed Tawâskweyâw ᑕᐋᐧᐢᑫᐧᔮᐤ / A Path or Gap Among the Trees which charted the key contributions Jason Baerg has made in the first 25 years of his practice, including interactive media projection pieces and laser cut painting installations.

As a media producer, Baerg works in the Canadian television and film industry developing documentary and multimedia art projects with such broadcasters as APTN, SunTV and The National Film Board of Canada.

He has won several art awards from the Canada Council for the Arts and the Ontario Arts Council. Baerg has also sat on national art juries for the Canada Council for the Arts and Indian and Northern Affairs Canada and the Ontario Arts Council.

He received a Quebecor Production Fellowship to the Banff New Media Institute (2006) and in 2008 won the prestigious Emerging Artist Award for the Premier's Awards for Excellence in the Arts, granted on behalf of the Ontario Ministry of Culture.
