= Jamey Jewells =

Canadian wheelchair basketball player

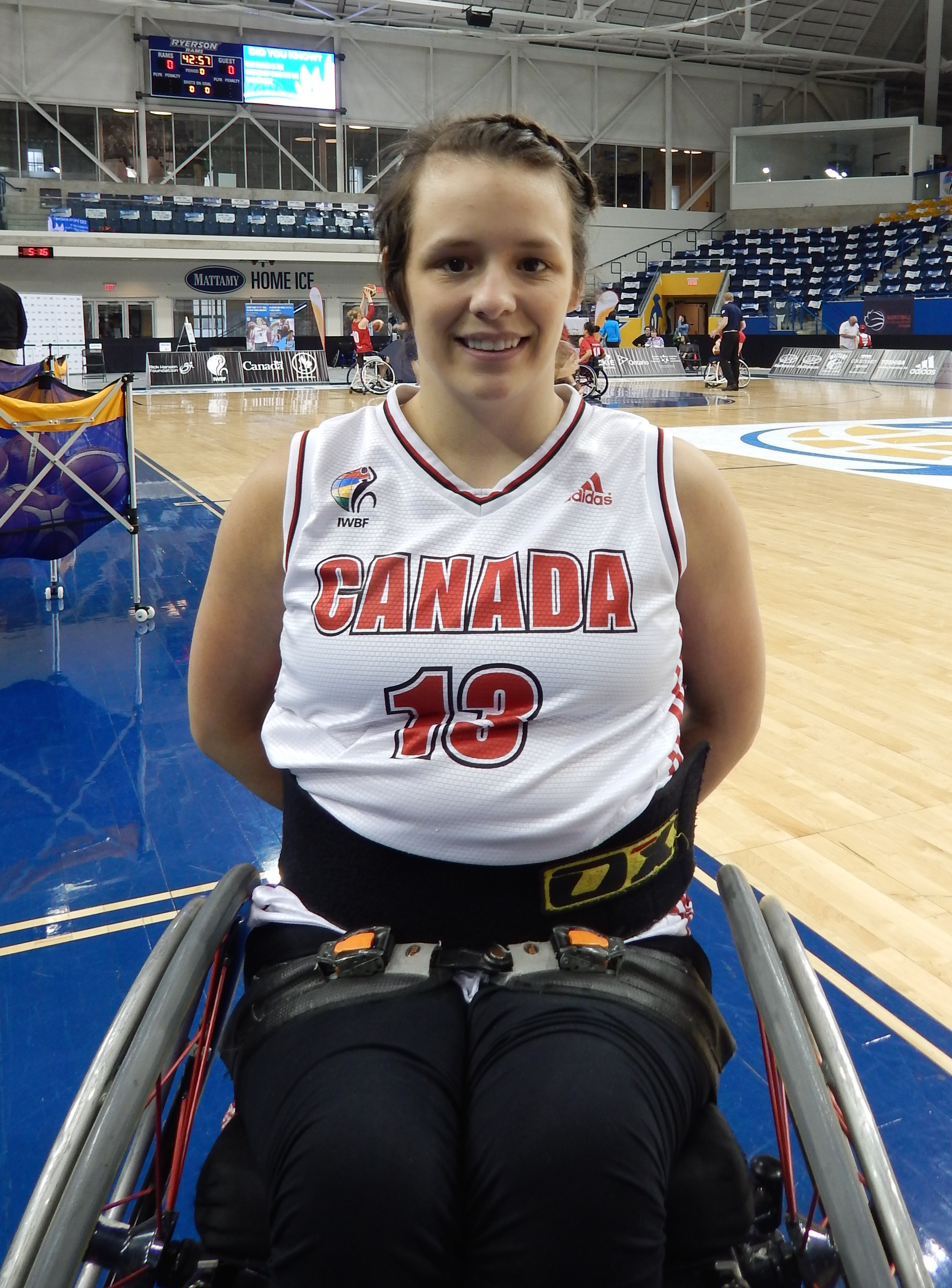
- Team Canada - No 13 - Jamie Jewells

Personal information
- Nationality: Canada
- Born: August 23, 1989 (age 36) Sydney, Nova Scotia, Canada
- Height: 5 ft 6 in (1.68 m)

Sport
- Country: Canada
- Sport: Wheelchair basketball
- Disability class: 1.0
- Event: Women's team
- Club: Nova Scotia Flying Wheels
- Coached by: Michael Broughton and Bill Johnson
Medal record
Wheelchair basketball
World championships
Gold medal – first place	2014 Toronto	Women's wheelchair basketball
Parapan American Games
Silver medal – second place	2007 Rio de Janeiro	Women's wheelchair basketball
Silver medal – second place	2011 Guadalajara	Women's wheelchair basketball
Silver medal – second place	2015 Toronto	Women's wheelchair basketball

Jamey Jewells (born August 23, 1989) is a Canadian 1.0 point wheelchair basketball player, who has played for Team Canada and the Trier Dolphins in Germany. She was born in Sydney, Nova Scotia, and raised in Donkin, Nova Scotia.

Jewells began playing basketball at the age of seven. In 2003, at the age of fourteen, she was severely injured in a car accident, breaking several ribs and her T12-L1 vertebrae, forcing her to spend close to two years in the hospital. Her occupational therapist suggested to her wheelchair basketball to help her recovery. She had to take some time off from 2007 to 2009 due to health and school, and didn't return until 2010. When she did come back, she ended up withdrawing from the Marconi Campus of Nova Scotia Community College in Sydney, so she could focus on her training.

She has played basketball in every province of Canada, the United States, Osaka, Japan, and in Quakenbrück, Germany. In May 2011 she played in Manchester, England. She played in the 2012 Paralympic Games in London, England, and in 2013, was awarded a Queen Elizabeth II Diamond Jubilee Medal. She was part of the team that won a gold medal at the 2014 Women's World Wheelchair Basketball Championship in Toronto in July 2014, and silver at the 2015 Parapan American Games in August 2015.

Jewells is married to Adam Lancia, a member of the Canadian men's wheelchair basketball team. They met in Saskatoon in 2009, and started dating in 2011 when she was living and playing in Germany and he was in Spain. They were married in Port Morien in 2013. They have a daughter. The family relocated to Toronto for two years to prepare for the 2016 Rio Paralympics. The Canadians failed to win a medal after they were knocked out at the quarter final stage by the Dutch women, who had won bronze in London. A devastated Jewells poured out her heart in a Facebook post. "I am absolutely heartbroken for this team," she wrote, "I feel like we deserved a much better fate. We poured our hearts and souls into training and game play, and unfortunately today we came up short. What it is to put four years of your life into one thing to lose it all in a day. I can't even describe how that feels." The Canadian women went on to defeat China to take fifth place. A photograph taken by Reuters photographer Ueslei Marcelino of Jewells receiving a kiss from her husband after that game went viral.

She announced her retirement from the national team in February 2017. She played for the University of Alabama in the United States, where Lancia was her coach.

== International competition ==
- All Star, 2011, Women's U25 World Championships, St. Catharines, Ontario
- 4th, 2011, Women's U25 World Championships, St. Catharines, ON
- Gold, 2014, Women's World Wheelchair Basketball Championships, Toronto, ON
- Silver 2015, ParaPan American Games, Toronto, ON

== Domestic competition ==
- 5th, 2011, Canada Games, Nova Scotia team
- 6th, 2010, Junior National Championships, Nova Scotia team
- 6th, 2010, Women's CWBL National Championships, Nova Scotia / Ontario
- 2nd, 2013, MWBA, Flying Wheels
- 4th, 2014, Women's CWBL National Championships, Calgary Rollers (Richmond B.C)
- 2nd, 2014, MWBA, Flying Wheels
- 2nd, 2015, Women's CWBL National Championships, Calgary Rollers (Calgary, AB)
- 3rd, 2016, Women's CWBL National Championships, Calgary Rollers (Montreal, QC)
- 2nd, 2016, CWBL National Championships, National Academy (Kamloops, BC)
- 1st, 2017, NCAA National Title

(Arlington, TX)

- 1st, 2017, Women's CWBL National Championships, Calgary Rollers

(Burlington, ON)

== Awards and highlights ==
- Named to 2016 Women's National Championship tournament all-star team
- Female top scorer season 2013/2014 Maritime Wheelchair Basketball Association
- League all Star season 2013/2014 Maritime Wheelchair Basketball Association
- Named Defensive Player of the Year by the Maritime Wheelchair Basketball Association season 2013/2014
- Recipient of Queen's Diamond Jubilee Medal (2012)
- Named to 2011 Women's U25 World Championships tournament all-star team
- Named 2011 Ricoh Sport Award for Female Athlete of the Year
