= Ashley Baerg =

Canadian wheelchair basketball player

Club '99

Personal information
- Born: October 23, 1989 (age 37) Saskatoon, Saskatchewan
- Listed height: 4 ft 10 in (147 cm)
Medals
Athletics
Canada Games
Bronze medal – third place	2007 Canada Games	Women's wheelchair basketball
Bronze medal – third place	2011 Canada Games	Women's wheelchair basketball

Ashley Baerg (born October 23, 1989) is a Canadian Paralympic wheelchair basketball player from Saskatoon, Saskatchewan who won 2 bronze medals for both 2007 and 2011 Canada Games.
