= Cindy Ouellet =

Canadian wheelchair basketball player

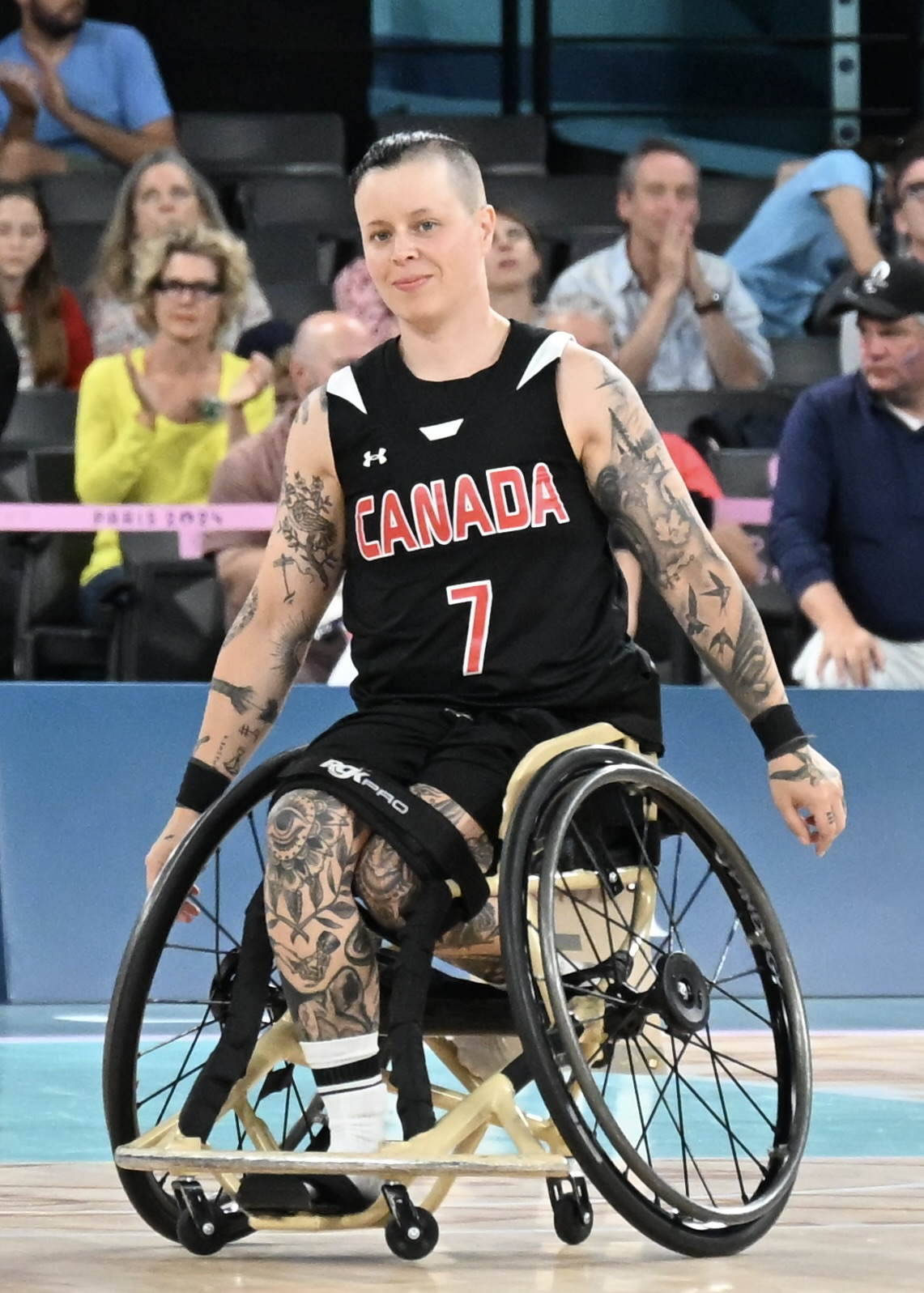
- Ouellet at the 2024 Summer Paralympics

Personal information
- Nickname: The Hornet
- Nationality: Canada
- Born: December 8, 1988 (age 37) Rivière-du-Loup, Quebec, Canada
- Height: 5 ft 2 in (1.57 m)

Sport
- Country: Canada
- Sport: Wheelchair basketball
- Disability class: 3.5
- Event: Women's team
- College team: University of Alabama
Medal record
Women's wheelchair basketball
Representing Canada
World Championship
Gold medal – first place	2014 Toronto	Team
Silver medal – second place	2026 Ottawa	Team
Bronze medal – third place	2010 Birmingham	Team
World Cup
Gold medal – first place	2010 Manchester	Team
Parapan American Games
Gold medal – first place	2019 Lima	Team
Silver medal – second place	2007 Rio	Team
Silver medal – second place	2011 Guadalajara	Team
Silver medal – second place	2015 Toronto	Team
Silver medal – second place	2023 Santiago	Team

Cindy Ouellet (born December 8, 1988) is a Canadian Paralympic wheelchair basketball player. Ouellet is part of the LGBTQ+ community.

== Early life ==
Cindy Ouellet was born on December 8, 1988, in Rivière-du-Loup, Quebec, Canada. At age 12, she was diagnosed with bone cancer which quickly ended her dream of becoming a soccer player and skier.

== Career ==
Ouellet took up wheelchair basketball in 2005. She is classified as a 3.5 point player. She won a gold medal in 2007 at Canada Games for Quebec, and joined the women's senior team later that year. She made her Paralympic debut at the 2008 Summer Paralympics in Beijing. At the 2010 World Championships in Birmingham she won a bronze one following by a silver medal at the 2011 Parapan American Games in Guadalajara, Mexico.

In 2011, Ouellet joined Canada's first-ever Women's U25 National Team, which she led at the inaugural Women's U25 World Wheelchair Basketball Championships in St. Catharines, Ontario, in July 2011. Ouellet was named to the all-star team and finished fourth in overall tournament scoring. She was named MVP of the 2011 CWBL Women's National Championships after leading Quebec to its first-ever gold medal victory.

As of 2014, she is attending University of Alabama, where she wants to get PhD in biomedical engineering, and participates in the women's wheelchair basketball team there. In 2013, she was awarded a Queen Elizabeth II Diamond Jubilee Medal and was again named MVP at the CWBL Women's Championship. She was part of the team that won a gold medal at the 2014 Women's World Wheelchair Basketball Championship in Toronto in July 2014, and silver at the 2015 Parapan American Games in August 2015.

In 2016, she participated at CrossFit weight lifting competition.

In a 2018 interview with Radio Canada, she said that she will participate in 2 more Paralympic competitions. She mentioned that if it won't be in South Korea it will be in Tokyo in 2020 and 2022 Winter Paralympics in Beijing, China.

In August 2021, Ouellet competed at the 2020 Summer Paralympics in Tokyo, Japan in women's wheelchair basketball. Canada's women's wheelchair basketball team placed 5th overall. In September 2024, Ouellet competed at the 2024 Summer Paralympics in Paris, France in women's wheelchair basketball. Canada's women's wheelchair basketball team placed 4th overall.

Statistics
Competition	Season	Matches	FGM-A	FG%	3PM-A	3P%	FTM-A	FT%	OR-DR	AST	PTS
World Championship	2014	8	57-129	44	0-14	0	11-21	52	9-16	71	125
Paralympic Games	2012	7	36-89	40	0-4	0	10-17	59	14-31	50	82
World Championship	2010	7	21-58	36	0-4	0	4-16	25	7-32	31	46
Paralympic Games	2008	7	16-32	50	0-3	0	1-7	14	7-5	10	33

Key
FGM, FGA, FG%: field goals made, attempted and percentage	3PM, 3PA, 3P%: three-point field goals made, attempted and percentage
FTM, FTA, FT%: free throws made, attempted and percentage	OR, DR: offensive, defensive rebounds
PTS: points	AST: assists

== Awards ==
- Queen Elizabeth II Diamond Jubilee Medal (2013)
- Wheelchair Basketball Canada Female Athlete of the Year (2012)
- Women's U25 World Championships tournament all-star team (2011)
- CWBL Women's National Championships tournament all-star team (2012)
- CWBL Women's National Championships tournament all-star team (2010)
- Wheelchair Basketball Canada Junior Athlete of the Year (2007)
