= Rebecca Murray =

American wheelchair basketball player

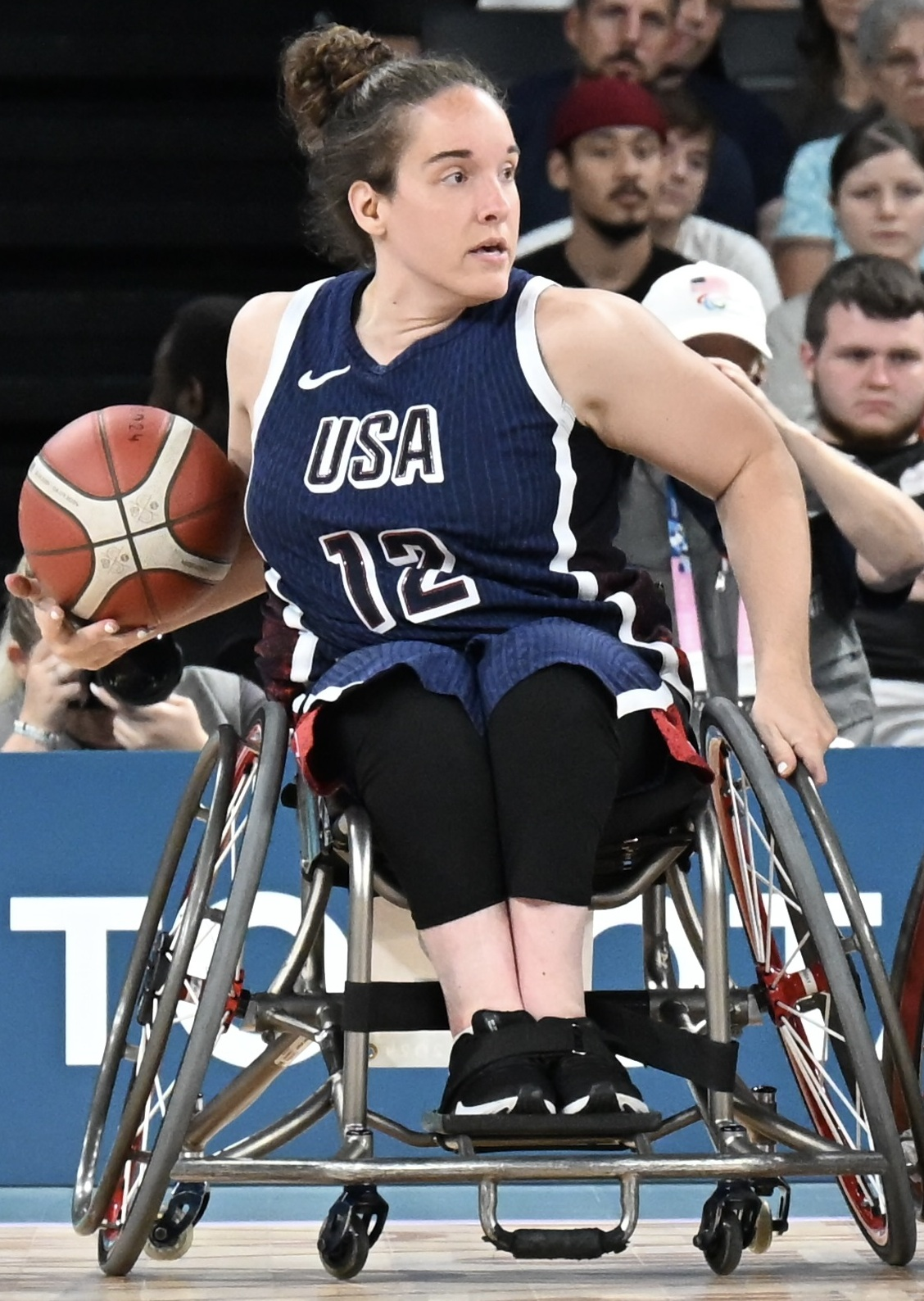
- Murray at the 2024 Summer Paralympics

Personal information
- Full name: Rebecca Marie Murray
- Nickname: Becca
- Born: March 15, 1990 (age 36) Milwaukee, Wisconsin, USA
- Height: 5 ft 4 in (1.63 m)

Sport
- Sport: Wheelchair basketball
- Disability class: 2.5
- Coached by: Christina Schwab
Medal record
Representing the United States
Women's wheelchair basketball
Paralympic Games
Gold medal – first place	2008 Beijing	Team
Gold medal – first place	2016 Rio	Team
Silver medal – second place	2024 Paris	Team
World Championship
Gold medal – first place	2026 Ottawa	Team
Silver medal – second place	2010 Birmingham	Team
Bronze medal – third place	2022 Dubai	Team
Parapan American Games
Gold medal – first place	2007 Rio	Team
Gold medal – first place	2011 Guadalajara	Team
Gold medal – first place	2023 Santiago	Team

Rebecca Marie Murray (born March 15, 1990) is an American wheelchair basketball player and member of the United States women's national wheelchair basketball team. She is a three-time Parapan American Games gold medalist in 2007, 2011 and 2023. In 2010, she won two more gold medals at IWBF World Championship and at U25 World Championship in 2011.

== Early life ==
Murray was born on March 15, 1990, in Milwaukee, Wisconsin to parents Richard and Linda Murray. She was born with spina bifida which paralyzed her from the waist down. She first started playing wheelchair basketball at the age of six through the assistance of the IndependenceFirst organization. Murray remained with the sport and began attending a University of Wisconsin–Whitewater wheelchair basketball camp before joining the Milwaukee Wizards at the age of 12.

Murray graduated from Germantown High School in 2008 and enrolled at the University of Wisconsin–Whitewater for a degree in special education.

== Career ==
At the age of 18, Murray made her Summer Paralympic Games debut at the 2008 Summer Paralympics where she helped the United States women's national wheelchair basketball team win a gold medal. Following this, she became a IWBF World Championships gold medalist in 2010 and a Parapan American Games gold medalist in 2011.

During the 2016 Summer Paralympics, Murray was the leading scorer in both games leading up to the gold medal round. She scored 31 points in the semi-final win against Great Britain and 33 points to win the gold medal over Germany. As a result of her play, she was named a finalist for Team USA's Female Athlete of the Paralympic Games. Following the Games, Murray took a break from competition but returned for the qualifications for the 2020 Summer Paralympics. However, as a result of the COVID-19 pandemic, Murray chose to quit the sport before the Games began.

She represented the United States at the 2022 Wheelchair Basketball World Championships and won a bronze medal.

In November 2023 she competed at the 2023 Parapan American Games in the wheelchair basketball tournament and won a gold medal. As a result, the team earned an automatic bid to the 2024 Summer Paralympics. On March 30, 2024, she was named to Team USA's roster to compete at the 2024 Summer Paralympics.
