= Mareike Miller =

German wheelchair basketball player

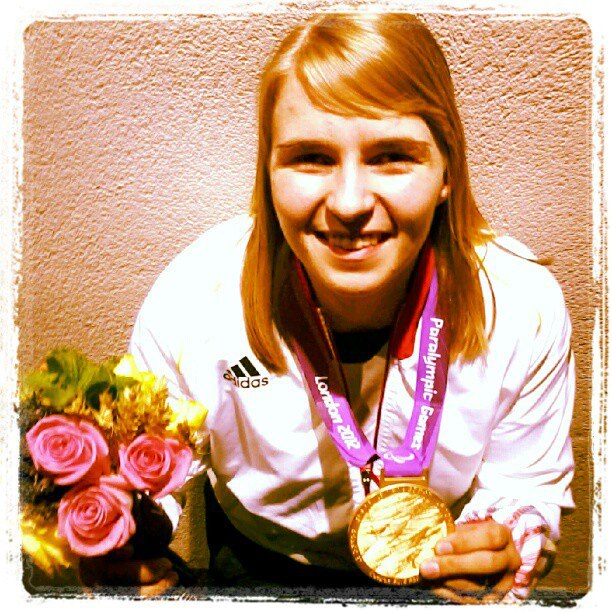
- Mareike (Adermann) Miller with the gold medal after winning the women's wheelchair basketball competition at the London Paralympic Games 2012.

Personal information
- Born: 3 August 1990 (age 35)
- Website: facebook.com/mareikemiller

Sport
- Country: Germany
- Sport: Wheelchair basketball
- Disability class: 4.5
- College team: University of Wisconsin-Whitewater
- Team: Doneck Dolphins Trier
- Coached by: Dirk Passiwan

Achievements and titles
- Paralympic finals: 2012 Paralympics, 2016 Paralympics
Medal record
Wheelchair basketball
Paralympic Games
Gold medal – first place	2012 London	Women's Wheelchair basketball
Silver medal – second place	2016 Rio de Janeiro	Women's Wheelchair basketball
IWBF World Championship
Silver medal – second place	2010 Birmingham, Great Britain	Women's wheelchair basketball
Silver medal – second place	2014 Toronto, Canada	Women's wheelchair basketball
Bronze medal – third place	2018 Hamburg, Germany	Women's wheelchair basketball

Mareike Miller (née Adermann; born 3 August 1990) is a wheelchair basketball player, who played for the University of Wisconsin-Whitewater in the United States. She also plays for the German national team, with which she won two European titles, was runner-up at 2010 and 2014 World Championships, won a gold medal at the 2012 Summer Paralympics in London and won a silver medal at the Rio 2016 Paralympics in Rio de Janeiro. President Joachim Gauck awarded the team Germany's highest sporting honour, the Silbernes Lorbeerblatt (Silver Laurel Leaf), twice (2012 and 2016). Miller is part of the LGBTQ+ community.

== Biography ==
Mareike Miller was born on 3 August 1990, the daughter of Karl-Heinz and Kristin. She has a brother, Nils. She is nicknamed "MA".

Miller began playing basketball at the age of seven, and made her debut with a women's senior club team in Germany when she was 14. In that first game, she suffered a torn anterior cruciate ligament. Over the next four years, she underwent knee surgery four times, three in the right knee, and once in the left, leaving her knees scarred. On each occasion she took eight months to recover, and ruptured an anterior cruciate ligament within weeks of returning to playing.

At the age of 18, Miller was forced to give up her dream of playing basketball. However, her physical education teacher suggested that she try wheelchair basketball, a sport she had never heard of. Although she is a wheelchair basketball player, Miller does not require a wheelchair for everyday activities, and is classified as a 4.5 point player with a minimal disability. Being able to move her body fully gives the 180 centimetres (71 in) tall center a height advantage, but she found that shooting from the free throw line in a chair requires as much force as shooting standing from the three-point line.

One of the greatest pleasures of life is doing the things that others say you can not do.

— Mareike Miller

When Miller took up wheelchair basketball in 2008, she was not thinking of making the national team, but with hard work and daily practice, she made it in just one year. That year she started playing for ASV Bonn in the German regional league. In 2009, she began attending University of Wisconsin-Whitewater in the United States, where she studied business administration. She found the workload much higher than in Germany. Whereas most German clubs trained only two of three times a week, training in the United States was every day, with weight and training rooms available 24 hours a day, seven days a week. While in Germany for summer breaks, she trained with the second division team Essen Hot Rolling Bears and travelled twice a week to Cologne to train with the Köln 99ers.

In 2011, she captained the German Under 25 (U25) National team, competing at their first ever World Championships.

In March 2012, her UWW Warhawks team, coached by Daniel T. Price, defeated the University of Alabama 63–34 to win the US Intercollegiate National Championships in a game in which Miller scored 17 points and had 13 rebounds. Later that year, Miller headed to Australia, Netherlands and Charlotte, North Carolina for training camps with the German women's wheelchair basketball national team before the 2012 Summer Paralympics in London.

In the Gold Medal match in London, the team faced the Australia women's national wheelchair basketball team, who had defeated them 48–46 in Sydney just a few months before, in front of a crowd of over 12,000 at the North Greenwich Arena. The German team had been undefeated up to that point, but had started off slow in its games against the United States and China, winning these games by six-point margins, and seemed to play its best basketball only in the final minutes of a game. Miller scored 19 points, more than any other player in the match, and was a key factor in Germany winning 58–44. "Most of my shots weren’t even any crazy shots or any outside shots", Miller said. "They were the same shots I took in the others games, but I played more in this game, and I had many more easy opportunities getting into the paint." "I’m always one of the shooters, but I think Australia underestimated me and didn’t defend me as well as some of the other girls. They left me open a lot and I got some big shots, so it went well for me. It just worked out that I scored the most points in the final, but it wasn’t deliberate."

It was the first gold medal that Germany had won in women's wheelchair basketball at the Paralympics since 1984. They were awarded the Silver Laurel Leaf by President Joachim Gauck in November 2012, and were named German Team of the Year for 2012. "Many times, I was told that after winning a gold medal, I have achieved the most I can, so I could quit now," Miller later wrote, "But I disagree."

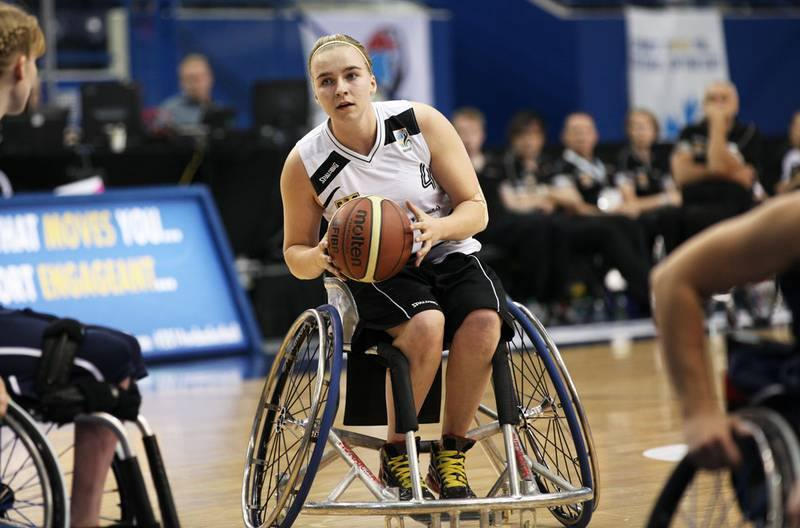
Mareike Miller at World Championships 2014.

After a devastating loss in the European Championship final on home soil in 2013, the German team claimed silver at the 2014 Women's World Wheelchair Basketball Championship in Toronto, Canada,

2015, Miller had to have more surgeries on her knees and thus could not play with the German team. At the 2016 Paralympic Games, she returned and won silver after losing the final to the United States.

After the 2016 Paralympic Games, several athletes and the German national team head coach retired. Miller remained as one of the experienced players of the team, now playing for Martin Otto, the PE teacher who got her to play the sport in the first place. As part of the captain trio, she led her team to another European Championship silver medal in 2017, showing that the team even with many changes is continuing on a high level.

2018 marks the year of World Championships in Hamburg, Germany. Miller will captain the team competing in front of her home crowds as she also currently lives in Hamburg and plays for the professional team BG Baskets Hamburg.

Miller competed in women's wheelchair basketball at the 2024 Summer Paralympics in Paris, France. Germany placed 6th overall.

== Achievements ==
- 2009: Gold at the European Championships
- 2009: Silver at German Women's National Championships
- 2010: Silver at the Women's World Championships
- 2010: Bronze at the U22 mixed European Championships
- 2010: Gold at German Women's National Championships
- 2011: Silver at German Women's National Championships
- 2011: Gold at the European Championships (Nazareth, Israel)
- 2012: Intercollegiate Champion
- 2012: Silver at German Women's National Championships
- 2012: Gold at the Paralympic Games (London, England)
- 2013: Intercollegiate Champion
- 2013: Silver European Championships (Frankfurt, Germany)
- 2014: Intercollegiate Champion
- 2014: Silver at the World Championships (Toronto, Canada)
- 2016: Silver at the Paralympic Games (Rio de Janeiro, Brazil)
- 2017: Silver European Championships
- 2018: Bronze at the World Championships (Hamburg, Germany)
- 2019: Silver European Championships
- 2021: 4th Place and German Flagbearer at the Paralympic Games (Tokyo, Japan)
- 2023: 4th Place World Championships
- 2023: 4th Place European Championships
- 2024: 6th Place at the Paralympic Games (Paris, France)

== Awards ==
- 2011, 2012, 2014, 2016: Team of the Year
- 2012 and 2014: Silver Laurel Leaf
Sydney July 2012
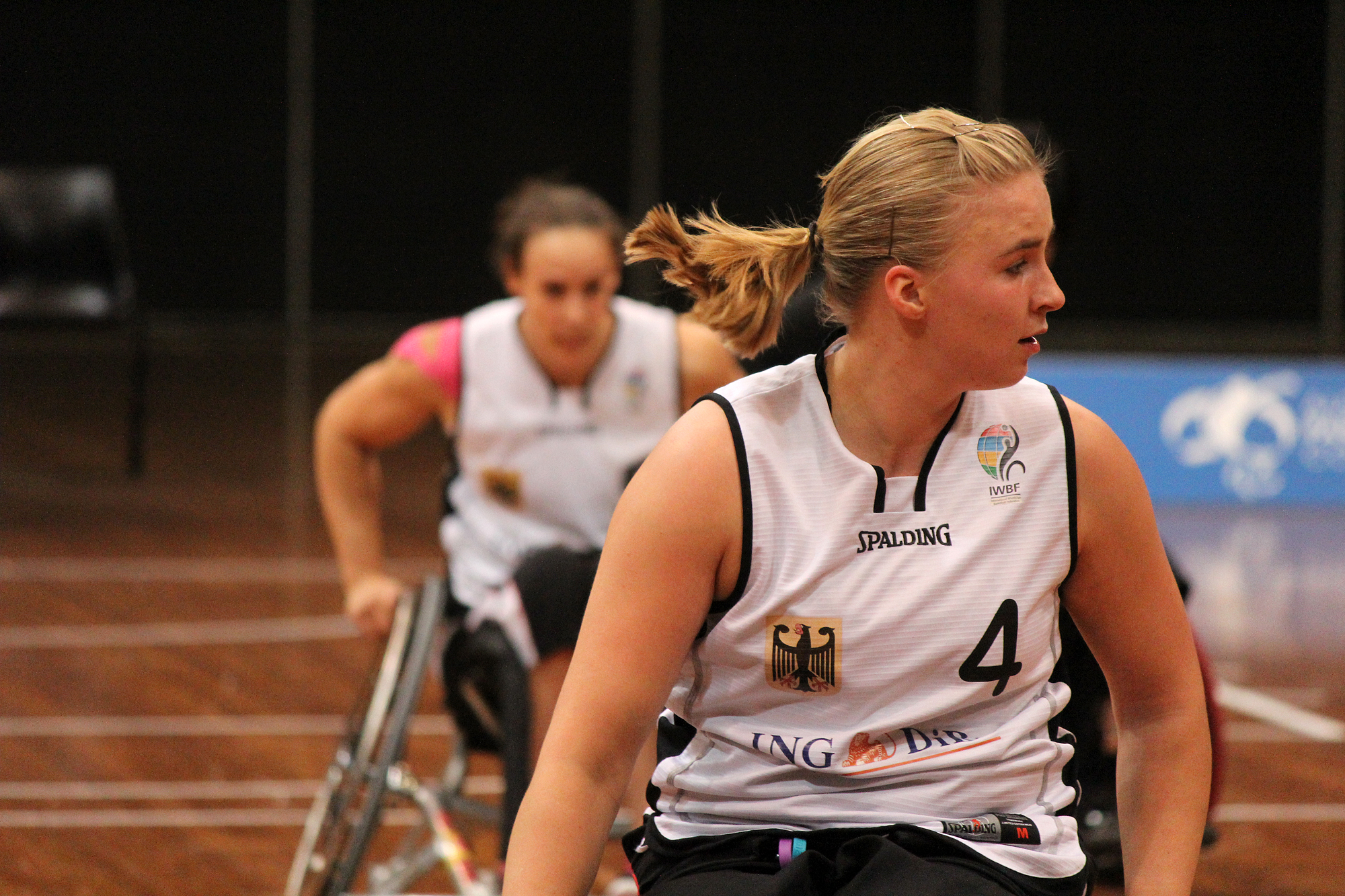

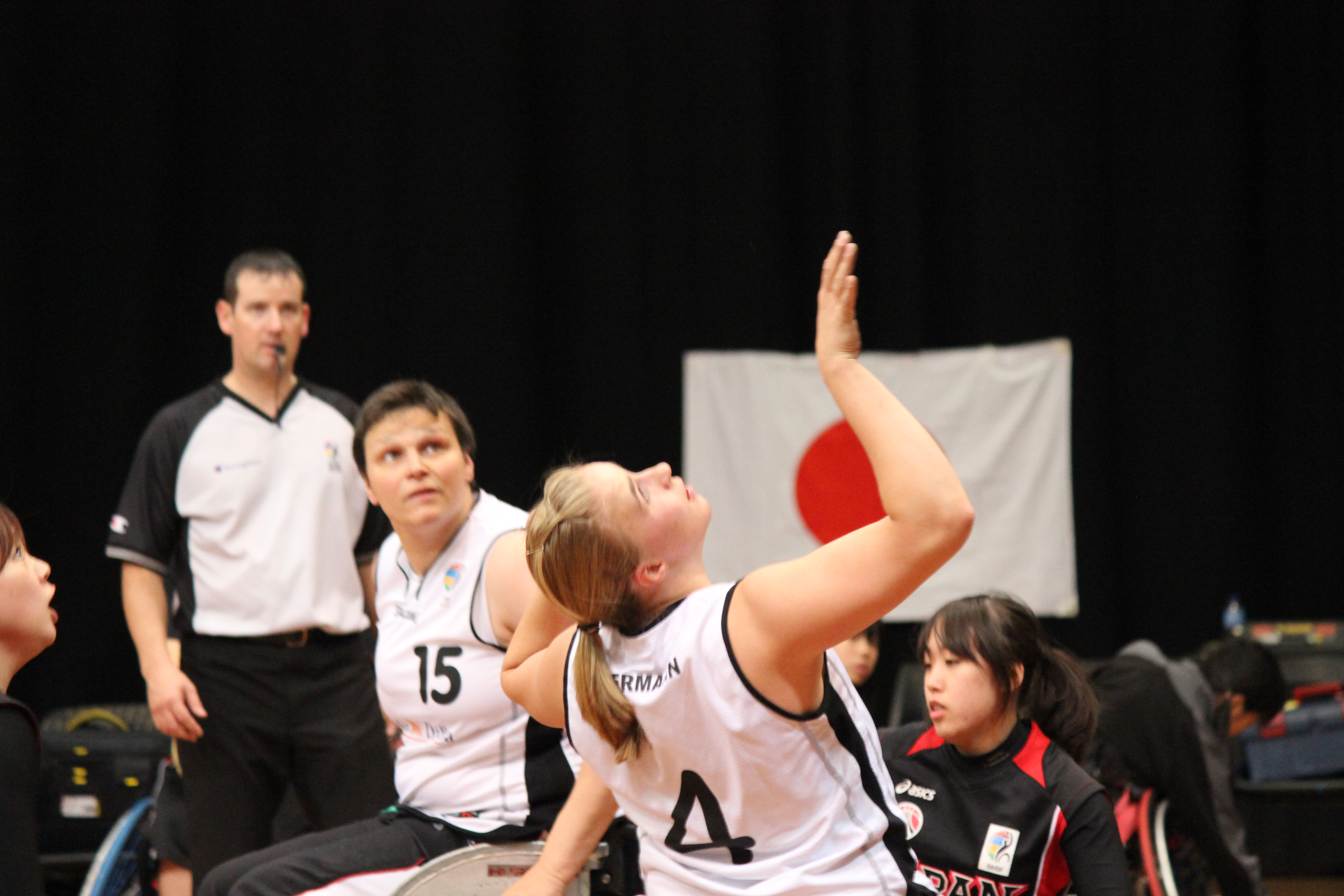

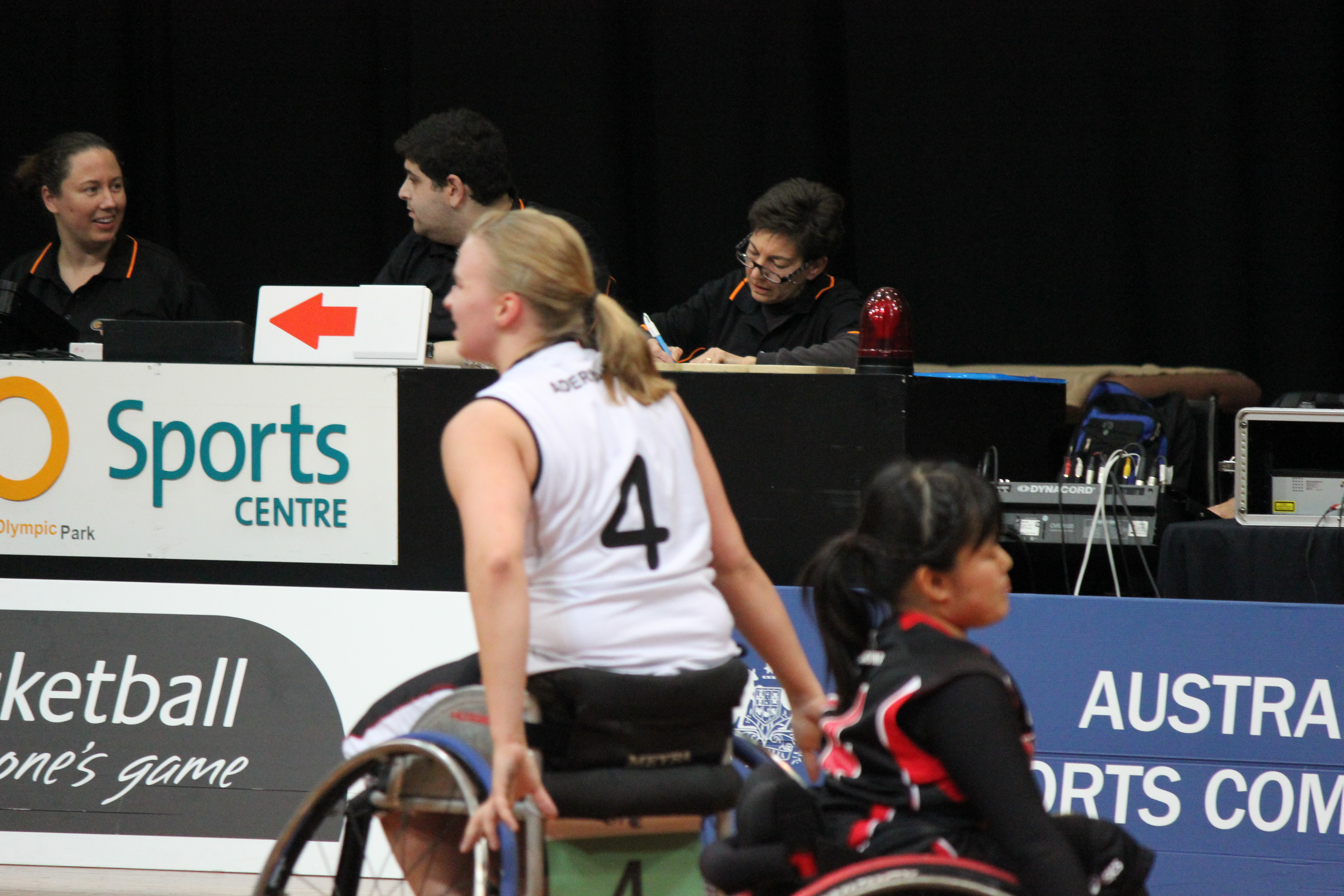
