= 2014 Women's World Wheelchair Basketball Championship squads =

The following is the list of squads for each of the 12 women's teams competing in the 2014 Women's World Wheelchair Basketball Championship, held in Toronto, Ontario, Canada between 20 and 28 June 2014. Each team selected a squad of 12 players for the tournament.

Athletes are given an eight-level score specific to wheelchair basketball, ranging from 0.5 to 4.5. Lower scores represent a higher degree of disability. The sum score of all players on the court for one team cannot exceed 14.

== Group A ==
=== Australia ===
Head coach: Tom Kyle
Assistant coaches: David Gould and Troy Sachs

#	Name	Class.
4	Sarah Vinci	1.0
5	Cobi Crispin	4.0
6	Bridie Kean	4.0
7	Shelley Cronau	3.0
8	Stephanie van Leeuwen	1.0
9	Leanne Del Toso	3.5
10	Clare Nott	1.0
11	Kylie Gauci	2.0
12	Shelley Chaplin	3.5
13	Sarah Stewart	3.0
14	Kathleen O'Kelly-Kennedy	4.0
15	Amber Merritt	4.5

=== Netherlands ===
Head coach: Gertjan van der Linden
Assistant coach: Irene Sloof

#	Name	Class.
4	Inge Huitzing	4.5
5	Lucie Houwen	3.0
6	Jitske Visser	1.0
7	Roos Oosterbaam	1.5
8	Sanne Timmerman	4.5
9	Bo Kramer	4.5
10	Wendy van der Wal	4.0
11	Cher Korver	2.5
12	Saskia Pronk	1.0
13	Barbara van Bergen	2.0
14	Carina de Rooij	3.0
15	Mariska Beijer	4.0

=== France ===
Head coach: Pascal Montet
Assistant Coach: Carolina Vincenzoni

#	Name	Class.
4	Sandrella Awad	1.0
5	Oumy Fall	2.5
6	Perrine Coste	1.0
7	Agnieszka Glemp-Etavard	1.0
8	Juliette Watine	2.0
9	Fabinenne Saint Omer-Delepine	4.5
10	Kathy Laurent	4.5
11	Emilie Menard	2.5
12	Gaëlle Bessiere	3.5
13	Florernce Doumesche-Guedoun	1.0
14	Marianne Buso	4.5
15	Agélique Pichon	4.5

=== Peru ===
Head coach: Luis Eduardo Ovalle

#	Name	Class.
4	Karina Torres	3.5
5	Yeny Robles	2.5
6	Edith Velasquez	1.0
7	Julia Zegarra	2.5
8	Monica Oroza	1.0
9	Maria Medina	3.5
10	Carmen Oblitas	3.0
11	Marleni Tunqui	4.0
12	Norma Garcia	2.0
13	Pilar Jauregui	4.0
14	Susy Achahui	1.0
15	Ingrid Sanabria	4.5

=== Mexico ===
Head coach: Aaron Davila

#	Name	Class.
4	Cecilia Vasquez	2.5
5	Isabel Lopez	4.5
6	Rocio Torres	3.5
7	Floralia Estrada	4.0
9	Lucia Vazquez	4.0
10	Guadalupe Echeverria	1.5
11	Claudia de la Torre	1.0
12	Felicitas Ramirez	3.0
13	Julieta Hernandez	4.0
14	Rocio Vera	2.0
15	Rosario Ventura	4.0

=== United States ===
Head coach: Stephanie Wheeler
Assistant coach: Trooper Johnson

#	Name	Class.
4	Megan Blunk	3.0
5	Darlene Hunter	1.5
6	Jennifer Chew	1.5
7	Mackenzie Soldan	4.0
8	Kimberley Champion	4.5
9	Desiree Miller	3.5
10	Jennifer Poist	2.0
11	Kendra Zeman	4.5
12	Rebecca Murray	2.5
13	Courtney Ryan	2.0
14	Gail Gaeng	1.0
15	Riose Hollermann	4.0

== Group B ==
=== Brazil ===
Head coach: Tiago Costa Baptista

#	Name	Class.
4	Ivanilde Candida da Silva	3.0
5	Andreia Cristina Santa Rosa Farias	1.0
6	Monica Fernanda de Andrade Santos Silva	4.5
7	Lucicleia da Costa Costa	2.5
8	Rosalia Ramos da Silva	1.5
9	Perla Dos Santos Assunção	2.0
10	Jessica da Silva Santana	2.5
11	Geisa Rodrigues Viera	4.0
12	Lia Maria Soares Martins	4.5
13	Cintia Mariana Lopes Carvalho	1.0
14	Paola Klokler	4.0
15	Viliede Brito de Almeida	4.5

=== Germany ===
Head coach: Holger Glinicki

#	Name	Class.
4	Mareike Adermann	4.5
5	Johanna Welin	2.0
6	Simone Kues	1.0
7	Edina Müller	2.5
8	Annika Zeyen	1.5
9	Laura Fürst	2.0
10	Gesche Schünemann	4.5
11	Maya Lindholm	2.5
12	Annabel Breuer	1.5
13	Annegret Briessmann	1.0
14	Marina Mohnen	4.5
15	Linda Dahle	4.5

=== Canada ===
Head coach: Bill Johnson
Assistant coaches: Michael Broughton and Michele Hynes

#	Name	Class.
4	Elaine Allard	1.5
5	Janet McLachlan	4.5
6	Arinn Young	4.5
7	Cindy Ouellet	3.5
8	Tamara Steeves	1.5
9	Maude Jacques	2.5
10	Katie Harnock	2.0
11	Darda Sales	4.0
12	Tracey Ferguson	3.0
13	Jamey Jewells	1.0
14	Amanda Yan	3.0
15	Melanie Hawtin	1.5

=== Great Britain ===
Head coach: Miles Thompson
Assistant coach: Matthew Foden

#	Name	Class.
4	Charlotte Moore	1.0
5	Sophie Carrigill	1.0
6	Clare Griffiths	1.5
7	Helen Freeman	4.0
8	Laurie Williams	2.5
9	Judith Hamer	4.0
10	Amy Conroy	4.0
11	Madeleine Thompson	4.5
12	Helen Turner	3.5
13	Louise Sugden	2.0
14	Joy Haizelden	2.5
15	Fiona Tillman	1.0

=== China ===
Head coach: Tiehua Liu

#	Name	Class.
4	Haizhen Cheng	4.5
5	San Yang	4.0
6	Xiaoyan Wang	4.0
7	Yongqing Fu	4.0
8	Man Liu	1.0
9	Suiling Lin	3.0
10	Jiameng Dai
11	Ting Ting Xu
12	Mingzhu DEng	2.0
13	Yanhua Li	1.5
14	Yon Long	1.0
15	Donghuai Zheng	2.5

=== Japan ===
Head coach: Kaori Tachibana

#	Name	Class.
4	Erika Yoshida	1.0
5	Miki Uramoto	2.5
6	Kyoko Miura	4.5
7	Megumi Mashiko	3.0
8	Tomoe Soeda	3.5
9	Mayumi Tsuchida	4.5
10	Mayo Hagino	1.0
11	Izumi Zaima	1.0
12	Miho Arikawa	2.5
13	Chihiro Kitada	4.5
14	Yui Kitama	1.0
15	Mari Amimoto	4.5

== See also ==
- 2014 FIBA World Championship for Women squads
