= Wheelchair basketball at the 2008 Summer Paralympics – Women's team rosters =

This is a list of players that participated in the women's wheelchair basketball competition at the 2008 Summer Paralympics. The venue for the event was the National Stadium.

== Group A ==
=== Australia ===
Name
Cobi Crispin
Melanie Domaschenz
Bridie Kean
Tina McKenzie
Clare Burzynski
Melanie Hall
Katie Hill
Kathleen O'Kelly-Kennedy
Shelley Chaplin
Sarah Stewart
Kylie Gauci
Liesl Tesch

=== Brazil ===
Name
Debora Costa
Ozineide Pantoja
Helena Ferrao
Vileide Almeida
Elizabeth Gomes
Rosalia Silva Ramos
Andreia Cristina Farias
Monica Andrade Santos
Cleonete Reis
Naildes Mafra
Lia Soares Martins
Jucilene Moraes

=== Germany ===
Name
Birgit Meitner
Edina Anita Muller
Nora Schratz
Britta Kautz
Alke Behrens
Nicole Seifert
Gesche Schunemann
Simone Kues
Annette Kahl
Annika Zeyen
Maren Butterbrodt
Marina Mohnen

=== Great Britain ===
Name
Ann Wild
Pauline McDonald
Jill Fox
Joanne Harper
Paula Johnson
Caroline Matthews
Louise Sugden
Helen Freeman
Helen Turner
Caroline MacLean
Clare Strange
Sally Wager

=== United States ===
Name
Emily Hoskins
Patty Cisneros
Alana Nichols
Rebecca Murray
Natalie Schneider
Sarah Castle
Carlee Hoffman
Loraine Gonzales
Stephanie Wheeler
Christina Ripp
Jen Ruddell
Mary Allison Milford

== Group B ==
=== Canada ===
The following is the Canada roster in the women's wheelchair basketball tournament of the 2012 Summer Paralympics.

Canada women's national wheelchair basketball team-2012 Summer Paralympics roster
Players
Coaches

No.	Name	Age – Date of birth	Pts.	Club	Ctr.
4	Jennifer Krempien	33 – 19 February 1975	1.0	Edmonton Inferno	(Canada)
5	Janet McLachlan	31 – 26 August 1977	4.5	BC Breakers	(Canada)
6	Kendra Ohama	43 – 1 June 1965	2.5	Calgary Rollers	(Canada)
7	Cindy Ouellet	19 – 8 December 1988	3.5	Quebec Bulldogs	(Canada)
8	Tracey Ferguson	34 – 7 September 1974	3.0	Variety Village	(Canada)
9	Chantal Benoit	47 – 1 October 1960	3.5	C.I.V.A. Quebec	(Canada)
10	Katie Harnock	25 – 12 August 1983	2.0	University of Alabama	(United States)
11	Sabrina Pettinicchi	30 – 9 June 1978	1.5	A.L. Gullison Allcourts	(Canada)
12	Lisa Franks	26 – 6 April 1982	1.0	'99 - Saskatoon	(Canada)
13	Lori Radka	42 – 27 February 1966	4.5	Calgary Rollers	(Canada)
14	Misty Thomas	44 – 1 July 1964	4.5	BC Breakers	(Canada)
15	Tara Feser	28 – 2 February 1980	4.5	Edmonton Inferno	(Canada)

Head coach

- Tim Frick

Assistant coach(es)

- Darrell Nordell
- Paul Bowes
- Jaimie Peers
- Age - describes age on 7 September 2008

=== China ===
Name
Mihuan Liu
Qiuping Cao
Santao Zhang
Wenhua Hao
Yongqing Fu
Li Gu
Yanhua Li
Qiurong Chen
Fengling Peng
Damei Chen
Donghuai Zheng
Chao Yang

=== Japan ===
Name
Tomoe Soeda
Miki Uramoto
Naoko Sugahara
Rie Kawakami
Tomomi Kosuzuki
Kimi Taneda
Erika Yoshida
Yuka Betto
Mika Takabayashi
Megumi Mashiko
Ikumi Takubo
Mari Amimoto

=== Mexico ===
Name
Alma Torres Rodriguez
Rosa Camara Arango
Rosa Herlinda Vera
Patricia Rodriguez Velazquez
Anaisa Perez Pacheco
Cecilia Vazquez Suarez
Rocio Torres Lopez
Rubicela Guzman Acosta
Claudia Magali Miranda
Floralia Estrada
Wendy Garcia Amador
Lucia Vazquez Delgadillo

=== Netherlands ===
Name
Jitske Visser
Patries Boekhoorn
Fleur Pieterse
Sandra Braam
Brenda Ramaekers
Barbara van Bergen
Petra Garnier
Elsbeth van Oostrom
Inge Huitzing
Cher Korver
Roos Oosterbaan
Carina Versloot
