= Wheelchair basketball at the 2012 Summer Paralympics – Women's tournament =

Women's wheelchair basketball at the XIV Paralympic Games
- Venue: Basketball Arena, North Greenwich Arena
- Dates: 30 August – 7 September 2012
- Competitors: 10 teams from 10 nations

Medalists
1st place, gold medalist(s)		Germany (GER) (3rd title)
2nd place, silver medalist(s)		Australia (AUS)
3rd place, bronze medalist(s)		Netherlands (NED)

The women's tournament in wheelchair basketball at the 2012 Summer Paralympics was held from 30 August to 7 September. Competitions were held at the newly built Basketball Arena, which seated 10,000 spectators, and North Greenwich Arena (The O2 Arena renamed during the Games because of a no-commercialisation policy on arena names).

33 matches were played, 20 in the preliminary round, and 13 in the classification and medal rounds.

Germany beat Australia in the final, while the Netherlands beat defending champions United States in the match for the bronze medal.

== Calendar ==
August September	30 – 3	4	5	6	7
Stage	Group stage	Quarter-finals; Match 9/10	None	Semi-finals; Semi-finals 5–8	Final; Bronze; Match 5/6; Match 7/8

== Group stage ==
=== Group A ===
Team	Pld	W	L	PF	PA	PD	Pts	Qualification
Australia	4	3	1	211	180	+31	7 (Note: head-to-head score differential: AUS: +2; NED: +2; CAN: −4) (Note: Netherlands and Australia have the same score difference but Australia won the match from the Netherlands (58–49))	Quarter-finals
Netherlands	4	3	1	236	194	+42	7	Quarter-finals
Canada	4	3	1	248	231	+17	7	Quarter-finals
Great Britain	4	1	3	151	217	−66	5	Quarter-finals
Brazil	4	0	4	190	214	−24	4	Eliminated

Rules for classification: 1) Table points, 2) Head-to-head score differential
Notes:

30 August 2012
13:00

Report

Netherlands	62–35	Great Britain
Scoring by quarter: 8–8, 12–6, 18–10, 24–11
Pts: Bejer 26; Rebs: Bejer 19; Asts: Huitzing 9		Pts: Conroy 15; Rebs: Freeman 12; Asts: Freeman 6

North Greenwich Arena, London
Referees: Max Kindervater (GER)

30 August 2012
18:30

Report

Australia	52–50	Brazil
Scoring by quarter: 14–12, 11–13, 14–12, 13–13
Pts: Crispin 18; Rebs: Merritt 10; Asts: three players 3		Pts: Soares Martins 27; Rebs: Soares Martins 14; Asts: Guimarrães da Costa 12

Basketball Arena, London
Referees: Linas Radykas (LTU)

31 August 2012
13:00

Report

Great Britain	24–51	Australia
Scoring by quarter: 5–11, 6–14, 3–14, 10–12
Pts: Hamer 8 Rebs: Strange 7 Asts: three players 2		Pts: Merritt 10; Rebs: Crispin 7 Asts: Gauci 4

North Greenwich Arena, London
Referees: Nureddin Bilmez (TUR)

31 August 2012
19:00

Report

Canada	59–70	Netherlands
Scoring by quarter: 10–25, 17–9, 16–19, 16–17
Pts: McLachlan 26; Rebs: McLachlan 15; Asts: Harnock, Ferguson 5		Pts: Bejer 34; Rebs: Bejer 14; Asts: Huitzing 11

North Greenwich Arena, London
Referees: Adam Fronczak (POL)

1 September 2012
13:00

Report

Brazil	37–42	Great Britain
Scoring by quarter: 5–9, 16–10, 10–8, 6–15
Pts: Guimarães da Costa 16; Rebs: De Nazaré Santos 11; Asts: Guimarães da Costa 3		Pts: Conroy 18; Rebs: Freeman 8 Asts: Freeman 11

Basketball Arena, London
Referees: Saskia Warmerdam (NED)

1 September 2012
18:30

Report

Australia	50–57	Canada
Scoring by quarter: 12–20, 20–13, 8–10, 10–14
Pts: Merritt 16; Rebs: Crispin 15; Asts: Chaplin 7		Pts: McLachlan 28; Rebs: McLachlan 21; Asts: Ouellet 9

Basketball Arena, London
Referees: Karen Molina (COL)

2 September 2012
15:15

Report

Canada	65–61	Brazil
Scoring by quarter: 17–13, 14–10, 16–16, 18–12
Pts: McLachlan 36; Rebs: Ouellet 8 Asts: McLachlan 23		Pts: Soares Martins 26; Rebs: Soares Martins 11; Asts: Guimarães da Costa 7

North Greenwich Arena, London
Referees: Carsten Rehling (GER)

2 September 2012
21:15

Report

Netherlands	49–58	Australia
Scoring by quarter: 12–18, 8–12, 9–10, 20–18
Pts: Huitzing 14; Rebs: Huitzing 8 Asts: Huitzing 7		Pts: Merritt 19; Rebs: Crispin 7 Asts: Chaplin 7

North Greenwich Arena, London
Referees: Darrell Hargreaves (USA)

3 September 2012
13:00

Report

Great Britain	50–67	Canada
Scoring by quarter: 16–14, 9–20, 11–21, 14–12
Pts: Freeman 18; Rebs: Freeman, Conroy 7 Asts: Freeman 5		Pts: Harnock 20; Rebs: McLachlan 15; Asts: Ouellet, Ferguson 8

North Greenwich Arena, London
Referees: Valerie Farrugia (FRA)

3 September 2012
18:30

Report

Brazil	42–55	Netherlands
Scoring by quarter: 12–19, 12–9, 10–20, 8–7
Pts: Soares Martins 28; Rebs: Soares Martins 14; Asts: Guimarães da Costa 6		Pts: Beijer 27; Rebs: Beijer 12; Asts: Huitzing 7

Basketball Arena, London
Referees: Eisuke Kano (JPN)

=== Group B ===
Team	Pld	W	L	PF	PA	PD	Pts	Qualification
Germany	4	4	0	254	158	+96	8	Quarter-finals
United States	4	3	1	246	176	+70	7	Quarter-finals
China	4	2	2	240	204	+36	6	Quarter-finals
Mexico	4	1	3	157	230	−73	5	Quarter-finals
France	4	0	4	132	261	−129	4	Eliminated

30 August 2012
15:15

Report

United States	63–24	France
Scoring by quarter: 20–4, 21–4, 14–10, 8–6
Pts: Murray 23; Rebs: Nichols 6 Asts: Nichols 5		Pts: Quemener-Pichon 7 Rebs: Belz 9 Asts: Glemp-Etavard, Mathias 2

North Greenwich Arena, London
Referees: Carsten Rehling (GER)

30 August 2012
21:15

Report

Mexico	46–53	China
Scoring by quarter: 21–11, 9–11, 11–13, 5–18
Pts: Estrada Bernal 18; Rebs: Estrada Bernal 14; Asts: Estrada Bernal 4		Pts: Cheng 19; Rebs: Cheng 13; Asts: Zhang 3

North Greenwich Arena, London
Referees: Ian Pursglove (GBR)

31 August 2012
13:00

Report

Germany	54–48	United States
Scoring by quarter: 13–17, 10–6, 10–13, 21–12
Pts: Mohnen 15; Rebs: Mohnen 10; Asts: Mohnen 7		Pts: Schneider, Miller 12; Rebs: Schneider 8 Asts: Murray 7

Basketball Arena, London
Referees: Valerie Farrugia (FRA)

31 August 2012
20:45

Report

China	72–34	France
Scoring by quarter: 21–6, 20–8, 13–12, 18–8
Pts: Cheng 20; Rebs: Cheng 10; Asts: Long 6		Pts: Saint-Omer-Delépine 13; Rebs: Saint-Omer-Delépine 6 Asts: Glemp-Etavard 4

Basketball Arena, London
Referees: Darrell Hargreaves (USA)

1 September 2012
10:45

Report

United States	67–33	Mexico
Scoring by quarter: 22–9, 10–9, 14–6, 21–9
Pts: Murray 22; Rebs: Murray 7 Asts: Murray 6		Pts: Estrada Bernal 10; Rebs: Estrada Bernal 10; Asts: Estrada Bernal 4

North Greenwich Arena, London
Referees: Eisuke Kanno (JPN)

1 September 2012
15:15

Report

France	32–76	Germany
Scoring by quarter: 14–20, 8–15, 5–19, 5–22
Pts: Quemener-Pichon 12; Rebs: Saint-Omer Delépine 12; Asts: Ménard 3		Pts: Mohnen 23; Rebs: Friedrich 6 Asts: Zeyen 8

North Greenwich Arena, London
Referees: Stacy Gomm (RSA)

2 September 2012
10:45

Report

Germany	56–50	China
Scoring by quarter: 13–17, 17–7, 20–11, 6–15
Pts: Schünemann 23; Rebs: Schünemann 12; Asts: Schünemann 6		Pts: Long 16; Rebs: Cheng 7 Asts: Long, Peng 4

Basketball Arena, London
Referees: Linas Radykas (LTU)

2 September 2012
13:00

Report

Mexico	50–42	France
Scoring by quarter: 13–12, 13–8, 11–6, 13–16
Pts: Vázquez Delgadillo 18; Rebs: Estrada Bernal 13; Asts: Pérez Pacheco 8		Pts: Quemener-Pichon 22; Rebs: Saint-Omer-Delépine 8 Asts: Glemp-Etavard 7

North Greenwich Arena, London
Referees: Philip Haines (AUS)

3 September 2012
10:45

Report

Mexico	28–68	Germany
Scoring by quarter: 5–10, 14–24, 5–19, 4–15
Pts: Estrada Bernal 12; Rebs: Pérez Pacheco 3 Asts: Estrada Bernal 10		Pts: Adermann 18; Rebs: Adermann 10; Asts: Müller 6

Basketball Arena, London
Referees: Shu Fei Hsieh (TPE)

3 September 2012
13:00

Report

China	65–68 (OT)	United States
Scoring by quarter: 17–11, 11–12, 18–12, 15–26, Overtime: 4–7
Pts: Cheng 22; Rebs: Fu 13; Asts: Long 5		Pts: Murray 30; Rebs: Murray 14; Asts: Murray 8

Basketball Arena, London
Referees: Cristian Roja (ITA)

== Second round ==
=== 9th/10th place match ===
4 September 2012
10:45

Report

Brazil	59–35	France
Scoring by quarter: 17–10, 14–4, 15–8, 13–13
Pts: Soares Martins 45; Rebs: Guimarães Da Costa 13; Asts: Soares Martins 10		Pts: Belz, Quemener-Pichon 8 Rebs: Saint-Omer-Delépine 10; Asts: Saint-Omer-Delépine 4

North Greenwich Arena, London
Referees: Juan Uruñuela (ESP)

=== Quarter-finals ===
4 September 2012
13:00

Report

Australia	62–37	Mexico
Scoring by quarter: 21–10, 23–10, 6–9, 12–8
Pts: Merritt 14; Rebs: Kean 5 Asts: Gauci 7		Pts: Estrada Bernal 11; Rebs: Estrada Bernal 4 Asts: Estrada Bernal 16

North Greenwich Arena, London
Referees: Valerie Farrugia (FRA)

4 September 2012
15:15

Report

Netherlands	59–37	China
Scoring by quarter: 13–6, 8–13, 18–10, 20–8
Pts: Beijer 29; Rebs: Beijer 14; Asts: Huitzing 9		Pts: Fu 18; Rebs: Long 6 Asts: Fu 12

North Greenwich Arena, London
Referees: Mati Quintana (ARG)

4 September 2012
19:00

Report

Germany	55–44	Great Britain
Scoring by quarter: 8–12, 14–9, 12–12, 21–11
Pts: Zeyen 25; Rebs: Schünemann 5 Asts: Schünemann 14		Pts: Freeman 19; Rebs: Sugden 7 Asts: Freeman 8

North Greenwich Arena, London
Referees: Sébastien Gauthier (CAN)

4 September 2012
21:15

Report

United States	67–55	Canada
Scoring by quarter: 10–21, 19–12, 16–8, 22–14
Pts: Miller 26; Rebs: Murray 11; Asts: Murray 10		Pts: McLachlan 31; Rebs: McLachlan 13; Asts: Ouellet 6

North Greenwich Arena, London
Referees: Cristian Salguero (ARG)

== Classification round ==
5th–8th place semi-finals
Canada	74
Mexico	53
China	72
Great Britain	55

5th/6th place match
Canada	70
China	73
7th/8th place match
Mexico	37
Great Britain	59

=== 5th–8th place semi-finals ===
6 September 2012
8:30

Report

Canada	74–53	Mexico
Scoring by quarter: 30–4, 12–20, 18–12, 14–17
Pts: McLachlan 24; Rebs: McLachlan 13; Asts: Ouellet 10		Pts: Estrada Bernal 15; Rebs: Estrada Bernal 12; Asts: Vázquez Delgadillo 6

North Greenwich Arena, London
Referees: Philip Haines (AUS)

6 September 2012
10:45

Report

China	72–55	Great Britain
Scoring by quarter: 17–10, 17–10, 15–11, 23–24
Pts: Cheng 19; Rebs: Cheng 14; Asts: Long 10		Pts: Freeman 22; Rebs: Freeman 9 Asts: Freeman 9

North Greenwich Arena, London
Referees: Matt Wells (AUS)

=== 7th/8th place match ===
7 September 2012
8:30

Report

Mexico	37–59	Great Britain
Scoring by quarter: 11–6, 8–12, 7–22, 11–19
Pts: Estrada Bernal, Pérez Pacheco 9 Rebs: Pérez Pacheco 4 Asts: Estrada Bernal 6		Pts: Conroy 22; Rebs: Freeman 9 Asts: Freeman 9

North Greenwich Arena, London
Referees: Matt Wells (AUS)

=== 5th/6th place match ===
7 September 2012
10:45

Report

Canada	70–73	China
Scoring by quarter: 17–15, 12–14, 13–18, 28–26
Pts: McLachlan 22; Rebs: McLachlan 17; Asts: Harnock 7		Pts: Fu 25; Rebs: Cheng 10; Asts: Long 9

North Greenwich Arena, London
Referees: Max Kindervater (GER)

== Medal round ==
Quarter-finals
Australia	62
Mexico	37
United States	67
Canada	55
Netherlands	59
China	37
Germany	55
Great Britain	44

Semi-finals
Australia	40
United States	39
Netherlands	46
Germany	49

Final
Australia	44
Germany	58
Third place
United States	47
Netherlands	71

=== Semi-finals ===
6 September 2012
13:00

Report

Australia	40–39	United States
Scoring by quarter: 10–12, 16–14, 12–2, 2–11
Pts: three players 8 Rebs: Merritt 6 Asts: three players 3		Pts: Murray 18; Rebs: Murray, Schneider 9 Asts: Murray 3

North Greenwich Arena, London
Referees: Sébastien Gauthier (CAN)

6 September 2012
15:15

Report

Netherlands	46–49	Germany
Scoring by quarter: 8–12, 21–12, 8–12, 9–13
Pts: Huitzing 16; Rebs: Huitzing, Beijer 12; Asts: Huitzing 8		Pts: Mohnen 20; Rebs: Schünemann 8 Asts: Zeyen 6

North Greenwich Arena, London
Referees: Juan Uruñuela (ESP)

=== Bronze medal match ===
7 September 2012
19:00

Report

United States	47–71	Netherlands
Scoring by quarter: 16–16, 8–22, 13–22, 10–11
Pts: Murray 19; Rebs: Murray 6 Asts: Murray 4		Pts: Beijer 27; Rebs: Beijer 9 Asts: Huitzing 11

North Greenwich Arena, London
Referees: Rui Marques (BRA)

=== Gold medal match ===
7 September 2012
21:15

Report

Australia	44–58	Germany
Scoring by quarter: 10–14, 9–12, 9–8, 16–24
Pts: Gauci 15; Rebs: Gauci, Merritt 5 Asts: Crispin, Chaplin 5		Pts: Adermann 19; Rebs: Mohnen 9 Asts: Adermann, Zeyen 5

North Greenwich Arena, London
Referees: Sergio Giordano (CAN)

== Ranking ==
Place	Team
1st place, gold medalist(s)	Germany
2nd place, silver medalist(s)	Australia
3rd place, bronze medalist(s)	Netherlands
4.	United States
5.	China
6.	Canada
7.	Great Britain
8.	Mexico
9.	Brazil
10.	France

== See also ==
- Wheelchair basketball at the 2012 Summer Paralympics – Men

== Sources ==
- "London 2012 Paralympic Game, Wheelchair Basketball: Women". Official Website of the Paralympic Movement. 2012.
- "Schedule and Results - Wheelchair Basketball". The London Organizing Committee for the Games of the XXX Olympiad. 2012. Archived from the original on 2012-09-03.
