= Wheelchair basketball at the 2012 Summer Paralympics =

Wheelchair basketball at the XIV Paralympic Games
- Venue: Basketball Arena, North Greenwich Arena
- Dates: 30 August – 8 September 2012
- Competitors: 264 (12 men and 10 women teams)

Medalists
1st place, gold medalist(s)		Canada (CAN) (men); Germany (GER) (women)
2nd place, silver medalist(s)		Australia (AUS) (men); Australia (AUS) (women)
3rd place, bronze medalist(s)		United States (USA) (men); Netherlands (NED) (women)

Wheelchair basketball at the 2012 Summer Paralympics was held from 30 August to 8 September. Competitions were held at the newly built Basketball Arena, which seated 10,000 spectators, and The O2 Arena (renamed "North Greenwich Arena" during the games due to sponsorship rules). Australia were the defending champions of the men's championship, while the United States were the defending champions of the women's championship.

== Competition format ==
In the men's tournament, twelve qualified nations were drawn into two groups, each consisting of six teams, where each team met the other teams once. The four highest placed teams in each group then advanced to a knock-out round to decide the medals and 4th to 8th places. The fifth-placed teams met each other over the 9th and 10th places, and the sixth-placed teams met each other over the 11th and 12th places.

In the women's tournament, ten qualified nations were drawn into two groups, each consisting of five teams, where each team met the other teams once. The four highest placed teams in each group then advanced to a knock-out round to decide the medals and 4th to 8th places. The fifth-placed teams met each other over the 9th and 10th places.

== Athlete classification ==
Athletes are given an eight-level score specific to wheelchair basketball, ranging from 0.5 to 4.5. Lower scores represented a higher degree of disability. The sum score of all players on the court cannot exceed 14.

== Qualification ==
The Great Britain wheelchair basketball teams received automatic qualification as hosts. An NPC may enter up to one men's team with 12 players and up to one women's team with 12 players.

=== Men ===
Means of qualification	Date	Venue	Berths	Qualified
2010 World Wheelchair Basketball Championships	5–18 July 2010	(United Kingdom) Birmingham	7	Australia; Spain; United States; Italy; Poland; Canada; Turkey
2011 IWBF Africa Championship	10–13 October 2011	(Morocco) Rabat	1	South Africa
2011 IWBF Asia-Oceania Championship	4–11 November 2011	(South Korea) Goyang	1	Japan
2011 Parapan American Games	13 September – 20 October 2011	(Mexico) Guadalajara	1	Colombia
2011 IWBF European Championship	8–17 September 2011	(Israel) Nazareth	1	Germany
Host nation			1	Great Britain
Total			12	

=== Women ===
Means of qualification	Date	Venue	Berths	Qualified
2010 IWBF Wheelchair Basketball World Championships	5–18 July 2010	(United Kingdom) Birmingham	5	United States; Germany; Canada; Australia; Netherlands
2011 IWBF Asia-Oceania Championship	4–11 November 2011	(South Korea) Goyang	1	China
2011 Parapan American Games	13 September – 20 October 2011	(Mexico) Guadalajara	1	Brazil
2011 IWBF European Championship	6–18 September 2011	(Israel) Nazareth	1	France
International play-off			1	Mexico
Host nation			1	Great Britain
Total			10	

== Medalists ==
Event	Gold	Silver	Bronze
Men's team	Canada (CAN); Dave Durepos; Yvon Rouillard; Bo Hedges; Richard Peter; Joey Johnson; Adam Lancia; Abdi Dini; Chad Jassman; Patrick Anderson; Brandon Wagner; Tyler Miller; David Eng (captain); Coach: Jerry Tonello	Australia (AUS); Justin Eveson; Bill Latham; Brett Stibners; Shaun Norris; Michael Hartnett; Tristan Knowles; Jannik Blair; Tige Simmons; Grant Mizens; Dylan Alcott; Nick Taylor; Brad Ness (captain); Coach: Ben Ettridge	United States (USA); Eric Barber; Joseph Chambers; Jeremy Lade; Joshua Turek; Trevon Jenifer; William Waller (captain); Matt Scott; Steve Serio; Jason Nelms; Ian Lynch; Paul Schulte; Nate Hinze; Coach: Jim Glatch
Women's team	Germany (GER); Mareike Adermann; Johanna Welin; Britt Dillmann; Edina Müller; Annika Zeyen; Maria Kühn; Gesche Schünemann; Maya Lindholm; Annabel Breuer; Annegret Briessmann; Marina Mohnen (captain); Heike Friedrich; Coach: Holger Glinicki	Australia (AUS); Sarah Vinci; Cobi Crispin; Bridie Kean (captain); Amanda Carter; Tina McKenzie; Leanne del Toso; Clare Nott; Kylie Gauci; Shelley Chaplin; Sarah Stewart; Katie Hill; Amber Merritt; Coach: John Triscari	Netherlands (NED); Inge Huitzing; Lucie Houwen; Jitske Visser; Roos Oosterbaan; Sanne Timmerman; Petra Garnier; Miranda Wevers; Cher Korver (captain); Saskia Pronk; Barbara van Bergen; Carolina de Rooij-Versloot; Mariska Beijer; Coach: Gertjan van der Linden

Source: Paralympic.org

== See also ==
- Basketball at the 2012 Summer Olympics
