= 2014 Women's World Wheelchair Basketball Championship =

2014 Women's World Wheelchair Basketball World Championship
- Venue: Mattamy Athletic Centre
- Location: Toronto
- Start date: 20 June 2014
- End date: 28 June 2014
- Competitors: 12 teams from 12 nations

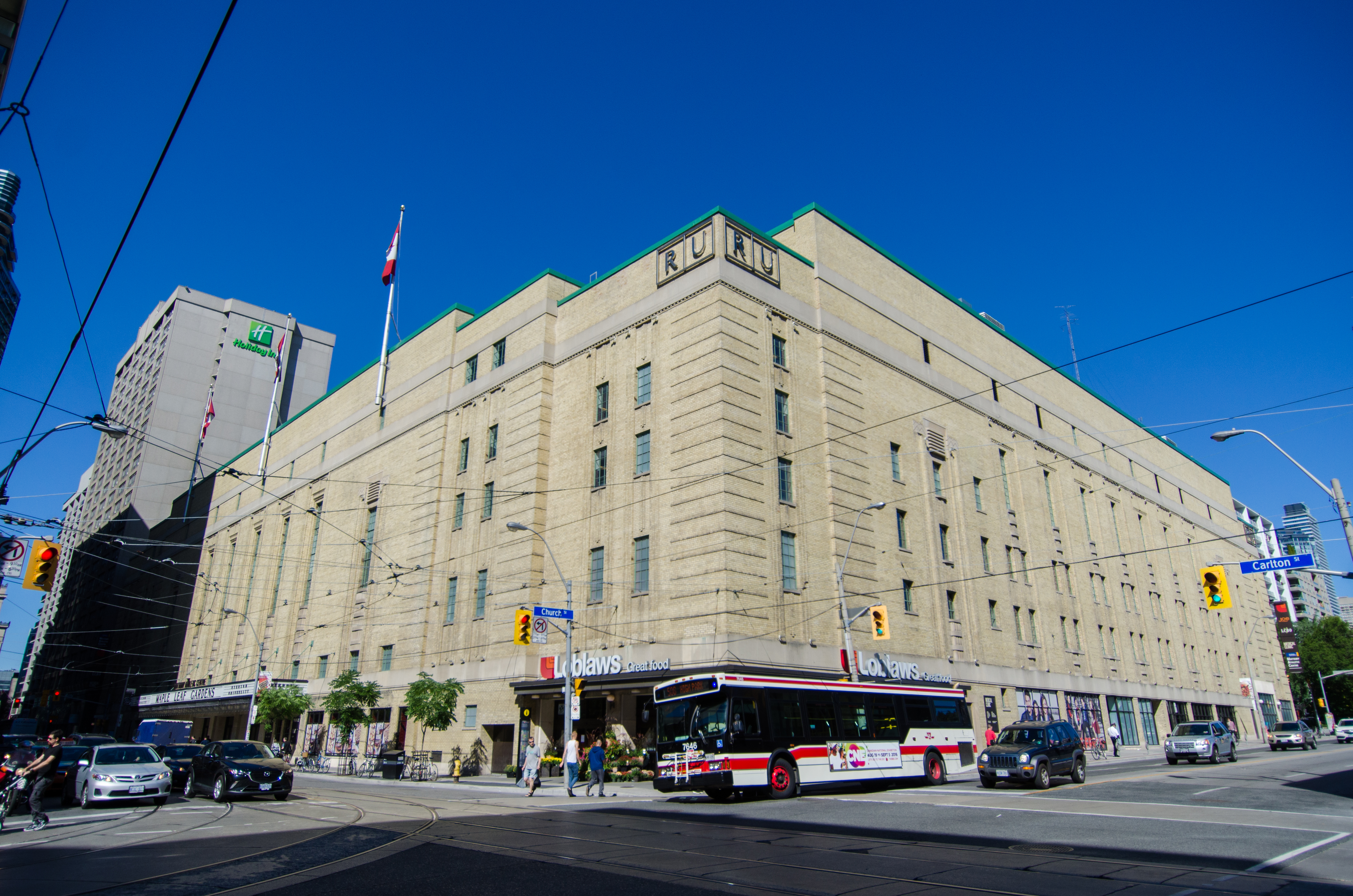
The Mattamy Athletic Centre venue

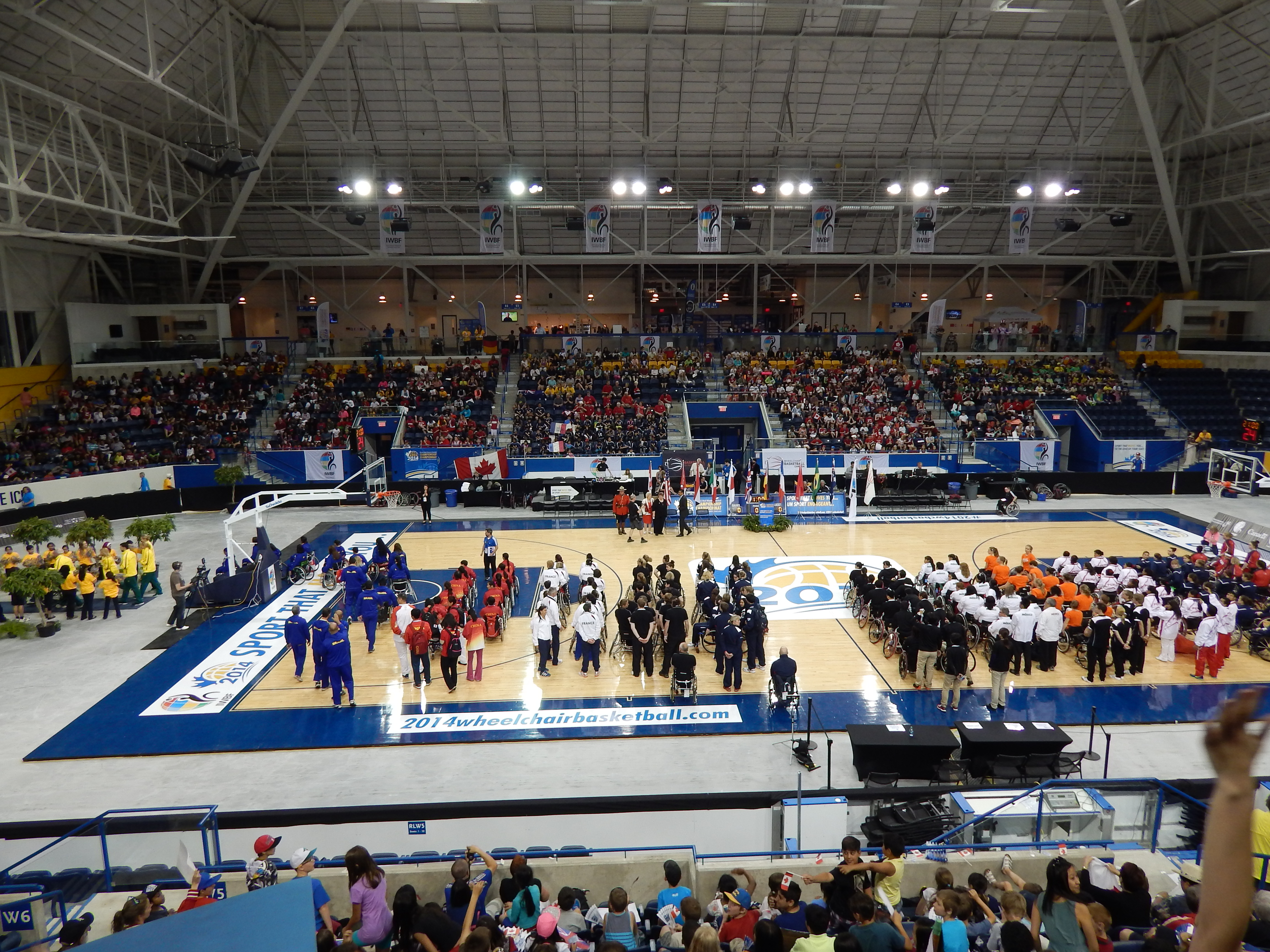
Opening Ceremony

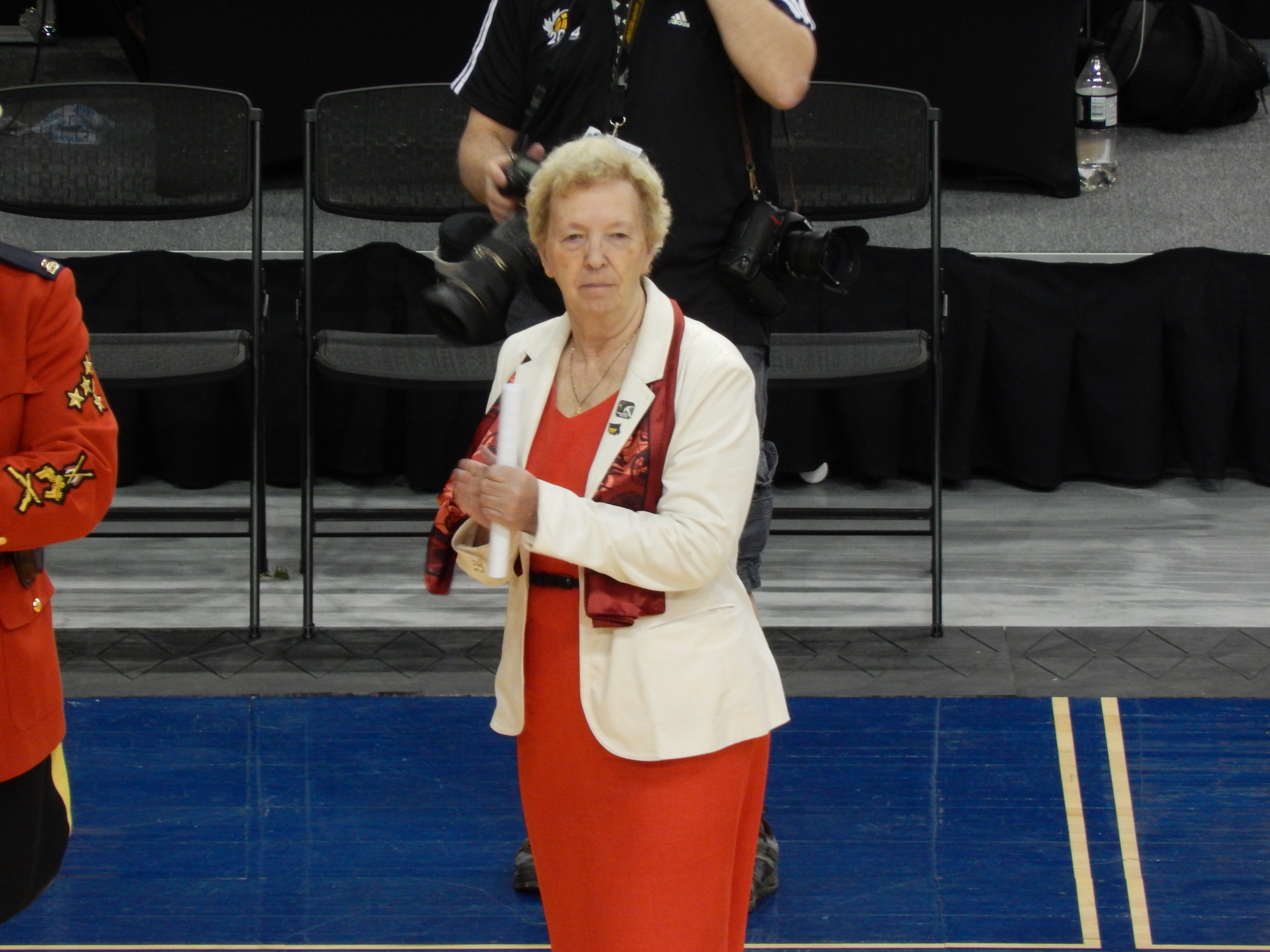
Maureen Orchard, president of the IWBF

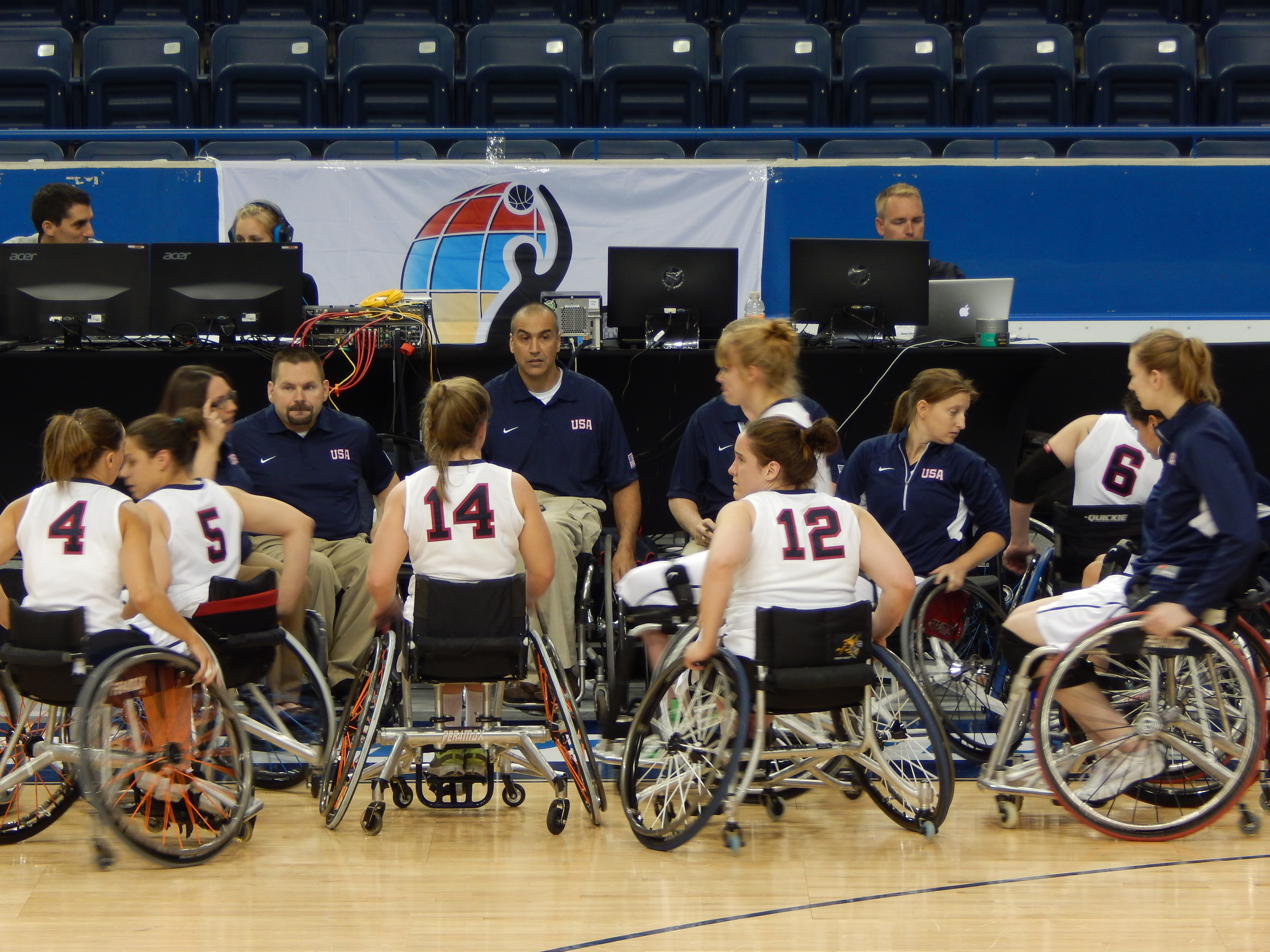
Team USA

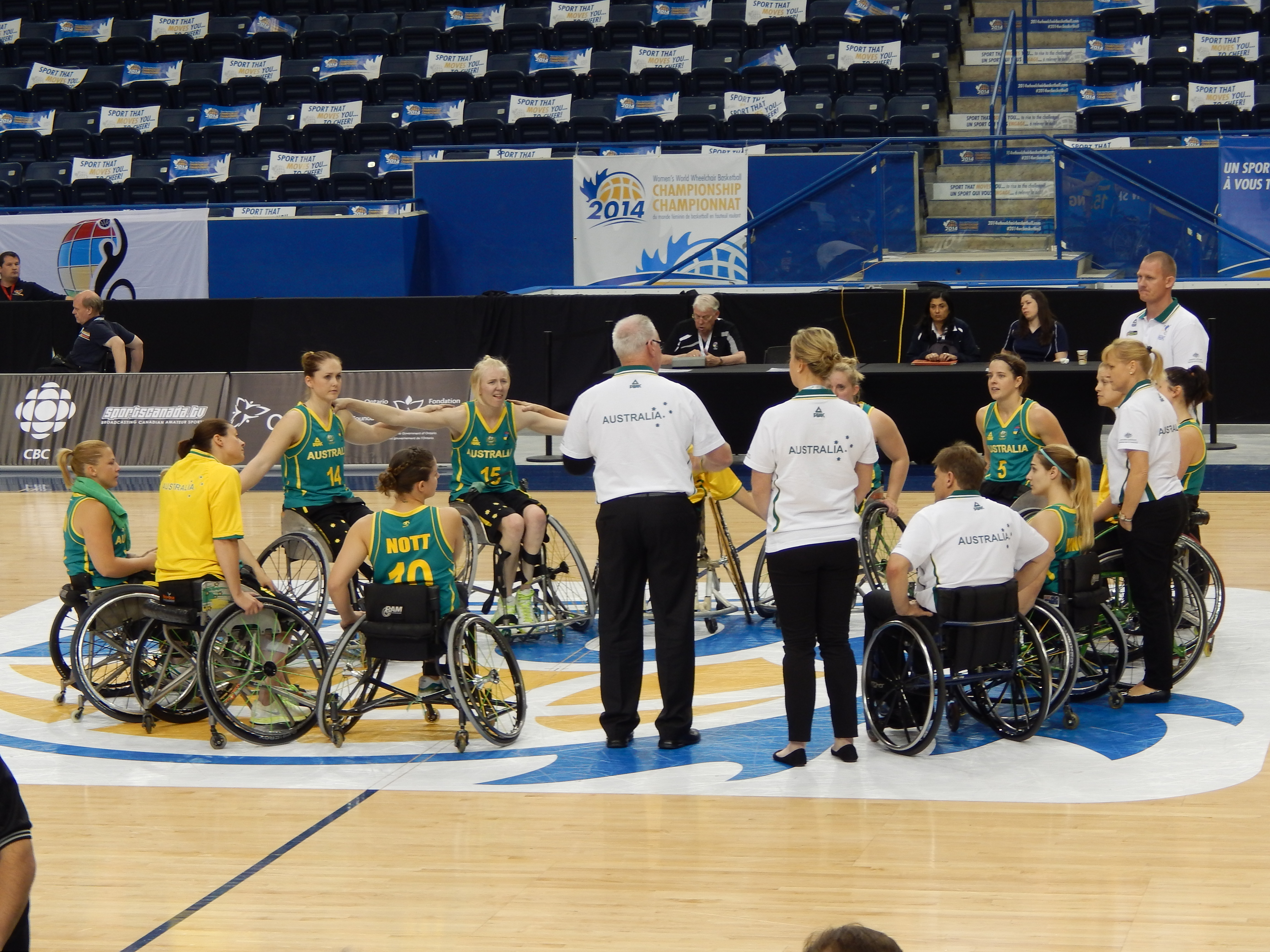
Australian Gliders

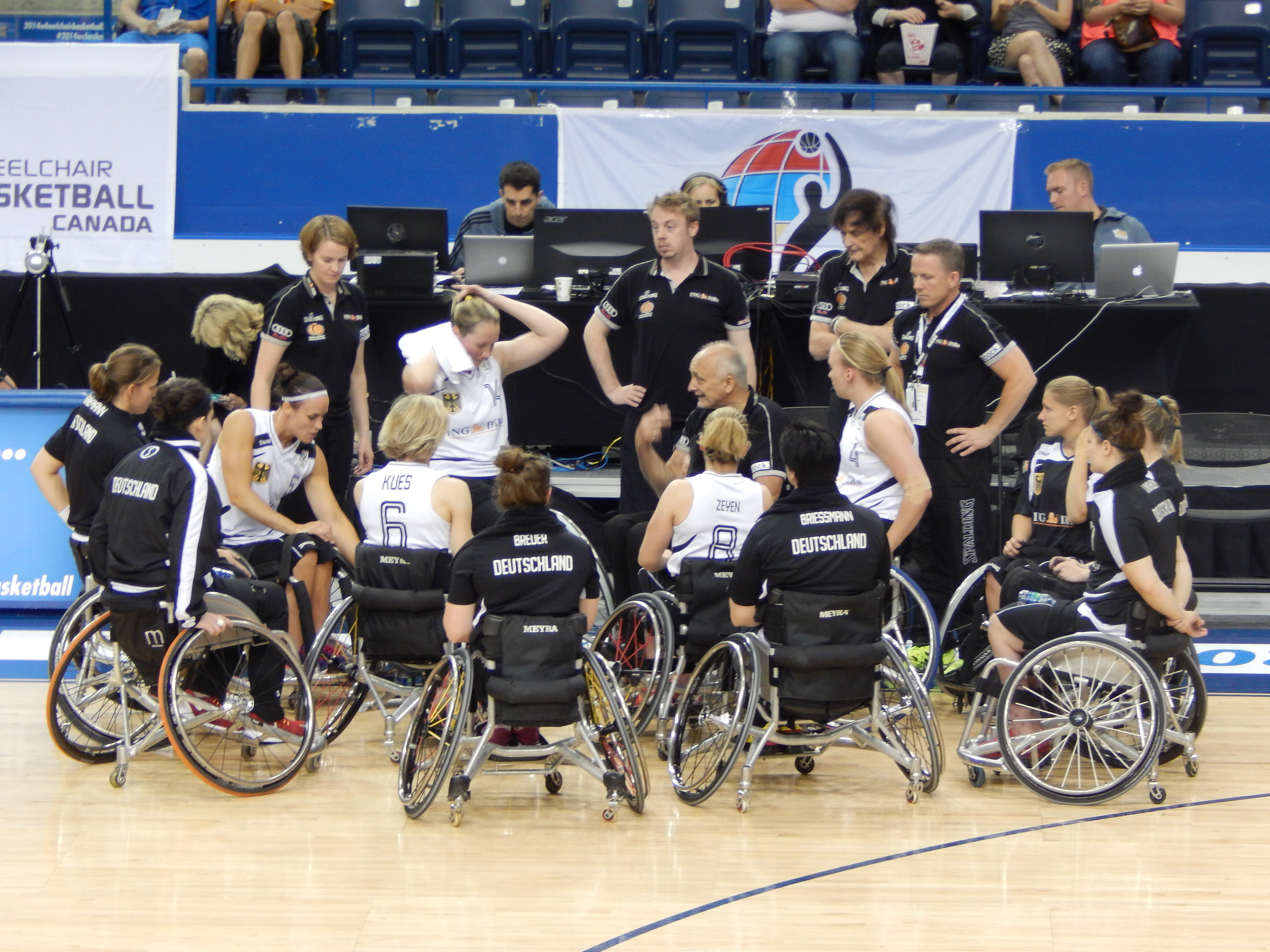
German team

Separate men's and women's Wheelchair Basketball World Championship tournaments were held in 2014. The women's tournament was held at the Mattamy Athletic Centre in Toronto, Canada between 20 and 28 June 2014. It was the largest women's wheelchair basketball world championship in history, with 12 national teams participating. Each team selected a squad of 12 players for the tournament.

== Medalists ==
Event	Gold	Silver	Bronze
Women's team	Canada Elaine Allard; Janet McLachlan; Arinn Young; Cindy Ouellet; Tamara Steeves; Maude Jacques; Katie Harnock; Darda Sales; Tracey Ferguson; Jamey Jewells; Amanda Yan; Melanie Hawtin; Coach: Bill Johnson	Germany Mareike Adermann; Johanna Welin; Simone Kues; Edina Müller; Annika Zeyen; Laura Fürst; Gesche Schünemann; Maya Lindholm; Annabel Breuer; Annegret Brießmann; Marina Mohnen; Linda Dahle; Coach: Holger Glinicki	Netherlands Inge Huitzing; Lucie Houven; Jiske Visser; Roos Oosterbaan; Sanne Timmermann; Bo Kramer; Wendy van der Wahl; Cher Korver; Saskia Pronk; Barbara van Bergen; Carina de Rooij; Mariska Beijer; Coach: Gertjan van der Linden

== Awards ==
Inge Huitzing (Netherlands) was named the most valuable player of the tournament. She was the tournament's top point scorer with 175 points, an average of 21.8 points per game. Janet McLachlan (Canada), Katie Harnock (Canada), Rebecca Murray (United States), Desiree Miller (United States) and Annika Zeyen (Germany) were named to the All Star Five.

In addition, each team was asked to nominate a player from their team who exemplified the principles of true sport. The True Sport award recipients were: Leanne Del Toso (Australia), Perla Assuncão (Brazil), Katie Harnock (Canada), Yong Qing Fu (China), Emilie Menard (France), Annika Zeyen (Germany), Clare Griffiths (Great Britain), Kyoko Miura (Japan), Floralia Estrada (Mexico), Cher Korver (Netherlands), Pilar Jauregui (Peru), and Kimberly Champion (United States).

== Squads ==
There were 12 women's teams competing. Each team selected a squad of 12 players for the tournament. Athletes were given an eight-level-score specific to wheelchair basketball, ranging from 0.5 to 4.5. Lower scores represent a higher degree of disability. The sum score of all players on the court cannot exceed 14.

Going into the tournament, the world rankings were:

1. Germany
2. Australia
3. Netherlands
4. United States
5. China
6. Canada
7. Great Britain
8. Mexico
9. Brazil
10. France

== Qualification ==
The 12 teams qualified in a series of zone championships.

Event	Date	Location	Vacancies	Qualified
Host Nation			1	Canada
Reigning champion			1	United States
European Wheelchair Basketball Championship	June 2013	Frankfurt, Germany	4	Netherlands; Germany; Great Britain; France
Asia-Oceania Zone Championships	November 2013	Bangkok, Thailand	3	Australia; China; Japan
Americas Cup for Women	July–August 2013	Bogotá, Colombia	3	Brazil; Mexico; Peru
Total			12	

No championship was held for the Africa zone, so its spot was allocated to the Americas.

== Preliminary round ==
=== Group A ===
Team	Pld	W	L	Pts.
Netherlands	5	5	0	10
United States	5	4	1	9
Australia	5	3	2	8
France	5	2	3	7
Mexico	5	1	4	6
Peru	5	0	5	5

20 June 2014
08:00

report

Netherlands	89–5	Peru
Scoring by quarter: 20–2, 19–0, 28–2, 22–1
Pts: Bejer 18; Rebs: De Rooij 11; Asts: Huitzing 8		Pts: Jauregui 4 Rebs: Jauregui 4 Player of the game: Pilar Jauregui

Mattamy Athletic Centre, Toronto

20 June 2014
18:00

report

United States	68–52	Australia
Scoring by quarter: 14–9, 22–18, 15–15, 17–10
Pts: Murray 30; Rebs: Murray 8, Gaeng 8 Asts: Murray 4, Miller 4 Player of the game: Rebecca Murray		Pts: Merritt 14; Rebs: Nott 5 Asts: Chaplin 4

Mattamy Athletic Centre, Toronto

20 June 2014
20:00

Mexico	42–61	France
Scoring by quarter: 8–16, 10–12, 14–18, 10–15
Pts: Estrada 14; Rebs: Estrada 10; Asts: Vasquez 4		Pts: Saint Omer-Delepine 26; Rebs: Saint Omer-Delepine 11; Asts: Pichon 4 Player of the game: Fabienne Saint Omer-Delepine

Mattamy Athletic Centre, Toronto

21 June 2014
10:00

report

France	21–77	Netherlands
Scoring by quarter: 8–16, 3–14, 4–24, 6–23
Pts: Saint Omer-Delepine 6, Pichon 6 Rebs: Saint Omer-Delepine 8, Pichon 8 Asts: Pichon 2		Pts: Bejer 30; Rebs: Bejer 10; Asts: Korver 4 Player of the game: Mariska Beijer

Mattamy Athletic Centre, Toronto

21 June 2014
13:00

report

Mexico	29–64	United States
Scoring by quarter: 6–17, 9–20, 8–18, 6–9
Pts: Estrada 19; Rebs: Lopez 9 Asts: Lopez 3		Pts: Murray 26; Rebs: Courtney 5, Blunk 5 Asts: Gaeng 5, Soldan 4 Player of the game: Rebecca Murray

Mattamy Athletic Centre, Toronto

21 June 2014
18:00

report

Peru	10–90	Australia
Scoring by quarter: 4–17, 2–20, 2–18, 2–9
Pts: Tunqui 2 Rebs: Jauregui 7		Pts: O'Kelly-Kennedy 25; Rebs: O'Kelly-Kennedy 7 Asts: Kean 8 Player of the game: Kathleen O`Kelly-Kennedy

Mattamy Athletic Centre, Toronto

22 June 2014
8:00

report

Netherlands	71–32	Mexico
Scoring by quarter: 21–13, 16–8, 18–6, 16–5
Pts: Bejer 18, Huitzig 18; Rebs: Huitzig 7 Asts: Huitzig 9 Player of the game: Inge Huitzig		Pts: Estrada 22; Rebs: Torres 10; Asts: Vasquez 4

Mattamy Athletic Centre, Toronto

22 June 2014
10:00

report

Australia	59–47	France
Scoring by quarter: 7–10, 14–7, 18–15, 20–15
Pts: Merritt 27; Rebs: Crispin 8 Asts: Chaplin 8 Player of the game: Amber Merritt		Pts: Menard 10; Rebs: Saint Omer-Delepine 5, Menard 5 Asts: Menard 7

Mattamy Athletic Centre, Toronto

22 June 2014
13:00

report

United States	95–14	Peru
Scoring by quarter: 40–0, 24–2, 14–6, 17–6
Pts: Champion 17, Hollermann 16; Rebs: Champion 6, Blunk 6, Ryan 6 Asts: Murray 6 Player of the game: Courtney Ryan		Pts: Jauregui 10; Rebs: Jauregui 7 Asts: Jauregui 1, Oblitas 1

Mattamy Athletic Centre, Toronto

23 June 2014
8:00

report

Peru	15–68	France
Scoring by quarter: 5–21, 6–13, 2–19, 2–15
Pts: Jauregui 5 Rebs: Jauregui 12; Asts: Jauregui 2		Pts: Pichon 16; Rebs: Pichon 10; Asts: Pichon 4 Player of the game: Emilie Menard

Mattamy Athletic Centre, Toronto

23 June 2014
15:00

report

Mexico	30–60	Australia
Scoring by quarter: 2–21, 8–16, 8–9, 12–12
Pts: Estrada 14; Rebs: Torres 6, Estrada 6, Vasquez 6 Asts: Estrada 3, Vasquez 3		Pts: Merritt 12; Rebs: Merritt 8 Asts: Chaplin 6 Player of the game: Shelley Chaplin

Mattamy Athletic Centre, Toronto

23 June 2014
18:00

report

United States	54–76	Netherlands
Scoring by quarter: 11–25, 16–14, 16–16, 11–21
Pts: Miller 17; Rebs: Murray 8 Asts: Murray 6		Pts: Beijer 23; Rebs: Beijer 11; Asts: Huitzing 13; Player of the game: Roos Oosterbaan

Mattamy Athletic Centre, Toronto

24 June 2014
8:00

report

Peru	24–63	Mexico
Scoring by quarter: 10–15, 4–26, 8–14, 2–8
Pts: Tunqui 10; Rebs: Sanabria 5 Asts: Jauregui 4		Pts: Estrada 27; Rebs: Estrada 11; Asts: Estrada 4, Torres 4 Player of the game: Floralia Estrada

Mattamy Athletic Centre, Toronto

24 June 2014
10:00

report

France	35–74	United States
Scoring by quarter: 7–23, 8–14, 11–19, 9–18
Pts: Pichon 19; Rebs: Menard 8 Asts: Pichon 2, Saint Omer-Delepine		Pts: Murray 25, Miller 20; Rebs: Murray 9, Miller 8 Asts: Murray 5 Player of the game: Desiree Miller

Mattamy Athletic Centre, Toronto

24 June 2014
20:00

report

Australia	38–47	Netherlands
Scoring by quarter: 16–12, 11–13, 6–14, 5–8
Pts: Stewart 10; Rebs: Kean 5 Asts: Gauci 6		Pts: Huitzing 19; Rebs: Korver 15; Asts: Huitzing 6 Player of the game: Amber Merritt

Mattamy Athletic Centre, Toronto

=== Group B ===
Team	Pld	W	L	Pts.
Germany	5	5	0	10
Canada	5	4	1	9
Great Britain	5	3	2	8
China	5	2	3	7
Japan	5	1	4	6
Brazil	5	0	5	5

20 June 2014
8:00

report

Great Britain	56–37	Brazil
Scoring by quarter: 16–6, 12–13, 16–14, 12–10
Pts: Freeman 20; Rebs: Freeman 11; Asts: Freeman 8 Player of the game: Amy Conroy		Pts: Assunção 10, Martins 10; Rebs: Martins 8 Asts: Assunção 6

Mattamy Athletic Centre, Toronto

20 June 2014
13:00

report

Canada	83–53	Japan
Scoring by quarter: 25–12, 17–18, 19–11, 22–12
Pts: McLachlan 28, Harnock 25; Rebs: McLachlan 21; Asts: Ouellet 10; Player of the game: Katie Harnock		Pts: Amimoto 18; Rebs: Amimoto 10; Asts: Mashiko 4

Mattamy Athletic Centre, Toronto

20 June 2014
15:00

report

Germany	59–45	China
Scoring by quarter: 20–11, 14–8, 18–16, 7–10
Pts: Mohnen 19, Zeyen 17; Rebs: Adermann 5 Asts: Zeyen 4, Mohnen 4 Player of the game: Annika Zeyen		Pts: Jiameng 12, Long 10; Rebs: Fu 8 Asts: Long 3, Deng 3

Mattamy Athletic Centre, Toronto

21 June 2014
8:00

report

China	59–45	Japan
Scoring by quarter: 13–21, 18–13, 18–8, 12–13
Pts: Fu 29; Rebs: Jiameng 14, Fu 13; Asts: Long 6 Player of the game: Yong Qing Fu		Pts: Amimoto 22; Rebs: Amimoto 15; Asts: Amimoto 7

Mattamy Athletic Centre, Toronto

21 June 2014
15:00

report

Brazil	25–63	Canada
Scoring by quarter: 11–26, 6–16, 2–11, 6–10
Pts: Assunção 11; Rebs: Sales 11; Asts: Santana 4		Pts: McLachan 21; Rebs: McLachan 13; Asts: McLachan 4 Player of the game: Janet McLachlan

Mattamy Athletic Centre, Toronto

21 June 2014
20:00

report

Great Britain	33–55	Germany
Scoring by quarter: 10–17, 8–14, 9–10, 6–14
Pts: Freeman 14; Rebs: Williams 5 Asts: Freeman 4, Griffiths 4		Pts: Schuenemann 26; Rebs: Schuenemann 11; Asts: Schuenemann 3 Player of the game: Gesche Schuenemann

Mattamy Athletic Centre, Toronto

22 June 2014
15:00

report

Canada	76–53	China
Scoring by quarter: 18–10, 25–16, 29–13, 14–14
Pts: McLachan 27; Rebs: McLachan 17; Asts: Oullet 12; Player of the game: Janet McLachlan		Pts: Fu 15; Rebs: Fu 9 Asts: Long 9

Mattamy Athletic Centre, Toronto

22 June 2014
18:00

report

Brazil	40–74	Germany
Scoring by quarter: 10–17, 8–14, 9–10, 6–14
Pts: Martins 8 Rebs: Martins 5 Asts: Assuncao 6		Pts: Adermann 29; Rebs: Adermann 19; Asts: Lindholm 7 Player of the game: Mareike Adermann

Mattamy Athletic Centre, Toronto

22 June 2014
20:00

report

Japan	48–62	Great Britain
Scoring by quarter: 12–18, 10–10, 8–18, 18–18
Pts: Amimoto 25; Rebs: Mashiko 10; Asts: Mashiko 4		Pts: Hamer 26; Rebs: Hamer 7, Williams 7 Asts: Freeman 9 Player of the game: Judith Hamer

Mattamy Athletic Centre, Toronto

23 June 2014
10:00

report

Great Britain	64–47	China
Scoring by quarter: 15–15, 16–10, 23–8, 10–14
Pts: Freeman 36; Rebs: Conroy 11; Asts: Freeman 6 Player of the game: Helen Freeman		Pts: Fu 12; Rebs: Fu 8 Asts: Long 7

Mattamy Athletic Centre, Toronto

23 June 2014
13:00

report

Japan	63–52	Brazil
Scoring by quarter: 18–11, 13–13, 16–13, 16–15
Pts: Amimoto 37; Rebs: Amimoto; Asts: Mashiko 8 Player of the game: Mari Amimoto		Pts: Almeida 12; Rebs: Assunção 6 Asts: Andrade Santos 4

Mattamy Athletic Centre, Toronto

23 June 2014
20:00

report

Germany	64–53	Canada
Scoring by quarter: 18–15, 13–10, 18–8, 15–14
Pts: Schuenemann 28; Rebs: Schuenemann 10; Asts: Zeyen 7 Player of the game: Marina Mohnen		Pts: Ouellet 16; Rebs: McLachlan 15; Asts: Ouellet 5

Mattamy Athletic Centre, Toronto

24 June 2014
13:00

report

Germany	82–49	Japan
Scoring by quarter: 19–12, 17–14, 22–9, 24–14
Pts: Adermnn 23; Rebs: Adermann 9 Asts: Schuenemann 6 Player of the game: Simone Kues		Pts: Amimoto 20; Rebs: Amimoto 8 Asts: Amimoto 5

Mattamy Athletic Centre, Toronto

24 June 2014
15:00

report

China	75–44	Brazil
Scoring by quarter: 22–8, 12–14, 22–12, 19–10
Pts: Fu 34; Rebs: Fu 7, Zheng 7 Asts: Long 10; Player of the game: Yun Long		Pts: Almeida 17; Rebs: Almeida 6 Asts: Assunção 7

Mattamy Athletic Centre, Toronto

24 June 2014
18:00

report

Canada	59–52	Great Britain
Scoring by quarter: 12–11, 13–15, 15–14, 19–12
Pts: McLachlan 28; Rebs: McLachlan 15; Asts: Ouellet 7 Player of the game: Janet McLachlan		Pts: Conroy 18; Rebs: Freeman 9, Williams 8 Asts: Freeman 13

Mattamy Athletic Centre, Toronto

== Finals ==
Quarter-finals
26 June 2014
Germany	70
France	25
26 June 2014
United States	53
Great Britain	41
26 June 2014
Netherlands	62
China	52
26 June 2014
Canada	63
Australia	47

Semi-finals
27 June 2014
Germany	68
United States	58
27 June 2014
Netherlands	74
Canada	75

Final
28 June 2014
Germany	50
Canada	54
Third place
28 June 2014
Netherlands	74
United States	58

11th vs 12th place game

26 June 2014
8:00

report

Peru	8–88	Brazil
Scoring by quarter: 0–14, 0–22, 4–26, 4–26
Pts: Garcia 2, Sanabria 2 Rebs: Jauregui 10; Asts: Jauregui 1		Pts: Santana 29, Almeida 22, Assancao 20; Rebs: Almeida 7 Asts: Assunção 10; Player of the game: Perla Assunção

Mattamy Athletic Centre, Toronto

9th vs 10th place game

26 June 2014
10:00

report

Mexico	40–68	Japan
Scoring by quarter: 12–16, 14–16, 8–17, 6–19
Pts: Vasquez 17, Estrada 16; Rebs: Vasquez 8, Estrada 7 Asts: Estrada 4		Pts: Amimoto 26; Rebs: Amimoto 10; Asts: Amimoto 10; Player of the game: Mayo Hagino

Mattamy Athletic Centre, Toronto

1st Quarterfinal

26 June 2014
13:00

report

Germany	70–25	France
Scoring by quarter: 23–1, 16–9, 10–8, 21–7
Pts: Adermann 27, Mohnen 26; Rebs: Adermann 11; Asts: Adermann 3, Zeyen 3, Mohnen 3 Player of the game: Mareike Adermann		Pts: Laurent 8 Rebs: Menard 5 Asts: Saint Omer-Delepine 2, Delphine 2

Mattamy Athletic Centre, Toronto

2nd Quarterfinal

26 June 2014
13:00

report

Netherlands	62–52	China
Scoring by quarter: 15–12, 21–12, 12–14, 14–14
Pts: Huitzing 28, Beijer 20; Rebs: Beijer 9, Huitzing 8, Korver 8 Asts: Huitzing 8 Player of the game: Inge Huitzing		Pts: Fu 24, Dai 22; Rebs: Fu 11, Dai 10; Asts: Long 6

Mattamy Athletic Centre, Toronto

3rd Quarterfinal

26 June 2014
18:00

report

Canada	63–47	Australia
Scoring by quarter: 19–14, 14–15, 20–8, 10–10
Pts: Ouellet 20, McLachlan 17, Harnock 17; Rebs: McLachlan 15; Asts: Ouellet 7 Player of the game: Cindy Ouellet		Pts: Stewart 12; Rebs: Stewart 6 Asts: Gauci 7

Mattamy Athletic Centre, Toronto

4th Quarterfinal

26 June 2014
20:00

report

United States	53–41	Great Britain
Scoring by quarter: 13–8, 14–10, 11–12, 15–11
Pts: Murray 15, Gaeng 15; Rebs: Gaeng 11; Asts: Murray 7 Player of the game: Gail Gaeng		Pts: Hamer 14; Rebs: Freeman 10; Asts: Freeman 7

Mattamy Athletic Centre, Toronto

1st Consolation

27 June 2014
13:00

report

Great Britain	58–41	France
Scoring by quarter: 9–9, 18–10, 10–14, 21–8
Pts: Freeman 29; Rebs: Freeman 5 Asts: Freeman 6 Player of the game: Helen Freeman		Pts: Saint Omer-Delepine 18; Rebs: Saint Omer-Delepine 15; Asts: Saint Omer-Delepine 3, Pichon 3

Mattamy Athletic Centre, Toronto

2nd Consolation

27 June 2014
15:00

report

Australia	62–57	China
Scoring by quarter: 13–12, 19–17, 18–11, 12–17
Pts: Merritt 24, Stewart 16, Gauci 14; Rebs: Merrit 7 Asts: Gauci 10; Player of the game: Kylie Gauci		Pts: Dai 21; Rebs: Dai 7 Asts: Long 10

Mattamy Athletic Centre, Toronto

1st Semifinal

27 June 2014
18:00

report

Netherlands	74–75	Canada
Scoring by quarter: 20–16, 20–18, 12–17, 22–24
Pts: Huitzing 33, Beijer 28; Rebs: Beijer 10, Huitzing 8 Asts: Korver 8		Pts: McLachlan 25, Harnock 22, Ouelleit 16; Rebs: McLachlan 18; Asts: Ouelleit 14

Mattamy Athletic Centre, Toronto

2nd Semifinal

27 June 2014
20:00

report

Germany	68–58	United States
Scoring by quarter: 21–18, 11–18, 14–12, 22–12
Pts: Mohnen 27; Rebs: Mohnen 10; Asts: Mohnen 5, Zeyen 5		Pts: Hollermann 25; Rebs: Hollermann 8 Asts: Murray 10

Mattamy Athletic Centre, Toronto

7th vs 8th place game

28 June 2014
8:00

report

China	64–30	France
Scoring by quarter: 21–5, 17–15, 13–2, 13–8
Pts: Dai 23; Rebs: Fu 11; Asts: Long 7		Pts: Saint Omer-Delepine 10, Pichin 10; Rebs: Saint Omer-Delepine 10; Asts: Pichon 10

Mattamy Athletic Centre, Toronto

5th vs 6th place game

28 June 2014
10:00

report

Australia	70–77 (OT)	Great Britain
Scoring by quarter: 16–18, 12–17, 20–14, 16–15, Overtime: 6–13
Pts: Merritt 32; Rebs: Crispin 8 Asts: Del Toso 7, Chaplin 6		Pts: Freeman 41; Rebs: Freeman 11; Asts: Freeman 10

Mattamy Athletic Centre, Toronto

Bronze medal game

28 June 2014
13:00

report

Netherlands	74–58	United States
Scoring by quarter: 13–16, 16–12, 18–10, 27–20
Pts: Huitzing 43; Rebs: Huitzing 9, Beijer 8 Asts: Korver 6		Pts: Murray 22; Rebs: Hollermann 13; Asts: Murray 9

Mattamy Athletic Centre, Toronto

Gold medal game

28 June 2014
15:00

report

Germany	50–54	Canada
Scoring by quarter: 12–11, 10–14, 14–14, 14–15
Pts: Mohnen 20; Rebs: Zeyen 7 Asts: Zeyen 7		Pts: McLachlan 15, Ouellet 15; Rebs: McLachlan 19; Asts: Ouellet

Mattamy Athletic Centre, Toronto

2014 Women's World Wheelchair Basketball Championship

Canada
5th title

== Final standings ==
Rank	Team
1	Canada
2	Germany
3	Netherlands
4	United States
5	Great Britain
6	Australia
7	China
8	France
9	Japan
10	Mexico
11	Brazil
12	Peru

== See also ==
- 2014 FIBA World Championship for Women
