= Saskia Pronk =

Dutch wheelchair basketball player

Personal information
- Born: 6 August 1983 (age 42) Den Helder, Netherlands

Sport
- Country: Netherlands
- Sport: Wheelchair basketball
- Position: forward
- Disability: spinal cord injury
- Disability class: 1.0
Medal record
Women's wheelchair basketball
Representing Netherlands
Paralympic Games
Gold medal – first place	2020 Tokyo	Team
Gold medal – first place	2024 Paris	Team
Bronze medal – third place	2012 London	Team
World Championships
Gold medal – first place	2018 Hamburg	Team
Bronze medal – third place	2014 Toronto	Team
European Championships
Gold medal – first place	2017 Tenerife	Team
Gold medal – first place	2019 Rotterdam	Team

Saskia Pronk (born 6 August 1983) is a Dutch wheelchair basketball player (1.0 disability class) and a member of the Netherlands women's national wheelchair basketball team. She plays as a forward. With the national team she won the gold medal at the 2020 Summer Paralympics, and the bronze medal at the 2012 Summer Paralympics.

She also became world champion in 2018 and European champion in 2017 and 2019.

== Life ==
Pronk was born in Den Helder on 6 August 1983. Due to a failed surgery in 2005 she has a paraplegia. She started playing with wheelchair basketball in 2007 after being invited by the coach of club JBC in Julianadorp. She made her debut for the Dutch national team in 2010.
