= Amanda Yan =

Canadian wheelchair athlete

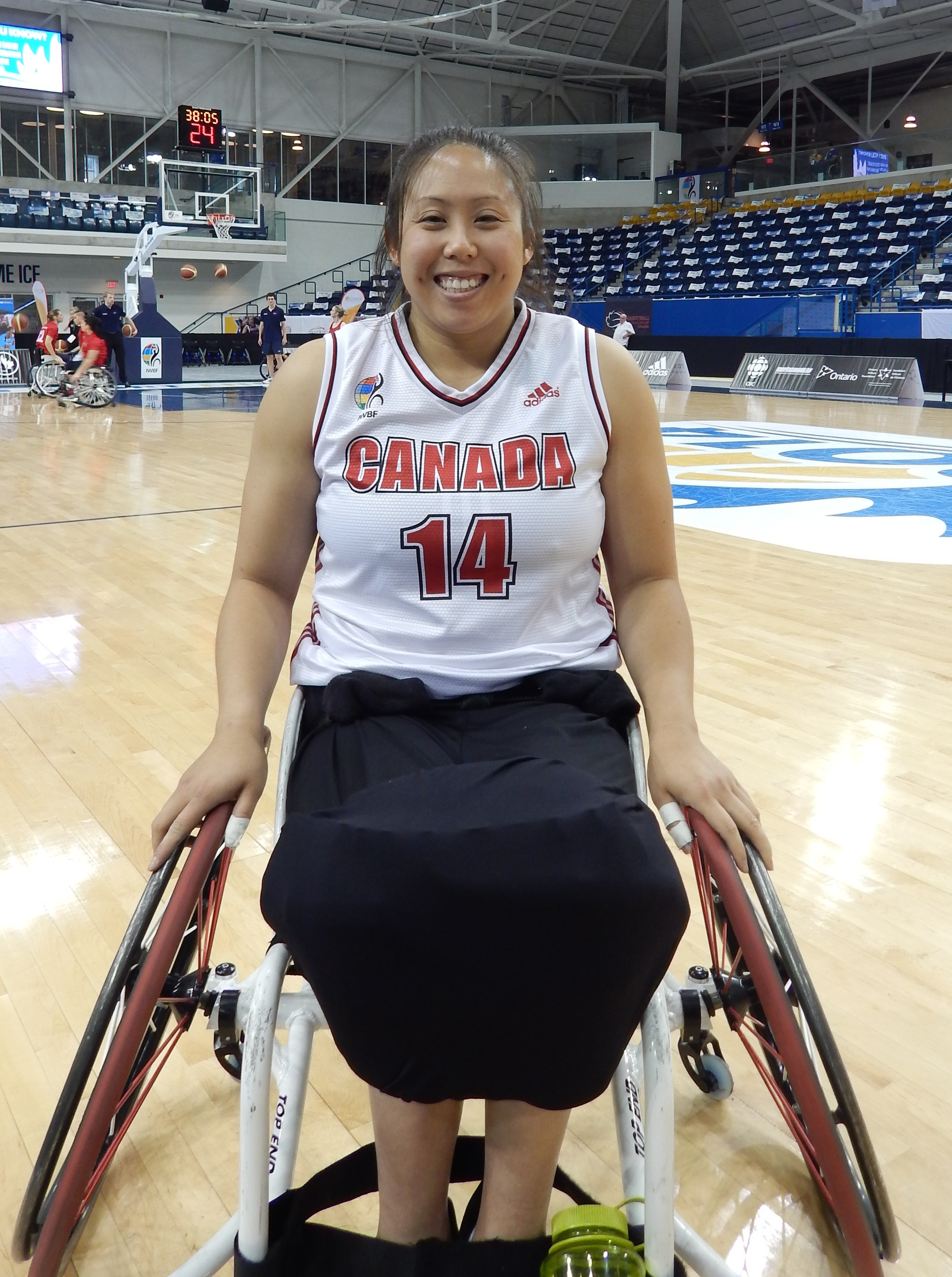
- Team Canada – No 14 – Amanda Yan

Personal information
- Nationality: Canada
- Born: May 22, 1988 (age 38) Burnaby, British Columbia
- Height: 5 ft 4 in (163 cm)

Sport
- Sport: Wheelchair basketball
- Disability class: 3.0
- Event: Women's team
- Team: BC Breakers
Medal record
Wheelchair basketball
Gold medal – first place	2014 World Championships	Women's wheelchair basketball

Amanda Yan (born May 22, 1988) is a Canadian 3.0 point wheelchair basketball and wheelchair tennis player who won a gold medal at the 2014 Women's World Wheelchair Basketball Championship in Toronto. She was also a national champion in shot put in 2012.

== Biography ==
Amanda Yan was born in Burnaby, British Columbia, on May 22, 1988. She attended Burnaby Central Secondary School, where as a teenager she was an active athlete who played basketball, volleyball and track and field athletics. She then became a student at Simon Fraser University.

On April 19, 2008, Yan was snowboarding at Whistler, British Columbia, when the edge of her snowboard became caught on a cat track, causing her to slide off the Crystal Road run — rated a beginner's run — and fall 30 metres (98 ft) off a cliff. She suffered horrific injuries, dislocating two vertebrae and fracturing three, as well as fracturing her right femur and right wrist, and suffering brain, lung and kidney damage. She was airlifted to hospital, where she was informed that there was little chance that she would ever walk again. Months of rehabilitation at the GF Strong Rehabilitation Centre in Vancouver followed.

During rehabilitation Yan was introduced to the sport of wheelchair basketball. Classified as a 3.0 point player, she began playing in her local competition in 2011. She was named the BC-CWBL Division 2's Most Improved Player for 2011–12. The following season saw her playing for the BC Breakers, who went on to win the 2012 national championship title. The BC Breakers came fourth in 2013, but Yan was named to the Championship's All-Star Five. She also began playing with the BC Royals in the men's league.

In March 2014, Yan was named the BC Wheelchair Basketball Society's Female Athlete of the Year. She also received a True Sport award, which is given annually to an elite athlete with a commitment to fair play and inclusion by Wheelchair Basketball Canada. The following month the BC Breakers again won the CWBL Women's National Championship before a home-town crowd in Richmond, British Columbia, with Yan again being named an All Star.

Yan became part of the national team in 2013, representing Canada at the Osaka Cup that year. In July 2014, she was part of the team that won a gold medal at the 2014 Women's World Wheelchair Basketball Championship in Toronto.

In addition to playing wheelchair basketball, Yan plays a number of other sports, including swimming, handcycling, wheelchair racing, wheelchair tennis, and track and field, in events such as shot put, javelin and discus. She received the 2012 Avchen (Harivel) Pinkard Rookie of the Year award for track and field. She was a national champion in shot put in 2012, and also came second in women's wheelchair tennis (singles and doubles) at the national championship that year.

Statistics
Competition	Season	M	FGM-A	FG%	3PM-A	3P%	FTM-A	FT%	OR-DR	AST	PTS	SRC
World Championships	2014	3	3-6	50	0-0	0	0-0	0	1-4	4	6	

Key
FGM, FGA, FG%: field goals made, attempted and percentage	3PM, 3PA, 3P%: three-point field goals made, attempted and percentage
FTM, FTA, FT%: free throws made, attempted and percentage	OR, DR: offensive, defensive rebounds
PTS: points	AST: assists
