= Sandrella Awad =

French wheelchair basketball player

Sandrella Awad (born 2 August 1983 in Marseille, France) is a French Paralympic wheelchair basketball player. She currently plays with the Handi Sud Basket team and the France women's national wheelchair basketball team. Sandrella Awad will be part of the French delegation at the 2016 Summer Paralympics in Rio.

== International career ==
As part of the French women's national wheelchair basketball team, Sandrella Awad took part in the following competitions :

- 2013 : European championship, 4th place
- 2014 : World championship, 8th place
- 2015 : European championship, 4th place

== See also ==
- France at the 2016 Summer Paralympics
- Wheelchair basketball at the 2016 Summer Paralympics
