= Maya Lindholm =

German wheelchair basketball player

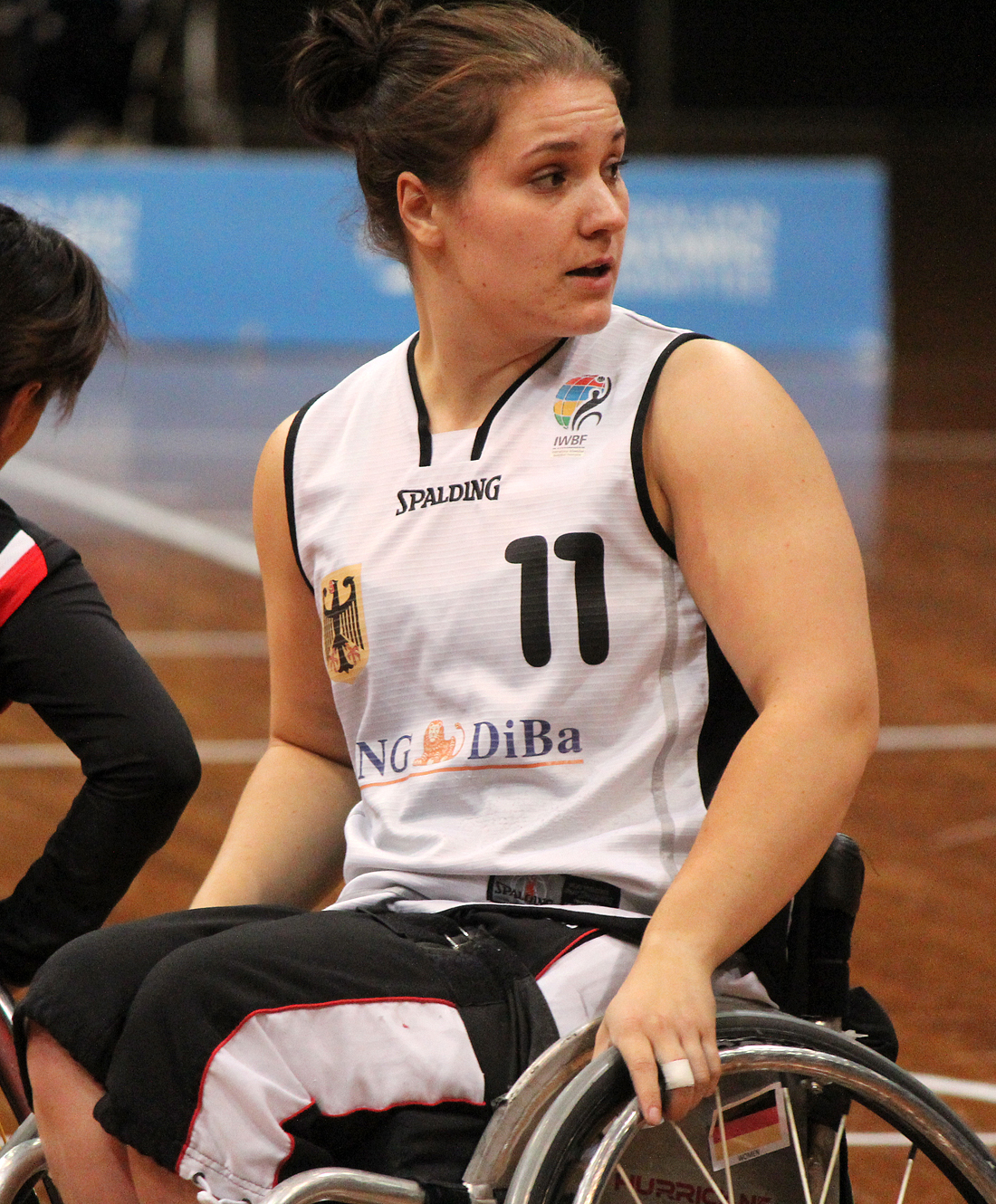
- Maya Lindholm in Sydney, July 2012

Personal information
- Born: 20 December 1990 (age 35) Hamburg, Germany

Sport
- Country: Germany
- Sport: Wheelchair basketball
- Position: Power forward
- Disability class: 2.5
- Event: Women's team
- Team: Hamburger SV; BG Baskets Hamburg
- Coached by: Holger Glinicki

Achievements and titles
- Paralympic finals: 2012 Paralympics, 2016 Paralympics
Medal record
Women's wheelchair basketball
Representing Germany
Paralympic Games
Gold medal – first place	2012 London	Team competition
Silver medal – second place	2016 Rio de Janeiro	Team competition
World Championship
Silver medal – second place	2010 Birmingham	Team competition
Silver medal – second place	2014 Toronto	Team competition
Bronze medal – third place	2018 Hamburg	Team competition

Maya Lindholm (born 20 December 1990) is a German wheelchair basketball player, who played with the German national team that won a gold medal at the 2012 Summer Paralympics in London. She also won a European title in 2011 and was runner-up in 2013. President Joachim Gauck awarded the team Germany's highest sporting honour, the Silbernes Lorbeerblatt (Silver Laurel Leaf).

== Biography ==
Maya Lindholm was born in Hamburg on 20 December 1990. In 2004, she awoke one morning with severe back pain, and within hours she could no longer move her legs. Doctors diagnosed spinal cord inflammation. She is studying to be an occupational therapist at the BG Trauma Hospital in Hamburg Boberg. She began playing wheelchair basketball for fun at the hospital in 2005. In 2009, she was selected as part of the national team.

Classified as a 2.5 point player, Lindholm plays power forward. She was part of the team that won the European Championships in Nazareth, Israel, in 2011, thereby qualifying for the 2012 Summer Paralympic Games in London. As part of the team's preparation, they toured the United States and Australia. The German team went through the group stage undefeated, but started off slow in its games against the United States and China, winning these games by six-point margins, and seemed to play its best basketball only in the final minutes of a game.

In the Gold Medal match in London, the team faced the Australia women's national wheelchair basketball team, which had defeated them 48–46 in Sydney just a few months before. In front of a crowd of over 12,985 at the North Greenwich Arena, they defeated the Australians 58–44 to win the gold medal, the first that Germany had won in women's wheelchair basketball since 1984. They were awarded the Silver Laurel Leaf by President Joachim Gauck in November 2012, They were also named Team of the Year in Disability Sports for 2012, an annual award voted for by 3,000 members of the Association of German Sports Journalists.

Lindholm's local team, Hamburger SV, which also included national teammates Mareike Adermann and Edina Müller (and Australia's Bridie Kean) won the women's national championship for the eighth time in 2013. Lindholm was also part of the Hamburger SV team that had previously won it in 2010.

The German national team was not so fortunate, losing the final of the European Championship to the Netherlands before a home town crowd in Frankfurt. It claimed silver at the 2014 Women's World Wheelchair Basketball Championship in Toronto, Ontario, Canada, and beat the Netherlands in the 2015 European Championships, to claim its tenth European title. At the 2016 Paralympic Games, it won silver after losing the final to the United States.

== Achievements ==
- 2010: German Women's National League champion (Hamburg SV)
- 2010: Silver at the IWBF World Championships (Birmingham, Great Britain)
- 2011: Gold at the European Wheelchair Basketball Championships (Nazareth, Israel)
- 2012: Gold at the Paralympic Games (London, England)
- 2013: German Women's National League champion (Hamburg SV)
- 2013: Silver at the European Championships (Frankfurt, Germany)
- 2014: Silver at the World Championships (Toronto, Canada)
- 2015: Gold at the European Championships (Worcester, England)
- 2016: Silver at the Paralympic Games (Rio de Janeiro, Brazil)

== Awards ==
- 2012: Team of the Year
- 2012: Silver Laurel Leaf
