= Darda Sales =

Canadian swimmer and wheelchair basketball player

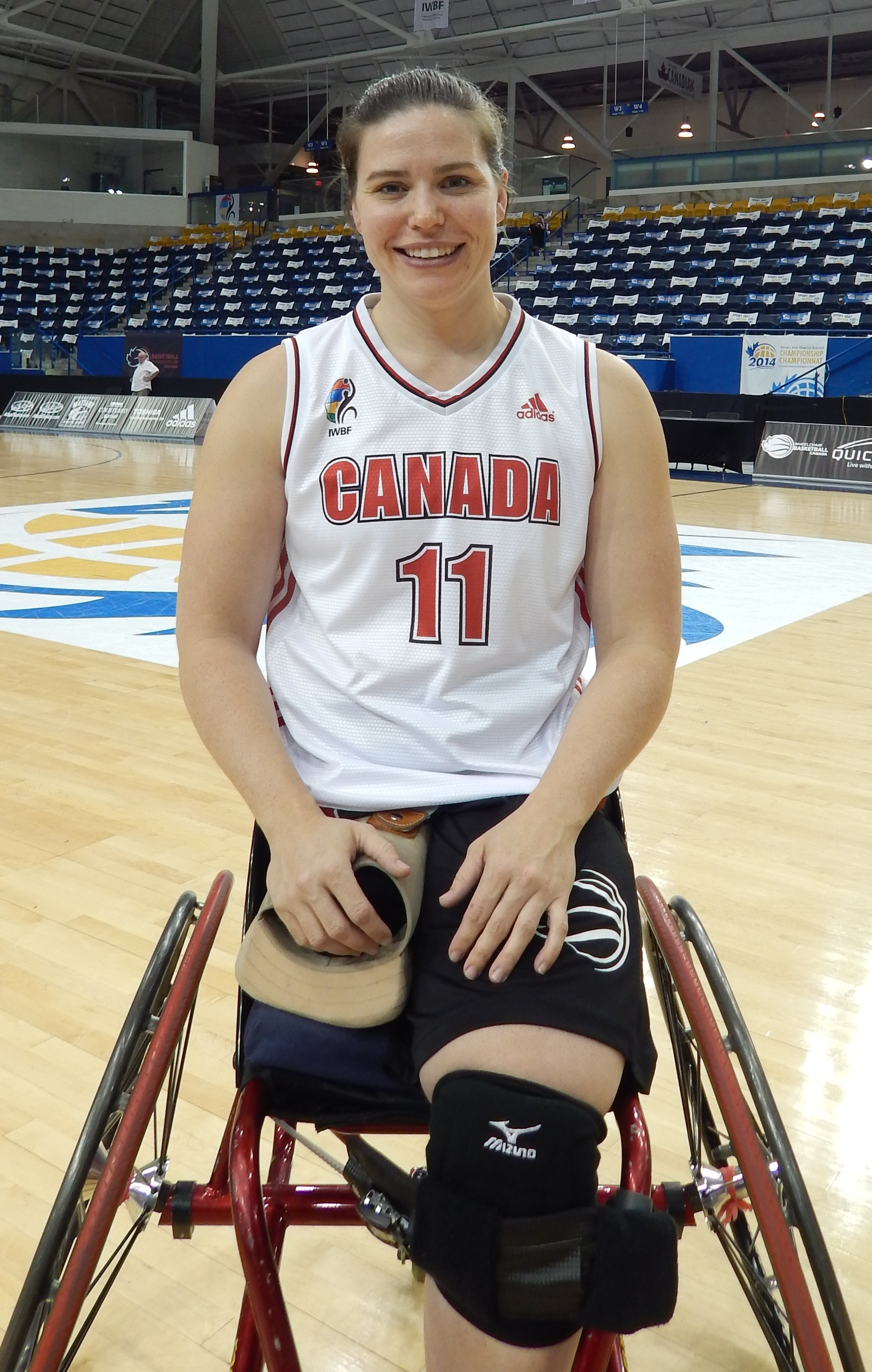
- Team Canada – No 11 – Darda Sales

Personal information
- Nationality: Canada
- Born: September 1, 1982 (age 43) London, Ontario
- Height: 5 ft 7 in (1.70 m)

Sport
- Sport: Wheelchair basketball Swimming
- Disability class: 4.0 (basketball); S9 (swimming)
- Event: Women's team
- Club: London
Medal record
Swimming
Paralympic Games
Gold medal – first place	2000 Sydney	4×100 m Medley relay 34 pts
Silver medal – second place	2004 Athens	4×100 m Medley relay 34 pts
IPC Swimming World Championships
Gold medal – first place	2002 Mar del Plata	4×100 m Medley relay 34 pts
Silver medal – second place	2006 Durban	4×100 m Freestyle relay 34 pts
Bronze medal – third place	2006 Durban	400m Freestyle S9
Bronze medal – third place	2006 Durban	100m Freestyle S9
Wheelchair basketball
World championships
Gold medal – first place	2014 World Championships	Women's wheelchair basketball
Parapan American Games
Silver medal – second place	2015 Toronto	Women's wheelchair basketball

Darda Sales (born September 1, 1982) is a Canadian swimmer, 4.0 point wheelchair basketball player and motivational speaker. She won gold medals with the 4x100 medley relay team at the 2000 Summer Paralympics in Sydney and the 2002 IPC Swimming World Championships in Mar del Plata, and a silver medal at the 2004 Summer Paralympics in Athens. She switched to wheelchair basketball after she retired from swimming in 2009, and won a gold medal in that sport at the 2014 Women's World Wheelchair Basketball Championship in Toronto.

== Biography ==
Darda Geiger was born in London, Ontario, on September 1, 1982. She was the youngest of four children, with two older brothers and an older sister. She grew up on a farm in rural Ontario. In 1985, when she was two, she lost her right leg above the knee in a farm accident. She has a Bachelor of Arts with Honors degree in kinesiology from the University of Western Ontario and a postgraduate certificate in therapeutic recreation. She is an athlete therapeutic recreational therapist.

When Geiger was nine, she met three athletes who were training for the 1992 Summer Paralympics in Barcelona, and decided to become a Paralympian too. This dream came true at the 2000 Summer Paralympics in Sydney. As a member of the 4x100 medley relay team, she won a gold medal in the world record time. This was followed by a gold medal in the same event at the IPC Swimming World Championships in 2002, and a silver at the 2004 Summer Paralympics in Athens. She also won bronze medals in the 100 m freestyle and 400 m freestyle events at the 2006 IPC World Championships.

Geiger married Brad Sales, a fellow Paralympic swimmer and member of the Canadian national swim team, and now goes by the name of Darda Sales. They have three children. She competed in the 50 m, 100 m and 400m freestyle and the 100 m backstroke events at the 2008 Summer Paralympics in Beijing, her third Paralympic Games, but did not win a medal.

Sales retired from swimming in 2009, but became interested in wheelchair basketball. She competed for Team Ontario at the women's national championships, and made the national team in 2014. She was part of the team that won a gold medal at the 2014 Women's World Wheelchair Basketball Championship in Toronto in July 2014. and silver at the 2015 Parapan American Games in August 2015.
