= Helen Turner (basketball) =

British wheelchair basketball player (born 1977)

Personal information
- Nationality: United Kingdom
- Born: Helen Turner; 15 October 1977 (age 49) London, England

Sport
- Country: Great Britain
- Sport: Wheelchair basketball
- Event: Women's team
- Club: Team Mandeville

Helen Turner (born 15 October 1977) is a British wheelchair basketball player. She has represented Great Britain at the 2004 Summer Paralympics in Athens, 2008 Summer Paralympics in Beijing and 2012 Summer Paralympics in London. She has won four bronze medals at European championships as part of the Great Britain women's national wheelchair basketball team. She is a 3.5 point player.

== Personal ==
Turner was born on 15 October 1977 in London, England. She lives in Chobham, Surrey. She became a paraplegic at the age of twenty after breaking her back. She has a son, Luke. In 2001, she graduated from the University of Roehampton with a Bachelor's degree in English Language.

== Wheelchair basketball ==
Turner began playing wheelchair basketball for the Aspire Force team in 1999, and made her championship début at the 2003 European Championships, held in Hamburg, Germany. At this event, she finished in bronze position. When she was in rehabilitation after breaking her back at the age of twenty, Turner watched wheelchair basketball in the spinal unit's sport centre. As of 2012, she is classed as a 3.5 point player. Turner has won four bronze medals at various European Championships.

Turner first played for Great Britain in 2003, at the European Championships in Hamburg, where her team finished with a bronze medal. The following year, Turner was part of the team that came eighth at the 2004 Athens Paralympics. Three years on, she won a bronze medal as part of her team at the 2007 European Championships held in Wetzlar, Germany. Her team came eighth at the 2008 Beijing Paralympics, . She won a bronze medal with her team at the 2009 FSB European Championships in Stoke Mandeville, England, was part of the team that came sixth at the 2010 Birmingham World Wheelchair Basketball Championships, and won another bronze medal with her team at the 2011 European Championships in Nazareth. At the 2012 London Paralympics, she was part of the team that came seventh, after winning against the Mexican team.

In August 2012, Turner told BBC Surrey, "[The Paralympics] will be extremely special. We know they will get behind us and cheer us on. It gives us that extra bit of confidence that we need on the court." (Note: Original quote: "It will be extremely special. We know they will get behind us and cheer us on." and "It gives us that extra bit of confidence that we need on the court.")
