= Barbara van Bergen =

Dutch basketball player and para-alpine skier

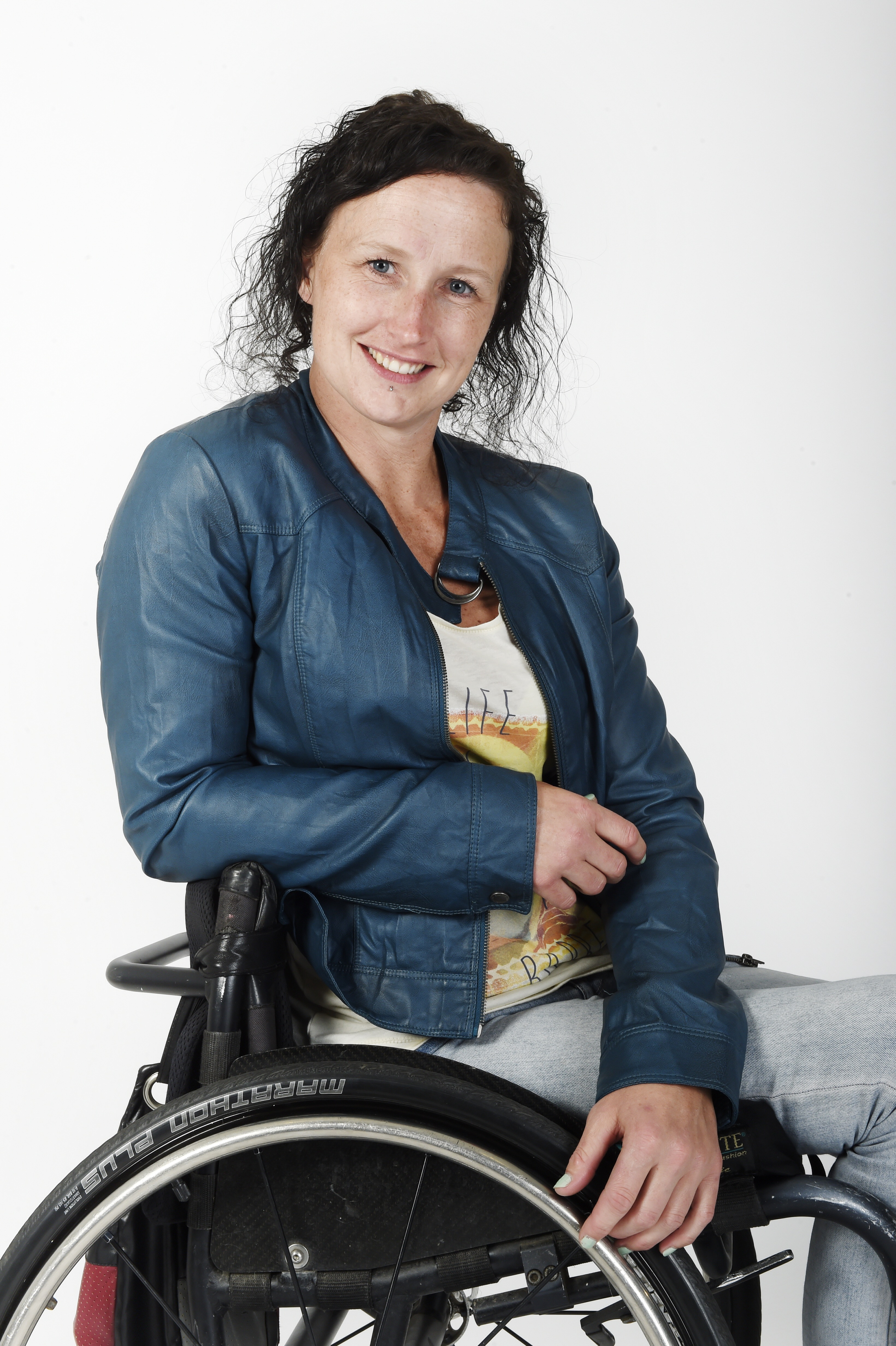
- van Bergen in 2015

Personal information
- National team: Netherlands
- Born: 9 June 1978 (age 48) Rotterdam, South Holland, Netherlands

Sport
- Country: Netherlands
- Sport: Wheelchair basketball; Para-alpine skiing
- Event: Women's wheelchair basketball
Medal record
Representing Netherlands
Women's wheelchair basketball
Paralympic Games
| Bronze medal – third place | 2016 Rio de Janeiro | Team |
| Bronze medal – third place | 2012 London | Team |
European Wheelchair Basketball Championship
| Gold medal – first place | 2013 Frankfurt | Team |
| Silver medal – second place | 2015 Worcester | Team |
| Silver medal – second place | 2011 Nazareth | Team |
| Silver medal – second place | 2009 Stoke Mandeville | Team |
| Silver medal – second place | 2007 Wetzlar | Team |
Wheelchair Basketball World Championship
| Bronze medal – third place | 2014 Toronto | Team |
Women's para-alpine skiing
World Championships
| Gold medal – first place | 2023 Lleida | Downhill |
| Silver medal – second place | 2021 Lillehammer | Downhill |

Barbara van Bergen (born 9 June 1978) is a Dutch wheelchair basketball player and para-alpine skier.

== Career ==
=== Wheelchair basketball ===
Van Bergen began her career in 2007 with the team of the Rotterdam Arrows'81 and in 2008 played for the Dutch women's wheelchair basketball team at the 2008 Summer Paralympics in Beijing, where they reached the quarter-finals. Three years later, the Dutch wheelchair basketball team qualified for the 2012 Summer Paralympics in London. After losing in the semi-final, they won the bronze medal match.

After winning gold at the 2013 Women's European Wheelchair Basketball Championship in Frankfurt, and bronze at the 2014 Women's World Wheelchair Basketball Championship in Toronto, the Dutch team won the silver medal at the 2015 Women's European Wheelchair Basketball Championship, thus qualifying for the 2016 Summer Paralympics in Rio de Janeiro, where they won the bronze medal once again.

=== Para-alpine skiing ===
Van Bergen has been active in sitting para-alpine skiing since 2014. After the 2016 Paralympic Games, she focused on this sport. In December 2021, she managed to qualify for the 2022 Winter Paralympics in Beijing. At the 2021 World Para Snow Sports Championships held in Lillehammer, Norway, van Bergen won the silver medal in the downhill event.
