= Katie Harnock =

Canadian wheelchair basketball player

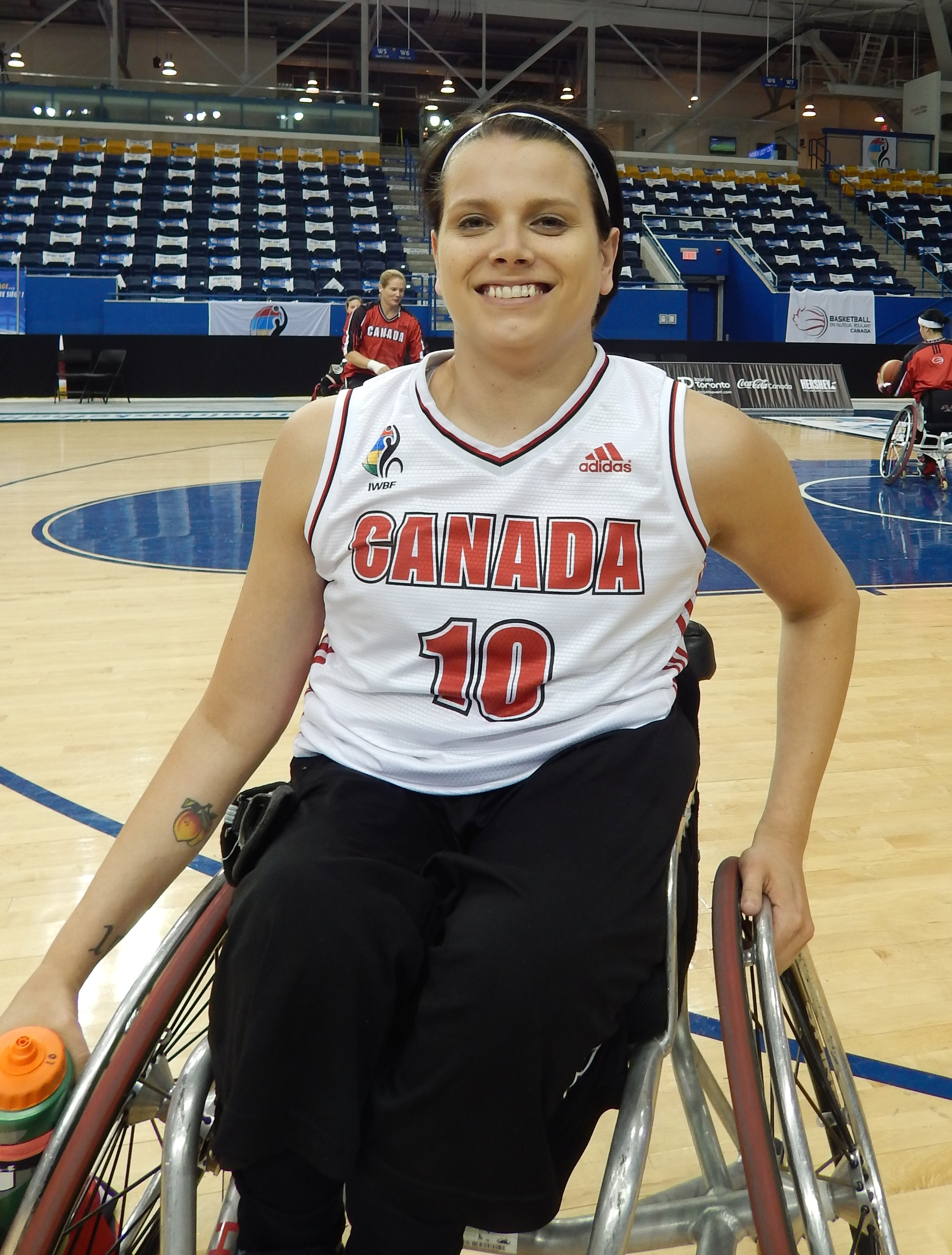
- Team Canada - No 10 - Katie Harnock

Personal information
- Nationality: Canada
- Born: August 12, 1983 (age 43) Kitchener, Ontario, Canada
- Height: 4 ft 6 in (1.37 m)

Sport
- Country: Canada
- Sport: Wheelchair basketball
- Disability class: 2.0
- Event: Women's team
- College team: University of Alabama
Medal record
World Championships
Gold medal – first place	2002 Kitakyushu	Team
Gold medal – first place	2014 Toronto	Team
Bronze medal – third place	2010 Birmingham	Team
Parapan American Games
Silver medal – second place	2007 Rio de Janeiro	Team
Silver medal – second place	2011 Guadalajara	Team
Silver medal – second place	2015 Toronto	Team

Katie Harnock (/ˈhɑːrnɒk/ HAR-nok; born August 12, 1983) is a Canadian 2.0 point Paralympic wheelchair basketball player.

== Biography ==
Katie Harnock was born in Kitchener, Ontario, on August 12, 1983. She attended St. David Catholic Secondary School. She commenced playing wheelchair basketball in 1993, when she was just 10 years old, after she received a local club's brochure in the mail. She joined her local team in Kitchener when she was 13. In 1998 she was named the Junior Female Athlete of the Year by the Ontario Wheelchair Sports Association. She joined the senior national team in 2006, and made her Paralympic debut at the 2008 Summer Paralympic Games in Beijing, where Canada came fifth. In 2012, she participated in the 2012 Summer Paralympic Games in London, where Canada came sixth. She attended the University of Alabama, where she studied English, graduating in 2013.

Harnock was part of the team that won a gold medal at the 2014 Women's World Wheelchair Basketball Championship in Toronto in July 2014, and silver at the 2015 Parapan American Games in August 2015.

Paralympic Games
Competition	Season	M	FGM-A	FG%	3PM-A	3P%	FTM-A	FT%	TOT	AST	PTS
Paralympic Games	2012	7	35-77	46	1-9	11	0-0	0	27	24	73
Paralympic Games	2008	7	14-32	44	1-2	50	0-0	0	12	7	31

Key
FGM, FGA, FG%: field goals made, attempted and percentage	3PM, 3PA, 3P%: three-point field goals made, attempted and percentage
FTM, FTA, FT%: free throws made, attempted and percentage	OR, DR: offensive, defensive rebounds
PTS: points	AST: assists

== Awards ==
- Queen Elizabeth II Diamond Jubilee Medal (2013)
