= Clare Griffiths (basketball) =

British wheelchair basketball player

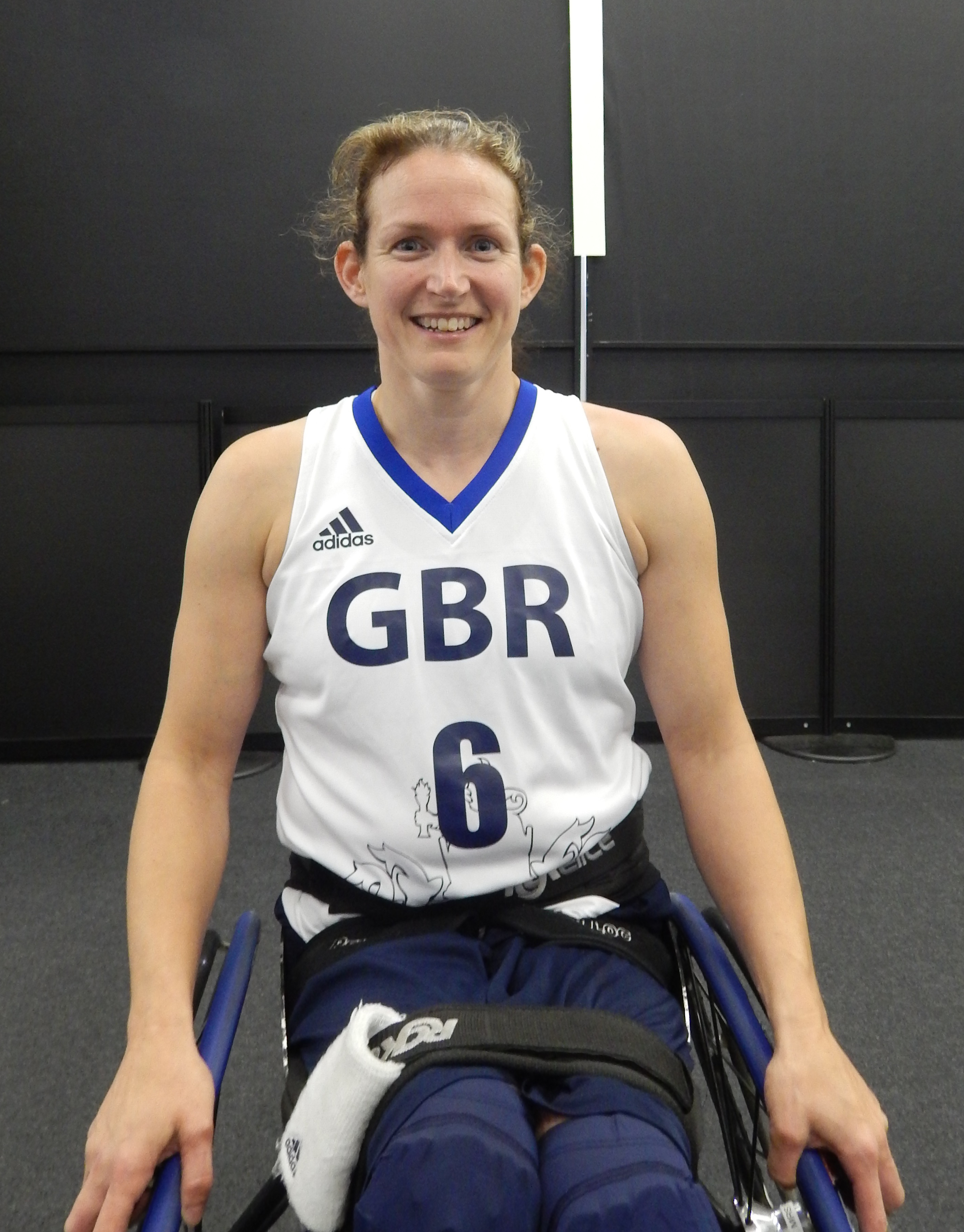
- Clare Griffiths at the 2016 Paralympic Games in Rio de Janeiro

Personal information
- Nationality: Great Britain
- Born: 18 September 1979 (age 46) High Wycombe, Buckinghamshire
- Height: 167 cm (5 ft 6 in)
- Weight: 56 kg (8 st 11 lb)

Sport
- Country: Great Britain
- Sport: Wheelchair basketball
- Disability class: 1.5
- Event: Women's team
- Club: Coyotes
Medal record
Wheelchair basketball
European Championships
Bronze medal – third place	1999 Roermond, Netherlands	Women's wheelchair basketball
Bronze medal – third place	2003 Hamburg, Germany	Women's wheelchair basketball
Bronze medal – third place	2007 Wetzlar, Netherlands	Women's wheelchair basketball
Bronze medal – third place	2009 Stoke Mandeville, United Kingdom	Women's wheelchair basketball
Bronze medal – third place	2011 Nazareth, Israel	Women's wheelchair basketball
Bronze medal – third place	2013 Frankfurt, Germany	Women's wheelchair basketball
Bronze medal – third place	2015 Worcester, United Kingdom	Women's wheelchair basketball

Clare Griffiths née Strange (born 18 September 1979) is a 1.5 point British wheelchair basketball player who represented Great Britain at the 2000, 2004, 2008, 2012 and 2016 Paralympic Games.

== Biography ==
Clare Strange was born in High Wycombe, Buckinghamshire, England, on 18 September 1979, the daughter of Jeremy and Caroline Strange. She played county hockey, and represented her school in the National Indoor Championships. She also rode horses, representing southern England at the Mounted Games in 1996 and 1997. In 1997, she broke her back in a fall from a horse, rendering her paraplegic. She was introduced to wheelchair basketball during rehabilitation at Stoke Mandeville Hospital. A year later, she made her international debut as a 1.5 point player for Team Great Britain at the Wheelchair Basketball World Championship in Sydney, Australia.

Since then, Strange, who married Daniel Griffiths on 13 July 2013 at St Mary's Church in Radnage, and is now known as Clare Griffiths, has represented Britain at the 2000 2004, 2008, 2012 and 2016 Paralympic Games. In London in 2012, she was co-captain of the team, along with Louise Sugden. In Rio de Janeiro in 2016, although no longer captain, she was, at 36, the oldest member of the side. She also earned seven bronze medals at European championships, and played professional wheelchair basketball in Italy with Sardinia Sassari, one of the first British women to do so. She also earned a bachelor's degree in Sport and Exercise Science from Loughborough University in 2003.

In May 2016, she was named as part of the team for the 2016 Summer Paralympics in Rio de Janeiro. The British team produced its best ever performance at the Paralympics, making it all the way to the semi-finals, but lost to the semi-final to the United States, and then the bronze medal match to the Netherlands.

== Achievements ==
- 1998: Seventh at Wheelchair Basketball World Championship (Sydney, Australia)
- 1999: Bronze at European Wheelchair Basketball Championship (Roermond, Netherlands)
- 2000: Eighth at 2000 Paralympic Games (Sydney, Australia)
- 2002: Eighth at Wheelchair Basketball World Championship (Kitakyushu, Japan)
- 2003: Bronze at European Wheelchair Basketball Championship (Hamburg, Germany)
- 2004: Eighth at 2004 Paralympic Games (Athens, Greece)
- 2005: Fourth at European Wheelchair Basketball Championship (Villeneuve-d'Ascq, France)
- 2007: Bronze at European Wheelchair Basketball Championship (Wetzlar, Netherlands)
- 2008: Eighth at 2008 Paralympic Games (Beijing, China)
- 2009: Bronze at European Wheelchair Basketball Championship (Stoke Mandeville, United Kingdom)
- 2010: Sixth at 2010 Wheelchair Basketball World Championship (Birmingham, United Kingdom)
- 2011: Bronze at European Wheelchair Basketball Championship (Nazareth, Israel)
- 2012: Seventh at 2012 Paralympic Games (London, United Kingdom)
- 2013: Bronze at European Championships (Frankfurt, Germany)
- 2014: Fifth at the World Wheelchair Basketball Championship (Toronto, Canada)
- 2015: Bronze at the European Championships (Worcester, England)
