= Gesche Schünemann =

German wheelchair basketball player (1982-)

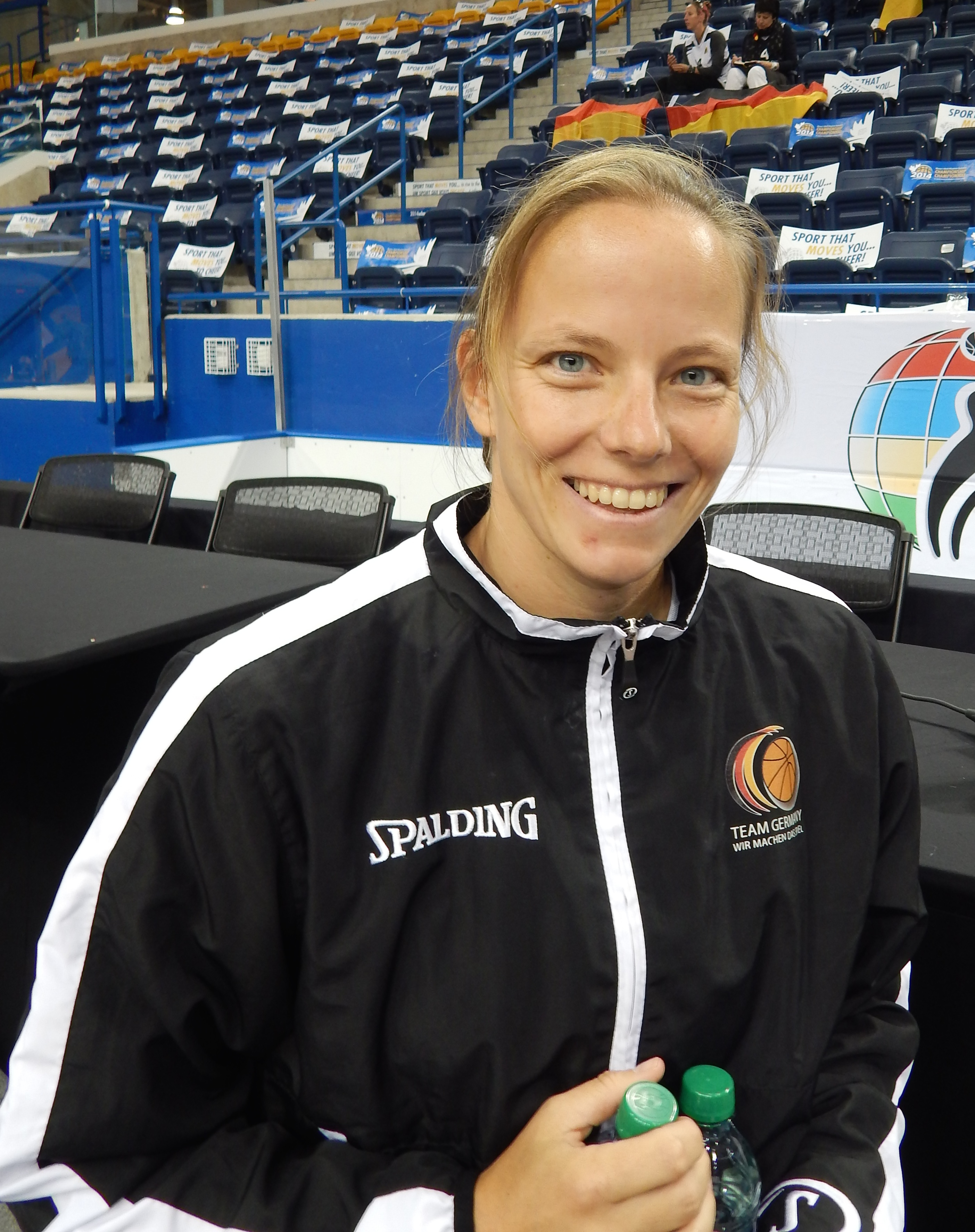
- Schünemann at the 2014 Women's World Wheelchair Basketball Championship in Toronto

Personal information
- Born: 18 November 1982 (age 43) Giessen, Germany
- Height: 175 cm (69 in)

Sport
- Country: Germany
- Sport: Wheelchair basketball
- Disability class: 4.5
- Event: Women's team
- Club: RSV Lahn-Dill (2008–2013); BG Baskets Hamburg (2013–2016)
- Retired: 2018

Achievements and titles
- Paralympic finals: 2008 Summer Paralympics; 2012 Summer Paralympics; 2016 Summer Paralympics
Medal record
Women's wheelchair basketball
Representing Germany
Paralympic Games
Gold medal – first place	2012 London	Team competition
Silver medal – second place	2008 Beijing	Team competition
Silver medal – second place	2016 Rio de Janeiro	Team competition
World Championship
Silver medal – second place	2010 Birmingham	Team competition
Silver medal – second place	2014 Toronto	Team competition
European Championships
Gold medal – first place	2007 Wetzlar	Team competition
Gold medal – first place	2009 Stoke Mandeville	Team competition
Gold medal – first place	2011 Nazareth	Team competition
Silver medal – second place	2013 Frankfurt	Team competition
Gold medal – first place	2015 Worcester	Team competition

Gesche Schünemann (born 18 November 1982) is a German former wheelchair basketball player and Paralympian who was part of the team that took the silver medal in the women's wheelchair basketball at the 2008 Summer Paralympics in Beijing, and the gold medal-winning team in wheelchair basketball at the 2012 Summer Paralympics in London.

After a promising basketball career was cut short by an Anterior cruciate ligament injury when she was a teenager, Schünemann took up wheelchair basketball, playing her first game in 2000. She went on to win five national championships with RSV Lahn-Dill. She began training with the national team in November 2005, and made her international debut at the European championships in 2007.

== Biography ==
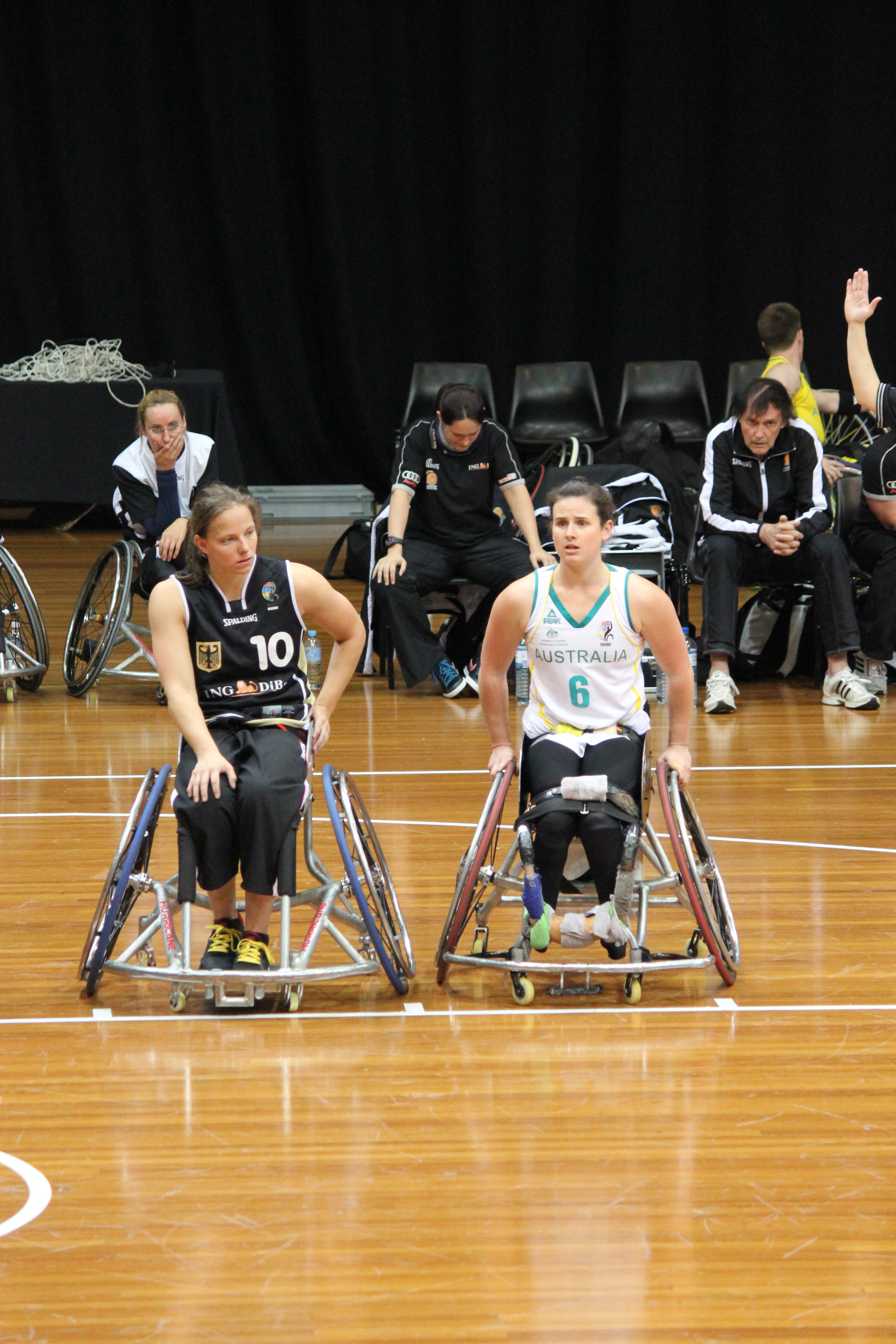
Schünemann (left) with Australia's Bridie Kean (right) in Sydney in July 2012. Neither uses a wheelchair off the basketball court.

Gesche Schünemann was born in Gießen on 18 November 1982. She was a swimmer and basketball player. Playing in a seconds game against TSV Grünberg, she was knocked down by Magdalena von Geyr, resulting in a torn anterior cruciate ligament and cartilage damage. Several operations failed to restore her knee to a state where she could play professional basketball, although she is still able to walk.

This ended Schünemann's basketball career for a time. She moved to Tübingen, where she studied sports management with a focus on sports marketing at the University of Tübingen. In 2012, she worked full-time as a marketing consultant for an energy company. Schünemann did some coaching and played for the regional league, but her knee still bothered her and national league offers were cancelled.

Andreas Joneck, who later became the manager of RSV Lahn-Dill persuaded Schünemann to try wheelchair basketball. She began playing for the seconds on her 18th birthday. RSV Lahn-Dill went on to win the national championship in 2008, 2010, 2011, 2012 and 2013, with Schünemann playing forward. In 2013, Schünemann moved to Hamburg, where her boyfriend Christian lives, and now plays forward-center for BG Baskets Hamburg, a mixed gender team. In April 2014, she was part of the BG Baskets Hamburg team that won the International Wheelchair Basketball Federation Euro League Challenge Cup, its first International title.

In November 2005, Schünemann began training with the national team. She made her international debut at the European championships in 2007. The German national team won gold at the European championships, and went on to win it again in 2009 and 2011 before losing to the Netherlands in 2013. In September 2008, she participated in the 2008 Summer Paralympics in Beijing, but Germany was beaten in the gold medal game by the United States team, taking home Paralympic silver medals instead. After the Paralympics, the team's performance was considered impressive enough for it to be named the national "Team of the Year", and it received the Silver Laurel Leaf, Germany's highest sporting honour, from German President Horst Köhler.

The German team hoped for a rematch against the United States at the 2012 Summer Paralympics in London, but instead faced the team that had beaten the Americans, the Australia women's national wheelchair basketball team. They defeated the Australians in front of a crowd of over 12,000 to win the gold medal, Gesche Schünemann the first time that Germany had won in women's wheelchair basketball at the Paralympics since 1984. They were awarded a second Silver Laurel Leaf by President Joachim Gauck in November 2012, and were again named Team of the Year for 2012.

After the Paralympics, Schünemann was required to rest for three months after surgery to repair the damaged tendons of the little right finger, but returned for the European Championships in 2013, which Germany lost to the Netherlands. In 2014, she won silver at the 2014 Women's World Wheelchair Basketball Championship in Toronto, where the German team was defeated by Canada in the final. The German team beat the Netherlands in the 2015 European Championships, to claim its tenth European title. At the 2016 Paralympic Games, it won silver after losing the final to the United States.

She retired from wheelchair basketball in 2016 and from the national team in 2018.

== Achievements ==
- 2007: Gold European Championships (Wetzlar, Germany)
- 2008: Silver Paralympic Games (Beijing, China)
- 2009: Gold European Championships (Stoke Mandeville, England)
- 2010: Silver World Championships (Birmingham, England)
- 2011: Gold European Championships (Nazareth, Israel)
- 2012: Gold Paralympic Games (London, England)
- 2013: Silver European Championships (Frankfurt, Germany)
- 2014: Silver at the World Championships (Toronto, Canada)
- 2015: Gold at the European Championships (Worcester, England)
- 2016: Silver at the Paralympic Games (Rio de Janeiro, Brazil)

== Awards ==
- 2008: Team of the Year
- 2008: Silver Laurel Leaf
- 2012: Team of the Year
- 2012: Silver Laurel Leaf
