= Cher Korver =

Dutch wheelchair basketball player

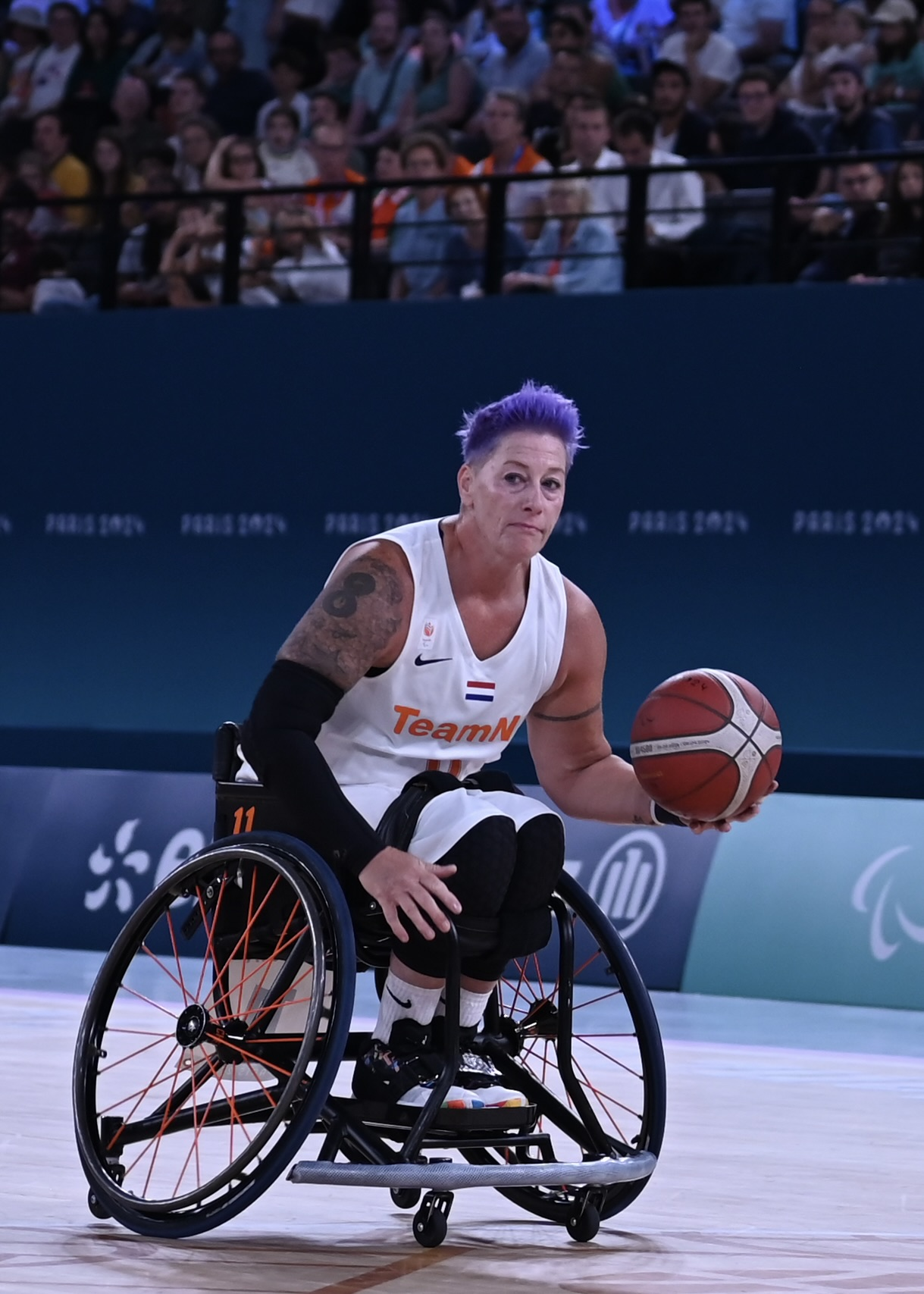

Personal information
- Born: 11 August 1976 (age 50) Amersfoort, Netherlands

Sport
- Country: Netherlands
- Sport: Wheelchair basketball
- Disability: impaired muscle power
- Disability class: 2.5
Medal record
Women's wheelchair basketball
Representing the Netherlands
Paralympic Games
Gold medal – first place	2020 Tokyo	Team
Gold medal – first place	2024 Paris	Team
Bronze medal – third place	2016 Rio de Janeiro	Team
Bronze medal – third place	2012 London	Team
World Championships
Gold medal – first place	2018 Hamburg	Team
Bronze medal – third place	2014 Toronto	Team
Bronze medal – third place	2026 Ottawa	Team
European Championships
Gold medal – first place	2017 Tenerife	Team
Gold medal – first place	2019 Rotterdam	Team

Cher Korver (born 11 August 1976) is a Dutch wheelchair basketball player (2.5 disability class) and a member of the Netherlands women's national wheelchair basketball team.

== Career ==
With the national team she competed at six consecutive Summer Paralympics between 2000 and 2020. She won with the team the gold medal at the 2020 Summer Paralympics, and the bronze medal at the 2012 Summer Paralympics and 2016 Summer Paralympics. She became world champion in 2018 and European champion in 2017 and 2019.

== Personal life ==
Korver was born in Amersfoort on 11 August 1976. She has impaired muscle power in her legs since she is 19 years old. started with playing wheelchair basketball in 1997. She made her debut for the national team in 1998 Wheelchair Basketball World Championship. She competed at the 2008 Paralympic World Cup.

She was awarded the Rob Verheuvel Award for her contribution to wheelchair basketball in 2014. She lives in Nijkerk.
