= Janet McLachlan =

Canadian wheelchair basketball player

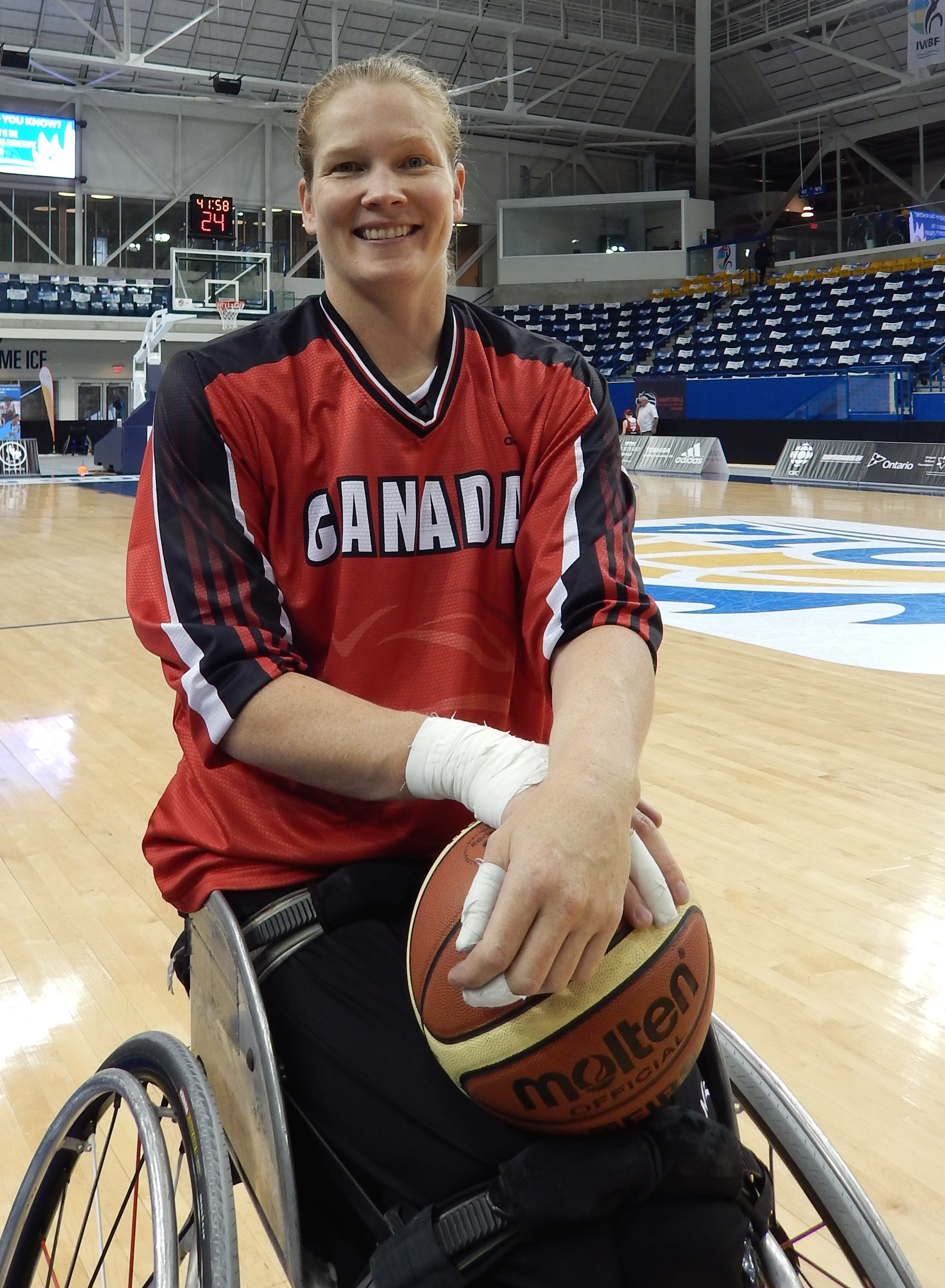
- Team Canada – No 5 – Janet McLachlan

Personal information
- Nationality: Canada
- Born: August 26, 1977 (age 49) North Vancouver, British Columbia
- Height: 6 ft 0 in (1.83 m)

Sport
- Sport: Wheelchair basketball
- Disability class: 4.5
- Event: Women's team
- Club: BC Breakers, Giulianova
- Coached by: Bill Johnson
Medal record
World Championships
Gold medal – first place	2014 Toronto	Women's wheelchair basketball
Bronze medal – third place	2010 Birmingham	Women's wheelchair basketball
Parapan American Games
Silver medal – second place	2011 Guadalajara	Women's wheelchair basketball
Silver medal – second place	2015 Toronto	Women's wheelchair basketball

Janet Margaret McLachlan (born August 26, 1977) is a Canadian 4.5 point wheelchair basketball player who won a bronze medal at the 2010 Wheelchair Basketball World Championship in Birmingham, and gold at the 2014 Women's World Wheelchair Basketball Championship in Toronto.

== Biography ==
Janet Margaret McLachlan was born in North Vancouver, British Columbia, on August 26, 1977. She was born into a family with a long history of participation in sports. Her father played Canadian football for the University of British Columbia, was drafted by the Canadian Football League, and played rugby in British Columbia and New Zealand. Her mother won both the Canadian over-65 singles and over-65 doubles tennis championships in 2009, and represented Canada at the World Senior Tennis Championships. McLachlan attended the University of Victoria, earning a Bachelor of Science degree, and the University of Alberta, where she earned a Bachelor of Education degree.

McLachlan played basketball for the University of Victoria Vikes from 1995 to 2000, during which time they won national championships in 1998 and 2000. She was also a member of the Canadian International University Sports Federation (FISU) Games team in Beijing in 2001. In addition, she played rugby with the Team Canada A and B squads from 2002 to 2005. In an attempt to gain selection for the Canadian national team for the 2006 Women's Rugby World Cup, she badly mangled her knee.

An Edmonton Rockers teammate suggested that McLachlan try playing wheelchair basketball in order to stay fit while recovering, and put McLachlan in touch with Danielle Peers of the Edmonton Inferno. She made the national team in 2008, in time to participate in the 2008 Summer Paralympic Games in Beijing. She then went to the University of Alabama, one of five universities in the United States with a wheelchair basketball team. She studied interior design, and became particularly interested in residential design incorporating accessibility and longevity. The University of Alabama gave her the opportunity to practice and hone her wheelchair basketball skills. In return, she helped the University of Alabama's Crimson Tide win back-to-back Championships in 2009 and 2010. She was named the tournament MVP in 2010.

McLachlan was part of the Canadian team that won bronze at the 2010 Wheelchair Basketball World Championship in Birmingham, England, where she was top scorer and rebounder in any team, with seven double-doubles in seven games. Afterwards she accepted an offer to join the Trier Dolphins in Germany in 2010, playing along with Canadian teammate Tara Feser. In 2012, she signed with Giulianova in the Italian Wheelchair Basketball League. She again led all players in scores and rebounds at the 2012 Summer Paralympics in London. She still played for the BC Breakers as well from 2006, and was named MVP at the 2010, 2012 and 2014 tournaments. She was part of the team that won a gold medal at the 2014 Women's World Wheelchair Basketball Championship in Toronto in July 2014, and silver at the 2015 Parapan American Games in August 2015.

In 2013, McLachlan won first place in the Stanley Park Open wheelchair tennis tournament in the women's singles division.

Statistics
Competition	Season	Matches	FGM-A	FG%	3PM-A	3P%	FTM-A	FT%	OR-DR	AST	PTS	Source
World Championship	2014	8	76-129	59	3-8	38	17-24	71	19-114	29	172	
Paralympic Games	2012	7	76-134	57	0-5	0	30-42	71	21-96	13	182	
World Championship	2010	7	75-145	52	1-14	7	24-30	80	20-103	24	175	
Paralympic Games	2008	7	27-51	53	1-3	33	3-5	60	10-29	1	58	

Key
FGM, FGA, FG%: field goals made, attempted and percentage	3PM, 3PA, 3P%: three-point field goals made, attempted and percentage
FTM, FTA, FT%: free throws made, attempted and percentage	OR, DR: offensive, defensive rebounds
PTS: points	AST: assists

== Awards ==
- Queen Elizabeth II Diamond Jubilee Medal (2013)
- Wheelchair Basketball Canada Female Athlete of the Year (2011)
- BC Wheelchair Basketball Female Athlete of the Year (2009)
