= Floralia Estrada Bernal =

Mexican Paralympic athlete (born 1990)

Personal information
- Born: 8 August 1990 (age 35)

Sport
- Country: Mexico
- Sport: Para-athletics; wheelchair basketball
- Disability: Limb deficiency
- Disability class: T54; F57
- Events: 4 × 100 m; discus throw; shot put
Medal record
Women's para-athletics
Representing Mexico
World Championships
Bronze medal – third place	2017 London	Discus throw F57
Bronze medal – third place	2025 New Delhi	Discus throw F57
Parapan American Games
Gold medal – first place	2019 Lima	Discus throw F57

Floralia Estrada Bernal (born 8 August 1990) is a Mexican para-athlete, who competes in the T54/F57 classes. These are classes for sedentary athletes in para-athletics.

She represents the club DIF Nacional, and is coached by Ivan Rodríguez Luna. She trains at the Mexican Paralympic Training Center (CEPAMEX) in Mexico City.

== Early life ==
Estrada was hit by a car when she was 6 years old, and had to have both legs amputated. She started with para sports when she was 15 years old, and has done both swimming and wheelchair basketball before she chose to focus only on athletics from 2015.

== Sports career ==
Estrada participated in wheelchair basketball during the 2008 Summer Paralympics, where Mexico came ninth out of ten teams. She also participated in athletics; she ran the 4 x 100 meter relay, in which Mexico was disqualified. She competed in wheelchair basketball at the 2012 Summer Paralympics, where Mexico finished eighth after losing the seventh and eighth-place playoffs to Great Britain.

When Mexico failed to qualify in wheelchair basketball during the 2016 Summer Paralympics, Estrada decided to focus only on para-athletics. She participated in the discus during the 2016 Paralympics in Rio de Janeiro, and came fifth there. The following year, she participated in the 2017 World Para Athletics Championships, where she won bronze in the discus in the F57 class, behind Nassima Saifi and Orla Barry, and she set a new area record for the Americas there with 27.76 metres.

Estrada participated in the 2019 Parapan American Games in Lima, Peru, and won the discus in the F57 class. During the 2019 World Para Athletics Championships, she came fourth in the discus. As of November 2019, she holds the Americas discus record in class F57, with 30.35 metres.
