= 2010 Wheelchair Basketball World Championship squads =

The following is the list of squads for each of the 12 men's and 10 women's teams competing in the 2010 Wheelchair Basketball World Championship, held in Great Britain between July 7 and July 17, 2010. Each team selected a squad of 12 players for the tournament.

Athletes are given an eight-level-score specific to wheelchair basketball, ranging from 0.5 to 4.5. Lower scores represent a higher degree of disability. The sum score of all players on the court cannot exceed 14.

== Men ==
=== Group A ===
==== Great Britain ====
Head coach: Murray Treseder

#	Name	Class.
4	Gaz Choudry	4.0
5	Simon Brown	2.0
6	Kevin Hayes	1.0
7	Terry Bywater	4.5
8	Simon Munn	4.0
9	Jon Pollock	2.5
10	Abdi Jama	1.0
11	Matt Sealy	2.0
12	Ian Sagar	3.0
13	Daniel Highcock	4.5
14	Jon Hall	3.0
15	Ade Orogbemi	2.5

==== Italy ====
Head coach: Malik Abes

#	Name	Class.
4	Fabio Raimondi	2.0
5	Mohamed Bargo	4.0
6	Amine Moukhariq	3.0
7	Nicola Damiano	1.0
8	Galliano Marchionni	4.5
9	Vincenzo Di Bennardo	3.0
10	Damiano Airoldi	1.0
11	Alberto Pellegrini	4.5
12	Matteo Cavagini	4.5
13	Stefano Rossetti	4.0
14	Roberto Cerisicioli	1.0
15	Ali Mohamed Sanna	1.5

==== Japan ====
Head coach: Yoshiaki Iwasa

#	Name	Class.
4	Shingo Fujii	1.5
5	Tomoi Masubuchi	3.0
6	Kazuyuki Tokairin	1.0
7	Tsunekazu Tanaka	3.0
8	Satoshi Sato	1.0
9	Akimasa Suzuki	3.5
10	Kazuyuki Kyoya	1.0
11	Akira Toyoshima	2.0
12	Masato Nakazawa	4.0
13	Tetsuya Miyajima	4.0
14	Daisuke Tsuchiko	4.0
15	Reo Fujimoto	4.5

==== Poland ====
Head coach: Piotr Luszynski

#	Name	Class.
4	Slawomir Gorzkorwicz	3.0
5	Mateusz Filipski	4.0
6	Andrzej Macek	1.5
7	Krzysztof Pietrzyk	1.0
8	Piotr Pawelko	2.0
9	Marcin Wrobel	1.5
10	Krzysztof Bandura	4.0
11	Piotr Luszynski	4.5
12	Marcin Balcerowski	1.0
13	Rafal Tyburowski	4.0
14	Robert Wisnik	4.0
15	Jan Cyrul	3.0

==== South Korea ====
Head coach: Sa-Hyun Han

#	Name	Class.
4	Ho-Yong Kim	3.0
5	Dong-Hyeon Kim	4.0
6	Hee-Yong Chol	2.0
7	Dong-Suk Oh	2.0
8	Kwang-Yub Ko	2.0
9	Chul-Soo Kim	4.5
10	Seung-Hyiin Cho	4.0
11	Chi-Won Lee	2.5
12	Sang-Ha Baek	1.0
13	Young-Dong Seo	4.0
14	Ji-Nam Kim	4.0
15	Se-Hoon Bang	1.0

==== United States ====
Head coach: James Glatch

#	Name	Class.
4	Eric Barber	1.0
5	Michael Paye	3.0
6	Matthew Lesperance	1.0
7	Nathan Hinze	4.5
8	Jacob Counts	3.5
9	William Waller	3.0
10	Matthew Scott	3.5
11	Steven Serio	3.5
12	Jason Nelms	2.5
13	Jeremy Lade	2.5
14	Paul Schulte	3.0
15	Joseph Chambers	4.0

=== Group B ===
==== Algeria ====
Head coach: Mohamed Tahar Kisrane

#	Name	Class.
4	Omar Zidi	4.0
5	Fateh Benkhedda	4.5
6	Ahmed Djaidjaa	1.0
7	Samir Daoudi	3.0
8	Zoheir Boulafa	4.0
9	Nabil Guidoune	4.0
10	Allel Ait Ahmed	2.0
11	Lakhdar Badache	2.0
12	Samir Laadjadjat	3.5
13	Abderazak Zaoui	2.0
14	Abdenour Gharboudj	1.0
15	Billel Ayache	3.5

==== Australia ====
Head coach: Ben Ettridge

#	Name	Class.
4	Justin Eveson	4.5
5	Bill Latham	4.0
6	Brett Stibners	4.0
7	Shaun Norris	3.0
8	Michael Hartnett	1.0
9	Tristan Knowles	4.0
10	John Mcphail	3.0
11	Tige Simmons	1.0
12	Grant Mizens	2.0
13	Dylan Alcott	1.0
14	Jeremy Doyle	1.0
15	Brad Ness	4.5

==== Canada ====
Head coach: Jerry Tonello

#	Name	Class.
4	Dave Durepos	3.5
5	Ross MacDonald	4.0
6	Robert (Bo) Hedges	2.5
7	Richard Peter	2.5
8	Joey Johnson	4.5
9	Adam Lancia	4.5
10	Abdi Dini Fatah	1.0
11	Chad Jassman	1.5
12	Brandon Wagner	1.0
13	Tyler Miller	1.5
14	Mikael Poulin	3.5
15	David Eng	4.5

==== France ====
Head coach: Franck Belen

#	Name	Class.
4	Ludovic Sarron	1.0
5	Frederic Guyot	2.0
6	Jerome Duran	2.0
7	Jerome Courneil	2.0
8	Franck Etavard	4.0
9	Bertrand Libman	3.0
10	David Levrat	4.0
11	Laurent Blasczak	3.5
12	Nicolas Jouanserre	4.5
13	Sofyane Mehiaoui	3.0
14	Roger Deda	3.5
15	Audrey Cayol	1.5

==== Mexico ====
Head coach: Aaron Davila

#	Name	Class.
4	Victor Castaneda	1.0
5	Eduardo Prieto	4.0
6	Francisco Lugo	1.0
7	Luis Cristen	1.5
8	Luis Blancss	3.0
9	Pablo Vazquez	2.0
10	Edgar Perdomo	3.0
11	Saul Garcia	2.5
12	Carlos Diaz	3.5
13	Sergio Martinez	4.0
14	Raul Ortega	3.5
15	Salvador Zavala	4.0

==== Turkey ====
Head coach: Remzi Sedat Incesu

#	Name	Class.
4	Ismail Boyraz	2.5
5	Ozgur Gurbulak	4.0
6	Firkri Gundogdu	1.0
7	Ali Asker Turan	3.5
8	Ismail Ar	1.0
9	Cem Gezinci	4.5
10	Kaan Dalay	2.0
11	Volkan Aydeniz	4.5
12	Suayip Kablan	4.0
13	Ferit Gumus	3.0
14	Samet Toptas	4.5
15	Bestami Boz	1.5

== Women ==
=== Group A ===
==== Australia ====
Head coach: John Triscari

#	Name	Class.
4	Melanie Domaschenz	1.0
5	Cobi Crispin	4.0
6	Bridie Kean	4.0
7	Amber Merritt	4.5
8	Tina Mckenzie	3.0
9	Liesl Tesch	4.0
10	Clare Burzynski	1.0
11	Kylie Gauci	2.0
12	Shelley Chaplin	3.5
13	Sarah Stewart	3.0
14	Katie Hill	3.0
15	Leanne Del Toso	4.0

==== Canada ====
Head coach: Bill Johnson

#	Name	Class.
4	Elaine Allard	1.5
5	Janet McLachlan	4.5
6	Kendra Ohama	2.5
7	Cindy Ouellet	3.5
8	Nancy Lafleche	4.0
9	Chantal Benoit	3.5
10	Katie Harnock	2.5
11	Elisha Williams	4.5
12	Tracey Ferguson	3.0
13	Marni Abbott-Peter	1.0
14	Jessica Vliegenthar	1.0
15	Tara Feser	4.5

==== Great Britain ====
Head coach: Garry Peel

#	Name	Class.
4	Caroline Maclean	2.0
5	Fran Ray	2.5
6	Clare Strange	1.5
7	Helen Freeman	4.0
8	Laurie Williams	2.5
9	Judith Hamer	4.0
10	Amy Conroy	4.0
11	Madeleine Thompson	4.5
12	Helen Turner	3.5
13	Louise Sugden	2.5
14	Pauline Mcdonald	2.0
15	Caroline Matthews	4.5

==== Mexico ====
Head coach: ?

#	Name	Class.
4	Rosario Ventura	4.0
5	Patricia Rodriguez	2.0
6	Rocio Torres	3.5
7	Floralia Estrada	4.0
8	Anaisa Perez	2.5
9	Lucia Vazquez	4.0
10	Carmen Montano	4.0
11	Maria Guadalupe Magos	1.0
12	Claudia Magaly Miranda	3.0
13	Yasmina Suarez	3.0
14	Claudia De La Tor	1.0
15	Wendy Garcia	1.0

==== Netherlands ====
Head coach: Yvonne Lansink Rotgerink

#	Name	Class.
4	Inge Huitzing	4.5
5	Lucie Houwen	3.0
6	Jitske Visser	1.0
7	Roos Oosterbaam	1.5
8	?
9	Petra Garnier	4.5
10	Wendy van der Wal	3.5
11	Cher Korver	2.5
12	Saskia Pronk	1.0
13	Barbara van Bergen	2.0
14	Carina Versloot	3.0
15	Mariska Beijer	4.0

=== Group B ===
==== Brazil ====
Head coach: Ana Teixeira

#	Name	Class.
4	Geisiane Maia	3.0
5	Mariana Costa	3.0
6	Geisa Vieira	4.0
7	Elizabeth Gomes	1.0
8	Paola Klokler	4.0
9	Rosália Ramos	1.5
10	Monica Santos	4.5
11	Jessica Santana	2.5
12	Ana Aurélia Rosa	3.5
13	Dilma Fernandes	4.5
14	Zuila Ribeiro	1.5
15	Ozineide Pantoja	2.5

==== China ====
Head coach: Tiehua Liu

#	Name	Class.
4	Haizhen Cheng	4.5
5	Mingzhu Deng	2.0
6	Wenhua Hao	4.0
7	Yongqing Fu	4.0
8	Chao Yang	4.0
9	Yun Long	1.5
10	Damei Chen	3.0
11	Qiurong Chen	1.5
12	Weijiao Li	2.5
13	Yanhua Li	1.5
14	Yuhui Li	1.5
15	Yanli Zhang	1.0

==== Germany ====
Head coach: Holger Glinicki

#	Name	Class.
4	Mareike Adermann	4.5
5	Birgit Meitner	2.5
6	Simone Kues	1
7	Edina Müller	2.5
8	Annika Zeyen	1.5
9	Maria Kühn	1
10	Gesche Schünemann	4.5
11	Maya Lindholm	2
12	Annabel Breuer	1.5
13	Silke Bleifuß	4.5
14	Marina Mohnen	4.5
15	Heike Friedrich	4.5

==== Japan ====
Head coach: Tetsuhiro Kikuchi

#	Name	Class.
4	Erika Yoshida	1.0
5	Megumi Mashiko	3.0
6	Miki Uramoto	2.5
7	Yuki Soejima	1.0
8	Tomoe Soeda	3.5
9	Chika Uemura	3.5
10	Mayo Hagino	1.0
11	Mayumi Tsuchida	4.5
12	Ikumi Inoue	4.0
13	Yumi Takahashi	1.0
14	Tsuyuko Sasano	2.0
15	Mari Amimoto	4.5

==== United States ====
Head coach: David Kiley

#	Name	Class.
4	Rebecca Murray	2.5
5	Darlene Hunter	1.5
6	Jennifer Chew	1.5
7	Andrea Woodson-Smith	4.0
8	Natalie Schneider	4.5
9	Desiree Miller	3.5
10	Stephanie Wheeler	2.0
11	Sarah Castle	2.5
12	Christina Ripp	2.5
13	Caitlin Mcdermott	1.0
14	Mary Allison Milford	1.0
15	Carlee Hoffman	4.0

== See also ==
- 2010 FIBA World Championship squads
- 2010 FIBA World Championship for Women squads
