= 2010 Wheelchair Basketball World Championship =

- Venue: National Indoor Arena
- Location: Birmingham
- Start date: 7 July
- End date: 17 July
- Competitors: 12 teams (men); 10 teams (women) from 16 nations

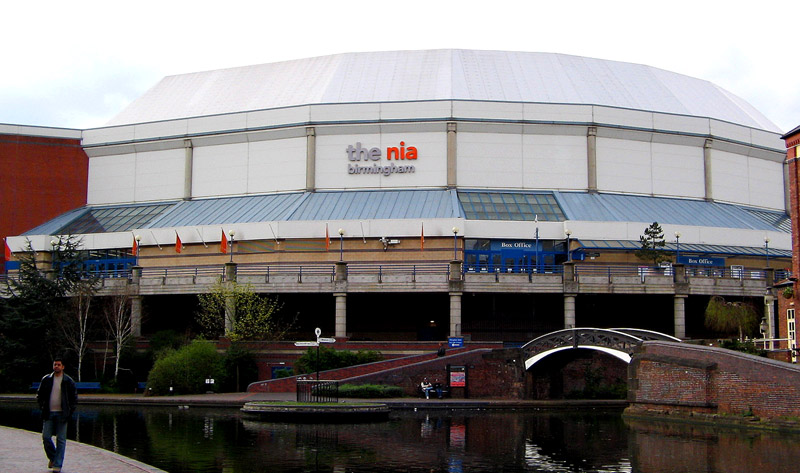
The Championship was staged at Birmingham's National Indoor Arena.

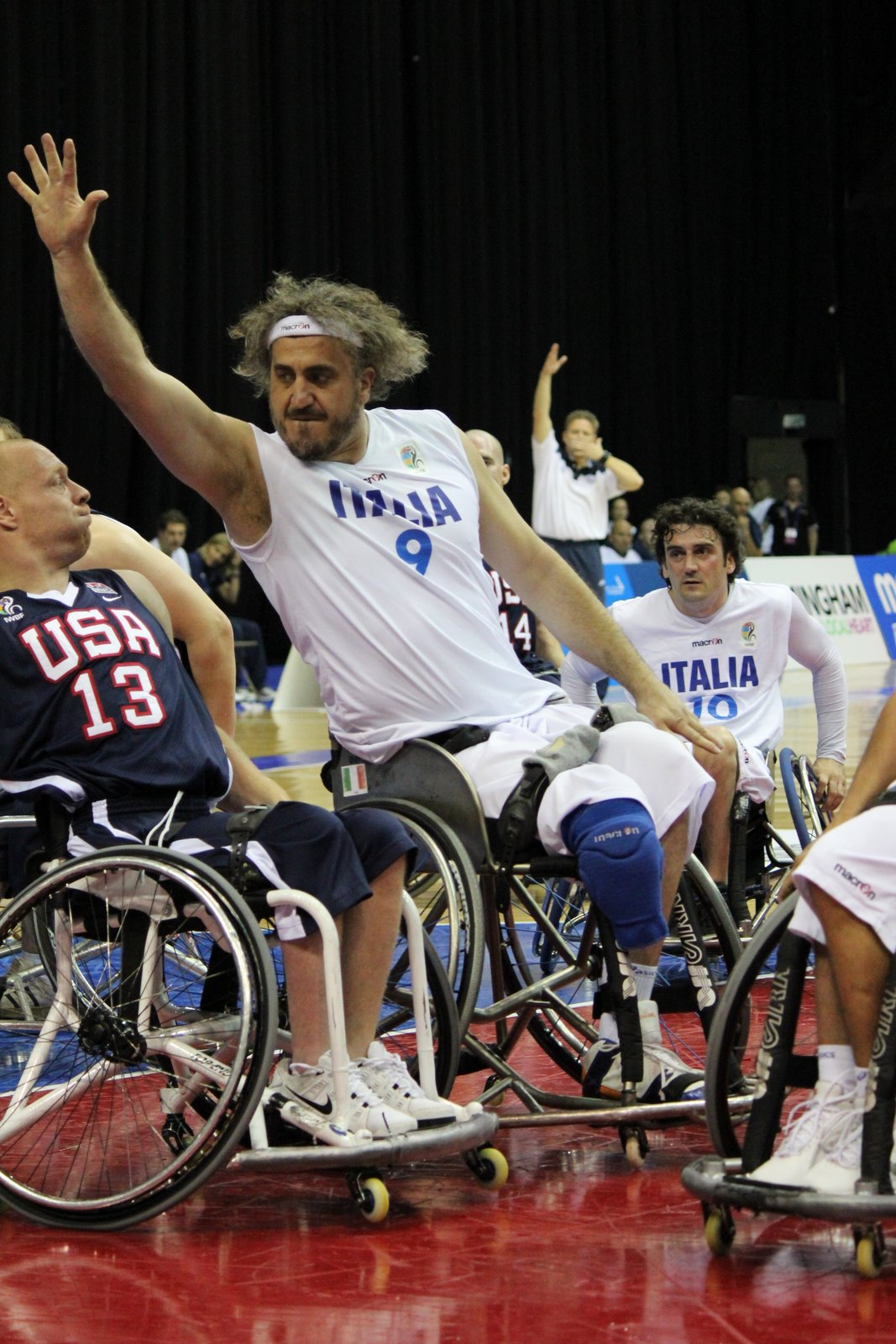
#9 Vincenzo Di Bennardo, Italy vs USA, Men's Bronze Medal Game

The 2010 Wheelchair Basketball World Championship was held in Birmingham, Great Britain from 7 to 17 July 2010. Both the men's and women's tournaments were held. The Championships was a qualifying event for the London 2012 Paralympic Games.

== Medalists ==
Event	Gold	Silver	Bronze
Men's team	Australia (AUS) Dylan Alcott; Jeremy Doyle; Justin Eveson; Michael Hartnett; Tristan Knowles; Bill Latham; John Mcphail; Grant Mizens; Brad Ness; Shaun Norris; Tige Simmons; Brett Stibners; Coach: Ben Ettridge	France (FRA) Laurent Blasczak; Audrey Cayol; Jerome Courneil; Roger Deda; Jerome Duran; Franck Etavard; Frederic Guyot; Nicolas Jouanserre; David Levrat; Bertrand Libman; Sofyane Mehiaoui; Ludovic Sarron; Coach: Franck Belen	United States (USA) Eric Barber; Joseph Chambers; Jacob Counts; Nathan Hinze; Jeremy Lade; Matthew Lesperance; Jason Nelms; Michael Paye; Paul Schulte; Matthew Scott; Steve Serio; William Waller; Coach: James Glatch
Women's team	United States (USA) Sarah Castle; Jennifer Chew; Carlee Hoffman; Darlene Hunter; Mary Allison Milford; Caitlin Mcdermott; Desiree Miller; Rebecca Murray; Christina Ripp; Natalie Schneider; Stephanie Wheeler; Andrea Woodson-Smith; Coach: David Kiley	Germany (GER) Mareike Adermann; Silke Bleifuß; Annabel Breuer; Heike Friedrich; Simone Kues; Maria Kühn; Maya Lindholm; Birgit Meitner; Marina Mohnen; Edina Müller; Gesche Schünemann; Annika Zeyen; Coach: Holger Glinicki	Canada (CAN) Marni Abbott-Peter; Elaine Allard; Chantal Benoit; Tracey Ferguson; Tara Feser; Katie Harnock; Nancy Lafleche; Janet McLachlan; Kendra Ohama; Cindy Ouellet; Jessica Vliegenthart; Elisha Williams; Coach: Bill Johnson

== Squads ==
Each of the 12 men's and 10 women's teams selected a squad of 12 players for the tournament.

Athletes are given an eight-level-score specific to wheelchair basketball, ranging from 0.5 to 4.5. Lower scores represent a higher degree of disability. The sum score of all players on the court cannot exceed 14.

== Men ==
=== Preliminary round ===
All times local (UTC)

==== Group A ====
Team	Pld	W	L	PF	PA	PD	Pts.
Great Britain	5	5	0	379	272	+107	10
United States	5	4	1	412	264	+148	9
Italy	5	3	2	308	327	−19	8
Poland	5	2	3	316	346	−30	7
Japan	5	1	4	297	377	−80	6
South Korea	5	0	5	269	395	−126	5

7 July 2010
Great Britain	87–43	South Korea	National Indoor Arena, Birmingham
8 July 2010
Italy	74–69	Poland	National Indoor Arena, Birmingham
Japan	59–74	Great Britain	National Indoor Arena, Birmingham
South Korea	67–92	United States	National Indoor Arena, Birmingham
9 July 2010
United States	83–34	Poland	National Indoor Arena, Birmingham
Japan	71–55	South Korea	National Indoor Arena, Birmingham
Great Britain	65–45	Italy	National Indoor Arena, Birmingham
10 July 2010
Poland	82–61	Japan	National Indoor Arena, Birmingham
United States	82–39	Italy	National Indoor Arena, Birmingham
11 July 2010
Japan	46–89	United States	National Indoor Arena, Birmingham
Italy	73–51	South Korea	National Indoor Arena, Birmingham
Poland	59–75	Great Britain	National Indoor Arena, Birmingham
12 July 2010
Great Britain	78–66	United States	National Indoor Arena, Birmingham
Italy	77–60	Japan	National Indoor Arena, Birmingham
South Korea	53–72	Poland	National Indoor Arena, Birmingham

==== Group B ====
Team	Pld	W	L	PF	PA	PD	Pts.
Australia	5	5	0	381	253	+128	10
Canada	5	4	1	339	287	+52	9
Turkey	5	2	3	337	327	+10	7
France	5	2	3	302	303	−1	7
Mexico	5	2	3	229	347	−118	7
Algeria	5	0	5	264	409	−145	5

8 July 2010
Turkey	83–52	Algeria	National Indoor Arena, Birmingham
Canada	68–45	Mexico	National Indoor Arena, Birmingham
Australia	75–63	France	National Indoor Arena, Birmingham
9 July 2010
France	54–57	Mexico	National Indoor Arena, Birmingham
Turkey	54–66	Australia	National Indoor Arena, Birmingham
Algeria	61–87	Canada	National Indoor Arena, Birmingham
10 July 2010
Australia	92–44	Algeria	National Indoor Arena, Birmingham
Canada	67–55	France	National Indoor Arena, Birmingham
Mexico	75–83	Turkey	National Indoor Arena, Birmingham
11 July 2010
Algeria	47–69	France	National Indoor Arena, Birmingham
Australia	81–43	Mexico	National Indoor Arena, Birmingham
Turkey	60–69	Canada	National Indoor Arena, Birmingham
12 July 2010
Mexico	79–61	Algeria	National Indoor Arena, Birmingham
France	61–57	Turkey	National Indoor Arena, Birmingham
Canada	49–67	Australia	National Indoor Arena, Birmingham

=== Knockout stage ===
Quarter-finals
14 July 2010
Australia	68
Poland	34
14 July 2010
United States	92
Turkey	50
14 July 2010
Canada	47
Italy	63
14 July 2010
Great Britain	50
France	59

Semi-finals
15 July 2010
Australia	68
United States	58
15 July 2010
Italy	58
France	63

Final
17 July 2010
Australia	79
France	69
Third place
17 July 2010
Italy	42
United States	71

==== 9th–12th playoffs ====
===== 9th–12th semifinals =====
14 July
9:30

Mexico	64–57	South Korea

National Indoor Arena, Birmingham

14 July
10:00

Japan	82–36	Algeria

National Indoor Arena, Birmingham

===== 11th place playoff =====
16 July
10:00

Algeria	51–64	South Korea

National Indoor Arena, Birmingham

===== 9th place playoff =====
16 July
11:45

Japan	59–63	Mexico

National Indoor Arena, Birmingham

==== 5th–8th playoffs ====
===== 5th–8th semifinals =====
15 July
14:15

Turkey	49–62	Poland

National Indoor Arena, Birmingham

15 July
16:15

Great Britain	67–51	Canada

National Indoor Arena, Birmingham

===== 7th place playoff =====
16 July
14:15

Canada	71–61	Turkey

National Indoor Arena, Birmingham

===== 5th place playoff =====
16 July
16:30

Great Britain	82–68	Poland

National Indoor Arena, Birmingham

==== Quarterfinals ====
14 July
11:45

Australia	68–34	Poland

National Indoor Arena, Birmingham

14 July
12:15

Canada	47–63	Italy

National Indoor Arena, Birmingham

14 July
16:15

Great Britain	50–59	France

National Indoor Arena, Birmingham

14 July
16:30

United States	92–50	Turkey

National Indoor Arena, Birmingham

==== Semifinals ====
15 July
12:15

Italy	58–63	France

National Indoor Arena, Birmingham

15 July
16:30

Australia	68–58	United States

National Indoor Arena, Birmingham

==== Bronze medal game ====
17 July
11:45

Italy	42–71	United States

National Indoor Arena, Birmingham

==== Final ====
17 July
16:15

Australia	79–69	France

National Indoor Arena, Birmingham

2010 Wheelchair Basketball World Championship

Australia
1st title

=== Final standings ===
Rank	Team
1	Australia
2	France
3	United States
4	Italy
5	Great Britain
6	Poland
7	Canada
8	Turkey
9	Mexico
10	Japan
11	South Korea
12	Algeria

== Women ==
=== Preliminary round ===
All times local (UTC)

==== Group A ====
Team	Pld	W	L	PF	PA	PD	Pts.
Australia	4	3	1	233	187	+46	7
Canada	4	3	1	233	206	+27	7
Netherlands	4	2	2	197	196	+1	6
Great Britain	4	1	3	184	191	−7	5
Mexico	4	1	3	188	255	−67	5

7 July 2010
Great Britain	38–39	Netherlands	National Indoor Arena, Birmingham
8 July 2010
Mexico	38–82	Australia	National Indoor Arena, Birmingham
Canada	54–49	Great Britain	National Indoor Arena, Birmingham
9 July 2010
Netherlands	54–58	Canada	National Indoor Arena, Birmingham
10 July 2010
Netherlands	47–56	Mexico	National Indoor Arena, Birmingham
Australia	48–40	Great Britain	National Indoor Arena, Birmingham
11 July 2010
Australia	44–57	Netherlands	National Indoor Arena, Birmingham
Mexico	37–51	Canada	National Indoor Arena, Birmingham
12 July 2010
Great Britain	57–50	Mexico	National Indoor Arena, Birmingham
Canada	52–59	Australia	National Indoor Arena, Birmingham

==== Group B ====
Team	Pld	W	L	PF	PA	PD	Pts.
United States	4	4	0	268	152	+116	8
Germany	4	3	1	273	192	+81	7
Japan	4	2	2	223	184	+39	6
China	4	1	3	198	277	−79	5
Brazil	4	0	4	112	269	−157	4

8 July 2010
Brazil	25–73	Germany	National Indoor Arena, Birmingham
United States	56–35	Japan	National Indoor Arena, Birmingham
9 July 2010
China	50–88	Germany	National Indoor Arena, Birmingham
Brazil	24–66	United States	National Indoor Arena, Birmingham
10 July 2010
United States	81–40	China	National Indoor Arena, Birmingham
Japan	69–22	Brazil	National Indoor Arena, Birmingham
11 July 2010
Japan	52–59	Germany	National Indoor Arena, Birmingham
Brazil	41–61	China	National Indoor Arena, Birmingham
12 July 2010
Germany	53–65	United States	National Indoor Arena, Birmingham
China	47–67	Japan	National Indoor Arena, Birmingham

=== Knockout stage ===
Quarter-finals
14 July 2010
United States	53
Great Britain	37
14 July 2010
Canada	62
Japan	39
14 July 2010
Australia	77
China	38
14 July 2010
Germany	63
Netherlands	40

Semi-finals
15 July 2010
United States	68
Canada	58
15 July 2010
Australia	47
Germany	66

Final
17 July 2010
United States	55
Germany	53
Third place
17 July 2010
Australia	49
Canada	59

==== 9th place playoff ====
16 July
12:15

Mexico	73–33	Brazil

National Indoor Arena, Birmingham

==== 5th–8th playoffs ====
===== 5th–8th semifinals =====
15 July
10:00

Netherlands	69–48	China

National Indoor Arena, Birmingham

15 July
11:45

Japan	31–46	Great Britain

National Indoor Arena, Birmingham

===== 7th place playoff =====
16 July
14:00

Japan	58–41	China

National Indoor Arena, Birmingham

===== 5th place playoff =====
16 July
16:15

Netherlands	58–43	Great Britain

National Indoor Arena, Birmingham

==== Quarterfinals ====
14 July
14:00

United States	53–37	Great Britain

National Indoor Arena, Birmingham

14 July
14:15

Germany	63–40	Netherlands

National Indoor Arena, Birmingham

14 July
18:30

Australia	77–38	China

National Indoor Arena, Birmingham

14 July
18:45

Canada	62–39	Japan

National Indoor Arena, Birmingham

==== Semifinals ====
15 July
14:00

Australia	47–66	Germany

National Indoor Arena, Birmingham

15 July
18:30

United States	68–58	Canada

National Indoor Arena, Birmingham

==== Bronze medal game ====
17 July
9:30

Australia	49–59	Canada

National Indoor Arena, Birmingham

==== Final ====
17 July
14:00

United States	55–53	Germany

National Indoor Arena, Birmingham

2010 Wheelchair Basketball World Championship

United States
2nd title

=== Final standings ===
Rank	Team
1	United States
2	Germany
3	Canada
4	Australia
5	Netherlands
6	Great Britain
7	Japan
8	China
9	Mexico
10	Brazil

== See also ==
- 2010 FIBA World Championship
- 2010 FIBA World Championship for Women
