= Canada women's national wheelchair basketball team =

Canada
- IWBF Ranking: 1st
- IWBF zone: Americas
- National federation: Wheelchair Basketball Canada
- Coach: Joey Johnson

Paralympic Games
- Appearances: 10
- Medals: :3:0:1

World Championships
- Medals: :5:1:2
Home	Away
Medal record
Paralympic Games
Gold medal – first place	1992 Barcelona	Team
Gold medal – first place	1996 Atlanta	Team
Gold medal – first place	2000 Sydney	Team
Bronze medal – third place	2004 Athens	Team
World Championships
Gold medal – first place	1994 Stoke Mandeville	Team
Gold medal – first place	1998 Sydney	Team
Gold medal – first place	2002 Kitakyushu	Team
Gold medal – first place	2006 Amsterdam	Team
Gold medal – first place	2014 Toronto	Team
Silver medal – second place	2026 Ottawa	Team
Bronze medal – third place	1990 Saint-Étienne	Team
Bronze medal – third place	2010 Birmingham	Team
Parapan American Games
Silver medal – second place	1986 Puerto Rico	Team
Silver medal – second place	2007 Rio de Janeiro	Team
Silver medal – second place	2011 Guadalajara	Team

The Canada women's national wheelchair basketball team is one of Canada's most successful national sporting teams. It is the only national women's wheelchair basketball team to have won three consecutive gold medals at the Paralympic Games in 1992, 1996 and 2000, and the only one to have won four consecutive World Wheelchair Basketball Championships, in 1994, 1998, 2002 and 2006. In 2014 it won a fifth World Championship.

== History ==
Wheelchair basketball has been played in Canada since the 1940s. A women's tournament was held at the 1968 Summer Paralympics in Tel Aviv, and a Canadian women's team participated in the 1972 Summer Paralympics.

The women's team went on to become one of Canada's most successful national sporting teams, rivalled only by the ice hockey teams. It is the only national women's wheelchair basketball team to have won three consecutive gold medals at the Paralympic Games and the only one to have won four consecutive World Wheelchair Basketball Championships,. In 2014 it won a fifth world championship at the 2014 Women's World Wheelchair Basketball Championship in Toronto.

In 2024 Michèle Sung, formerly coach of the University of Manitoba women's basketball team and previously an assistant coach of Wheelchair Basketball Canada's women's team, was appointed head coach of the Canadian national women's wheelchair basketball team.

=== Paralympic games ===
Team Canada is the only team to have won three consecutive gold medals at the Summer Paralympics, in 1992, 1996 and 2000.

- 1972 : 5th
- 1976 : 4th
- 1984 : 4th
- 1988 : 4th
- 1992 : Gold
- 1996 : Gold
- 2000 : Gold
- 2004 : Bronze
- 2008 : 5th
- 2012 : 6th
- 2016 : 5th
- 2020 : 5th
- 2024 : 4th

=== IWBF World Championships ===
The first Wheelchair Basketball World Championship for women was held in 1990, and since then Team Canada has won five times, including four consecutive wins in 1994, 1998, 2002 and 2006. In 2014 it won a fifth World Championship before a home crowd in Toronto.

- 1990 : Bronze
- 1994 : Gold
- 1998 : Gold
- 2002 : Gold
- 2006 : Gold
- 2010 : Bronze
- 2014 : Gold
- 2018 : 5th
- 2022 : 5th
- 2026 : Silver

=== Other International Tournaments ===
==== Parapan American Games ====
Team Canada has won one gold medal and five silver medals at the Parapan Am Games:

- 1986 : Silver
- 2007 : Silver
- 2011 : Silver
- 2015 : Silver
- 2019 : Gold
- 2023 : Silver

==== Women's U25 World Wheelchair Basketball Championships ====
The inaugural Women's U25 World Wheelchair Basketball Championships was held from 15 to 21 July 2011 at Brock University in St. Catharines, Ontario. The Canadian team was placed fourth, after the United States, Australia and Great Britain. The team included Cindy Ouellet, Maude Jacques, Jamey Jewells, Tamara Steeves and Abby Stubbert. At the 2015 Women's U25 Wheelchair Basketball World Championship in Beijing, Canada placed fourth after Great Britain, Australia and China. At the 2023 Women's U25 Wheelchair Basketball World Championship in Bangkok, Canada placed sixth.

== Teams ==
=== 2012 Summer Paralympic Games ===
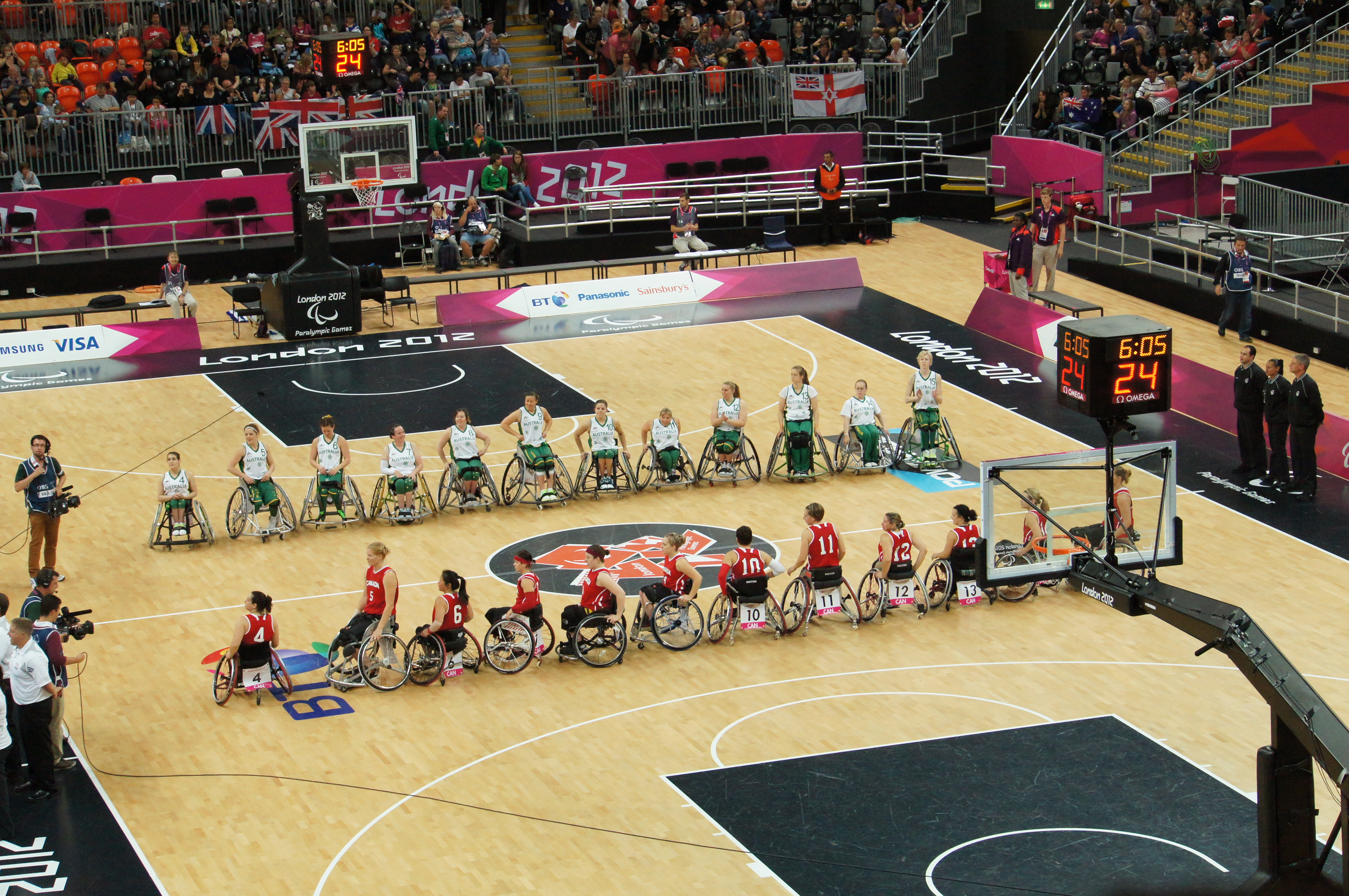
Australia - Canada match, women's wheelchair basketball at Paralympics 2012, September 1. Canada (in red), left to right: Elaine Allard, Janet Mclachlan, Kendra Ohama, Cindy Ouellet, Tamara Steeves, Maude Jacques, Katie Harnock, Tracey Ferguson, Jamey Jewells, Jessica Vliegenthart, Tara Feser

Team Canada at the 2012 Summer Paralympic Games in London consisted of:

The following is the Canada roster in the women's wheelchair basketball tournament of the 2012 Summer Paralympics.

Canada women's national wheelchair basketball team-2012 Summer Paralympics roster
Players
Coaches

No.	Name	Age – Date of birth	Pts.	Club	Ctr.
4	Elaine Allard	35 – 25 February 1977	1.5	Gladiateurs de Larval	(Canada)
5	Janet McLachlan	35 – 26 August 1977	4.5	BC Breakers	(Canada)
6	Kendra Ohama	47 – 1 June 1965	2.5	Trier Dolphins	(Germany)
7	Cindy Ouellet	23 – 8 December 1988	3.5	University of Alabama	(United States)
8	Tamara Steeves	22 – 23 September 1989	1.5	Brampton Cruisers	(Canada)
9	Maude Jacques	20 – 21 April 1992	2.5	University of Alabama	(United States)
10	Katie Harnock	29 – 12 August 1983	2.0	University of Alabama	(United States)
11	Elisha Williams	34 – 9 June 1978	4.5	BC Breakers	(Canada)
12	Tracey Ferguson	37 – 7 September 1974	3.0	Variety Village Club	(Canada)
13	Jamey Jewells	23 – 23 August 1989	1.0	Trier Dolphins	(Germany)
14	Jessica Vliegenthart	29 – 11 August 1983	1.0	BC Breakers	(Canada)
15	Tara Feser	32 – 2 February 1980	4.5	Edmonton Inferno	(Canada)

Head coach

- Bill Johnson

Assistant coach(es)

- Marni Abbott-Peter
- Michael Broughton
- Karla Tritten
- Tim Frick
- Danielle Peers

=== 2014 Women's World Wheelchair Basketball Championship ===
The gold medal-winning 2014 Women's World Wheelchair Basketball Championship team consisted of:

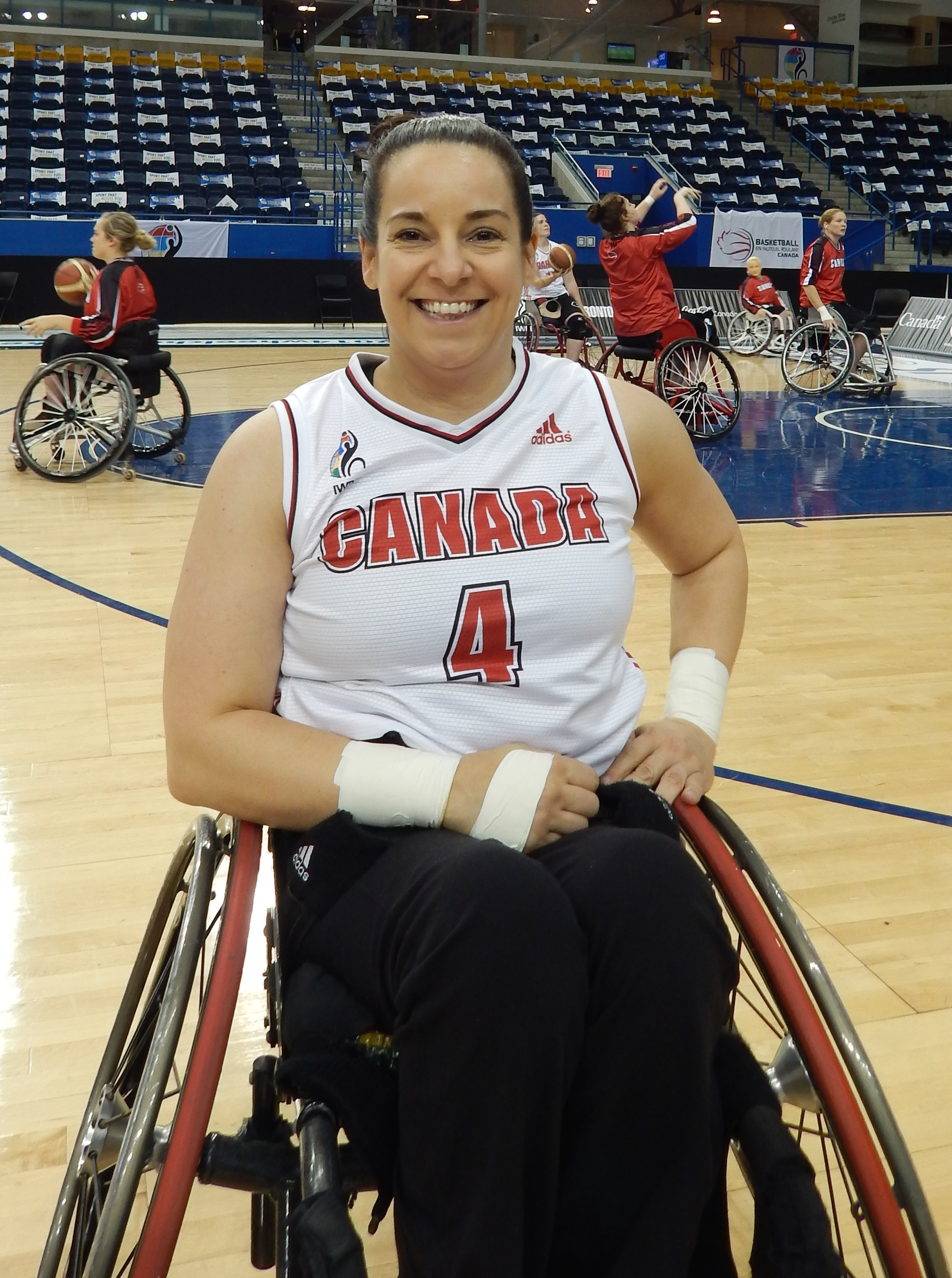
Elaine Allard

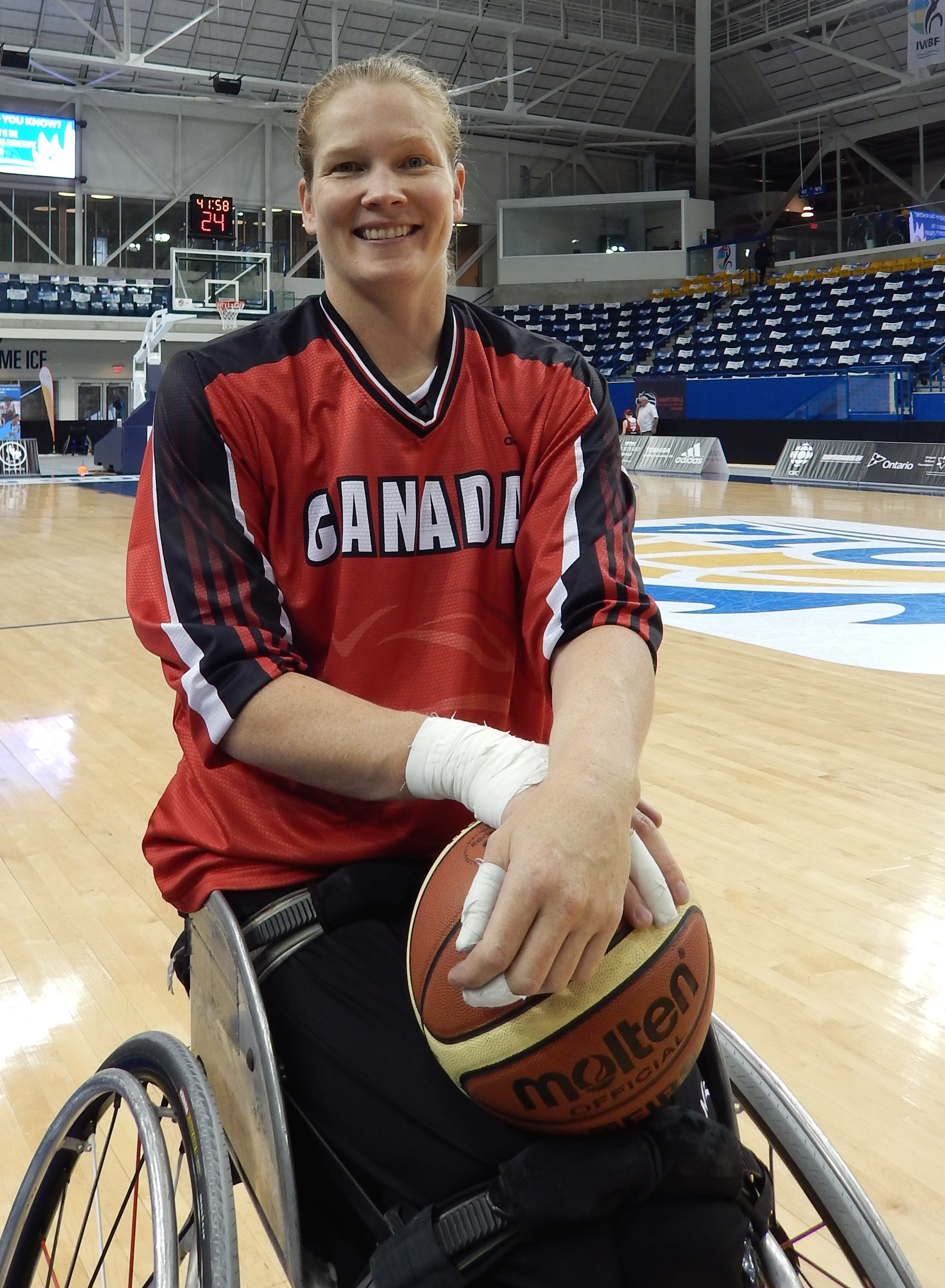
Janet McLachlan

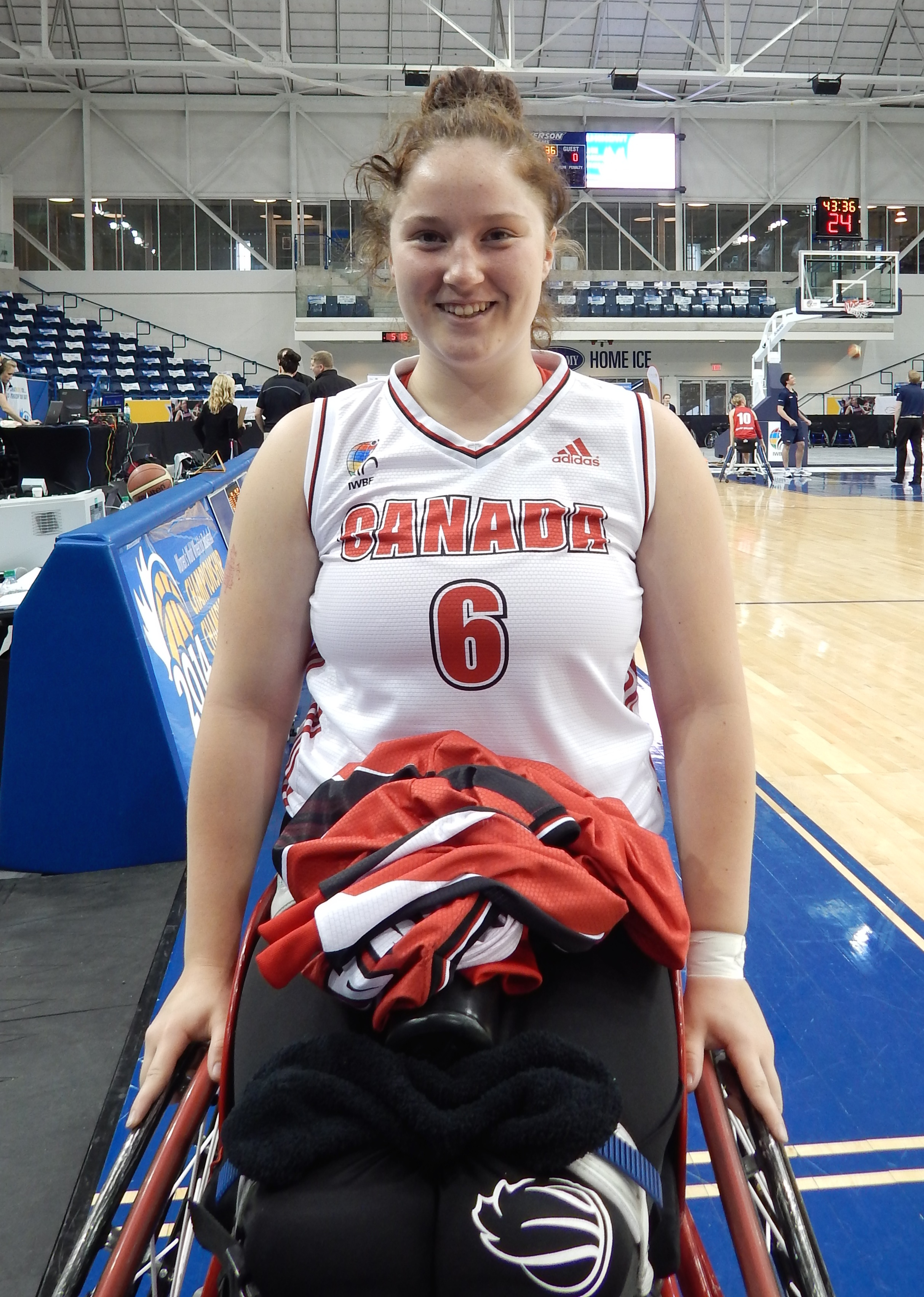
Arinn Young

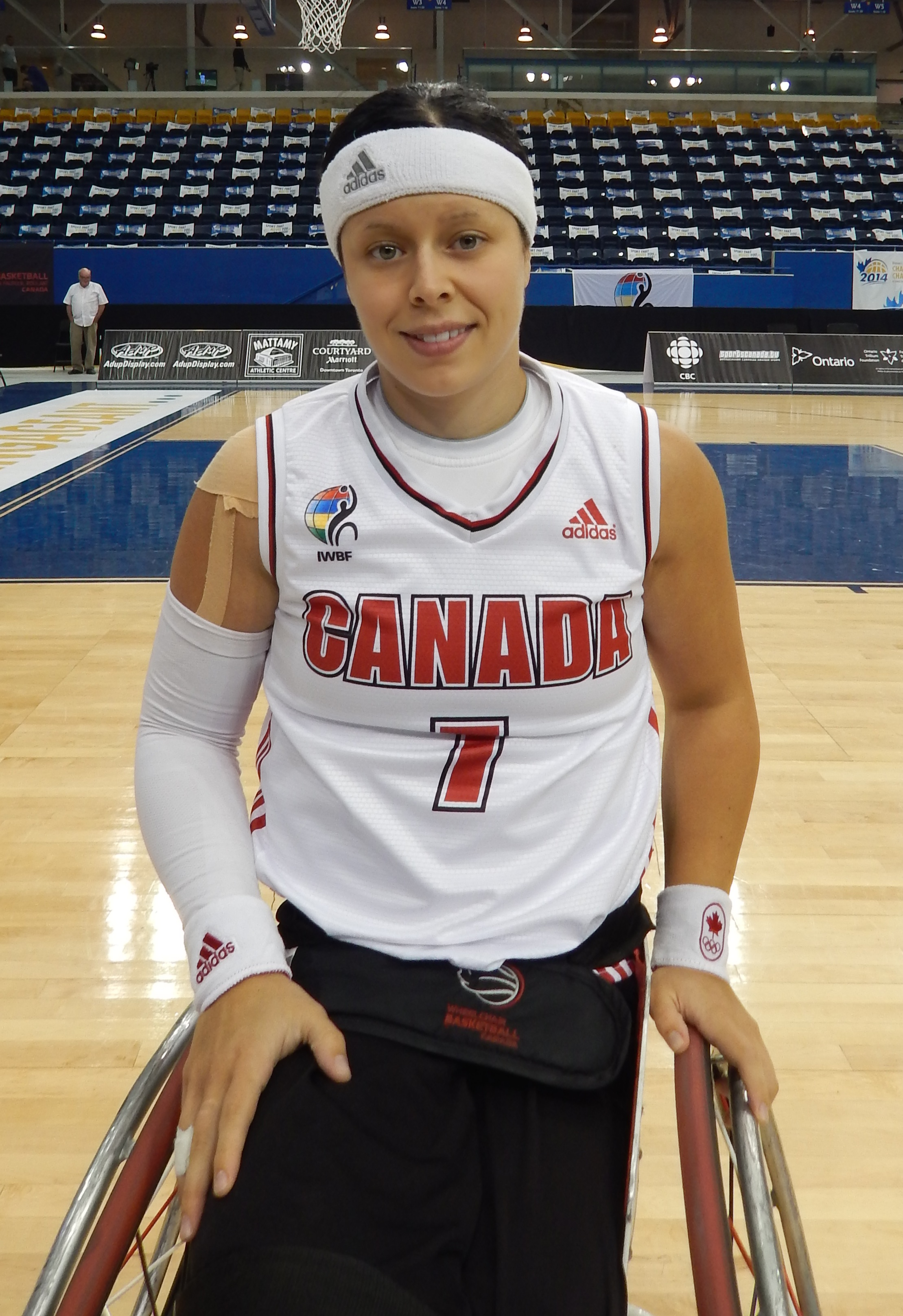
Cindy Ouellet

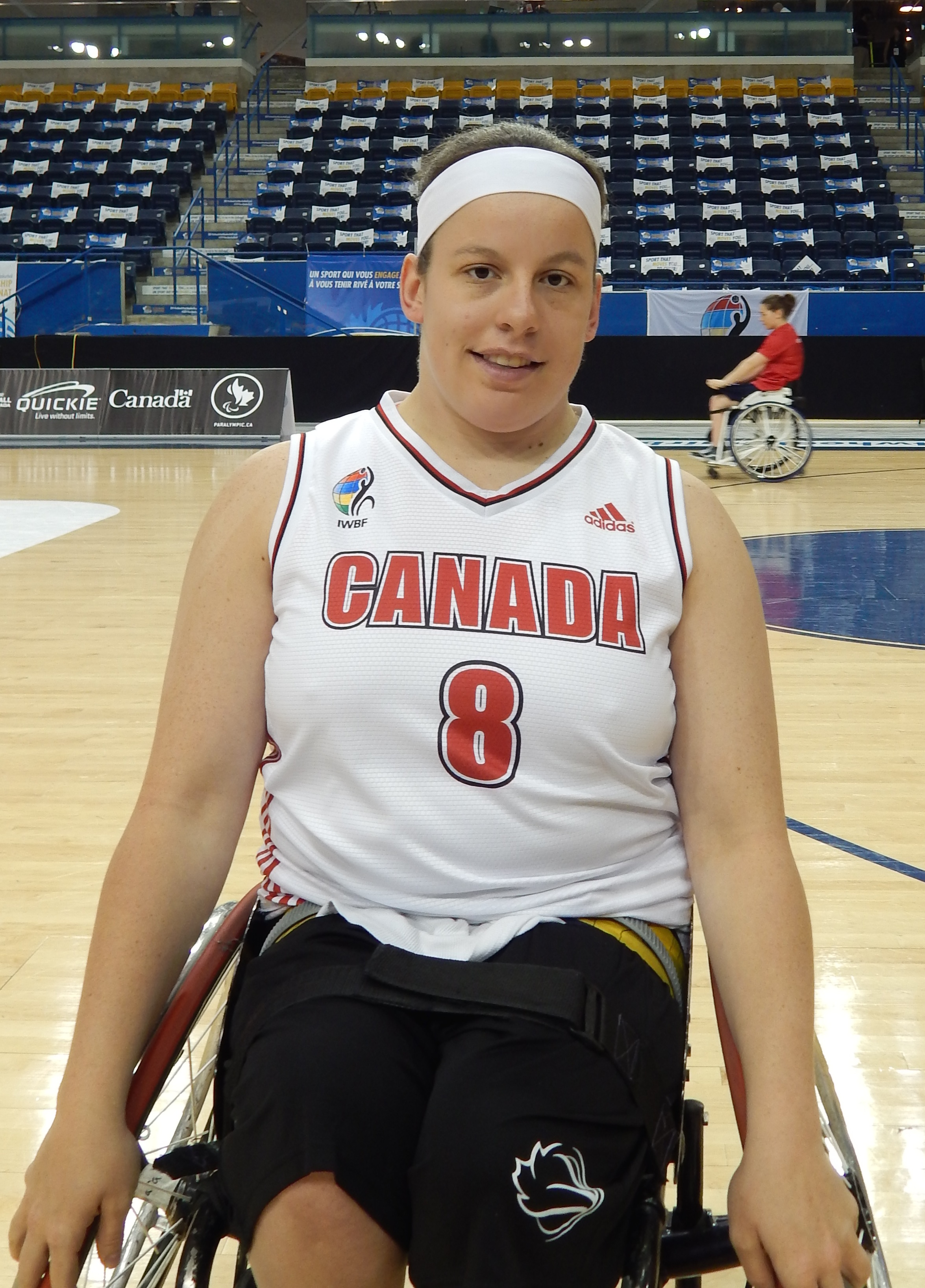
Tamara Steeves

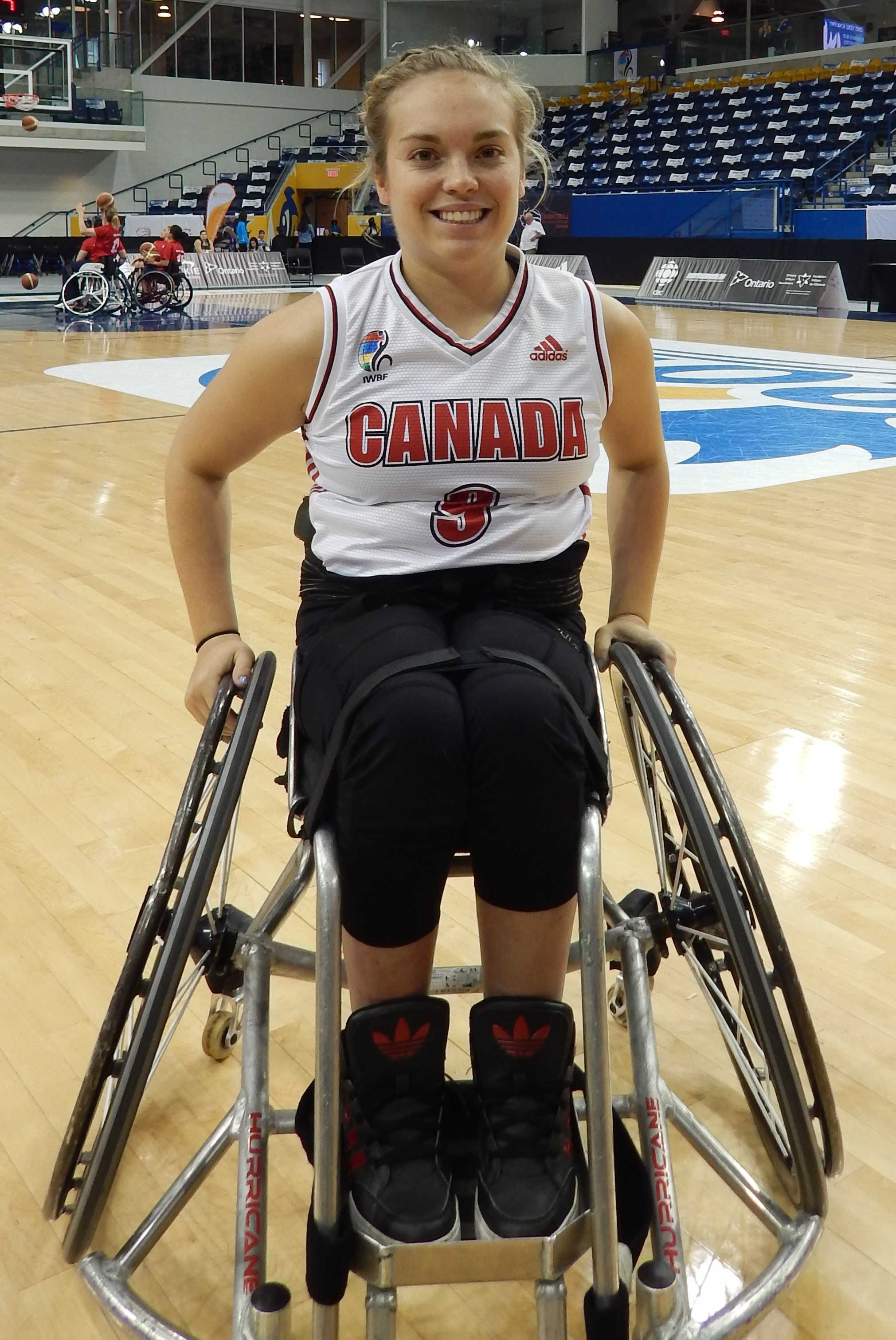
Maude Jacques

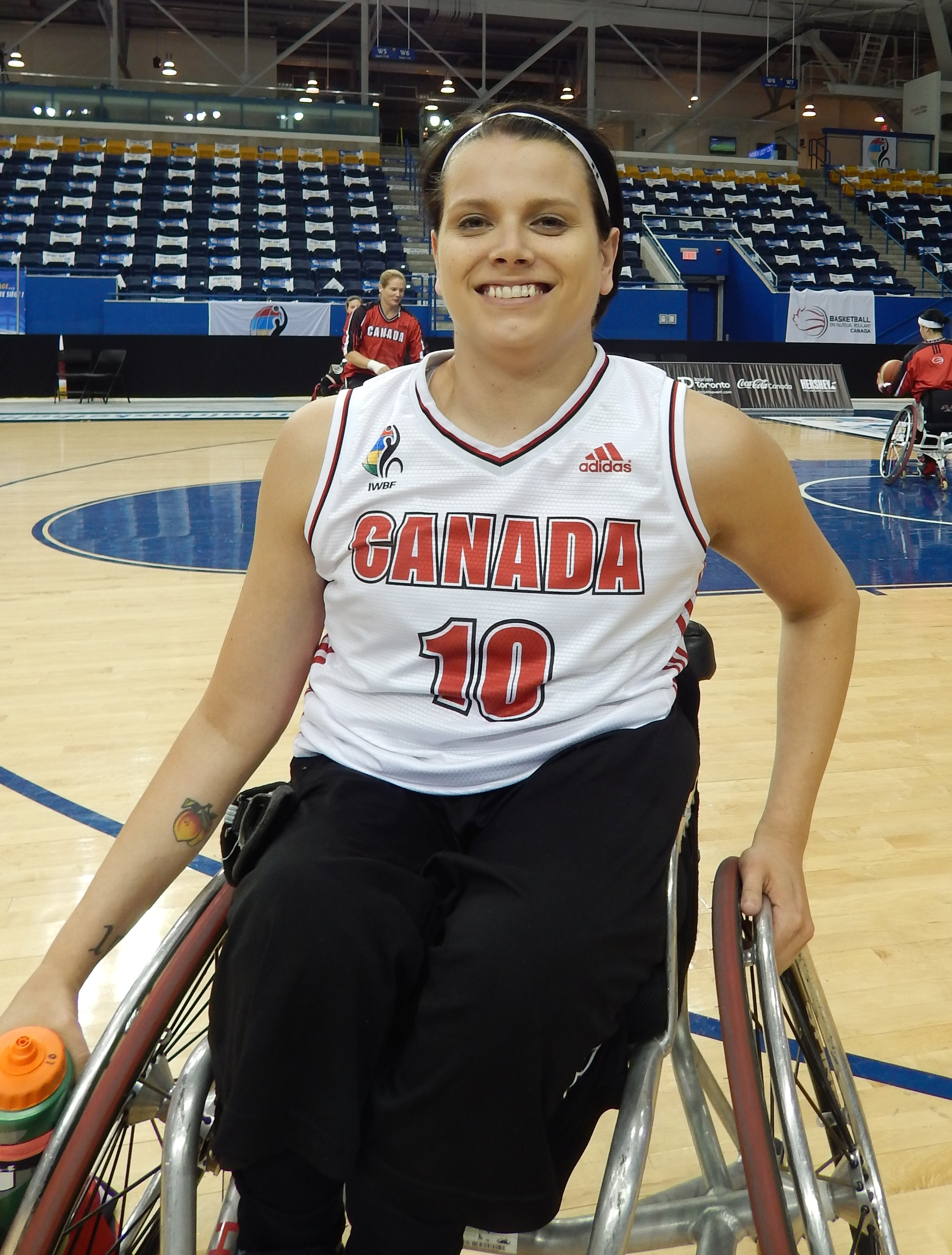
Katie Harnock

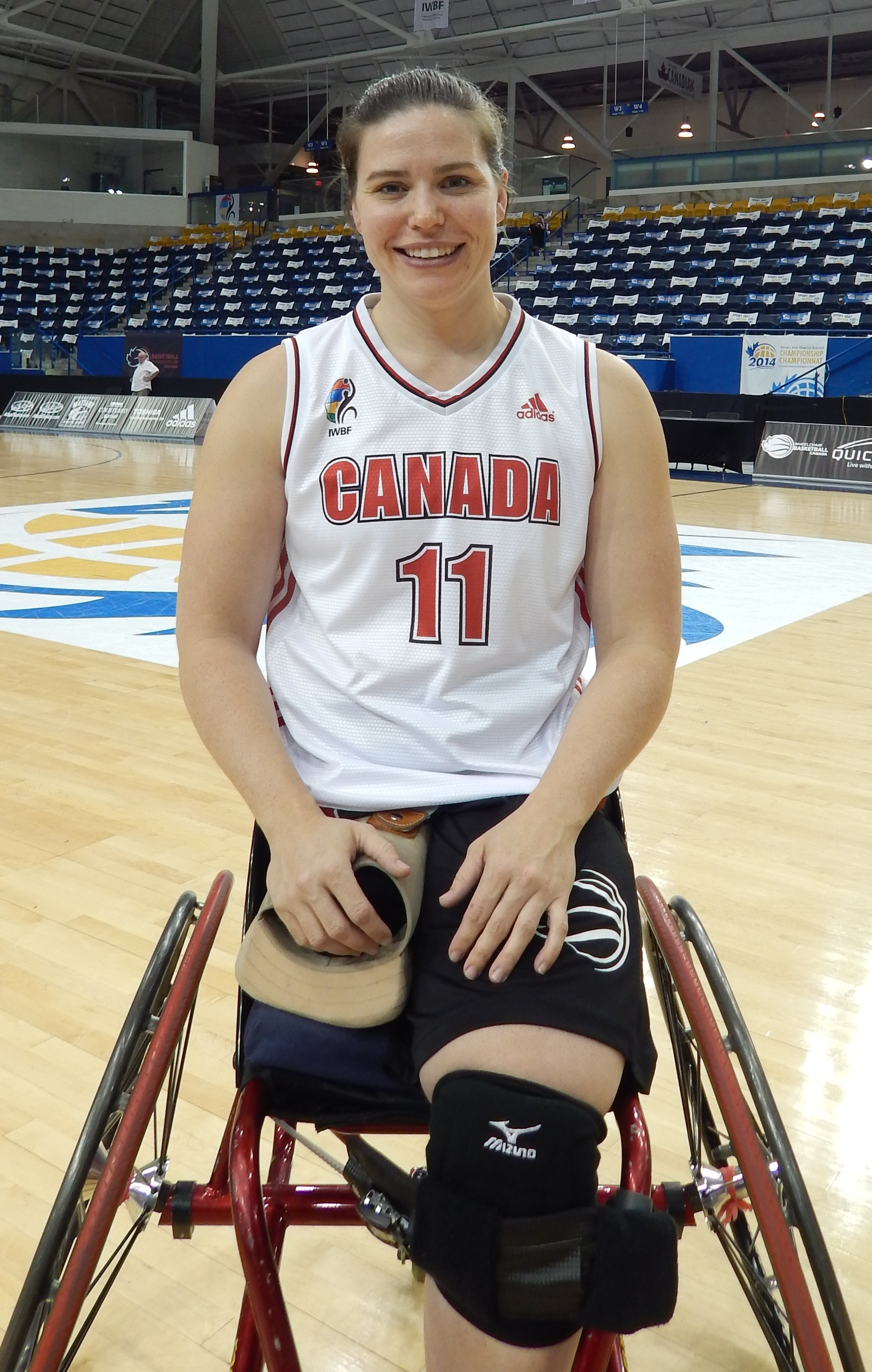
Darda Sales

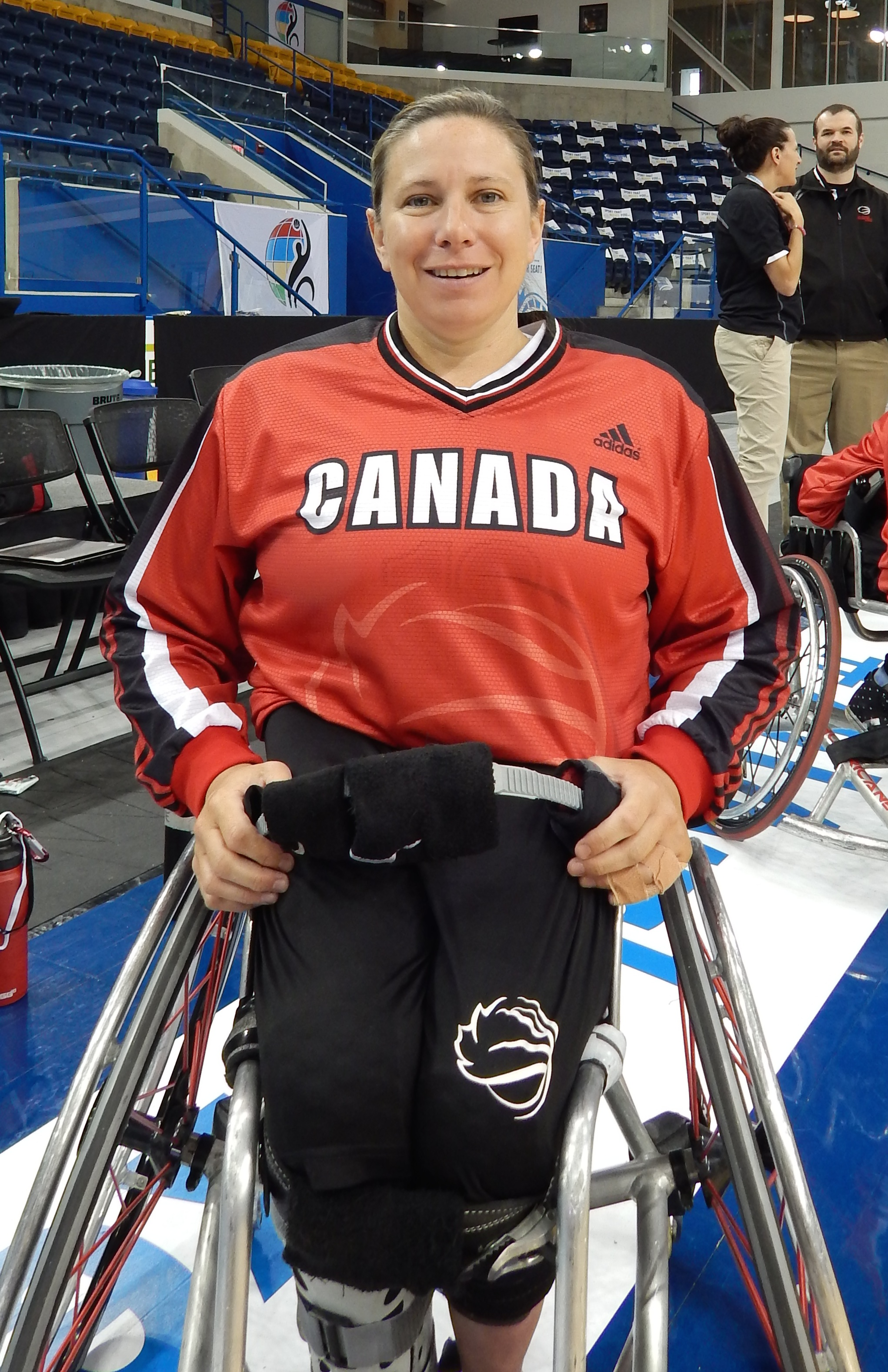
Tracey Ferguson

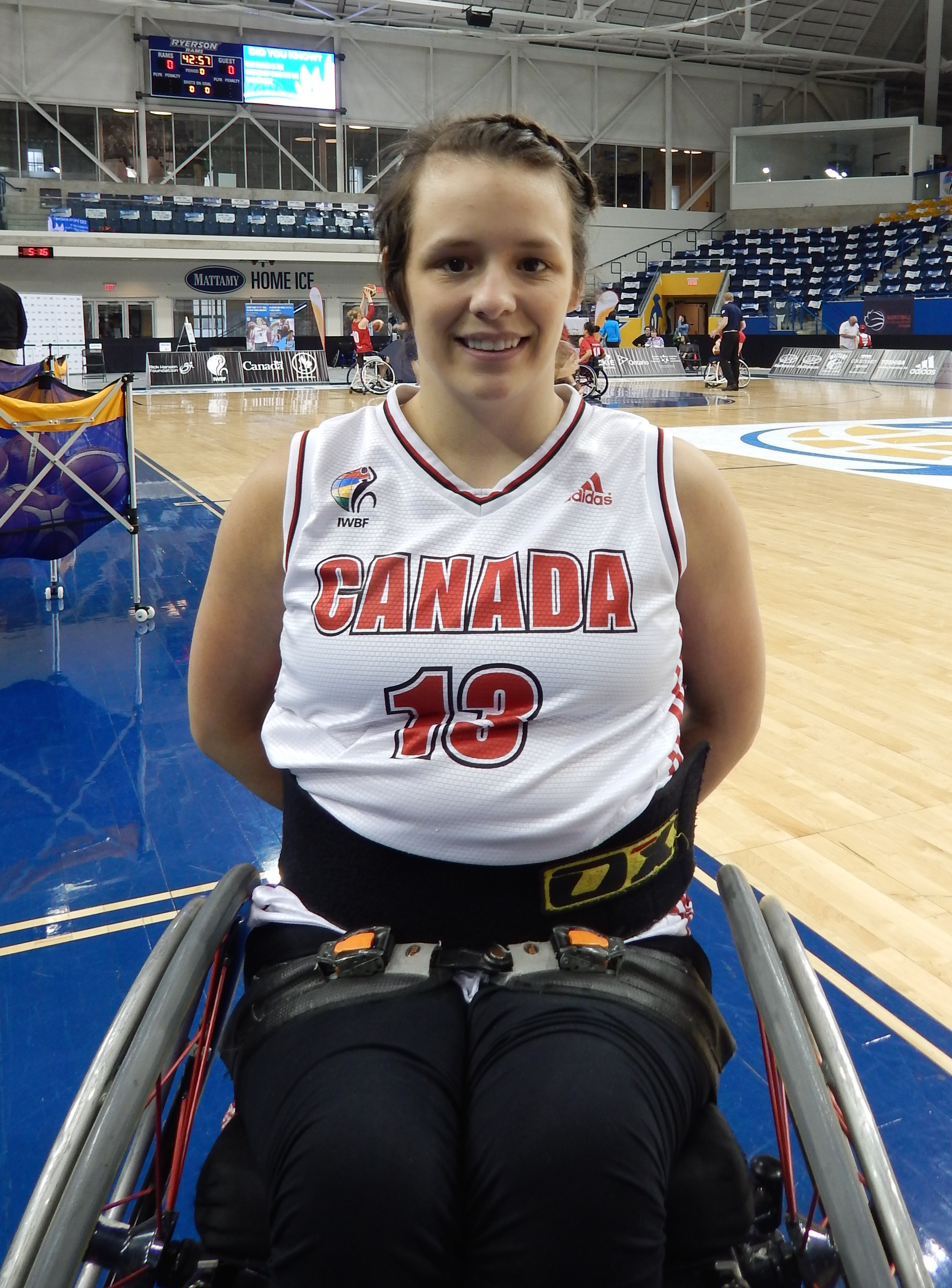
Jamie Jewells

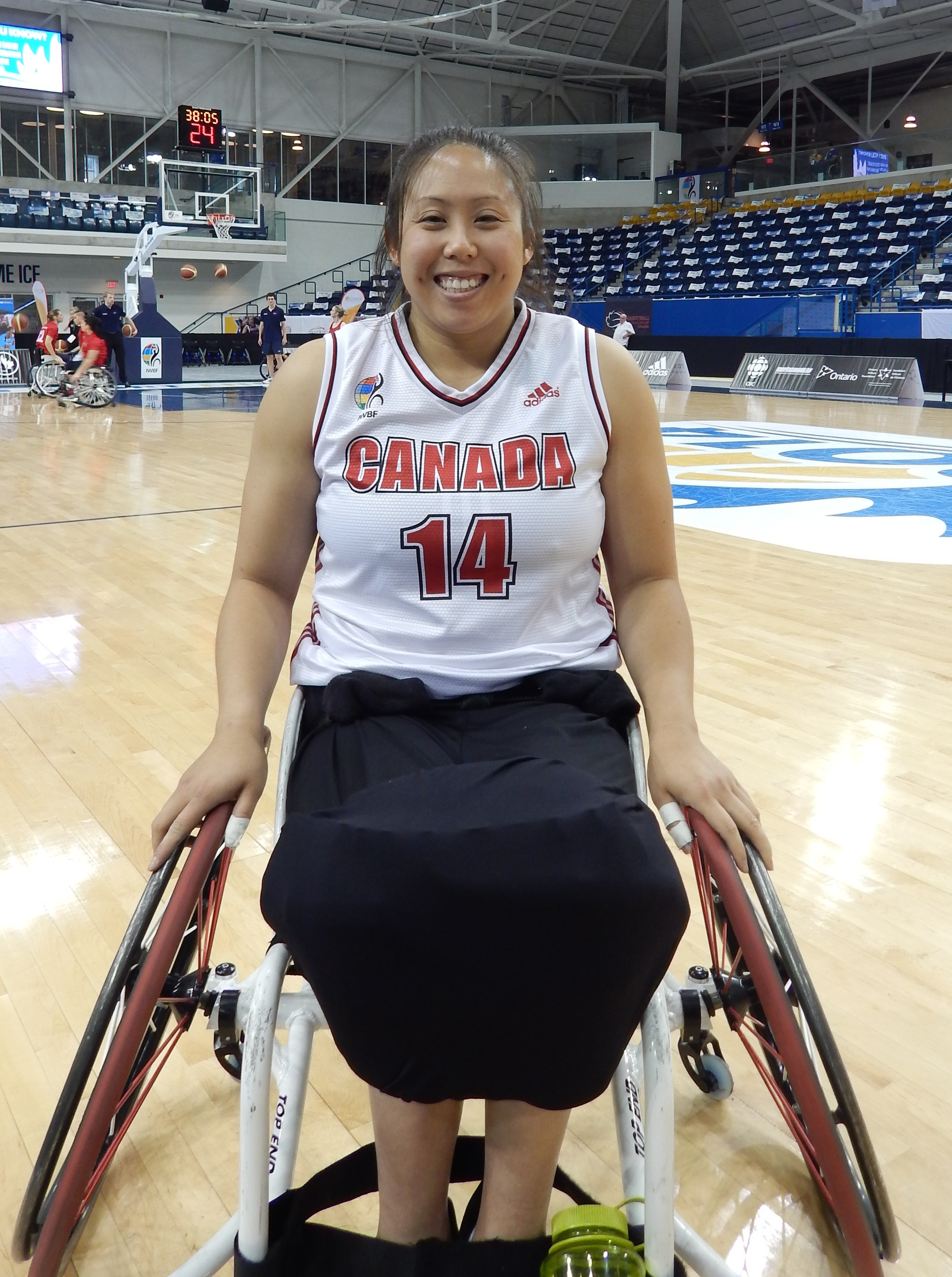
Amanda Yan

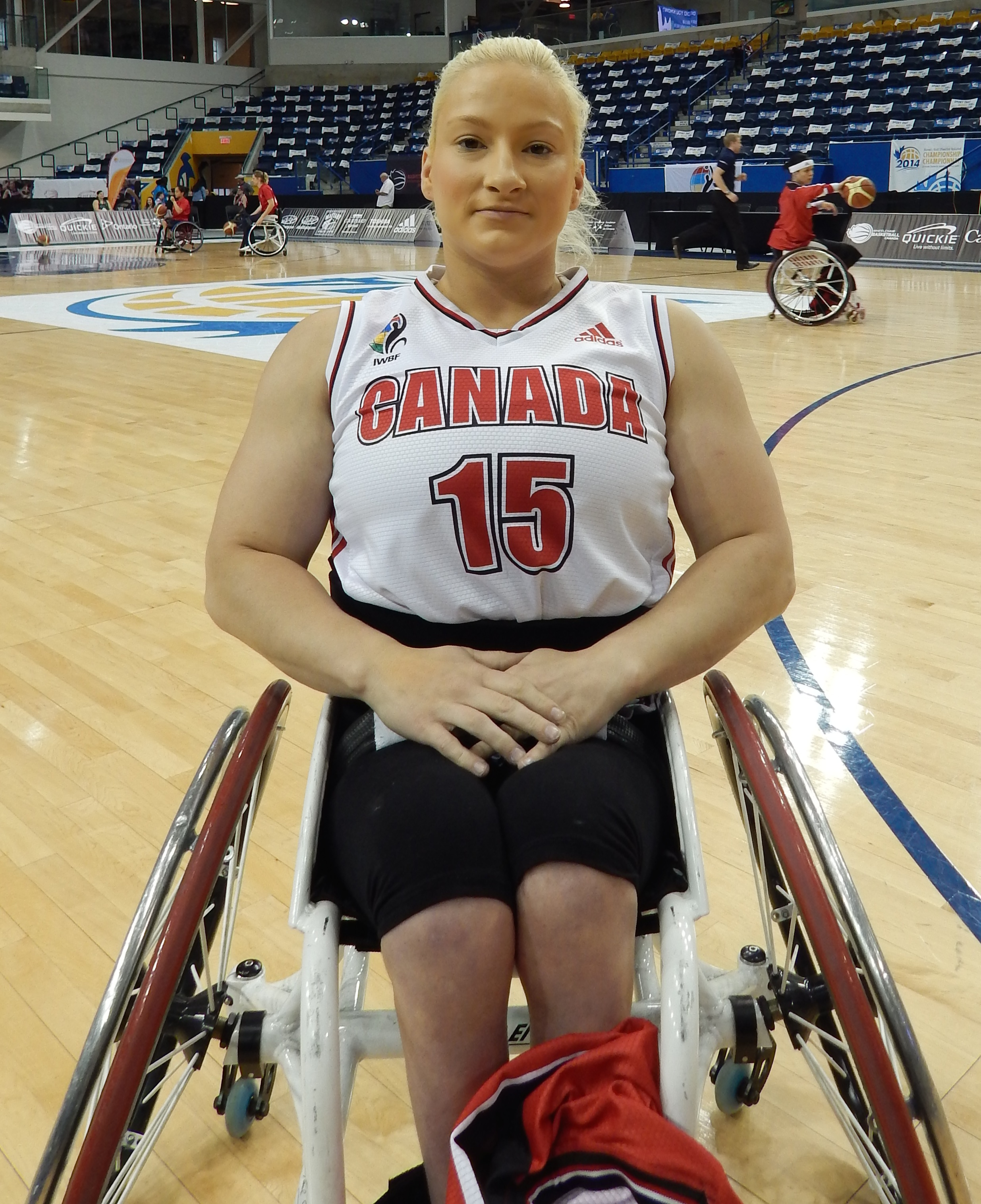
Melanie Hawtin

Number	Name	Date of birth	Classification	Club
4	Elaine Allard	25 February 1977	1.5	(Canada) Saint-Eustache
5	Janet McLachlan	26 August 1977	4.5	(Canada) Vancouver
6	Arinn Young	10 July 1996	4.5	(Canada) Legal
7	Cindy Ouellet	8 December 1988	3.5	(Canada) Québec
8	Tamara Steeves	23 September 1989	1.5	(Canada) Mississauga
9	Maude Jacques	21 April 1992	2.5	(Canada) Sainte-Catherine
10	Katie Harnock	12 August 1983	2.0	(Canada) Elmira
11	Darda Sales	11 September 1982	4.5	(Canada) London (Ontario)
12	Tracey Ferguson	7 September 1974	3.0	(Canada) Holland Landing
13	Jamey Jewells	23 August 1989	1.0	(Canada) Donkin
14	Amanda Yan	22 May 1988	3.0	(Canada) Burnaby
15	Melanie Hawtin	20 July 1988	1.5	(Canada) Oakville
Alt.	Corin Metzger	28 February 1992	2.5	(Canada) Elmira

- Coach : Bill Johnson
- Assistant coaches : Michael Broughton, Michele Hynes
- Physiotherapist : Sheila Forler Bauman
- Team Doctor : Richard Goudie
- Massage Therapist : Sophie Lavardière
- Team Manager : Katie Miyazaki
- Sports psychologist : Adrienne Leslie-Toogood
- Physiologist : Mike Dahl
- Strength coach : Kyle Turcotte

== See also ==
- Canada women's national basketball team
