= Brett Stibners =

Australian wheelchair basketball player

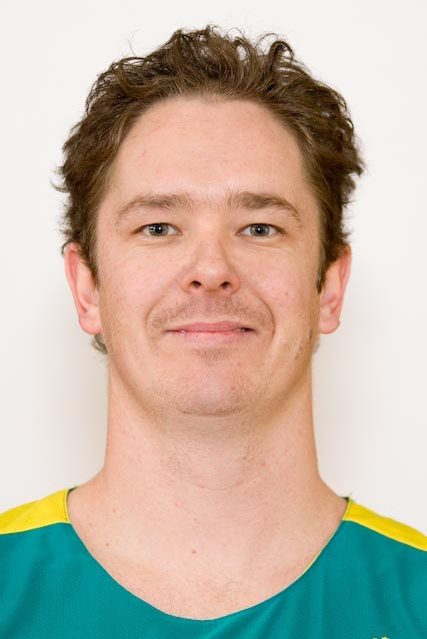
- Portrait of Australian Paralympic wheelchair basketballer Stibners in 2012

Personal information
- Full name: Brett Andrew Stibners
- Nationality: Australia
- Born: 25 June 1979 (age 47)

Sport
- Club: Wollongong Roller Hawks
Medal record
Wheelchair basketball
Paralympic Games
Gold medal – first place	2008 Beijing	Men's wheelchair basketball
Silver medal – second place	2012 London	Men's wheelchair basketball
World Championship
Bronze medal – third place	2006 Amsterdam	Team
Gold medal – first place	2010 Birmingham	Team
Bronze medal – third place	2018 Hamburg	Team

Brett Andrew Stibners, OAM (born 25 June 1979) is an Australian wheelchair basketball player who won a gold medal at the 2008 Summer Paralympics and the 2010 Wheelchair Basketball World Championship. He was a member of the Rollers team that competed at the 2020 Summer Paralympics, his fourth Games.

== Personal ==
Stibners was born on 25 June 1979, and is from the Wollongong suburb of Oak Flats. He is a full-time athlete, and is nicknamed Sticky. His left leg was amputated above the knee after a car accident in 2001, in which the car he was driving collided with a truck. Prior to his accident, he worked as an apprentice electrician.

== Basketball ==
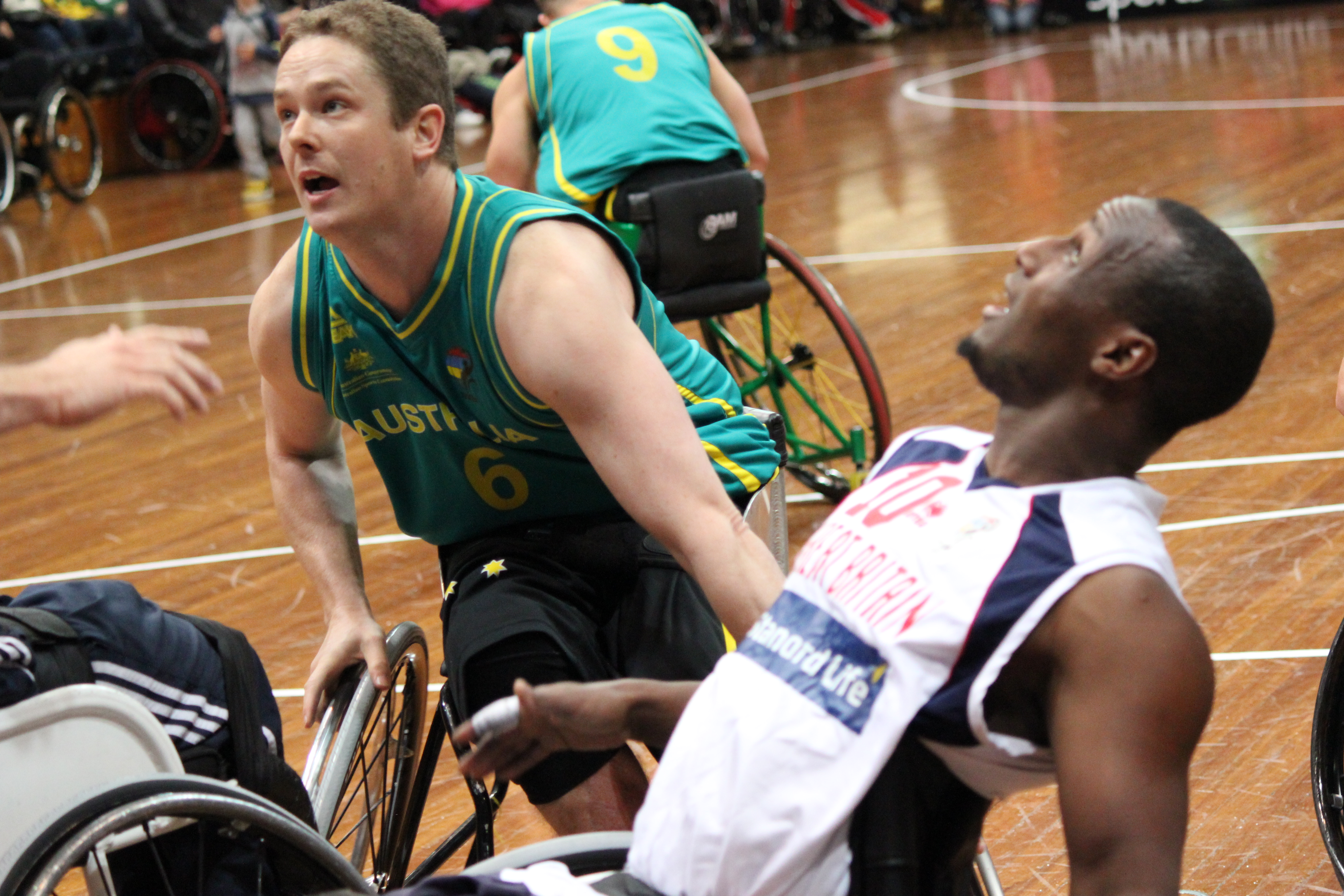
Great Britain vs Australia men's national wheelchair basketball team at Gliders & Rollers World Challenge on 21 July 2012. Aussie 6 Brett Stibners and 9 Tristan Knowles. GB no 10 is Abdi Jama

Stibners is classified as a 4.0 player and is a forward. He first started playing wheelchair basketball in 2003. In 2010, he was the recipient of a A$10,000 grant by WorkCover NSW to enable him to worry less about money and prepare for the 2012 Summer Paralympics. He used the money to cover training and travel expenses, and to maintain his wheelchair. He was at a press appearance announcing funding for Paralympic sport in March 2011. At the event, he played wheelchair basketball with then New South Wales Premiere Kristina Keneally.

=== National team ===
Stibners first represented Australia on the national level in 2006.

==== Paralympics ====
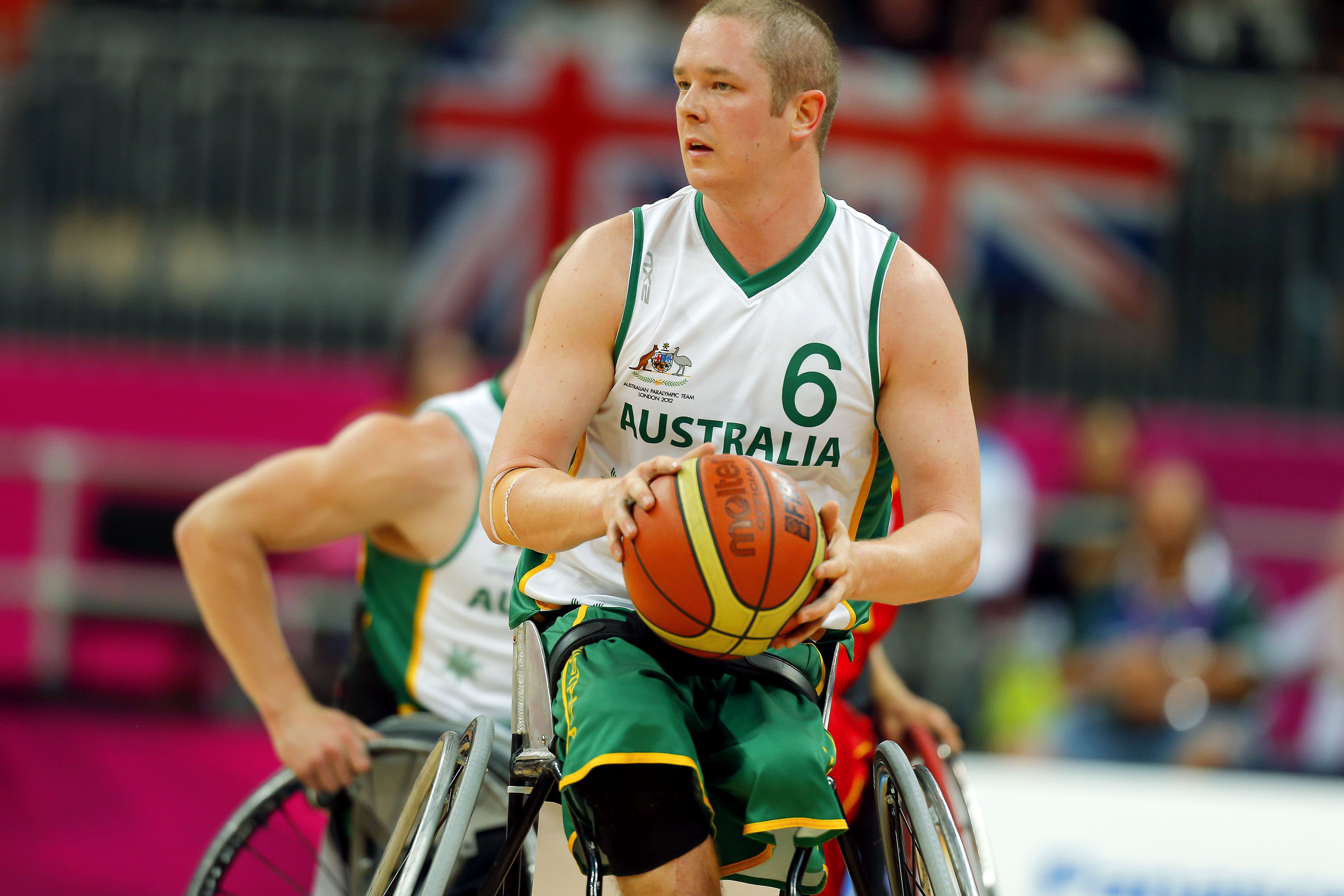
Stibners at the 2012 London Paralympics

Stibners was part of the gold medal-winning Australia men's national wheelchair basketball team at the 2008 Summer Paralympics, for which he received a Medal of the Order of Australia. At the 2012 Summer Paralympics he was part of the Australian men's wheelchair team that won silver. In 2016, he was selected for the 2016 Summer Paralympics in Rio de Janeiro where his team, The Rollers, finished sixth.

At the 2020 Tokyo Paralympics, the Rollers finished fifth with a win–loss record of 4–4.

==== Other competitions ====
In 2003, Stibners was a member of the national squad that competed at the Gold Cup in Amsterdam. This was his first international appearance. In 2007, he was part of the gold medal-winning team at the Arafura Games. In 2009, he was part of the national squad that won gold at the Rollers World Challenge and the team that won gold at the Paralympic World Cup held in Manchester, England. He was a member of the Australia men's national wheelchair basketball team that competed at the 2010 Wheelchair Basketball World Championship that won a gold medal. In 2018, he was a member of the Rollers that won the bronze medal at 2018 Wheelchair Basketball World Championship in Hamburg, Germany.

=== Club basketball ===
Stibners started playing club basketball in 2002 for the Wollongong Roller Hawks of Australia's National Wheelchair Basketball League. He is classified as a 4.0 player and plays as a forward. In 2003, he won a league championship with the team. In 2007, he played club basketball in Spain for CD Fundosa Group. In 2010, he was playing club basketball with Wollongong Rollerhawks. As of 2011, he plays his club basketball for the NWBL's Wollongong Roller Hawks. His team beat the Perth Wheelcats in the 2011 NWBL Championship. In the semi-final round, he scored 26 points and had 18 rebounds. In the finals, he had 23 points, 10 rebounds and 8 assists.

== Coaching ==
Stibners is an Assistant Coach with the Rollers at the 2024 Paris Paralympics.

== Hockey ==
Stibners named as a member of the Australian national indoor hockey team prior to his 2001 accident.

== Recognition ==
Shellharbour City gave him a key to the city in 2008.
