= Jeremy Doyle =

Australian wheelchair basketball player

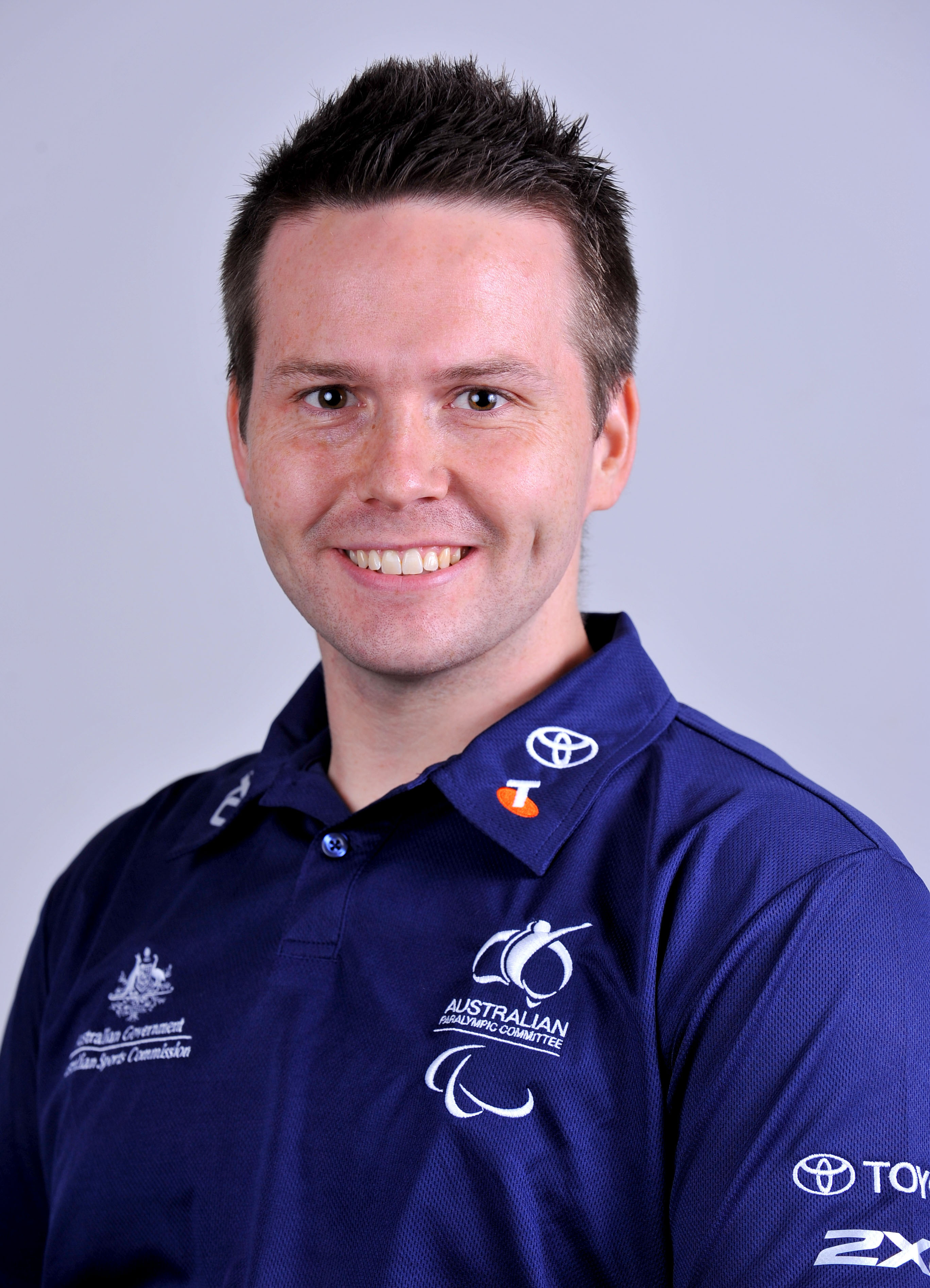
- 2012 Australian Paralympic team portrait of Doyle

Personal information
- Full name: Jeremy George Doyle
- Nickname: JD
- Nationality: Australia
- Born: 2 November 1983 Wagga Wagga
- Died: 18 December 2011 (aged 28) Sydney, Australia

Sport
- Club: Wenty Wheelkings
Medal record
Men's wheelchair basketball
Representing Australia
Paralympic World Cup
Gold medal – first place	2009 Manchester	Team
World Championship
Gold medal – first place	2010 Birmingham	Team

Jeremy "JD" Doyle (2 November 1983 – 18 December 2011) was an Australian wheelchair basketball player. He became paraplegic due to being run over by a truck and competed in the 2009 Paralympic World Cup and the 2010 World Championship. He died of cancer in 2011 at the age of 28.

== Early and personal life ==
Doyle was born on 19 November 1983. He became a paraplegic at the age of four after being struck by a car. He worked for ING in 2009. In 2009, Doyle was named a Don't DIS my ABILITY Ambassador.

At the 2010 New South Wales Institute of Sport Awards, he was honoured for his "Outstanding Achievement". In 2010, he was diagnosed with bladder cancer. In August 2011, while he was preparing for the 2012 London Paralympics, the cancer returned and he was diagnosed as terminally ill. On 2 December 2011, Doyle married Melanie Carr, whom he had met online in April 2011, at Campbelltown Hospital. He died from cancer on 18 December 2011 in Sydney, aged 28.

== Career ==
Jeremy was an outstanding athlete and an inspirational individual who lived life to the fullest. He will be dearly missed by not only the Australian Paralympics family but by all who knew him. He wanted to get to the London Paralympics and I have no doubt he would have made it.

— Australian Paralympic Committee CEO Jason Hellwig

Doyle was a basketball point guard and guard. He was classified as a 1 point player. He had a wheelchair basketball scholarship from the New South Wales Institute of Sport. His basketball teammates nicknamed him JD. His jersey number was 14.

He was a member of the Australia men's national wheelchair basketball team, and made his team debut in 2009 at the Paralympic World Cup. He also competed at the 2010 Wheelchair Basketball World Championship. The team won a gold medal in both.

He competed at the 2009 IWBF Asia-Oceania Championship, where his team finished first. He was chosen to represent Australia at the 2012 Summer Paralympics. His last appearance for the national team was at the 2011 Tri-Nations Series in Canberra, Australia, where he scored 8 points and had one assist in the 30 June match against the Netherlands. At the time, he was coached by Ben Ettridge.

Doyle first played in the National Wheelchair Basketball League in 2007. He played for the Wenty Wheelkings, making his debut as a starter for the team in 2008. In 2009, he was playing for the Sydney Wheelkings.

Doyle also played wheelchair hockey; he was a member of Australia's national team. He played his club electric wheelchair hockey for the New South Wales team, the Hawks. As of December 2011, he is the league's leading scorer for the 2011/2012 season.

Doyle participated at the World Cyber Games in Counter-Strike, where he represented Australia in 2001 and again in 2006.
