= John McPhail (basketball) =

Australian wheelchair basketball player

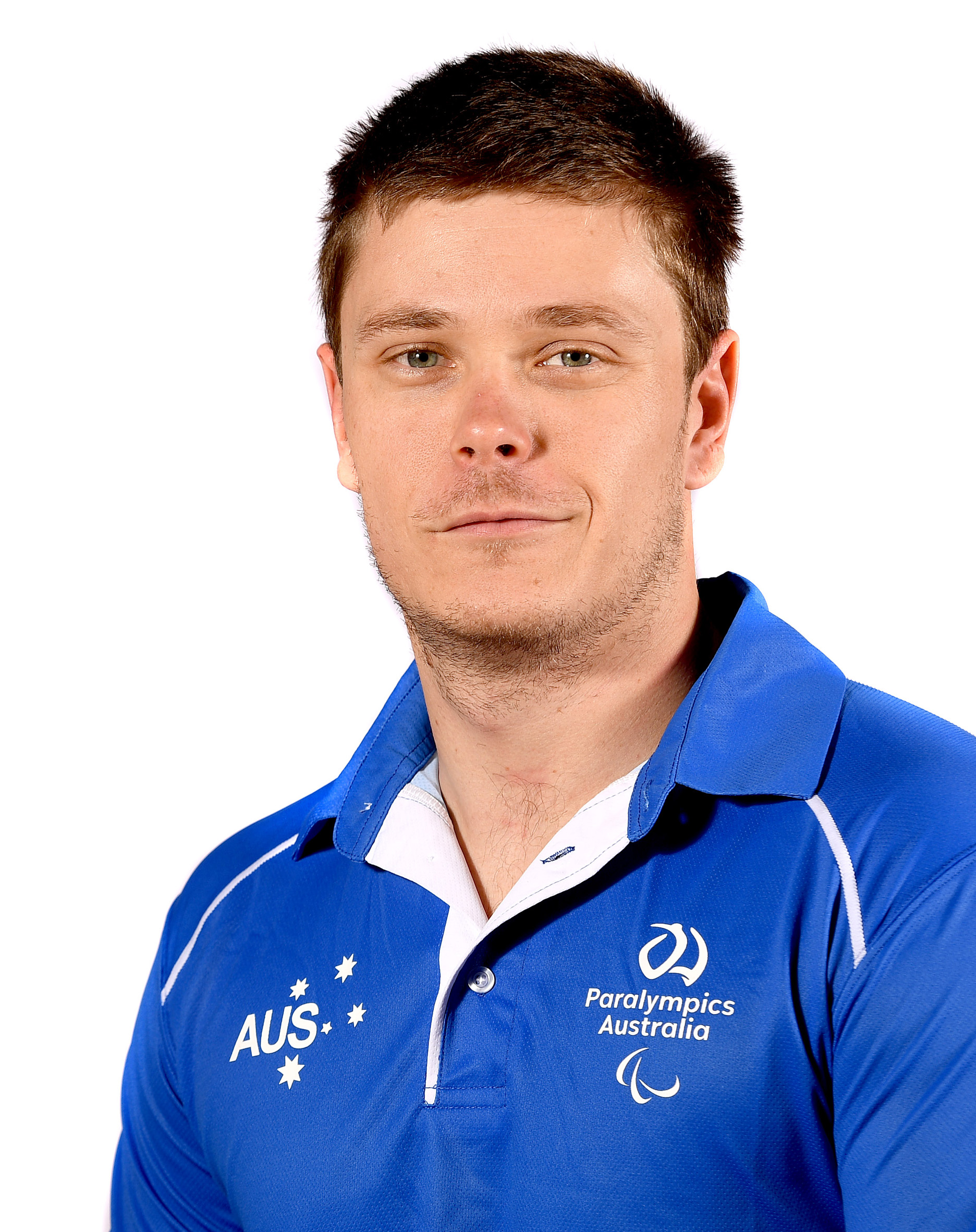
- John McPhail in 2019

Personal information
- Nationality: Australia
- Born: 30 December 1989 (age 36)

Sport
- Club: Sydney Metro Blue Hornets
Medal record
Wheelchair basketball
World Championship
Gold medal – first place	2010 Birmingham	Team

John McPhail (born 30 December 1989) is a wheelchair basketball player from Australia. He was a member of the Australia men's national wheelchair basketball team that competed at the 2010 Wheelchair Basketball World Championship, winning the gold medal. He was a member of the Rollers team that competed at the 2020 Summer Paralympics.

== Personal ==
He comes from Peakhurst, New South Wales, Australia. He went to the United States to complete social work studies at University of Texas at Arlington. He and his wife Jillian married in 2019 and reside in the Dallas/Fort Worth Metroplex. In 2021, he is a Sales and Marketing Representative in Dallas, Texas.

== Basketball ==
He is a 3.0 point player. McPhail's wheelchair basketball career started in 2004 with the New South Wales junior team. He was a member of the Australia men's national wheelchair basketball team which won the gold medal at the 2010 Wheelchair Basketball World Championship.

Whilst studying the United States, he played for the University of Texas at Arlington's Movin’ Mavs wheelchair basketball team. In 2015, he played with the NWBL Dallas Wheelchair Mavericks and won the national title. He has played professionally in Germany with Köln 99ers (2015–16) and Rhine River Rhinos (2016–17).

In 2020, he was playing with the Sydney Metro Blue Hornets. After years of hard work, he was selected to the Australian Rollers Squad that will play at the Tokyo 2020 Paralympics.

At the 2020 Tokyo Paralympics, the Rollers finished fifth with a win/loss record of 4-4.
