= Matt Sealy =

British wheelchair basketball player (born 1982)

Personal information
- Nationality: United Kingdom
- Born: 21 June 1982 (age 44) Toronto, Canada

Sport
- Country: Great Britain
- Sport: Wheelchair basketball
- Event: Men's team
- Club: Capital City Aces
- Team: Bulldogs

Matt Sealy (born 21 June 1982) is a British wheelchair basketball player. He was selected to play for Team GB in the 2012 Summer Paralympics in London.

== Personal life ==
Sealy was born on 21 June 1982 in Toronto, Canada. He currently lives in Maidenhead, Berkshire. He became a paraplegic in 1985 after a car accident.

== Wheelchair basketball ==
He was introduced to wheelchair basketball by his mother, when she took him to a National Junior Games taster session in Stoke Mandeville, Buckinghamshire in 1993. Since then, he has played wheelchair basketball for over seventeen years. He is classed as a 2.0 wheelchair basketball player. He once played for an Italian wheelchair basketball squad. He spent twelve years with Super League Club Aces. He helped this team win gold in the Super Wheelchair Basketball League Cup. He has represented Great Britain under 22s (Team GB under 22s) in two European Championships. He made his official Great Britain debut at the BT Paralympic World Cup in 2006. Since then, he has played in European Championship and World Championship matches for Great Britain.

Despite his long career, Sealy has only competed in three championships as a senior. The first was the 2009 European Championships, held in Adana, an agricultural city in southern Turkey. In this event, he won a bronze medal; coming third place, along with the British team. In 2010, he played in the 2010 World Wheelchair Basketball Championships, held on home soil in Birmingham, England. However, the team finished in fifth place in this event. In 2011, he was in the 2011 European Championships, held in Nazareth, northern Israel. This match saw a victory for Sealy and his team.
