= Darlene Hunter =

American wheelchair basketball player

Personal information
- National team: United States women's national wheelchair basketball team
- Born: April 16, 1982 (age 44) Walled Lake, Michigan, U.S.

Sport
- Country: United States
- Sport: Women's Wheelchair Basketball

Darlene Hunter (born 16 April 1982 in Walled Lake, Michigan) is an American wheelchair basketball player. She is a member of the United States women's national wheelchair basketball team.

== Life ==
Hunter was born near Detroit in Michigan in 1982 to Donald Hunter and Julie Sisko who also have a son. Her spine was damaged in an accident with a road grader when she was four. She was keen on athletics and when she went to college she was recruited into Wheelchair basketball.

=== Education ===
She studied at Walled Lake Western High School, University of Arizona, University of Texas at Arlington, and Texas Women's University.

=== Wheelchair basketball ===
Hunter played Wheelchair basketball at the 2012 Summer Paralympics in London where the US team came fourth. She and her team won the gold medal at the 2016 Summer Paralympics in Rio de Janeiro.

She became world champion at the 2010 Wheelchair Basketball World Championship and she won the gold medal at the 2011 Parapan American Games. Hunter competed at the 2014 Women's World Wheelchair Basketball Championship, and won the gold medal at the 2015 Parapan American Games.

She founded an annual women's wheelchair basketball camp. In 2017 she was recognised as an "Everyday Hero" at the "espnW: Women + Sports Summit". She received a $10,000 grant which she used to extend her free outreach work of her basketball camp. The camp is based at the University of Texas at Arlington.

In 2019 she went to Peru to join the national team to compete at her second ParaPan American Games which that year was in Lima.
