= Michael Hartnett (basketball) =

Australian wheelchair basketball player (born 1982)

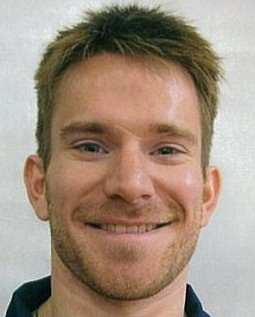
- 2012 Australian Paralympic team portrait of Hartnett

Personal information
- Full name: Michael Mathew Hartnett
- Nationality: Australian
- Born: 3 June 1982 (age 44)
Medal record
Wheelchair basketball
Paralympic Games
Gold medal – first place	2008 Beijing	Men's wheelchair basketball
Silver medal – second place	2012 London	Men's wheelchair basketball
World Championship
Gold medal – first place	2010 Birmingham	Team
Gold medal – first place	2014 Incheon	Team

Michael Mathew Hartnett, OAM (born 3 June 1982) is an Australian wheelchair basketball player who won a gold medal at the 2008 Summer Paralympics and the 2010 and 2014 Wheelchair Basketball World Championship.

== Personal ==
Hartnett was born on 3 June 1982, and is from the Perth suburb of Gosnells. He became a paraplegic after a car accident. He is a student, and his role model is Brad Ness. One of his hobbies is collecting flight tags connected to flights he made while competing in wheelchair basketball. He also loves to learn new languages, like French and Italian.

== Basketball ==
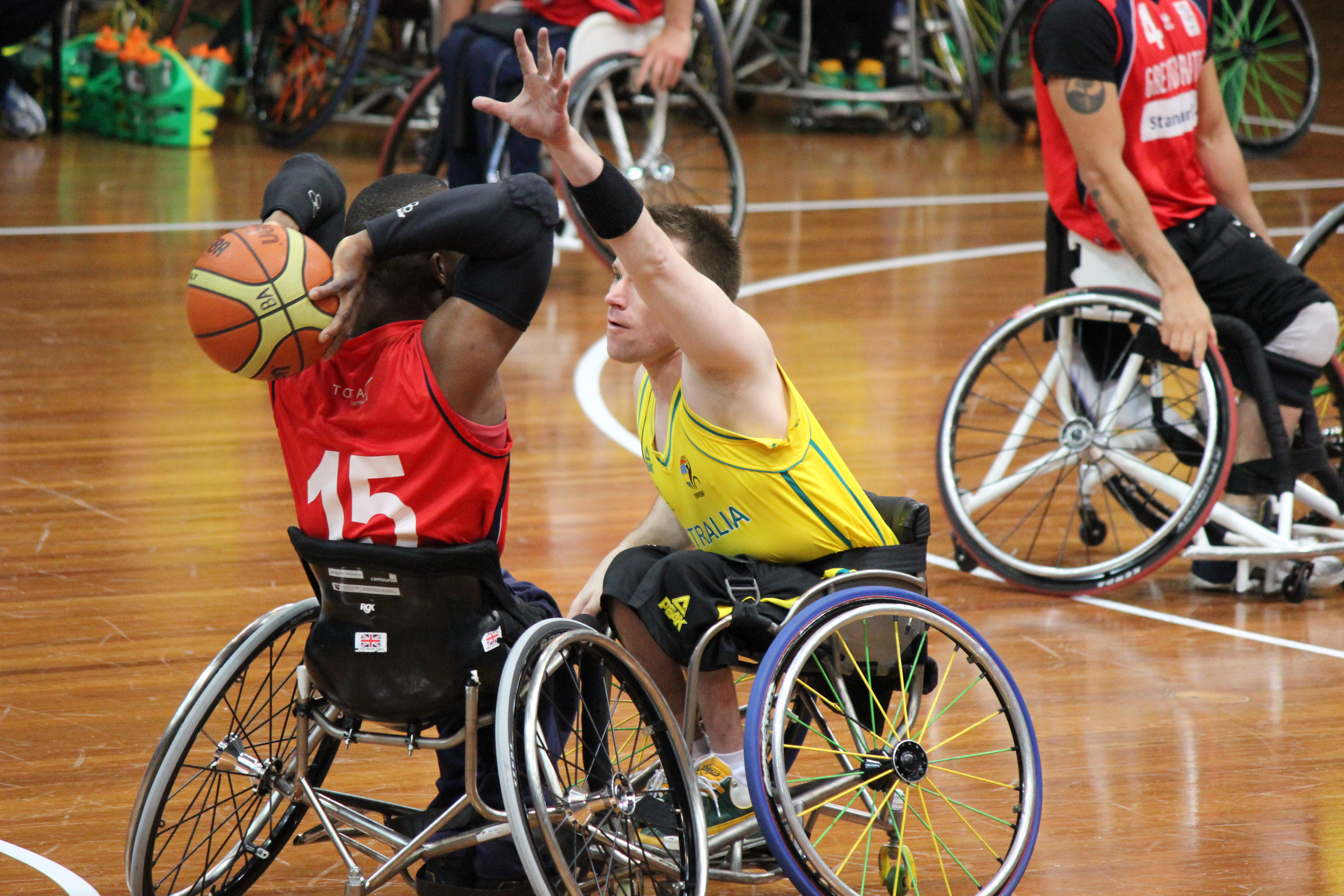
Michael Hartnett of Australia (middle) and Ade Oregembe of Great Britain (left). Australia vs Great Britain Men's National Wheelchair Basketball Team, 19 July 2012, Sydney's Olympic Park.

Hartnett is classified as a 1.0 to 1.5 player, and plays guard. He started playing wheelchair basketball in 1991. His ability to play wheelchair basketball has been supported by the Western Australian Institute of Sport Individual Athlete Support Program.

=== National team ===
Hartnett made Australia's national team for the first time in 1997 when he played for the junior team at the Junior Games held in Victoria, Australia.

==== Paralympics ====
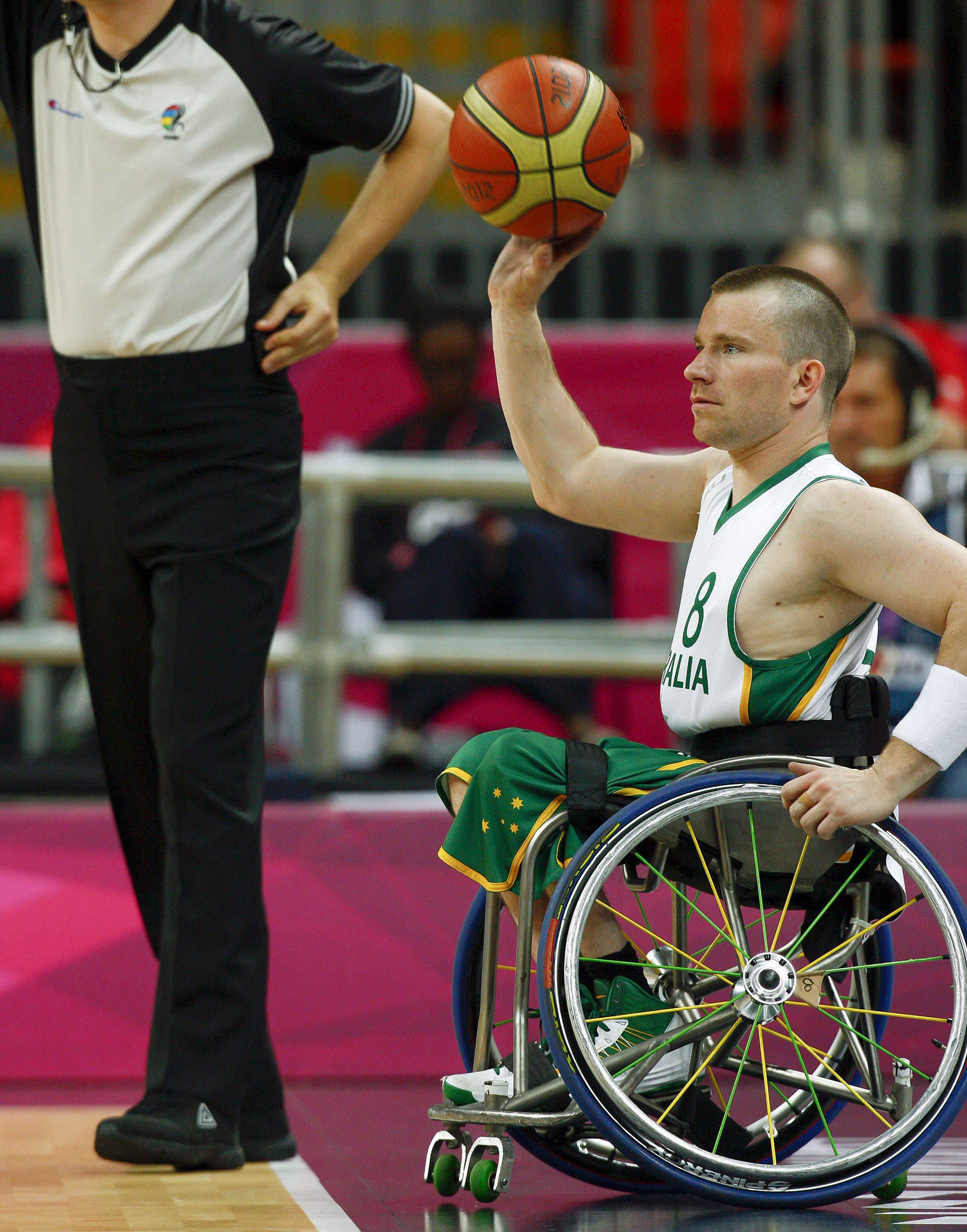
Hartnett at the 2012 London Paralympics

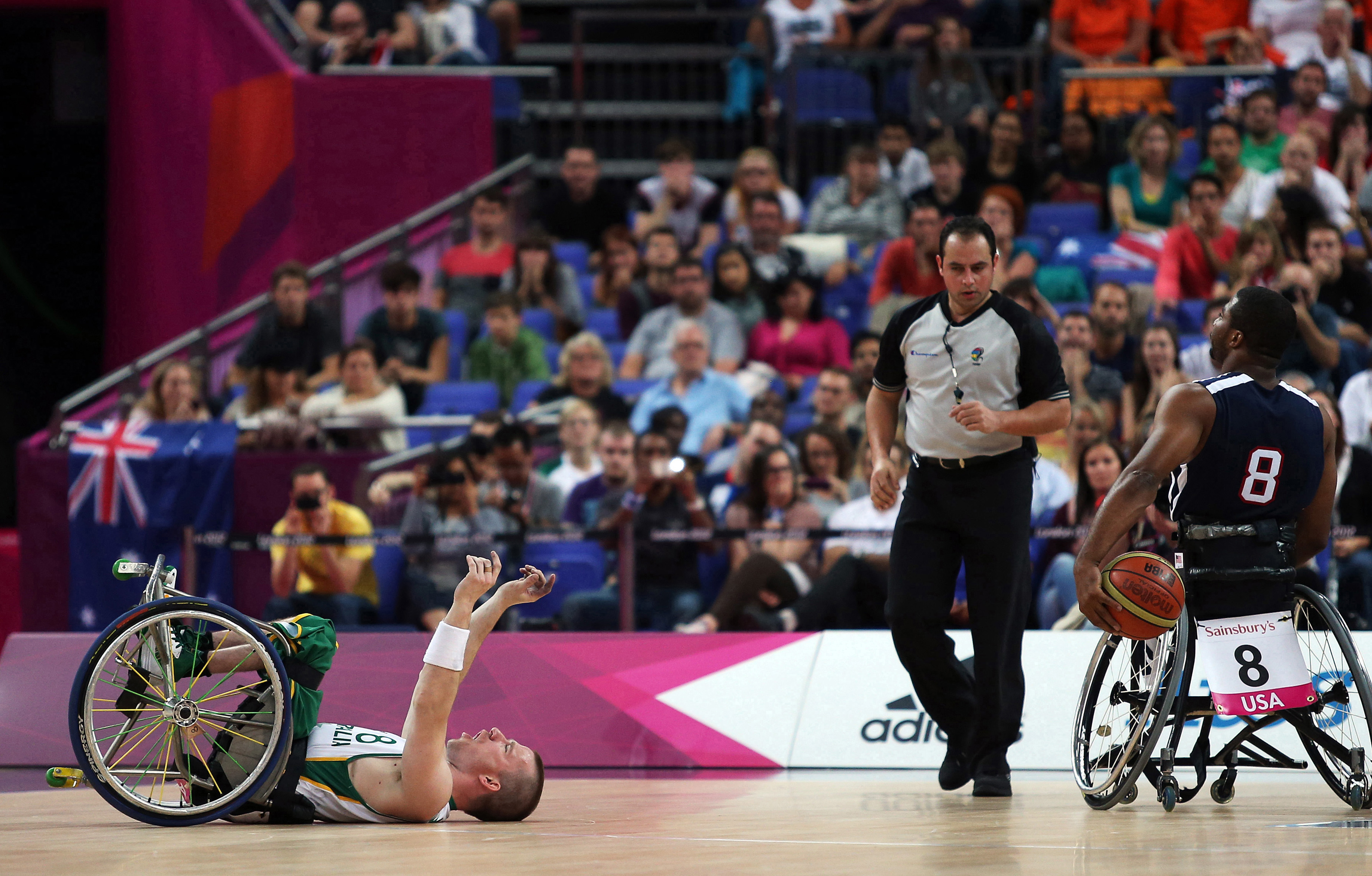
Hartnett at the 2012 London Paralympics

Hartnett was part of the gold medal-winning Australia men's national wheelchair basketball team at the 2008 Summer Paralympics, for which he received a Medal of the Order of Australia.

At the 2012 Summer Paralympics he was part of the Australian men's wheelchair team that won silver.

==== Other competitions ====
Hartnett was part of the 2006 national squad that won silver at the FESPIC Games. He was also part of the 2007 squad that competed at the Paralympic World Cup that won a silver medal. That year, he also competed as part of the national team at the Great Britain Series. In 2008, he was part of the team that took silver at the Beijing Paralympic test event. In 2009, he was part of the Australian gold winning IWBF Asia-Oceania Championship side and the 2009 Rollers World Challenge team that won gold. At the Rollers World Challenge, he was named as one of the competition's All-Star Five. He was a member of the Australia men's national wheelchair basketball team that competed at the 2010 and 2014 Wheelchair Basketball World Championships that won gold medals.

=== Club basketball ===
Hartnett plays club basketball for the Perth Wheelcats of the Australian National Wheelchair Basketball League (NWBL). In 2006 and 2007, he was part of the teams that won the NWBL Championship. He was also part of the 2007 Wheelcats squad that won the World Club Championship. In 2010, he was playing club basketball with Lottomattica Elecom of Rome, Italy. In 2011, he played his club basketball for the Wheelcats. His Perth Wheelcats lost to the Wollongong Roller Hawks in the 2011 NWBL Championship.
