= Carlee Hoffman =

American wheelchair basketball player

Personal information
- Full name: Carlee Hoffman
- Nationality: American
- Born: July 10, 1986 (age 40)

Sport
- Sport: Wheelchair Basketball
- Team: U.S. Paralympic Women's Wheelchair Basketball Team

Achievements and titles
- Paralympic finals: Summer 2008 Paralympic Games, Beijing, China
Medal record
Women's wheelchair basketball
Representing United States
Paralympic Games
Gold medal – first place	2008 Beijing	wheelchair basketball
Gold medal – first place	2004 Athens	wheelchair basketball

Carlee Hoffman (born July 10, 1986) is an American wheelchair basketball player from Cutlerville, Michigan. She plays the power forward position and was a gold medalist for the United States in the 2004 Summer Paralympics in Athens and in the 2008 Summer Paralympics in Beijing. Hoffman is a bilateral below-knee amputee.

== Major achievements ==
- 2006: Silver medal - IWBF Gold Cup (World Championships), Amsterdam, the Netherlands
- 2004: Gold medal - Paralympic Games, Athens, Greece
