= Stephanie Wheeler =

American wheelchair basketball player

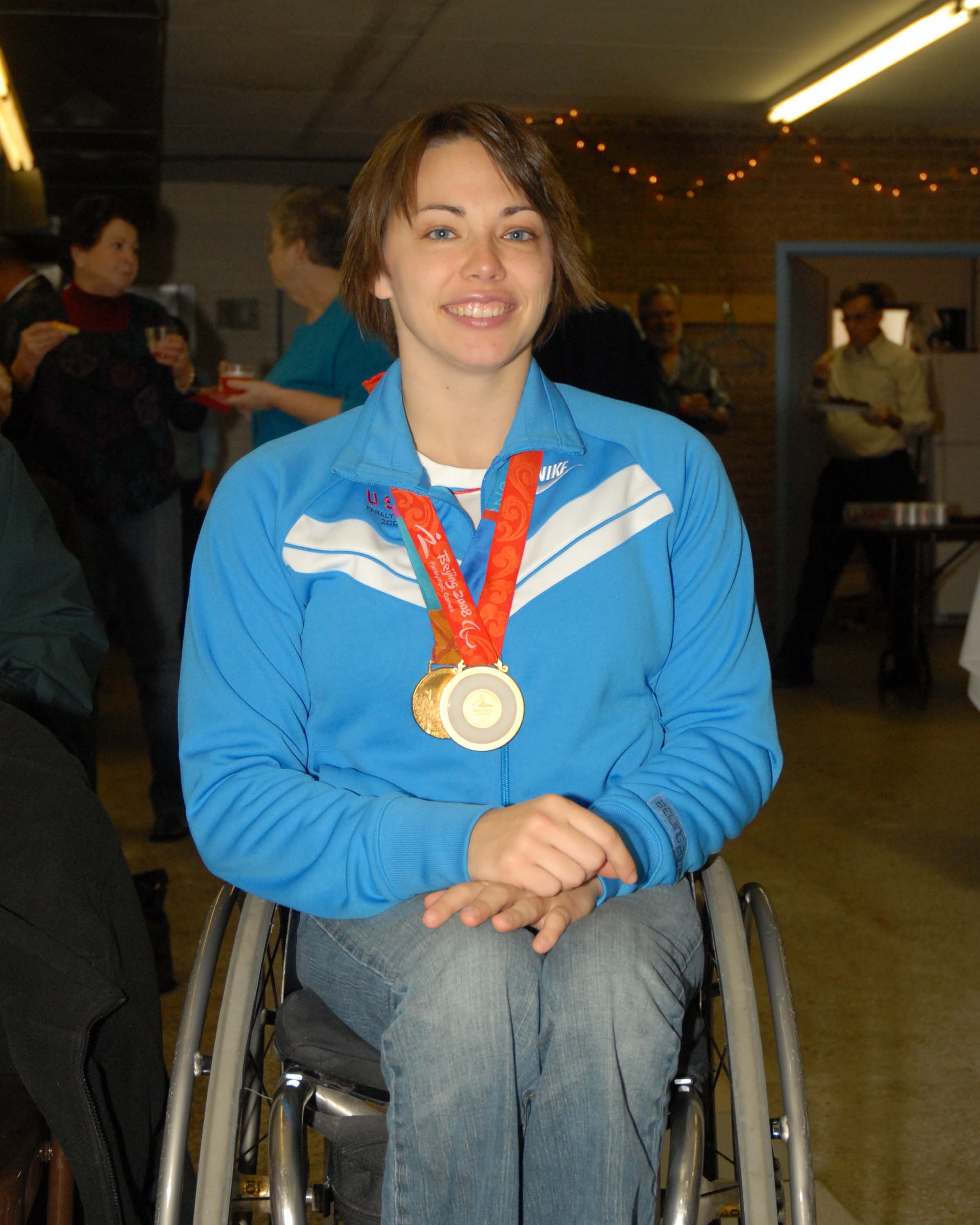
- Wheeler in 2008

Personal information
- Born: 16 January 1981 (age 45) Norlina, North Carolina, United States

Sport
- Sport: Wheelchair basketball
Medal record
Representing United States
Paralympic Games
Gold medal – first place	2004 Athens	Team
Gold medal – first place	2008 Beijing	Team
Parapan American Games
Gold medal – first place	2007 Rio de Janeiro	Team

Stephanie Wheeler (born January 16, 1981) is an American wheelchair basketball player who was on two gold medal-winning Paralympic teams. She also played on the gold medal-winning team at the 2007 Parapan American Games in Rio de Janeiro. She received her degree in kinesiology from the University of Illinois and is working on her doctorate in sports education from the University of Alabama. As of 2010 she is head coach of the University of Illinois wheelchair basketball team, and will return to the Paralympic games in Rio in 2016, now as a coach.

== Introduction to Wheelchair Basketball ==
At age 6, Stephanie became paralyzed after being in a car accident that took her mother's life. As a child, she was an active participant in T-ball and gymnastics, and she wanted to remain active despite her paralysis. At age 12, she joined her local adaptive sports club that only offered one sport: wheelchair basketball.

Several years later, she attended a sports camp at the University of Illinois, where she was able to compete in wheelchair basketball on a larger scale than her hometown of 1000 people in Norlina, North Carolina. Spending time at the university exposed her to what she could achieve if she worked hard and received good grades. As a result, she applied and eventually became a student athlete at the University of Illinois. During her time as a student athlete, she won three national championships in wheelchair basketball. In 2004, she graduated with a degree in kinesiology.

After undergraduate school, she relocated to the University of Alabama, where she received her master's degree in adaptive sport and pedagogy. While she was a student there, she helped grow their new wheelchair basketball program.

== Team USA ==
Many of Stephanie's teammates at the University of Illinois were members of Team USA, and they encouraged her to apply. She did not make the team after her first tryout, but eventually was accepted to the development team in 2001. From there, she competed in the Paralympic games in Athens (2004) and Beijing (2008), winning gold medals at both. The team's gold medal in 2004 was the first gold medal Team USA had won at the Paralympic games in 22 years. While she was on Team USA, they also won 2 World Championship silver medals and 1 gold medal.

== Coaching ==
Stephanie retired from wheelchair basketball as a player in 2010 but wanted to continue her involvement in the sport. The position of head coach at the University of Illinois opened up at the same time as her retirement, so she applied for and received the job. The success of her program at the university led to her being named head coach of Team USA.

== Personal life ==
Throughout her adolescence, Stephanie had dated men, but she began dating women in 2008. Shortly after, she came out as gay to her teammates.
