= Jennifer Chew =

American wheelchair basketball player

Personal information
- Born: 1983 (age 42–43) Walnut Creek, California
- Listed height: 5 ft 4 in (1.63 m)
Medals
Athletics
World Championship
Silver medal – second place	2006 Amsterdam	Team
Gold medal – first place	2010 Birmingham	Team
Parapan American Games
Gold medal – first place	2011 Guadalajara	Team

Jennifer Chew (born 1983) is an American Paralympic wheelchair basketball player from Walnut Creek, California who was a silver medalist at IWBF World Championship in 2006 and won a gold one in 2010 at the same place. She also won a gold medal for her participation at the 2011 Parapan American Games and was a four-time NWWBT Champion.
