= Elaine Allard =

Canadian wheelchair basketball player

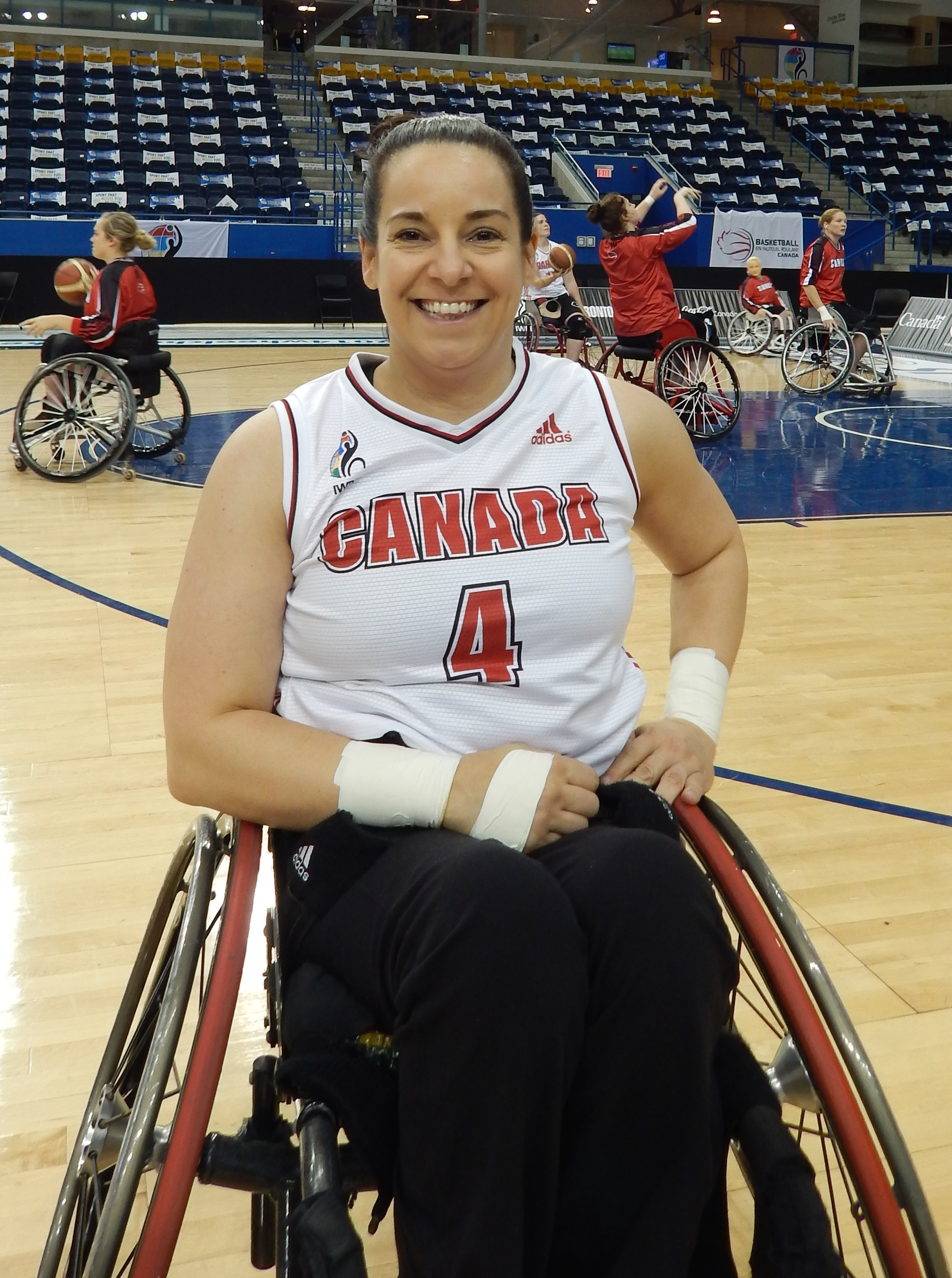
- Team Canada – No 4 – Elaine Allard

Personal information
- Nationality: Canada
- Born: February 25, 1977 (age 49) Montreal, Quebec
- Height: 5 ft 6 in (1.68 m)

Sport
- Sport: Wheelchair basketball
- Disability class: 3.5
- Event: Women's team
- Team: Gladiators de Laval
- Coached by: Marc-Antione Ducharme
Medal record
World Championships
Gold medal – first place	2014 Toronto	Team
Bronze medal – third place	2010 Birmingham	Team
Parapan American Games
Silver medal – second place	2007 Rio de Janeiro	Team
Silver medal – second place	2011 Guadalajara	Team
Silver medal – second place	2015 Toronto	Team

Elaine Allard (born February 25, 1977) is a Canadian 1.5 point wheelchair basketball player who won a bronze medal at the 2010 Wheelchair Basketball World Championship in Birmingham, and gold at the 2014 Women's World Wheelchair Basketball Championship in Toronto.

== Biography ==
Elaine Allard was born in Montreal, Quebec on February 25, 1977. She sustained a spinal cord injury in an accident when she was 16. Before her accident she had participated in many sports, most notably swimming and alpine skiing. She works as an account manager at the Royal Bank of Canada. She speaks English, French and Portuguese, and scuba dives. In 2003, she scaled Kala Patthar in the Himalayas.

Allard took up wheelchair basketball in 1995 as part of her rehabilitation, and within weeks was playing competitively. She is classified as a 1.5 point player. She joined Team Canada in 2007, and played her first international game, against Argentina in a Four Nations tournament in Sydney in 2009, at which Canada won bronze. This was followed by winning silver at the 2010 Wheelchair Basketball World Championship in Birmingham, and then gold at the 2010 BT Paralympic World Cup. She also won silver medals at the 2007 Parapan American Games in Rio de Janeiro, Brazil, and at the 2011 Parapan American Games in Guadalajara, Mexico.

"After becoming a part of the women's national team program and participating at a few international tournaments," she recalled, "it was clear to me that my goal was to become a part of this amazing team. Ultimately, my goal was to represent Canada at the Paralympic Games." Her dream came true when she represented Canada at the 2012 Summer Paralympic Games in London. She was part of the team that won a gold medal at the 2014 Women's World Wheelchair Basketball Championship in Toronto in July 2014, and silver at the 2015 Parapan American Games in August 2015, but was omitted from the team for the 2016 Paralympic Games in Rio de Janeiro due to injury.

Statistics
Competition	Season	Matches	FGM-A	FG%	3PM-A	3P%	FTM-A	FT%	OR-DR	AST	PTS	Source
World Championships	2014	6	1-5	20.0	0-0	0	0-0	0	0-2	0	2	
Paralympic Games	2012	6	3-5	60.0	0-0	0	0-0	0	0-1	1	6	
World Championships	2010	7	5-13	38.5	0-0	0	0-0	0	8-4	6	10	

Key
FGM, FGA, FG%: field goals made, attempted and percentage	3PM, 3PA, 3P%: three-point field goals made, attempted and percentage
FTM, FTA, FT%: free throws made, attempted and percentage	OR, DR: offensive, defensive rebounds
PTS: points	AST: assists

== Awards ==
- Queen Elizabeth II Diamond Jubilee Medal (2013)
