= Simone Kues =

German wheelchair basketball player

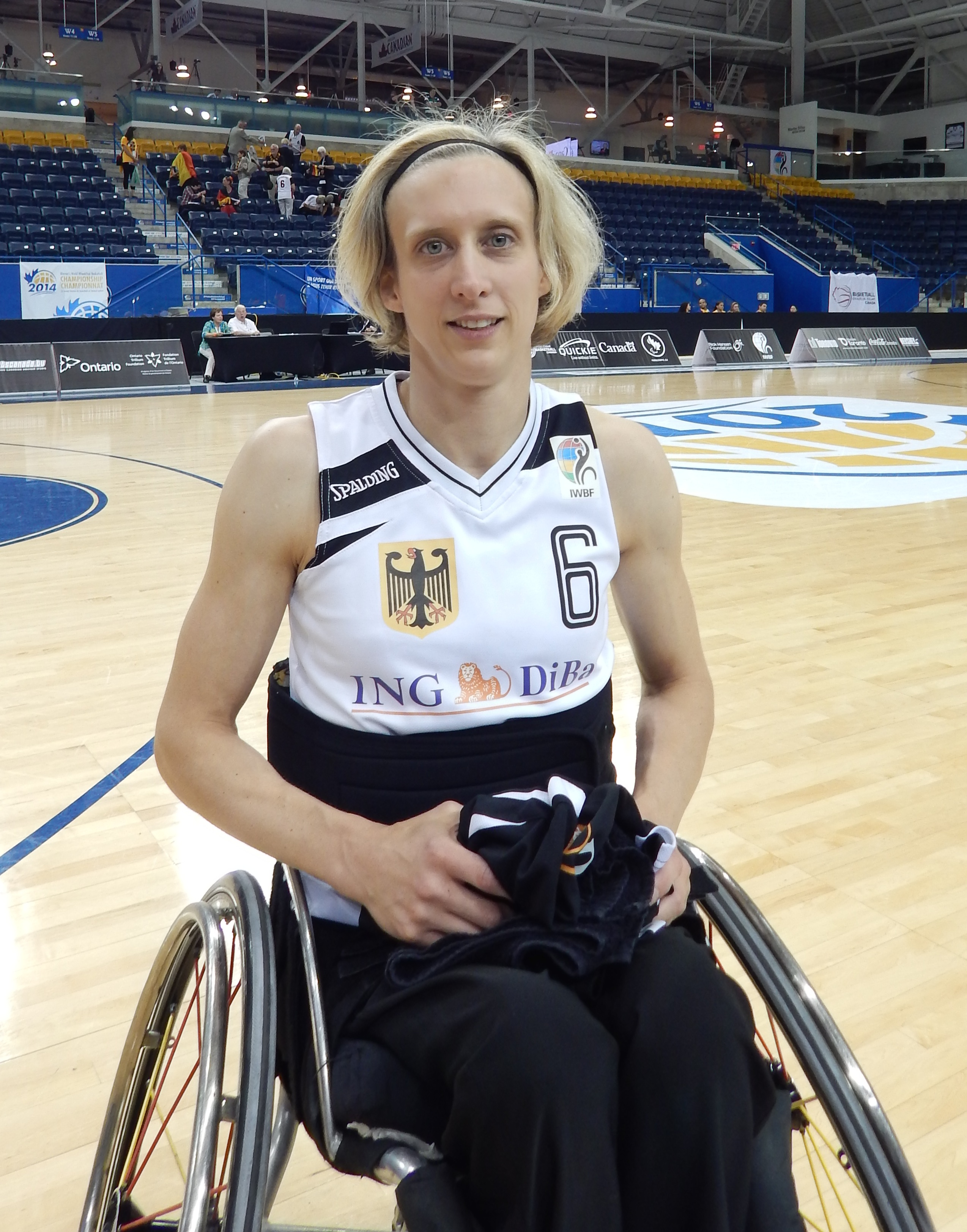

Personal information
- Born: 8 November 1976 (age 49)

Sport
- Country: Germany
- Sport: Wheelchair basketball
- Disability class: 1.5
- Event: Women's team

Achievements and titles
- Paralympic finals: 2008 Paralympics, 2016 Paralympics
Medal record
Wheelchair basketball
Paralympic Games
Silver medal – second place	2008 Beijing	Women's Wheelchair basketball
Silver medal – second place	2016 Rio de Janeiro	Women's Wheelchair basketball
IWBF World Championship
Bronze medal – third place	2006 Amsterdam, Netherlands	Women's wheelchair basketball
Silver medal – second place	2010 Birmingham, Great Britain	Women's wheelchair basketball
Silver medal – second place	2014 Toronto, Canada	Women's wheelchair basketball

Simone Kues (born 8 November 1976) is a German 1.0 point national wheelchair basketball player who plays in the wheelchair basketball league for Hamburg SV. She joined the national team, and participated in the 2004 Summer Paralympics in Athens, at which the German team came fourth. She won bronze at the World Wheelchair Basketball Championships in Amsterdam in 2006. Her team were won the European championship in 2005, 2007 and 2009. She won a silver medal at the 2008 Summer Paralympics in Beijing. The women's national team were voted Team of the Year in disabled sports in 2008, and President Horst Köhler awarded them the Silver Laurel Leaf, Germany's highest German sports award.

== Biography ==
Kues was born in Einbeck in Lower Saxony on 8 November 1976. She matriculated from the Paul-Gerhardt-Schule Dassel in 1996. That same year she had a riding accident in Ireland, which resulted in paralysis. After rehab, she began studying psychology in Göttingen in 1998, and then devoted herself to her sport career. She graduated in 2007, and now works as a psychologist at the BG Trauma Hospital Hamburg's paraplegic centre.

Kues first played wheelchair basketball at the rehab clinic. She went on to play for ASC Göttingen, then with RBV Lüneburg, and finally with SV Hamburg. She joined the national team, and participated in the 2004 Summer Paralympics in Athens, at which the German team came fourth. She won bronze at the World Wheelchair Basketball Championships in Amsterdam in 2006. Her team won the European championship in 2005, 2007 and 2009, and a silver medal at the 2008 Summer Paralympics in Beijing. The women's national team were voted Team of the Year in disabled sports in 2008, and President Horst Köhler awarded them the Silver Laurel Leaf, Germany's highest German sports award.

In June 2014, Kues rejoined the senior women's team for the 2014 Women's World Wheelchair Basketball Championship in Toronto, Canada. The German team won silver after being defeated by Canada in the final. The German team beat the Netherlands in the 2015 European Championships, to claim its tenth European title. At the 2016 Paralympic Games, it won silver after losing the final to the United States.

== Achievements ==
- 2005: Gold at European championship (Villeneuve d'Ascq, France)
- 2006: Bronze World Championship (Amsterdam, Netherlands)
- 2007: Gold European Championship (Wetzlar, Germany)
- 2008: Silver 2008 Summer Paralympics (Beijing, China)
- 2009: Gold European Championship (Stoke Mandeville, England)
- 2010: Silver at the World Championships (Birmingham, England)
- 2014: Silver at the World Championships (Toronto, Canada)
- 2015: Gold at the European Championships (Worcester, England)
- 2016: Silver at the Paralympic Games (Rio de Janeiro, Brazil)

== Awards ==
- 2008: Silver Laurel Leaf
