= Elisha Williams (basketball) =

Canadian wheelchair basketball player

Personal information
- Born: June 9, 1978 (age 48) Prince George, British Columbia
- Listed height: 5 ft 10 in (1.78 m)
Medals
Athletics
Paralympic Games
Silver medal – second place	2007 Rio de Janeiro	Women's wheelchair basketball
Silver medal – second place	2011 Guadalajara	Women's wheelchair basketball

Elisha Williams (born June 9, 1978) is a Canadian Paralympic wheelchair basketball player who won 2 silver medals in 2007 and 2011 respectively. In 2008 she was awarded with the British Columbia Premiere's Athletic Award and 5 years later got the Queen Elizabeth II Diamond Jubilee Medal.
