= Tara Feser =

Canadian wheelchair basketball player

No. 15 – Trier Dolphins

Personal information
- Born: February 2, 1980 (age 46) Saint Albert, Alberta, Canada
Medals
Women's wheelchair basketball
Representing Canada
World Championship
Bronze medal – third place	2010 Birmingham	Team
Parapan American Games
Silver medal – second place	2011 Guadalajara	Team

Tara Feser (born February 2, 1980) is a Canadian wheelchair basketball player and Paralympian.

She started playing wheelchair basketball after graduating from high School in 1988 because of knee dislocation. Back in high school, she used to play regular basketball.

She has been part of Canada Women's National Wheelchair Basketball Team since 2008.

She was part of the Canadian team that came in 5th place in the women's wheelchair basketball at the 2008 Summer Paralympics.
