= Canada at the 2004 Summer Paralympics =

- Flag of Canada
- IPC code: CAN
- NPC: Canadian Paralympic Committee
- Website: www.paralympic.ca

in Athens
- Competitors: 143 in 15 sports
- Flag bearer: Chantal Benoit
- Medals Ranked 3rd: Gold 28 Silver 19 Bronze 25 Total 72

Summer Paralympics appearances (overview)
- 1968; 1972; 1976; 1980; 1984; 1988; 1992; 1996; 2000; 2004; 2008; 2012; 2016; 2020; 2024

Canada participated in the 2004 Summer Paralympics in Athens, Greece. With 28 gold, 19 silver, and 25 bronze medals, the Canadian team placed third in the medal rankings, behind China and Great Britain. Wheelchair basketball player and three-time Paralympic gold medallist Chantal Benoit was the delegation's flag bearer at the opening ceremony.

Chantal Petitclerc ties the 5 gold medal record at a single Games for a Canadian, tying Stéphanie Dixon, who set the record at the 2000 Summer Paralympics.

== Medallists ==
Medal	Name	Sport	Event
Gold	Andre Beaudoin	Athletics	Men's 200m T52
Gold	Chelsea Clark	Athletics	Women's 100m T34
Gold	Chantal Petitclerc	Athletics	Women's 100m T54
Gold	Chelsea Clark	Athletics	Women's 200m T34
Gold	Lisa Franks	Athletics	Women's 200m T52
Gold	Chantal Petitclerc	Athletics	Women's 200m T54
Gold	Lisa Franks	Athletics	Women's 400m T52
Gold	Chantal Petitclerc	Athletics	Women's 400m T54
Gold	Chantal Petitclerc	Athletics	Women's 800m T54
Gold	Chantal Petitclerc	Athletics	Women's 1500m T54
Gold	Paul Gauthier	Boccia	Individual BC3
Gold	Kelley Hannett; Amy Alsop; Contessa Scott; Annette Lisabeth; Viviane Forest; Nancy Morin	Goalball	Women's team
Gold	Benoît Huot	Swimming	Men's 50m freestyle S10
Gold	Benoît Huot	Swimming	Men's 100m freestyle S10
Gold	Benoît Huot	Swimming	Men's 400m freestyle S10
Gold	Walter Wu	Swimming	Men's 400m freestyle S13
Gold	Benoît Huot	Swimming	Men's 100m butterfly S10
Gold	Benoît Huot	Swimming	Men's 200m individual medley SM10
Gold	Anne Polinario	Swimming	Women's 50m freestyle S10
Gold	Kirby Cote	Swimming	Women's 50m freestyle S13
Gold	Anne Polinario	Swimming	Women's 100m freestyle S10
Gold	Kirby Cote	Swimming	Women's 100m freestyle S13
Gold	Kirby Cote	Swimming	Women's 400m freestyle S13
Gold	Kirby Cote	Swimming	Women's 100m butterfly S13
Gold	Stephanie Dixon	Swimming	Women's 100m backstroke S9
Gold	Chelsey Gotell	Swimming	Women's 100m backstroke S13
Gold	Kirby Cote	Swimming	Women's 200m individual medley SM13
Gold	David Durepos; David Eng; Travis Gaertner; Chris Stoutenburg; Patrick Anderson; Jaimie Borisoff; Adam Lancia; Ross Norton; Joey Johnson; Richard Peter; Roy Henderson; Brad Bowden	Wheelchair basketball	Men's team
Silver	Andre Beaudoin	Athletics	Men's 400m T52
Silver	Jason Dunkerley	Athletics	Men's 1500m T11
Silver	Kelly Smith	Athletics	Men's marathon T54
Silver	Chelsea Lariviere	Athletics	Women's 100m T34
Silver	Donovan Tildesley	Swimming	Men's 400m freestyle S11
Silver	Benoît Huot	Swimming	Men's 100m backstroke S10
Silver	Walter Wu	Swimming	Men's 100m backstroke S13
Silver	Donovan Tildesley	Swimming	Men's 200m individual medley SM11
Silver	Walter Wu	Swimming	Men's 200m individual medley SM13
Silver	Stephanie Dixon	Swimming	Women's 100m freestyle S9
Silver	Stephanie Dixon	Swimming	Women's 400m freestyle S9
Silver	Kirby Cote	Swimming	Women's 100m breaststroke SB13
Silver	Anne Polinario	Swimming	Women's 100m backstroke S10
Silver	Kirby Cote	Swimming	Women's 100m backstroke S13
Silver	Stephanie Dixon	Swimming	Women's 200m individual medley SM9
Silver	Anne Polinario; Danielle Campo; Andrea Cole; Stephanie Dixon	Swimming	Women's 4x100m freestyle relay 34pts
Silver	Stephanie Dixon; Anne Polinario; Elisabeth Walker; Darda Geiger	Swimming	Women's 4x100m medley relay 34pts
Silver	Allan Cartrand; Fabien Lavoie; Jared Funk; David Willsie; Patrice Simard; Mike Bacon; Michael Whitehead; Daniel Paradis; Raymond Lizotte; Garett Hickling; Ian Chan; Allam Semenuik	Wheelchair rugby	Mixed wheelchair rugby
Bronze	Andre Beaudoin	Athletics	Men's 100m T52
Bronze	Jeff Adams	Athletics	Men's 400m T54
Bronze	Stuart McGregor	Athletics	Men's 800m T13
Bronze	Dean Bergeron	Athletics	Men's 800m T52
Bronze	Clayton Gerein	Athletics	Men's marathon T52
Bronze	France Gagne	Athletics	Men's javelin throw F13
Bronze	Diane Roy	Athletics	Women's 400m T54
Bronze	Jessica Matassa	Athletics	Women's 800m T54
Bronze	Diane Roy	Athletics	Women's 1500m T54
Bronze	Courtney Knight	Athletics	Women's discus throw F13
Bronze	Paul Gauthier; Alison Kabush	Boccia	Pairs BC3
Bronze	Karen Brain	Equestrian	Individual championship dressage grade IV
Bronze	Karen Brain	Equestrian	Individual freestyle dressage grade IV
Bronze	Donovan Tildesley	Swimming	Men's 100m freestyle S11
Bronze	Brian Hill	Swimming	Men's 400m freestyle S13
Bronze	Brian Hill	Swimming	Men's 100m backstroke S13
Bronze	Danielle Campo	Swimming	Women's 50m freestyle S7
Bronze	Stephanie Dixon	Swimming	Women's 50m freestyle S9
Bronze	Chelsey Gotell	Swimming	Women's 50m freestyle S13
Bronze	Chelsey Gotell	Swimming	Women's 100m freestyle S13
Bronze	Danielle Campo	Swimming	Women's 400m freestyle S7
Bronze	Elisabeth Walker	Swimming	Women's 50m butterfly S7
Bronze	Andrea Cole	Swimming	Women's 100m butterfly S8
Bronze	Chelsey Gotell	Swimming	Women's 200m individual medley SM13
Bronze	Sabrina Pettinicchi; Tracey Ferguson; Lori Radke; Linda Kutrowski; Danielle Peers; Shira Golden; Chantal Benoit; Arley McNeney; Karla Tritten; Kendra Ohama; Marni Abbott; Jennifer Krempien	Wheelchair basketball	Women's team

== Competitors and results by event ==
=== Athletics ===
==== Men's track events ====
Athlete	Class	Event	Heats		Semifinal		Final	
Athlete	Class	Event	Result	Rank	Result	Rank	Result	Rank
Jeff Adams	T54	800m	1:35.99	9	did not advance			
Jeff Adams	T54	1500m	3:07.99	18 Q	3:04.69	2 Q	3:05.97	5
Andre Beaudoin	T52	100m	—N/a				17.70	3rd place, bronze medalist(s)
Andre Beaudoin	T52	200m	32.31	1 Q	—N/a		31.22	1st place, gold medalist(s)
Andre Beaudoin	T52	800m	2:10.94	6 Q	—N/a		2:02.99	5
Jacques Bouchard	T53	100m	16.61	15	did not advance			
Jacques Bouchard	T53	200m	28.79	17	did not advance			
Alan Bergman	T54	10000m	22:27.76	22	did not advance			
Alan Bergman	T54	Marathon	—N/a				1:37.40	13
Dean Bergeron	T52	800m	2:05.33	3 Q	—N/a		2:00.42	3rd place, bronze medalist(s)
Dean Bergeron	T52	1500m	3:54.76	2 Q	—N/a		DNF	
Jason Dunkerley	T12	800m	2:03.54	9	did not advance			
Michel Filteau	T54	5000m	10:37.37	22	did not advance			
Michel Filteau	T54	10000m	21:10.13	8 q	—N/a		21:55.14	12
Michel Filteau	T54	Marathon	N/A				1:48.17	23
Eric Flemming	T35	100m	15.07	8 q	—N/a		15.08	7
Eric Gauthier	T53	100m	16.01	12	did not advance			
Eric Gauthier	T53	200m	27.51	9	did not advance			
Eric Gauthier	T53	800m	1:42.43	8 q	—N/a		1:43.35	8
Clayton Gerein	T52	1500m	4:08.07	6 q	—N/a		3:58.88	4
Clayton Gerein	T52	5000m	—N/a				13:48.82	5
Clayton Gerein	T52	Marathon	—N/a				2:14:26	3rd place, bronze medalist(s)
Jason Lachance	T53	100m	16.12	14	did not advance			
Jason Lachance	T53	200m	28.24	13	did not advance			
Carl Marquis	T54	800m	1:41.84	21	did not advance			
Carl Marquis	T54	1500m	3:06.26	17	did not advance			
Carl Marquis	T54	10000m	22:54.05	21	did not advance			
Stuart McGregor	T13	400m	—N/a				51.02	5
Stuart McGregor	T13	800m	—N/a				1:56.93	3rd place, bronze medalist(s)
Daniel Normandin	T54	100m	15.09	13 q	15.47	16	did not advance	
Daniel Normandin	T54	200m	27.30	16	did not advance			
Joseph Radmore	T52	100m	—N/a				18.17	5
Richard Reelie	T52	800m	2:12.02	8 q	—N/a		2:05.58	6
Richard Reelie	T52	1500m	4:03.98	5 Q	—N/a		4:07.64	7
Richard Reelie	T52	5000m	—N/a				13:49.15	6
Kelly Smith	T54	1500m	3:05.22	11 Q	3:09.23	15	did not advance	
Kelly Smith	T54	5000m	10.25.44	5 q	—N/a		10:25.52	7
Kelly Smith	T54	Marathon	—N/a				1:29:39	2nd place, silver medalist(s)
Curtis Thom	T54	800m	1:38.80	15	did not advance			
Dustin Walsh	T11	400m	53.81	3 Q	55.53	6	did not advance	
Daniel Normandin; Brent Lakatos; Eric Gauthier; Curtis Thom	T53-54	4x100m relay	53.94	4 q	—N/a		54.10	4
Carl Marquis; Brent Lakatos; Curtis Thom; Eric Gauthier	T53-54	4x400m relay	3:23.87	8	did not advance			

==== Men's field events ====
Athlete	Class	Event	Final		
Athlete	Class	Event	Result	Points	Rank
Eric Flemming	F35	Javelin	33.16	-	7
France Gagne	F13	Discus	39.25	-	4
France Gagne	F13	Javelin	50.01	-	3rd place, bronze medalist(s)
Jacques Martin	F55	Discus	31.10	-	4
Jacques Martin	F55	Javelin	25.41	869	14
Kyle Pettey	F35	Discus	38.05	-	5
Kyle Pettey	F35	Shot put	10.17	-	9
Shane Risto	F35	Shot put	10.52	-	8
Andy Shaw	F37	Javelin	37.86	-	6
James Shaw	F38	Discus	37.42	-	5
James Shaw	F38	Shot put	11.56	-	7

==== Women's track events ====
Athlete	Class	Event	Heats		Final	
Athlete	Class	Event	Result	Rank	Result	Rank
Chelsea Clark	T34	100m	—N/a		19.68 WR	1st place, gold medalist(s)
Chelsea Clark	T34	200m	—N/a		34.55	1st place, gold medalist(s)
Lisa Franks	T52	200m	36.63 WR	1 Q	36.72	1st place, gold medalist(s)
Lisa Franks	T52	400m	1:11.95	1 Q	1:09.52 WR	1st place, gold medalist(s)
Chelsea Lariviere	T34	100m	—N/a		19.83	2nd place, silver medalist(s)
Chelsea Lariviere	T34	200m	—N/a		37.28	4
Karen March	T52	200m	43.45	8 Q	45.34	8
Jessica Matassa	T54	800m	1:53.44	4 Q	1:51.98	3rd place, bronze medalist(s)
Chantal Petitclerc	T54	100m	16.45 WR	1 Q	16.33 WR	1st place, gold medalist(s)
Chantal Petitclerc	T54	200m	29.14	1 Q	28.95	1st place, gold medalist(s)
Chantal Petitclerc	T54	400m	—N/a			1st place, gold medalist(s)
Chantal Petitclerc	T54	800m	1:53.28	2 Q	1:50.69	1st place, gold medalist(s)
Chantal Petitclerc	T54	1500m	3:38.02	7 Q	3:26.89 WR	1st place, gold medalist(s)
Diane Roy	T54	400m	—N/a			3rd place, bronze medalist(s)
Diane Roy	T54	800m	1:53.44	3 Q	1:52.14	5
Diane Roy	T54	1500m	3:36.01	1 Q	3:28.62	3rd place, bronze medalist(s)
Diane Roy	T54	5000m	12:18.99	5 Q	12:00.07	4
Diane Roy	T54	Marathon	—N/a		2:02.42	6
Teri Thorson	T52	400m	1:26.83	8 q	1:25.62	8

==== Women's field events ====
Athlete	Class	Event	Final		
Athlete	Class	Event	Result	Points	Rank
Andrea Holmes	F44/46	Long jump	4.16	1034	8
Courtney Knight	F13	Discus	38.29	-	3rd place, bronze medalist(s)
Kris Vriend	F35/36	Discus	NMR		
Kris Vriend	F35/36	Shot put	7.99	1029	8
Katie Wallace	F35/36	Shot put	6.20	892	10

=== Boccia ===
==== Individual events ====
Athlete	Event	Preliminary matches			Round of 16	Quarterfinals	Semifinals	Final	
Athlete	Event	Opponent	Opposition Score	Rank	Opposition Score	Opposition Score	Opposition Score	Opposition Score	Rank
Francois Bourbonniere	Mixed individual BC2	Curto (ESP)	L 1-4	4	did not advance				
Francois Bourbonniere	Mixed individual BC2	Cortez (ARG)	L 3-6	4	did not advance				
Francois Bourbonniere	Mixed individual BC2	John (HKG)	L 0-13	4	did not advance				
Daniel Gauthier	Mixed individual BC4	Wing (HKG)	L 0-16	5	did not advance				
Daniel Gauthier	Mixed individual BC4	Streharsky (SVK)	L 0-10	5	did not advance				
Daniel Gauthier	Mixed individual BC4	Durkovic (SVK)	L 2-5	5	did not advance				
Daniel Gauthier	Mixed individual BC4	Chi (HKG)	L 0-12	5	did not advance				
Paul Gauthier	Mixed individual BC3	Rodriguez (ESP)	L 3-5	1	—N/a	Kabush (CAN); W 5-1	Hoon (KOR); W 3-1	Pesquera (ESP); W 7-1	1st place, gold medalist(s)
Paul Gauthier	Mixed individual BC3	Jackson (NZL)	W 5-3	1	—N/a	Kabush (CAN); W 5-1	Hoon (KOR); W 3-1	Pesquera (ESP); W 7-1	1st place, gold medalist(s)
Paul Gauthier	Mixed individual BC3	Hyeon (KOR)	W 6-3	1	—N/a	Kabush (CAN); W 5-1	Hoon (KOR); W 3-1	Pesquera (ESP); W 7-1	1st place, gold medalist(s)
Alison Kabush	Mixed individual BC3	Pesquera (ESP)	L 2-3	2	—N/a	Gauthier (CAN); L 1-5	did not advance		
Alison Kabush	Mixed individual BC3	Krenek (CZE)	W 9-0	2	—N/a	Gauthier (CAN); L 1-5	did not advance		
Alison Kabush	Mixed individual BC3	O'Grady (IRL)	W 6-4	2	—N/a	Gauthier (CAN); L 1-5	did not advance		
Mirane Lanoix-Boyer	Mixed individual BC1	Jorgensen (DEN)	L 0-16	5	did not advance				
Mirane Lanoix-Boyer	Mixed individual BC1	Grossmayer (AUT)	L 2-5	5	did not advance				
Mirane Lanoix-Boyer	Mixed individual BC1	Ibarburen (ARG)	L 5-7	5	did not advance				
Mirane Lanoix-Boyer	Mixed individual BC1	Hawker (USA)	L 1-4	5	did not advance				
Tammy McLeod	Mixed individual BC2	Silva (POR)	L 0-16	2	Curto (ESP); L 3-7	did not advance			
Tammy McLeod	Mixed individual BC2	Maleemao (THA)	W 5-2	2	Curto (ESP); L 3-7	did not advance			
Tammy McLeod	Mixed individual BC2	Olsen (NOR)	W 3-2	2	Curto (ESP); L 3-7	did not advance			
Josh Vandervies	Mixed individual BC4	Dueso (ESP)	L 1-6	4	did not advance				
Josh Vandervies	Mixed individual BC4	de Oliveira Pereira (POR)	W 7-3	4	did not advance				
Josh Vandervies	Mixed individual BC4	Mourtos (GRE)	L 3-4	4	did not advance				
Josh Vandervies	Mixed individual BC4	Ledesma (ARG)	L 2-7	4	did not advance				
David Vanhoek	Mixed individual BC1	Sanders (NZL)	L 2-6	5	did not advance				
David Vanhoek	Mixed individual BC1	Fernandez (POR)	L 2-9	5	did not advance				
David Vanhoek	Mixed individual BC1	Prossegger (AUT)	L 1-7	5	did not advance				
David Vanhoek	Mixed individual BC1	Robinson (GBR)	W 7-5	5	did not advance				
David Vanhoek	Mixed individual BC1	Cid (ESP)	W/O	5	did not advance				

==== Pairs and team events ====
Athlete	Event	Preliminary matches			Semifinals	Final	
Athlete	Event	Opponent	Opposition Score	Rank	Opposition Score	Opposition Score	Rank
Paul Gauthier; Alison Kabush	Mixed pairs BC3	Hyeon (KOR) / Hoon (KOR)	L 1-7	2	Pesquera (ESP) / Rodriguez (ESP); L 0-6	Jackson (NZL) / Dijkstra (NZL); W 4-3	3rd place, bronze medalist(s)
Paul Gauthier; Alison Kabush	Mixed pairs BC3	Macedo (POR) / Costa (POR)	W 4-3	2	Pesquera (ESP) / Rodriguez (ESP); L 0-6	Jackson (NZL) / Dijkstra (NZL); W 4-3	3rd place, bronze medalist(s)
Paul Gauthier; Alison Kabush	Mixed pairs BC3	Hanso (USA) / Samuel Williams (USA)	W 6-0	2	Pesquera (ESP) / Rodriguez (ESP); L 0-6	Jackson (NZL) / Dijkstra (NZL); W 4-3	3rd place, bronze medalist(s)
Daniel Gauthier; Josh Vandervies	Mixed pairs BC4	Chi (HKG) / Wing (HKG)	L 0-10	6	did not advance		
Daniel Gauthier; Josh Vandervies	Mixed pairs BC4	de Oliveira Pereira (POR); Valentim (POR)	L 0-9	6	did not advance		
Daniel Gauthier; Josh Vandervies	Mixed pairs BC4	Beres (HUN) / Gyurkota (HUN)	L 2-4	6	did not advance		
Daniel Gauthier; Josh Vandervies	Mixed pairs BC4	Durkovic (SVK) / Streharsky (SVK)	L 2-5	6	did not advance		
Daniel Gauthier; Josh Vandervies	Mixed pairs BC4	Gomez (ESP) / Dueso (ESP)	L 1-7	6	did not advance		
Francois Bourbonniere; Tammy McLeod; Mirane Lanoix-Boyer; David Vanhoek	Mixed teams BC1-BC2	Spain (ESP)	L 4-8	5	did not advance		
Francois Bourbonniere; Tammy McLeod; Mirane Lanoix-Boyer; David Vanhoek	Mixed teams BC1-BC2	Austria (AUT)	L 5-7	5	did not advance		
Francois Bourbonniere; Tammy McLeod; Mirane Lanoix-Boyer; David Vanhoek	Mixed teams BC1-BC2	Argentina (ARG)	L 3-12	5	did not advance		
Francois Bourbonniere; Tammy McLeod; Mirane Lanoix-Boyer; David Vanhoek	Mixed teams BC1-BC2	Norway (NOR)	W 6-5	5	did not advance		

=== Cycling ===
==== Road ====
Athlete	Event	Time	Rank
Mark Beggs	Men's hand cycle road race HC div B/C	OVL	11
Mark Beggs	Men's hand cycle time trial HC div B/C	21:08.97	12
Paul Jalbert	Men's tricycle road race CP div 1/2	57:50	7
Paul Jalbert	Men's tricycle time CP div 1/2	12:19.86	8
Stephane Cote; Pierreolivier Boily	Men's road race/time trial tandem B1-3	3:07:27	5
Lisa Sweeney; Shawn Marsolais	Women's road race/time trial tandem B1-3	2:06.56	7

==== Track ====
Athlete	Event	Qualification		Final	
Athlete	Event	Time	Rank	Opposition Time	Rank
Marc Breton	Men's individual pursuit LC1	5:17.56	9	did not advance	
Marc Breton	Men's 1km time trial LC1-4	—N/a		1:18.21	28
Bruce Penner	Men's individual pursuit LC4	4:50.01	6	did not advance	
Bruce Penner	Men's 1km time trial LC1-4	—N/a		1:20.06	32
Jean Quevillon	Men's individual pursuit CP div 3	DSQ			
Jean Quevillon	Men's 1km time trial CP div 3/4	—N/a		1:16.78	10
Stephane Cote; Pierreolivier Boily	Men's individual pursuit tandem B1-3	4:38.04	6 Q	Sharpe (GBR) / Hunter (GBR)	L OVL
Stephane Cote; Pierreolivier Boily	Men's 1km time trial tandem B1-3	—N/a		1:07.82	10
Brian Cowie; Murray Solem	Men's individual pursuit tandem B1-3	4:39.35	8 Q	Modra (AUS) / Crowe (AUS)	L OVL
Brian Cowie; Murray Solem	Men's sprint tandem B1-3	11:521	11	did not advance	
Brian Cowie; Murray Solem	Men's 1km time trial tandem B1-3	—N/a		1:07.00	12
Marc Breton; Bruce Penner; Jean Quevillion	Men's team sprint LC1-4/CP 3/4	1:04.453	8	Australia (AUS); L 1:08.817	7
Lisa Sweeney; Shawn Marsolais	Women's individual pursuit tandem B1-3	3:54.83	8 Q	Whitsell (USA) / Compton (USA)	L OVL
Lisa Sweeney; Shawn Marsolais	Women's sprint tandem B1-3	13.352	5	Xu (CHN) / Yan (CHN)	L OVL
Lisa Sweeney; Shawn Marsolais	Women's 1km time trial tandem B1-3	—N/a		1:18.73	12

=== Equestrian ===
==== Individual ====
Athlete	Event	Total	
Athlete	Event	Score	Rank
Dax Adam	Individual championship test grade II	60.727	14
Dax Adam	Individual freestyle test grade II	64.556	16
Lauren Barwick	Individual championship test grade II	68.000	7
Lauren Barwick	Individual freestyle test grade II	73.056	6
Karen Brain	Individual championship test grade IV	69.677	3rd place, bronze medalist(s)
Karen Brain	Individual freestyle test grade IV	77.227	3rd place, bronze medalist(s)
Judi Island	Individual championship test grade I	65.158	11
Judi Island	Individual freestyle test grade I	DNS	

==== Mixed team ====
Athlete	Event	Total	
Judi Island; Lauren Barwick; Dax Adam; Karen Brain	Team	389.976	9

=== Judo ===
Athlete	Event	Preliminary	Quarterfinals	Semifinals	Repechage round 1	Repechage round 2	Final/ Bronze medal contest
Athlete	Event	Opposition Result	Opposition Result	Opposition Result	Opposition Result	Opposition Result	Opposition Result
Bill Morgan	81 kg	Vlasov (RUS); L 0000–1000	did not advance		Gonzalez (ESP); W 1000-0000	Lopez (USA); W 1000-0010	Vincze (HUN); L 0100-1000

=== Powerlifting ===
Athlete	Event	Result	Rank
Kenneth Doyle	Men's 82.5 kg	197.5	4

=== Sailing ===
==== Mixed 2.4mR class ====
- Bruce Miller - 9th.

==== Mixed Sonar class ====
- Brian MacDonald and Brian Mackie - 7th.

=== Shooting ===
==== Men ====
Athlete	Event	Qualification		Final		
Athlete	Event	Score	Rank	Score	Total	Rank
Bruce Heidt	Mixed 10m air rifle prone SH2	598	10	did not advance		
Bruce Heidt	Mixed 10m air rifle standing SH2	591	14	did not advance		
Mike Larochelle	Mixed 10m air rifle prone SH2	597	12	did not advance		
Mike Larochelle	Mixed 10m air rifle standing SH2	591	15	did not advance		
Glenn Mariash	Mixed 10m air rifle prone SH1	593	38	did not advance		
Glenn Mariash	Mixed 50m rifle three positions	1110	16	did not advance		
Chris Trifonidis	Mixed 10m air rifle prone SH1	596	22	did not advance		
Chris Trifonidis	Mixed 10m air rifle standing SH2	580	22	did not advance		
Chris Trifonidis	Mixed 50m rifle prone	587	6 Q	102.8	689.8	6

==== Women ====
Athlete	Event	Qualification		Final		
Athlete	Event	Score	Rank	Score	Total	Rank
Karen van Nest	Women's 10m air pistol SH1	360	7	91.6	451.6	5
Karen van Nest	Mixed 25m air pistol SH1	540	17	did not advance		

=== Swimming ===
==== Men ====
Athlete	Class	Event	Heats		Final	
Athlete	Class	Event	Result	Rank	Result	Rank
Tyler Emmett	S13	50m freestyle	27.30	8 Q	27.20	8
Tyler Emmett	S13	100m freestyle	1:00.86	11	did not advance	
Tyler Emmett	SB13	100m breaststroke	1:18.54	9	did not advance	
Tyler Emmett	SM13	200m individual medley	2:32.67	5 Q	2:29.20	4
Andrew Haley	S9	400m freestyle	4:41.56	11	did not advance	
Andrew Haley	S9	100m backstroke	1:10.41	9	did not advance	
Andrew Haley	S9	100m butterfly	1:05.35	4 Q	1:06.41	7
Andrew Haley	SM9	200m individual medley	2:32.64	9	did not advance	
Brian Hill	S13	50m freestyle	28.09	14	did not advance	
Brian Hill	S13	100m freestyle	59.45	5 Q	59.32	5
Brian Hill	S13	400m freestyle	4:46.74	4 Q	4:39.52	3rd place, bronze medalist(s)
Brian Hill	S13	100m backstroke	1:07.10	2 Q	1:06.97	3rd place, bronze medalist(s)
Brian Hill	S13	100m butterfly	1:04.93	6 Q	1:03.90	4
Brian Hill	SM13	200m individual medley	2:30.81	3 Q	2:31.07	5
Benoît Huot	S10	50m freestyle	25.32	1 Q	24.71 WR	1st place, gold medalist(s)
Benoît Huot	S10	100m freestyle	55.28	1 Q	53.73 WR	1st place, gold medalist(s)
Benoît Huot	S10	400m freestyle	4:28.03	2 Q	4:15.01	1st place, gold medalist(s)
Benoît Huot	S10	100m backstroke	1:07.70	2 Q	1:04.30	2nd place, silver medalist(s)
Benoît Huot	S10	100m butterfly	1:00.92	2 Q	59.54 WR	1st place, gold medalist(s)
Benoît Huot	SB9	100m breaststroke	1:15.17	7 Q	1:14.48	6
Benoît Huot	SM9	200m individual medley|	2:24.44	1 Q	2:15.78	1st place, gold medalist(s)
Adam Purdy	S6	100m backstroke	1:19.92	4 Q	1:18.97	4
Adam Purdy	SM6	200m individual medley	3:12.26	10	did not advance	
Brad Sales	S9	100m freestyle	1:02.27	14	did not advance	
Brad Sales	S9	400m freestyle	4:36.64	4 Q	4:34.16	5
Brad Sales	S9	100m backstroke	1:08.29	4 Q	1:08.15	5
Donovan Tildesley	S11	50m freestyle	28.27	4 Q	27.76	4
Donovan Tildesley	S11	100m freestyle	1:02.32	1 Q	1:00.95	3rd place, bronze medalist(s)
Donovan Tildesley	S11	400m freestyle	4:53.60	1 Q	4:49.68	2nd place, silver medalist(s)
Donovan Tildesley	S11	100m backstroke	1:14.67	3 Q	1:12.84	4
Donovan Tildesley	S11	100m butterfly	1:15.82	3 Q	1:12.69	4
Donovan Tildesley	SM11	200m individual medley	N/A		2:36.32	2nd place, silver medalist(s)
Walter Wu	S13	400m freestyle	4:47.79	7 Q	4:28.84	1st place, gold medalist(s)
Walter Wu	S13	100m backstroke	1:09.46	5 Q	1:06.57	2nd place, silver medalist(s)
Walter Wu	S13	100m butterfly	1:03.62	3 Q	1:03.90	4
Walter Wu	SM13	200m individual medley	2:28.46	1 Q	2:25.81	2nd place, silver medalist(s)
Benoît Huot; Adam Purdy; Brad Sales; Andrew Haley	N/A	4 x 100m (34 pts) freestyle relay	4:21.64	7 Q	4:16.86	7
Benoît Huot; Adam Purdy; Brad Sales; Andrew Haley	N/A	4 x 100m (34 pts)) medley relay	4:46.85	8 Q	4:41.98	8

==== Women ====
Athlete	Class	Event	Heats		Final	
Athlete	Class	Event	Result	Rank	Result	Rank
Danielle Campo	S7	50m freestyle	36.07	4 Q	35.17	3rd place, bronze medalist(s)
Danielle Campo	S7	100m freestyle	1:18.51	5 Q	1:15.97	4
Danielle Campo	S7	400m freestyle	5:52.62	4 Q	5:39.13	3rd place, bronze medalist(s)
Danielle Campo	S7	50m butterfly	48.56	11	did not advance	
Andrea Cole	S8	50m freestyle	35.57	10	did not advance	
Andrea Cole	S8	100m freestyle	1:18.25	10	did not advance	
Andrea Cole	S8	400m freestyle	5:43.92	7 Q	5:44.29	8
Andrea Cole	S8	100m butterfly	1:26.12	4 Q	1:24.78	3rd place, bronze medalist(s)
Andrea Cole	SM8	200m individual medley	3:08.70	5 Q	3:09.92	6
Kirby Cote	S13	50m freestyle	29.11	1 Q	28.47	1st place, gold medalist(s)
Kirby Cote	S13	100m freestyle	1:03.34	1 Q	1:01.74	1st place, gold medalist(s)
Kirby Cote	S13	400m freestyle	N/A		4:43.23	1st place, gold medalist(s)
Kirby Cote	S13	100m backstroke	1:15.65	2 Q	1:14.08	2nd place, silver medalist(s)
Kirby Cote	S13	100m butterfly	N/A		1:07.44	1st place, gold medalist(s)
Kirby Cote	SB13	100m breaststroke	N/A		1:17.34	2nd place, silver medalist(s)
Kirby Cote	SM13	200m individual medley	N/A		2:31.20	1st place, gold medalist(s)
Stephanie Dixon	S9	50m freestyle	32.28	8 Q	30.66	3rd place, bronze medalist(s)
Stephanie Dixon	S9	100m freestyle	1:09.26	5 Q	1:05.31	2nd place, silver medalist(s)
Stephanie Dixon	S9	400m freestyle	5:11.57	3 Q	4:46.57	2nd place, silver medalist(s)
Stephanie Dixon	S9	100m backstroke	1:14.71	2 Q	1:10.01 WR	1st place, gold medalist(s)
Stephanie Dixon	S9	100m butterfly	1:13.81	2 Q	1:12.01	2nd place, silver medalist(s)
Stephanie Dixon	SM9	200m individual medley	2:47.78	2 Q	2:41.84	2nd place, silver medalist(s)
Darda Geiger	S9	100m freestyle	1:09.43	7 Q	1:10.39	8
Darda Geiger	S9	400m freestyle	5:12.89	5 Q	5:09.54	5
Darda Geiger	S9	100m backstroke	1:23.81	12	did not advance	
Chelsey Gotell	S13	50m freestyle	29.56	3 Q	29.00	3rd place, bronze medalist(s)
Chelsey Gotell	S13	100m freestyle	1:04.61	4 Q	1:03.69	3rd place, bronze medalist(s)
Chelsey Gotell	S13	400m freestyle	N/A		4:58.63	4
Chelsey Gotell	S13	100m backstroke	1:14.53	1 Q	1:12.71	1st place, gold medalist(s)
Chelsey Gotell	S13	100m butterfly	N/A		1:11.05	5
Chelsey Gotell	SB13	100m breaststroke	N/A		1:25.84	4
Chelsey Gotell	SM13	200m individual medley	N/A		2:34.97	3rd place, bronze medalist(s)
Kaley McLean	S5	200m freestyle	3:41.06	6 Q	3:44.21	7
Kaley McLean	S5	50m backstroke	1:03.70	9	did not advance	
Kaley McLean	S5	50m butterfly	N/A		1:05.25	8
Anne Polinario	S10	50m freestyle	29.07	1 Q	28.75	1st place, gold medalist(s)
Anne Polinario	S10	100m freestyle	1:03.64	1 Q	1:03.65	1st place, gold medalist(s)
Anne Polinario	S10	100m backstroke	N/A		1:15.67	2nd place, silver medalist(s)
Anne Polinario	SM10	200m individual medley	2:48.12	5 Q	2:45.66	4
Rhea Schmidt	S13	50m freestyle	30.66	9	did not advance	
Rhea Schmidt	S13	100m freestyle	1:06.57	7 Q	1:05.48	6
Rhea Schmidt	S13	100m backstroke	1:19.89	6 Q	1:17.51	5
Rhea Schmidt	SB13	100m breaststroke	N/A		1:26.53	5
Rhea Schmidt	SM13	200m individual medley	N/A		2:42.62	5
Jessica Tuomela	S11	50m freestyle	35.50	8 Q	33.68	4
Jessica Tuomela	S11	100m freestyle	1:18.27	4 Q	1:13.25	2nd place, silver medalist(s)
Jessica Tuomela	S11	100m backstroke	1:33.64	7 Q	1:28.55	6
Jessica Tuomela	SB11	100m breaststroke	DSQ		did not advance	
Elisabeth Walker	S7	400m freestyle	6:24.38	9	did not advance	
Elisabeth Walker	S7	100m backstroke	1:35.23	6 Q	1:35.16	7
Elisabeth Walker	S7	50m butterfly	38.71	2 Q	38.30	3rd place, bronze medalist(s)
Elisabeth Walker	S7	100m butterfly	1:33.52	11	did not advance	
Elisabeth Walker	SM7	200m individual medley	3:27.51	5 Q	3:21.87	6
Stephanie Dixon; Andrea Cole; Danielle Campo; Anne Polinario	N/A	4x100m (34pts) freestyle relays	N/A		4:41.70	2nd place, silver medalist(s)
Darda Geiger; Elisabeth Walker; Anne Polinario; Stephanie Dixon	N/A	4x100m (34pts) medley relays	N/A		5:18.57	2nd place, silver medalist(s)

=== Wheelchair basketball ===
==== Men's team ====
The team consisted of 12 basketball players.

- Patrick Anderson
- Jaimie Borisoff
- Brad Bowden
- David Durepos
- David Eng
- Travis Gaertner
- Roy Henderson
- Joey Johnson
- Adam Lancia
- Ross Norton
- Richard Peter
- Chris Stoutenburg

Game	Match	Score	Rank
1	Canada vs. Australia (AUS)	66 - 38	Group A 1 Q
2	Canada vs. Great Britain (GBR)	63 - 45	Group A 1 Q
3	Canada vs. Italy (ITA)	83 - 54	Group A 1 Q
4	Canada vs. Brazil (BRA)	78 - 55	Group A 1 Q
5	Canada vs. Ukraine (UKR)	63 - 43	Group A 1 Q
Quarter finals	Canada vs. Japan (JPN)	50 - 48	W
Semi finals	Canada vs. Netherlands (NED)	91 - 70	W
Gold medal final	Canada vs. Australia (AUS)	70 - 53	1st place, gold medalist(s)

==== Women's team ====
The team consisted of 12 basketball players.

- Marni Abbott-Peter
- Chantal Benoit
- Tracey Ferguson
- Shira Golden
- Jennifer Krempien
- Linda Kutrowski
- Arley McNeney
- Kendra Ohama
- Danielle Peers
- Sabrina Pettinicchi
- Lori Radke
- Karla Tritten

Game	Match	Score	Rank
1	Canada vs. Germany (GER)	59 - 46	Group B 1 Q
2	Canada vs. Japan (JPN)	51 - 28	Group B 1 Q
3	Canada vs. Mexico (MEX)	63 - 34	Group B 1 Q
Quarter finals	Canada vs. Netherlands (NED)	65 - 46	W
Semi finals	Canada vs. United States (USA)	40 - 57	L
Bronze medal final	Canada vs. Germany (GER)	63 - 47	3rd place, bronze medalist(s)

=== Wheelchair rugby ===
Date	Match	Teams	Final score
Pool play
September 19	2	CAN vs. GER	33 - 30 (OT)
September 20	6	CAN vs. GBR	30 - 32 (OT)
September 21	10	CAN vs. BEL	33 - 29
Final round play
September 23	16	CAN vs. AUS	36 - 33
September 24	19*	USA vs. CAN	20 - 24
September 25	24**	NZL vs. CAN	31 - 29

- * Semi-final game
- ** Gold medal final

=== Wheelchair tennis ===
Athlete	Class	Event	Round of 32	Round or 16	Quarterfinals	Semifinals	Finals
Athlete	Class	Event	Opposition Result	Opposition Result	Opposition Result	Opposition Result	Opposition Result
Sarah Hunter	Open	Quad's singles	—N/a	Toma (JPN); W 6-1, 6-2	Norfolk (GBR); L 3-6, 5-7	did not advance	
Brian McPhate	Open	Quad's singles	—N/a	de Beer (NED); L 1-6, 2-6	did not advance		
Yuka Chokyu	Open	Women's singles	Courtier (NZL); W 6-1, 7-5	Di Toro (AUS); L 1-6, 3-6	did not advance		
Helene Simard	Open	Women's singles	Khanthasit (THA); L 3-6, 4-6	did not advance			
Sarah Hunter; Brian McPhate	Open	Quad's doubles	—N/a		Takashima (JPN); Toma (JPN); W 6-3, 6-0	Taylor (USA); Wagner (USA); L 0-6, 3-6	de Beer (NED) van Erp (NED); L 3-6, 1-6
Yuka Chokyu; Helene Simard	Open	Women's doubles	Khanthasit (THA); Techamaneewat (THA); L 1-6, 1-6	did not advance			

== See also ==
- Canada at the 2004 Summer Olympics
- Canada at the Paralympics
