= Wheelchair basketball at the 2012 Summer Paralympics – Women's team rosters =

Paralympics in London, England

This is a list of players that participated in the women's wheelchair basketball competition at the 2012 Summer Paralympics in London, England.

== Group A ==
=== Australia ===
The following is the Australia roster in the women's wheelchair basketball tournament of the 2012 Summer Paralympics.

Australia women's national wheelchair basketball team – 2012 Summer Paralympics roster
Players
Coaches

No.	Name	Age – Date of birth	Pts.	Club	Ctr.
4	Sarah Vinci	20 – 4 December 1991		Western Stars	(Australia)
5	Cobi Crispin	23 – 22 December 1988		Vic Dandenong Rangers	(Australia)
6	Bridie Kean	25 – 27 February 1987		Minecraft Comets	(Australia)
7	Amanda Carter	48 – 16 July 1964		Vic Dandenong Rangers	(Australia)
8	Tina Mckenzie	38 – 8 June 1974		Stacks Goudkamp Bears	(Australia)
9	Leanne Del Toso	32 – 12 August 1980		Vic Dandenong Rangers	(Australia)
10	Clare Nott	26 – 11 August 1986		Western Stars	(Australia)
11	Kylie Gauci	27 – 1 January 1985		Stacks Goudkamp Bears	(Australia)
12	Shelley Chaplin	27 – 4 September 1984		Vic Dandenong Rangers	(Australia)
13	Sarah Stewart	36 – 13 June 1976		Sydney Uni Flames	(Australia)
14	Katie Hill	28 – 17 February 1984		Sydney Uni Flames	(Australia)
15	Amber Merritt	19 – 17 February 1993		Western Stars	(Australia)

Head coach

- (Australia) John Triscari

Assistant coach(es)

- (Australia) David Gould
- (Australia) Ben Osborne

Legend

- Club – describes last
  club before the tournament
- Age – describes age
  on 30 August 2012

=== Canada ===
The following is the Canada roster in the women's wheelchair basketball tournament of the 2012 Summer Paralympics.

Canada women's national wheelchair basketball team-2012 Summer Paralympics roster
Players
Coaches

No.	Name	Age – Date of birth	Pts.	Club	Ctr.
4	Elaine Allard	35 – 25 February 1977	1.5	Gladiateurs de Larval	(Canada)
5	Janet McLachlan	35 – 26 August 1977	4.5	BC Breakers	(Canada)
6	Kendra Ohama	47 – 1 June 1965	2.5	Trier Dolphins	(Germany)
7	Cindy Ouellet	23 – 8 December 1988	3.5	University of Alabama	(United States)
8	Tamara Steeves	22 – 23 September 1989	1.5	Brampton Cruisers	(Canada)
9	Maude Jacques	20 – 21 April 1992	2.5	University of Alabama	(United States)
10	Katie Harnock	29 – 12 August 1983	2.0	University of Alabama	(United States)
11	Elisha Williams	34 – 9 June 1978	4.5	BC Breakers	(Canada)
12	Tracey Ferguson	37 – 7 September 1974	3.0	Variety Village Club	(Canada)
13	Jamey Jewells	23 – 23 August 1989	1.0	Trier Dolphins	(Germany)
14	Jessica Vliegenthart	29 – 11 August 1983	1.0	BC Breakers	(Canada)
15	Tara Feser	32 – 2 February 1980	4.5	Edmonton Inferno	(Canada)

Head coach

- Bill Johnson

Assistant coach(es)

- Marni Abbott-Peter
- Michael Broughton
- Karla Tritten
- Tim Frick
- Danielle Peers

=== Great Britain ===
The following is the Great Britain roster in the women's wheelchair basketball tournament of the 2012 Summer Paralympics.

Great Britain women's national wheelchair basketball team – 2012 Summer Paralympics roster
Players
Coaches

No.	Name	Age – Date of birth	Pts.	Club	Ctr.
4	Caroline Maclean	37 – 19 April 1975		Essex Outlaws	(United Kingdom)
5	Sarah Grady	28 – 25 April 1984
6	Clare Strange	32 – 18 September 1979		Milton Keynes Aces	(United Kingdom)
7	Helen Freeman	22 – 23 November 1989		UIC Flames	(United States)
8	Laurie Williams	20 – 4 February 1992		Nottingham Coyotes	(United Kingdom)
9	Judith Hamer	21 – 3 December 1990
10	Amy Conroy	19 – 22 October 1992		Aylesbury Aces	(United Kingdom)
11	Maddie Thompson	17 – 29 March 1995		Nottingham Coyotes	(United Kingdom)
12	Helen Turner	34 – 15 October 1977		Aspire Force Wheelchair Basketball Club	(United Kingdom)
13	Louise Sugden	28 – 20 July 1984		Aylesbury Aces	(United Kingdom)
14	Natasha Davies	21 – 6 December 1990		Loughborough University	(United Kingdom)
15	Sarah Mcphee	32 – 13 February 1980		Tameside Owls	(United Kingdom)

Head coach

- (United Kingdom) Garry Peel

Legend

- Club – describes last
  club before the tournament
- Age – describes age
  on 30 August 2012
