= Wheelchair basketball at the 2004 Summer Paralympics =

Wheelchair basketball at the XII Paralympic Games
- Paralympic Wheelchair Basketball
- Venue: Olympic Indoor Hall
- Dates: 18–28 September 2004

Medalists
1st place, gold medalist(s)		Canada (CAN) (men); United States (USA) (women)
2nd place, silver medalist(s)		Australia (AUS) (men); Australia (AUS) (women)
3rd place, bronze medalist(s)		Great Britain (GBR) (men); Canada (CAN) (women)

Wheelchair Basketball at the 2004 Summer Paralympics was staged in the Olympic Indoor Hall from September 18 to September 28.

== Medalists ==
Event	Gold	Silver	Bronze
Men's team	Canada (CAN)	Australia (AUS)	Great Britain (GBR)
Women's team	United States (USA)	Australia (AUS)	Canada (CAN)

Source: Paralympic.org

== Classification ==
Classification is an important element that will ensure athletes can compete in a fair situation.

A certain committee will give athletes who can take part in this sport an eight-level-score specific to basketball, ranging from 1 to 4.5. Lower scores represent a larger disability. The sum score of all players on the court cannot exceed 14.

== Teams ==
=== Men's ===
Canada; David Durepos; David Eng; Travis Gaertner; Chris Stoutenburg; Patrick Anderson; Jaimie Borisoff; Adam Lancia; Ross Norton; Joey Johnson; Richard Peter; Roy Henderson; Brad Bowden	Australia; David Selby; Grant Mizens; Campbell Message; Brendan Dowler; Brad Ness; Adrian King; Daryl Taylor; Andrew Flavel; Shaun Norris; Tristan Knowles; Troy Sachs; Justin Eveson	Italy; Alberto Pellegrini; Matteo Cavagnini; Fabio Bernardis; Emiliano Rocca; Mauro Pennino; Ali Mohamed Sanna; Sandr Cherubini; Damiano Airoldi; Salvatore Cherchi; Sergio Cherubini; Stefano Rossetti; Fabio Raimondi	Great Britain; Matt Byrne; Andrew Blake; Peter Finbow; Colin Price; Stuart Jellows; Ade Adepitan; Jonathan Pollock; Simon Munn; Terry Bywater; Kevin Hayes; Fred Howley; Sinclair Thomas
Brazil; Nilton Pessoa; Carlos da Silva Júnior; Thiago Oliveira; Marcos Silva; Alex Alves; Paulo dos Santos; Sandoval Silva; Irio Nunes; Glebe Silva; Erick Silva; Heriberto Rocca; Wandemberg Nascimento	France; Jose Therezo; Manuel Vaisioa; Roger Deda; Philippe Baye; Bertrand Libman; Frederic Guyot; Mario Fahrasmane; Ouahid Boustila; Jerome Courneil; Abou Konate; Audrey Cayol; Riadh Sallem	United States; Gavin Cloy; Jason Nelms; Jeremy Lade; Lawrence Johnson; Jeffrey James Glasbrenner; Jeffrey Griffin; Matt Scott; Jeff Dills; Mike Paye; Juan Angulo; Jermell Pennie; Josh Turek	Netherlands; Wim 't Lam; Koen Jansens; Mete Oztegel; Frans van Breugel; Kornelis van der Werf; Gert Jan van der Linden; Frank de Goede; Peter Brandsen; Mustafa Charif Jebari; Anton de Rooy; Ruud Dettmer; Mario Oosterbosch
Germany; Martin Otto; Dirk Thalheim; Lars Christink; Sebastian Hagen Wolf; Abdulqazi Karaman; Joachim Peter Schermuly; Lars Lehmann; Joerg Hilger; Thomas Fischer; Ben Doering; Markus Haberkorn; Ralf Schwarz	Japan; Shingo Fujii; Kazuyuki Kyoya; Reo Fujimoto; Tomohiko Oshima; Takao Sugasawa; Yasuhiro Jimbo; Naoki Yasu; Keisuke Koretomo; Hisanobu Sugiura; Katsumi Miyake; Noriyuki Mori; Yasuyuki Hasegawa	Iran; Gholamreza Nami; Morteza Gharibloo; Bahman Seifi; Ebrahim Taghiloo; Adel Torfi Manshadi; Mohammadreza Karimi; Seyed Abolfazi Mousavi; Majid Mokhtari; Zakariya Hesamy Zadeh; Alireza Danesh; Alireza Ahmadi; Ahmad Daghaghele Pour	Greece; Michalis Chatzidimitriou; Vaios Gioras; Georgios Echlert; Panagiotis Chrisovergis; Angelos Tsiakiris; Georgios Kounias; Michalis Stergiopoulos; Nikolaos Loulas; Athanasios Maltas; Georgios Petrakis; Angelos Dimpitouzis; Periklis Tsapanidis

=== Women's ===
Australia; Melanie Domaschenz; Jane Sachs; Paula Coghlan; Sarah Stewart; Shelley Chaplin; Kylie Gauci; Melinda Young; Liesl Tesch; Tina Mckenzie; Karen Farrell; Lisa Chaffey; Alison Mosely	United States; Susan Katz; Christina Ripp; Renee Tyree; Janna Crawford; Carlee Hoffman; Stephanie Wheeler; Teresa Lannon; Jennifer Howitt; Jennifer Warkins; Emily Hoskins; Patricia Cisneros; Jana Stump	Great Britain; Jill Fox; Helen Turner; Sonia Howe; Kristina Small; Caroline Matthews; Sally Wager; Wendy Smith; Ann Wild; Jenny Dalgleish; Clare Strange; Sarah Burrett; Caroline McLean	Netherlands; Cher Korver; Miranda Wevers; Jeanine van Veggel; Carina Versloot; Evelyn van Leeuwen; Jozima Mosely; Petra Garnier; Fleur Pieterse; Roos Oosterbaan; Asjousja Ibrahimi; Ingeborg Tiggelman; Jennette Jansen
Canada; Sabrina Pettinicchi; Tracey Ferguson; Lori Radke; Linda Kutrowski; Danielle Peers; Shira Golden; Chantal Benoit; Arley McNeney; Karla Tritten; Kendra Ohama; Marni Abbott; Jennifer Krempien	Germany; Nora Schratz; Maren Bartlitz; Silke Bleifuss; Annette Kahl; Inga Orlowski; Birgit Meitner; Nu Nguyen Thi; Annika Zeyen; Heidi Kriste; Simone Kues; Anja Janusch; Verena Klein	Japan; Rie Kawakami; Megumi Mashiko; Naoko Sugahara; Tomoe Soeda; Sachiko Minamikawa; Erika Yoshida; Mika Takabayashi; Kyoko Tsukamoto; Yasuko Hatano; Chika Uemura; Junko Sako; Sachiko Goto	Mexico; Rosa Elizabeth Vera Gallardo; Rubicela Guzman Acosta; Lupita Madrigal Cruz; Yolanda Calderon Duran; Rosa Elizabeth Camara Arango; Lucia Vazquez Delgadillo; Leticia Penaloza Serrano; Maria Montano Mejia; Rocio Dolores Torres Lopez; Romy Rodriguez Velazquez; Cecilia Vazquez Suarez; Wendy Garcia Amador

== Competition format ==
Teams consisted of twelve players, of whom five were on court at any one time. Each player was rated between 0.5 and 4.5 points based on the extent of their disability, with 4.5 representing the least physical limitation. The sum of the rates of all players on court at any time was limited to 14.5 points per team.

As their Olympic Counterpart, the Games were played in four periods of ten minutes, with extra time periods of five minutes added as necessary to resolve a tied game.

== See also ==
- Basketball at the 2004 Summer Olympics
