= Katie Hill (basketball) =

Australian wheelchair basketball player

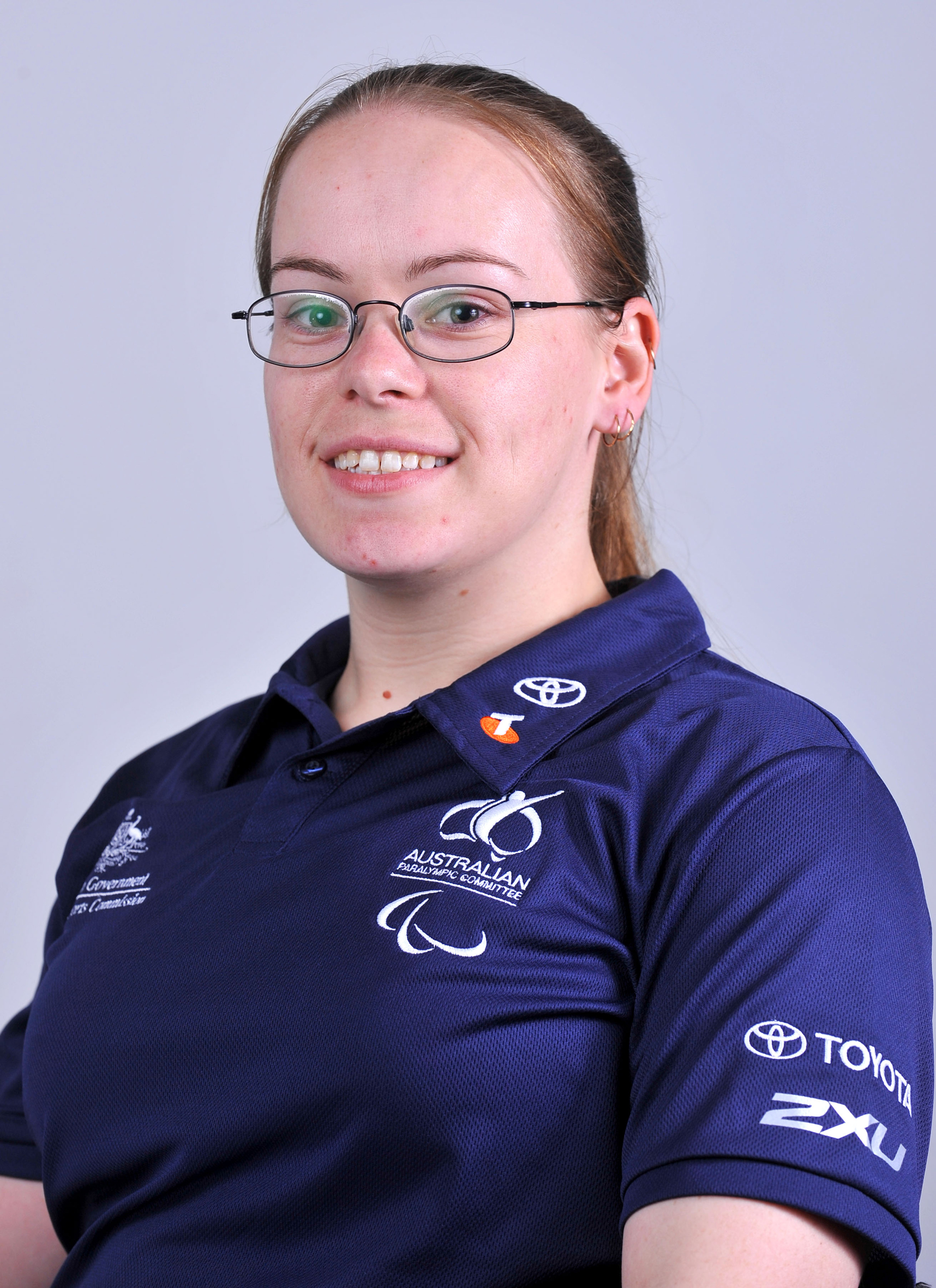
- 2012 Australian Paralympic team portrait of Hill

Personal information
- Born: 17 February 1984 (age 42) Kogarah, New South Wales, Australia

Sport
- Country: Australia
- Sport: Wheelchair basketball
- Disability class: 3.0
- Event: Women's team
- Club: Sydney University Flames
Medal record
Wheelchair basketball
Paralympic Games
Bronze medal – third place	2008 Beijing	Women's wheelchair basketball
Silver medal – second place	2012 London	Women's Wheelchair basketball

Katie Hill (born 17 February 1984) is an Australian 3.0 point wheelchair basketball player. She participated in the 2008 Summer Paralympics in Beijing, where she won a bronze medal, and the 2012 Summer Paralympics in London, where she won a silver medal. She has over 100 international caps playing for Australia.

Hill plays for the Sydney University Flames in the Australian Women's National Wheelchair Basketball League (WNWBL). As the Hills Hornets, her team won the league championship in 2007, 2008 and 2009. After changing their name to the Sydney University Flames, they again won the WNWBL championship in 2010. She was named 4 point Most Valuable Player (MVP) and a member of the All Star Five in 2007. In 2009, she scored 21 points in the Hornets' 66–49 final win against the Perth Western Stars, and was named MVP of the finals series.

Hill made her national team debut in 2005 in Malaysia at the World Junior Wheelchair Basketball Championships, and has played for the Australia women's national wheelchair basketball team, universally known as the Gliders, at the IWBF World Wheelchair Basketball Championships in Amsterdam in 2006 and Birmingham in 2010, and at the 2007, 2009 and 2010 Osaka Cups in Japan.

== Personal life ==
Katie Hill was born in Kogarah, New South Wales, on 17 February 1984, the youngest of three children. She has spina bifida, a condition she has had since birth. As of 2013, she lives in Panania, New South Wales, and works as a receptionist at Salesforce.com.

== Wheelchair basketball ==
Hill is a 3.0 point player, who started playing wheelchair basketball in 1996. In financial year 2012/13, the Australian Sports Commission gave her a A$20,000 grant as part of their Direct Athlete Support (DAS) program. She received $11,000 in 2011/12, $17,000 in 2010/11, $5,571.42 in 2009/10 and $5,200 in 2008/09. In 2012 and 2013, she had a scholarship with the New South Wales Institute of Sport.

=== Club ===
Hill currently plays club wheelchair basketball for the Sydney University Flames in the Australian Women's National Wheelchair Basketball League (WNWBL), and the Sydney University Wheelkings in the mixed National Wheelchair basketball League. Playing with the Hills Hornets, who won the league championship, she was named 4 point Most Valuable Player (MVP) and part of the All Star Five in 2007. In the 2009 finals series, she scored 20 points in the semi-final to get the Hills Hornets into the final, and then 21 points and 7 assists in the Hornets won 66–49 final win against the Perth Western Stars. She was named MVP of the finals series. In all, the Hornets won eight straight championships from 2002 to 2009, before changing their name to the Sydney University Flames in 2010, and claiming a ninth title that year.

=== National team ===
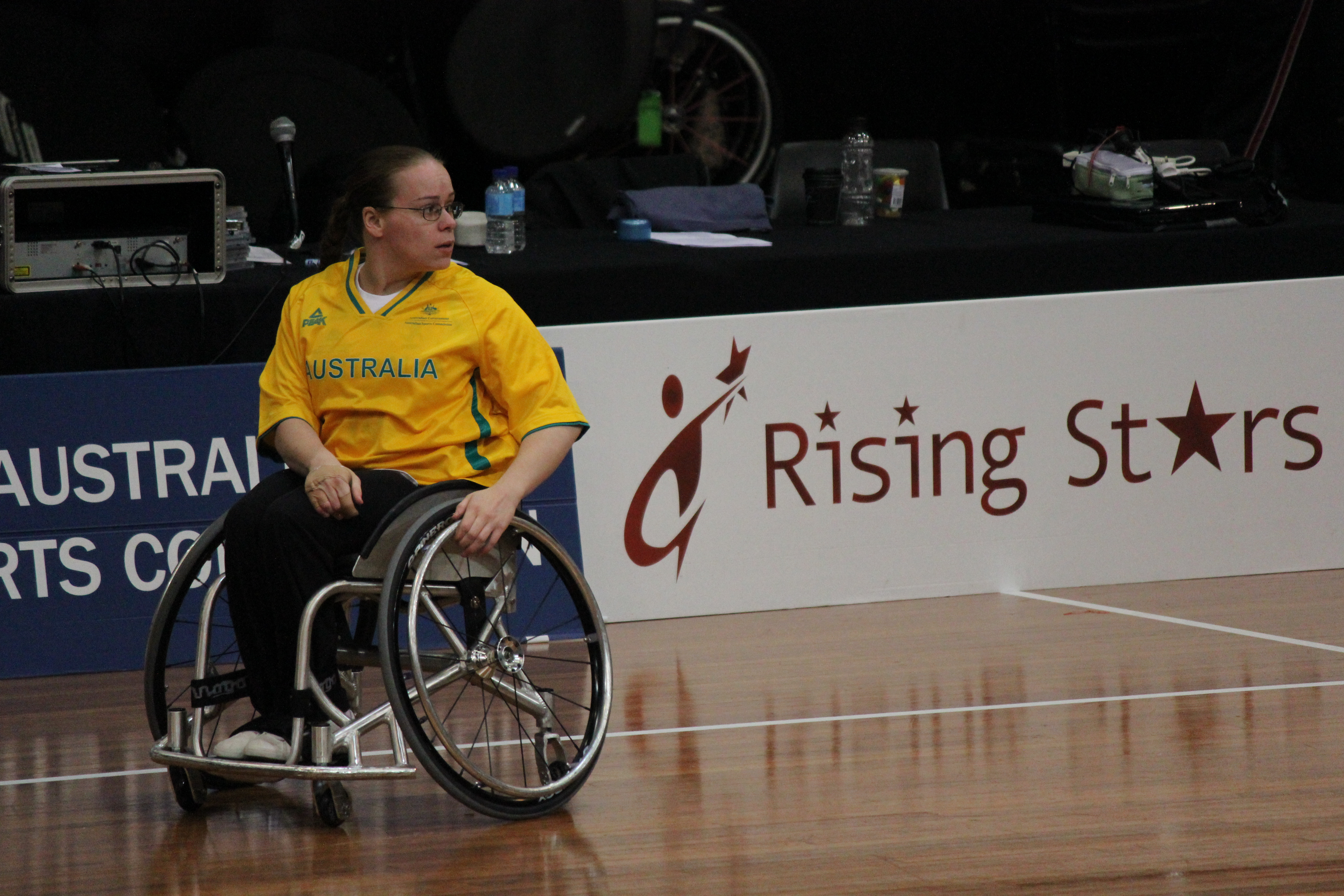
Hill at a game in 2012 in Sydney

Hill made her national team debut in 2005 in Malaysia at the World Junior Wheelchair Basketball Championships. She played for the Australia women's national wheelchair basketball team, universally known as the Gliders, at the IWBF World Wheelchair Basketball Championship in Amsterdam in the Netherlands in 2006, where the Gliders came fourth, at the 2007 Asia Oceania Qualification tournament, and at the 2007 and 2009 Osaka Cup in Japan. She subsequently represented Australia at the 2010 World Championships in Birmingham, where the Gliders again finished fourth, and was a member of the 2010 team that played in the Osaka Cup. By August 2012, she had played 110 international games.

=== Paralympics ===
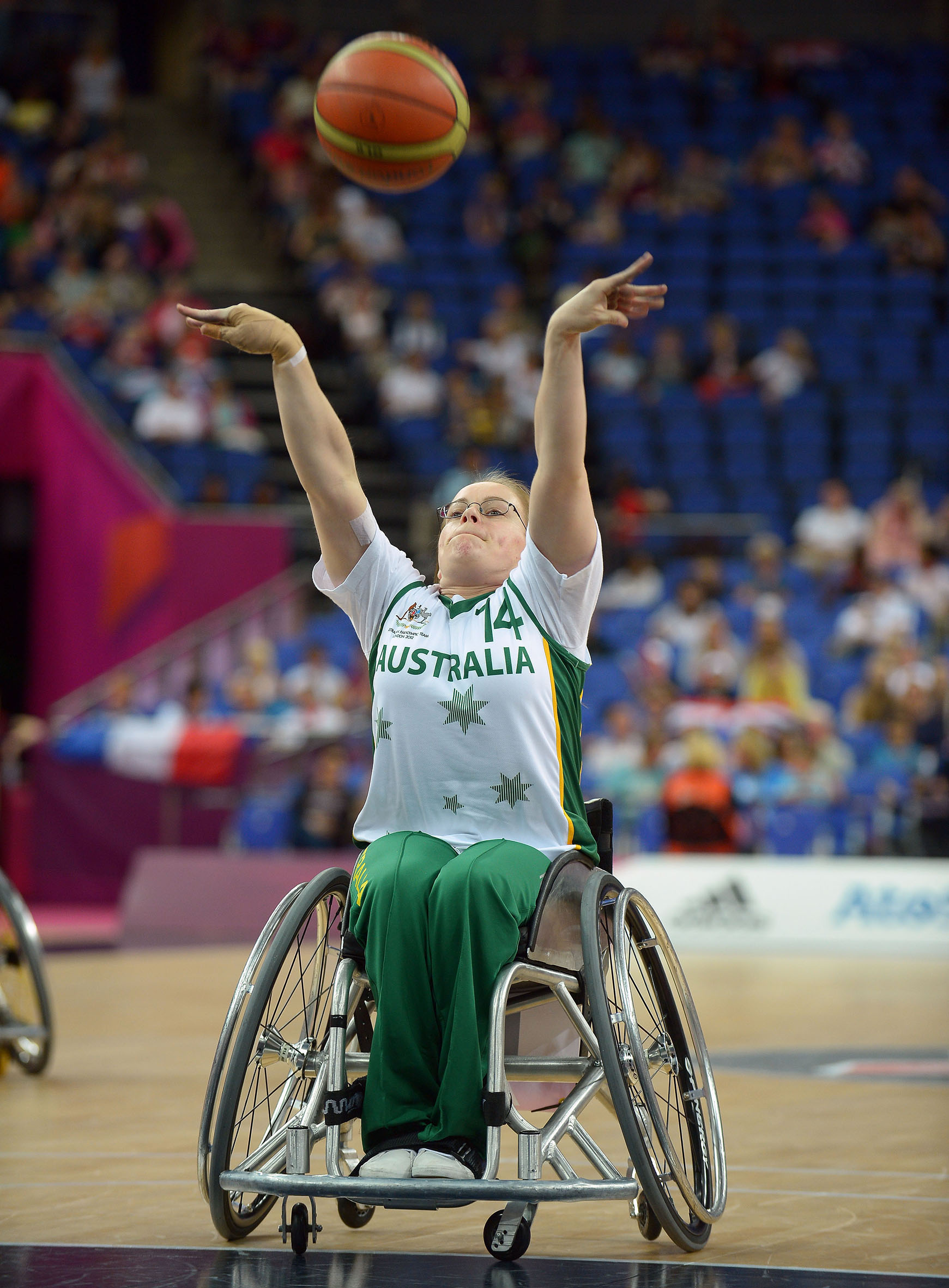
Hill at the 2012 London Paralympics

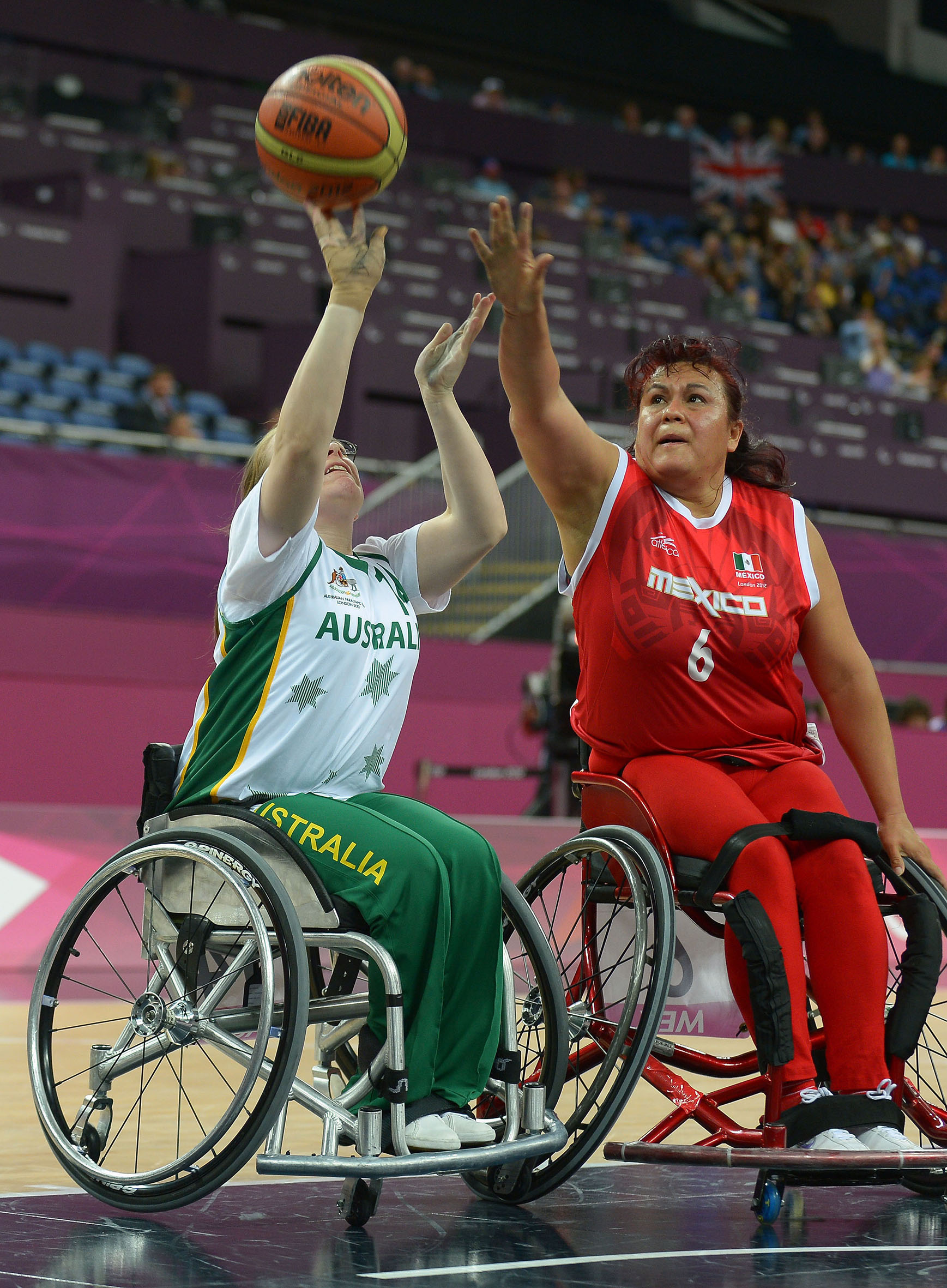
Hill at the 2012 London Paralympics

Hill was part of the bronze medal-winning team at the 2008 Summer Paralympics in Beijing, and again at the 2012 Summer Paralympics in London. The Australia women's national wheelchair basketball team at the 2012 Summer Paralympics posted wins in the group stage against Brazil, Great Britain, and the Netherlands, but lost to the Canada. This was enough to advance the Gliders to the quarter-finals, where they beat Mexico. The Gliders then defeated the United States by a point to set up a final clash with Germany. The Gliders lost 44–58, and earned a silver medal. Hill played in all seven games, for a total of 107 minutes, scoring 25 points, with six assists and eight rebounds.

== Statistics ==
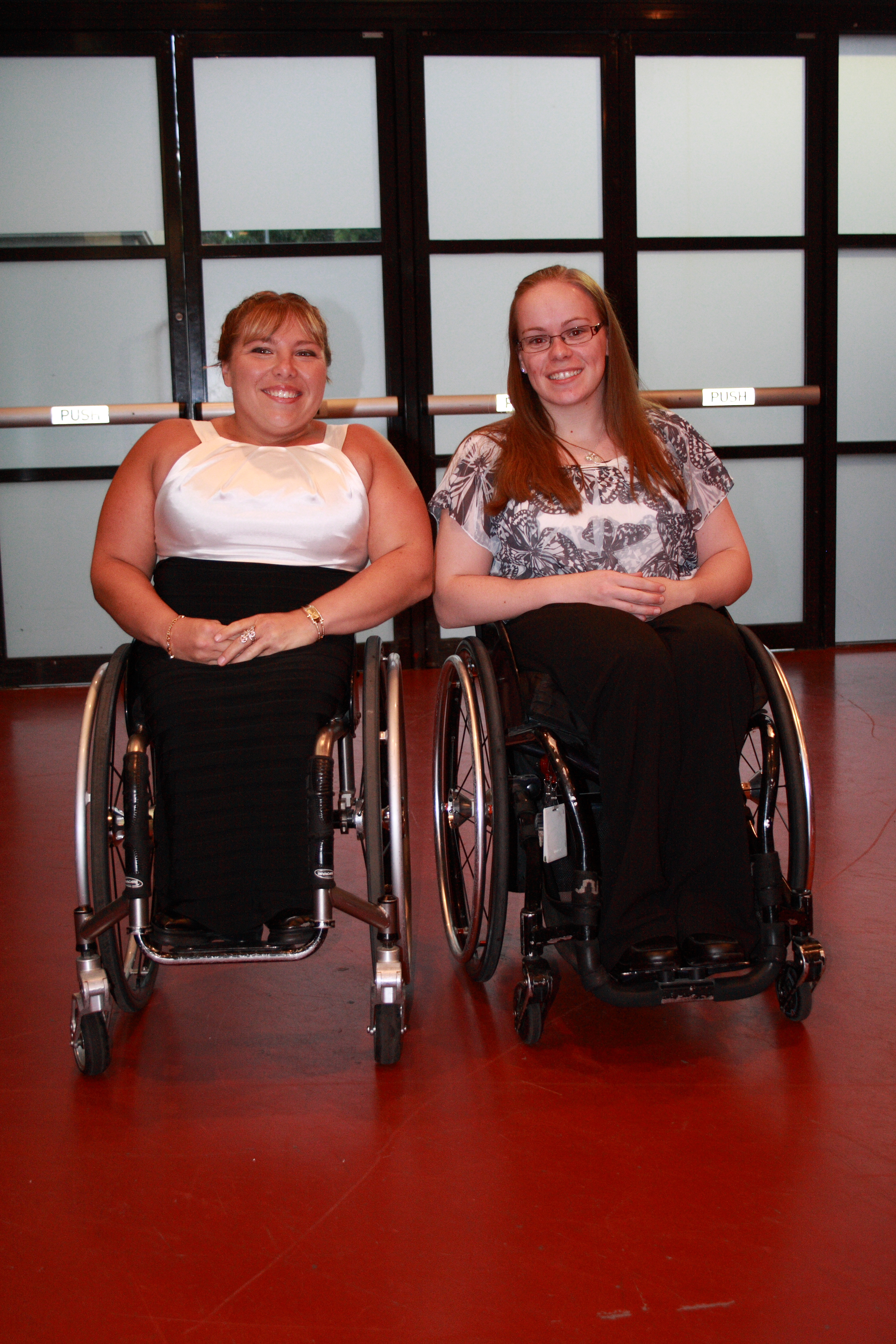
Katie Hill (right) with teammate Kylie Gauci at the Australian Paralympian of the Year 2012 ceremony at the Hordern Pavilion, Sydney, Australia

Season statistics
Competition	Season	Matches	FGM–FGA	FG%	3FGM–3FGA	3FG%	FTM–FTA	FT%	PF	Pts	TOT	AST	PTS
WNWBL	2009	15	81–215	37.7	5–25	20.0	8–29	27.6	175	260	3.3	4.3	11.7
WNWBL	2010	18	104–261	39.8	2–15	13.3	8–18	44.4	218	250	4.0	6.1	12.1
WNWBL	2011	6	11–20	55.0	—	0.0	—	0.0	3	22	1.3	2.2	3.7
WNWBL	2012	14	69–193	35.8	2–17	11.8	7–20	35.0	37	147	2.6	3.5	10.5
WNWBL	2013	11	51–137	37.2	0–3	0.0	0–2	0.0	14	102	3.2	2.8	9.3

Key
FGM, FGA, FG%: field goals made, attempted and percentage
3FGM, 3FGA, 3FG%: three-point field goals made, attempted and percentage
FTM, FTA, FT%: free throws made, attempted and percentage
PF: personal fouls
Pts, PTS: points, average per game
TOT: turnovers average per game
AST: assists average per game
