= Brad Bowden =

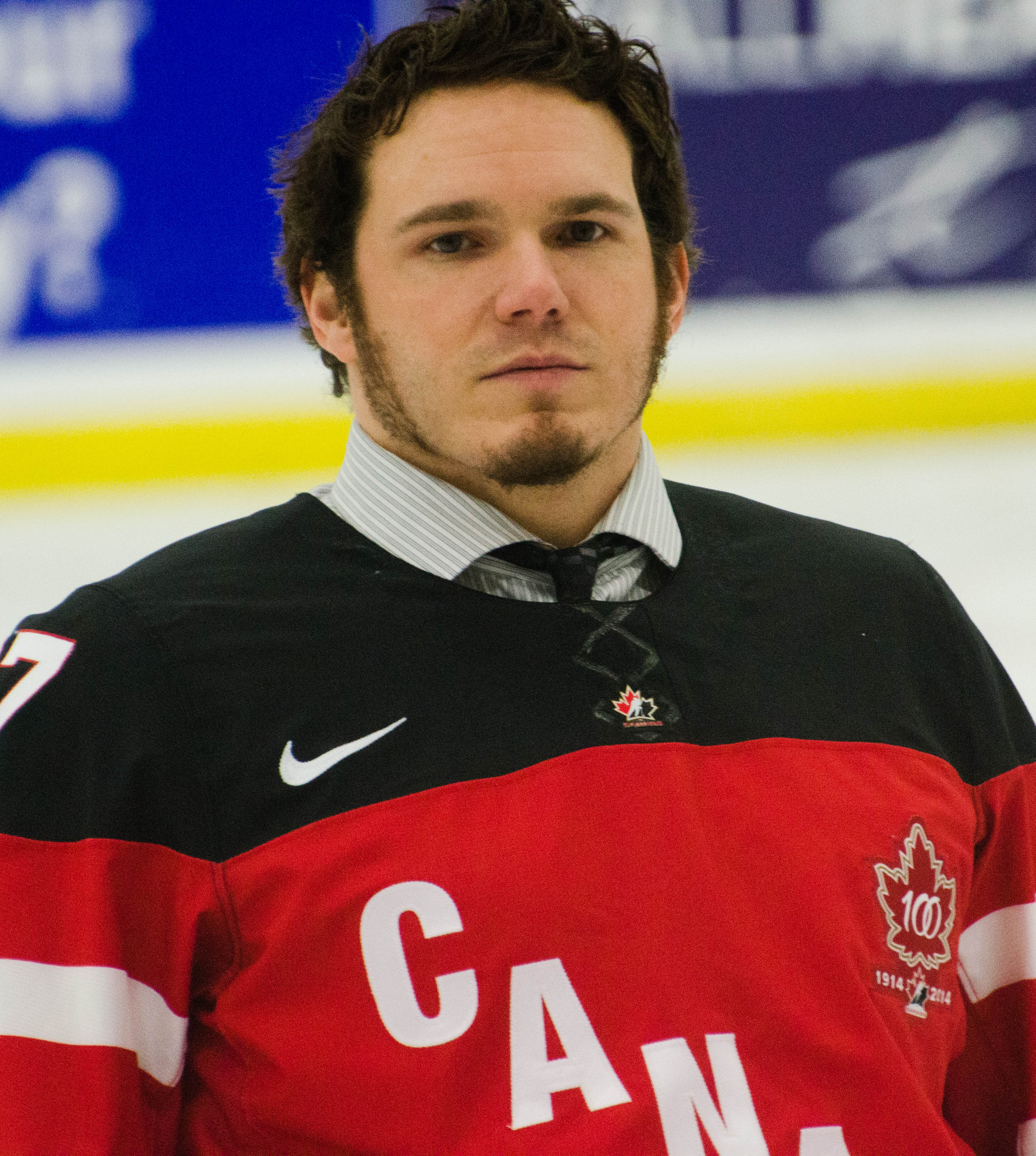
- Bowden in 2015
- Born: May 26, 1983 (age 43) Mississauga, Ontario, Canada
- Height: 5 ft 0 in (152 cm)
- Weight: 154 lb (70 kg; 11 st 0 lb)
- Position: Forward
- National team: Canada
- Playing career: 1999–present
Medal record
Representing Canada
Para ice hockey
Paralympic Games
Gold medal – first place	2006 Torino	Team
Silver medal – second place	2018 Pyeongchang	Team
Bronze medal – third place	2014 Sochi	Team
World Championships
Gold medal – first place	2000 Salt Lake City	Team
Gold medal – first place	2008 Marlborough	Team
Gold medal – first place	2013 Goyang	Team
Gold medal – first place	2017 Gangneung	Team
Silver medal – second place	2015 Buffalo	Team
Bronze medal – third place	2009 Ostrava	Team
Bronze medal – third place	2012 Hamar	Team
Men's wheelchair basketball
Paralympic Games
Gold medal – first place	2004 Athens	Team

Bradley Bowden (born May 26, 1983) is a Canadian ice sledge hockey and wheelchair basketball player.

== Life ==
Born in Mississauga, Ontario, Bowden lives with sacral agenesis. He began playing ice sledge hockey in 1997, aged 13, for the Kitchener Sidewinders. At the age of 15, he was selected for Canada's national team. In 2003, he was named to the men's national wheelchair basketball team which eventually won gold in the 2004 summer Paralympic games in Athens, Greece. He is one of the few Paralympic athletes to win both a Paralympic gold medal in both summer and winter games.

== Honours ==
- Canadian Disability Hall of Fame induction in 2019
- 2014 Winter Paralympics
  - Bronze in ice sledge hockey
- 2012 IPC Ice Sledge Hockey World Championships
  - Bronze
- 2010 Winter Paralympics
  - 4th place in ice sledge hockey
  - Named Tournament MVP
- 2009 IPC Ice Sledge Hockey World Championships
  - Bronze
- 2008 IPC Ice Sledge Hockey World Championships
  - Gold
  - Named Best Forward
- 2006 Winter Paralympics
  - Gold in ice sledge hockey
  - Scored Game Winning Goal
- 2004 Summer Paralympics
  - Gold in wheelchair basketball
- 2004 IPC Ice Sledge Hockey World Championships
  - 4th place
- 2002 Winter Paralympics
  - 4th place
- 2000 IPC Ice Sledge Hockey World Championships
  - Gold (2-1 against Norway)
