= Arley McNeney =

Canadian wheelchair basketball player (1982–2023)

Personal information
- Nationality: Canada
- Born: November 15, 1982 New Westminster, British Columbia, Canada
- Died: March 24, 2023 (aged 40)
- Education: University of Victoria; MFA, University of Illinois at Urbana–Champaign
Medal record
Summer Paralympics
Wheelchair basketball
Bronze medal – third place	2004 Summer Paralympics	Wheelchair basketball
Wheelchair Basketball World Championship
Gold medal – first place	2002 Wheelchair Basketball World Championship	Team Canada
Gold medal – first place	2006 Wheelchair Basketball World Championship	Team Canada

Arley McNeney (m. Cruthers) (November 15, 1982 – March 24, 2023) was a Canadian Paralympic wheelchair basketball player and applied communications instructor at Kwantlen Polytechnic University. She won a bronze medal with the Canada women's national wheelchair basketball team at the 2004 Summer Paralympics.

== Early life and education ==
McNeney was born and raised in New Westminster, British Columbia. At the age of 11, she was diagnosed with avascular necrosis and was an ambulatory wheelchair user until she was 27.

McNeney attended the University of Victoria and the University of Illinois at Urbana–Champaign, where she earned her MFA and competed on the Fighting Illini women's varsity wheelchair basketball team.

== Career ==
McNeney joined Canada women's national wheelchair basketball team in 2001, and won gold at the Wheelchair Basketball World Championship the next year. As a result, she was the recipient of BC's Premier Athletic Award for New Westminster. In 2004, McNeney was named to Team Canada's national wheelchair basketball team to compete at the 2004 Summer Paralympics, where she helped them win bronze. Two years later, she was named to Team Canada for the 2006 Wheelchair Basketball World Championship.

In 2008, she was selected to compete at the Osaka Cup. However, she was forced to retire from wheelchair basketball after undergoing hip replacement surgery which allowed her to walk again. In 2014, she received the BC Wheelchair Basketball Society's Coach of the Year award.

While working as a communications instructor at Kwantlen Polytechnic University, McNeney began conducting workshops for disabled individuals regarding online dating.

=== Author ===
In 2007, she wrote a book on her experience with the Canadian women's wheelchair basketball team and her retirement, which was shortlisted for the Commonwealth Foundation prizes. A few years later, she wrote her second book called "The Time We All Went Marching," based on memoirs from her grandmother.

== Death ==
McNeney died on March 24, 2023, at the age of 40.
