= Tracey Ferguson =

Canadian wheelchair basketball player

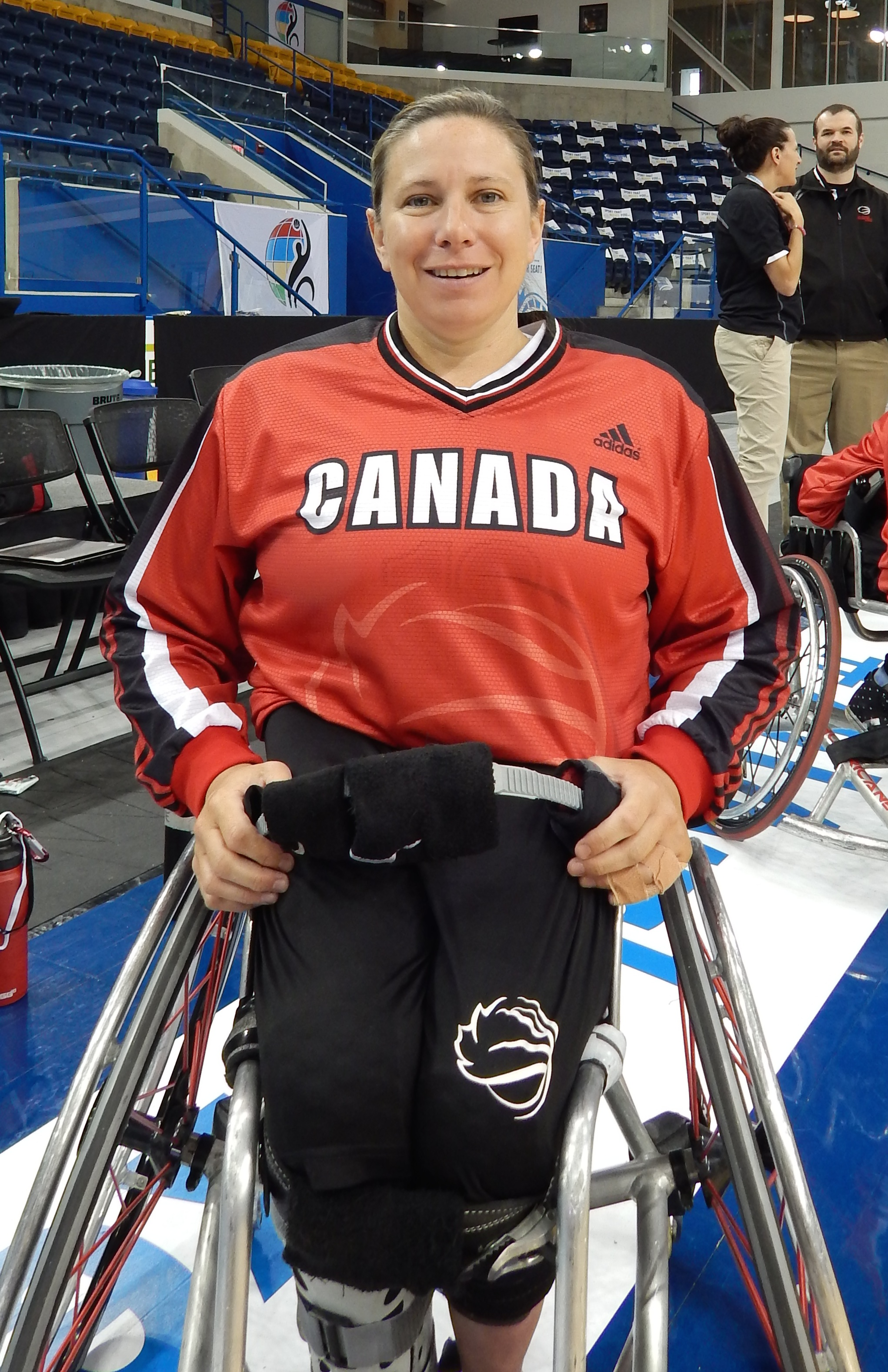
- Tracey Ferguson

Personal information
- Nationality: Canada
- Born: September 7, 1974 (age 52) Holland Landing, Ontario
- Height: 5 ft 0 in (1.52 m)

Sport
- Disability class: 3.0
- College team: University of Illinois
- Club: Edmonton Inferno/Northern Lights
Medal record
Wheelchair basketball
Paralympic Games
Gold medal – first place	1992 Barcelona	Women's wheelchair basketball
Gold medal – first place	1996 Atlanta	Women's wheelchair basketball
Gold medal – first place	2000 Sydney	Women's wheelchair basketball
Bronze medal – third place	2004 Athens	Women's wheelchair basketball
World championships
Gold medal – first place	1994 Stoke Mandeville	Women's wheelchair basketball
Gold medal – first place	1998 Sydney	Women's wheelchair basketball
Gold medal – first place	2002 Kitakyushu	Women's wheelchair basketball
Gold medal – first place	2014 Toronto	Women's wheelchair basketball
Bronze medal – third place	2010 Birmingham	Women's wheelchair basketball
Parapan American Games
Silver medal – second place	2011 Guadalajara	Women's wheelchair basketball
Silver medal – second place	2015 Toronto	Women's wheelchair basketball

Tracey Ferguson is a Canadian Paralympic wheelchair basketball player. She has won several gold medals including at three different Paralympic Games.

== Early life ==
Tracey Ferguson was born on September 7, 1974, in Holland Landing, Ontario. She was the last of six children and her initial ambition was to be a swimmer. She was left paralysed after an operation on her spine at the age of nine, but four years later she was being introduced to wheelchair basketball. Her mother was unsure about this sport as she thought her five foot tall daughter was too small to compete.

== Career ==
In 1991, Ferguson got into a third place at Stoke Mandeville Games which were hosted in Buckinghamshire, England and in 1992 got into the first place at the Paralympic Games in Barcelona. From 1994 she got into a first place not once, but four times in four years. First, she got a first place at the World championships at both Stoke Mandeville in 1994 supporting the captain Linda Kutrowski and that year's star Chantal Benoit. Her second World Championship was at Sydney in 1998. In 1998 and 2000 she got first place again at the 1996 Paralympic Games and the 2000 as well. In the same years she was honoured to be chosen as a member of a world team. In 2004, Tracey got a third place at the 2004 Summer Paralympics in Athens and a year later she was awarded a silver medal at the Qualifications of Americas Tournament in Colorado Springs. Five years later she got a bronze medal at the World Championships in Manchester and a year later she won a silver medal at the 2011 Parapan American Games. She also won a bronze medal in 2013 at the Osaka Cup which was held at Osaka. She was part of the team that won a gold medal at the 2014 Women's World Wheelchair Basketball Championship in Toronto in July 2014, and silver at the 2015 Parapan American Games in August 2015.

== Awards and honours ==
In 2012, Ferguson was inducted into the Canadian Disability Hall of Fame. In 2013, she was awarded with the Queen Elizabeth II Diamond Jubilee Medal which was given to her by Minister of State Bal Gosal. She was also awarded with YMCA's Young Women of Distinction Award and the Terry Fox Humanitarian Award.
