= Shira Golden =

Canadian Paralympic athlete

Personal information
- Born: December 31, 1969 (age 56) Canada

Sport
- Country: Canada
- Sport: Paralympic athletics
Medal record
Paralympic athletics
Representing Canada
Paralympic Games
Bronze medal – third place	2004 Athens	Wheelchair basketball

Shira Standfield (née Golden; born December 31, 1969) is a Canadian former wheelchair basketball player and rower. She won a bronze medal at the 2004 Summer Paralympics for wheelchair basketball.
