= Tina McKenzie (basketball) =

Australian wheelchair basketball player

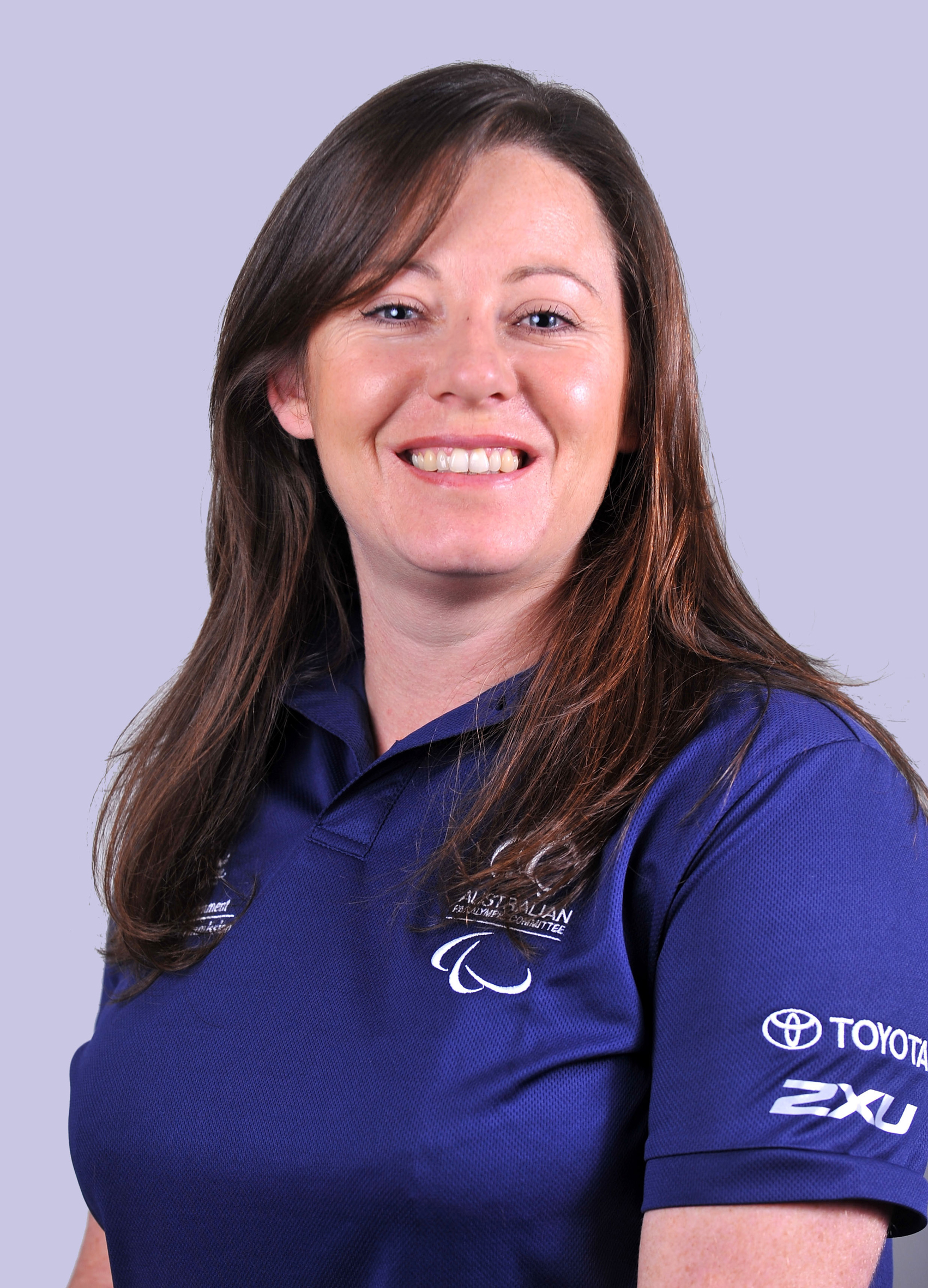
- 2012 Australian Paralympic team portrait of McKenzie

Personal information
- Nationality: Australia
- Born: 8 June 1974 (age 52)

Sport
- Country: Australia
- Sport: Wheelchair basketball
- Disability class: 3.0
- Event: Women's team
- Club: Dandenong Rangers; Stacks Goudkamp Bears
Medal record
Wheelchair basketball
Paralympic Games
| Silver medal – second place | 2004 Athens | Women's wheelchair basketball |
| Bronze medal – third place | 2008 Beijing | Women's wheelchair basketball |
| Silver medal – second place | 2012 London | Women's Wheelchair basketball |

Tina McKenzie (born 8 June 1974) is an Australian wheelchair basketball player. She participated in the 2004 Summer Paralympics in Athens, where she won a silver medal; in the 2008 Summer Paralympics in Beijing, where she won a bronze medal; and the 2012 Summer Paralympics in London, where she won a second silver medal. After becoming an incomplete paraplegic as a result of a fall from a building in 1994, she took up wheelchair tennis and later wheelchair basketball. She joined the Australia women's national wheelchair basketball team, known as the Gliders, in 1999, and played her first international match at the 2002 World Wheelchair Basketball Championship in Japan. She has over 100 international caps.

== Personal life ==
McKenzie was born in Albury, New South Wales, on 8 June 1974. She had a brother who died at the age of 19 in 1997.

She left home in 1990 at the age of 16, and moved to Melbourne, where she qualified as a hairdresser and beauty therapist. By 1994 she was running a hair dressing store and managing seven employees. Her life was changed that year by a fall from a building in Melbourne which fractured her third and fourth thoracic vertebrae, rendering her an incomplete paraplegic. She lay there for forty minutes before someone found her. She spent the next four weeks in the Austin Hospital in Heidelberg, and then another two and a half months in the Royal Talbot Rehabilitation Centre in Kew. She was forced to move back in with her parents, where she lived for the next five years, but within a year of her accident, she was managing five hairdressing stores.

She has a Bachelor of Education degree from Macquarie University, which she attended on an NRMA ParaQuad scholarship. As of 2013, she works as a primary school teacher, and lives in St Peters, New South Wales.

== Wheelchair basketball ==
McKenzie is a 3 point player, who plays guard. She took up wheelchair tennis while in rehabilitation at Royal Talbot. Her tennis team entered a basketball competition in 1997 for fun during the off season.

In 2011/12, the Australian Sports Commission gave her A$17,000 grants through the Direct Athlete Support (DAS) program, a scheme which provides direct financial support to elite athletes. She received $5,200 in 2008/9, $5,571 in 2009/10 and $8,000 in 2010/11. In 2012, she had a scholarship with the New South Wales Institute of Sport. Macquarie University awarded her the Chancellor's Award for academic and sporting excellence in 2005 and 2006, and a university full blue in 2008.

=== Club ===
In 2000 and 2001, she played for the Whittlesea City Pacers in the Women's National Wheelchair Basketball League (WNWBL). In 2008 and 2009, she played for the Dandenong Rangers. In the second round of the 2008 season, the Dandenong Rangers defeated the Western Stars 53–47. Despite fouling out late in the game, she scored 21 points in her team's victory. In 2010, she played for St Peters and the Wenty Leagues Wheelkings, and for the Stacks Goudkamp Bears in the WNWBL. She was a three-time All Star Five WNWBL player, in 2004, 2006 and 2007. After moving to Melbourne, McKenzie began playing for Victoria in 2014. The team became the Kilsyth Cobras in 2015, with McKenzie on the roster.

=== National team ===
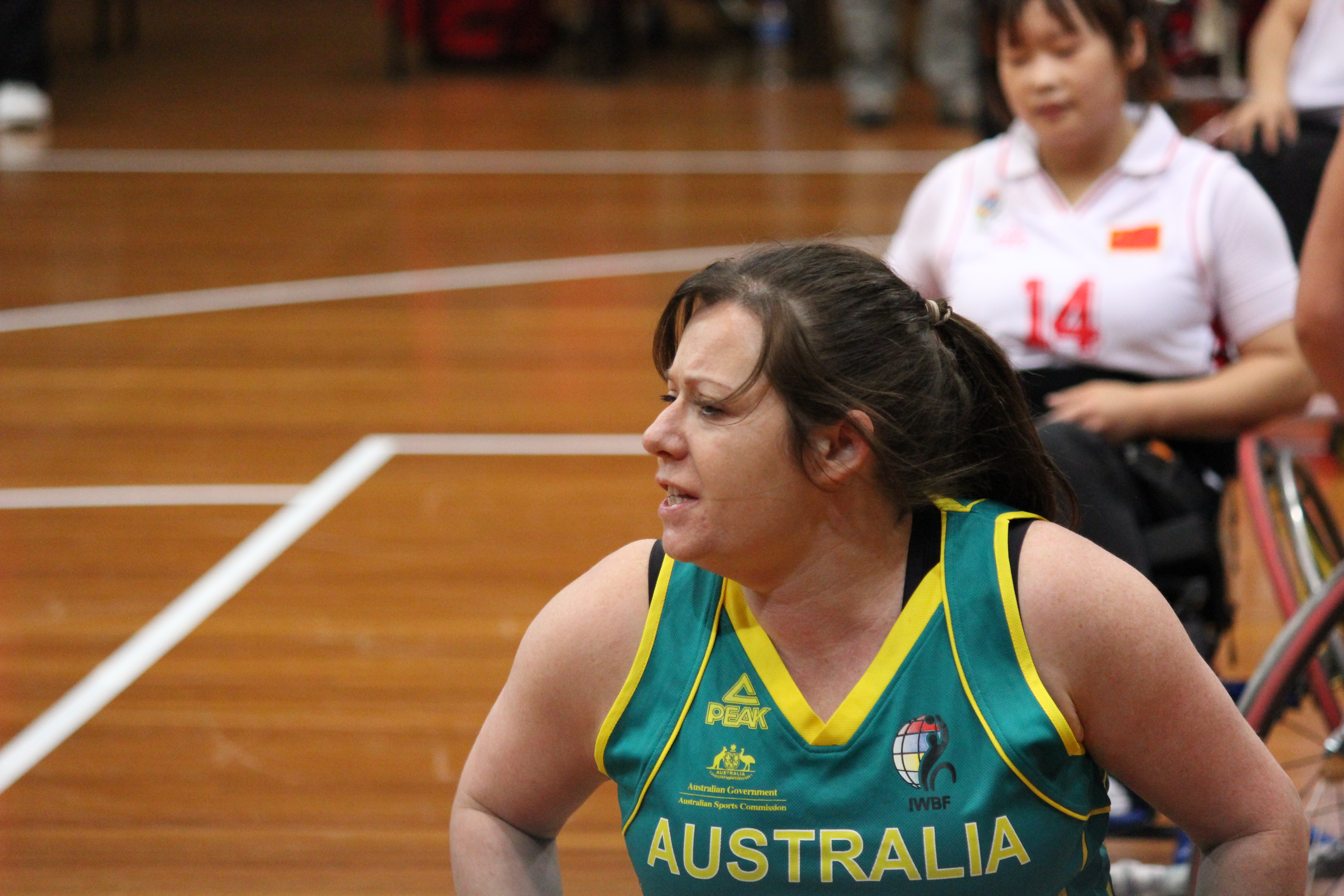
Tina McKenzie in a Gliders game against Japan in Sydney in 2012

McKenzie has over 100 international caps with the Australia women's national wheelchair basketball team, generally known as the Gliders. She joined the team in 1999, but missed out on selection for the 2000 Summer Paralympics in Sydney. She played in a four-game test series in Canberra against the Japan women's national wheelchair basketball team held in March 2002, the first Australian hosted international for the Gliders since the Paralympics. She was then selected to play at the 2002World Wheelchair Basketball Championship in Japan, winning a bronze medal, and later at the 2006 and 2010 World Championships, where the Gliders finished fourth each time.

She was selected to represent Australia at the 2009 Four Nations tournament in Canada, one of six players in the side who played for the Dandenong Rangers in the WNWBL. She was selected to participate in a national team training camp in 2010, and captained the team at the Osaka Cup and the World Championships that year. In July, she played in a three-game test series against Germany.

=== Paralympics ===
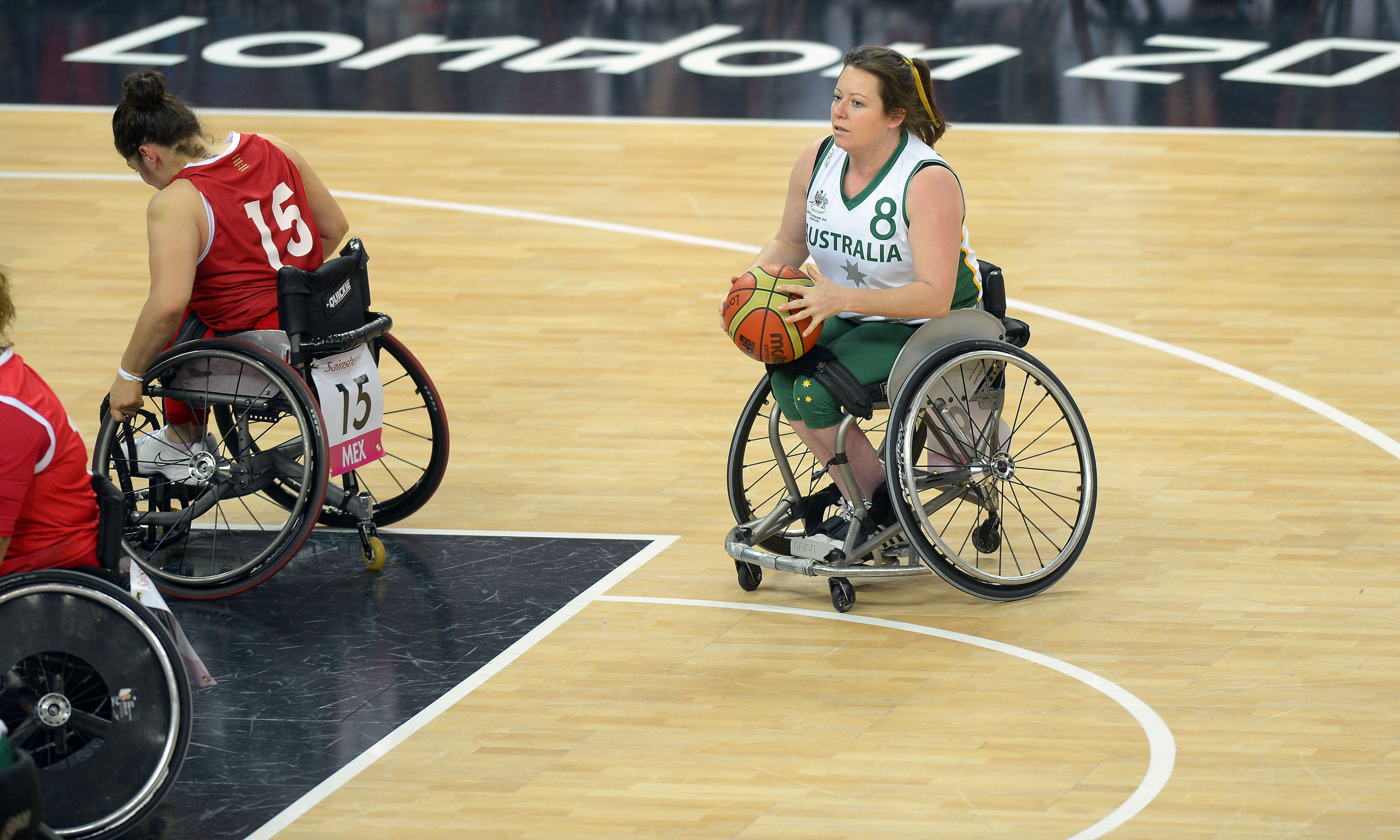
McKenzie at the 2012 London Paralympics

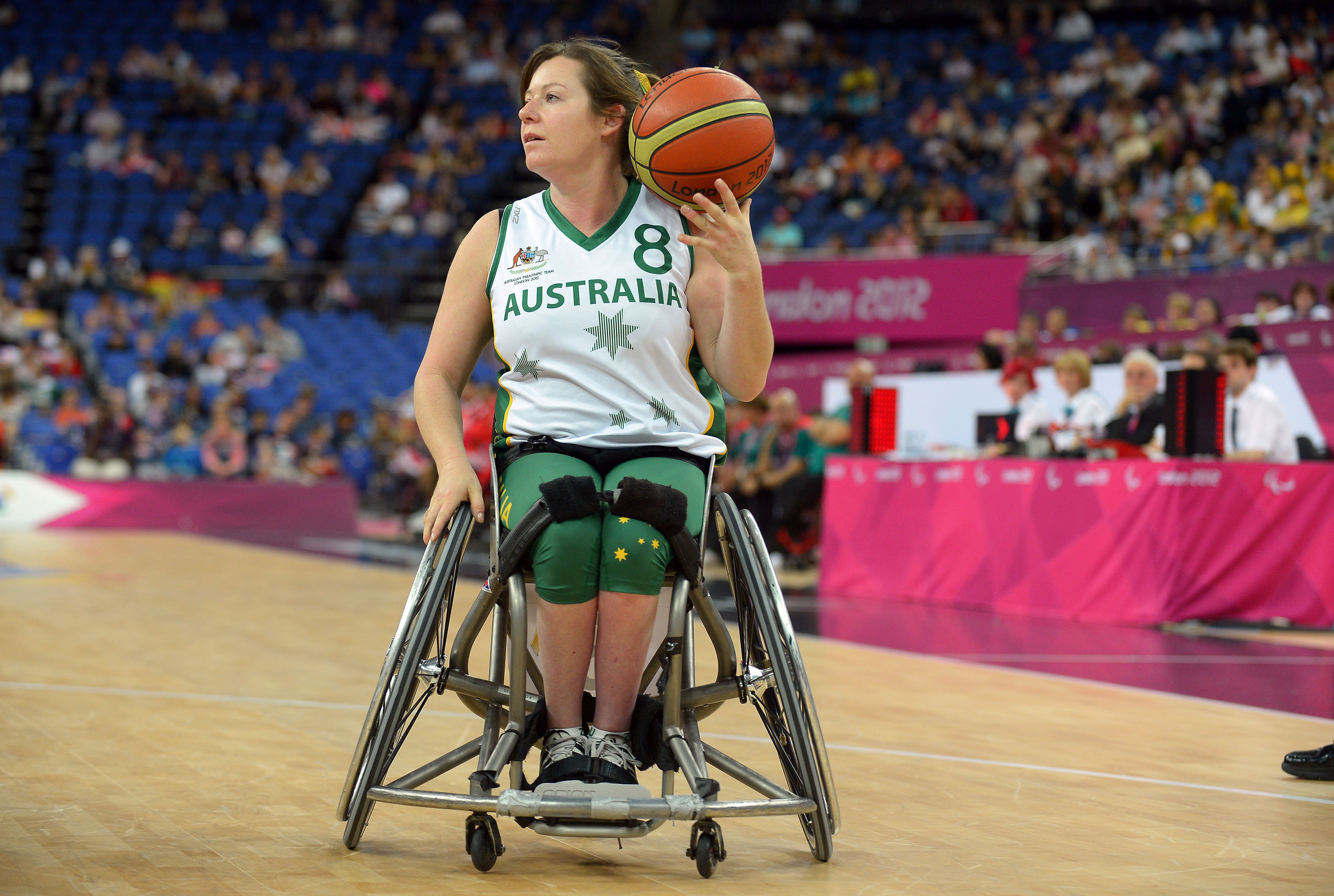
McKenzie at the 2012 London Paralympics

McKenzie was part of the silver medal-winning team at the 2004 Summer Paralympics in Athens, and the bronze medal-winning team at the 2008 Summer Paralympics in Beijing.

At the 2012 Summer Paralympics in London, she took to the court only twice. The first time was in her team's victory over Great Britain on 31 August, in which she played for 7 minutes 2 seconds. The second was in her team's quarterfinal 62–37 victory over Mexico women's national wheelchair basketball team, in which she played for 10 minutes 47 seconds. She was awarded a silver medal after her team was defeated by Germany in the final.

=== Retirement ===
In December 2012, McKenzie officially announced her retirement. After thanking various people, she concluded her remarks by saying: "I will always be proud to call myself a Glider."
