= Jennifer Krempien =

Canadian wheelchair basketball player

Jennifer Krempien (born 19 February 1975) is a former Canadian wheelchair basketball player. As a member of the Canada women's national wheelchair basketball team, Krempien won four consecutive gold medals at the Wheelchair Basketball World Championship from 1994 to 2006. During this time period, she also won three consecutive Paralympic gold medals from 1992 to 2000. After winning a bronze at the 2004 Summer Paralympics, she did not win a medal at her last Paralympic competition in 2008. Kempien was awarded the Queen Elizabeth II Diamond Jubilee Medal in 2012 and inducted into the Canadian Paralympic Committee Hall of Fame in 2013.

== Early life and education ==
Krempien was born on 19 February 1975 in St. Albert, Alberta. After a childhood accident resulted in a spinal cord injury, Krempien was diagnosed with paraplegia. Growing up, Krempien started playing wheelchair basketball at the age of eight on a junior team in Alberta. For her post-secondary education between the 1990s and 2000s, Krempien went to the University of Alberta to study sports psychology and the University of British Columbia for a nutrition master's degree.

== Career ==
Krempien joined the Canada women's national wheelchair basketball team in 1992 and remained with the team until 2008. While competing for Canada, Krempien was a consecutive gold medalist at the Wheelchair Basketball World Championship between 1994 and 2006. Apart from the World Championship, Krempien won her first Paralympic gold medal in wheelchair basketball at the 1992 Summer Paralympics with the Canadian team. After additional back to back gold medals from 1996 to 2000, Krempien won a bronze during the 2004 Summer Paralympics. Krempien did not win a medal at her final Paralympics at the 2008 Summer Paralympics. After leaving wheelchair basketball in 2008, Krempien became a nutritional manager at a British Columbia hospital for women and children in the 2010s.

== Awards and honors ==
In 2012, Kempien was awarded the Queen Elizabeth II Diamond Jubilee Medal. For hall of fames, Krempien was inducted into the Alberta Sports Hall of Fame in 2009 and the Canadian Paralympic Committee Hall of Fame in 2013. She was also a flagbearer at the 2007 Parapan American Games and a torchbearer at the 2010 Winter Paralympics.
