= Kendra Ohama =

Canadian wheelchair basketball player

Personal information
- Born: January 6, 1965 (age 61) Brooks, Alberta, Canada
- Height: 5'1

Sport
- Country: Canada
- Sport: Wheelchair basketball (1992–2012)
- Team: Canada women's national wheelchair basketball team
- Turned pro: 1991
- Retired: 2012
Medal record
Wheelchair basketball
Representing Canada
Paralympic Games
Gold medal – first place	1992 Barcelona	Team
Gold medal – first place	1996 Atlanta	Team
Gold medal – first place	2000 Sydney	Team
Bronze medal – third place	2004 Athens	Team
Parapan American Games
Silver medal – second place	2011 Guadalajara	Team

Kendra Ohama (January 6, 1965) is a Canadian retired wheelchair basketball player, and currently competes in wheelchair curling. As a member of Team Canada, she won three gold medals and one bronze in wheelchair basketball during the Paralympic Games.

== Early life ==
Ohama was born in Brooks, Alberta on January 6, 1965.

== Career ==
After becoming paralyzed from the waist down at the age of 16 following a car accident, Ohama was approached a Calgary Grizzlies player in a store who convinced her to play the sport. She was eventually invited to tryout for the Canada women's national wheelchair basketball team in 1989. Ohama made her senior debut at the 1992 Summer Paralympics, where Team Canada won gold. She also won gold at the 1996 and 2000 Paralympic Games and bronze at the 2004 Summer Paralympics. Ohama was later named to Team Canada's roster for the 2008 Osaka Cup in Japan.

In March 2011, Ohama was named to Team Canada's National Team to compete at the 2011 Parapan American Games. Although the Calgary Rollers finished in third place, she was selected as a Tournament All-Star. In June, Ohama was awarded a $5,000 Team Investors Group Amateur Athletes Fund bursary. The next year, Ohama was selected to compete at the 2012 Summer Paralympics. On December 22, 2012, Ohama announced her retirement from the Canadian women's wheelchair basketball team. After retiring, she became a goldsmith at a family-run business called "The Goldsmiths."

Ohama would return to competitive sports in 2026, playing as lead on Team Alberta at the 2026 Canadian Wheelchair Curling Championship. There, Alberta would finish in 7th place with a 4–3 record.
