= Kylie Gauci =

Australian wheelchair basketball player (born 1985)

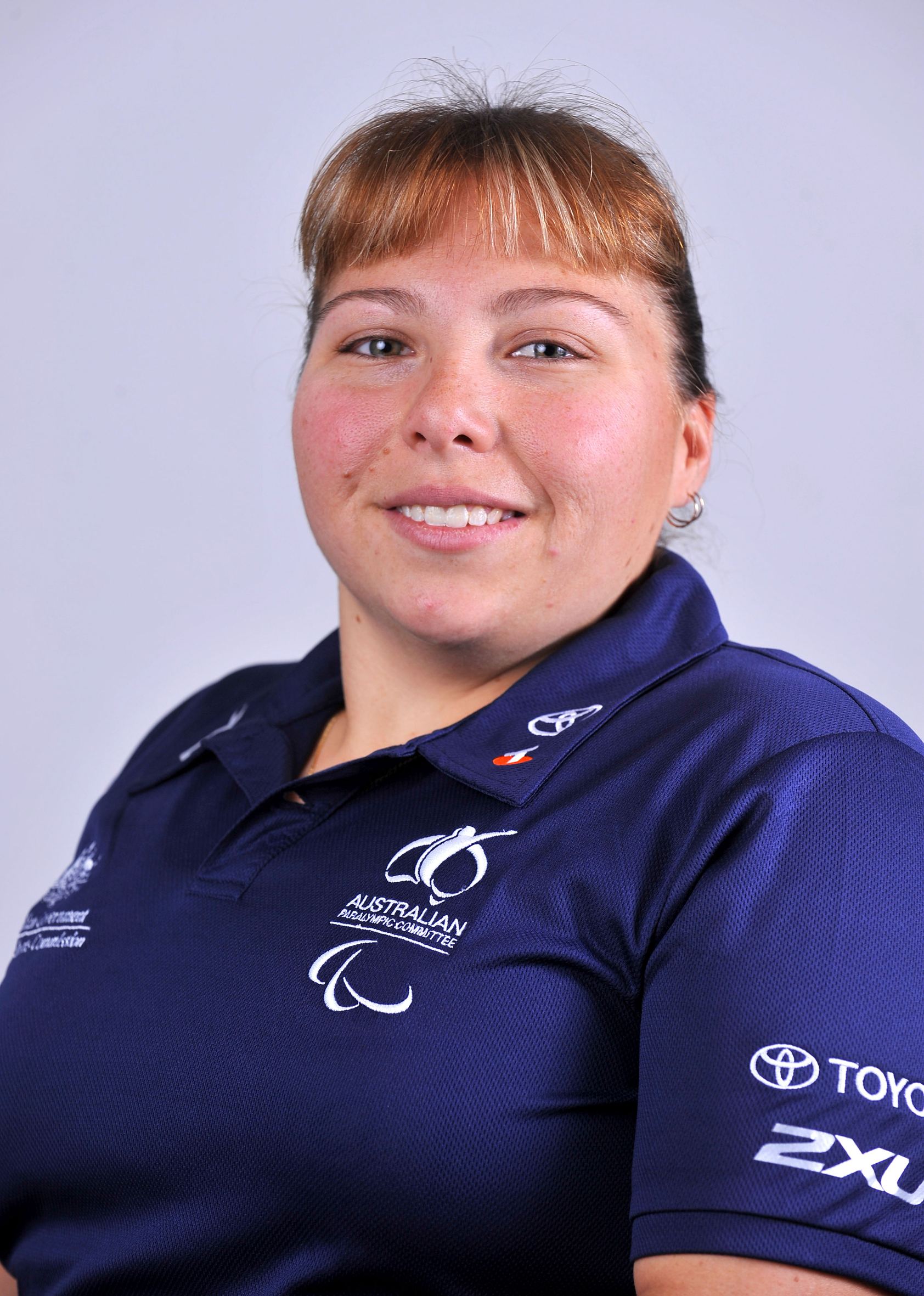
- 2012 Australian Paralympic team portrait of Gauci

Personal information
- Nationality: Australia
- Born: 1 January 1985 (age 41)

Sport
- Country: Australia
- Sport: Wheelchair basketball
- Disability class: 2.0
- Event: Women's team
- Club: Stacks Goudkamp Bears
Medal record
Wheelchair basketball
Paralympic Games
Silver medal – second place	2004 Athens	Women's wheelchair basketball
Bronze medal – third place	2008 Beijing	Women's wheelchair basketball
Silver medal – second place	2012 London	Women's wheelchair basketball

Kylie Gauci (born 1 January 1985) is an Australian Paralympic 2-point wheelchair basketball player. She participated in the 2004 Summer Paralympics in Athens, where she won a silver medal; in the 2008 Summer Paralympics in Beijing, where she won a bronze medal, and the 2012 Summer Paralympics in London, where she won a second silver medal. Gauci represented Australia at the 2002, 2006 and 2010 World Championships, and was named to the World All Star 5 at the World Championships in Amsterdam in 2006. She has played over 180 international games.

Playing with the Hill's Hornets, Gauci was named the Women's National Wheelchair Basketball League (WNWBL)'s Most Valuable Player (MVP) 2 Pointer and named to the All Star Five on five consecutive occasions. In 2006 she switched to the North's Bears, now known as the Stacks Goudkamp Bears, and was named MVP 2 Pointer and All Star Five six times in a row.

== Personal life ==
Gauci was born on 1 January 1985. She was born with lumbar sacral agenesis, meaning that she is missing the lower part of her spine. In 2008 and 2009, she was the Australian Paralympic Committee's New South Wales Assistant. As of 2012, she lives in Rooty Hill, New South Wales. In 2022 Gauci was inducted into New South Wales Basketball Hall of Fame.

== Basketball ==
Gauci is an Australian Paralympic wheelchair basketball 2-point player. She began competing in 1996 when she was eleven years old, and was inspired to play for the Australia women's national wheelchair basketball team after watching their performance at the 2000 Sydney Paralympics. She enjoys the physical aspects of the game: "I'm a big fan of the big hits in rugby league. The aggression in wheelchair basketball is not as fierce, but it's as close as I'm likely to get." Her 2008 national team coach Gerry Hewson said, "She's got a really good outside game and she can get inside and mix it with the best."

While still a member of the New South Wales women's junior representative team, Gauci played with a New South Wales State team in a warm-up game against the Australia women's national wheelchair basketball team in the lead up to the 2000 Summer Paralympics.

In the financial year 2012/13, the Australian Sports Commission gave her a A$20,000 grant as part of their Direct Athlete Support program. She received $17,000 in 2010/11 and again in 2011/12 and $5,571.42 in 2009/10. In 2012, she had a scholarship with the New South Wales Institute of Sport.

=== Club ===
She played for the Hills Hornets in 2000, when they finished second in the Women's National Wheelchair basketball League (WNWBL) final, losing 51–50 to the Victorian Women. With the Hornets, she was named the WNWBL's Most Valuable Player (MVP) 2 Pointer and named to the All Star Five in 2001, 2002, 2003, 2004 and 2005. In 2006 she switched to the North's Bears, now known as the Stacks Goudkamp Bears, and was named 2 Pointer MVP and All Star Five in 2006, 2007, 2008, 2009, 2010 and 2011.

Since 2008, she has played for the Wenty WheelKings in the National Wheelchair Basketball League (NWBL). She also plays for the Stacks Goudkamp Bears in the WNWBL. In 2012, as a member of the Stacks Goudkamp Bears, she was the WNWBL's MVP 2 Pointer and named to the All Star Five for the twelfth year running. Her team finished second, losing 77–54 to the Victoria Dandenong Rangers in the WNWBL's championship game.

=== National team ===
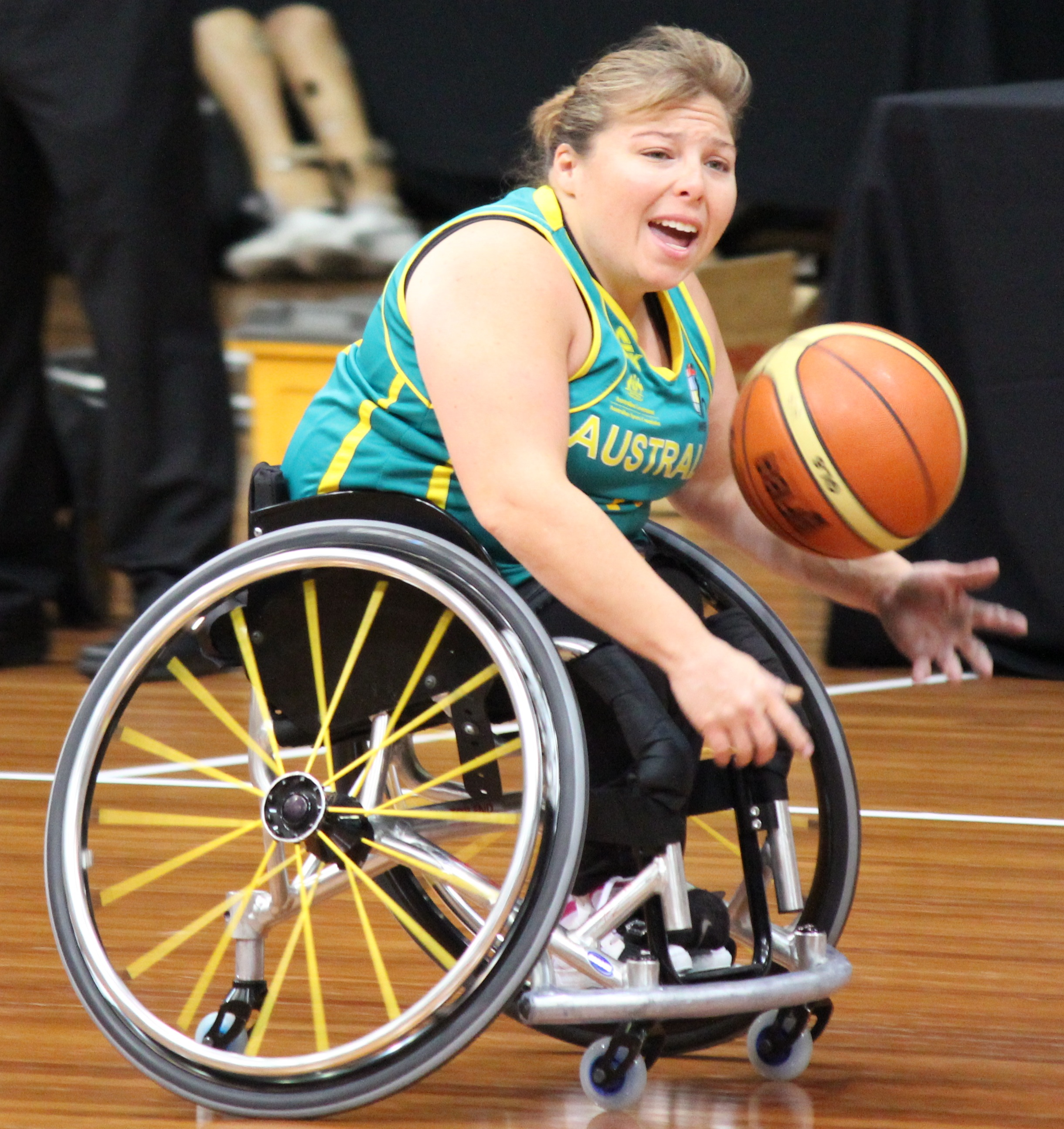
Gauci moves down the floor in a 2012 game in Sydney

Gauci first played for the Australian junior national team when she was fourteen years old. She joined the national team, known as the Gliders, in 2002, when she was 17 years old. She played in a four-game test series in Canberra against Japan in March, the first Australian hosted international for the team since the 2000 Summer Paralympics. She was then selected to play at the 2002 World Cup event in Japan.

Gauci represented Australia as a member of the Gliders at the 2002, 2006 and 2010 World Championships, where they finished fourth each time. She was named to the World All Star 5 at the World Championships in Amsterdam in 2006. She was selected to participate in a national team training camp in 2010, and was a member of the team that played in the Osaka Cup in 2009. She has played over 180 international games.

==== Paralympics ====
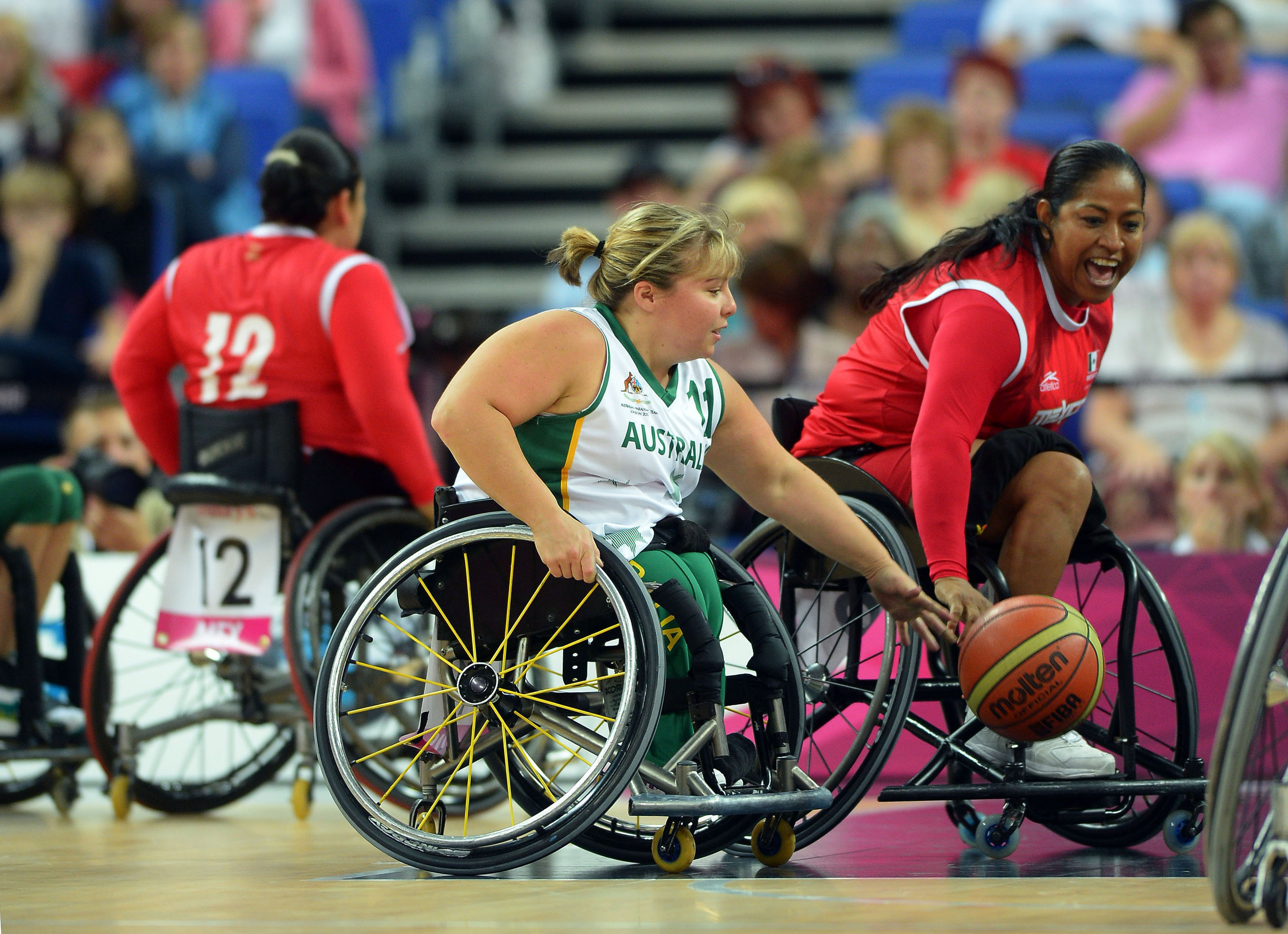
Gauci at the 2012 London Paralympics

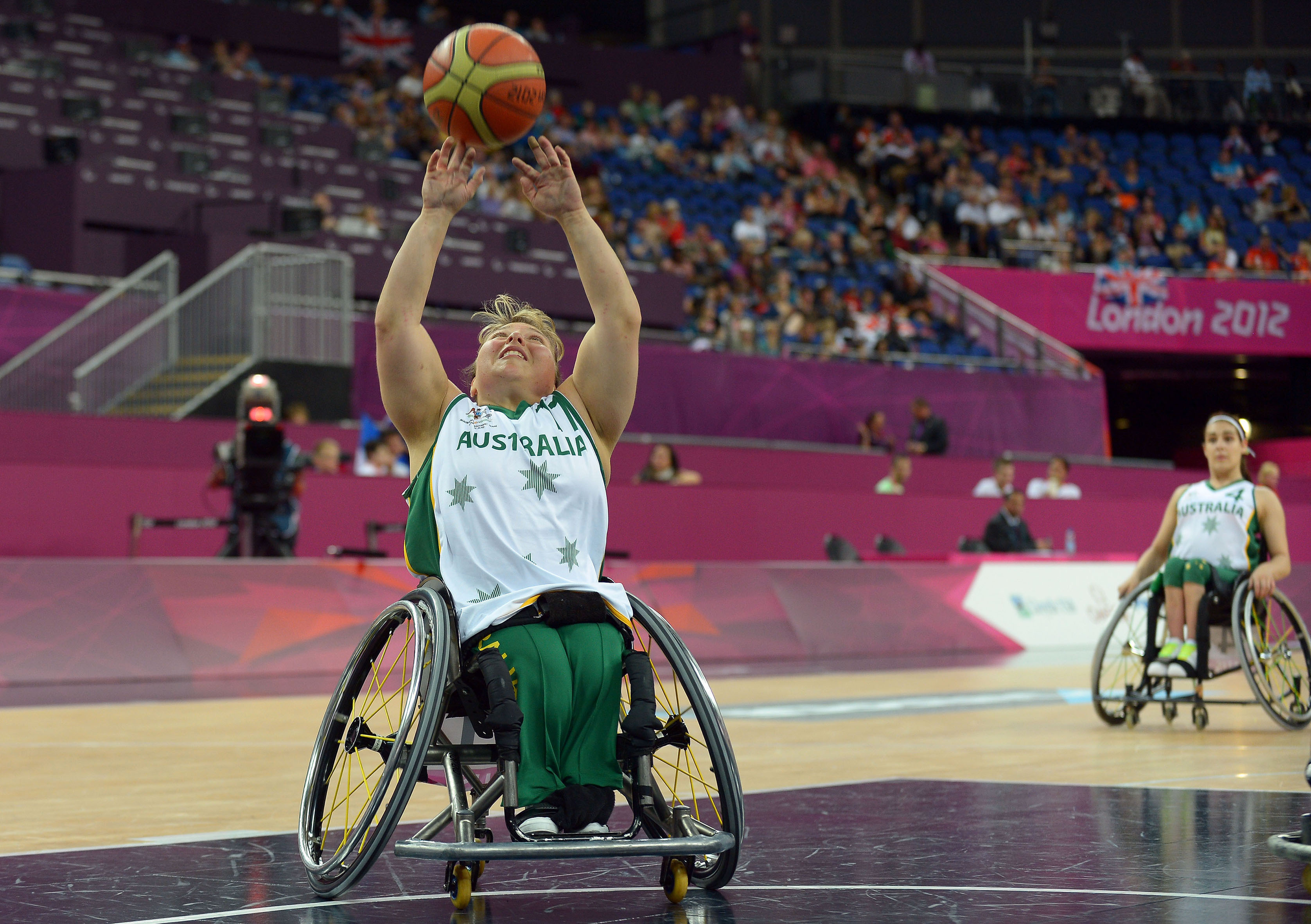
Gauci at the 2012 London Paralympics

Gauci competed with the team at the 2004 Summer Paralympics in Athens and 2008 Summer Paralympics in Beijing, where she won a silver and bronze medal respectively. The 2004 Games were her debut Games. She also played in the 2012 Summer Paralympics. In the group stage, the Australia women's national wheelchair basketball team at the 2012 Summer Paralympics posted wins against Brazil, Great Britain, and the Netherlands, but lost to Canada. This was enough to advance the Gliders to the quarter-finals, where they beat Mexico. The Gliders then defeated the United States by a point to set up a final clash with Germany. The Gliders lost 44–58, and earned a silver medal. Gauci scored 15 points with 4 rebounds. She was the only player on her team to score a three-point field goal in the whole series, scoring two of them.

== Statistics ==
Kylie Gauci – season statistics
Competition	Season	M	MIN	FGM–A	FG%	2PM–A	2P%	3PM–A	3P%	FTM–A	FT%	PFS	Pts	OFF	DEF	TOT	AST	STL	BLK	TO	PF	PTS
WNWBL	2013	12	423:00	61–166	36.7	61–162	37.7	0–4	0.0	9–16	56.3	23	131	1.4	3.3	4.7	6.3	0.8	0.0	2.5	1.9	10.9
WNWBL	2012	13	n/a	69–193	35.8	n/a	0.0	4–10	40.0	10–23	43.5	30	152	0.0	0.0	4.6	8.3	0.0	0.0	0.0	0.0	11.7
WNWBL	2011	18	n/a	117–359	32.6	n/a	0.0	7–37	18.9	27–53	50.9	54	268	0.0	0.0	6.1	3.9	0.0	0.0	0.0	0.0	14.9
WNWBL	2010	17	n/a	129–438	29.5	n/a	0.0	6–49	12.2	36–70	51.4	44	300	0.0	0.0	6.9	7.2	0.0	0.0	0.0	0.0	17.6
WNWBL	2009	16	622:58	131–417	31.4	115–355	32.4	16–62	25.8	18–61	29.5	56	296	0.0	0.0	5.0	5.0	0.0	0.0	0.0	0.0	18.5

Key
FGM, FGA, FG%: field goals made, attempted and percentage	3FGM, 3FGA, 3FG%: three-point field goals made, attempted and percentage
FTM, FTA, FT%: free throws made, attempted and percentage	OFF, DEF, TOT: rebounds average offensive, defensive, total per game
AST: assists average per game	STL: steals average per game
BLK: blocks average per game	TO: turnovers average per game
PF: personal fouls average per game	Pts, PTS: points, average per game
