= Linda Kutrowski =

Canadian athlete

Linda Kutrowski is a former Canadian athlete. She won three Paralympic gold medals and one bronze in 1992, 1996, 2000, and 2004. She was inducted into the Canadian Wheelchair Basketball Hall of Fame in 2011.
