= Chris Stoutenburg =

Canadian wheelchair basketball player and CrossFit trainer

Chris "Stouty" Stoutenburg (born 1977) is a Canadian wheelchair basketball player and CrossFit trainer. Following an accident as a teenager, he has won two Paralympics gold medals for Team Canada in 2000 and 2004.

== Early life and injury ==
Stoutenburg was born in 1977. He enrolled at Collingwood Collegiate Institute where he participated in football, basketball, golf, track, and field. During his senior year, he was scouted for his football talents by many Canadian universities before settling on the University of Guelph. However, prior to starting his freshman year at the school, Stoutenburg fell two stories from a balcony and became paralyzed. As a result of the fall, he fractured three thoracic vertebrae and required surgery to insert metal rods to help support his spine.

== Career ==
Following the accident, Stoutenburg returned to school where he was introduced to wheelchair basketball. In his first year playing, he made the Canadian junior team and eventually earned an NCAA Division I scholarship to the University of Illinois. In 2000, Stoutenburg made Canada men's national wheelchair basketball team and won a gold medal at the 2000 Summer Paralympics in Sydney. He once again qualified for the Paralympic Games in 2004, where he won his second gold medal. Stoutenburg continued to compete with the national team at other tournaments, winning the 2006 Wheelchair Basketball World Championship. Stoutenburg eventually retired from the sport after 10 years with the national team and became involved in CrossFit.
