= Danielle Peers =

Canadian academic and former athlete

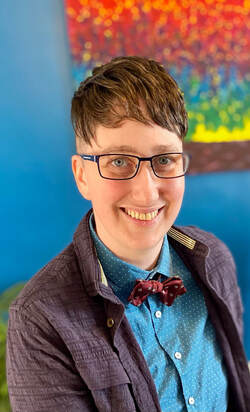
Danielle Peers

Danielle Peers is a Canadian former wheelchair basketball player. They (Note: Peers uses they/them pronouns.) are an associate professor in the Faculty of Kinesiology, Sport, and Recreation at the University of Alberta and a Tier 2 Canada Research Chair in Disability and Movement Cultures.

== Early life ==
Peers was born and raised in Edmonton, Alberta, alongside their older brother Jamie. They began playing basketball at the age of 10 but began showing growing signs of muscle imbalance as a teenager. They eventually switched to wheelchair basketball in an effort to give their legs a rest before being diagnosed with muscular dystrophy. Following their diagnosis, Peers retired from the Grant MacEwan Griffins Women's Basketball team and was named an assistant coach. However, Peers wished to continue to play basketball and was invited to try out for the Canada women's national wheelchair basketball team.

== Career ==
Peers made their Paralympic debut for Team Canada at the 2004 Summer Paralympics, where they helped the team win a bronze medal. Upon returning to Edmonton, Peers became the first woman to play on the Alberta Northern Lights men's roster after practicing with the team for seven years. In their debut, Peers recorded the second-highest point total on the team with 14 in an eventual 74–52 win over the Utah Jazz. At the conclusion of the season, Peers helped the Lights become the first Canadian team to win a National Wheelchair Basketball Association championship.

Peers was also scouted by members of France's men's wheelchair basketball team who invited them to become a benchwarmer for the C.S. Meaux. They eventually began playing 40 minutes a night and was awarded an apartment, training, and a small stipend for their play. At the conclusion of the season, Peers was named MVP of the 2006 Wheelchair Basketball World Championship and the 2007 National Championship. While they trained to compete at the 2008 Summer Paralympics, Peers was also working towards their master's degree at the University of Alberta. Despite the training, Peers missed the competition for they were forced to undergo heart surgery.

=== Post-playing career ===
Peers eventually retired from competitive wheelchair basketball to pursue a career in academia focused on disability. Alongside Nancy Spencer-Cavaliere, they conducted a study on the impact reverse integration had on disabled athletes self-image. As a result of their research, Peers received the 2009 Vanier Canada Graduate Scholarship, a 2011 Trudeau Scholarship, and a 2015 Banting postdoctoral fellowship at Concordia University. In 2011, Peers was inducted into the Wheelchair Basketball Canada Hall of Fame.

Following their PhD, Peers was appointed an assistant professor in Physical Education and Recreation at the University of Alberta (U of A). In 2020, Peers was named a Tier 2 Canada Research Chair (CRC) in Disability and Movement Cultures at U of A. As a CRC, Peers led a research study examining available information online on athletes with disabilities. Their findings found an overall lack of accessible information on websites after examining the construction of para-athletes within 127 national and provincial-level sport organizations, as well as a number of the nation's elite clubs. Following the studies publication, Peers was also granted tenure and promoted to the rank of associate professor. Prior to the start of the following term, Peers was recognized with U of A's 2021 Killam Accelerator Research Award. While serving as an associate professor, Peers also became the co-director of the Just Movements CreateSpace, co-principal investigator of the Re-Creation Collective, and Academic Lead on Equity Praxis and Systemic Ableism at U of A. In September 2023, Peers was awarded the Order of Sport, marking their induction into Canada's Sports Hall of Fame.
