= Karla Tritten =

Canadian wheelchair basketball player

Personal information
- Born: April 17, 1978 (age 48)

Career history
- ?–?: Edmonton Inferno
- ?–?: Northern Lights
Medals
Athletics
Various
Silver medal – second place	2006 Junior National Championships	Women's wheelchair basketball
Gold medal – first place	2006 Quebec AAA Championships	Women's wheelchair basketball
Silver medal – second place	2007 National championships	Women's wheelchair basketball
Gold medal – first place	2007 Canada Games	Women's wheelchair basketball
Bronze medal – third place	2007 Nations Tournament	Women's wheelchair basketball
Bronze medal – third place	2007 Nations Tournament	Women's wheelchair basketball
Bronze medal – third place	2007 Nations Tournament	Women's wheelchair basketball
Bronze medal – third place	2007 Nations Tournament	Women's wheelchair basketball
Silver medal – second place	2007 Parapan American Games	Women's wheelchair basketball
Gold medal – first place	2008 Good Luck Beijing International Invitational	Women's wheelchair basketball
Gold medal – first place	2008 North American Cup	Women's wheelchair basketball
Gold medal – first place	2010 Paralympic World Cup	Women's wheelchair basketball
Bronze medal – third place	2010 CWBL Women's Finals	Women's wheelchair basketball
Silver medal – second place	2010 CWBL Women's Championship	Women's wheelchair basketball

Karla Tritten (born April 17, 1978) is a Canadian Paralympic wheelchair basketball player and physical education teacher at the Balwin Junior High School, a department of Victoria School of the Arts. As of 2018, she resides in Sturgeon County.

== Career ==
Tritten is four-time bronze medalist for 2007 Nations Tournament. In 2006, she was awarded with her first gold medal for her participation at Quebec AAA Championships, and the same year got her first silver medal for Junior National Championships. In 2007 she was honoured with a gold medal for her participation at the 2007 Canada Games and the same year got 2 silver medals for a National championship and the 2007 Parapan American Games. In 2008, Tritten was awarded 2 gold medals; one for her participation at the invitational game in Beijing, China the other one was given after she completed the North American Cup. In 2010 she won bronze medal for CWBL Women's Finals and the same year got a silver one for the championship.
