= Chantal Benoit =

Canadian wheelchair basketball player

Chantal Benoit OC (born October 1, 1960) is a Canadian wheelchair basketball player. She is considered among the best female wheelchair basketball players of all time.

Benoit played in the Canadian woman's wheelchair basketball team since 1984, and won 3 paralympic gold medals and a bronze one, and participated in five summer Paralympics including the 1994 games at Stoke Mandeville.

When she was young she had cancer, and lost her leg.

== International competition ==
- Silver in 1986 Pan-American Games in Puerto Rico (silver)
- 4th place in 1988 Seoul Paralympic Games in Seoul, South Korea
- Bronze medal in 1990 Gold Cup World Championships in France (bronze)
- Gold medal 1992 Barcelona Paralympic Games Barcelona, Spain (gold)
- Gold medal 1994 Gold Cup World Championships England (gold)
- Gold 1996 Atlanta Paralympic Games Atlanta, USA (gold)
- Gold 1998 Qualification of the Americas Winnipeg, Canada (gold)
- Gold 1998 Gold Cup World Championships Sydney, Australia (+ MVP award!) (gold)
- Gold 2000 Sydney Paralympic Games Sydney, Australia (gold)
- Gold 2002 Gold Cup World Championships Kitakyushu, Japan (gold)
- Bronze 2004 Athens Paralympic Games Athens, Greece (bronze)
- Gold 2006 Gold Cup World Championships Amsterdam, the Netherlands (gold)
- Gold 2007 Osaka Cup Osaka, Japan (gold)
- Bronze 2007 4 Nations Tournament Sydney, Australia (bronze)
- Silver 2007 Parapanamerican Games Rio de Janeiro, Brazil (silver)
- Bronze 2008 North American Cup Birmingham, Al, USA (bronze)
- Bronze 2010 World Championships Birmingham, UK (bronze)

Other accomplishments:

- 2008 Wheelchair Basketball Canada - Female Athlete of the Year
- Canada's Flag bearer at the 2004 Summer Paralympics
