= Marni Abbott-Peter =

Canadian wheelchair basketball player

Personal information
- Born: Marni Abbott; October 11, 1965 (age 60) Nelson, British Columbia, Canada
- Height: 5 ft 5 in (165 cm)
- Spouse: Richard Peter (2005–)

Sport
- Country: Canada
- Sport: Wheelchair basketball (1992–2010)
- Team: Canada women's national wheelchair basketball team
- Turned pro: 1992
- Retired: 2010

Achievements and titles
- Paralympic finals: 1992 Summer Paralympics: – Gold; 1996 Summer Paralympics:– Gold; 2000 Summer Paralympics: – Gold; 2004 Summer Paralympics: – Bronze

Marni Abbott-Peter (born October 11, 1965) is a Canadian retired wheelchair basketball player and current head coach of the Canadian senior women's wheelchair basketball team. As a member of Team Canada, she won three gold medals and one bronze during the Paralympic Games as well as four World Championship titles. She was inducted into the Canadian Paralympic Committee Hall of Fame in 2015. She is married to fellow Paralympic athlete Richard Peter.

== Early life ==
Born in Nelson, British Columbia, Abbott-Peter grew up in the Kootenays region of British Columbia, beside skier Nancy Greene Raine who inspired her to begin skiing. Although Raine would later move away, both Abbott-Peter and her brother partook in skiing lessons.

== Career ==
Abbott-Peter sustained a spinal cord injury as a teenager while she was downhill skiing. As she was recovering, Abbott-Peter met Paralympic athlete Rick Hansen who introduced her to wheelchair sports.

She first began swimming at the Pan American Games, where she won five medals, but soon began playing wheelchair basketball in 1988 and made the Canadian national team in 1992. From 1992 to 2004, Abbott-Peter won three gold medals at the Paralympic Games and three consecutive World Championship titles in wheelchair basketball with Team Canada. In 2003, Abbott-Peter was named Female Athlete of the Year by the BC Wheelchair Sports Association. After briefly retiring in 2004, where she served on the BC Games Society Board and coached, Abbott-Peter won a bronze medal with Team Canada at the 2010 World Championship. In 2007, Abbott-Peter was inducted into the BC Sports Hall of Fame. The following year, Abbott-Peter was inducted into the Wheelchair Basketball Canada Hall of Fame.

In 2012, Abbott-Peter was selected to coach at the Women's' Wheelchair Basketball tournament at the 2012 London Games. The following year, she was inducted into the Okanagan Sports Hall of Fame. In 2014, Abbott-Peter helped coach the BC Breakers to the Canadian Women's Wheelchair Basketball Championships at the 2015 Canada Winter Games. In 2015, Abbott-Peter was inducted into the Canadian Paralympic Committee Hall of Fame and later into the Basketball BC Hall of Fame. Outside of sports, Abbott-Peter was named into the Canadian Disability Hall of Fame in 2016.

In 2023, Abbott-Peter was named the head coach of the Canadian senior women's wheelchair basketball team.

== Personal life ==
Abbott-Peter became engaged to fellow Paralympic athlete Richard Peter in 2005, and the two later married.

== Paralympic Games results ==
Results	Games
Bronze	2004 Summer Paralympics
Gold	2000 Summer Paralympics
Gold	1996 Summer Paralympics
Gold	1992 Summer Paralympics
