= 2019 IWBF Asia Oceania Championships =

International wheelchair basketball tournament

2019 IWBF Asia-Oceania Championships
Tournament information
- Sport: Wheelchair basketball
- Date: 29 November – 7 December 2019
- Host(s): Pattaya, Thailand
- Teams: M: 11; W: 4

Final positions
- Champions: M: Australia; W: China
- 1st runners-up: M: South Korea; W: Australia
- 2nd runners-up: M: Iran; W: Japan

The 2019 IWBF Asia-Oceania Championship is an international wheelchair basketball tournament for men and women hosted in Pattaya, Thailand from 29 November to 7 December 2019.

The tournament served as the qualifier for the 2020 Summer Paralympics with the top three in the men's and the top two in the women's excluding hosts Japan earning a berth.

== Men's ==
=== Preliminary round ===
==== Division 1 ====
Pos	Team	Pld	W	L	PF	PA	PD	Pts	Qualification
1	Japan	5	4	1	317	258	+59	9	Quarterfinals
2	Australia	5	4	1	335	259	+76	9	Quarterfinals
3	Iran	5	3	2	330	309	+21	8	Quarterfinals
4	South Korea	5	3	2	336	262	+74	8	Quarterfinals
5	Thailand	5	1	4	230	358	−128	6	Quarterfinals
6	China	5	0	5	239	341	−102	5	Quarterfinals

Source: IWBF
Rules for classification: 1) Points; 2) Head-to-head results; 3) Points difference; 4) Points scored.

==== Division 2 ====
===== Group A =====
Pos	Team	Pld	W	L	PF	PA	PD	Pts	Qualification
1	Saudi Arabia	3	3	0	166	112	+54	6	Division 2 semifinals
2	Chinese Taipei	3	2	1	172	112	+60	5	Division 2 semifinals
3	Afghanistan	3	1	2	155	136	+19	4	
4	Indonesia	3	0	3	63	196	−133	3	

Source: IWBF
Rules for classification: 1) Points; 2) Head-to-head results; 3) Points difference; 4) Points scored.

===== Group B =====
Pos	Team	Pld	W	L	PF	PA	PD	Pts	Qualification
1	Malaysia	3	3	0	194	105	+89	6	Division 2 semifinals
2	Philippines	3	2	1	166	112	+54	5	Division 2 semifinals
3	Iraq	3	1	2	159	152	+7	4	
4	India	3	0	3	60	210	−150	3	

Source: IWBF
Rules for classification: 1) Points; 2) Head-to-head results; 3) Points difference; 4) Points scored.

=== Final round ===
==== Division 2 brackets ====
===== 11th–14th =====
Thirteenth place
A4	Indonesia	34
B4	India	54

Semifinals
B3	Iraq	80
A4	Indonesia	20
A3	Afghanistan	60
B4	India	27

Eleventh place
B3	Iraq	73
A3	Afghanistan	50

====== Semifinals ======
4 December 2019
10:00

Report

Iraq	80–20	Indonesia

Eastern National Sports Centre, Pattaya

4 December 2019
12:00

Report

Afghanistan	60–27	India

Eastern National Sports Centre, Pattaya

====== Thirteenth place game ======
6 December 2019
9:30

Report

Indonesia	34–54	India

Eastern National Sports Centre, Pattaya

====== Eleventh place game ======
6 December 2019
10:00

Report

Iraq	73–50	Afghanistan

Eastern National Sports Centre, Pattaya

===== 7th–10th =====
Ninth place
A2	Chinese Taipei	53
B2	Philippines	48

D2 Semifinals
B1	Malaysia	70
A2	Chinese Taipei	20
B2	Philippines	38
A1	Saudi Arabia	50

D2 Final
B1	Malaysia	64
A1	Saudi Arabia	44

====== Semifinals ======
3 December 2019
10:30

Report

Saudi Arabia	50–38	Philippines

Eastern National Sports Centre, Pattaya

3 December 2019
11:00

Report

Malaysia	70–20	Chinese Taipei

Eastern National Sports Centre, Pattaya

====== Ninth place game ======
5 December 2019
12:00

Report

Philippines	48–53	Chinese Taipei

Eastern National Sports Centre, Pattaya

====== Final ======
4 December 2019
10:30

Report

Saudi Arabia	44–64	Malaysia
Both finalists advances to the main quarterfinals

Eastern National Sports Centre, Pattaya

==== Final bracket ====
From Division 1 and Division 2 finalists

Placement (Fifth place)
7 December
6	China	60
5	Thailand	75
Placement (Seventh place)
7	Malaysia	65
8	Saudi Arabia	51

Consolation (5th–8th)
6 December
7	Malaysia	34
6	China	83
6 December
8	Saudi Arabia	29
5	Thailand	76

Quarterfinals
5 December
2	Australia	92
7	Malaysia	40
5 December
3	Iran	84
6	China	51
5 December
1	Japan	78
8	Saudi Arabia	21
5 December
4	South Korea	67
5	Thailand	41

Semifinals
6 December
2	Australia	77
3	Iran	65
6 December
1	Japan	61
4	South Korea	69

Final
7 December
2	Australia	62
4	South Korea	45
Bronze medal game
7 December
3	Iran	66
1	Japan	55

===== Quarterfinals =====
5 December 2019
16:00

Report

Australia	92–40	Malaysia

Eastern National Sports Centre, Pattaya

5 December 2019
16:30

Report

Iran	84–51	China

Eastern National Sports Centre, Pattaya

5 December 2019
18:00

Report

Japan	78–21	Saudi Arabia

Eastern National Sports Centre, Pattaya

5 December 2019
18:30

Report

South Korea	67–41	Thailand

Eastern National Sports Centre, Pattaya

===== 5th–8th classification =====
6 December 2019
13:30

Report

Malaysia	34–83	China

Eastern National Sports Centre, Pattaya

6 December 2019
14:00

Report

Saudi Arabia	29–76	Thailand

Eastern National Sports Centre, Pattaya

===== Semifinals =====
6 December 2019
17:30

Report

China	77–65	Thailand

Eastern National Sports Centre, Pattaya

6 December 2019
18:00

Report

Japan	61–69	South Korea

Eastern National Sports Centre, Pattaya

===== Seventh place game =====
7 December 2019
9:30

Report

Malaysia	65–51	Saudi Arabia

Eastern National Sports Centre, Pattaya

===== Fifth place game =====
7 December 2019
9:30

Report

China	60–75	Thailand

Eastern National Sports Centre, Pattaya

===== Third place game =====
7 December 2019
13:30

Report

Iran	66–55	Japan

Eastern National Sports Centre, Pattaya

===== Final =====
7 December 2019
14:30

Report

Australia	62–45	South Korea

Eastern National Sports Centre, Pattaya

== Women's ==
=== Preliminary round ===
==== Division 1 ====
Pos	Team	Pld	W	L	PF	PA	PD	Pts	Qualification
1	China	4	4	0	200	144	+56	8	Semifinals
2	Australia	4	2	2	175	188	−13	6	Semifinals
3	Japan	4	0	4	165	208	−43	4	Semifinals

Source: IWBF
Rules for classification: 1) Points; 2) Head-to-head results; 3) Points difference; 4) Points scored.

==== Division 2 ====
Pos	Team	Pld	W	L	PF	PA	PD	Pts	Qualification
1	Thailand (H)	4	4	0	196	98	+98	8	Semifinals
2	Iran	4	3	1	158	121	+37	7	5th–8th semifinals
3	Cambodia	4	2	2	117	129	−12	6	5th–8th semifinals
4	Afghanistan	4	1	3	157	163	−6	5	5th–8th semifinals
5	India	4	0	4	80	197	−117	4	5th–8th semifinals

Source: IWBF
Rules for classification: 1) Points; 2) Head-to-head results; 3) Points difference; 4) Points scored.
(H) Hosts

=== Final round ===
==== 5th–8th bracket ====
From Division 2

Seventh place
6 December
5	India	14
3	Cambodia	40

Semifinals
5 December
2	Iran	48
5	India	19
5 December
3	Cambodia	28
4	Afghanistan	48

Fifth place
6 December
2	Iran	48
4	Afghanistan	35

===== 5th–8th semifinals =====
5 December 2019
12:30

Report

Iran	48–19	India

Eastern National Sports Centre, Pattaya

5 December 2019
14:30

Report

Cambodia	28–48	Afghanistan

Eastern National Sports Centre, Pattaya

===== Seventh place game =====
6 December 2019
12:00

Report

India	14–40	Cambodia

Eastern National Sports Centre, Pattaya

===== Fifth place game =====
6 December 2019
11:30

Report

Iran	48–35	Afghanistan

Eastern National Sports Centre, Pattaya

==== Final bracket ====
From Divisions 1 and 2

Third place
7 December
D2	Thailand	22
3	Japan	85

Semifinals
6 December
1	China	82
D2	Thailand	30
2	Australia	49
3	Japan	37

Final
7 December
3	China	53
2	Australia	31

===== Semifinals =====
6 December 2019
11:30

Report

China	82–30	Thailand

Eastern National Sports Centre, Pattaya

6 December 2019
16:00

Report

Australia	49–37	Japan

Eastern National Sports Centre, Pattaya

===== Third place game =====
7 December 2019
11:30

Report

Japan	85–22	Thailand

Eastern National Sports Centre, Pattaya

===== Final =====
7 December 2019
12:00

Report

China	53–31	Australia

Eastern National Sports Centre, Pattaya

== Final standings ==
=== Men ===
Rank	Team m	Qualification
1st place, gold medalist(s)	Australia	2020 Summer Paralympics
2nd place, silver medalist(s)	South Korea	2020 Summer Paralympics
3rd place, bronze medalist(s)	Iran	2020 Summer Paralympics
4	Japan	2020 Summer Paralympics as host
5	Thailand	
6	China	
7	Malaysia	
8	Saudi Arabia	
9	Chinese Taipei	
10	Philippines	
11	Iraq	
12	Afghanistan	
13	India	
14	Indonesia	

=== Women ===
Rank	Team	Qualification
1st place, gold medalist(s)	China	2020 Summer Paralympics
2nd place, silver medalist(s)	Australia	2020 Summer Paralympics
3rd place, bronze medalist(s)	Japan	2020 Summer Paralympics as hosts
4	Thailand	
5	Iran	
6	Afghanistan	
7	Cambodia	
8	India	
