= Wheelchair basketball at the Asian Para Games =

Wheelchair basketball has been contested in the Asian Para Games since its inception in 2010. Both men's and women's team has competed in the games.

== Men's tournaments ==
=== Summaries ===
Year	Host	Final			Third-place game		
Year	Host	Champion	Score	Second Place	Third Place	Score	Fourth Place
2010; Details	(China); Guangzhou	Japan	70–41	China	South Korea	81–44	Chinese Taipei
2014; Details	(South Korea); Incheon	South Korea	61–50	Japan	Iran	87–51	Thailand
2018; Details	(Indonesia); Jakarta	Iran	68–66	Japan	South Korea	79–51	China
2022; Details	(China); Hangzhou	Japan	47–45	South Korea	Iran	79–35	China

=== Per nation ===
Rank	Nation	Gold	Silver	Bronze	Total
1	Japan	2	2	0	4
2	South Korea	1	1	2	4
3	Iran	1	0	2	3
4	China	0	1	0	1
Totals (4 entries)		4	4	4	12

=== Participating nations ===
Nation	(China) 2010	(South Korea) 2014	(Indonesia) 2018	(China) 2022	Overall Appearances
Afghanistan				7th	1
China	2nd		4th	4th	3
Chinese Taipei	4th	5th	6th	8th	4
Hong Kong	10th	8th			2
Indonesia			10th		1
Iran		3rd	1st	3rd	3
Iraq	6th	7th	7th		3
Japan	1st	2nd	2nd	1st	4
Kuwait	8th	10th		10th	3
Malaysia	8th	6th	9th	6th	4
Philippines				9th	1
Saudi Arabia			8th		1
South Korea	3rd	1st	3rd	2nd	4
Thailand	5th	4th	5th	5th	4
United Arab Emirates	7th	9th			2

== Women's tournaments ==
=== Summaries ===
Year	Host	Final			Third-place game		
Year	Host	Champion	Score	Second Place	Third Place	Score	Fourth Place
2010; Details	(China); Guangzhou	Japan	Round Robin	China	Thailand	Round Robin	None
2014; Details	(South Korea); Incheon	China	Round Robin	Japan	Iran	Round Robin	South Korea
2018; Details	(Indonesia); Jakarta	China	65–35	Japan	Thailand	41–40	Iran
2022; Details	(China); Hangzhou	China	61–30	Japan	Thailand	46–31	Iran

=== Per nation ===
Rank	Nation	Gold	Silver	Bronze	Total
1	China	3	1	0	4
2	Japan	1	3	0	4
3	Thailand	0	0	3	3
4	Iran	0	0	1	1
Totals (4 entries)		4	4	4	12

=== Participating nations ===
Nation	(China) 2010	(South Korea) 2014	(Indonesia) 2018	(China) 2022	Overall Appearances
Afghanistan			5th		1
Cambodia			6th	5th	2
China	2nd	1st	1st	1st	4
Iran		3rd	4th	4th	3
Japan	1st	2nd	2nd	2nd	4
Laos				6th	1
South Korea		4th			1
Thailand	3rd		3rd	3rd	3
