= Asia Oceania Wheelchair Basketball Championships =

International wheelchair basketball competition

The IWBF Asia Oceania Championships is an international wheelchair basketball competition contested by the men's and the women's national teams of the members of the International Wheelchair Basketball Federation (IWBF) Asia Oceania Zone.

It has served as the qualification tournament for the Wheelchair Basketball World Championship and the Asian Para Games.

== Results ==
=== Men ===
Year	Host	Gold medal gam			Bronze medal game		
Year	Host	Gold	Score	Silver	Bronze	Score	Fourth place
2005; Details	(South Korea); Daejeon	Australia	Unknown	Japan	Unknown		
2009; Details	(Australia); Dandenong	Australia	68–51	Japan	South Korea	70–68	China
2011; Details	(South Korea); Goyang	Australia	69–48	Japan	South Korea	80–48	Chinese Taipei
2013; Details	(Thailand); Bangkok	Australia	63–46	South Korea	Iran	–	Japan
2015; Details	(Japan); Chiba	Australia	78–60	Iran	Japan	80–56	South Korea
2017; Details	(China); Beijing	Australia	80-54	Iran	Japan	68-54	South Korea
2019; Details	(Thailand); Pattaya	Australia	62–45	South Korea	Iran	66–55	Japan
2022; Details	(Thailand); Phuket	Australia	56–50	Iran	South Korea	68–50	Thailand
2024; Details	(Thailand); Bangkok	Australia	53–51	Iran	South Korea	53–45	Japan
2025; Details	(Thailand); Bangkok	Australia	62–57	Japan	Iran	57–44	South Korea

=== Women ===
Year	Host	Gold medal game			Bronze medal game		
Year	Host	Gold	Score	Silver	Bronze	Score	Fourth place
2005; Details	(South Korea); Daejeon	Australia or Japan			China	—N/a	None
2011; Details	(South Korea); Goyang	Australia	45–44	China	Japan	124–3	South Korea
2013; Details	(Thailand); Bangkok	Australia	57–35	China	Japan	–	Thailand
2015; Details	(Japan); Chiba	China	59–43	Australia	Japan	—N/a	None
2017; Details	(China); Beijing	China	57–46	Australia	Japan	76-19	Iran
2019; Details	(Thailand); Pattaya	China	53–31	Australia	Japan	85–22	Thailand
2022; Details	(Thailand); Phuket	Australia	Round robin	Japan	Iran	Round robin	Thailand
2024; Details	(Thailand); Bangkok	China	54–35	Japan	Australia	47–41	Thailand
2025; Details	(Thailand); Bangkok	China	58–34	Japan	Australia	58–39	Thailand

== See also ==
- Wheelchair basketball at the Summer Paralympics
- Wheelchair basketball at the Asian Para Games
- Africa Wheelchair Basketball Championship
- European Wheelchair Basketball Championship
