= 2015 IWBF Asia Oceania Championships =

2015 IWBF Asia-Oceania Championships

Tournament information
- Sport: Wheelchair basketball
- Date: October 10–17, 2015
- Host(s): Chiba, Japan
- Venue: 1
- Teams: M: 12; W: 3

Final positions
- Champions: M: Australia; W: China
- 1st runners-up: M: Iran; W: Australia
- 2nd runners-up: M: Japan; W: Japan

2015 Asia Oceania Wheelchair Basketball Championships was an international wheelchair basketball tournament hosted in Chiba, Japan from 10 to 17 October 2015. It served as qualifiers for the 2016 Summer Paralympics.

== Venue ==
Chiba
Chiba Port Arena	2015 IWBF Asia Oceania Championships (Japan)
Capacity: 7,512	2015 IWBF Asia Oceania Championships (Japan)

== Men's ==
=== Preliminary round ===
==== Group A ====
Pos	Team	Pld	W	L	GF	GA	GD	Pts	Qualification
1	Australia	5	5	0	454	152	+302	10	Quarterfinals
2	Iran	5	4	1	479	214	+265	9	Quarterfinals
3	Malaysia	5	3	2	206	310	−104	8	Quarterfinals
4	Chinese Taipei	5	2	3	218	345	−127	7	Quarterfinals
5	Saudi Arabia	5	1	4	210	380	−170	6	Classification 9-11th place
6	Philippines	5	0	5	229	395	−166	5	Classification 9-11th place

10 October
15:30

Report

Chinese Taipei	26–95	Australia

Chiba Port Arena, Chiba

10 October
15:30

Report

Malaysia	32–94	Iran

Chiba Port Arena, Chiba

10 October
17:30

Report

Saudi Arabia	74–61	Philippines

Chiba Port Arena, Chiba

11 October
10:00

Report

Philippines	56–58	Malaysia

Chiba Port Arena, Chiba

11 October
14:00

Report

Chinese Taipei	64–48	Saudi Arabia

Chiba Port Arena, Chiba

11 October
16:00

Report

Australia	83–56	Iran

Chiba Port Arena, Chiba

12 October
10:00

Report

Malaysia	49–43	Chinese Taipei

Chiba Port Arena, Chiba

12 October
12:00

Report

Iran	100–41	Philippines

Chiba Port Arena, Chiba

12 October
14:00

Report

Saudi Arabia	20–91	Australia

Chiba Port Arena, Chiba

13 October
10:00

Report

Australia	104–24	Philippines

Chiba Port Arena, Chiba

13 October
16:00

Report

Saudi Arabia	36–41	Malaysia

Chiba Port Arena, Chiba

14 October
16:00

Report

Iran	106–26	Chinese Taipei

Chiba Port Arena, Chiba

13 October
10:00

Report

Iran	123–32	Saudi Arabia

Chiba Port Arena, Chiba

14 October
14:00

Report

Philippines	47–59	Chinese Taipei

Chiba Port Arena, Chiba

14 October
16:00

Report

Malaysia	26–81	Australia

Chiba Port Arena, Chiba

==== Group B ====
Pos	Team	Pld	W	L	GF	GA	GD	Pts	Qualification
1	South Korea	5	4	1	430	216	+214	9	Quarterfinals
2	Japan	5	4	1	355	202	+153	9	Quarterfinals
3	China	5	4	1	392	264	+128	9	Quarterfinals
4	Thailand	5	2	3	346	302	+44	7	Quarterfinals
5	United Arab Emirates	5	1	4	199	380	−181	6	Classification 9-11th place
6	Afghanistan	5	0	5	137	495	−358	5	Classification 9-11th place

10 October
11:30

Report

Thailand	59–80	Japan

Chiba Port Arena, Chiba

10 October
13:30

Report

United Arab Emirates	77–57	Afghanistan

Chiba Port Arena, Chiba

10 October
17:30

Report

China	51–81	South Korea

Chiba Port Arena, Chiba

11 October
12:00

Report

Afghanistan	23–96	Thailand

Chiba Port Arena, Chiba

11 October
14:00

Report

Japan	55–48	South Korea

Chiba Port Arena, Chiba

11 October
16:00

Report

China	95–36	United Arab Emirates

Chiba Port Arena, Chiba

12 October
12:00

Report

United Arab Emirates	25–95	South Korea

Chiba Port Arena, Chiba

12 October
14:00

Report

Thailand	60–72	China

Chiba Port Arena, Chiba

12 October
16:00

Report

Afghanistan	12–91	Japan

Chiba Port Arena, Chiba

13 October
12:00

Report

Thailand	65–42	United Arab Emirates

Chiba Port Arena, Chiba

13 October
14:00

Report

Japan	61–64	China

Chiba Port Arena, Chiba

13 October
14:00

Report

South Korea	121–19	Afghanistan

Chiba Port Arena, Chiba

14 October
12:00

Report

Thailand	66–85	South Korea

Chiba Port Arena, Chiba

14 October
14:00

Report

Japan	68–19	Afghanistan

Chiba Port Arena, Chiba

14 October
16:00

Report

Afghanistan	24–110	China

Chiba Port Arena, Chiba

=== Classification round ===
==== 9th place ====
15 October
12:00

Report

Philippines	72–58	Afghanistan

Chiba Port Arena, Chiba

==== 11th place ====
15 October
14:00

Report

United Arab Emirates	57–49	Saudi Arabia

Chiba Port Arena, Chiba

=== Final round ===
==== Quarterfinals ====
15 October
10:00

Report

Japan	86–15	Malaysia

Chiba Port Arena, Chiba

15 October
12:00

Report

Australia	77–54	Thailand

Chiba Port Arena, Chiba

15 October
14:00

Report

Iran	82–74	China

Chiba Port Arena, Chiba

15 October
16:00

Report

South Korea	70–28	Chinese Taipei

Chiba Port Arena, Chiba

==== Semifinals ====
16 October
14:00

Report

Australia	70–41	Japan

Chiba Port Arena, Chiba

16 October
16:00

Report

South Korea	67–83	Iran

Chiba Port Arena, Chiba

==== 7th place ====
16 October
10:00

Report

Malaysia	33–69	China

Chiba Port Arena, Chiba

==== 5th place ====
16 October
12:00

Report

Thailand	51–42	Chinese Taipei

Chiba Port Arena, Chiba

==== Third place ====
17 October
9:30

Report

South Korea	56–80	Japan

Chiba Port Arena, Chiba

==== Final ====
17 October
12:15

Report

Iran	60–78	Australia

Chiba Port Arena, Chiba

== Women's ==
=== Round robin ===
Pos	Team	Pld	W	L	PF	PA	PD	Pts	Qualification
1	China	4	4	0	209	161	+48	8	Final
2	Australia	4	2	2	200	191	+9	6	Semifinal
3	Japan	4	0	4	164	221	−57	4	Semifinal

Source: IWBF
Rules for classification: 1) Points; 2) Head-to-head results; 3) Points difference; 4) Points scored.

10 October
13:30

Australia	53–42	Japan

Chiba Port Arena, Chiba

11 October
12:00

Japan	37–48	China

Chiba Port Arena, Chiba

12 October
16:00

China	44–39	Australia

Chiba Port Arena, Chiba

13 October
12:00

Australia	61–47	Japan

Chiba Port Arena, Chiba

14 October
12:00

Japan	38–59	China

Chiba Port Arena, Chiba

15 October
10:00

Australia	47–58	China

Chiba Port Arena, Chiba

=== Final round ===
Semifinal			Final
			W1	China	59
W2	Australia	69	W2	Australia	43
W3	Japan	49

==== Semifinal ====
15 October
18:00

Australia	69–49	Japan

Chiba Port Arena, Chiba

==== Final ====
16 October
18:00

China	59–43	Australia

Chiba Port Arena, Chiba

== Final standings ==
=== Men ===
Rank	Team
1st place, gold medalist(s)	Australia
2nd place, silver medalist(s)	Iran
3rd place, bronze medalist(s)	Japan
4	South Korea
5	China
6	Malaysia
7	Thailand
8	Chinese Taipei
9	United Arab Emirates
10	Saudi Arabia
11	Philippines
12	Afghanistan

=== Women ===
Rank	Team
1st place, gold medalist(s)	China
2nd place, silver medalist(s)	Australia
3rd place, bronze medalist(s)	Japan

== See also ==
- Wheelchair basketball at the 2016 Summer Paralympics
- 2025 IWBF Asia Oceania Championships
