= 2022 IWBF Asia Oceania Championships =

2022 IWBF Asia-Oceania Championships
Tournament information
- Sport: Wheelchair basketball
- Date: May 2–28, 2022
- Host(s): Phuket, Thailand
- Teams: M: 11; W: 4

Final positions
- Champions: M: Australia; W: Australia
- 1st runners-up: M: Iran; W: Japan
- 2nd runners-up: M: South Korea; W: Iran

The 2022 IWBF Asia-Oceania Championship is an international wheelchair basketball tournament for men and women hosted in Phuket, Thailand from 2 to 28 May 2022.

It served as a qualifier for the 2022 Wheelchair Basketball World Championships.

Due to the COVID-19 pandemic, defending champions China, as well as Chinese Taipei, Indonesia and IndiaChinese Taipei, Indonesia and India withdrew from the men's tournament. Japan which has played games already withdrew from the men's tournament due to COVID-19 cases within its team.

== Men's ==
=== Preliminary round ===
==== Division 1 ====
Pos	Team	Pld	W	L	PF	PA	PD	Pts	Qualification
1	Iran	5	4	1	285	198	+87	9	Quarterfinals
2	Australia	5	4	1	237	181	+56	9	Quarterfinals
3	South Korea	5	4	1	273	168	+105	9	Quarterfinals
4	Thailand	5	2	3	260	247	+13	7	Quarterfinals
5	Malaysia	5	1	4	151	312	−161	6	Quarterfinals
6	Japan	5	0	5	0	100	−100	5	Withdrew

Source: IWBF
Rules for classification: 1) Points; 2) Head-to-head results; 3) Points difference; 4) Points scored.

20 May 2022
16:00

Report

Australia	47–44	Iran

Sport Complex PSU Phuket, Phuket

21 May 2022
14:00

Report

Thailand	73–31	Malaysia

Sport Complex PSU Phuket, Phuket

21 May 2022
16:30

Report

South Korea	20–0	Japan
Forfeited (Note: Nullified after Japan's withdrawal due to COVID-19. Originally won by South Korea prior to the forfeit.)

Sport Complex PSU Phuket, Phuket

22 May 2022
14:30

Report

Australia	69–34	Malaysia

Sport Complex PSU Phuket, Phuket

22 May 2022
16:00

Report

Japan	0–20	Thailand
Forfeited (Note: Nullified after Japan's withdrawal due to COVID-19. The prior result prior to the forfeit was Japan 77–28 Thailand.)

Sport Complex PSU Phuket, Phuket

22 May 2022
18:00

Report

Iran	56–50	South Korea

Sport Complex PSU Phuket, Phuket

23 May 2022
12:00

Report

Thailand	60–61	Australia

Sport Complex PSU Phuket, Phuket

23 May 2022
12:30

Report

Japan	0–20	Iran
Forfeited (Note: Nullified after Japan's withdrawal due to COVID-19. Originally won by Iran prior to the forfeit.)

Sport Complex PSU Phuket, Phuket

23 May 2022
16:00

Report

South Korea	88–30	Malaysia

Sport Complex PSU Phuket, Phuket

24 May 2022
10:00

Report

Malaysia	20–0	Japan
Forfeited (Note: Nullified after Japan's withdrawal due to COVID-19.)

Sport Complex PSU Phuket, Phuket

24 May 2022
16:00

Report

Australia	40–43	South Korea

Sport Complex PSU Phuket, Phuket

24 May 2022
18:00

Report

Iran	83–65	Thailand

Sport Complex PSU Phuket, Phuket

25 May 2022
14:00

Report

Malaysia	36–82	Iran

Sport Complex PSU Phuket, Phuket

25 May 2022
14:30

Report

South Korea	72–42	Thailand

Sport Complex PSU Phuket, Phuket

25 May 2022
18:00

Report

Japan	0–20	Australia
Forfeited

Sport Complex PSU Phuket, Phuket

==== Division 2 ====
Pos	Team	Pld	W	L	PF	PA	PD	Pts	Qualification
1	Iraq	4	4	0	233	137	+96	8	Quarterfinals
2	Saudi Arabia	4	3	1	230	196	+34	7	Quarterfinals
3	Philippines	4	2	2	196	222	−26	6	Quarterfinals
4	Afghanistan	4	1	3	220	214	+6	5	Ninth place game
5	United Arab Emirates	4	0	4	155	265	−110	4	Ninth place game

Source: IWBF
Rules for classification: 1) Points; 2) Head-to-head results; 3) Points difference; 4) Points scored.

=== Final round ===
Placement (Fifth place)
A5	Malaysia	47
B1	Iraq	50
Placement (Seventh place)
B2	Saudi Arabia	57
B3	Philippines	56

Consolation (5th–8th)
A5	Malaysia	64
B3	Philippines	41
B1	Iraq	62
B2	Saudi Arabia	45

Quarterfinals
A4	Thailand	64
A5	Malaysia	37
A1	Iran	86
B3	Philippines	29
A3	South Korea	64
B1	Iraq	35
A2	Australia	79
B2	Saudi Arabia	25

Semifinals
A4	Thailand	46
A1	Iran	74
A2	Australia	61
A3	South Korea	55

Final
A1	Iran	50
A2	Australia	56
Bronze medal game
A4	Thailand	50
A3	South Korea	68

Source: 1, 2, 3, 4

Placement (Ninth place)
B4	Afghanistan	76
B5	United Arab Emirates	32

==== Ninth place game ====
26 May 2022
12:30

Report

Afghanistan	76–32	United Arab Emirates

Sport Complex PSU Phuket, Phuket

==== Quarterfinals ====
26 May 2022
12:00

Report

Thailand	64–37	Malaysia

Sport Complex PSU Phuket, Phuket

26 May 2022
14:00

Report

South Korea	64–34	Iraq

Sport Complex PSU Phuket, Phuket

26 May 2022
16:00

Report

Iran	86–29	Philippines

Sport Complex PSU Phuket, Phuket

26 May 2022
18:00

Report

Australia	79–25	Saudi Arabia

Sport Complex PSU Phuket, Phuket

==== 5th–8th classification ====
27 May 2022
12:30

Report

Philippines	41–64	Malaysia

Sport Complex PSU Phuket, Phuket

27 May 2022
14:30

Report

Saudi Arabia	45–62	Iraq

Sport Complex PSU Phuket, Phuket

==== Semifinals ====
27 May 2022
15:30

Report

Iran	74–46	Thailand

Sport Complex PSU Phuket, Phuket

27 May 2022
17:30

Report

Australia	61–55	South Korea

Sport Complex PSU Phuket, Phuket

==== Seventh place game ====
28 May 2022
12:00

Report

Philippines	56–57	Saudi Arabia

Sport Complex PSU Phuket, Phuket

==== Fifth place game ====
28 May 2022
10:00

Report

Malaysia	47–50	Iraq

Sport Complex PSU Phuket, Phuket

==== Third place game ====
28 May 2022
12:15

Report

Thailand	50–68	South Korea

Sport Complex PSU Phuket, Phuket

==== Final ====
28 May 2022
14:30

Report

Iran	50–56	Australia

Sport Complex PSU Phuket, Phuket

== Women's ==
Round robin

Pos	Team	Pld	W	L	PF	PA	PD	Pts
1	Australia	6	6	0	402	210	+192	12
2	Japan	6	4	2	403	220	+183	10
3	Iran	6	1	5	219	383	−164	7
4	Thailand	6	1	5	205	416	−211	7

Source: IWBF
Rules for classification: 1) Points; 2) Head-to-head results; 3) Points difference; 4) Points scored.

21 May 2022
14:30

Report

Australia	61–30	Iran

Sport Complex PSU Phuket, Phuket

21 May 2022
16:00

Report

Thailand	28–77	Japan

Sport Complex PSU Phuket, Phuket

22 May 2022
10:00

Report

Japan	66–34	Iran

Sport Complex PSU Phuket, Phuket

22 May 2022
12:00

Report

Thailand	34–83	Australia

Sport Complex PSU Phuket, Phuket

23 May 2022
14:00

Report

Australia	63–47	Japan

Sport Complex PSU Phuket, Phuket

23 May 2022
14:30

Report

Iran	55–40	Thailand

Sport Complex PSU Phuket, Phuket

25 May 2022
12:00

Report

Japan	85–21	Iran

Sport Complex PSU Phuket, Phuket

25 May 2022
16:00

Report

Thailand	24–69	Australia

Sport Complex PSU Phuket, Phuket

26 May 2022
10:00

Report

Iran	29–72	Australia

Sport Complex PSU Phuket, Phuket

26 May 2022
14:30

Report

Japan	82–20	Thailand

Sport Complex PSU Phuket, Phuket

27 May 2022
10:00

Report

Thailand	59–50	Iran

Sport Complex PSU Phuket, Phuket

27 May 2022
12:00

Report

Australia	54–46	Japan

Sport Complex PSU Phuket, Phuket

== Final standings ==
=== Men ===
Rank	Team	Qualification
1st place, gold medalist(s)	Australia	2022 World Championship
2nd place, silver medalist(s)	Iran	2022 World Championship
3rd place, bronze medalist(s)	South Korea	2022 World Championship
4	Thailand	2022 World Championship
5	Iraq	2022 World Championship
6	Malaysia	
7	Saudi Arabia	
8	Philippines	
9	Afghanistan	
10	United Arab Emirates	
WD	Japan	

=== Women ===
Rank	Team	Qualification
1st place, gold medalist(s)	Australia	2022 World Championship
2nd place, silver medalist(s)	Japan	2022 World Championship
3rd place, bronze medalist(s)	Iran	2022 World Championship
4	Thailand	
