= 2017 IWBF Asia Oceania Championships =

2017 IWBF Asia-Oceania Championships
Tournament information
- Sport: Wheelchair basketball
- Date: October 23–28, 2017
- Host(s): Beijing, China
- Venue: 1

Final positions
- Champions: M: Australia; W: China
- 1st runners-up: M: Iran; W: Australia
- 2nd runners-up: M: Japan; W: Japan

The 2017 Asia Oceania Wheelchair Basketball Championships for men and women were held at the China Disability Sports Training Centre in Beijing, from 23 to 28 October 2017. The men's tournament was won by the Australian Rollers. Iran came second, and Japan overcame Korea in the bronze medal game to come third. In the women's competition, China defeated the Australian Gliders in the gold medal match, while Japan defeated Iran in the bronze medal.

== Venue ==
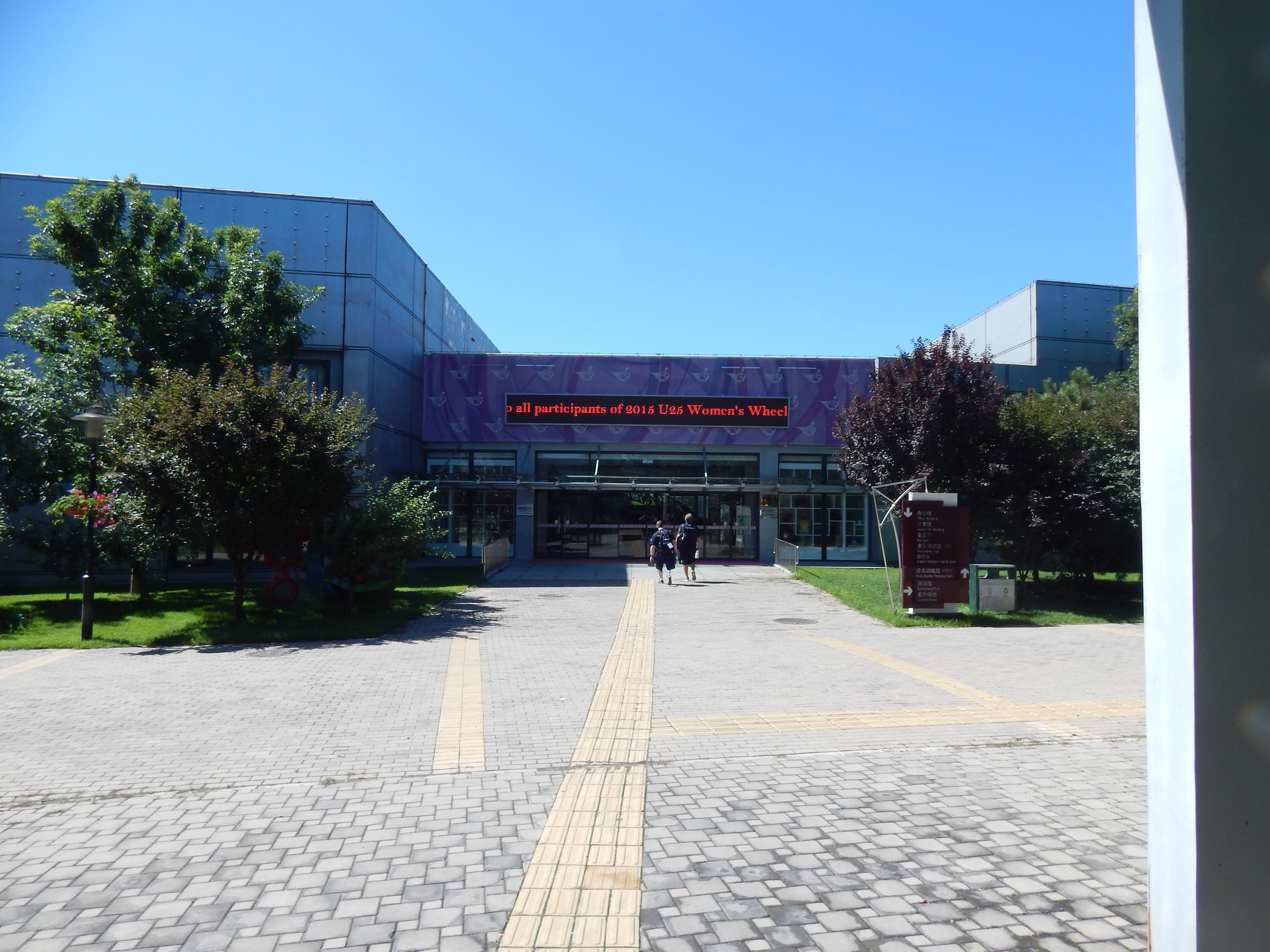
Venue – the Multi-Sport Building at the China Administration of Sports for Persons with Disabilities

The competition was held at the China Disability Sports Training Centre in Beijing. This is a purpose-built centre for disability sports. Opened on 28 June 2007, it was the first facility in China entirely devoted to disability sports training, and is the largest of its kind in the world. The Chinese Paralympic team used it as its training and preparation centre for the 2008 Summer Paralympics in Beijing. The entire complex is wheelchair accessible, with large elevators and wide halls.

== Format ==
The competition was held from 23 to 28 October 2017. Fourteen teams contested the men's competition. The teams were divided into four pools.

The teams in each pool played a round robin competition. The top team in Pool A then played the second in Pool B, the top in Pool B played the second in Pool A, the top in Pool C played the second in Pool D, and the top in Pool D played the second in Pool C in the quarterfinals. The winners then played in the semifinals, and the winners of the semifinals played in the gold medal match.

The prize for the top four teams was admission to the 2018 Wheelchair Basketball World Championship in Hamburg, Germany.

In the women's competition, there were only four teams, so they formed just one pool, and went straight into the semifinals. Only two positions were available for women's teams from Asia-Oceania in Hamburg, where the women's competition will be held concurrently with the men's.

== Squads ==
=== Men's ===
==== Australia ====
Head coach: Craig Friday
Assistant coach: Brad Ness
Assistant/Technical coach: Shane Furness
Physiotherapist: Jesse Adams

#	Name	Class.
4	Shawn Russell	4.0
5	Bill Latham	4.0
6	Samuel White	1.0
7	Shaun Norris	3.0
8	Kim Robbins	3.0
9	Tristan Knowles	4.0
10	Jannik Blair	1.0
11	Tom O'Neill-Thorne	3.0
12	Matthew McShane	1.5
13	Luke Pople	2.5
14	Brett Stibners	4.0
15	Michael Auprince	4.0

==== Hong Kong ====
Head Coach: Swee Haw Chee
Team Manager: Chiu Wah Wong
Team Physiotherapist: Hong Ki Maggie Ho

#	Name	Class.
4	Chi Hung Lee	2.0
5	Alphonsus Gee Git To	4.5
6	Chun Man Chan	3.0
7	Chi Hang Cheung	1.0
8	Ho Yin DEnnis Chon	4.0
9	Cheong Chun Tang	2.0
10	Hai Poon	1.5
11	Wing Kin Chang	4.0
13	Kwok Leung Jam	3.0
14	Cheuk Ting Chung	4.0
15	Yan Keung Cheng	1.0
17	Xwok Gu Yeung	3.5

==== China ====
Team Manager: Zhao Qian
Team Leader: Yang Weiping
Coach: Zhai Youngjun
Coach: Cul Manfeng

#	Name	Class.
4	Yinhai LIn	3.5
5	Huajun Tan	4.0
6	Jianchun Deng	3.5
7	Lei Yan	2.5
8	Chen Cao	2.0
9	Kunhong Huang	1.5
10	Lei Yang	3.5
11	Zheng Yang	4.0
12	Pengcheng Li	1.0
13	Hang Xu	2.5
14	Haiming Zhu	1.5
15	Yangdong You	2.0

==== Iran ====
Head coach: Mohammadreza Dastyar
Coach: Maziyar Mirazimi
Wheelchair Technician: Feridon Kheshtzar
Team Manager: Habib Khomjani

#	Name	Class.
5	Hassan Abdi	2.0
7	Omid Hadiazhar	4.0
8	Vahid Saadatpoormoghadam	3.0
9	Faleh Ayashi	2.0
10	Mohsen Tolouei Tamardash	3.5
11	Mohammad Mohammadnezhad	1.0
12	Alireza Kamilifard	3.0
14	Abdoljalil Gharanjik	1.5
15	Adel Torfi Menshedi	4.0
23	Saman Balaghi Einalou	1.0
24	Mohammadhassan Sayari	4.0
33	Morteza Abedi	3.0

==== Iraq ====
Head of Delegation: Khaid Al-Kaabawi
Administrator: Abbas Al-Kawaawi
Coach: Mohanad Al-Sammaraie
Coach: Qusay Al-Angurli
Therapist: Hakeem Al-Ismee

#	Name	Class.
1	Raad Al-Kahfaji	4.0
2	Thamar Mandeel	2.0
3	Alaaa Al-Baidhani	1.0
4	Ayad Al-Hameedawi	2.0
5	Issa Al-Yasiri	1.5
6	Heyder Al-Saraji	4.0
7	Ahmed Mushtaq	3.0
8	Dheyaa Al-Sudani	1.0
9	Layth Al-Attabi	4.0
10	Said Al-Taie	4.0
11	Alaa Abdullah	3.5

==== Kuwait ====
Head of Delegation: Naser Alajmi
Team Manager: Mohammad Alainati
Head Coach: Hosan Galab
Assistant Coach: Ahmad Alshatti

#	Name	Class.
1	Nezar Mohammad	3.5
2	Yousuf Nasir	4.0
3	Mohammad Algharib	3.0
4	Ahmad Almutairi	1.0
5	Mohammad Aljail	1.0
6	Salaiman Alfahdli	1.0
7	Eisa Alfahdli	1.5
8	Majed Aldhaye	4.0
9	Atef Aldousari	1.0
10	Abdullah Alkaldi	TBC
11	Fahad Alajmi	TBC
12	Abdulrahman Abdulmataleb	TBC

==== Saudi Arabia ====
Team Staff: Abdulalah Almuqrin
Team Staff: Ibrahim Younesbr
Team Staff: Ibrahim Bessai
Team Staff: Kaled Alabdali

#	Name	Class.
1	Abdulrahman Bin Shaylan	3.5
2	Fahad Bin Diran	4.0
3	Ali Albishi	3.5
4	Essam Buayti	2.5
5	Abdullah Alfifi	2.0
6	Mahdi Almakinah	1.5
7	Feisel Asiri	3.5
8	Musa Alzahrani	4.0
9	Safar Aldosari	1.0
10	Ziyad Alkhaldi	2.5
11	Mohammed Alqahtani	1.5
12	Mohammed Alyousef	2.0

==== Afghanistan ====
Coach: Jess Markt
Coach: Qawamudim Chafori
Physiotherapist: Mohammad Ayub Rahimi
Physiotherapist: Mohammad Afzal Asiami
Senior Advisor/Manager: Alberto Cairo

#	Name	Class.
1	Khujah Wasiquallah Sediqi	4.0
2	Mohammad Saber Sultani	3.0
3	Safi Mohammad	2.0
4	Mohamadullah Ahmadi	1.0
5	Sayed Nazir Qatali	4.0
6	Basir Ahmad Tajiki	1.0
7	Ramazan Karimi	3.0
8	Sakhi Mohammad Noorzy	3.5
9	Mohammad Alem Muradi	2.5
10	Abdul Ghafar Gharfoori	4.0
11	Sayed Wasim Sadat	4.0
12	Ghulam Haidar	2.5

==== Japan ====
Head Coach: Shimpei
Assistant Coach: Kazuyuki Kyoya
Physical Coach: Masato Arima
Coordinator: Hiromi Kosugi

#	Name	Class.
2	Akira Toyoshima	2.0
4	Daisuke Tsuchiko	4.0
5	Renshi Chokai	2.5
6	Rin Kawahara	1.5
7	Takuya Furusawa	3.0
10	Tetsuya Miyajima	4.0
11	Kiyoshi	2.0
13	Reo Fujimoto	4.5
24	Naohiro Murakami	4.0
25	Kei Akita	3.5
55	Hiroaki Kozai	3.5
92	Takahiro Akeda	1.0

==== Thailand ====
Team Manager: Phatharabhandhu Krissana
Head Coach: Aghacoucheki Abbas
Assistant Coach: Pittaya Prathin
Assistant Coach: Akapol Kunpradit

#	Name	Class.
4	Kwanchai Pimkorn	3.5
5	Somphong Thiyod	4.0
6	Niwat Gongta	3.0
7	Visut Suk-on	1.0
8	Surasit Nirat	1.0
9	Jakkapan Jansupin	1.0
10	Tawatchai Jaisin	1.5
11	Athin Singdong	4.0
12	Pongsakor Sripirom	1.0
13	Mathee Yenkuan	TBC
14	Nopaddol Wannaborworn	TBC
15	Aekkasit Jumjarean	TBC

==== New Zealand ====
Head Coach: Shane Davies
Assistant Coach: Glenn McDonald
Team Manager: Michelle Davies

#	Name	Class.
1	Sheldon Larson	4.5
2	Ricardo Gozon	4.0
3	Miiarama Pepe	3.5
4	Luke McDowell	3.5
5	Ben Hekenui	4.0
6	Eamon Wood	2.5
7	Mark Sullivan	2.0
8	Paul Fallon	1.0
9	Travis Moffat	1.0
10	Kauri Murray	4.0
11	Reo Lewis	3.0
12	Slade O'Rourke St John	2.0

==== South Korea ====
Coach: Sa Hyun Han
Assistant Coach: Heejun Kang
Trainer: Young Jun Kim
Team Manager: Seonyeon Lee

#	Name	Class.
8	Hee Yong Choi	2.0
39	Sangyeol Kim	TBC
16	Younjoo Lee	3.5
12	Seunghyun Cho	4.0
15	Kyung Min Chung	TBC
13	Sangha Baek	1.0
10	Dung Suk Oh	2.0
5	Jungsoo Kim	1.5
34	Dong Gil Yang	TBC
7	Taeok Kim	TBC
28	Donghyeon Kim	4.0
6	Woosung Wang	2.0

==== Chinese Taipei ====
Head Coach: Chi-Yang Tsai
Coach: Hsin-Liang Lo
Coach: Pei-Ni Tai
Team Leader: Fou-Hwan Lai
Team Manager: Ting-Chi Pan
Wheelchair Technician: Ken-Jung Chen

#	Name	Class.
0	Chun-Yi Lu	3.0
1	Chang-Chia Wang	2.0
7	Chung-Jen Chen	2.0
11	Kun-Tin Wang	TBC
14	Chia-Tung Chang	1.0
15	Yi-Chen Chen	2.5
21	Hang-Shiang Kao	3.0
22	Wei-Chun Chang	4.0
34	Chun-Nan Chi	2.0
37	Sheng-Han Tseng	4.0
66	Wei-Chang Tsai	2.5
99	Chuang-Yi Qiu	2.5

=== Women's ===
==== Australia ====
Head coach: David Gould
Assistant coaches: Stephen Charlton
Physiotherapist: Anna Rich
Team Manager: Cathy Lambert

#	Name	Class.
4	Sarah Vinci	1.0
5	Cobi Crispin	4.0
6	Hannah Dodd	1.0
7	Shelley Cronau	3.0
8	Georgia Inglis	2.0
9	Leanne Del Toso	3.5
10	Clare Nott	1.0
11	Annabelle Lindsay	4.5
12	Shelley Chaplin	3.5
13	Georgia Munro-Cook	4.5
14	Ella Sabljak	1.0
15	Amber Merritt	4.5

==== China ====
Team Manager: Chen Weidong
Coach group leader: Xu Yuansheng
Coach: Chen Qi
Coach:Han Yan

#	Name	Class.
4	Tianjao Lei	4.5
5	Xuejing Chen	1.0
6	Xuemei Zhang	4.0
7	Guidi Liu	4.0
8	Yongqing Fu	4.0
9	Haizhen Cheng	4.5
10	Suiling Lin	3.0
11	Jaimeng Dai	4.5
12	Tonglei Zhang	1.0
13	Yanhua Li	1.5
14	Meier Chen	1.5
15	Xiaolian Huang	2.0

==== Iran ====
Head coach: Mehri Youssefzadehsani
Coach: Solkmaz Dehghan
Team Manager: Hourish Baradaran

#	Name	Class.
4	Roghayyeh Amiri	2.5
5	Maryam Dehghani Champirl	1.5
6	Mahsa Saadatzeidanloo	4.0
7	Nerda Fersati	3.5
8	Mardieh Khakbaz Alia Bad	1.5
9	Fattaneh Pourat	4.0
10	Zehra Habbibi Parali	2.0
11	Zeinhab Hassani	4.0
12	Somayeh Kohzadpour	2.5
13	Tahereh Ozhand	1.0
14	Fatemeh Kashmirimoghadam	4.0
15	Zohreh Karinovi	4.0

==== Japan ====
Head coach: Kaori Tachibana
Assistant Coach: Kyoko Tsukamoto
Team Staff: Natsuki Ishida
Interpreter: Yurie Myamoto

#	Name	Class.
0	Momoko Suzuki	4.0
4	Amane Yanagimoto	2.5
6	Erika Yoshida	1.0
9	Chika Uemura	3.5
10	Mayo Hagino	1.5
12	Ikumi Fujii	4.0
15	Mari Amimoto	4.5
17	Tomoe Soeda	3.5
18	Chihiro Kitada	4.5
19	You Kitama	1.0
26	Mika Oshima	1.5
88	Rie Odajima	2.5

== Men's ==
=== Preliminary round ===
==== Group A ====
Pos	Team	Pld	W	L	PF	PA	PD	Pts	Qualification
1	Australia	2	2	0	198	36	+162	4	Quarterfinals
2	Iraq	2	1	1	69	146	−77	3	Quarterfinals
3	Chinese Taipei	2	0	2	52	137	−85	2	9th–12th place

Source: IWBF
Rules for classification: 1) Points; 2) Head-to-head results; 3) Points difference; 4) Points scored.

23 October 2017
15:00

report

Australia	107–23	Iraq
Scoring by quarter: 36–2, 34–6, 15–6, 22–9

China Disability Sports Training Centre, Beijing

24 October 2017
13:45

report

Chinese Taipei	13–91	Australia
Scoring by quarter: 0–32, 6–23, 7–18, 0–18

China Disability Sports Training Centre, Beijing

25 October 2017
12:15

report

Iraq	46–39	Chinese Taipei
Scoring by quarter: 19–19, 8–6, 10–6, 9–8

China Disability Sports Training Centre, Beijing

==== Group B ====
Pos	Team	Pld	W	L	PF	PA	PD	Pts	Qualification
1	Japan	2	2	0	203	33	+170	4	Quarterfinals
2	Hong Kong	2	1	1	68	154	−86	3	Quarterfinals
3	Kuwait	2	0	2	68	152	−84	2	9th–12th place

Source: IWBF
Rules for classification: 1) Points; 2) Head-to-head results; 3) Points difference; 4) Points scored.

23 October 2017
11:00

report

Japan	96–21	Kuwait
Scoring by quarter: 18–6, 29–9, 27–4, 22–2

China Disability Sports Training Centre, Beijing

24 October 2017
17:45

report

Kuwait	47–56	Hong Kong
Scoring by quarter: 9–416, 12–13, 10–12, 16–15

China Disability Sports Training Centre, Beijing

25 October 2017
15:30

report

Hong Kong	12–107	Japan
Scoring by quarter: 0–31, 0–21, 6–27, 6–28

China Disability Sports Training Centre, Beijing

==== Group C ====
Pos	Team	Pld	W	L	PF	PA	PD	Pts	Qualification
1	Iran	3	3	0	228	108	+120	6	Quarterfinals
2	Thailand	3	2	1	215	191	+24	5	Quarterfinals
3	New Zealand	3	1	2	120	180	−60	4	9th–12th place
4	Saudi Arabia	3	0	3	120	204	−84	3	Thirteenth place game

Source: IWBF
Rules for classification: 1) Points; 2) Head-to-head results; 3) Points difference; 4) Points scored.

23 October 2017
17:15

report

Thailand	85–54	New Zealand
Scoring by quarter: 12–15, 22–6, 23–18, 28–15

China Disability Sports Training Centre, Beijing

23 October 2017
13:15

report

Iran	85–31	Saudi Arabia
Scoring by quarter: 24–11, 29–4, 30–14, 2–2

China Disability Sports Training Centre, Beijing

24 October 2017
16:45

report

Saudi Arabia	48–68	Thailand
Scoring by quarter: 8–22, 6–11, 16–20, 18–15

China Disability Sports Training Centre, Beijing

24 October 2017
11:00

report

New Zealand	15–54	Iran
Scoring by quarter: 4–29, 0–26, 2–11, 9–25

China Disability Sports Training Centre, Beijing

25 October 2017
16:45

report

Thailand	62–89	Iran
Scoring by quarter: 12–22, 14–25, 25–33, 10–9

China Disability Sports Training Centre, Beijing

25 October 2017
13:15

report

New Zealand	51–41	Saudi Arabia
Scoring by quarter: 25–20, 0–0, 11–10, 15–11

China Disability Sports Training Centre, Beijing

==== Group D ====
Pos	Team	Pld	W	L	PF	PA	PD	Pts	Qualification
1	South Korea	3	3	0	264	94	+170	6	Quarterfinals
2	China (H)	3	2	1	244	125	+119	5	Quarterfinals
3	United Arab Emirates	3	1	2	101	237	−136	4	9th–12th place
4	Afghanistan	3	0	3	97	250	−153	3	Thirteenth place game

Source: IWBF
Rules for classification: 1) Points; 2) Head-to-head results; 3) Points difference; 4) Points scored.
(H) Hosts

23 October 2017
10:30

report

China	87–34	Afghanistan
Scoring by quarter: 21–1, 28–10, 14–15, 24–8

China Disability Sports Training Centre, Beijing

23 October 2017
17:45

report

South Korea	90–21	United Arab Emirates
Scoring by quarter: 30–4, 16–4, 26–4, 18–9

China Disability Sports Training Centre, Beijing

24 October 2017
14:30

report

United Arab Emirates	24–106	China
Scoring by quarter: 12–22, 6–22, 2–28, 4–34

China Disability Sports Training Centre, Beijing

24 October 2017
15:30

report

Afghanistan	22–107	South Korea
Scoring by quarter: 2–32, 9–32, 4–11, 7–32

China Disability Sports Training Centre, Beijing

25 October 2017
10:00

report

China	51–67	South Korea
Scoring by quarter: 14–22, 8–10, 12–22, 17–13

China Disability Sports Training Centre, Beijing

25 October 2017
11:00

report

United Arab Emirates	56–41	Afghanistan
Scoring by quarter: 18–10, 8–8, 12–5, 18–18

China Disability Sports Training Centre, Beijing

=== Final round ===
==== 9th–13th bracket ====
Consolation (9th–12th)
A3	Chinese Taipei	58
C3	New Zealand	48
B3	Kuwait	57
D3	United Arab Emirates	48

Placement (Ninth place)
A3	Chinese Taipei	66
B3	Kuwait	49
Placement (Eleventh place)
C3	New Zealand	60
D3	United Arab Emirates	42

Placement (Thirteenth place)
D4	Afghanistan	49
C4	Saudi Arabia	64

===== 9th–12th classification =====
26 October 2017
11:15

report

Chinese Taipei	58–48	New Zealand
Scoring by quarter: 24–13, 10–12, 10–10, 14–13

China Disability Sports Training Centre, Beijing

26 October 2017
13:30

report

Kuwait	57–48	United Arab Emirates
Scoring by quarter: 26–17, 16–7, 11–12, 14–12

China Disability Sports Training Centre, Beijing

===== Thirteenth place game =====
26 October 2017
09:00

report

Afghanistan	49–64	Saudi Arabia
Scoring by quarter: 10–11, 20–14, 8–23, 11–16

China Disability Sports Training Centre, Beijing

===== Eleventh place game =====
27 October 2017
10:00

report

New Zealand	60–42	United Arab Emirates
Scoring by quarter: 17–12, 14–16, 16–7, 13–7

China Disability Sports Training Centre, Beijing

===== Ninth place game =====
26 October 2017
12:15

report

Chinese Taipei	66–49	Kuwait
Scoring by quarter: 13–6, 24–14, 18–13, 11–18

China Disability Sports Training Centre, Beijing

==== 1st–8th bracket ====
Placement (Fifth place)
C2	Thailand	68
D2	China	75
Placement (Seventh place)
B2	Hong Kong	47
A2	Iraq	72

Consolation (5th–8th)
B2	Hong Kong	33
C2	Thailand	51
A2	Iraq	33
D2	China	80

Quarterfinals
A1	Australia	102
B2	Hong Kong	10
D1	South Korea	57
C2	Thailand	32
B1	Japan	95
A2	Iraq	34
C1	Iran	86
D2	China	45

Semifinals
A1	Australia	81
D1	South Korea	50
B1	Japan	76
C1	Iran	80

Final
A1	Australia	80
C1	Iran	54
Bronze medal game
D1	South Korea	54
B1	Japan	68

===== Quarterfinals =====
26 October 2017
11:00

report

Australia	102–10	Hong Kong
Scoring by quarter: 24–3, 22–0, 28–1, 28–6

China Disability Sports Training Centre, Beijing

26 October 2017
13:15

report

Japan	95–34	Iraq
Scoring by quarter: 29–5, 16–11, 29–7, 21–11

China Disability Sports Training Centre, Beijing

26 October 2017
15:30

report

Iran	86–45	China
Scoring by quarter: 32–8, 20–6, 12–12, 22–19

China Disability Sports Training Centre, Beijing

26 October 2017
17:45

report

South Korea	67–32	Thailand
Scoring by quarter: 22–8, 14–0, 17–7, 14–17

China Disability Sports Training Centre, Beijing

===== 5th–8th classification =====
27 October 2017
14:30

report

Hong Kong	33–51	Thailand
Scoring by quarter: 8–9, 7–15, 8–15, 10–14

China Disability Sports Training Centre, Beijing

27 October 2017
16:45

report

Iraq	33–80	China
Scoring by quarter: 2–20, 4–19, 13–19, 14–22

China Disability Sports Training Centre, Beijing

===== Semifinals =====
27 October 2017
13:15

report

Australia	81–50	South Korea
Scoring by quarter: 20–17, 18–13, 28–9, 15–11

China Disability Sports Training Centre, Beijing

27 October 2017
11:30

report

Japan	76–80	Iran
Scoring by quarter: 18–17, 24–16, 22–26, 12–21

China Disability Sports Training Centre, Beijing

===== Seventh place game =====
28 October 2017
09:00

report

Hong Kong	47–72	Iraq
Scoring by quarter: 17–17, 10–17, 5–19, 15–19

China Disability Sports Training Centre, Beijing

===== Fifth place game =====
28 October 2017
11:15

report

Thailand	68–75	China
Scoring by quarter: 11–14, 19–21, 22–22, 16–18

China Disability Sports Training Centre, Beijing

===== Third place game =====
28 October 2017
11:45

report

South Korea	54–68	Japan
'Scoring by quarter: 16–17, 14–10, 24–41, 0–0

China Disability Sports Training Centre, Beijing

===== Final =====
28 October 2017
14:00

report

Australia	80–54	Iran
Scoring by quarter: 23–7, 10–14, 27–16, 20–17

China Disability Sports Training Centre, Beijing

== Women's ==
=== Round robin ===
Pos	Team	Pld	W	L	PF	PA	PD	Pts
1	China	3	3	0	182	106	+76	6
2	Australia	3	2	1	227	120	+107	5
3	Japan	3	1	2	185	178	+7	4
4	Iran	3	0	3	45	235	−190	3

Source: IWBF
Rules for classification: 1) Points; 2) Head-to-head results; 3) Points difference; 4) Points scored.

23 October 2017
12:45

report

China	53–44	Australia
Scoring by quarter: 12–8, 12–6, 17–8, 12–22

China Disability Sports Training Centre, Beijing

23 October 2017
15:30

report

Japan	86–15	Iran
Scoring by quarter: 26–4, 22–2, 21–5, 17–4

China Disability Sports Training Centre, Beijing

24 October 2017
10:00

report

Australia	75–59	Japan
Scoring by quarter: 24–14, 18–14, 20–15, 13–16

China Disability Sports Training Centre, Beijing

24 October 2017
12:15

report

Iran	22–79	China
Scoring by quarter: 2–15, 11–23, 5–25, 4–18

China Disability Sports Training Centre, Beijing

25 October 2017
14:30

report

Australia	108–8	Iran
Scoring by quarter: 30–0, 27–4, 28–0, 23–4

China Disability Sports Training Centre, Beijing

25 October 2017
17:45

report

China	50–40	Japan
Scoring by quarter: 12–6, 11–10, 14–14, 13–10

China Disability Sports Training Centre, Beijing

=== Final round ===
Semifinals
W1	China	108
W4	Iran	4
W2	Australia	71
W3	Japan	41

Gold Medal Match
SF1	China	57
SF2	Australia	46
Bronze Medal Match
SF1	Japan	76
SF2	Iran	19

==== Semifinals ====
26 October 2017
15:45

report

Australia	71–41	Japan
Scoring by quarter: 17–6, 20–10, 18–10, 16–15

China Disability Sports Training Centre, Beijing

26 October 2017
18:00

report

China	108–4	Iran
Scoring by quarter: 25–4, 32–0, 26–0, 25–0

China Disability Sports Training Centre, Beijing

==== Third place game ====
27 October 2017
15:40

report

Japan	76–19	Iran
Scoring by quarter: 18–6, 17–6, 20–3, 20–4

China Disability Sports Training Centre, Beijing

==== Final ====
27 October 2017
17:45

report

China	57–46	Australia
Scoring by quarter: 12–16, 11–8, 8–8, 26–14

China Disability Sports Training Centre, Beijing

== All Stars ==
=== Men ===
All Star Five

- (Iran) Mohammadhasan Sayari (4.0)
- (Australia) Jannik Blair (1.0)
- (South Korea) Dong Suk-oh (2.0)
- (Australia) Tom O'Neill-Thorne (3.0)
- (Japan) Hiroaki Kozai (3.5)

Most Valuable Player

- (Iran) Omid Hadiazhar (4.0)

=== Women ===
All Star Five

- (Japan) Mari Amimoto (4.5)
- (Australia) Cobi Crispin (4.0)
- (China) Xuejing Chen (1.0)
- (Australia) Clare Nott (1.0)
- (China) Suiling Lin (3.0)

Most Valuable Player

- (Australia) Amber Merritt (4.5)

== Final standings ==
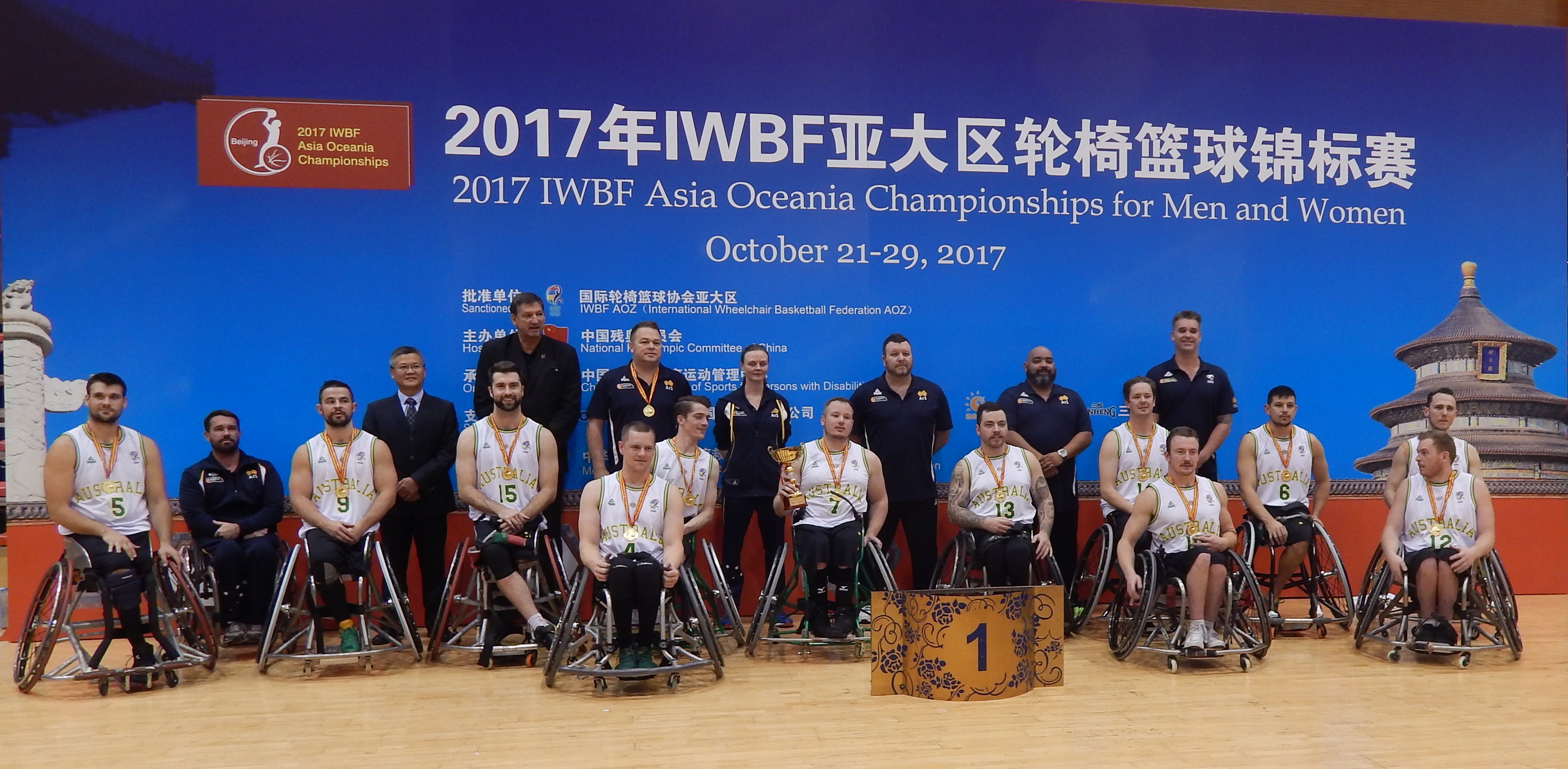
Men's Gold Medal team – Australia

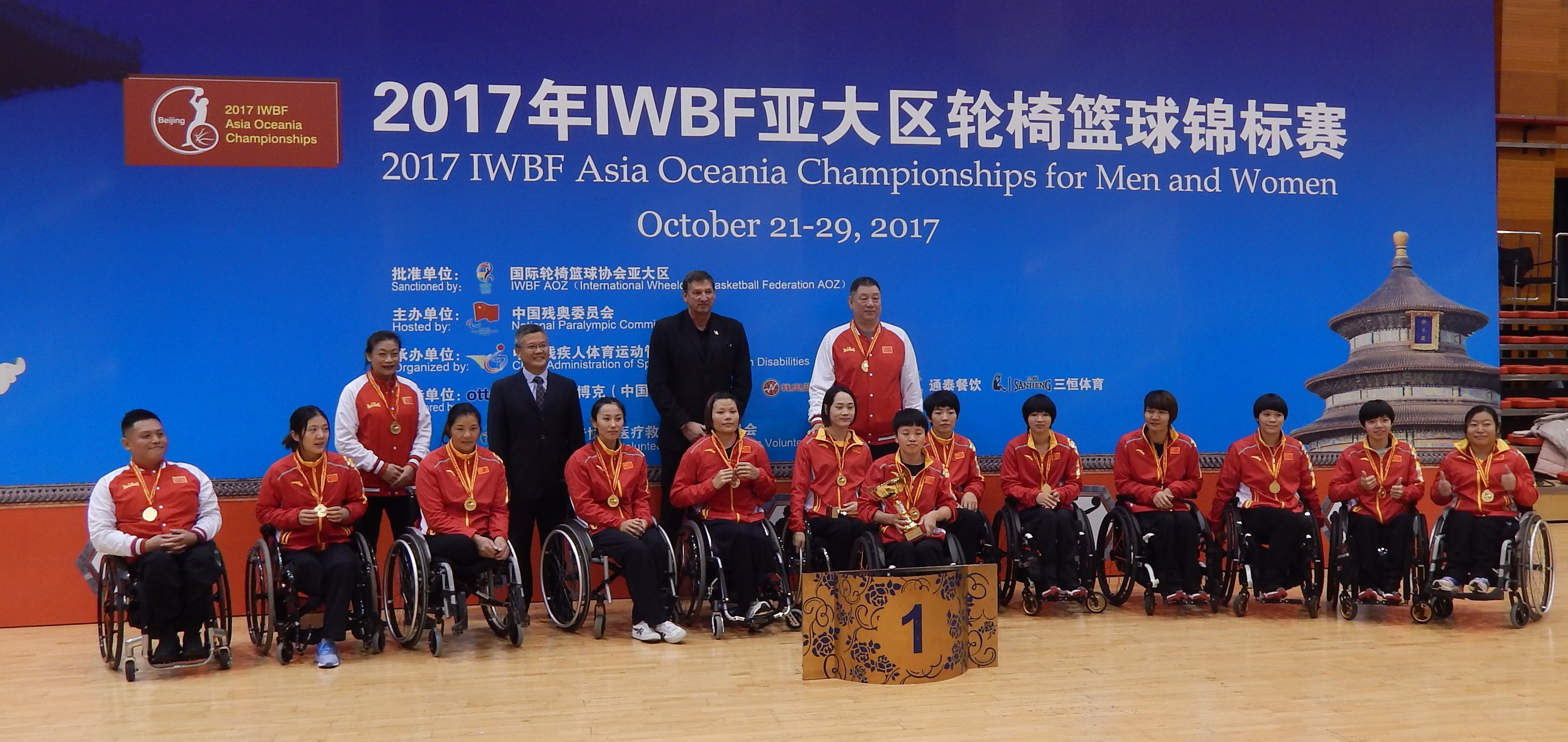
Women's Gold Medal team – China

=== Men ===
Rank	Team	Qualification
1st place, gold medalist(s)	Australia	2018 World Championship
2nd place, silver medalist(s)	Iran	2018 World Championship
3rd place, bronze medalist(s)	Japan	
4	South Korea	
5	China	
6	Thailand	
7	Iraq	
8	Hong Kong	
9	Chinese Taipei	
10	Kuwait	
11	New Zealand	
12	United Arab Emirates	
13	Saudi Arabia	
14	Afghanistan	

=== Women ===
Rank	Team	Qualification
1st place, gold medalist(s)	China	2018 World Championship
2nd place, silver medalist(s)	Australia	2018 World Championship
3rd place, bronze medalist(s)	Japan	
4	Iran	
