= 2025 IWBF Asia Oceania Championships =

2025 IWBF Asia-Oceania Championships
Tournament information
- Sport: Wheelchair basketball
- Date: November 7–15, 2025
- Host(s): Bangkok, Thailand
- Venue: 1
- Teams: M: 14; W: 9
- Qualifier for: 2026 Wheelchair Basketball World Championships; 2026 Asian Para Games

Final positions
- Champions: M: Australia; W: China
- 1st runners-up: M: Japan; W: Japan
- 2nd runners-up: M: Iran; W: Australia

The 2025 IWBF Asia-Oceania Championship is an international wheelchair basketball tournament for men and women hosted in Bangkok, Thailand from 7 to 15 November 2025.

The games were hosted at Multi-Purpose Hall of the Centara Life Government Complex Hotel and Convention Centre.

The Asia Oceania Wheelchair Basketball Championship served as a qualifiers for the 2026 Wheelchair Basketball World Championships and the 2026 Asian Para Games.

== Men's ==
=== Preliminary round ===
==== Division 1 ====
Pos	Team	Pld	W	L	PF	PA	PD	Pts	Qualification
1	Australia	5	5	0	355	269	+86	10	Quarterfinals
2	Japan	5	4	1	353	224	+129	9	Quarterfinals
3	Iran	5	3	2	337	277	+60	8	Quarterfinals
4	South Korea	5	2	3	290	304	−14	7	Quarterfinals
5	Thailand (H)	5	1	4	259	331	−72	6	Quarterfinals
6	China	5	0	5	184	373	−189	5	Quarterfinals

Source: IWBF
Rules for classification: 1) Points; 2) Head-to-head results; 3) Points difference; 4) Points scored.
(H) Hosts

8 November 2025
12:00

Report

Australia	72–57	Japan

Centara Life Court, Bangkok

8 November 2025
14:00

Report

Iran	89–30	China

Centara Life Court, Bangkok

8 November 2025
16:00

Report

South Korea	70–63	Thailand

Centara Life Court, Bangkok

9 November 2025
14:30

Report

Thailand	43–63	Australia

Centara Life Court, Bangkok

9 November 2025
16:00

Report

China	40–66	South Korea

Centara Life Court, Bangkok

9 November 2025
16:30

Report

Japan	64–46	Iran

Centara Life Court, Bangkok

10 November 2025
12:00

Report

South Korea	50–71	Japan

Centara Life Court, Bangkok

10 November 2025
14:00

Report

Iran	71–79	Australia

Centara Life Court, Bangkok

10 November 2025
16:00

Report

Thailand	69–44	China

Centara Life Court, Bangkok

11 November 2025
10:00

Report

Japan	81–28	Thailand

Centara Life Court, Bangkok

11 November 2025
10:30

Report

Australia	69–42	China

Centara Life Court, Bangkok

11 November 2025
16:00

Report

South Korea	48–58	Iran

Centara Life Court, Bangkok

12 November 2025
12:00

Report

Iran	73–56	Thailand

Centara Life Court, Bangkok

12 November 2025
14:30

Report

South Korea	56–72	Australia

Centara Life Court, Bangkok

12 November 2025
16:00

Report

China	28–80	Japan

Centara Life Court, Bangkok

==== Division 2 ====
The United Arab Emirates withdrew.

===== Group A =====
Pos	Team	Pld	W	L	PF	PA	PD	Pts	Qualification
1	Iraq	3	3	0	210	124	+86	6	Play-off
2	Afghanistan	3	2	1	214	157	+57	5	Play-off
3	New Zealand	3	1	2	184	140	+44	4	11–14th Crossover
4	India	3	0	3	70	257	−187	3	11–14th Crossover

Source: IWBF
Rules for classification: 1) Points; 2) Head-to-head results; 3) Points difference; 4) Points scored.

7 November 2025
18:00

Report

Iraq	84–18	India

Centara Life Court, Bangkok

8 November 2025
10:00

Report

New Zealand	56–63	Afghanistan

Centara Life Court, Bangkok

9 November 2025
14:00

Report

India	26–80	New Zealand

Centara Life Court, Bangkok

10 November 2025
14:30

Report

Afghanistan	93–26	India

Centara Life Court, Bangkok

10 November 2025
16:30

Report

New Zealand	48–51	Iraq

Centara Life Court, Bangkok

11 November 2025
14:30

Report

Iraq	75–58	Afghanistan

Centara Life Court, Bangkok

===== Group B =====
Pos	Team	Pld	W	L	PF	PA	PD	Pts	Qualification
1	Kuwait	3	3	0	160	134	+26	6	Play-off
2	Philippines	3	2	1	152	137	+15	5	Play-off
3	Chinese Taipei	3	1	2	134	133	+1	4	11–14th Crossover
4	Saudi Arabia	3	0	3	123	165	−42	3	11–14th Crossover

Source: IWBF
Rules for classification: 1) Points; 2) Head-to-head results; 3) Points difference; 4) Points scored.

7 November 2025
17:00

Report

Chinese Taipei	38–43	Kuwait

Centara Life Court, Bangkok

8 November 2025
14:30

Report

Saudi Arabia	39–56	Chinese Taipei

Centara Life Court, Bangkok

8 November 2025
18:00

Report

Philippines	47–62	Kuwait

Centara Life Court, Bangkok

9 November 2025
12:30

Report

Philippines	54–35	Saudi Arabia

Centara Life Court, Bangkok

10 November 2025
10:00

Report

Saudi Arabia	49–55	Kuwait

Centara Life Court, Bangkok

10 November 2025
10:30

Report

Philippines	51–40	Chinese Taipei

Centara Life Court, Bangkok

=== Final round ===
==== Divison 2 Playoff and 9th place game ====
Playoff
A1	Iraq	55
B2	Philippines	36
B1	Kuwait	60
A2	Afghanistan	50

Placement (Ninth place)
B2	Philippines	52
A2	Afghanistan	42

===== Divison 2 Playoff =====
12 November 2025
10:30

Report

Iraq	55–36	Philippines

Centara Life Court, Bangkok

12 November 2025
10:00

Report

Kuwait	60–50	Afghanistan

Centara Life Court, Bangkok

===== Ninth place game =====
14 November 2025
12:30

Report

Philippines	52–42	Afghanistan

Centara Life Court, Bangkok

==== 11th–14th bracket ====
From Division 2

Placement (Thirteenth place)
14 November
B4	Saudi Arabia	62
A4	India	39

Consolation (11th–14th)
13 November
A3	New Zealand	71
B4	Saudi Arabia	43
B3	Chinese Taipei	70
A4	India	28

Placement (Eleventh place)
14 November
A3	New Zealand	52
B3	Chinese Taipei	24

===== 11th–14th classification =====
13 November 2025
9:30

Report

New Zealand	71–43	Saudi Arabia

Centara Life Court, Bangkok

13 November 2025
10:00

Report

Chinese Taipei	70–28	India

Centara Life Court, Bangkok

===== Thirteenth place game =====
14 November 2025
10:00

Report

Saudi Arabia	62–39	India

Centara Life Court, Bangkok

===== Eleventh place game =====
14 November 2025
10:30

Report

New Zealand	52–24	Chinese Taipei

Centara Life Court, Bangkok

==== 1st–10th bracket ====
From Division 1 and Division 2 Playoff

Placement (Fifth place)
15 November
5	Thailand	66
P1	Iraq	24
Placement (Seventh place)
6	China	64
P2	Kuwait	34

Consolation (5th–8th)
14 November
6	China	43
P1	Iraq	54
14 November
5	Thailand	63
P2	Kuwait	49

Quarterfinals
13 November
3	Iran	69
6	China	35
13 November
1	Japan	66
P1	Iraq	24
13 November
4	South Korea	71
5	Thailand	49
13 November
2	Australia	101
P2	Kuwait	17

Semifinals
14 November
2	Japan	65
3	Iran	55
14 November
3	Australia	79
4	South Korea	44

Final
15 November
1	Australia	62
2	Japan	57
Bronze medal game
15 November
3	Iran	57
4	South Korea	44

===== Quarterfinals =====
13 November 2025
15:30

Report

Iran	69–35	China

Centara Life Court, Bangkok

13 November 2025
16:00

Report

South Korea	71–49	Thailand

Centara Life Court, Bangkok

13 November 2025
17:30

Report

Australia	101–17	Kuwait

Centara Life Court, Bangkok

13 November 2025
17:30

Report

Japan	66–24	Iraq

Centara Life Court, Bangkok

===== 5th–8th classification =====
14 November 2025
14:30

Report

China	43–54	Iraq

Centara Life Court, Bangkok

14 November 2025
16:30

Report

Thailand	63–49	Kuwait

Centara Life Court, Bangkok

===== Semifinals =====
14 November 2025
12:00

Report

Japan	65–55	Iran

Centara Life Court, Bangkok

14 November 2025
14:00

Report

Australia	79–44	South Korea

Centara Life Court, Bangkok

===== Seventh place game =====
15 November 2025
12:00

Report

China	64–34	Kuwait

Centara Life Court, Bangkok

===== Fifth place game =====
15 November 2025
10:00

Report

Thailand	66–24	Iraq

Centara Life Court, Bangkok

===== Final =====
15 November 2025
16:00

Report

Australia	62–57	Japan

Centara Life Court, Bangkok

== Women's ==
=== Preliminary round ===
==== Division 1 ====
Pos	Team	Pld	W	L	PF	PA	PD	Pts	Qualification
1	China	4	3	1	200	140	+60	7	Semifinals
2	Japan	4	3	1	171	190	−19	7	Semifinals
3	Australia	4	0	4	154	195	−41	4	Semifinals

Source: IWBF
Rules for classification: 1) Points; 2) Head-to-head results; 3) Points difference; 4) Points scored.

8 November 2025
16:30

Report

China	44–51	Japan

Centara Life Court, Bangkok

9 November 2025
12:00

Report

Japan	51–50	Australia

Centara Life Court, Bangkok

10 November 2025
12:30

Report

Australia	32–44	China

Centara Life Court, Bangkok

11 November 2025
12:30

Report

China	56–25	Japan

Centara Life Court, Bangkok

12 November 2025
14:00

Report

Japan	44–40	Australia

Centara Life Court, Bangkok

13 November 2025
13:30

Report

Australia	32–56	China

Centara Life Court, Bangkok

==== Division 2 ====
Pos	Team	Pld	W	L	PF	PA	PD	Pts	Qualification
1	Thailand (H)	5	5	0	378	133	+245	10	Semifinals
2	Cambodia	5	4	1	306	188	+118	9	
3	Iran	5	3	2	288	196	+92	8	
4	Laos	5	2	3	183	268	−85	7	
5	Philippines	5	1	4	118	251	−133	6	
6	India	5	0	5	104	341	−237	5	

Source: IWBF
Rules for classification: 1) Points; 2) Head-to-head results; 3) Points difference; 4) Points scored.
(H) Hosts

7 November 2025
16:00

Report

Thailand	68–14	Philippines

Centara Life Court, Bangkok

8 November 2025
12:30

Report

Philippines	10–60	Iran

Centara Life Court, Bangkok

9 November 2025
10:00

Report

India	25–51	Laos

Centara Life Court, Bangkok

9 November 2025
18:00

Report

Iran	43–58	Cambodia

Centara Life Court, Bangkok

10 November 2025
18:00

Report

India	13–93	Thailand

Centara Life Court, Bangkok

10 November 2025
18:30

Report

Laos	40–67	Cambodia

Centara Life Court, Bangkok

11 November 2025
12:00

Report

Philippines	48–24	India

Centara Life Court, Bangkok

11 November 2025
14:00

Report

Thailand	62–39	Cambodia

Centara Life Court, Bangkok

11 November 2025
16:30

Report

Iran	72–32	Laos

Centara Life Court, Bangkok

12 November 2025
10:00

Report

Cambodia	63–14	Philippines

Centara Life Court, Bangkok

12 November 2025
16:30

Report

Laos	24–72	Thailand

Centara Life Court, Bangkok

12 November 2025
18:00

Report

India	13–70	Iran

Centara Life Court, Bangkok

13 November 2025
11:30

Report

Philippines	32–36	Laos

Centara Life Court, Bangkok

13 November 2025
12:00

Report

Thailand	83–43	Iran

Centara Life Court, Bangkok

13 November 2025
14:00

Report

Cambodia	79–29	India

Centara Life Court, Bangkok

=== Final round ===
Third place
15 November
D1/3	Australia	58
D2/1	Thailand	39

Semifinals
14 November
D1/1	China	59
D2/1	Thailand	24
D1/1	Japan	44
D2/1	Australia	42

Final
15 November
D1/3	China	58
D1/2	Japan	34

==== Semifinals ====
14 November 2025
16:00

Report

China	59–24	Thailand

Centara Life Court, Bangkok

14 November 2025
18:00

Report

Japan	44–42	Australia

Centara Life Court, Bangkok

==== Third place game ====
15 November 2025
11:30

Report

Australia	58–39	Thailand

Centara Life Court, Bangkok

==== Final ====
15 November 2025
14:00

Report

China	58–34	Japan

Centara Life Court, Bangkok

== Final standings ==
=== Men ===
Rank	Team	Qualification
1st place, gold medalist(s)	Australia	2026 World Championships
2nd place, silver medalist(s)	Japan	2026 World Championships and 2026 Asian Para Games
3rd place, bronze medalist(s)	Iran	2026 World Championships and 2026 Asian Para Games
4	South Korea	2026 World Championships and 2026 Asian Para Games
5	Thailand	2026 World Championships and 2026 Asian Para Games
6	Iraq	2026 World Championships and 2026 Asian Para Games
7	China	2026 World Championships and 2026 Asian Para Games
8	Kuwait	2026 World Championships and 2026 Asian Para Games
9	Philippines	2026 World Championships and 2026 Asian Para Games
10	Afghanistan	
11	New Zealand	
12	Chinese Taipei	
13	Saudi Arabia	
14	India	

=== Women ===
Rank	Team	Qualification
1st place, gold medalist(s)	China	2026 World Championships and 2026 Asian Para Games
2nd place, silver medalist(s)	Japan	2026 World Championships and 2026 Asian Para Games
3rd place, bronze medalist(s)	Australia	
4	Thailand	2026 Asian Para Games
5	Cambodia	2026 Asian Para Games
6	Iran	2026 Asian Para Games
7	Laos	2026 Asian Para Games
8	Philippines	
9	India	
