= Wheelchair basketball at the 2022 Asian Para Games =

- Venue: Hangzhou Gymnasium
- Location: Hangzhou, Zhejiang, China
- Dates: 19–27 October 2023
- Nations: 14

Wheelchair basketball was one of the events at the 2022 Asian Para Games, which took place in Hangzhou, Zhejiang, China, from 19 to 27 October 2023.

== Qualification ==
Men's

Means of qualification	Date	Venue	Berths	Qualified
Host nation	—N/a		1	China
Automatic qualification	—N/a		7	Chinese Taipei; Iran; Iraq; Japan; South Korea; Malaysia; Thailand
IWBF Qualifying Tournament	8–13 May 2023	(Thailand) Suphanburi	3	Kuwait; Afghanistan; Philippines

Women's

Means of qualification	Berths	Qualified
Host nation	1	China
Automatic qualification	5	Cambodia; Iran; Japan; Laos; Thailand

== Results ==
=== Men's tournament ===
Men's wheelchair basketball at the 2022 Asian Para Games
- Dates: 19–27 October 2023
- Nations: 10

Medalists
gold medal	Japan
silver medal	South Korea
bronze medal	Iran

==== Preliminary round ====
===== Group A =====
Pos	Team	Pld	W	L	PF	PA	PD	Pts	Qualification
1	Iran	4	4	0	308	157	+151	8	Advance to Semi-finals
2	China (H)	4	3	1	278	207	+71	7	Advance to Semi-finals
3	Thailand	4	2	2	278	207	+71	6	Qualified for classification 5th–8th
4	Afghanistan	4	1	3	172	316	−144	5	Qualified for classification 5th–8th
5	Philippines	4	0	4	147	296	−149	4	Qualified for the Ninth place game

Source: HAPGOC
Rules for classification: 1) Points; 2) Head-to-head results; 3) Points difference; 4) Points scored.
(H) Hosts

19 October
10:30 UTC+8

Report

Iran	91–33	Afghanistan
Scoring by quarter: 26–10, 26–5, 26–6, 13–12

19 October
16:15 UTC+8

Report

China	83–34	Philippines
Scoring by quarter: 14–6, 24–11, 23–13, 22–4

20 October
9:30 UTC+8

Report

China	70–65	Thailand
Scoring by quarter: 15–19, 16–13, 14–17, 25–16

20 October
11:45 UTC+8

Report

Philippines	49–53	Afghanistan
Scoring by quarter: 8–17, 10–13, 15–9, 16–14

21 October
11:00 UTC+8

Report

Iran	72–42	China
Scoring by quarter: 15–15, 20–10, 18–4, 19–13

21 October
11:00 UTC+8

Report

Thailand	70–32	Philippines
Scoring by quarter: 16–16, 18–2, 11–6, 25–8

24 October
10:30 UTC+8

Report

Afghanistan	41–80	Thailand
Scoring by quarter: 8–25, 10–21, 11–19, 12–15

24 October
19:00 UTC+8

Report

Philippines	32–90	Iran
Scoring by quarter: 2–26, 15–26, 10–23, 5–15

25 October
11:45 UTC+8

Report

Thailand	63–74	Iran
Scoring by quarter: 17–20, 10–24, 15–15, 21–15

25 October
14:00 UTC+8

Report

Afghanistan	55–96	China
Scoring by quarter: 11–22, 13–25, 17–21, 14–28

===== Group B =====
Pos	Team	Pld	W	L	PF	PA	PD	Pts	Qualification
1	South Korea	4	4	0	264	121	+143	8	Advance to Semi-finals
2	Japan	4	3	1	313	123	+190	7	Advance to Semi-finals
3	Malaysia	4	1	3	165	258	−93	5	Qualified for classification 5th–8th
4	Chinese Taipei	4	1	3	146	264	−118	5	Qualified for classification 5th–8th
5	Kuwait	4	1	3	162	284	−122	5	Qualified for the Ninth place game

Source: HAPGOC
Rules for classification: 1) Points; 2) Head-to-head results; 3) Points difference; 4) Points scored.

19 October
11:45 UTC+8

Report

Chinese Taipei	21–67	South Korea
Scoring by quarter: 0–22, 9–10, 6–19, 6–16

19 October
15:30 UTC+8

Report

Kuwait	25–92	Japan
Scoring by quarter: 12–25, 0–15, 12–20, 1–32

20 October
16:15 UTC+8

Report

Chinese Taipei	53–52 (OT)	Malaysia
Scoring by quarter: 5–12, 14–13, 15–8, 12–13, Overtime: 7–6

20 October
19:00 UTC+8

Report

South Korea	52–38	Japan
Scoring by quarter: 11–8, 7–12, 19–7, 15–11

21 October
9:00 UTC+8

Report

Kuwait	57–53 (OT)	Chinese Taipei
Scoring by quarter: 14–9, 12–15, 11–16, 12–9, Overtime: 8–4

21 October
9:00 UTC+8

Report

Malaysia	29–63	South Korea
Scoring by quarter: 11–23, 4–18, 6–11, 8–11

24 October
15:30 UTC+8

Report

South Korea	82–33	Kuwait
Scoring by quarter: 25–6, 17–10, 17–8, 23–9

24 October
16:15 UTC+8

Report

Japan	95–27	Malaysia
Scoring by quarter: 25–5, 28–6, 23–10, 19–6

25 October
10:30 UTC+8

Report

Japan	88–19	Chinese Taipei
Scoring by quarter: 17–4, 14–7, 29–4, 28–4

25 October
19:00 UTC+8

Report

Kuwait	47–57	Malaysia
Scoring by quarter: 10–15, 11–18, 14–10, 12–14

==== Final round ====
Semi-finals
26 October – 11:45
Iran	40
Japan	43
26 October – 14:00
South Korea	74
China	39

Gold medal game
27 October – 13:00
Japan	47
South Korea	45
Bronze medal game
27 October – 10:30
Iran	79
China	35

Classification 5–8
26 October – 13:00
Thailand	74
Chinese Taipei	29
26 October – 16:00
Malaysia	65
Afghanistan	64

Classification 5th–6th
27 October – 11:15
Thailand	62
Malaysia	20
Classification 7th–8th
27 October – 9:00
Chinese Taipei	55
Afghanistan	57

===== Ninth place game =====
26 October
9:30 UTC+8

Report

Philippines	54–51	Kuwait
Scoring by quarter: 14–16, 19–15, 10–11, 11–9

===== Classification 5–8 =====
26 October
13:00 UTC+8

Report

Thailand	74–29	Chinese Taipei
Scoring by quarter: 21–5, 20–8, 18–6, 15–10

26 October
16:00 UTC+8

Report

Malaysia	65–64	Afghanistan
Scoring by quarter: 14–21, 19–18, 14–20, 18–5

===== Classification 7th–8th =====
27 October
9:00 UTC+8

Report

Chinese Taipei	55–57	Afghanistan
Scoring by quarter: 17–18, 15–10, 7–16, 16–13

===== Classification 5th–6th =====
27 October
11:15 UTC+8

Report

Thailand	62–20	Malaysia
Scoring by quarter: 9–4, 19–4, 20–8, 14–4

===== Semi-finals =====
26 October
11:45 UTC+8

Report

Iran	40–43	Japan
Scoring by quarter: 7–10, 10–4, 12–12, 11–17

26 October
11:45 UTC+8

Report

South Korea	74–39	China
Scoring by quarter: 22–10, 19–10, 19–7, 14–12

===== Bronze medal game =====
27 October
10:30 UTC+8

Report

Iran	79–35	China
Scoring by quarter: 21–11, 23–10, 19–8, 16–6

===== Gold medal game =====
27 October
13:00 UTC+8

Report

Japan	47–45	South Korea
Scoring by quarter: 12–13, 7–14, 16–11, 12–7

=== Women's tournament ===
Women's wheelchair basketball at the 2022 Asian Para Games
- Dates: 19–26 October 2023
- Nations: 6

Medalists
gold medal	China
silver medal	Japan
bronze medal	Thailand

==== Preliminary round ====
Pos	Team	Pld	W	L	PF	PA	PD	Pts	Qualification
1	China (H)	5	5	0	374	149	+225	10	Gold medal match
2	Japan	5	4	1	381	138	+243	9	Gold medal match
3	Thailand	5	3	2	244	221	+23	8	Bronze medal match
4	Iran	5	2	3	201	277	−76	7	Bronze medal match
5	Cambodia	5	1	4	167	317	−150	6	Qualified for the Fifth place game
6	Laos	5	0	5	123	388	−265	5	Qualified for the Fifth place game

Source: HAPGOC
Rules for classification: 1) Points; 2) Head-to-head results; 3) Points difference; 4) Points scored.
(H) Hosts

19 October
9:30 UTC+8

Report

Laos	35–65	Cambodia
Scoring by quarter: 6–17, 5–17, 14–16, 10–15

19 October
19:00 UTC+8

Report

China	72–23	Thailand
Scoring by quarter: 14–13, 18–5, 19–0, 21–5

19 October
19:00 UTC+8

Report

Iran	16–84	Japan
Scoring by quarter: 4–22, 4–20, 6–16, 2–26

20 October
10:30 UTC+8

Report

Thailand	47–39	Iran
Scoring by quarter: 13–9, 12–6, 14–8, 8–16

20 October
14:00 UTC+8

Report

China	80–38	Laos
Scoring by quarter: 26–4, 20–16, 14–14, 20–4

20 October
15:30 UTC+8

Report

Japan	88–18	Cambodia
Scoring by quarter: 25–2, 26–2, 18–4, 19–10

21 October
13:00 UTC+8

Report

Thailand	40–80	Japan
Scoring by quarter: 8–29, 12–16, 8–15, 12–20

21 October
13:00 UTC+8

Report

Iran	72–29	Laos
Scoring by quarter: 16–11, 16–9, 19–2, 21–7

21 October
15:00 UTC+8

Report

Cambodia	28–88	China
Scoring by quarter: 8–24, 14–22, 0–20, 6–22

24 October
09:30 UTC+8

Report

Laos	16–75	Thailand
Scoring by quarter: 2–22, 9–21, 5–14, 0–18

24 October
11:45 UTC+8

Report

Cambodia	42–47	Iran
Scoring by quarter: 10–7, 14–10, 3–14, 15–16

24 October
14:00 UTC+8

Report

Japan	33–59	China
Scoring by quarter: 8–13, 2–12, 8–18, 15–16

25 October
09:30 UTC+8

Report

China	75–27	Iran
Scoring by quarter: 21–6, 22–9, 16–6, 16–6

25 October
15:30 UTC+8

Report

Japan	96–5	Laos
Scoring by quarter: 25–0, 26–0, 29–3, 16–2

25 October
16:15 UTC+8

Report

Thailand	59–14	Cambodia
Scoring by quarter: 11–0, 14–2, 20–4, 14–8

==== Final round ====
===== Fifth place game =====
27 October
11:15 UTC+8

Report

Cambodia	63–20	Laos
Scoring by quarter: 10–6, 17–6, 24–4, 12–4

===== Bronze medal game =====
26 October
16:30 UTC+8

Report

Thailand	46–31	Iran
Scoring by quarter: 7–9, 9–4, 18–6, 12–12

===== Gold medal game =====
26 October
19:00 UTC+8

Report

China	61–30	Japan
Scoring by quarter: 17–8, 14–13, 14–6, 16–3

== Final standings ==
Men's tournament
Rank	Team	Pld	W	L
1st place, gold medalist(s)	Japan	6	5	1
2nd place, silver medalist(s)	South Korea	6	5	1
3rd place, bronze medalist(s)	Iran	6	5	1
4	China	6	3	3
5	Thailand	6	4	2
6	Malaysia	6	2	4
7	Afghanistan	6	2	4
8	Chinese Taipei	6	1	5
9	Philippines	5	1	4
10	Kuwait	5	1	4

Women's tournament
Rank	Team	Pld	W	L
1st place, gold medalist(s)	China	6	6	0
2nd place, silver medalist(s)	Japan	6	4	2
3rd place, bronze medalist(s)	Thailand	6	4	2
4	Iran	6	2	4
5	Cambodia	6	2	4
6	Laos	6	0	6

== Medalists ==
Event	Gold	Silver	Bronze
Men	Japan (JPN): Akinobu Ito; Shota Horiuchi; Ryohei Miyamoto; Renshi Chokai; Naohiro Murakami; Kei Akita; Yoshinobu Takamatsu; Koki Maruyama; Hiroaki Kozai; Rin Kawahara; Takuya Furusawa; Ryuga Akaishi	South Korea (KOR): Kong Daeyoung; Kim Minseong; Kwak Junseong; Yang Dong Gil; Kim Jihyeok; Lim Dongju; Lee Younjoo; Cho Seunghyun; Lee Chi Won; Kim Sangyeol; Gim Donghyeon; Park Taeho	Iran (IRI): Mohammad Mohammad Nezhad; Hakim Mansouri; Mahdi Abbasishotoriyeh; Mohsen Bigdeli; Mohsen Tolouei Tamardash; Morteza Abedi; Abolfazl Jalaei; Abdoljalil Gharanjik; Amirreza Ahmadi; Omid Hadiazhar; Mohammadhassan Sayari; Vahid Saadatpoormoghadam
Women	China (CHN): Huang Xiaolian; Chen Jingwen; Qiu Qiaoling; Zhang Meimei; Long Yun; Chen Huiqin; He Xiang; Chen Xuejing; Zhang Xuemei; Zhang Tonglei; Lyu Guidi; Lin Suiling	Japan (JPN): Mayo Hagino; Miho Otsu; Yui Ishikawa; Chinami Shimizu; Mari Amimoto; Kotone Usui; Chihiro Furuya; Chihiro Kitada; Izumi Zaima; Amane Yanagimoto; Mayumi Tsuchida; Hotaru Tatsuoka	Thailand (THA): Pimjai Putthanoi; Pornthip Kachunram; Saowalak Nanthasombat; Numthip Jalunporlessin; Tananya Kaewmak; Pawarati Jala; Anurak Sirinikorn; Wikarnda Phewgradang; Nopparat Tanbut; Warisa Thamlaaied; Natnapa Ponin; Nuttaporn Lasopa

Source: HAPGOC

== See also ==
- Basketball at the 2022 Asian Games
