= Wheelchair basketball at the 2008 Summer Paralympics – Women's tournament =

Wheelchair basketball – Women at the XIII Paralympic Games
- Paralympic Wheelchair Basketball
- Venue: Beijing National Indoor Stadium and Beijing Science and Technology University Gymnasium
- Dates: 7 September – 15 September 2008
- Competitors: 120 from 10 nations

Medalists
1st place, gold medalist(s)		United States (USA)
2nd place, silver medalist(s)		Germany (GER)
3rd place, bronze medalist(s)		Australia (AUS)

== Calendar ==
September	7 / 8 / 9 10 / 11	12	13	14	15
Phase	Preliminary; Round	Quarterfinals	Semifinals	Classification 5-8; Placement 9-10	Placement 5-6 & 7-8; Gold Medal Match; Bronze Medal Match

== Preliminary round ==
=== Group A ===
Pos	Team	Pld	W	L	PF	PA	PD	Pts
1	United States (Q)	4	4	0	227	149	+78	8
2	Germany (Q)	4	3	1	214	174	+40	7
3	Australia (Q)	4	2	2	223	185	+38	6
4	Great Britain (Q)	4	1	3	166	194	−28	5
5	Brazil	4	0	4	129	257	−128	4

Source: Paralympic.org
(Q) Qualified for quarterfinals

Note: All times are local

7 September 2008
10:00

Australia	59–30	Great Britain
Scoring by quarter: 24-2, 6-11, 18-4, 11-13
Pts: Cobi Crispin 16; Rebs: Cobi Crispin 8 Asts: Liesl Tesch 4		Pts: Sally Wager, Clare Strange 5 Rebs: Helen Freeman 7 Asts: Helen Freeman, Clare Strange 3

USTB Gymnasium, Beijing
Attendance: 2140
Referees: Bill Kuerzi (USA)

7 September 2008
15:30

Germany	62–32	Brazil
Scoring by quarter: 17-6, 17-6, 16-8, 12-12
Pts: Marina Mohnen 23; Rebs: Maren Butterbrodt 10; Asts: Nicole Seifert 4		Pts: Jucilene Moraes 11; Rebs: Cleonete Reis 11; Asts: Jucilene Moraes 7

USTB Gymnasium, Beijing
Attendance: 2443
Referees: Edwin Frank Wallaart (NED)

8 September 2008
13:30

Brazil	30–66	Australia

National Indoor Stadium, Beijing

8 September 2008
16:15

United States	42–38	Germany

National Indoor Stadium, Beijing

9 September 2008
15:30

Australia	42–61	United States

USTB Gymnasium, Beijing

9 September 2008
17:45

Great Britain	61–29	Brazil

USTB Gymnasium, Beijing

10 September 2008
12:15

United States	56–31	Great Britain

USTB Gymnasium, Beijing

10 September 2008
18:30

Germany	64–56	Australia

National Indoor Stadium, Beijing

11 September 2008
09:00

Brazil	38–68	United States
Scoring by quarter: 6-20, 13-18, 9-13, 10-17
Pts: Jucilene Moraes 16; Rebs: Lia Soares Martins 11; Asts: Jucilene Moraes 5		Pts: Jen Ruddell 16; Rebs: Loraine Gonzales 10; Asts: Christina Ripp 5

National Indoor Stadium, Beijing
Attendance: 7684
Referees: Ziv Radomsky (ISR)

11 September 2008
11:15

Great Britain	44–50	Germany
Scoring by quarter: 8-11, 14-12, 8-15, 14-12
Pts: Clare Strange 12; Rebs: Sally Wager, Helen Turner 7 Asts: Clare Strange, Ann Wild 3		Pts: Marina Mohnen 16; Rebs: Marina Mohnen 10; Asts: Maren Butterbrodt 3

National Indoor Stadium, Beijing
Attendance: 7684
Referees: Matias Quintana (ARG)

=== Group B ===
Pos	Team	Pld	W	L	PF	PA	PD	Pts
1	Japan (Q)	4	4	0	221	181	+40	8
2	Canada (Q)	4	3	1	244	169	+75	7
3	Netherlands (Q)	4	2	2	191	205	−14	6
4	China (Q)	4	1	3	178	199	−21	5
5	Mexico	4	0	4	155	235	−80	4

Source: Paralympic.org
(Q) Qualified for quarterfinals

Note: All times are local

7 September 2008
12:15

Netherlands	59–46	Mexico
Scoring by quarter: 18-11, 11-15, 12-8, 18-12
Pts: Elsbeth van Oostrom 21; Rebs: Elsbeth van Oostrom 12; Asts: Carina Versloot 4		Pts: D. L Vazques 21; Rebs: D. L Vazques 17; Asts: Claudia Magali Miranda 3

USTB Gymnasium, Beijing
Attendance: 2140
Referees: Matthew Brian Wells (AUS)

7 September 2008
17:45

China	46–49	Japan

USTB Gymnasium, Beijing

8 September 2008
09:00

Japan	52–34	Mexico

National Indoor Stadium, Beijing

8 September 2008
11:15

Canada	59–32	Netherlands

National Indoor Stadium, Beijing

9 September 2008
13:30

Mexico	37–53	China

National Indoor Stadium, Beijing

9 September 2008
16:15

Japan	55–52	Canada

National Indoor Stadium, Beijing

10 September 2008
10:00

Netherlands	49–65	Japan
		Pts: Takubo 19, Amimoto 19; Rebs: Amimoto 6

USTB Gymnasium, Beijing

10 September 2008
16:15

Canada	62–44	China

National Indoor Stadium, Beijing

11 September 2008
15:30

Mexico	38–71	Canada
Pts: Janet Mclachlan

USTB Gymnasium, Beijing

11 September 2008
17:45

China	35–51	Netherlands
Scoring by quarter: 10-12, 8-17, 9-12, 8-10
Pts: Qiuping Cao 8 Rebs: Yongqing Fu 11; Asts: Mihuan Liu 3		Pts: Elsbeth van Oostrom 23; Rebs: Inge Huitzing 11; Asts: Roos Oosterbaan 3 & Cher Korver 3

USTB Gymnasium, Beijing
Attendance: 1567
Referees: Rui David Marques (BRA)

== Medal Round ==
Quarterfinals (12 September 2008)
A1	United States	75
B4	China	31
B2	Canada	49
A3	Australia	53
A2	Germany	43
B3	Netherlands	28
B1	Japan	45
A4	Great Britain	38

Semifinals (13 September 2008)
A1	United States	60
A3	Australia	47
A2	Germany	60
B1	Japan	40

Gold medal game (15 September 2008)
A1	United States	50
A2	Germany	38
Bronze medal game
A3	Australia	53
B1	Japan	47

Source: Paralympic.org

Quarterfinals

12 September 2008
13:30

United States	75–31	China
Scoring by quarter: 24-6, 18-6, 18-11, 15-8

National Indoor Stadium, Beijing
Attendance: 8854
Referees: Charles David Saunders (RSA)

12 September 2008
21:15

Canada	49–53	Australia
Scoring by quarter: 10-14, 17-14, 10-12, 12-13

National Indoor Stadium, Beijing
Attendance: 12215
Referees: Juan Manuel Urunuela (ESP)

12 September 2008
19:00

Germany	43–28	Netherlands
Scoring by quarter: 4-4, 17-13, 12-11, 10-0

National Indoor Stadium, Beijing
Attendance: 12215
Referees: Matias Quintana (ARG)

12 September 2008
16:45

Japan	45–38	Great Britain
Scoring by quarter: 9-10, 5-10, 12-6, 19-12

National Indoor Stadium, Beijing
Attendance: 12215
Referees: Matthew Brian Wells (AUS)

Semifinals

13 September 2008
19:00

United States	60–47	Australia
Scoring by quarter: 12-15, 12-7, 14-18, 22-7

National Indoor Stadium, Beijing
Attendance: 12000
Referees: Andre Bosveld (NED)

13 September 2008
21:15

Germany	60–40	Japan
Scoring by quarter: 14-12, 12-10, 8-12, 26-6

National Indoor Stadium, Beijing
Attendance: 12000
Referees: Rui David Marques (BRA)

Bronze medal game

15 September 2008
19:00

Australia	53–47	Japan
Scoring by quarter: 17-10, 14-13, 12-13, 10-11

National Indoor Stadium, Beijing
Attendance: 12000
Referees: Rui David Marques (BRA)

Gold medal game

15 September 2008
21:30

United States	50–38	Germany
Scoring by quarter: 9-12, 14-4, 16-13, 11-9

National Indoor Stadium, Beijing
Attendance: 12000
Referees: Sebastien Gauthier (CAN)

== Classification 5-8 ==
Classification round
14 September 2008
China	46
Canada	53
14 September 2008
Netherlands	46
Great Britain	39

Fifth place
15 September 2008
Canada	61
Netherlands	32
Third place
15 September 2008
China	57
Great Britain	38

Source: Paralympic.org

Classification

14 September 2008
09:00

China	46–53	Canada

National Indoor Stadium, Beijing
Attendance: 12000
Referees: Christopher Gregory (GBR)

14 September 2008
11:15

Netherlands	46–39	Australia

National Indoor Stadium, Beijing
Attendance: 12000
Referees: Adrianos Pavlopoulos (GRE)

Seventh place

15 September 2008
13:30

China	57–38	Great Britain

National Indoor Stadium, Beijing
Attendance: 12000
Referees: Seppo Olavi Viljanen (CZE)

Fifth place

15 September 2008
15:45

Canada	61–32	Netherlands

National Indoor Stadium, Beijing
Attendance: 12000
Referees: Ziv Radomsky (ISR)

== Classification 9-10 ==
14 September 2008
13:30

Brazil	44–54	Mexico
Scoring by quarter: 12-16, 11-8, 12-18, 9-12
Pts: Jucilene Moraes 13; Rebs: Lia Soares Martins 10; Asts: Jucilene Moraes 9		Pts: D. L Vazquez 29; Rebs: D. L Vazquez 9 Asts: D. L Vazquez 7

National Indoor Stadium, Beijing
Attendance: 12000
Referees: Seppo Olavi Viljanen (CZE)

Source: Paralympic.org

== Ranking ==
Place	Team
1st place, gold medalist(s)	United States
2nd place, silver medalist(s)	Germany
3rd place, bronze medalist(s)	Australia
4.	Japan
5.	Canada
6.	Netherlands
7.	China
8.	Great Britain
9.	Mexico
10.	Brazil
