= Philippines men's national wheelchair basketball team =

Philippines
- IWBF zone: IWBF Asia+Oceania
- National federation: Wheelchair Basketball Federation of the Philippines
- Coach: (Philippines) Vernon Perea
- Nickname: Pilipinas Warriors

Paralympic Games
- Appearances: None

World Championships
- Appearances: None

The Philippines men's national wheelchair basketball team is the wheelchair basketball side that represents Philippines in international competitions for men as part of the International Wheelchair Basketball Federation.

== History ==
The Philippines has had a national wheelchair basketball team since at least the 2000s. The country's national team, under the auspices of the Philippine Sports Association for the Differently Abled–National Paralympic Committee (PHILSPADA-NPC), competed in the inaugural edition of the ASEAN Wheelchair Basketball Championship in 2003, finishing in second place.

The Philippines has also competed in the ASEAN Para Games on several occasions, winning a silver medal at the 2005 ASEAN Para Games and bronze medals in the 2014 and 2015 editions.

The Wheelchair Basketball Federation of the Philippines was established in 2019 as part of the Philippine Paralympic Committee's plan to create National Para-Sport Associations (NPSAs), the equivalent of the Philippine Olympic Committee's National Sport Associations (NSAs) for able-bodied sports. The national team participated in the Asia-Oceania qualifiers for the 2020 Summer Paralympics in Thailand, using wheelchairs acquired just days before the tournament. They had planned to compete in the 2020 ASEAN Para Games as hosts, but the event was cancelled due to the COVID-19 pandemic. In the 2022 edition, the team earned a silver medal.

In June 2025, the PHILSPADA entered into a partnership with the Samahang Basketbol ng Pilipinas (SBP), the national sports association for able-bodied basketball. The partnership will last until 2028.

== Current roster ==
The team's current roster as of the 2022 Asian Para Games

Philippines men's national wheelchair basketball team – 2022 Asian Para Games roster
Players
Coaches

No.	Name	Age – Date of birth	Pts.
4	Mark Vincent Aguilar	23 – 23 June 2000	4.0
5	John Rey Escalante	31 – 29 August 1992	4.0
6	Kenneth Christopher Tapia	28 – 5 April 1995	3.5
8	Alfie Cabañog	33 – 20 February 1990	4.0
10	Jannil Cañete	33 – 19 January 1990	1.0
11	Cleford Trocino	36 – 4 May 1987	1.0
12	Marlon Nacita	41 – 24 September 1982	2.0
13	Freddie Magdayo	32 – 20 October 1990	3.5
14	Jefferson Legacion	43 – 13 July 1980	4.0
16	Kyle Carlo Carandang	21 – 29 August 2002	1.5
17	Anthony Aze Demesa	19 – 25 October 2003	3.5
18	Moises Escobar	38 – 4 May 1985	4.0

Head coach

- (Philippines) Vernon Perea

Assistant coach(es)

- (Philippines) Yolanda Hernandez
- (Philippines) Juanito Mingarine
- (Philippines) Harry Solanoy

Legend

- Age – describes age
  on 19 October 2023

== Competitions ==
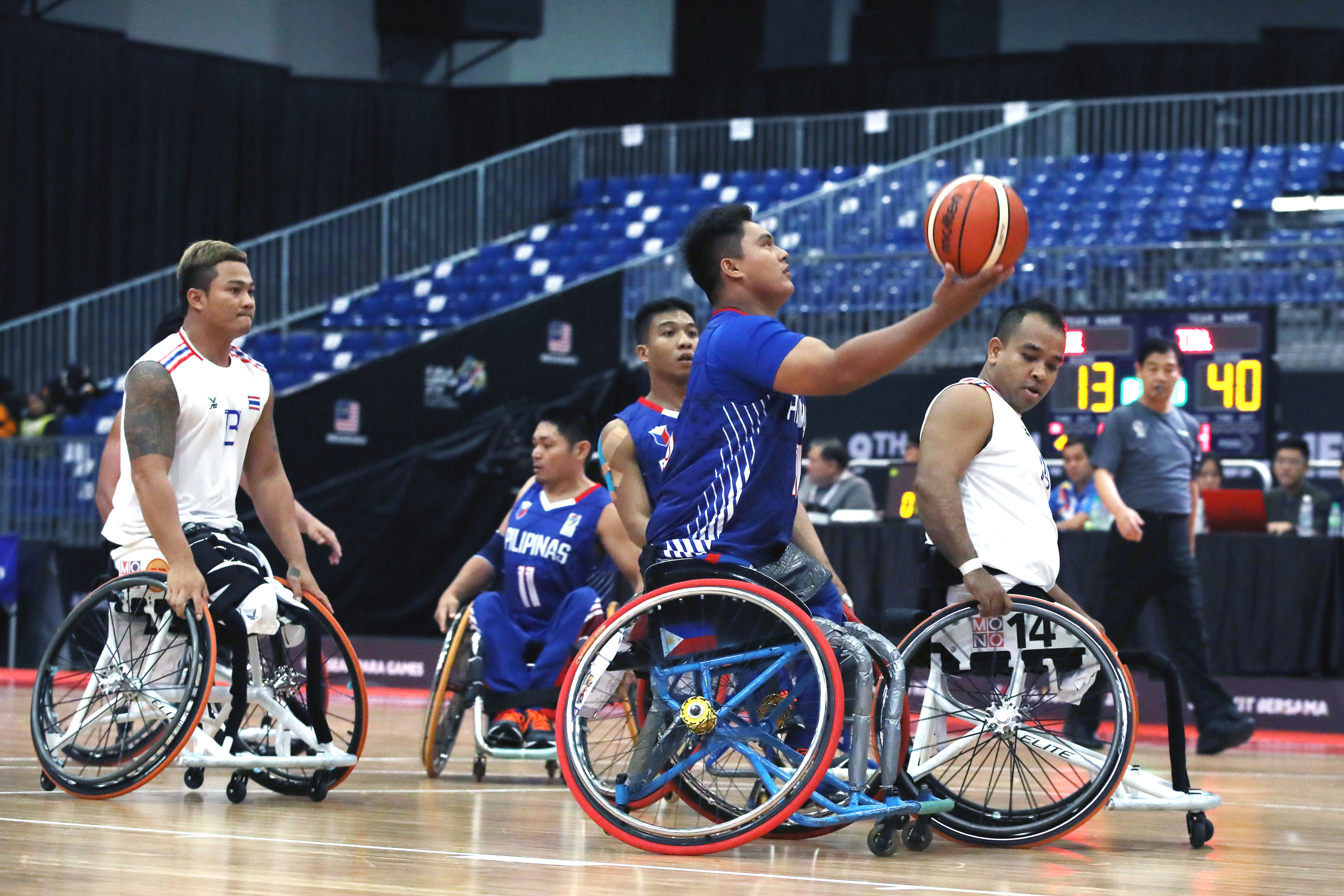
Philippines v. Thailand at the 2017 ASEAN Para Games.

The Philippines men team has not competed at the Wheelchair Basketball World Championship or at the Summer Paralympics.

=== Paralympics ===
Year	Position	W	L
(Brazil) 2016	Did not qualify		
(Japan) 2020	Did not qualify		
(France) 2024	Did not qualify		

=== Asia-Oceania Championship ===
Year	Position	W	L
(Japan) 2015	11th place	1	5
(China) 2017	Did not enter		
(Thailand) 2023	3rd place	4	2
(Thailand) 2024	9th place	2	4
(Thailand) 2025	9th place	3	2

=== Asian Para Games ===
Year	Position	W	L
(China) 2010	Did not participate		
(South Korea) 2014	Did not participate		
(Indonesia) 2018	Did not enter		
(China) 2022	10th place	1	4

=== ASEAN Para Games ===
Year	Position	W	L
(Philippines) 2005	2nd		
(Myanmar) 2014	3rd		
(Singapore) 2015	3rd	2	1
(Malaysia) 2017	3rd		
(Philippines) 2020	Cancelled		
(Indonesia) 2022	2nd	3	2

=== ASEAN Championship ===
Year	Position	W	L
(Singapore) 2003	2nd	3	1

=== Other ===
Year	Position	W	L
2012 Kuwait International Invitational Tournament	5th place		
2013 Kuwait International Invitational Tournament		3	2
