= Wheelchair basketball at the 2020 Summer Paralympics =

Wheelchair basketball at the XVI Paralympic Games
- Wheelchair basketball pictogram of the 2020 Summer Paralympics
- Venue: Musashino Forest Sport Plaza (preliminaries); Ariake Arena (preliminaries, finals)
- Dates: 25 August – 5 September 2021
- Competitors: 264 from 12 (men's) and 10 (women's) nations

Wheelchair basketball at the 2020 Summer Paralympics was held at two venues: Musashino Forest Sport Plaza for group stage rounds and Ariake Arena for group stage and finals.

The 2020 Summer Olympic and Paralympic Games were postponed to 2021 due to the COVID-19 pandemic. They kept the 2020 name and were held from 24 August to 5 September 2021.

== Qualifying ==
There are 12 qualified men's teams and 10 qualified women's teams.

=== Men ===
Means of qualification	Date	Venue	Berths	Qualified
Host country	—N/a	—N/a	1	Japan (JPN)
2019 Parapan American Games	23 August – 1 September 2019	(Peru) Lima	3	United States (USA); Canada (CAN); Colombia (COL)
2019 IWBF Men's European Championship	28 August – 9 September 2019	(Poland) Wałbrzych	4	Germany (GER); Great Britain (GBR); Spain (ESP); Turkey (TUR)
2019 Asia/Oceania Zonal Championships	29 November – 7 December 2019	(Thailand) Pattaya	3	Australia (AUS); Iran (IRI); South Korea (KOR)
2020 African Zonal Championships	1–7 March 2020	(South Africa) Johannesburg	1	Algeria (ALG)
Total			12	

=== Women ===
Means of qualification	Date	Venue	Berths	Qualified
Host country	—N/a	—N/a	1	Japan (JPN)
2019 IWBF Women's European Championship	29 June – 7 July 2019	(Netherlands) Rotterdam	4	Netherlands (NED); Great Britain (GBR); Germany (GER); Spain (ESP)
2019 Parapan American Games	23 August – 1 September 2019	(Peru) Lima	2	Canada (CAN); United States (USA)
2019 Asia/Oceania Zonal Championships	29 November – 7 December 2019	(Thailand) Pattaya	2	Australia (AUS); China (CHN)
2020 African Zonal Championships	1–7 March 2020	(South Africa) Johannesburg	1	Algeria (ALG)
Total			10	

== Competition schedule ==
G	Group stage	¼	Quarter-finals	½	Semi-finals	B	Bronze medal match	F	Final

Date Event	Wed 25 Aug	Thu 26 Aug	Fri 27 Aug	Sat 28 Aug	Sun 29 Aug	Mon 30 Aug	Tue 31 Aug	Wed 1 Sep	Thu 2 Sep	Fri 3 Sep	Sat 4 Sep		Sun 5 Sep	
Men	G	G	G	G	G	G		1/4		1/2			B	F
Women	G	G	G	G	G		1/4		1/2		B	F		

== Medalists ==
Event	Gold	Silver	Bronze
Men's	United States (USA)	Japan (JPN)	Great Britain (GBR)
Women's	Netherlands (NED)	China (CHN)	United States (USA)

== See also ==
- Basketball at the 2020 Summer Olympics
