= China men's national wheelchair basketball team =

China
- IWBF zone: IWBF Asia+Oceania

Paralympic Games
- Appearances: 1 (host nation)

World Championships
- Appearances: 0

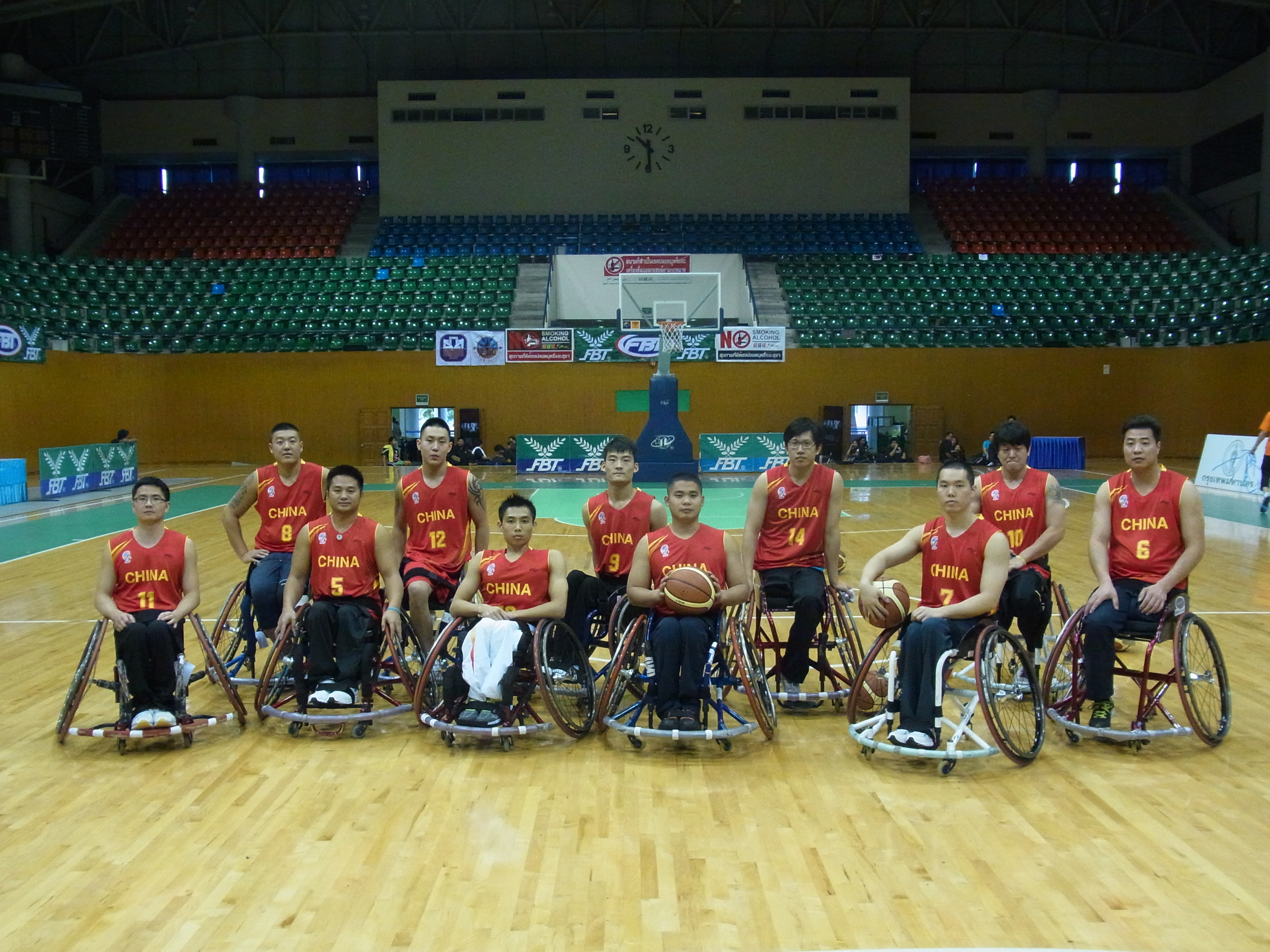
Wheelchair Basketball Asia Oceania Championship 2013

The China men's national wheelchair basketball team is the wheelchair basketball side that represents China in international competitions for men as part of the International Wheelchair Basketball Federation.

== Competitions ==
=== Wheelchair Basketball World Championship ===
Year	Position	W	L
(United Kingdom) 2010	-		
(South Korea) 2014			
Total			

=== Asia Oceania Zone ===
Year	Position	W	L
(South Korea) 2009	-		
(Thailand) 2013			
Total			

2015 IWBF Asia-Oceania Championship

2024 IWBF Asia-Oceania Championships

=== Wheelchair basketball at the Summer Paralympics ===
Year	Position	W	L
(China) 2008	12th		
(United Kingdom) 2012	DNQ		
Total			

=== Asian Para Games ===
Wheelchair Basketball at the Asian Para Games
