= Malaysia men's national wheelchair basketball team =

National sports team

Malaysia
- IWBF zone: IWBF Asia+Oceania

Paralympic Games
- Appearances: 0

World Championships
- Appearances: 0

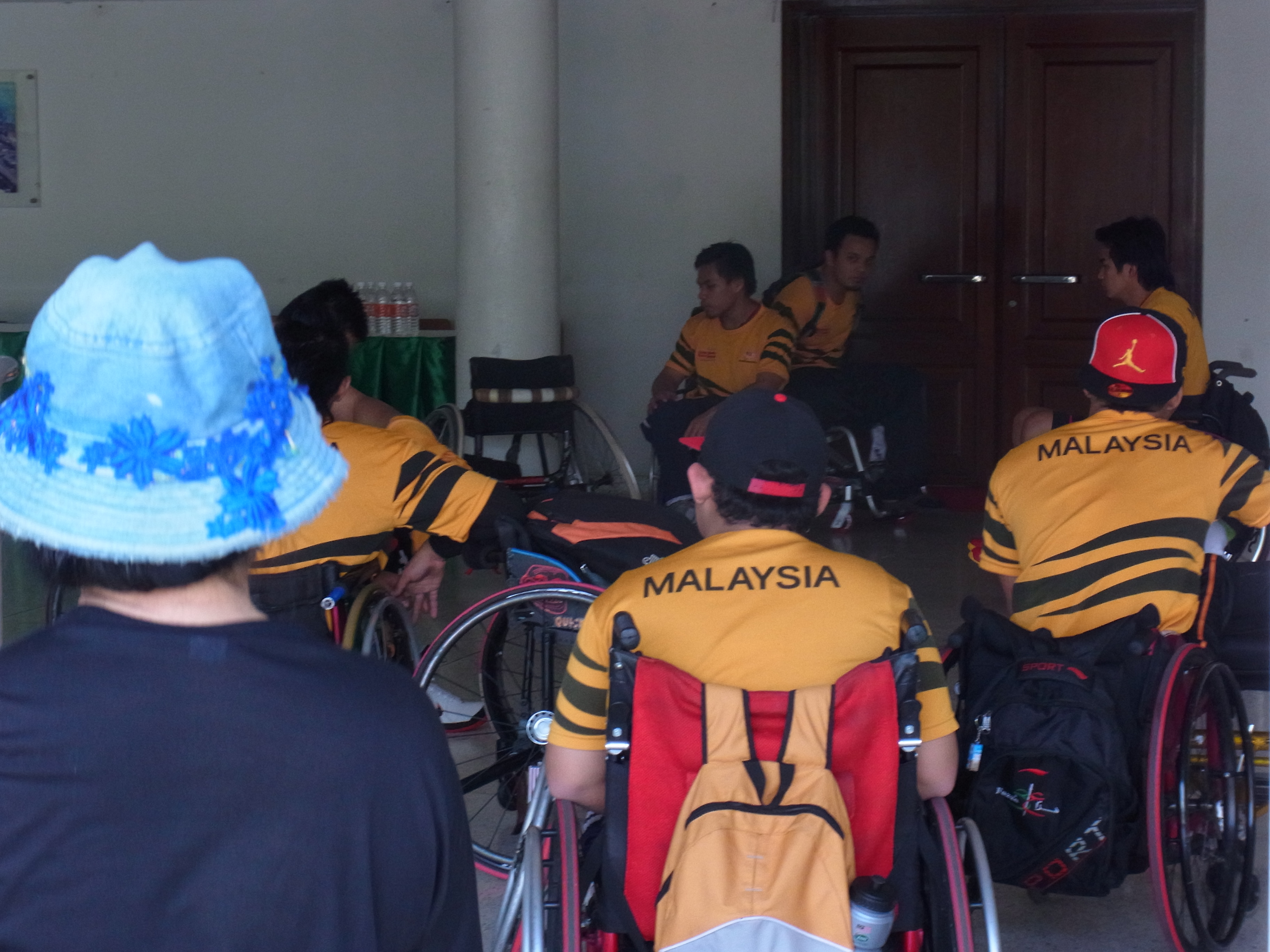
Wheelchair Basketball Asia Oceania Championship 2013

The Malaysia men's national wheelchair basketball team is the wheelchair basketball side that represents Malaysia in international competitions for men as part of the International Wheelchair Basketball Federation.

== Competitions ==
The Malaysia men's team has not competed at the Wheelchair Basketball World Championship or at the Summer Paralympics. They are competing in the 2013 Asia Oceania Zone Championship.

In 2023, they won bronze at the ASEAN Para Games.
