= Thailand women's national wheelchair basketball team =

Thailand
- IWBF zone: IWBF Asia+Oceania
- National federation: Association for Wheelchair Basketball of Thailand

Paralympic Games
- Appearances: 0

World Championships
- Appearances: 0

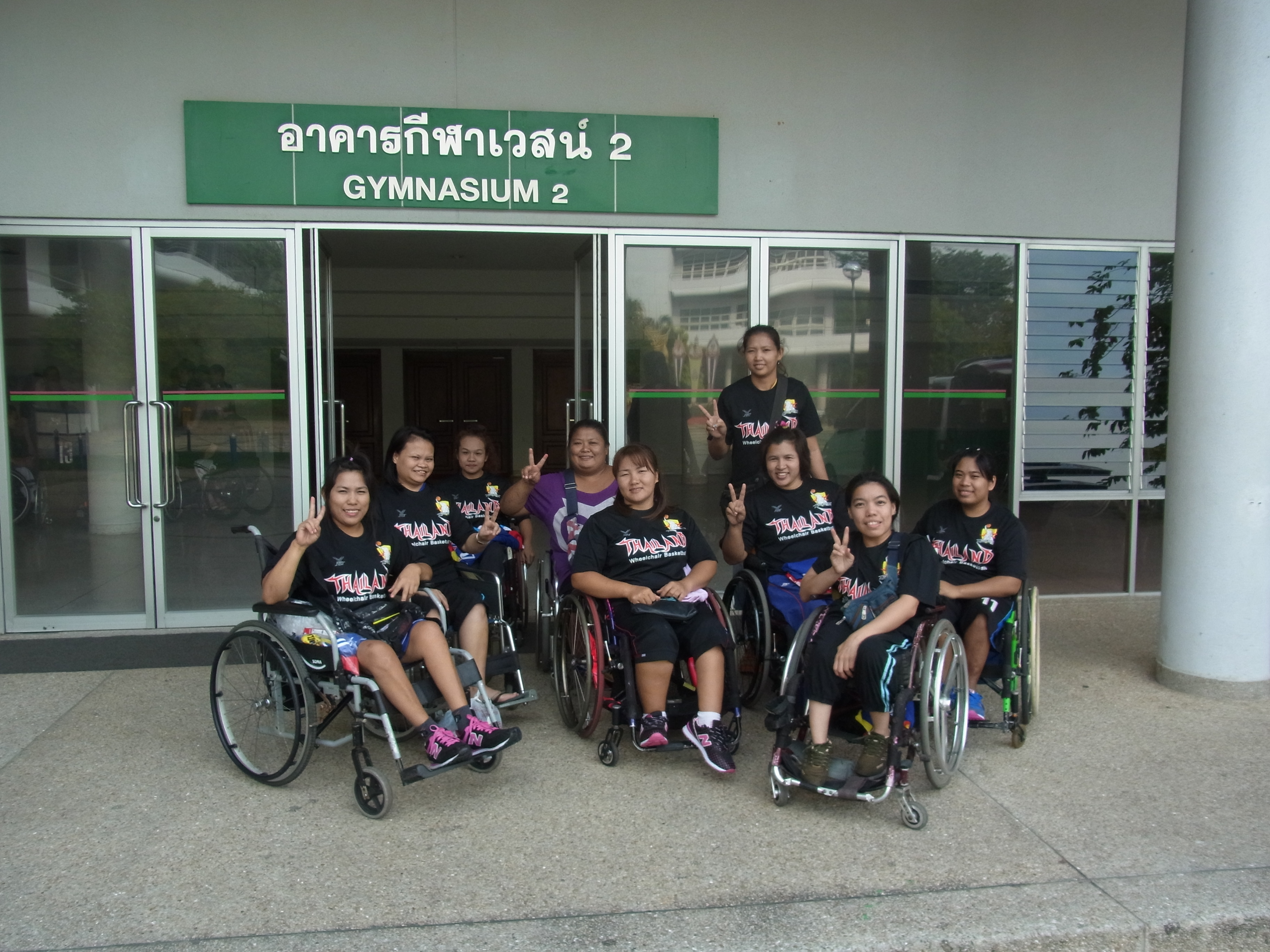
Wheelchair Basketball Asia Oceania Championship 2013

The Thailand women's national wheelchair basketball team is the wheelchair basketball side that represents Thailand in international competitions for women as part of the International Wheelchair Basketball Federation.

== Current roster ==
The team's current roster for the 2014 Wheelchair Basketball World Championship is:

Head coach:

#	Name	Class.
4
5
6
7
8
9
10
11
12
13
14
15

== Competitions ==
The Thai women's team has not competed at the Wheelchair Basketball World Championship or at the Summer Paralympics.

=== Wheelchair Basketball World Championship ===
==== Asia Oceania Zone ====
Year	Position	W	L
(Thailand) 2013			

=== Asian Para Games ===
Year	Position
(China) 2010	3rd place, bronze medalist(s)
(Korea) 2014	did not participate
(Indonesia) 2018	3rd place, bronze medalist(s)
(China) 2022	3rd place, bronze medalist(s)
Total	
