= Thailand men's national wheelchair basketball team =

Thailand
- IWBF zone: IWBF Asia+Oceania
- National federation: Association for Wheelchair Basketball of Thailand

Paralympic Games
- Appearances: 0

World Championships
- Appearances: 1

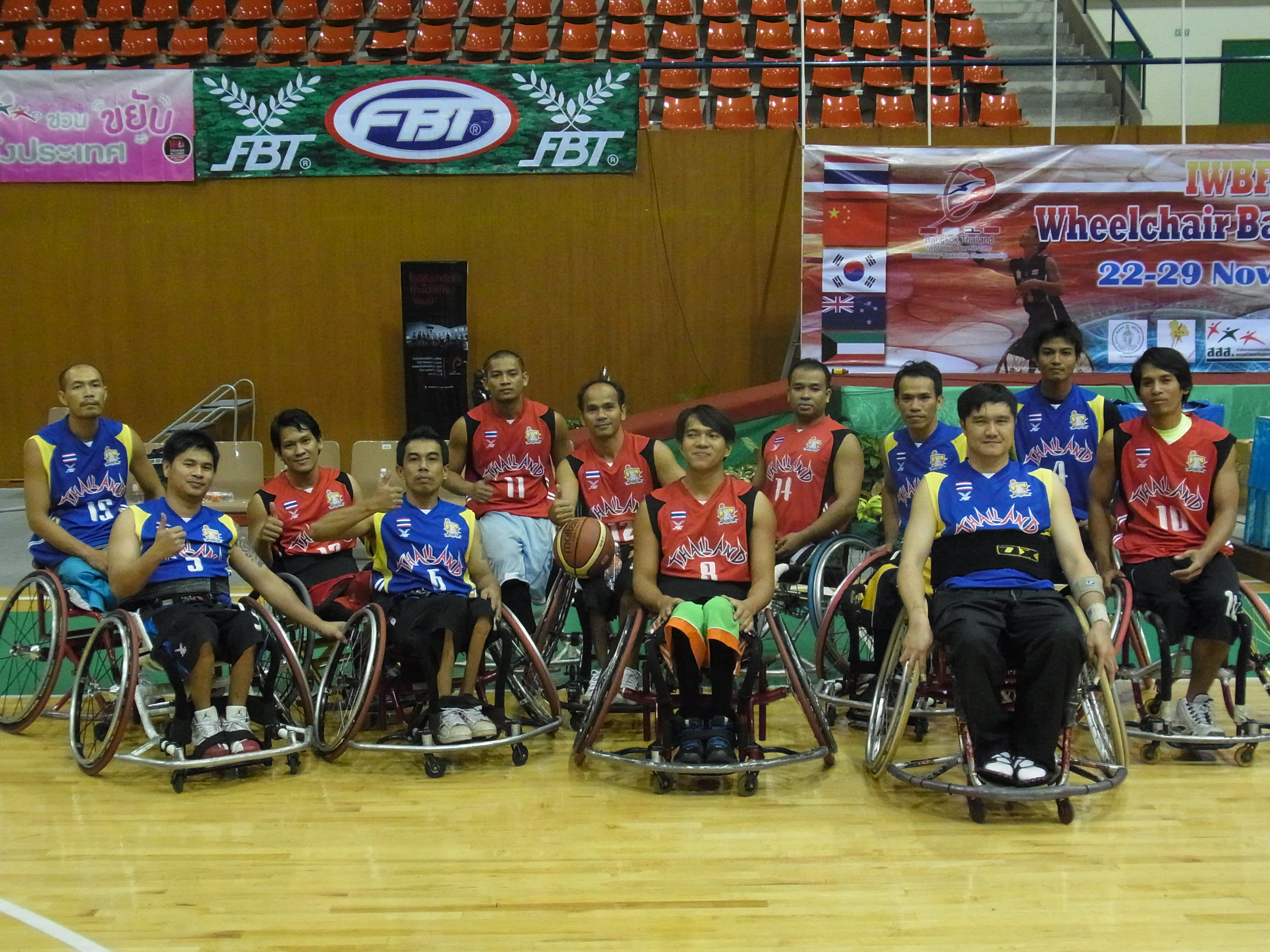
Wheelchair Basketball Asia Oceania Championship 2013

Thailand men's national wheelchair basketball team is the wheelchair basketball side that represents Thailand in international competitions for men, as part of the International Wheelchair Basketball Federation.

== Current roster ==
The team's current roster for the Wheelchair basketball at the 2022 Asian Para Games is:

Head coach: (Iran) Maziyar Mirazimi

#	Name	Class.
4	Kwanchai Pimkorn	3.5
5	Thanakorn Lertanachai	1.0
6	Panpharit Loekhirantrakun	1.5
7	Adisak Kaobua	1.5
8	Teerapong Pasomsap	3.0
9	Jakkapan Jansupin	1.0
10	Sirisak Ruengwongngam	4.5
11	Athin Singdong	4.0
12	Phongsakorn Sripirom	4.0
13	Siriphong Wongsuwoe	3.0
14	Natthakan Chaotrakarn	3.5
15	Aekkasit Jumjarean	4.0

== Competitions ==
The Thai men's team has not competed at the Wheelchair Basketball World Championship or at the Summer Paralympics.

=== Paralympic Games ===
Paralympic Games record
Host / Year	Position	Pld	W	D	L
(Spain) 1992	Not Qualified				
(United States) 1996	Not Qualified				
(Australia) 2000	Not Qualified				
(Greece) 2004	Not Qualified				
(China) 2008	Not Qualified				
(United Kingdom) 2012	Not Qualified				
(Brazil) 2016	Not Qualified				
(Japan) 2020	Not Qualified				
(France) 2024	Not Qualified				
Total	0/9	0	0	0	0

=== ASEAN Para Games ===
ASEAN Para Games record
Host / Year	Position	Pld	W	D	L
(Singapore) 2015	1st place, gold medalist(s)	—			
(Malaysia) 2017	1st place, gold medalist(s)	—			
(Indonesia) 2022	1st place, gold medalist(s)	4	4	0	0
(Cambodia) 2023	1st place, gold medalist(s)	7	7	0	0
(Thailand) 2026	To be determined				
Total	4/4	11	11	0	0

=== ASIAN Para Games ===
ASIAN Para Games record
Host / Year	Position	Pld	W	D	L
(China) 2010	5th place	4	2	0	2
(South Korea) 2014	4th place	6	3	0	3
(Indonesia) 2018	5th place	5	3	0	2
(China) 2022	5th place	6	4	0	2
(Japan) 2026	To be determined				
Total	4/4	15	8	0	7
