= Chinese Taipei men's national wheelchair basketball team =

Chinese Taipei
- IWBF zone: IWBF Asia+Oceania

Paralympic Games
- Appearances: 0

World Championships
- Appearances: 0

The Chinese Taipei men's national wheelchair basketball team is the wheelchair basketball side that represents Taiwan in international competitions for men as part of the International Wheelchair Basketball Federation. At 2011 Asia-Oceania Championship they finished on fourth place.
