= Japan women's national wheelchair basketball team =

Japan
- IWBF zone: IWBF Asia Oceania
- National federation: Japan Wheelchair Basketball Federation (JWBF)

Paralympic Games
- Appearances: 7
- Medals: 2 Bronze

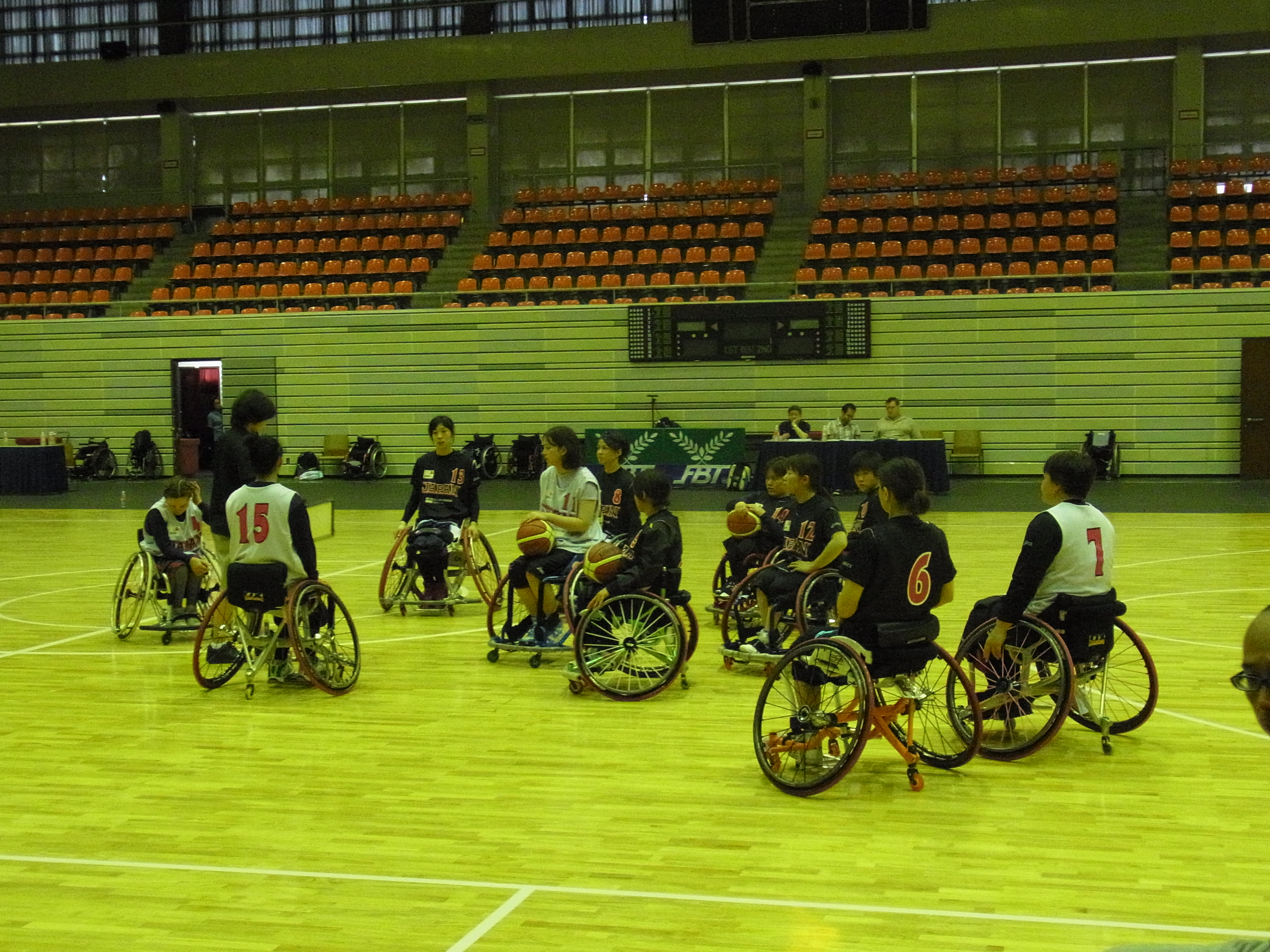
Wheelchair Basketball Asia Oceania Championship 2013

The Japan women's national wheelchair basketball team is the wheelchair basketball side that represents Japan in international competitions for women as part of the International Wheelchair Basketball Federation.

== Current roster ==
The following 12 players named for the Wheelchair basketball at the 2020 Summer Paralympics – Women's tournament.

Head coach: (Japan) Yoshiaki Iwasa

#	Name	Class.
2	Izumi Zaima (財満 いずみ)	1.0
4	Amane Yanagimoto (柳本 あまね)	2.5
5	Miki Hirai (平井 美喜)	2.5
7	Mayumi Tsuchida (土田 真由美)	4.5
10	Mayo Hagino (萩野 真世)	1.5
12	Ikumi Fujii (藤井 郁美)	4.0
14	Chinami Shimizu (清水 千浪)	3.0
15	Mari Amimoto (網本 麻里)	4.5
18	Chihiro Kitada (北田 千尋)	4.5
19	Yui Kitama (北間 優衣)	1.0
22	Emi Yasuo (安尾 笑)	2.0
88	Rie Odajima (小田島 理恵)	2.5

== Competitions ==
=== Wheelchair Basketball World Championship ===
Year	Position	W	L
(France) 1994	7th		
(Australia) 1998	4th		
(Japan) 2002	4th		
(Netherlands) 2006	6th		
(United Kingdom) 2010	7th	2	3
(South Korea) 2014	9th	1	4
Total			

=== Summer Paralympics ===
Japan has entered a wheelchair basketball team into the Summer Paralympics since 1984, when it won bronze defeating Canada, until 2008.

Year	Position	W	L
(United States) / (United Kingdom) 1984	Bronze		
(South Korea) 1988	5th		
(Spain) 1992	6th		
(United States) 1996	5th	3	2
(Australia) 2000	Bronze	3	2
(Greece) 2004	5th	3	3
(China) 2008	4th	5	2
(United Kingdom) 2012	Did not Qualify		
Total			

== See also ==
- Japan men's national wheelchair basketball team
