= South Korea men's national wheelchair basketball team =

South Korea
- IWBF zone: Asia Oceania
- National federation: Korea Wheelchair Basketball Federation

Paralympic Games
- Appearances: 3

World Championships
- Appearances: 4

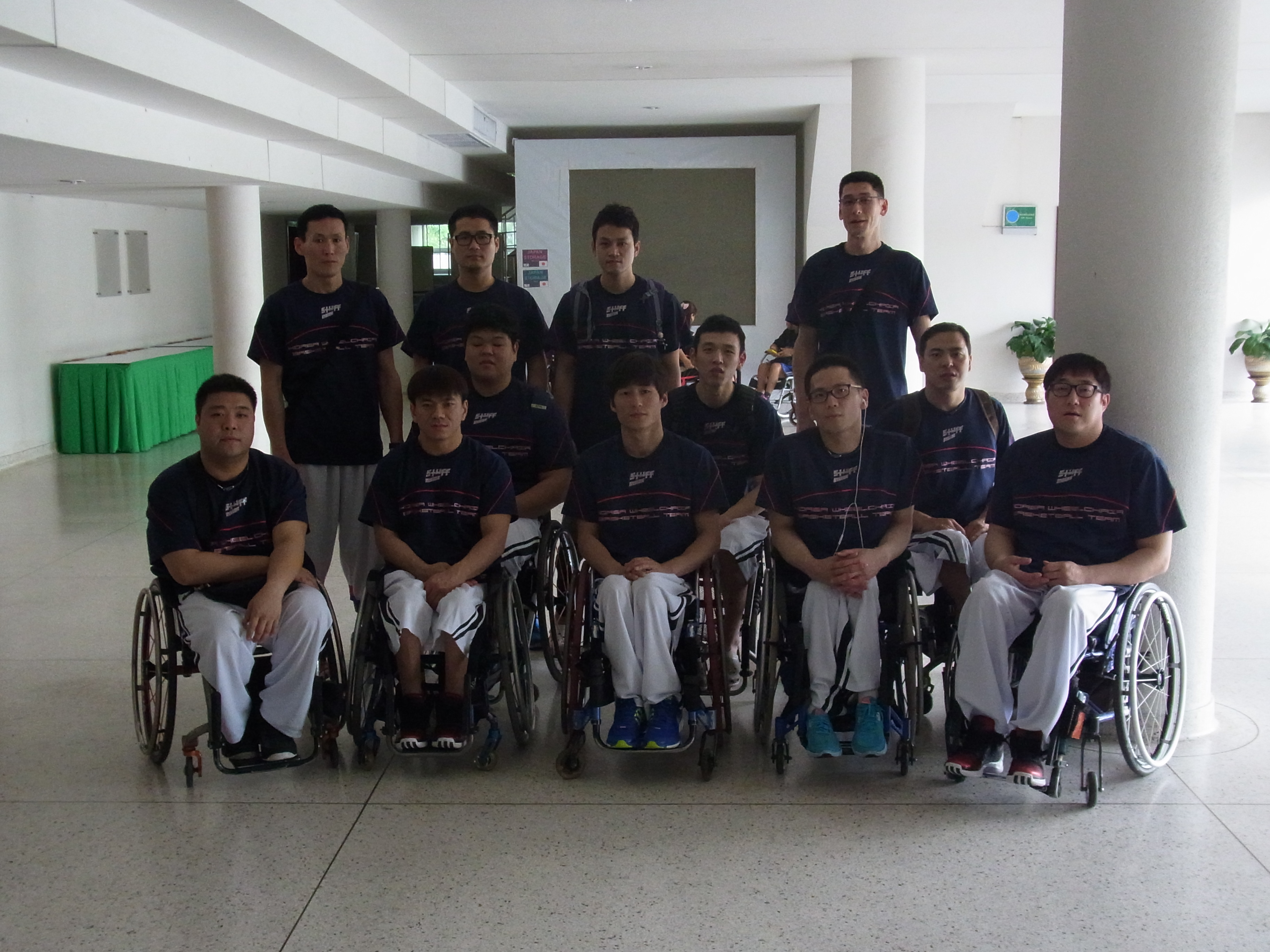
2013 Wheelchair Basketball Asia Oceania Championship

The South Korea men's national wheelchair basketball team is the wheelchair basketball side that represents South Korea in international competitions for men as part of the International Wheelchair Basketball Federation.

== Current roster ==
The team's current roster for the 2018 Wheelchair Basketball World Championship is:

Head coach:Sa Hyun
Assistant coach: Young Moo

#	Name	Class.
5	Woo Sung Hwang	2.0
7	Tam Ok Kim	2.5
10	Dong Suk Oh	2.0
11	Jun Seong Kwak	1.0
12	Dong Gil Yang	4.0
13	Sang Ha Baek	1.0
14	Dong Ju Lim	2.0
16	Youn Joo Lee	3.5
23	Seung Hyun Cho	4.0
28	Dong Hyeon Gim	4.0
32	Hu Suk Han	4.5
44	Byong Jai Lee	1.0

== Competitions ==
=== Wheelchair Basketball World Championship ===
Year	Position	W	L
(United Kingdom) 1998	11th		
(United Kingdom) 2002	11th		
(United Kingdom) 2010	11th	1	6
(South Korea) 2014	6th	4	4
(Germany) 2018	14th	0	5
(United Arab Emirates) 2022	13th	2	3
Total			

=== Summer Paralympics ===
Year	Position	W	L
(South Korea) 1988	16th		
(Spain) 1992	Did not qualify		
(United States) 1996	Did not qualify		
(Australia) 2000	11th	1	6
(Greece) 2004	Did not qualify		
(China) 2008	Did not qualify		
(United Kingdom) 2012	Did not qualify		
(Brazil) 2016	Did not qualify		
(Japan) 2020	10th	1	5
(France) 2024	Did not qualify		
Total			
