= Philippines at the 2025 ASEAN Para Games =

- IPC code: PHI
- NPC: Paralympic Committee of the Philippines

in Nakhon Ratchasima
- Competitors: 211 in 16 sports
- Flag bearers: Jerrold Mangliwan; Alyana Nunez
- Medals Ranked 4th: Gold 45 Silver 37 Bronze 52 Total 134

ASEAN Para Games appearances (overview)
- 2001; 2003; 2005; 2008; 2009; 2011; 2013; 2015; 2017; 2022; 2023; 2025

The Philippines competed at the 2025 ASEAN Para Games in Nakhon Ratchasima, Thailand from 20 to 26 January 2026.

== Multiple medalists ==
Athlete	Sport(s)	Gold	Silver	Bronze	Total
Angel Otom	Swimming	5	1	0	6
Gary Bejino	Swimming	4	2	0	6
Darry Bernardo	Chess	4	0	1	5
Sander Severino	Chess	3	1	0	4
Ernie Gawilan	Swimming	2	1	2	5
Alyana Nuñez	Athletics	2	0	1	3
Cendy Asusano	Athletics	2	1	0	3
Cyril Ongcoy	Athletics	2	0	0	2
Evenizer Celebrado	Athletics	2	0	0	2
Rodrigo Podiotan Jr.	Athletics	2	0	0	2
Ariel Alegarbes	Swimming	1	2	2	5
Kyla Jane Langue	Chess	1	1	2	4
Roland Sabido	Swimming	0	0	3	3

== Medals by sport ==
Sport	Gold	Silver	Bronze	Total
Chess	12	10	9	31
Goalball	0	0	1	1
Para archery	0	0	2	2
Para athletics	16	9	13	38
Para badminton	0	0	1	1
Para cycling (road)	0	1	1	2
Para cycling (track)	0	0	1	1
Para fencing	1	0	3	4
Para judo	0	0	2	2
Para powerlifting	0	4	2	6
Para swimming	13	8	9	30
Para table tennis	1	2	7	10
Ten-pin bowling	2	0	1	3
Wheelchair basketball	0	3	0	3
Total	45	37	45	127

== Medals by gender ==
Gender	Gold	Silver	Bronze	Total
Men	30	25	33	88
Women	13	11	15	39
Mixed	2	1	4	7
Total	45	37	52	134

=== Medal by date ===
Medals by date
Day	Date	1st place, gold medalist(s)	2nd place, silver medalist(s)	3rd place, bronze medalist(s)	Total
1	20 January	Opening Ceremony			
1	21 January	8	7	6	21
2	22 January	7	8	8	23
3	23 January	11	7	13	31
4	24 January	5	2	14	21
5	25 January	14	13	11	38
6	26 January	Closing Ceremony			
Total		45	37	52	134

== Medalists ==
=== Gold ===
No.	Medal	Name	Sport	Event	Date
1	Gold	Gary Bejino	Swimming	Men's 400m freestyle S6	21 January
2	Gold	Ernie Gawilan	Swimming	Men's 400m freestyle S9	21 January
3	Gold	Angel Otom	Swimming	Women's 50m backstroke S4/9	21 January
4	Gold	Jan Jayro Palermo	Athletics	Men's long jump T20	21 January
5	Gold	Marlyn Garrucho	Wheelchair fencing	Women's sabre class A	21 January
6	Gold	Rodrigo Podiotan Jr.	Athletics	Men's 400m T52	21 January
7	Gold	Cendy Asusano	Athletics	Women's shot put F54	21 January
8	Gold	Evenizer Celebrado	Athletics	Men's 1500m T11	21 January
9	Gold	Gary Bejino	Swimming	Men's 200m freestyle S6	22 January
10	Gold	Ernie Gawilan	Swimming	Men's 200m freestyle S7	22 January
11	Gold	Ariel Alegarbes	Swimming	Men's 100m backstroke S14	22 January
12	Gold	Angel Otom	Swimming	Women's 100m freesyyle S4/5	22 January
13	Gold	King James Reyes	Athletics	Men's 1500m T46	22 January
14	Gold	Cyril Ongcoy	Athletics	Men's 1500m T12	22 January
15	Gold	Alyana Nuñez	Athletics	Women's discus throw F11	22 January
16	Gold	Angel Otom	Swimming	Women's 100m backstroke S4/5	23 January
17	Gold	Lhey Manginsay	Table tennis	Women's singles TT9	23 January
18	Gold	Angel Otom	Swimming	Women's 200m freestyle S5	23 January
19	Gold	Arvie Arreglado	Athletics	Men's long jump T47	23 January
20	Gold	Joshua Santos	Athletics	Men's long jump T46	23 January
21	Gold	Jesebel Tordecilla	Athletics	Women's javelin throw F55	23 January
22	Gold	Rodrigo Podiotan Jr.	Athletics	Men's 100m T52	23 January
23	Gold	Sander Severino	Chess	Men's individual standard PI	23 January
24	Gold	Darry Bernardo	Chess	Men's individual standard B2/3	23 January
25	Gold	Darry Bernardo; Menandro Redor; Arman Subaste	Chess	Men's team standard B2/3	23 January
26	Gold	Henry Roger Lopez; Jasper Rom; Sander Severino	Chess	Men's team standard PI	23 January
27	Gold	Marco Tinamisan	Swimming	Men's 50m freestyle S3	24 January
28	Gold	Gary Bejino	Swimming	Men's 50m freestyle S6	24 January
29	Gold	Angel Otom	Swimming	Women's 50m freestyle S4/5	24 January
30	Gold	Alyana Nuñez	Athletics	Women's shot put F11	24 January
31	Gold	Cendy Asusano	Athletics	Women's javelin throw F54	24 January
32	Gold	Evenizer Celbrado	Athletics	Men's 5000m T11	25 January
33	Gold	Cyril Ongcoy	Athletics	Men's 5000m T12	25 January
34	Gold	Gary Bejino	Swimming	Men's 100m freestyle S6	25 January
35	Gold	Cleford Trocino	Athletics	Men's 800m T52	25 January
36	Gold	Francisco Ednaco; Jaime Manginga	Bowling	Mixed doubles TPB8	25 January
37	Gold	Darry Bernardo	Chess	Men's individual rapid B2/3	25 January
38	Gold	Sander Severino	Chess	Men's individual rapid PI	25 January
39	Gold	Darry Bernardo; Menandro Redor; Arman Subaste	Chess	Men's team rapid B2/3	25 January
40	Gold	Kim Ian Chi; Patrick Eusebio	Bowling	Mixed doubles TPB10	25 January
41	Gold	Darry Bernardo	Chess	Men's individual blitz B2/3	25 January
42	Gold	Sander Severino	Chess	Men's individual blitz PI	25 January
43	Gold	Kyla Jane Langue	Chess	Women's individual blitz B1	25 January
44	Gold	Darry Bernardo; Menandro Redor; Arman Subaste	Chess	Men's team blitz B2/3	25 January
45	Gold	Henry Roger Lopez; Jasper Rom; Sander Severino	Chess	Men's team blitz PI	25 January

=== Silver ===
No.	Medal	Name	Sport	Event	Date
1	Silver	Rhebilyn Aniban; Patricia Camille Castro; Jean Delos Reyes; Lorna Lilagan; Cecelia Wells	Wheelchair basketball	Women's 3x3 tournament	21 January
2	Silver	Alfie Cabañog; Jannil Canete; Fel Lander Dawal; Anthony Aze Demeza; Kenneth Christopher Tapia	Wheelchair basketball	Men's 3x3 tournament	21 January
3	Silver	Marydol Pamati-an	Powerlifting	Women's 41kg	21 January
4	Silver	Gary Bejino; Angel Otom; Beariza Roble; Marco Tinamisan	Swimming	Mixed 4x50m freestyle relay 20 points	21 January
5	Silver	Jesebel Tordecilla	Athletics	Women's discus throw F55	21 January
6	Silver	Arman Dino	Athletics	Men's 200m T47	21 January
7	Silver	Jerrold Mangliwan	Athletics	Men's 400m T52	21 January
8	Silver	Marco Tinamisan	Swimming	Men's 200m freestle S3/4	22 January
9	Silver	Patrick Gerard Lee	Cycling	Men's road race C3/5	22 January
10	Silver	Gary Bejino	Swimming	Men's 50m butterfly S6	22 January
11	Silver	Jules Empizo	Powerlifting	Men's 54 kg	22 January
12	Silver	Evaristo Carbonel	Athletics	Men's discus throw F11	22 January
13	Silver	Arvie Arreglado	Athletics	Men's 100m T47	22 January
14	Silver	Cendy Asusano	Athletics	Women's discus throw F54	22 January
15	Silver	Rocky Logroño	Athletics	Men's shot put F40	22 January
16	Silver	Ernie Gawilan	Swimming	Men's 100m freestyle S7	23 January
17	Silver	Jan Redulla	Table tennis	Men's singles TT8	23 January
18	Silver	Jhona Peña	Table tennis	Women's singles TT6/7	23 January
19	Silver	Ariel Alegarbes	Swimming	Men's 100m butterfly S14	23 January
20	Silver	Cleford Trocino	Athletics	Men's 100m T52	23 January
21	Silver	Jasper Jom	Chess	Men's individual standard PI	23 January
22	Silver	Kyla Jane Langue	Chess	Women's individual standard B1	23 January
23	Silver	Ariel Alegarbes	Swimming	Men's 200m backstroke S14	24 January
24	Silver	Katrina Marie Hernandez	Powerlifting	Women's 86kg	24 January
25	Silver	Marco Tinamisan	Swimming	Men's 100m freestyle S4	25 January
26	Silver	Jerrold Mangliwan	Athletics	Men's 800m T52	25 January
27	Silver	Muhaimin Ulag	Swimming	Men's 50m breaststroke SB9	25 January
28	Silver	Jeffrey Jaramillo	Powerlifting	Men's 97kg	25 January
29	Silver	Cheyzer Mendoza	Chess	Women's individual rapid PI	25 January
30	Silver	Henry Roger Lopez; Jasper Rom; Sander Severino	Chess	Men's team rapid PI	25 January
31	Silver	Cecilio Bilog; Francis Ching; Rodolfo Sarmiento	Chess	Men's team rapid B1	25 January
32	Silver	Mark Vincent Aguilar; Alfie Cabañog; Jannil Canete; Kyle Carlo Carandang; Fel Lander Dawal; Anthony Aze Demeza; John Rey Escalante; Miko Esperanza; Freddie Magdayo; Edgardo Ochaves; Jodriel Paolo Piol; Kenneth Christopher Tapia	Wheelchair basketball	Men's 5x5 tournament	25 January
33	Silver	Henry Roger Lopez	Chess	Men's individual blitz PI	25 January
34	Silver	Cheryl Angot	Chess	Women's individual blitz PI	25 January
35	Silver	Menandro Redor	Chess	Men's individual blitz B2/3	25 January
36	Silver	Evangeline Gamao; Kyla Jane Langue; Maria Katrina Mangawang	Chess	Women's team blitz B1	25 January
37	Silver	Cheryl Angot; Cheyzer Mendoza; Jean Lee Nacita	Chess	Women's team blitz PI	25 January

=== Bronze ===
No.	Medal	Name	Sport	Event	Date
1	Bronze	Michael Bayani	Cycling	Men's individual time trial C3/5	21 January
2	Bronze	Francisco Ednaco	Bowling	Men's single event TPB8	21 January
3	Bronze	Denesia Esnara	Powerlifting	Women's 55 kg	21 January
4	Bronze	Prudencia Panaligan	Athletics	Women's discus throw F55	21 January
5	Bronze	Roldan Sagan	Athletics	Men's 1500m T11	21 January
6	Bronze	Vengie Aurelio	Athletics	Men's javelin throw F54	21 January
7	Bronze	Roland Sabido	Swimming	Men's 200m freestyle S8/9	22 January
8	Bronze	Achelle Guion	Powerlifting	Women's 50 kg	22 January
9	Bronze	Alyana Nuñez	Athletics	Women's long jump T11	22 January
10	Bronze	Kendrews Granaderos	Judo	Men's individual 64kg J1	22 January
11	Bronze	Joel Balacutan	Athletics	Men's javelin throw F55	22 January
12	Bronze	Arman Dino	Athletics	Men's 100m T47	22 January
13	Bronze	Jan Jayro Palermo	Athletics	Men's 400m T20	22 January
14	Bronze	Marlyn Garrucho	Wheelchair fencing	Women's épeé class A	22 January
15	Bronze	Ariel Alegarbes	Swimming	Men's 200m individual medley SM14	23 January
16	Bronze	Racleo Martinez Jr.	Table tennis	Men's singles TT4	23 January
17	Bronze	Leo Macalanda	Table tennis	Men's singles TT6	23 January
18	Bronze	Kevin Arandia	Table tennis	Men's singles TT8	23 January
19	Bronze	Prudencia Panaligan	Athletics	Women's javelin throw F55	23 January
20	Bronze	Rocky Logroño	Athletics	Men's javelin throw F40	23 January
21	Bronze	King James Reyes	Athletics	Men's 400m T46	23 January
22	Bronze	Vengie Aurelio	Athletics	Men's discus throw F53/54	23 January
23	Bronze	Edmond Montecillo	Judo	Men's individual J1 – 70 kg	23 January
24	Bronze	Cheyzer Mendoza	Chess	Women's individual standard PI	23 January
25	Bronze	Arman Subaste	Chess	Men's individual standard B2/3	23 January
26	Bronze	Cheryl Angot; Cheyzer Mendoza; Jean Lee Nacita	Chess	Women's team standard PI	23 January
27	Bronze	Evangeline Gamao; Kyla Jane Langue; Maria Katrina Mangawang	Chess	Women's team standard B1	23 January
28	Bronze	Roland Sabido	Swimming	Men's 400m freestyle S9	24 January
29	Bronze	Claire Calizo	Swimming	Women's 400m freestyle S14	24 January
30	Bronze	Ernie Gawilan	Swimming	Men's 50m butterfly S7	24 January
31	Bronze	Ernie Gawilan	Swimming	Men's 200m individual medley SM7/8	24 January
32	Bronze	Agustina Bantiloc	Archery	Women's individual compound	24 January
33	Bronze	Roland Sabido	Swimming	Men's 200m backstroke S9/10	24 January
34	Bronze	Muhaimin Ulag	Swimming	Men's 100m breaststroke SB9	24 January
35	Bronze	Agustina Bantiloc; Elizabeth Bayla	Archery	Women's doubles compound	24 January
36	Bronze	Arvie Arreglado	Athletics	Men's triple jump T47	24 January
37	Bronze	Wilfredo Bugayong II; Allen Coycoen; Marlyn Garrucho; Violeta Sapalit	Wheelchair fencing	Mixed team épeé	24 January
38	Bronze	Wilfredo Bugayong II; Allen Coycoen; Marlyn Garrucho; Violeta Sapalit	Wheelchair fencing	Mixed team sabre	24 January
39	Bronze	Lhey Manginsay; Jan Redulla	Table tennis	Mixed doubles TT17	24 January
40	Bronze	Noriko Batuhan; Smith Billy Cartera	Table tennis	Mixed doubles TT7	24 January
41	Bronze	Kathleen Pedrosa	Badminton	Women's singles SL4	24 January
42	Bronze	Ariel Alegarbes	Swimming	Men's 400m individual medley SM14	25 January
43	Bronze	Jesebel Tordecilla	Athletics	Women's shot put F55	25 January
44	Bronze	Akinna Castuli; Angela Angelica Coronel; Shayra Erum; Fionna Mariey Lorena; Erica Valencia; Sheryl Valencia	Goalball	Women's team	25 January
45	Bronze	Francis Ching	Chess	Men's individual rapid B1	25 January
46	Bronze	Kyla Jane Langue	Chess	Women's individual rapid B1	25 January
47	Bronze	Evangeline Gamao; Kyla Jane Langue; Maria Katrina Mangawang	Chess	Women's team rapid B1	25 January
48	Bronze	Cheryl Angot; Cheyzer Mendoza; Jean Lee Nacita	Chess	Women's team rapid PI	25 January
49	Bronze	Grygo Bolinas	Cycling	Men's 3000m individual pursuit C1/3	25 January
50	Bronze	Smith Billy Cartera; Racleo Martinez Jr.	Table tennis	Men's doubles TT8	25 January
51	Bronze	Leo Macalanda; Ramces Tuala	Table tennis	Men's doubles TT14	25 January
52	Bronze	Jasper Rom	Chess	Men's individual blitz PI	25 January

== Competitors ==
The following is the list of the number of competitors participating at the Games per sport/discipline.

Sport	Men	Women	Total
Archery	6	5	11
Athletics	26	9	35
Badminton	5	3	8
Boccia	4	2	6
Bowling	11	0	11
Chess	9	9	18
CP football	10	0	10
Cycling	6	1	7
Goalball	6	6	12
Judo	3	1	4
Powerlifting	5	7	12
Sitting volleyball	13	0	13
Swimming	10	4	14
Table tennis	13	8	21
Wheelchair basketball	12	11	23
Wheelchair fencing	3	3	6
Total	142	69	211

== Archery ==
=== Compound ===
Athlete	Event	Ranking Round		Round of 16	Quarterfinals	Semifinals	Final / BM	Rank
Athlete	Event	Total Score	Rank	Opposition Score	Opposition Score	Opposition Score	Opposition Score	Rank
Arthur Azcuna	Men's individual	629	11 Q	Govinda Rajan (MAS); L 134–135	Did not advance			
Marzel Burgos	Men's individual	672	4 Q	Phạm Q.T. (VIE); W 139–121	Wantawee (THA); W 142–137	Swagumilang (INA); L 130–144	Firmansyah (INA) –	
Angelo Manangdang	Men's individual	652	10 Q	Julin (MAS); W 138–136	Firmansyah (INA); L 137–144	Did not advance		
Agustina Bantiloc	Women's individual	646	5 Q	Kaemkaew (THA); W 136–102	Huỳnh T.H. (VIE); W 136–128	Alim (SGP); L 138–145	Biện T.C. (VIE) –	
Elizabeth Bayla	Women's individual	615	8 Q	Khuthawisap (THA); L 110–126	Did not advance			
Dina Manangdang	Women's individual	556	10 Q	Srathongmaew (THA); L 116–136	Did not advance			
Arthur Azcuna; Marzel Burgos; Angelo Manangdang	Men's doubles	1324	4 Q	—N/a	Nguyễn N.H. Phạm Q.T. (VIE); W 138–134	Firmansyah; Swagumilang (INA); L 142–154	Phiarthanee; Singpirom; Wantawee (THA) –	
Agustina Bantiloc; Elizabeth Bayla; Dina Manangdang	Women's doubles	1261	2 Q	—N/a		Kaemkaew; Khuthawisap; Srathongmaew (THA); L 129–131	Ferelly; Wulandari (INA) –	
Arthur Azcuna; Elizabeth Bayla	Mixed team	1,318	2 Q	—N/a	Bye	Singpirom; Srathongmaew (THA); L 147–151	Ferelly; Ken Swagumilang (INA) –	

=== Recurve ===
Athlete	Event	Ranking Round		Round of 16	Quarterfinals	Semifinals	Final / BM	Rank
Athlete	Event	Total Score	Rank	Opposition Score	Opposition Score	Opposition Score	Opposition Score	Rank
Michael Gorospe	Men's individual	481	13 Q	bin Mat (MAS); L 1–7	Did not advance			
Keith Vincent Gramaje	Men's individual	559	9 Q	Trần V.Q. (VIE); L 0–6	Did not advance			
Giovanni Ola	Men's individual	551	11 Q	Netsiri (THA); L 3–7	Did not advance			
Jannah Kate Ballesta	Women's individual	77	11 Q	Anada (INA); L 0–6	Did not advance			
Jamie Kathryn Monterde	Women's individual	359	10 Q	Nguyễn T.H. (VIE); L 2–6	Did not advance			
Michael Gorospe; Keith Vincent Gramaje; Giovanni Ola	Men's doubles	1110	5 Q	—N/a	Netsiri; Phimthong; Prasoet (THA); W 5–3	Anwar; Kholidin; Setiawan (INA); L 0–6	Lý C. Trấn V.Q. (VIE); L 0-6	4
Jamie Kathryn Monterde; Giovanni Ola	Mixed team	918	5 Q	—N/a	Lý C. Nguyễn T.T. (VIE); L 2–6	Did not advance		

== Chess ==
=== Men's ===
==== Standard ====
Individual

Athlete	Class	Round 1	Round 2	Round 3	Round 4	Round 5	Round 6	Final Score	Rank
Cecilio Bilog	B1	Kaung (MYA); L 0–1	Chimyam (THA); L 0–1	Bye; W 1–0	Ching (PHI); L 0–1	Oo (MYA); W 1–0	Wongbunchailert (THA); W 1–0	3.0	13
Francis Ching	B1	Wongbunchailert (THA); D 0.5–0.5	Myo (MYA); L 0–1	Sarmiento (PHI); W 1–0	Bilog (PHI); W 1–0	Kaung (MYA); L 0–1	Muhammad (MAS); W 1–0	3.5	8
Rodolfo Sarmiento	B1	Fitriyanto (INA); L 0–1	Mohammed (MAS); L 0–1	Ching (PHI); L 0–1	Chimyam (THA); W 1–0	da Costa (TLS); W 1–0	Bye; W 1–0	3.0	12
Darry Bernardo	B2/3	Trịnh H.Đ. (VIE); W 1–0	Subaste (PHI); W 1–0	Satrio (INA); W 1–0	Hartono (INA); D 0.5–0.5	Redor (PHI); W 1–0	Phạm L.A.K. (VIE); W 1–0	5.5	1st place, gold medalist(s)
Menandro Redor	B2/3	Min (MYA); W 1–0	Hartono (INA); L 0–1	Cortereal (TLS); W 1–0	Trịnh H.Đ. (VIE); D 0.5–0.5	Bernardo (PHI); L 0–1	Maw (MYA); W 1–0	3.5	6
Arman Subaste	B2/3	Phạm L.A.K. (VIE); W 1–0	Bernardo (PHI); L 0–1	Hartono (INA); D 0.5–0.5	Maw (MYA); W 1–0	Trịnh H.Đ. (VIE); W 1–0	Satrio (INA); D 0.5–0.5	4.0	3rd place, bronze medalist(s)
Henry Roger Lopez	PI	de Araujo (TLS); W 1–0	Severino (PHI); L 0–1	Alamsyah (INA); D 0.5–0.5	Mongkoltawephun (THA); W 1–0	Dương H.V. (VIE); W 1–0	Rom (PHI); L 0–1	3.5	4
Jasper Rom	PI	Khoonmee (THA); W 1–0	Nguyễn V.Q. (VIE); W 1–0	Severino (PHI); L 0–1	Dương H.V. (VIE); D 0.5–0.5	Firdaus (INA); W 1–0	Lopez (PHI); W 1–0	4.5	3rd place, bronze medalist(s)
Sander Severino	PI	Dương H.V. (VIE); W 1–0	Lopez (PHI); W 1–0	Rom (PHI); W 1–0	Firdaus (INA); D 0.5–0.5	Alamsyah (INA); W 1–0	Panjaitan (INA); W 1–0	5.5	1st place, gold medalist(s)

Team

Athlete	Class	Final Score	Rank
Francis Ching; Rodolfo Sarmiento	B1	6.5	5
Darry Bernardo; Arman Subaste	B2/3	9.5	1st place, gold medalist(s)
Henry Roger Lopez; Jasper Rom; Sander Severino	PI	13.5	1st place, gold medalist(s)

==== Rapid ====
Individual

Athlete	Class	Round 1	Round 2	Round 3	Round 4	Round 5	Round 6	Final Score	Rank
Cecilio Bilog	B1								
Francis Ching	B1								
Rodolfo Sarmiento	B1								
Darry Bernardo	B2/3								
Menandro Redor	B2/3								
Henry Roger Lopez	PI								
Sander Severino	PI								

Team

Athlete	Class	Final Score	Rank
Cecilio Bilog; Francis Ching; Rodolfo Sarmiento	B1		
Darry Bernardo; Menandro Redor	B2/3		
Henry Roger Lopez; Sander Severino	PI		

==== Blitz ====
Individual

Athlete	Class	Round 1	Round 2	Round 3	Round 4	Round 5	Round 6	Final Score	Rank
Cecilio Bilog	B1								
Francis Ching	B1								
Rodolfo Sarmiento	B1								
Darry Bernardo	B2/3								
Menandro Redor	B2/3								
Arman Subaste	B2/3								
Henry Roger Lopez	PI								
Jasper Rom	PI								
Sander Severino	PI								

Team

Athlete	Class	Final Score	Rank
Cecilio Bilog; Francis Ching; Rodolfo Sarmiento	B1		
Darry Bernardo; Menandro Redor; Arman Subaste	B2/3		
Henry Roger Lopez; Jasper Rom; Sander Severino	PI		

=== Women's ===
==== Standard ====
Individual

Athlete	Class	Round 1	Round 2	Round 3	Round 4	Round 5	Round 6	Final Score	Rank
Evangeline Gamao	B1	Phạm T.H. (VIE); L 0–1	Si (MYA); L 0–1	Bye; W 1–0	Ramadani (INA); L 0–1	Kaveevorayan (THA); L 0–1	Pengsee (THA); W 1–0	2.0	13
Kyla Jane Langue	B1	Kaveevorayan (THA); W 1–0	Magwang (PHI); W 1–0	Phạm T.H. (VIE); W 1–0	Ariesta (INA); W 1–0	Trần N.L. (VIE); L 0–1	Sinaga (INA); W 1–0	5.0	2nd place, silver medalist(s)
Maria Katrina Mangawang	B1	Nan (MYA); L 1–0	Langue (PHI); L 0–1	Si (MYA); W 1–0	Trần N.L. (VIE); L 0–1	Ramadani (INA); L 0–1	Su (MYA); W 1–0	3.0	8
Maria Teresa Bilog	B2/3	Nguyễn T.H. (VIE); L 0–1	Tonic (PHI); W 1–0	Phyo (MYA); W 1–0	Budiarti (INA); L 0–1	Halil (MAS); L 0–1	Botkate (THA); L 0–1	2.0	13
Corazon Lucero	B2/3	Budiarti (INA); L 0–1	Nar (MYA); L 0–1	Gusmão (TLS); W 1–0	Nguyễn T.M.L. (VIE); L 0–1	Khuijanthuek (THA); L 0–1	Tonic (PHI); W 1–0	2.0	15
Charmaine Tonic	B2/3	Halil (MAS); L 0–1	Bilog (PHI); L 0–1	Lin (MYA); L 0–1	Phyo (MYA); L 0–1	Gusmão (TLS); W 1–0	Lucero (PHI); L 0–1	1.0	17
Cheryl Angot	PI	Mendoza (PHI); L 0–1	Herna (INA); L 0–1	Nguyễn T.K. (VIE); W 1–0	Yindeekitkoson (THA); W 1–0	Punbua (THA); W 1–0	Trần T.B.T. (VIE); D 0.5–0.5	3.5	5
Cheyzer Mendoza	PI	Angot (PHI); W 1–0	Simanja (INA); W 1–0	Đoàn T.H. (VIE); L 0–1	Herna (INA); L 0–1	Trần T.B.T. (VIE); W 1–0	Nacita (PHI); W 1–0	4.0	3rd place, bronze medalist(s)
Jean Lee Nacita	PI	Trần T.B.T. (VIE); L 0–1	Rojwongsawat (THA); W 1–0	de Araujo (TLS); W 1–0	Simanja (INA); L 0–1	Bye; W 1–0	Mendoza (PHI); L 0–1	3.0	7

Team

Athlete	Class	Final Score	Rank
Kyla Jane Langue; Ma. Katrina Mangawang	B1	8.0	3rd place, bronze medalist(s)
Maria Teresa Bilog; Corazon Lucero	B2/3	4.0	6
Cheryl Angot; Cheyzer Mendoza; Jean Lee Nacita	PI	10.5	3rd place, bronze medalist(s)

==== Rapid ====
Individual

Athlete	Class	Round 1	Round 2	Round 3	Round 4	Round 5	Round 6	Final Score	Rank
Evangeline Gamao	B1								
Kyla Jane Langue	B1								
Maria Teresa Bilog	B2/3								
Corazon Lucero	B2/3								
Charmaine Tonic	B2/3								
Cheryl Angot	PI								
Cheyzer Mendoza	PI								
Jean Lee Nacita	PI								

Team

Athlete	Class	Final Score	Rank
Evangeline Gamao; Kyla Jane Langue	B1		
Maria Teresa Bilog; Corazon Lucero; Charmaine Tonic	B2/3		
Cheryl Angot; Cheyzer Mendoza; Jean Lee Nacita	PI		

==== Blitz ====
Individual

Athlete	Class	Round 1	Round 2	Round 3	Round 4	Round 5	Round 6	Final Score	Rank
Evangeline Gamao	B1								
Kyla Jane Langue	B1								
Ma. Katrina Mangawang	B1								
Maria Teresa Bilog	B2/3								
Corazon Lucero	B2/3								
Charmaine Tonic	B2/3								
Cheryl Angot	PI								
Cheyzer Mendoza	PI								
Jean Lee Nacita	PI								

Team

Athlete	Class	Final Score	Rank
Evangeline Gamao; Kyla Jane Langue; Ma. Katrina Mangawang	B1		
Maria Teresa Bilog; Corazon Lucero; Charmaine Tonic	B2/3		
Cheryl Angot; Cheyzer Mendoza; Jean Lee Nacita	PI		

== CP Football ==
Team	Event	Group Stage				Semifinals / PF	Final / BM / PF	
Team	Event	Opposition Score	Opposition Score	Opposition Score	Rank	Opposition Score	Opposition Score	Rank
Philippines men's	Men's tournament	Thailand; L 0–19	Indonesia; L 1–15	Myanmar; L 0–22	Malaysia -			

== Wheelchair basketball ==
=== 3x3 ===
Team	Event	Group Stage					Semifinals	Final / BM	
Team	Event	Opposition Score	Opposition Score	Opposition Score	Opposition Score	Rank	Opposition Score	Opposition Score	Rank
Philippines men's	Men's tournament	Indonesia; W 20–3	Malaysia; W 11–7	Thailand; L 12–19	—N/a	2 Q	Malaysia; W 13–11	Thailand; L 13–20	2nd place, silver medalist(s)
Philippines women's	Women's tournament	Thailand; L 2–14	Laos; L 5–8	Thailand; L 3–14	Laos; W 8–4	2 Q	—N/a	Thailand; L 5–12	2nd place, silver medalist(s)

Group stage – Men's tournament

Pos	Team	Pld	W	L	PF	PA	PD	Pts	Qualification
1	Thailand (H)	3	3	0	49	26	+23	6	Semifinals
2	Philippines	3	2	1	43	29	+14	5	Semifinals
3	Malaysia	3	1	2	25	31	−6	4	Semifinals
4	Indonesia	3	0	3	15	46	−31	3	Semifinals

Source: Thailand 2025
Rules for classification: 1) Points; 2) Head-to-head results; 3) Points difference; 4) Points scored.
(H) Hosts

19 January 2026
10:30

Report

Indonesia	3–20	Philippines

4th floor Hall 1,Terminal 21 Kora, Nakhon Ratchasima

19 January 2026
11:30

Report

Philippines	11–7	Malaysia

4th floor Hall 1,Terminal 21 Kora, Nakhon Ratchasima

19 January 2026
14:30

Report

Philippines	12–19	Thailand

4th floor Hall 1,Terminal 21 Kora, Nakhon Ratchasima

Semifinals

19 January 2026
16:00

Report

Philippines	13–11	Malaysia

4th floor Hall 1,Terminal 21 Kora, Nakhon Ratchasima

Gold medal match

21 January 2026
11:00

Report

Thailand	20–13	Philippines

4th floor Hall 1,Terminal 21 Kora, Nakhon Ratchasima

Group stage – Women's tournament

Pos	Team	Pld	W	L	PF	PA	PD	Pts	Qualification
1	Thailand (H)	4	4	0	58	11	+47	8	Gold medal match
2	Philippines	4	1	3	18	40	−22	5	Gold medal match
3	Laos	4	1	3	18	43	−25	5	

Source: Thailand 2025
Rules for classification: 1) Points; 2) Head-to-head results; 3) Points difference; 4) Points scored.
(H) Hosts

19 January 2026
11:00

Report

Philippines	2–14	Thailand

4th floor Hall 1,Terminal 21 Kora, Nakhon Ratchasima

19 January 2026
12:00

Report

Philippines	5–8	Laos

4th floor Hall 1,Terminal 21 Kora, Nakhon Ratchasima

19 January 2026
14:30

Report

Philippines	3–14	Thailand

4th floor Hall 1,Terminal 21 Kora, Nakhon Ratchasima

19 January 2026
15:30

Report

Philippines	8–4	Laos

4th floor Hall 1,Terminal 21 Kora, Nakhon Ratchasima

Gold medal match

21 January 2026
10:00

Report

Thailand	12–5	Philippines

4th floor Hall 1,Terminal 21 Kora, Nakhon Ratchasima

=== 5x5 ===
Team	Event	Group Stage					Semifinals	Final / BM	
Team	Event	Opposition Score	Opposition Score	Opposition Score	Opposition Score	Rank	Opposition Score	Opposition Score	Rank
Philippines men's	Men's tournament	Indonesia; W 63–30	Malaysia –	Thailand –	—N/a				
Philippines women's	Women's tournament	Thailand; L 21–78	Laos –	Thailand –	Laos –		—N/a		

Group stage – Men's tournament

Pos	Team	Pld	W	L	PF	PA	PD	Pts	Qualification
1	Thailand (H)	3	3	0	208	108	+100	6	Semifinals
2	Philippines	3	2	1	162	157	+5	5	Semifinals
3	Malaysia	3	1	2	172	160	+12	4	Semifinals
4	Indonesia	3	0	3	86	203	−117	3	Semifinals

Source: Thailand 2025
Rules for classification: 1) Points; 2) Head-to-head results; 3) Points difference; 4) Points scored.
(H) Hosts

21 January 2026
14:30

Report

Indonesia	30–63	Philippines
Scoring by quarter: 8–18, 8–10, 10–18, 4–17

4th floor Hall 1,Terminal 21 Kora, Nakhon Ratchasima

22 January 2026
10:00

Report

Malaysia	52–61	Philippines
Scoring by quarter: 10–16, 14–19, 14–8, 14–18

4th floor Hall 1,Terminal 21 Kora, Nakhon Ratchasima

23 January 2026
10:00

Report

Thailand	75–38	Philippines
Scoring by quarter: 17–10, 22–9, 19–8, 17–11

4th floor Hall 1,Terminal 21 Kora, Nakhon Ratchasima

Group stage – Women's tournament

Pos	Team	Pld	W	L	PF	PA	PD	Pts	Qualification
1	Thailand (H)	4	4	0	277	89	+188	8	Gold medal match
2	Laos	4	2	2	146	183	−37	6	Gold medal match
3	Philippines	4	0	4	84	235	−151	4	

Source: Thailand 2025
Rules for classification: 1) Points; 2) Head-to-head results; 3) Points difference; 4) Points scored.
(H) Hosts

21 January 2026
16:30

Report

Philippines	21–78	Thailand
Scoring by quarter: 2–25, 4–27, 7–16, 8–10

4th floor Hall 1,Terminal 21 Kora, Nakhon Ratchasima

22 January 2026
10:30

Report

Philippines	20–55	Laos
Scoring by quarter: 7–14, 3–18, 6–15, 4–8

4th floor Hall 1,Terminal 21 Kora, Nakhon Ratchasima

23 January 2026
15:30

Report

Philippines	13–66	Thailand
Scoring by quarter: 2–23, 0–16, 4–12, 7–15

4th floor Hall 1,Terminal 21 Kora, Nakhon Ratchasima

24 January 2026
15:00

Report

Philippines	30–36	Laos
Scoring by quarter: 2–10, 12–9, 6–12, 8–5

4th floor Hall 1,Terminal 21 Kora, Nakhon Ratchasima
