= Wheelchair fencing at the 2025 ASEAN Para Games =

- Venue: MCC Hall, The Mall Lifestore Korat, Nakhon Ratchasima, Thailand
- Dates: 21–24 January 2026
- Competitors: 54 from 6 nations

Wheelchair fencing at the 2025 ASEAN Para Games was held at the MCC Hall, The Mall Lifestore Korat in Nakhon Ratchasima, Thailand from 21 to 24 January 2026. This marked the first time the sport was contested at the ASEAN Para Games since 2008.

== Participating nations ==
6 nations competed in wheelchair fencing.

- Indonesia (8)
- Laos (8)
- Malaysia (8)
- Philippines (6)
- Thailand (20)
- Vietnam (4)

== Medal summary ==
* Host nation (Thailand)

| Rank | Nation | Gold | Silver | Bronze | Total |
|---|---|---|---|---|---|
| 1 | Thailand (THA)* | 10 | 10 | 5 | 25 |
| 2 | Malaysia (MAS) | 2 | 0 | 5 | 7 |
| 3 | Indonesia (INA) | 1 | 4 | 12 | 17 |
| 4 | Laos (LAO) | 1 | 0 | 3 | 4 |
| 4 | Philippines (PHI) | 1 | 0 | 3 | 4 |
| 6 | Vietnam (VIE) | 0 | 1 | 2 | 3 |
| Totals (6 entries) | | 15 | 15 | 30 | 60 |

== Medalists ==
=== Men's events ===
| Event | Class | Gold | Silver | Bronze |
|---|---|---|---|---|
| Individual épée | A | Krisana Sriujun; Malaysia | Waroot Kaveekat; Thailand | Didit Diantoro; Indonesia |
| Individual épée | A | Krisana Sriujun; Malaysia | Waroot Kaveekat; Thailand | Korakod Sangsawang; Thailand |
| Individual épée | B | Visit Kingmanaw; Thailand | Sudsakorn Sawaengmee; Thailand | Salermxay Xayyasith; Laos |
| Individual épée | B | Visit Kingmanaw; Thailand | Sudsakorn Sawaengmee; Thailand | Firdaus Shukor; Malaysia |
| Individual foil | A | Akhmad Saidah; Indonesia | Phoopa Saesim; Thailand | Taufiq Rahman; Indonesia |
| Individual foil | A | Akhmad Saidah; Indonesia | Phoopa Saesim; Thailand | Kitsada Pakdee; Thailand |
| Individual foil | B | Chitiphat Charoenta; Thailand | Anwa Wae; Thailand | Ryo Afandi; Indonesia |
| Individual foil | B | Chitiphat Charoenta; Thailand | Anwa Wae; Thailand | Firdaus Shukor; Malaysia |
| Individual sabre | A | Krisana Sriujun; Malaysia | Boonsiri Sanitmuanwai; Thailand | Taufiq Rahman; Indonesia |
| Individual sabre | A | Krisana Sriujun; Malaysia | Boonsiri Sanitmuanwai; Thailand | Didit Diantoro; Indonesia |
| Individual sabre | B | Salermxay Xayyasith; Laos | Witsawakon Siphuthon; Thailand | Teerapat Khulpisal; Thailand |
| Individual sabre | B | Salermxay Xayyasith; Laos | Witsawakon Siphuthon; Thailand | Ryo Afandi; Indonesia |

=== Women's events ===
| Event | Class | Gold | Silver | Bronze |
|---|---|---|---|---|
| Individual épée | A | Duean Nakprasit; Thailand | Arrirat Saisin; Thailand | Marlyn Garrucho; Philippines |
| Individual épée | A | Duean Nakprasit; Thailand | Arrirat Saisin; Thailand | Sri Lestari; Indonesia |
| Individual épée | B | Chintanakon Seepak; Thailand | Panadda Srithong; Thailand | Nur Hidayah Badaruddin; Malaysia |
| Individual épée | B | Chintanakon Seepak; Thailand | Panadda Srithong; Thailand | Niken; Indonesia |
| Individual foil | A | Thitirat Pengprasittipong; Thailand | Suthin Sita; Thailand | Vilayphone Khammekoun; Laos |
| Individual foil | A | Thitirat Pengprasittipong; Thailand | Suthin Sita; Thailand | Dwi Lestari; Indonesia |
| Individual foil | B | Saysunee Jana; Thailand | Trương Thị Vân Anh; Vietnam | Elih; Indonesia |
| Individual foil | B | Saysunee Jana; Thailand | Trương Thị Vân Anh; Vietnam | Nguyễn Thị Lệ Quyên; Vietnam |
| Individual sabre | A | Marlyn Garrucho; Philippines | Thitirat Pengprasittipong; Thailand | Sri Lestari; Indonesia |
| Individual sabre | A | Marlyn Garrucho; Philippines | Thitirat Pengprasittipong; Thailand | Duean Nakprasit; Thailand |
| Individual sabre | B | Saysunee Jana; Thailand | Niken; Indonesia | Wanwisa Singtothong; Thailand |
| Individual sabre | B | Saysunee Jana; Thailand | Niken; Indonesia | Elih; Indonesia |

=== Mixed events ===
| Event | Class | Gold | Silver | Bronze |
|---|---|---|---|---|
| Team épée | A–B | Thailand; Saysunee Jana; Visit Kingmanaw; Duean Nakprasit; Kitsada Pakdee | Indonesia; Ryo Afandi; Didit Diantoro; Niken; Sri Lestari | Philippines; Wilfredo Bugayong II; Allen Coycoen; Marlyn Garrucho; Violeta Sapalit |
| Team épée | A–B | Thailand; Saysunee Jana; Visit Kingmanaw; Duean Nakprasit; Kitsada Pakdee | Indonesia; Ryo Afandi; Didit Diantoro; Niken; Sri Lestari | Vietnam; Đình Trương Giang; Huỳnh Công Sơn; Nguyễn Thị Lệ Quyên; Trương Thị Vân Anh |
| Team foil | A–B | Thailand; Visit Kingmanaw; Thitirat Pengprasittipong; Boonsiri Sanitmuanwai; Wanwisa Singtothong | Indonesia; Ryo Afandi; Elih; Dwi Lestari; Akhmad Saidah | Laos; Sounthone Hongkham; Vilayphone Khammekoun; Bounmy Somthala; Salermxay Xayyasith |
| Team foil | A–B | Thailand; Visit Kingmanaw; Thitirat Pengprasittipong; Boonsiri Sanitmuanwai; Wanwisa Singtothong | Indonesia; Ryo Afandi; Elih; Dwi Lestari; Akhmad Saidah | Malaysia; Nur Hidayah Badaruddin; Noazizan Mohamad; Nurul Khalijah Mohd Azlan Shah; Firdaus Shukor |
| Team sabre | A–B | Thailand; Chitiphat Charouenta; Thitirat Pengprasittipong; Chintanakon Seepak; Boonsiri Sanitmuanwai | Indonesia; Ryo Afandi; Elih; Sri Lestari; Taufiq Rahman | Malaysia; Nur Hidayah Badaruddin; Mohamad Dinihakimi Nordin; Nurul Khalijah Mohd Azlan Shah; Krisana Sriujun |
| Team sabre | A–B | Thailand; Chitiphat Charouenta; Thitirat Pengprasittipong; Chintanakon Seepak; Boonsiri Sanitmuanwai | Indonesia; Ryo Afandi; Elih; Sri Lestari; Taufiq Rahman | Philippines; Wilfredo Bugayong II; Allen Coycoen; Marlyn Garrucho; Violeta Sapalit |

== Results ==
=== Men's ===
==== Individual épée ====
Class A

Round of 16
Wilfredo Bugayong II (PHI) | 12
Noazizan Mohamad (MAS) | 15
Akhmad Saidah (INA) | 15
Huỳnh Công Sơn (VIE) | 10

Quarterfinals
Krisana Sriujun (MAS) | 15
Noazizan Mohamad (MAS) | 8
Didit Diantoro (INA) | 15
Andy Avellana (PHI) | 10
Korakod Sangsawang (THA) | 15
Olam Norkham (LAO) | 8
Akhmad Saidah (INA) | 6
Waroot Kaveekat (THA) | 15

Semifinals
Krisana Sriujun (MAS) | 15
Didit Diantoro (INA) | 12
Korakod Sangsawang (THA) | 13
Waroot Kaveekat (THA) | 15

Final
Krisana Sriujun (MAS) | 15
Waroot Kaveekat (THA) | 12

Class B

Quarterfinals
Salermxay Xayyasith (LAO) | 15
Allen Coycoyen (PHI) | 8
Firdaus Shukor (MAS) | 15
Đình Trương Giang (VIE) | 0

Semifinals
Visit Kingmanaw (THA) | 15
Salermxay Xayyasith (LAO) | 12
Firdaus Shukor (MAS) | 5
Sudsakorn Sawaengmee (THA) | 15

Final
Visit Kingmanaw (THA) | 15
Sudsakorn Sawaengmee (THA) | 8

==== Individual foil ====
Class A

Quarterfinals
Akhmad Saidah (INA) | 15
Huỳnh Công Sơn (VIE) | 1
Noazizan Mohamad (MAS) | 8
Taufiq Rahman (INA) | 15
Phoopa Saesim (THA) | 15
Hongkham Khamman (LAO) | 6
Muhammad Naim Zulkafli (MAS) | 2
Kitsada Pakdee (THA) | 15

Semifinals
Akhmad Saidah (INA) | 15
Taufiq Rahman (INA) | 12
Phoopa Saesim (THA) | 15
Kitsada Pakdee (THA) | 11

Final
Akhmad Saidah (INA) | 15
Phoopa Saesim (THA) | 14

Class B

Quarterfinals
Mohamad Dinihakimi Nordin (MAS) | 6
Ryo Afandi (INA) | 15
Firdaus Shukor (MAS) | 15
Đình Trương Giang (VIE) | 4

Semifinals
Chitiphat Charoenta (THA) | 15
Ryo Afandi (INA) | 8
Firdaus Shukor (MAS) | 6
Anwa Wae (THA) | 15

Final
Chitiphat Charoenta (THA) | 15
Anwa Wae (THA) | 10

==== Individual sabre ====
Class A

Round of 16
Hongkham Khamman (LAO) | 7
Andy Avellana (PHI) | 15
Wilfredo Bugayong II (PHI) | 15
Olam Norkham (LAO) | 13

Quarterfinals
Krisana Sriujun (MAS) | 15
Andy Avellana (PHI) | 9
Taufiq Rahman (INA) | 15
Tanattarit Songchamrat (THA) | 12
Boonsiri Sanitmuanwai (THA) | 15
Haswadi Moliadi (MAS) | 3
Wilfredo Bugayong II (PHI) | 6
Didit Diantoro (INA) | 15

Semifinals
Krisana Sriujun (MAS) | 15
Taufiq Rahman (INA) | 13
Boonsiri Sanitmuanwai (THA) | 15
Didit Diantoro (INA) | 6

Final
Krisana Sriujun (MAS) | 15
Boonsiri Sanitmuanwai (THA) | 10

Class B

Quarterfinals
Allen Coycoyen (PHI) | 4
Teerapat Khulpisal (THA) | 15
Mohamad Dinihakimi Nordin (MAS) | 13
Ryo Afandi (INA) | 15

Semifinals
Salermxay Xayyasith (LAO) | 15
Teerapat Khulpisal (THA) | 11
Ryo Afandi (INA) | 4
Witsawakon Siphuthon (THA) | 15

Final
Salermxay Xayyasith (LAO) | 15
Witsawakon Siphuthon (THA) | 12

=== Women's ===
==== Individual épée ====
Class A

Quarterfinals
Duean Nakprasit (THA) | 15
Nurul Khalijah Mohd Azlan Shah (MAS) | 3
Marieta Hernandez (PHI) | 11
Marlyn Garrucho (PHI) | 15
Sri Lestari (INA) | 15
Itsaly (LAO) | 3
Boulaphanh Hatsady (LAO) | 3
Arrirat Saisin (THA) | 15

Semifinals
Duean Nakprasit (THA) | 15
Marlyn Garrucho (PHI) | 8
Sri Lestari (INA) | 3
Arrirat Saisin (THA) | 15

Final
Duean Nakprasit (THA) | 15
Arrirat Saisin (THA) | 1

Class B

Quarterfinals
Violeta Salapit (PHI) | 13
Nur Hidayah Badaruddin (MAS) | 15
Niken (INA) | 15
Trương Thị Vân Anh (VIE) | 8
Nguyễn Thị Lệ Quyên (VIE) | 3
Chintanakon Seepak (THA) | 15

Semifinals
Panadda Srithong (THA) | 15
Nur Hidayah Badaruddin (MAS) | 3
Niken (INA) | 6
Chintanakon Seepak (THA) | 15

Final
Panadda Srithong (THA) | 14
Chintanakon Seepak (THA) | 15

==== Individual foil ====
Class A

Quarterfinals
Itsaly (LAO) | 5
Vilayphone Khammekoun (LAO) | 15
Dwi Lestari (INA) | 15
Nurul Khalijah Mohd Azlan Shah (MAS) | 3

Semifinals
Thitirat Pengprasittipong (THA) | 15
Vilayphone Khammekoun (LAO) | 5
Dwi Lestari (INA) | 5
Suthin Sita (THA) | 15

Final
Thitirat Pengprasittipong (THA) | 15
Suthin Sita (THA) | 4

Class B

Quarterfinals
Nur Hidayah Badaruddin (MAS) | 4
Elih (INA) | 15
Nguyễn Thị Lệ Quyên (VIE) | 15
Bounmy Somthala (LAO) | 8
Panadda Srithong (THA) | 10
Trương Thị Vân Anh (VIE) | 15

Semifinals
Saysunee Jana (THA) | 15
Elih (INA) | 4
Nguyễn Thị Lệ Quyên (VIE) | 8
Trương Thị Vân Anh (VIE) | 15

Final
Saysunee Jana (THA) | 15
Trương Thị Vân Anh (VIE) | 5

==== Individual sabre ====
Class A

Quarterfinals
Thitirat Pengprasittipong (THA) | 15
Boulaphanh Hatsady (LAO) | 1
Dwi Lestari (INA) | 5
Sri Lestari (INA) | 15
Marlyn Garrucho (PHI) | 15
Marieta Hernandez (PHI) | 6
Vilayphone Khammekoun (LAO) | 6
Duean Nakprasit (THA) | 15

Semifinals
Thitirat Pengprasittipong (THA) | 15
Sri Lestari (INA) | 10
Marlyn Garrucho (PHI) | 15
Duean Nakprasit (THA) | 13

Final
Thitirat Pengprasittipong (THA) | 11
Marlyn Garrucho (PHI) | 15

Class B

Quarterfinals
Violeta Salapit (PHI) | 7
Wanwisa Singtothong (THA) | 15
Elih (INA) | 15
Bounmy Somthala (LAO) | 3

Semifinals
Saysunee Jana (THA) | 15
Wanwisa Singtothong (THA) | 8
Elih (INA) | 7
Niken (INA) | 15

Final
Saysunee Jana (THA) | 15
Niken (INA) | 2

=== Mixed ===
==== Team épée ====
Quarterfinals
Laos | 14
Philippines | 20
Malaysia | 16
Vietnam | 20

Semifinals
Thailand | 20
Philippines | 4
Vietnam | 10
Indonesia | 20

Final
Thailand | 20
Indonesia | 14

==== Team foil ====
Quarterfinals
Laos | 20
Vietnam | 6

Semifinals
Indonesia | 20
Laos | 14
Malaysia | 4
Thailand | 20

Final
Indonesia | 8
Thailand | 20

==== Team sabre ====
Quarterfinals
Laos | 12
Malaysia | 20

Semifinals
Indonesia | 20
Malaysia | 8
Philippines | 6
Thailand | 20

Final
Indonesia | 5
Thailand | 20
