= Bowling at the 2025 ASEAN Para Games =

- Venue: Blu-O Rythm & Bowl, The Esplanade Ratchada Mall
- Location: Bangkok, Thailand
- Dates: 21–25 January 2026
- Competitors: 77 from 7 nations

Bowling at the 2025 ASEAN Para Games was held at the Esplanade Ratchada Mall in Bangkok, Thailand from 21 to 25 January 2026.

== Participating nations ==
77 athletes from 7 nations competed in the games.

- Brunei (3)
- Indonesia (15)
- Malaysia (16)
- Myanmar (2)
- Philippines (11)
- Singapore (7)
- Thailand (23)

== Medal summary ==
* Host nation (Thailand)

| Rank | Nation | Gold | Silver | Bronze | Total |
|---|---|---|---|---|---|
| 1 | Malaysia (MAS) | 6 | 7 | 1 | 14 |
| 2 | Singapore (SGP) | 2 | 1 | 2 | 5 |
| 3 | Indonesia (INA) | 2 | 0 | 1 | 3 |
| 3 | Philippines (PHI) | 2 | 0 | 1 | 3 |
| 5 | Thailand (THA)* | 1 | 4 | 6 | 11 |
| 6 | Brunei (BRU) | 1 | 1 | 1 | 3 |
| Totals (6 entries) | | 14 | 13 | 12 | 39 |

== Medalists ==
=== Men's ===
| Event | Gold | Silver | Bronze |
|---|---|---|---|
| Singles TPB1 | Kelvin Goh Jong Theng; Singapore | Mohd Suhairi Abd Kadir; Malaysia | Krisada Kietkongtawee; Thailand |
| Singles TPB2 | Kamarul Ariffin Abd Ghaffar; Brunei | Tanapoom Pugtra; Thailand | Saidin Awang Damit; Brunei |
| Singles TPB3 | Mohd Rizal Hassan; Malaysia | Not awarded | |
| Singles TPB4 | Abg Yahya Abg Azhar; Malaysia | Razif Iskandar Abdul Muiz; Malaysia | Phongsakon Suaithong; Thailand |
| Singles TPB8 | Suphan Sinthusuwan; Thailand | Rosheedey Faizal Roslan; Malaysia | Francisco Ednaco; Philippines |
| Singles TPB9 | Mohd Azrin Rahim; Malaysia | Marcos Hao Hong Chang; Malaysia | Low Chang Hong; Singapore |
| Singles TPB10 | Matthew David Chan; Singapore | Raiwin Phitsitthanakul; Thailand | Preecha Wetchkama; Thailand |
| Double TPB4 | Malaysia; Razif Iskandar Abdul Muiz; Abg Yahya Abg Azhar | Thailand; Phongsakon Suaithong; Chayapol Pankomoot | Not awarded |

=== Women's ===
| Event | Gold | Silver | Bronze |
|---|---|---|---|
| Singles TPB8 | Robini; Indonesia | Ruzila Mustafa; Malaysia | Julieyati Abd Jalal; Malaysia |

=== Mixed ===
| Event | Gold | Silver | Bronze |
|---|---|---|---|
| Double TPB1+2/3 | Malaysia; Mohd Rizal Hassan; Mohd Suhairi Abd Kadir | Singapore; Kelvin Goh Jong Theng; Wendy Wong Kim Yen | Thailand; Denpong Chantaramanee; Methini Wongchomphu |
| Double TPB2 | Indonesia; Sahrul Adriansyah; Martha Susanty | Brunei; Saidin Awang Damit; Kamarul Ariffin Abd Ghaffar | Thailand; Sudaporn Khwanphak; Nopphadol Panchalat |
| Double TPB8 | Philippines; Jaime Manginga; Francisco Ednaco | Thailand; Supparat Ponmingmad; Bualai Kuntong | Indonesia; Robini; Prayitno |
| Double TPB9 | Malaysia; Kee Soon Wong; Marcos Hao Hong Chang | Malaysia; Mohd Azrin Rahim; Nadia Syafika Abd Rahman | Singapore; Chang Hong Low; Chee Wai Loo |
| Double TPB10 | Philippines; Samuel Matias; Kim Ian Chi | Malaysia; Mohd Fauzi Md Ghazali; Muhamad Amin Abd Rashid | Thailand; Kornjira Woon; Raiwin Phitsitthanakul |
