= Athletics at the 2025 ASEAN Para Games =

- Venue: 80th Birthday Stadium, Nakhon Ratchasima, Thailand
- Dates: 21–25 January 2026
- Competitors: 338 from 10 nations

Athletics at the 2025 ASEAN Para Games was held at the 80th Birthday Stadium in Nakhon Ratchasima, Thailand from 21 to 25 January 2026.

== Participating nations ==
10 nations competed in para-athletics.

- Brunei (8)
- Indonesia (56)
- Laos (5)
- Malaysia (62)
- Myanmar (30)
- Philippines (35)
- Singapore (4)
- Timor-Leste (5)
- Thailand (85)
- Vietnam (33)

== Medal summary ==
* Host nation (Thailand)

Rank	Nation	Gold	Silver	Bronze	Total
1	Thailand (THA)*	54	39	47	140
2	Indonesia (INA)	44	38	23	105
3	Malaysia (MAS)	20	22	23	65
4	Philippines (PHI)	16	9	13	38
5	Myanmar (MYA)	11	15	11	37
6	Vietnam (VIE)	7	18	11	36
7	Timor-Leste (TLS)	3	1	0	4
8	Singapore (SGP)	1	1	0	2
9	Laos (LAO)	0	3	1	4
10	Brunei (BRU)	0	2	1	3
Totals (10 entries)		156	148	130	434

== Medalists ==
=== Men ===
Event	Class	Gold	Silver	Bronze
100 m	T11	Taufik Abdul Karim; Indonesia	Ruli Al Kahfi Mubarok; Indonesia	Phuthibet Sondet; Thailand
200 m	T11	Taufik Abdul Karim; Indonesia	Ruli Al Kahfi Mubarok; Indonesia	Peerapon Watbok; Thailand
400 m	T11	Taufik Abdul Karim; Indonesia	Ruli Al Kahfi Mubarok; Indonesia	Nguyen Ngoc Hiep; Vietnam
1500 m	T11	Evenezer Celebrado; Philippines	Watchararpong Khomlue; Thailand	Roldan Sagan; Philippines
5000 m	T11	Evenezer Celebrado; Philippines	Vu Tien Manh; Vietnam	Watchararpong Khomlue; Thailand
Long jump	T11	Muhamad Dimas Ubaidillah; Indonesia	Nguyen Ngoc Hiep; Vietnam	Phuthibet Sondet; Thailand
100 m	T12	Muhamad Afiq Ali Hanafiah; Malaysia	Kissanapong Tisuwan; Thailand	Noorhelmie Mohd Rabi; Malaysia
200 m	T12	Muhamad Afiq Ali Hanafiah; Malaysia	Noorhelmie Mohd Rabi; Malaysia	Kissanapong Tisuwan; Thailand
400 m	T12	Kissanapong Tisuwan; Thailand	James Ethan Kai Meng Ang; Singapore	Noorhelmie Mohd Rabi; Malaysia
1500 m	T12	Cyril Cloyd Ongcoy; Philippines	Kissanapong Tisuwan; Thailand	Nguyen Van Bing; Vietnam
5000 m	T12	Cyril Cloyd Ongcoy; Philippines	Nguyen Van Bing; Vietnam	Not awarded
Long jump	T12	Wong Kar Gee; Malaysia	Ahmad Zuaiman Shamsuddin; Malaysia	Muhammad Nazri Hazim Mohan; Malaysia
100 m	T13	Jakkarin Dammunee; Thailand	Not awarded	
200 m	T13	Jakkarin Dammunee; Thailand	Bounphet Thepthida; Laos	Not awarded
400 m	T13	Jakkarin Dammunee; Thailand	Bounphet Thepthida; Laos	Xay Sivilay; Laos
1500 m	T13	Veerawut Chainon; Thailand	Xay Sivilay; Laos	Not awarded
5000 m	T13	Araujo Joaozinho Fernandes; Timor-Leste	Romerio De Jesus; Timor-Leste	Veerawut Chainon; Thailand
Long jump	T13	Mohamad Saifuddin Ishak; Malaysia	Not awarded	
400 m	T20	Alfin Nomleni; Indonesia	Ammar Aiman Nor Azmi; Malaysia	Jan Jayro Palermo; Philippines
800 m	T20	Alfin Nomleni; Indonesia	Haqeem Mustaqim Husmadi; Malaysia	Muhammad Mukrim Mohd Razman; Malaysia
1500 m	T20	Alfin Nomleni; Indonesia	Haqeem Mustaqim Husmadi; Malaysia	Muhamad Nurdin Ibrahim; Malaysia
Long jump	T20	Jan Jayro Palermo; Philippines	Eljoe Gotuoh; Malaysia	Nik Mohamad Rahmat Zahari; Malaysia
100 m	T36/38	Amornthep Phonpanna; Thailand	Muhammad Ridho Alfares; Indonesia	Nathayod Chaikhan; Thailand
200 m	T36/38	Amornthep Phonpanna; Thailand	Nathayod Chaikhan; Thailand	Muhammad Ridho Alfares; Indonesia
400 m	T36/38	Teofilo Freitas; Timor-Leste	Amornthep Phonpanna; Thailand	Muhammad Faiz Haizat Rosdi; Malaysia
Long jump	T36/37/38	Muhammad Nazmi Nasri; Malaysia	Mohd Arman Rosli; Malaysia	Nathayod Chaikhan; Thailand
100 m	T37	Saptoyogo Purnomo; Indonesia	Muhammad Nazmi Nasri; Malaysia	Phakhaphon Saengrat; Thailand
200 m	T37	Saptoyogo Purnomo; Indonesia	Phakhaphon Saengrat; Thailand	Apisit Taprom; Thailand
400 m	T37	Saptoyogo Purnomo; Indonesia	Apisit Taprom; Thailand	Le Van Manh; Vietnam
1500 m	T37/38	Teofilo Freitas; Timor-Leste	Muhammad Faiz Haizat Rosdi; Malaysia	Surasak Damchoom; Thailand
200 m	T42/63	Phalathip Khamta; Thailand	Partin; Indonesia	Not awarded
Long jump	T42/44/63	Phalathip Khamta; Thailand	Eddy Bernard; Malaysia	Kantinan Khumphong; Thailand
High jump	T42/44/63	Nasip; Indonesia	Agus Kurniawan; Indonesia	Tun Zaw Min; Myanmar
100 m	T44	Ivan Jovic Suan; Malaysia	Eddy Bernard; Malaysia	Muhammad Maulana Ashari; Indonesia
200 m	T44	Ivan Jovic Suan; Malaysia	Ryan Arda Diarta; Indonesia	Muhammad Maulana Ashari; Indonesia
400 m	T44/63	Ivan Jovic Suan; Malaysia	Ryan Arda Diarta; Indonesia	Phalathip Khamta; Thailand
100 m	T46	Firza Faturahman Listianto; Indonesia	Joko Muliyono; Indonesia	Myat Aung Myint; Myanmar
200 m	T46	Firza Faturahman Listianto; Indonesia	Figo Saputra; Indonesia	Joko Muliyono; Indonesia
400 m	T46	Figo Saputra; Indonesia	Joko Muliyono; Indonesia	King James Reyes; Philippines
1500 m	T46	King James Reyes; Philippines	Tran Van Duc; Vietnam	Muhamad Ashraf Muhammad Haisham; Malaysia
Long jump	T46	Joshua Santos; Philippines	Pham Xuan Huy; Vietnam	Figo Saputra; Indonesia
100 m	T47	Nur Ferry Pradana; Indonesia	Arvie John Arreglado; Philippines	Arman Dino; Philippines
200 m	T47	Nur Ferry Pradana; Indonesia	Arman Dino; Philippines	Supanit Boonruksa; Thailand
400 m	T47	Nur Ferry Pradana; Indonesia	Tin San; Myanmar	Supanit Boonruksa; Thailand
Long jump	T47	Arvie John Arreglado; Philippines	Chaiwat Sirimongkhol; Thailand	Rezza Surya Amri; Indonesia
High jump	T47	Angkarn Chanaboon; Thailand	Chaiwat Sirimongkhol; Thailand	Myat Aung Myint; Myanmar
Triple jump	T45/46/47	Rezza Surya Amri; Indonesia	Myat Aung Myint; Myanmar	Arvie John Arreglado; Philippines
100 m	T52	Rodrigo Podiotan Jr; Philippines	Jerrold Mangliwan; Philippines	Peth Rungsri; Thailand
400 m	T52	Rodrigo Podiotan Jr; Philippines	Jerrold Mangliwan; Philippines	Peth Rungsri; Thailand
800 m	T52	Cleford Trocino; Philippines	Jerrold Mangliwan; Philippines	Peth Rungsri; Thailand
100 m	T53	Pongsakorn Paeyo; Thailand	Did not awarded	
400 m	T53	Pongsakorn Paeyo; Thailand	Masaberee Arsae; Thailand	Setthawut Phueakfueang; Thailand
800 m	T53	Pongsakorn Paeyo; Thailand	Masaberee Arsae; Thailand	Setthawut Phueakfueang; Thailand
100 m	T54	Athiwat Paeng-nuea; Thailand	Phiphatphong Sianglam; Thailand	Jaenal Aripin; Indonesia
400 m	T54	Phiphatphong Sianglam; Thailand	Athiwat Paeng-nuea; Thailand	Jaenal Aripin; Indonesia
800 m	T54	Phiphatphong Sianglam; Thailand	Putharet Khongrak; Thailand	Jaenal Aripin; Indonesia
1500 m	T54	Prawat Wahoram; Thailand	Putharet Khongrak; Thailand	Phatthanachai Srikamwiang; Thailand
5000 m	T54	Prawat Wahoram; Thailand	Putharet Khongrak; Thailand	Damrongsak Ainkong; Thailand
100 m	T63	Partin; Indonesia	Phalathip Khamta; Thailand	Kantinan Khumphong; Thailand
100 m	T64	Denpoom Kotcharang; Thailand	Soe Pea; Myanmar	Htay Aung Myint; Myanmar
200 m	T64	Soe Pea; Myanmar	Htay Aung Myint; Myanmar	Denpoom Kotcharang; Thailand
400 m	T64	Htay Aung Myint; Myanmar	Denpoom Kotcharang; Thailand	Aung Htet; Myanmar
Discus throw	F11	Muhammad Fahmi Ramlan; Malaysia	Evaristo Carbonel; Philippines	Surakiad Pucharan; Thailand
Shot put	F11	Muhammad Fahmi Ramlan; Malaysia	Do Ngoc Thang; Vietnam	Surakiad Pucharan; Thailand
Shot put	F12	Marcelino Michael; Indonesia	Jyayahmurugan Veeramurugan; Malaysia	Not awarded
Javelin throw	F12/13	Ahmad Zuaiman Shamsuddin; Malaysia	Marcelino Michael; Indonesia	Badrul Hisam Musa; Malaysia
Shot put	F20	Muhammad Ziyad Zolkefli; Malaysia	Mohamad Aliff Mohamad Awi; Malaysia	Boonkong Sanepoot; Thailand
Shot put	F34	Nguyen Viet Dai; Vietnam	Vo Van Tung; Vietnam	Adderin Majurin; Malaysia
Javelin throw	F33/34	Vo Van Tung; Vietnam	Nguyen Viet Dai; Vietnam	Alihan Muda; Brunei
Discus throw	F37	Heronlee Wong; Malaysia	Ahmad Fauzi; Indonesia	Thanaphon Kongsao; Thailand
Shot put	F37	Ahmad Fauzi; Indonesia	Thanaphon Kongsao; Thailand	Tomson Lim Kok Hong; Malaysia
Javelin throw	F37	Thanaphon Kongsao; Thailand	Ahmad Fauzi; Indonesia	Heronlee Wong; Malaysia
Javelin throw	F40	Mohd Afnan Azhar; Malaysia	Tran Van Nguyen; Vietnam	Rocky Logrono; Philippines
Shot put	F40	Noordin Muhammad Diroy; Singapore	Rocky Logrono; Philippines	Tran Van Nguyen; Vietnam
Javelin throw	F41	Ansyari; Indonesia	Sholahuddin Al Ayyubi; Indonesia	Not awarded
Shot put	F41	Sholahuddin Al Ayyubi; Indonesia	Ansyari; Indonesia	Not awarded
Javelin throw	F42/44	Yohanis Bili; Indonesia	Reza Pramana Perangin Angin; Indonesia	Not awarded
Discus throw	F43/44	Reza Pramana Perangin Angin; Indonesia	Yahya; Indonesia	Yohanis Bili; Indonesia
Shot put	F44	Reza Pramana Perangin Angin; Indonesia	Yahya; Indonesia	Yohanis Bili; Indonesia
Javelin throw	F46	Rizal Bagus Saktyono; Indonesia	Angkarn Chanaboon; Thailand	Priyano; Indonesia
Shot put	F46	Rizal Bagus Saktyono; Indonesia	Myat Aung Phone; Myanmar	Priyano; Indonesia
Discus throw	F53/54	Sahardam Yaena; Thailand	Jirawat Saksiripongsa; Thailand	Vengie Aurelio; Philippines
Javelin throw	F53/54	Sahardam Yaena; Thailand	Jirawat Saksiripongsa; Thailand	Vengie Aurelio; Philippines
Shot put	F54	Sahardam Yaena; Thailand	Hj Rudy Izman Hj Badar; Brunei	Jirawat Saksiripongsa; Thailand
Discus throw	F55	Riadi Saputra; Indonesia	Kieu Minh Trung; Vietnam	Amirul Alif Abdul Raof; Malaysia
Javelin throw	F55	Kieu Minh Trung; Vietnam	Riadi Saputra; Indonesia	Joel Balatucan; Philippines
Shot put	F55	Mohammad Zikri Zakaria; Malaysia	Amirul Alif Abdul Raof; Malaysia	Riadi Saputra; Indonesia
Discus throw	F56	Pheerawit Alee; Thailand	Punnapop Utta; Thailand	Trịnh Công Luận; Vietnam
Javelin throw	F56	Htet Sithu; Myanmar	Punnapop Utta; Thailand	Trịnh Công Luận; Vietnam
Shot put	F56	Pheerawit Alee; Thailand	Htet Sithu; Myanmar	Mohd Shahmil Md Saad; Malaysia
Discus throw	F57	I Kadek Dwi Purnawa Yasa; Indonesia	Fauzi Purwolaksono; Indonesia	Cao Ngọc Hùng; Vietnam
Javelin throw	F57	Fauzi Purwolaksono; Indonesia	I Kadek Dwi Purnawa Yasa; Indonesia	Cao Ngọc Hùng; Vietnam
Shot put	F57	Witaya Charoenying; Thailand	I Kadek Dwi Purnawa Yasa; Indonesia	Fauzi Purwolaksono; Indonesia
Javelin throw	F63	Nyo Tin; Myanmar	Lin Aung Tun; Myanmar	Somporn Kiamphan; Thailand
Shot put	F63	Nyo Tin; Myanmar	David Subiyantoro; Indonesia	Lin Aung Tun; Myanmar
Discus throw	F64	Soe Ye Min; Myanmar	Hlaing Hein Htet; Myanmar	Sakchai Yimbanchang; Thailand
Javelin throw	F64	Than Soe; Myanmar	Lin Naung Naung; Myanmar	Sakchai Yimbanchang; Thailand
Shot put	F64	Sakchai Yimbanchang; Thailand	Soe Ye Min; Myanmar	Lwin Zaw Min; Myanmar

=== Women ===
Event	Class	Gold	Silver	Bronze
100 m	T11	Suneeporn Tanomwong; Thailand	Susan Unggu; Indonesia	Janjira Panyatib; Thailand
200 m	T11	Suneeporn Tanomwong; Thailand	Janjira Panyatib; Thailand	Not awarded
400 m	T11	Suneeporn Tanomwong; Thailand	Janjira Panyatib; Thailand	Susan Unggu; Indonesia
800 m	T11	Suneeporn Tanomwong; Thailand	Janjira Panyatib; Thailand	Not awarded
Long jump	T11	Janjira Panyatib; Thailand	Vu Thi Kim Thuy; Vietnam	Alyana Nunez; Philippines
1500 m	T11/13/20	Tiwa; Indonesia	Orawan Kaising; Thailand	Phaewa Prawatto; Thailand
100 m	T12	Ni Made Arianti Putri; Indonesia	Nussaneen Sumalee; Thailand	Not awarded
200 m	T12	Ni Made Arianti Putri; Indonesia	Nussaneen Sumalee; Thailand	Not awarded
400 m	T12	Nussaneen Sumalee; Thailand	Not awarded	
Long jump	T12	Dinh Thao Duyen; Vietnam	Ni Made Arianti Putri; Indonesia	Noorhaslin Rosidi Sabri; Malaysia
800 m	T12/13	Wassana Yimin; Thailand	Nussaneen Sumalee; Thailand	Paiwan Sodamook; Thailand
400 m	T20	Orawan Kaising; Thailand	Elissieball Jonal; Malaysia	Tiwa; Indonesia
800 m	T20	Orawan Kaising; Thailand	Tiwa; Indonesia	Phaewa Prawatto; Thailand
Long jump	T20	Rica Octavia; Indonesia	Nani Shahiera Zawawi; Malaysia	Elissieball Jonal; Malaysia
100 m	T36/37/38	Aorawan Chimpaen; Thailand	Vitasari; Indonesia	Rozabell Rozell Parinus; Malaysia
200 m	T36/37	Rozabell Rozell Parinus; Malaysia	Vitasari; Indonesia	Aorawan Chimpaen; Thailand
400 m	T36/38	Insan Nurhaida; Indonesia	Not awarded	
Long jump	T42/44/61/63/64	Yadanar Tun Nan San; Myanmar	Karisma Evi Tiarani; Indonesia	Win Law Lar; Myanmar
800 m	T46	Pagjiraporn Gagun; Thailand	Not awarded	
1500 m	T46	Pagjiraporn Gagun; Thailand	Not awarded	
200 m	T46/47	Sasirawan Inthachot; Thailand	Nanda Mei Sholihah; Indonesia	Pagjiraporn Gagun; Thailand
Long jump	T46/47	Sasirawan Inthachot; Thailand	Lin Nandar; Myanmar	Jiraporn Wongsuwan; Thailand
100 m	T47	Sasirawan Inthachot; Thailand	Nanda Mei Sholihah; Indonesia	Pagjiraporn Gagun; Thailand
400 m	T47	Sasirawan Inthachot; Thailand	Nanda Mei Sholihah; Indonesia	Pagjiraporn Gagun; Thailand
100 m	T54	Techinee Duangin; Thailand	Novia Mawarni Ayu Ningsih; Indonesia	Not awarded
200 m	T54	Maria Goreti Sami Yati; Indonesia	Artitaya Premphon; Thailand	Techinee Duangin; Thailand
400 m	T54	Artitaya Premphon; Thailand	Techinee Duangin; Thailand	Maria Goreti Sami Yati; Indonesia
800 m	T54	Techinee Duangin; Thailand	Artitaya Premphon; Thailand	Not awarded
1500 m	T53/54	Techinee Duangin; Thailand	Artitaya Premphon; Thailand	Maria Goreti Sami Yati; Indonesia
100 m	T64	Helin Wardina; Indonesia	Yadanar Tun Nan San; Myanmar	Win Law Lar; Myanmar
200 m	T64	Helin Wardina; Indonesia	Win Law Lar; Myanmar	Not awarded
Discus throw	F11	Alyana Nunez; Philippines	Nguyen Thi Chin; Vietnam	Catalina Sunti David Diok; Malaysia
Shot put	F11	Alyana Nunez; Philippines	Dyg Nor Hensan Awg Mataha; Brunei	Pranee Srisan; Thailand
Javelin throw	F12	Elsa Nur Fitriana; Indonesia	Siti Zubaidah Puini; Malaysia	Hemala Devi Eni Kutty; Malaysia
Shot put	F12	Hemala Devi Eni Kutty; Malaysia	Elsa Nur Fitriana; Indonesia	Suphattha Inkhaoyoi; Thailand
Shot put	F20	Suparni Yati; Indonesia	Charmian Sikajat; Malaysia	Siti Noraidah Suherman; Malaysia
Discus throw	F37	Fasai Yapakham; Thailand	Apasiri Nootsreatthee; Thailand	Umi Syuhadah Idris; Malaysia
Javelin throw	F37	Noshazwani Maisara Marzuki; Malaysia	Umi Syuhadah Idris; Malaysia	Apasiri Nootsreatthee; Thailand
Shot put	F37	Fasai Yapakham; Thailand	Apasiri Nootsreatthee; Thailand	Umi Syuhadah Idris; Malaysia
Discus throw	F40/41	Colorine Sijang; Malaysia	Akari Chaw; Myanmar	Mazzdiana Nuratasya Abd Rahim; Malaysia
Shot put	F41	Siti Zaidah Mokhtar; Malaysia	Mazzdiana Nuratasya Abd Rahim; Malaysia	Akari Chaw; Myanmar
Discus throw	F42/43/44	Lia Priyanti; Indonesia	Warmia Marto Samidi; Indonesia	Tran Thi Thuy Hang; Vietnam
Shot put	F44	Lia Priyanti; Indonesia	Doriah Poulus; Malaysia	Tran Thi Thuy Hang; Vietnam
Javelin throw	F46	Patcharee Wisetsee; Thailand	Kedsini Prasopsri; Thailand	Nurnazwa; Indonesia
Shot put	F46	Patcharee Wisetsee; Thailand	Jiraporn Wongsuwan; Thailand	Bingah Tritih Timur; Indonesia
Discus throw	F54	Nguyen Thi Ngoc Thuy; Vietnam	Cendy Asusano; Philippines	Tran Thi Tu; Vietnam
Javelin throw	F54	Cendy Asusano; Philippines	Nguyen Thi Ngoc Thuy; Vietnam	Sukanya Pandongyang; Thailand
Shot put	F54	Cendy Asusano; Philippines	Nguyen Thi Ngoc Thuy; Vietnam	Sukanya Pandongyang; Thailand
Discus throw	F55	Aye Htet Htet; Myanmar	Jesebel Tordecilla; Philippines	Prudencia Panaligan; Philippines
Javelin throw	F55	Jesebel Tordecilla; Philippines	Ngo Thi Lan Thanh; Vietnam	Prudencia Panaligan; Philippines
Shot put	F55	Aye Htet Htet; Myanmar	Ngo Thi Lan Thanh; Vietnam	Jesebel Tordecilla; Philippines
Javelin throw	F56	Puangpet Chaithongrat; Thailand	Famini; Indonesia	Not awarded
Shot put	F56	Puangpet Chaithongrat; Thailand	Famini; Indonesia	Not awarded
Discus throw	F57	Nguyễn Thị Hải; Vietnam	Nguyen Thi Kieu; Vietnam	Reni Ariyanti; Indonesia
Shot put	F57	Nguyễn Thị Hải; Vietnam	Nguyen Thi Kieu; Vietnam	Reni Ariyanti; Indonesia
Shot put	F63/64	Phawt Sein; Myanmar	Win Than Nan Win; Myanmar	Not awarded
Javelin throw	F64	Lia Priyanti; Indonesia	Doriah Poulus; Malaysia	Phawt Sein; Myanmar

=== Mixed ===
Event	Class	Gold	Silver	Bronze
Universal relay	T11–13/33–34/35–38/42–47/51–54/61–64	Thailand (THA); Suneeporn Tanomwong; Sasirawan Inthachot; Pongsakorn Paeyo; Amornthep Phonpanna	Not awarded	
