= Badminton at the 2025 ASEAN Para Games =

- Venue: SPDAT Convention Center, Nakhon Ratchasima Sports Complex
- Location: Nakhon Ratchasima, Thailand
- Dates: 21–25 January 2026
- Competitors: 86 from 8 nations

Para-badminton at the 2025 ASEAN Para Games was held at the Nakhon Ratchasima Sports Complex in Nakhon Ratchasima, Thailand from 21 to 25 January 2026.

== Participating nations ==
8 nations compete in para-archery.

- Indonesia (22)
- Laos (2)
- Malaysia (11)
- Philippines (8)
- Singapore (2)
- Thailand (27)
- Timor-Leste (4)
- Vietnam (10)

== Medal summary ==
* Host nation (Thailand)

| Rank | Nation | Gold | Silver | Bronze | Total |
|---|---|---|---|---|---|
| 1 | Indonesia (INA) | 12 | 9 | 7 | 28 |
| 2 | Thailand (THA)* | 4 | 4 | 16 | 24 |
| 3 | Malaysia (MAS) | 1 | 4 | 3 | 8 |
| 4 | Philippines (PHI) | 0 | 0 | 1 | 1 |
| 4 | Singapore (SGP) | 0 | 0 | 1 | 1 |
| 4 | Vietnam (VIE) | 0 | 0 | 1 | 1 |
| Totals (6 entries) | | 17 | 17 | 29 | 63 |

== Medalists ==
=== Men's ===
| Event | Class | Gold | Silver | Bronze |
|---|---|---|---|---|
| Singles | WH1 | Jakarin Homhual; Thailand | Muhammad Ikhwan Ramli; Malaysia | Agung Widodo; Indonesia |
| Singles | WH1 | Jakarin Homhual; Thailand | Muhammad Ikhwan Ramli; Malaysia | Jehauseng Pohloh; Thailand |
| Singles | WH2 | Supriadi; Indonesia | Wiwin Andri; Indonesia | Agus Budi Utomo; Indonesia |
| Singles | WH2 | Supriadi; Indonesia | Wiwin Andri; Indonesia | Noor Azwan Noorlan; Malaysia |
| Singles | SL3 | Mongkhon Bunsun; Thailand | Muhammad Al Imran; Indonesia | Maman Nurjaman; Indonesia |
| Singles | SL3 | Mongkhon Bunsun; Thailand | Muhammad Al Imran; Indonesia | Dwiyoko; Indonesia |
| Singles | SL4 | Hikmat Ramdani; Indonesia | Fredy Setiawan; Indonesia | Siripong Teamarrom; Thailand |
| Singles | SL4 | Hikmat Ramdani; Indonesia | Fredy Setiawan; Indonesia | Chawarat Kittichokwattana; Thailand |
| Singles | SU5 | Dheva Anrimusthi; Indonesia | Cheah Liek Hou; Malaysia | Suryo Nugroho; Indonesia |
| Singles | SU5 | Dheva Anrimusthi; Indonesia | Cheah Liek Hou; Malaysia | Nik Muhammad Hashraff Muazzam Mohd Hilmin; Malaysia |
| Singles | SH6 | Subhan; Indonesia | Natthapong Meechai; Thailand | Muhammad Amin Azmi; Malaysia |
| Singles | SH6 | Subhan; Indonesia | Natthapong Meechai; Thailand | Xavier Jie Rui Lim; Singapore |
| Doubles | WH1–2 | Malaysia; Muhammad Ikhwan Ramli; Noor Azwan Noorlan | Indonesia; Supriadi; Agung Widodo | Thailand; Akalak Sailen; Anuwat Sriboran |
| Doubles | WH1–2 | Malaysia; Muhammad Ikhwan Ramli; Noor Azwan Noorlan | Indonesia; Supriadi; Agung Widodo | Thailand; Jakarin Homhual; Kittichai Rakjaingam |
| Doubles | SL3–4 | Indonesia; Fredy Setiawan; Dwiyoko | Indonesia; Maman Nurjaman; Hikmat Ramdani | Thailand; Natthapol Chamnanwet; Chawarat Kittichokwattana |
| Doubles | SL3–4 | Indonesia; Fredy Setiawan; Dwiyoko | Indonesia; Maman Nurjaman; Hikmat Ramdani | Thailand; Siripong Teamarrom; Mongkhon Bunsun |
| Doubles | SU5 | Indonesia; Dheva Anrimusthi; Hafizh Briliansyah | Malaysia; Cheah Liek Hou; Mohamad Faris Ahmad Azri | Indonesia; Suryo Nugroho; Oddie Kurnia Dwi Listyanto |
| Doubles | SU5 | Indonesia; Dheva Anrimusthi; Hafizh Briliansyah | Malaysia; Cheah Liek Hou; Mohamad Faris Ahmad Azri | Thailand; Nattaphon Thaweesap; Pricha Somsiri |

=== Women's ===
| Event | Class | Gold | Silver | Bronze |
|---|---|---|---|---|
| Singles | WH2 | Sujirat Pookkham; Thailand | Onanong Phraikaeo; Thailand | Amnouy Wetwithan; Thailand |
| Singles | SL3 | Qonitah Ikhtiar Syakuroh; Indonesia | Siti Maisarah Mat Lawani; Malaysia | Darunee Henpraiwan; Thailand |
| Singles | SL3 | Qonitah Ikhtiar Syakuroh; Indonesia | Siti Maisarah Mat Lawani; Malaysia | Wandee Kamtam; Thailand |
| Singles | SL4 | Leani Ratri Oktila; Indonesia | Khalimatus Sadiyah; Indonesia | Chanida Srinavakul; Thailand |
| Singles | SL4 | Leani Ratri Oktila; Indonesia | Khalimatus Sadiyah; Indonesia | Kathleen Pedrosa; Philippines |
| Singles | SU5 | Warining Rahayu; Indonesia | Rezky Shafi Fauziyah; Indonesia | Nutvara Patitus; Thailand |
| Singles | SH6 | Rina Marlina; Indonesia | Chai Saeyang; Thailand | Apriliyana Sulistyawati; Indonesia |
| Doubles | SL3–SU5 | Indonesia; Khalimatus Sadiyah; Leani Ratri Oktila | Indonesia; Qonitah Ikhtiar Syakuroh; Warining Rahayu | Thailand; Wandee Kamtam; Nutvara Patitus |

=== Mixed ===
| Event | Class | Gold | Silver | Bronze |
|---|---|---|---|---|
| Doubles | WH1–2 | Thailand; Jakarin Homhual; Sujirat Pookkham | Thailand; Kittichai Rakjaingam; Onanong Phraikaeo | Vietnam; Manh Giang Hoang; Thi Hong Thao Hoang |
| Doubles | SL3–SU5 | Indonesia; Hikmat Ramdani; Leani Ratri Oktila | Indonesia; Fredy Setiawan; Khalimatus Sadiyah | Thailand; Siripong Teamarrom; Chanida Srinavakul |
| Doubles | SL3–SU5 | Indonesia; Hikmat Ramdani; Leani Ratri Oktila | Indonesia; Fredy Setiawan; Khalimatus Sadiyah | Thailand; Nattaphon Thaweesap; Darunee Henpraiwan |
