= Archery at the 2025 ASEAN Para Games =

- Venue: Archery Field, Nakhon Ratchasima Sports Complex
- Location: Nakhon Ratchasima, Thailand
- Dates: 21–25 January 2026
- Competitors: 50 from 6 nations

Archery at the 2025 ASEAN Para Games was held at the Nakhon Ratchasima Sports Complex in Nakhon Ratchasima, Thailand from 21 to 25 January 2026.

== Participating nations ==
6 nations compete in para-archery.

- Indonesia (10)
- Malaysia (8)
- Philippines (11)
- Singapore (1)
- Thailand (12)
- Vietnam (8)

== Medal summary ==
* Host nation (Thailand)

Rank	Nation	Gold	Silver	Bronze	Total
1	Indonesia (INA)	5	2	3	10
2	Thailand (THA)*	4	2	1	7
3	Vietnam (VIE)	0	2	2	4
4	Malaysia (MAS)	0	2	1	3
5	Singapore (SGP)	0	1	0	1
6	Philippines (PHI)	0	0	2	2
Totals (6 entries)		9	9	9	27

== Medalists ==
=== Compound ===
Event	Gold	Silver	Bronze
Men's individual	Ken Swagumilang; Indonesia	Comsan Singpirom; Thailand	Arif Firmansyah; Indonesia
Women's individual	Teodora Audi Ayudia Ferelly; Indonesia	Nur Syahidah Alim; Singapore	Agustina Bantiloc; Philippines
Men's doubles	Indonesia; Ken Swagumilang; Arif Firmansyah	Malaysia; Muhammad Aizat Zaini; Wiro Julin; Daneshen Govinda Rajan	Thailand; Comsan Singpirom; Teerasak Phiarthanee; Santi Wantawee
Women's doubles	Thailand; Bussarakorn Kaemkaew; Wasana Khuthawisap; Phannibha Srathongmaew	Vietnam; Thi Chung Bien; Thi Hanh Huynh	Philippines; Agustina Bantiloc; Elizabeth Bayla; Dina Manangdang
Mixed team	Thailand; Comsan Singpirom; Phannibha Srathongmaew	Vietnam; Nguyen Ngoc Hung; Thi Chung Bien	Indonesia; Ken Swagumilang; Teodora Audi Ayudia Ferelly

=== Recurve ===
Event	Gold	Silver	Bronze
Men's individual	Kholidin; Indonesia	Setiawan; Indonesia	Suresh Selvatamby; Malaysia
Women's individual	Phattharaphon Pattawaeo; Thailand	Tpat Chatyotsakorn; Thailand	Mahda Aulia; Indonesia
Men's doubles	Indonesia; Kholidin; Setiawan; Khoirul Anwar	Malaysia; Nurfaizal Hamzah; Muhammad Azaruddin Mat; Suresh Selvatamby	Vietnam; Cuong Ly; Tran Van Quan
Mixed team	Thailand; Hanreuchai Netsiri; Phattharaphon Pattawaeo	Indonesia; Kholidin; Noviera Ross	Vietnam; Cuong Ly; Nguyen Thi Thuy
