= Indonesia at the 2025 ASEAN Para Games =

- IPC code: INA
- NPC: National Paralympic Committee of Indonesia
- Website: www.npcindonesia.org (in Indonesian)

in Nakhon Ratchasima, Thailand
- Competitors: 290 in 18 sports
- Medals Ranked 2nd: Gold 135 Silver 143 Bronze 114 Total 392

ASEAN Para Games appearances (overview)
- 2001; 2003; 2005; 2008; 2009; 2011; 2013; 2015; 2017; 2020; 2022; 2023; 2025

Indonesia competed at the 2025 ASEAN Para Games in Nakhon Ratchasima, Thailand from 20 to 26 January 2026. The Indonesian contingent consists of 290 athletes.

== Medal by date ==
Medals by date
Day	Date	1st place, gold medalist(s)	2nd place, silver medalist(s)	3rd place, bronze medalist(s)	Total
1	20 January	Opening Ceremony			
1	21 January	19	18	13	50
2	22 January	21	20	13	55
3	23 January	29	36	43	107
4	24 January	33	30	19	82
5	25 January	32	40	26	98
6	26 January	Closing Ceremony			
Total		135	143	114	392

== Medal by sport ==
Medals by sport
Sport	1st place, gold medalist(s)	2nd place, silver medalist(s)	3rd place, bronze medalist(s)	Total	Rank
Archery	5	2	3	10	1
Athletics	44	38	23	105	2
CP football	0	0	1	1	3
Cycling	7	5	4	15	3
Shooting	0	2	5	7	5
Bowling	2	0	1	3	4
Table tennis	7	11	25	43	2
Swimming	29	37	20	86	2
Powerlifting	9	4	0	13	1
Chess	9	22	7	38	3
Badminton	12	9	7	28	1
Judo	7	3	1	11	1
Boccia	3	3	4	10	2
Sitting volleyball	0	1	0	1	2
Goalball	0	1	0	1	2
Wheelchair fencing	1	4	12	17	3
Wheelchair tennis	0	1	1	2	3
Total	135	143	114	392	2

== Competitors ==
The following is the list of the number of competitors participating at the Games per sport/discipline.

Sport	Men	Women	Total
Athletics	36	20	56
Archery	5	5	10
Badminton	15	7	22
Boccia	6	5	11
Chess	9	9	18
Cycling	6	2	8
CP football	14	0	14
Goalball	6	0	6
Judo	7	4	11
Powerlifting	6	9	15
Shooting	3	6	9
Sitting Volleyball	8	0	8
Swimming	19	9	28
Table tennis	22	14	36
Bowling	12	3	15
Wheelchair fencing	4	4	8
Wheelchair tennis	2	2	4
Wheelchair basketball	11	0	11
Total	191	99	290

== Wheelchair tennis ==
Athlete	Event	Round 0f 16	Quarterfinals	Semifinals	Final / BM	
Athlete	Event	Opposition Result	Opposition Result	Opposition Result	Opposition Result	Rank
Agus Fitriadi	Men's singles	N T Binh (VIE); W 2-0	S Khlgonrua (THA); W 0-2	Did not advance		
Kevin Sanjaya	Men's singles	—N/a	A S B Borhan (MAS); L 0-2	Did not advance		
Ndaru Patma Putri	Women's singles	—N/a	L T Huong (VIE); W 2-0	S Khanthasit (THA); L 0-2	Did not advance	3rd place, bronze medalist(s)
Siti Hana Komala Sari	Women's singles	—N/a	W Inthanin (THA); L 0-2	Did not advance		

Athlete	Event	Round Robin			
Athlete	Event	Opposition Result	Opposition Result	Opposition Result	Rank
Kevin Sanjaya; Agus Fitriadi	Men's doubles	Thailand; L 0-2	Malaysia; W 2-0	Laos; W 2-0	2nd place, silver medalist(s)

== See also ==
- Indonesia at the 2025 World Games
- Indonesia at the 2025 Islamic Solidarity Games
- Indonesia at the 2025 Asian Youth Games
- 2025 Asian Youth Para Games
- 2025 ASEAN School Games
- Indonesia at the 2025 ASEAN Para Games
