= Swimming at the 2025 ASEAN Para Games =

- Venue: 80th Birthday Stadium Aquatic Center, Nakhon Ratchasima, Thailand
- Dates: 21–25 January 2026
- Competitors: 164 from 9 nations

Swimming at the 2025 ASEAN Para Games was held at the 80th Birthday Stadium Aquatic Center in Nakhon Ratchasima, Thailand from 21–25 January 2026.

== Participating nations ==
9 nations competed in para-swimming.

- Brunei (1)
- Indonesia (28)
- Laos (7)
- Malaysia (21)
- Myanmar (11)
- Philippines (14)
- Singapore (5)
- Thailand (49)
- Vietnam (28)

== Medal summary ==
* Host nation (Thailand)

Rank	Nation	Gold	Silver	Bronze	Total
1	Thailand (THA)*	49	38	27	114
2	Indonesia (INA)	29	37	20	86
3	Vietnam (VIE)	14	17	27	58
4	Malaysia (MAS)	13	20	22	55
5	Philippines (PHI)	13	8	9	30
6	Myanmar (MYA)	8	3	3	14
7	Singapore (SGP)	3	2	1	6
Totals (7 entries)		129	125	109	363

=== Men ===
Event	Class	Gold	Silver	Bronze
50 m backstroke	S4	Hà Văn Hiệp; Vietnam	Charkorn Kaewsri; Thailand	Methasit Nakananram; Thailand
50 m breaststroke	SB3	Nyi Nyi Lin Htet; Myanmar	Hà Văn Hiệp; Vietnam	Methasit Nakananram; Thailand
50 m breaststroke	SB4	Muhammad Nur Syaiful Zulkafli; Malaysia	Mulyadi; Indonesia	Simson Abraham Situmorang; Indonesia
50 m freestyle	S3	Marco Tinamisan; Philippines	Methasit Nakananram; Thailand	not awarded
50 m freestyle	S4	Nyi Nyi Lin Htet; Myanmar	Simson Abraham Situmorang; Indonesia	Nozin; Myanmar
100 m breaststroke	SB4	Mulyadi; Indonesia	Muhammad Nur Syaiful Zulkafli; Malaysia	Simson Abraham Situmorang; Indonesia
100 m freestyle	S4	Nyi Nyi Lin Htet; Myanmar	Marco Tinamisan; Philippines	Simson Abraham Situmorang; Indonesia
150 m individual medley	SM4	Methasit Nakananram; Thailand	Nattawut Kongsripilarom; Thailand	not awarded
200 m freestyle	S3/4	Nyi Nyi Lin Htet; Myanmar	Marco Tinamisan; Philippines	Simson Abraham Situmorang; Indonesia
50 m backstroke	S5	Eakapan Songwichean; Thailand	Wahyu Eqwal Nazrey; Malaysia	Võ Thanh Tùng; Vietnam
50 m butterfly	S5	Natthaphong Wiprajong; Thailand	Eakapan Songwichean; Thailand	Januari; Indonesia
50 m freestyle	S5	Januari; Indonesia	Võ Thanh Tùng; Vietnam	Muhammad Nur Syaiful Zulkafli; Malaysia
100 m backstroke	S5	Eakapan Songwichean; Thailand	Phuchit Aingchaiyaphum; Thailand	Wahyu Eqwal Nazrey; Malaysia
100 m butterfly	S5	Eakapan Songwichean; Thailand	Natthaphong Wiprajong; Thailand	Wahyu Eqwal Nazrey; Malaysia
100 m freestyle	S5	Januari; Indonesia	Muhammad Nur Syaiful Zulkafli; Malaysia	Zy Kher Lee; Thailand
200 m freestyle	S5	Januari; Indonesia	Muhammad Nur Syaiful Zulkafli; Malaysia	Phuchit Aingchaiyaphum; Thailand
200 m individual medley	SM5	Eakapan Songwichean; Thailand	Phuchit Aingchaiyaphum; Thailand	Mulyadi; Indonesia
50 m backstroke	S6/7	Aung Myint Myat; Myanmar	Fajar Nur Hadianto; Indonesia	not awarded
50 m backstroke	S8	Võ Huỳnh Anh Khoa; Vietnam	Rusdianto Rusmadi; Malaysia	Hồ Văn Đạo; Vietnam
50 m backstroke	S9	Muhammad Safwan Suhaimi; Malaysia	Rino Saputra; Indonesia	Nguyễn Hoàng Nhã; Vietnam
50 m backstroke	S10	Sampachan Samathi; Thailand	Ubaidillah Amsyar Juba Ramadhani; Indonesia	Trương Quang Gôn; Vietnam
50 m breaststroke	SB6	Đỗ Thanh Hải; Vietnam	Nanda Soe Min; Myanmar	Lê Tiến Đạt; Vietnam
50 m breaststroke	SB7	Aris Wibawa; Indonesia	Min Htoo; Myanmar	Hán Quang Thoại; Vietnam
50 m breaststroke	SB8	Abd Halim Mohammad; Malaysia	Abdil Majid Rahman; Indonesia	Nguyễn Quang Vương; Vietnam
50 m breaststroke	SB9	Zaki Zulkarnain; Indonesia	Muhaimin Ulag; Philippines	not awarded
50 m butterfly	S6	Aekkarin Noithat; Thailand	Gary Bejino; Philippines	Channi Wongnonthaphum; Thailand
50 m butterfly	S7	Toh Wei Soong; Singapore	Abdil Majid Rahman; Indonesia	Ernie Gawilan; Philippines
50 m butterfly	S8	Rusdianto Rusmadi; Malaysia	Võ Huỳnh Anh Khoa; Vietnam	Hán Quang Thoại; Vietnam
50 m butterfly	S9	Jendi Pangabean; Indonesia	Nantawat Ropkob; Thailand	Phạm Thành Đạt; Vietnam
50 m butterfly	S10	Sampachan Samathi; Thailand	Bayu Putra Yuda; Indonesia	Ubaidillah Amsyar Juba Ramadhani; Indonesia
50 m freestyle	S6	Gary Bejino; Philippines	Aekkarin Noithat; Thailand	Lê Tiến Đạt; Vietnam
50 m freestyle	S7	Toh Wei Soong; Singapore	Abdil Majid Rahman; Indonesia	Kaweewat Sittichaiphonniti; Thailand
50 m freestyle	S9	Abd Halim Mohammad; Malaysia	Zaki Zulkarnain; Indonesia	Nantawat Ropkob; Thailand
50 m freestyle	S10	Sampachan Samathi; Thailand	Ubaidillah Amsyar Juba Ramadhani; Indonesia	Bayu Putra Yuda; Indonesia
100 m backstroke	S7/8	Võ Huỳnh Anh Khoa; Vietnam	Rusdianto Rusmadi; Malaysia	Toh Wei Soong; Singapore
100 m backstroke	S9	Jendi Pangabean; Indonesia	Muhammad Safwan Suhaimi; Malaysia	Rino Saputra; Indonesia
100 m breaststroke	SB6	Muhammad Gerry Pahker; Indonesia	Aekkarin Noithat; Thailand	Lê Tiến Đạt; Vietnam
100 m breaststroke	SB7	Aris Wibawa; Indonesia	Shahafiq bin Abdullah; Malaysia	Hồ Văn Đạo; Vietnam
100 m breaststroke	SB8	Abd Halim Mohammad; Malaysia	Abdil Majid Rahman; Indonesia	Nguyễn Quang Vương; Vietnam
100 m breaststroke	SB9	Zaki Zulkarnain; Indonesia	Bayu Putra Yuda; Indonesia	Muhaimin Ulag; Philippines
100 m butterfly	S8	Rusdianto Rusmadi; Malaysia	not awarded	not awarded
100 m butterfly	S9	Jendi Pangabean; Indonesia	Nantawat Ropkob; Thailand	Nguyễn Ngọc Thiết; Vietnam
100 m butterfly	S10	Ubaidillah Amsyar Juba Ramadhani; Indonesia	Phasit Phukhamkhom; Thailand	not awarded
100 m freestyle	S6	Gary Bejino; Philippines	Aekkarin Noithat; Thailand	Aung Myint Myat; Myanmar
100 m freestyle	S7	Toh Wei Soong; Singapore	Ernie Gawilan; Philippines	not awarded
100 m freestyle	S8	Abd Halim Mohammad; Malaysia	Võ Huỳnh Anh Khoa; Vietnam	Patchara Singhmanon; Thailand
100 m freestyle	S9	Jendi Pangabean; Indonesia	Zaki Zulkarnain; Indonesia	Muhammad Safwan Suhaimi; Malaysia
100 m freestyle	S10	Sampachan Samathi; Thailand	Soe Win; Myanmar	not awarded
200 m backstroke	S9/10	Muhammad Safwan Suhaimi; Malaysia	Trương Quang Gôn; Vietnam	Roland Sabido; Philippines
200 m breaststroke	SB6	Nanda Soe Min; Myanmar	Yongyoot Tabthong; Thailand	not awarded
200 m breaststroke	SB7	Min Htoo; Myanmar	Aris Wibawa; Indonesia	Shahafiq Abdullah; Malaysia
200 m freestyle	S6	Gary Bejino; Philippines	Đỗ Thanh Hải; Vietnam	Aung Myint Myat; Myanmar
200 m freestyle	S7	Ernie Gawilan; Philippines	not awarded	not awarded
200 m freestyle	S8/9	Nantawat Ropkob; Thailand	Nguyễn Ngọc Thiết; Vietnam	Roland Sabido; Philippines
200 m freestyle	S10	Bayu Putra Yuda; Indonesia	Sampachan Samathi; Thailand	not awarded
200 m individual medley	SM6	Aekkarin Noithat; Thailand	Đỗ Thanh Hải; Vietnam	Channi Wongnonthaphum; Thailand
200 m individual medley	SM7/8	Abd Halim Mohammad; Malaysia	Rusdianto Rusmadi; Malaysia	Ernie Gawilan; Philippines
200 m individual medley	SM9	Jendi Pangabean; Indonesia	Zaki Zulkarnain; Indonesia	Nguyễn Ngọc Thiết; Vietnam
200 m individual medley	SM10	Bayu Putra Yuda; Indonesia	Ubaidillah Amsyar Juba Ramadhani; Indonesia	not awarded
400 m freestyle	S6	Gary Bejino; Philippines	Đỗ Thanh Hải; Vietnam	not awarded
400 m freestyle	S7	Ernie Gawilan; Philippines	Toh Wei Soong; Singapore	not awarded
400 m freestyle	S8	Võ Huỳnh Anh Khoa; Vietnam	Hán Quang Thoại; Vietnam	Hồ Văn Đạo; Vietnam
400 m freestyle	S9	Nantawat Ropkob; Thailand	Nguyễn Ngọc Thiết; Vietnam	Roland Sabido; Philippines
400 m freestyle	S10	Soe Win; Myanmar	not awarded	not awarded
50 m breaststroke	SB11	Nguyễn Văn Hạnh; Vietnam	Sukrid Mueanpong; Thailand	Thanongsak Hitakun; Thailand
50 m butterfly	S11	Adisorn Chokniramit; Thailand	Iasadewa Satrianya Aji; Indonesia	Lutfi Afandi; Indonesia
50 m freestyle	S11	Sukrid Mueanpong; Thailand	Iasadewa Satrianya Aji; Indonesia	Chom Sonsamrong; Thailand
100 m breaststroke	SB11	Nguyễn Văn Hạnh; Vietnam	Sukrid Mueanpong; Thailand	Suwasin Pokaew; Thailand
100 m butterfly	S11	Adisorn Chokniramit; Thailand	Nguyễn Văn Tùng; Vietnam	Lutfi Afandi; Indonesia
100 m freestyle	S11	Sukrid Mueanpong; Thailand	Iasadewa Satrianya Aji; Indonesia	Chom Sonsamrong; Thailand
200 m freestyle	S11	Adisorn Chokniramit; Thailand	Sukrid Mueanpong; Thailand	Nguyễn Văn Hạnh; Vietnam
400 m freestyle	S11	Adisorn Chokniramit; Thailand	Chom Sonsamrong; Thailand	Nguyễn Văn Tùng; Vietnam
50 m butterfly	S12	Maulana Rifky Yavianda; Indonesia	Khanawat Khalek; Thailand	Anan Withetsuksom; Thailand
100 m freestyle	S12	Maulana Rifky Yavianda; Indonesia	Anan Withetsuksom; Thailand	Menaser Meriba Numberi; Indonesia
100 m backstroke	S14	Ariel Alegarbes; Philippines	Natirat Meeprom; Thailand	Ethan Khoo Yin Jun; Malaysia
100 m breaststroke	SB14	Nithikorn Jeampiriyakul; Thailand	Syailendra Ihza Firmansyah Putra; Indonesia	Mohd Adib Iqbal Abdullah; Malaysia
100 m butterfly	S14	Nithikorn Jeampiriyakul; Thailand	Ariel Alegarbes; Philippines	Duran Yaspi Imam Basori; Malaysia
100 m freestyle	S14	Bryan Lau Sze Kai; Malaysia	Phakhawat Kumarasing; Thailand	Muhammad Zhafri Adam Mohd Azmi; Malaysia
200 m backstroke	S14	Natirat Meeprom; Thailand	Ariel Alegarbes; Philippines	Duran Yaspi Imam Basori; Malaysia
200 m breaststroke	SB14	Natirat Meeprom; Thailand	Mohd Adib Iqbal Abdullah; Malaysia	Saiful Rizal Abdullah; Malaysia
200 m butterfly	S14	Nithikorn Jeampiriyakul; Thailand	Duran Yaspi Imam Basori; Malaysia	Phakhawat Kumarasing; Thailand
200 m freestyle	S14	Nithikorn Jeampiriyakul; Thailand	Phakhawat Kumarasing; Thailand	Muhammad Zhafri Adam Mohd Azmi; Malaysia
200 m individual medley	SM14	Natirat Meeprom; Thailand	Ethan Khoo Yin Jun; Malaysia	Ariel Alegarbes; Philippines
400 m freestyle	S14	Nithikorn Jeampiriyakul; Thailand	Phakhawat Kumarasing; Thailand	Ethan Khoo Yin Jun; Malaysia
400 m individual medley	SM14	Natirat Meeprom; Thailand	Ethan Khoo Yin Jun; Malaysia	Ariel Alegarbes; Philippines
4×100 m freestyle relay	34 points	Indonesia (INA); Muhammad Gerry Pahker; Jendi Pangabean; Abdil Majid Rahman; Zaki Zulkarnain	Thailand (THA); Nantawat Ropkob; Sampachan Samathi; Patchara Singhmanon; Kaweewat Sittichaiphonniti	Vietnam (VIE); Hồ Văn Đạo; Nguyễn Ngọc Thiết; Phạm Thành Đạt; Võ Huỳnh Anh Khoa
4×100 m medley relay	34 points	Indonesia (INA); Muhammad Gerry Pahker; Jendi Pangabean; Abdil Majid Rahman; Zaki Zulkarnain	Thailand (THA); Aekkarin Noithat; Nantawat Ropkob; Sampachan Samathi; Patchara Singhmanon	Malaysia (MAS); Shahafiq Abdullah; Abd Halim Mohammad; Rusdianto Rusmadi; Muhammad Safwan Suhaimi

=== Women ===
Event	Class	Gold	Silver	Bronze
50 m backstroke	S4/5	Angel Otom; Philippines	Wilasini Wongnonthapoom; Thailand	Brenda Anellia Larry; Malaysia
50 m breaststroke	SB4/5	Trịnh Thị Bích Như; Vietnam	Nathee Phimsan; Thailand	Nguyễn Thị Sari; Vietnam
50 m freestyle	S4/5	Angel Otom; Philippines	Wilasini Wongnonthapoom; Thailand	Brenda Anellia Larry; Malaysia
100 m backstroke	S4/5	Angel Otom; Philippines	Wilasini Wongnonthapoom; Thailand	not awarded
100 m breaststroke	SB4/5	Trịnh Thị Bích Như; Vietnam	Nathee Phimsan; Thailand	Nguyễn Thị Sari; Vietnam
100 m freestyle	S4/5	Angel Otom; Philippines	Wilasini Wongnonthapoom; Thailand	Danh Thị Mỹ Thánh; Vietnam
200 m freestyle	S5	Angel Otom; Philippines	Wilasini Wongnonthapoom; Thailand	not awarded
50 m backstroke	S6/7	Vi Thị Hằng; Vietnam	Nor Aimah; Indonesia	Patcharin Chanin; Thailand
50 m breaststroke	SB8	Prakaithip Chaiwong; Thailand	Carmen Lim; Malaysia	Hoàng Thị Mỹ Lệ; Vietnam
50 m butterfly	S7/8	Carmen Lim; Malaysia	Nor Aimah; Indonesia	Lê Thị Dung; Vietnam
50 m freestyle	S6	Siti Alfiah; Indonesia	Trịnh Thị Bích Như; Vietnam	Riyanti; Indonesia
50 m freestyle	S7	Vi Thị Hằng; Vietnam	Nor Aimah; Indonesia	Nathee Phimsan; Thailand
50 m freestyle	S8	Carmen Lim; Malaysia	Lê Thị Dung; Vietnam	Panisa Vaipod; Thailand
100 m backstroke	S6/7	Vi Thị Hằng; Vietnam	Nathee Phimsan; Thailand	Patcharin Chanin; Thailand
100 m breaststroke	SB7/8	Prakaithip Chaiwong; Thailand	Hoàng Thị Mỹ Lệ; Vietnam	Carmen Lim; Malaysia
100 m freestyle	S6	Siti Alfiah; Indonesia	Trịnh Thị Bích Như; Vietnam	Riyanti; Indonesia
100 m freestyle	S7	Vi Thị Hằng; Vietnam	not awarded	not awarded
100 m freestyle	S8	Lê Thị Dung; Vietnam	Carmen Lim; Malaysia	Panisa Vaipod; Thailand
400 m freestyle	S6	Siti Alfiah; Indonesia	Trịnh Thị Bích Như; Vietnam	Riyanti; Indonesia
50 m breaststroke	SB9	Mutiara Cantik Harsanto; Indonesia	Ong Jia Xuan; Malaysia	Monruedee Kangpila; Thailand
50 m freestyle	S9	Anchaya Ketkeaw; Thailand	Mutiara Cantik Harsanto; Indonesia	Surerut Komkeaw; Thailand
100 m breaststroke	SB9	Mutiara Cantik Harsanto; Indonesia	Ong Jia Xuan; Malaysia	Monruedee Kangpila; Thailand
100 m freestyle	S9	Anchaya Ketkeaw; Thailand	Mutiara Cantik Harsanto; Indonesia	Surerut Komkeaw; Thailand
200 m freestyle	S9	Anchaya Ketkeaw; Thailand	Zahra Nur Azizah; Indonesia	Surerut Komkeaw; Thailand
50 m freestyle	S10	Monruedee Kangpila; Thailand	Theradina Audria Lie; Indonesia	Lê Thị Trâm; Vietnam
100 m freestyle	S10	Monruedee Kangpila; Thailand	Theradina Audria Lie; Indonesia	Lê Thị Trâm; Vietnam
200 m individual medley	SM10	Anchaya Ketkeaw; Thailand	Monruedee Kangpila; Thailand	Mutiara Cantik Harsanto; Indonesia
100 m backstroke	S14	Siti Aisyah; Indonesia	Nattharinee Khajhonmatha; Thailand	Meliana Ratih Pratama; Indonesia
100 m breaststroke	SB14	Wachiraphon Thavornvasu; Thailand	Syuci Indriani; Indonesia	Aleeya Fariesya Faizul Rizal; Malaysia
100 m butterfly	S14	Syuci Indriani; Indonesia	Danielle Moi Yan Ting; Singapore	Luksika Uttisen; Thailand
100 m freestyle	S14	Nattharinee Khajhonmatha; Thailand	Wachiraphon Thavornvasu; Thailand	Siti Aisyah; Indonesia
200 m backstroke	S14	Siti Aisyah; Indonesia	Meliana Ratih Pratama; Indonesia	Wachiraphon Thavornvasu; Thailand
200 m breaststroke	SB14	Wachiraphon Thavornvasu; Thailand	Syuci Indriani; Indonesia	Aleeya Fariesya Faizul Rizal; Malaysia
200 m freestyle	S14	Nattharinee Khajhonmatha; Thailand	Meliana Ratih Pratama; Indonesia	Siti Aisyah; Indonesia
200 m individual medley	SM14	Nattharinee Khajhonmatha; Thailand	Syuci Indriani; Indonesia	Siti Aisyah; Indonesia
400 m freestyle	S14	Nattharinee Khajhonmatha; Thailand	Syuci Indriani; Indonesia	Claire Calizo; Philippines

=== Mixed ===
Event	Class	Gold	Silver	Bronze
4×50 m freestyle relay	20 points	Thailand (THA); Aekkarin Noithat; Plaifa Thongrueang; Channi Wongnonthaphum; Wilasini Wongnonthapoom	Philippines (PHI); Gary Bejino; Angel Otom; Beariza Roble; Marco Tinamisan	Malaysia (MAS); Brenda Anellia Larry; Wahyu Eqwal Nazrey; Sharlinie Valerie Wen Qin Voo; Muhammad Nur Syaiful Zulkafli
4×50 m medley relay	20 points	Thailand (THA); Patcharin Chanin; Zy Kher Lee; Eakapan Songwichean; Wilasini Wongnonthapoom	Malaysia (MAS); Brenda Anellia Larry; Wahyu Eqwal Nazrey; Sharlinie Valerie Wen Qin Voo; Muhammad Nur Syaiful Zulkafli	Vietnam (VIE); Danh Thị Mỹ Thánh; Hà Văn Hiệp; Vi Thị Hằng; Võ Thanh Tùng
4×100 m freestyle relay	34 points	Thailand (THA); Phuchit Aingchaiyaphum; Monruedee Kangpila; Anchaya Ketkeaw; Sampachan Samathi	Malaysia (MAS); Carmen Lim; Abd Halim Mohammad; Ong Jia Xuan; Muhammad Safwan Suhaimi	not awarded
4×100 m freestyle relay	S14	Thailand (THA); Nithikorn Jeampiriyakul; Nattharinee Khajhonmatha; Natirat Meeprom; Wachiraphon Thavornvasu	Indonesia (INA); Siti Aisyah; Syuci Indriani; Fathur Rizky Moreno; Syailendra Ihza Firmansyah Putra	Malaysia (MAS); Aleeya Fariesya Faizul Rizal; Ethan Khoo Yin Jun; Bryan Lau Sze Kai; Asyiil Raziin Razman
4×100 m medley relay	34 points	Thailand (THA); Monruedee Kangpila; Anchaya Ketkeaw; Nantawat Ropkob; Kaweewat Sittichaiphonniti	Malaysia (MAS); Carmen Lim; Ong Jia Xuan; Rusdianto Rusmadi; Muhammad Safwan Suhaimi	not awarded
4×100 m medley relay	S14	Thailand (THA); Nithikorn Jeampiriyakul; Nattharinee Khajhonmatha; Natirat Meeprom; Wachiraphon Thavornvasu	Indonesia (INA); Siti Aisyah; Syuci Indriani; Fathur Rizky Moreno; Syailendra Ihza Firmansyah Putra	Malaysia (MAS); Aleeya Fariesya Faizul Rizal; Ethan Khoo Yin Jun; Nik Muhammad Joe Asyraff Nik Rafizal; Asyiil Raziin Razman
