= Singapore at the 2025 ASEAN Para Games =

Sporting event delegation and medal list

- IPC code: SGP
- NPC: Singapore National Paralympic Council
- Website: www.snpc.org.sg (in English)

in Nakhon Ratchasima, Thailand
- Competitors: 37 in 11 sports
- Medals Ranked 7th: Gold 13 Silver 7 Bronze 9 Total 29

ASEAN Para Games appearances
- 2001; 2003; 2005; 2008; 2009; 2011; 2013; 2015; 2017; 2020; 2022; 2023; 2025

Singapore competed at the 2025 ASEAN Para Games in Nakhon Ratchasima, Thailand from 20 to 26 January 2026. The Singapore contingent initially consisted of 41 athletes across 11 of the 19 available sports. However, the actual contingent at the Games was only 37 athletes.

== Medal by sport ==
Medals by sport
Sport	1st place, gold medalist(s)	2nd place, silver medalist(s)	3rd place, bronze medalist(s)	Total
Archery	0	1	0	1
Athletics	1	1	0	2
Cycling	1	0	1	2
Shooting	2	1	0	3
Bowling	2	1	2	5
Table tennis	0	0	2	2
Swimming	3	2	1	6
Powerlifting	0	0	0	0
Badminton	0	0	1	1
Judo	0	1	0	1
Boccia	4	0	2	6
Total	13	7	9	29

== Competitors ==
The following is the list of the number of competitors participating at the Games per sport/discipline.

Sport	Men	Women	Total
Archery	0	1	1
Athletics	3	1	4
Badminton	2	0	2
Boccia	2	3	5
Cycling	3	1	4
Judo	0	1	1
Powerlifting	1	0	1
Shooting	2	2	4
Swimming	4	1	5
Table tennis	2	1	3
Bowling	6	1	7
Total	25	12	37

== See also ==
- 2025 Asian Youth Para Games
- 2025 ASEAN School Games
