= Gary Bejino =

Filipino Paralympic swimmer

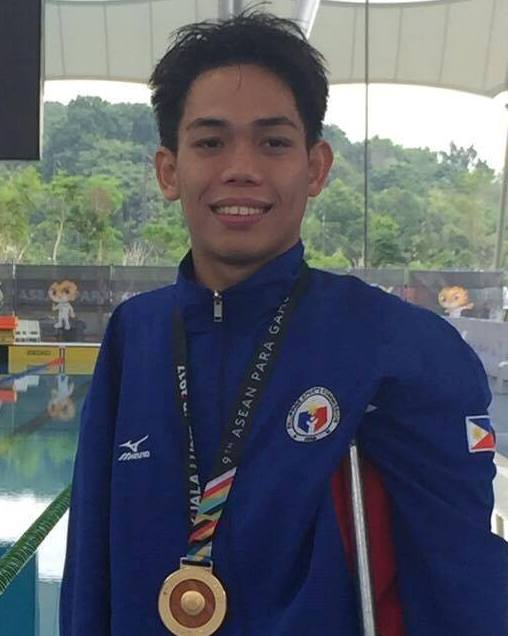
- Bejino in 2017

Personal information
- Full name: Gary Adornado Bejino
- Nationality: Philippines
- Born: November 6, 1995 (age 30)

Sport
- Sport: Swimming
- Strokes: butterfly, backstroke, freestyle
- Classifications: S6, SB6, SM6, S7, SB7, SM7
Medal record
Men's paralympic swimming
Representing Philippines
Event	1st	2nd	3rd
Asian Para Games	0	1	4
Asian Youth Para Games	0	1	1
ASEAN Para Games	7	4	3
Total	7	6	8
Asian Para Games
Silver medal – second place	2018 Jakarta	200m Individual Medley SM6
Bronze medal – third place	2018 Jakarta	100m freestyle S6
Bronze medal – third place	2018 Jakarta	100m backstroke S6
Bronze medal – third place	2022 Hangzhou	100m freestyle S6
Bronze medal – third place	2022 Hangzhou	400m freestyle S6
Asian Youth Para Games
Silver medal – second place	2013 Kuala Lumpur	100m freestyle S7
Bronze medal – third place	2013 Kuala Lumpur	100m breaststroke S7
ASEAN Para Games
Gold medal – first place	2025 Nakhon Ratchasima	200m freestyle S6
Gold medal – first place	2025 Nakhon Ratchasima	400m freestyle S6
Gold medal – first place	2025 Nakhon Ratchasima	50m freestyle S6
Gold medal – first place	2025 Nakhon Ratchasima	100m freestyle S6
Gold medal – first place	2022 Surakarta	100m freestyle S6
Gold medal – first place	2017 Kuala Lumpur	400m freestyle S7
Gold medal – first place	2015 Singapore	400m freestyle S7
Silver medal – second place	2025 Nakhon Ratchasima	50m butterfly S6
Silver medal – second place	2025 Nakhon Ratchasima	Mixed 4x50m freestyle relay 20 pts S1-S10
Silver medal – second place	2022 Surakarta	50m freestyle S6
Silver medal – second place	2022 Surakarta	50m butterfly S6
Bronze medal – third place	2017 Kuala Lumpur	100m backstroke S7
Bronze medal – third place	2017 Kuala Lumpur	4×100 m freestyle relay 34 pts
Bronze medal – third place	2017 Kuala Lumpur	4×100 m medley relay 34 pts

Gary Adornado Bejino (born November 6, 1995) is a Filipino swimmer who competed at the 2020 Summer Paralympics.

== Early life ==
Gary Bejino was born on November 6, 1995 and was the second eldest in a brood of six. His father is a laborer while his mother is a homemaker. At age 7, he acquired his disability when he was electrocuted when he held on to a live power cable. He sustained serious burns which required his right arm and left leg to be amputated. Growing up in Albay, Bejino spent his 1st to 4th grade elementary education before moving to a foundation ran by priests.

== Career ==
Bejino took up swimming when he moved to Metro Manila. He represented his school at the 2013 Palarong Pambansa in Dumaguete in para-swimming, bagging three gold medals and was scouted by national coach Tony Ong who is looking for swimmers for the 2013 Asian Youth Para Games in Malaysia He was entered in the 2013 Asian Youth Para Games where he won a silver and a bronze medal.

He participated at the 2015 ASEAN Para Games in Singapore where he clinched a gold medal in the men's 400-meter freestyle. He won another gold in the 2017 edition. He also competed in the 2018 Asian Para Games in Indonesia where he clinch one silver and two bronze medals.

He qualified to compete in the 2020 Summer Paralympics in Tokyo through a bipartite invitation.
