= Ariel Alegarbes =

Filipino paralympic swimmer

Personal information
- Nationality: Philippines
- Born: May 13, 2004 (age 22)
- Home town: Victorias, Negros Occidental

Sport
- Sport: Swimming
- Strokes: butterfly, backstroke, freestyle
- Classifications: S14, SB14, SM14
Medal record
Men's paralympic swimming
Representing Philippines
Event	1st	2nd	3rd
Asian Para Games	1	0	0
Asian Youth Para Games	1	2	0
ASEAN Para Games	6	3	2
Total	8	5	2
Asian Para Games
Gold medal – first place	2026 Aichi–Nagoya	100m backstroke S14
Asian Youth Para Games
Gold medal – first place	2021 Bahrain	100m butterfly multiclass S14
Silver medal – second place	2021 Bahrain	100m backstroke S14
Silver medal – second place	2021 Bahrain	100m breaststroke S14
ASEAN Para Games
Gold medal – first place	2022 Surakarta	100m backstroke S14
Gold medal – first place	2022 Surakarta	50m butterfly S14
Gold medal – first place	2022 Surakarta	50m freestyle S14
Gold medal – first place	2023 Cambodia	50m butterfly S14
Gold medal – first place	2023 Cambodia	200m individual medley SM5
Gold medal – first place	2025 Thailand	100m backstroke S14
Silver medal – second place	2023 Cambodia	100m butterfly S14
Silver medal – second place	2025 Thailand	100m butterfly S14
Silver medal – second place	2025 Thailand	200m backstroke S14
Bronze medal – third place	2025 Thailand	200m individual medley SM14
Bronze medal – third place	2025 Thailand	400m individual medley SM14

Ariel Joseph Alegarbes is a Filipino para-swimmer.

== Early life ==
Ariel Joseph Alegarbes was born on May 13, 2004. His father, Abner Alegarbes was a former Sangguniang Kabataan chairman in their hometown of Victorias, Negros Occidental. The younger Alegabres was diagnosed with attention deficit hyperactivity disorder with learning disability and dyslexia at age five which led to his father to quit his job as a construction worker.

The elder Alegabes also enrolled his son in swimming classes to help deal with asthma.

== Career ==
Ariel Alegarbes has competed at the Palarong Pambansa in Davao City in 2019 where he won a silver medal.

Alegarbes has represented the Philippines in international para-swimming competitions in the S14 class. He earned a gold medal at the 2021 Asian Youth Para Games in Bahrain in the 100-meter butterfly multiclass event. He also won a silver each in the 100m backstroke and breaststroke.

He made his debut in the ASEAN Para Games, representing the Philippines at the 2022 edition in Surakarta, Indonesia. Competing in the S14 class, he won a total of three medals in the 100-meter backstroke, 50m butterfly, and the 50m freestyle. He broke the games record in the first two events set in 2017 ASEAN Para Games in Malaysia.

At the 2023 ASEAN Para Games in Cambodia, Alegabres was named flagbearer for the opening ceremony. He won gold medals in the 50m butterfly and 200m individual medley SM5; and a silver in the 100m butterfly

At the 2026 Asian Para Games in Aichi and Nagoya, Japan, Ariel Alegarbes won a gold medal in the men’s 100-meter backstroke S14 event clocking 1:01.56.
