= Angel Otom =

Filipino para-swimmer (born 2003)

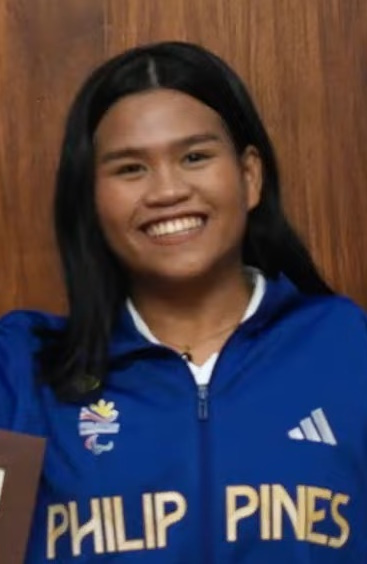
- Otom in 2024

Personal information
- Full name: Angel Mae Otom
- National team: Philippines
- Born: June 30, 2003 (age 23) Meycauayan, Bulacan, Philippines

Sport
- Sport: Swimming
- Strokes: Backstroke
- Classifications: S5, SM5
Medal record
Women's paralympic swimming
Representing Philippines
Asian Youth Para Games
Bronze medal – third place	2021 Manama	50 m backstroke S5
ASEAN Para Games
Gold medal – first place	2025 Thailand	200 m freestyle S5
Gold medal – first place	2025 Thailand	100 m backstroke S4/5
Gold medal – first place	2025 Thailand	100 m freestyle S4/5
Gold medal – first place	2025 Thailand	50 m backstroke S4/5
Gold medal – first place	2025 Thailand	50 m freestyle S4/5
Gold medal – first place	2023 Cambodia	50 m freestyle S5
Gold medal – first place	2023 Cambodia	50 m backstroke S5
Gold medal – first place	2023 Cambodia	50 m butterfly S5
Gold medal – first place	2023 Cambodia	200 m individual medley SM5
Gold medal – first place	2022 Solo	50 m freestyle S5
Gold medal – first place	2022 Solo	50 m backstroke S5
Gold medal – first place	2022 Solo	50 m butterfly S5
Mixed paralympic swimming
Representing Philippines
Silver medal – second place	2025 Thailand	4×50 m freestyle relay 20 points

Angel Mae Otom (born June 30, 2003) is a Filipino para-swimmer who competed in the 2024 Summer Paralympics.

== Early life and education ==
Otom was born on June 30, 2003. Her father Marlou is a tattoo artist and her mother Mila is a teacher. She has congenital upper limb deficiency – no left arm and an underdeveloped right arm. She hails Olongapo which is also her mother's hometown but was born in Meycauayan, Bulacan.

She also studied at the Olongapo City National High School and took part at the 2019 Division School Press Conference editorial cartooning contest and drew using her feet.

She currently studies Sports Science at the University of the Philippines Diliman–College of Human Kinetics as of 2024.

== Career ==
Otom would become part of the Philippine national para-swimming team in 2019, after taking part at the 2018 Philippine Sports Association for Disabled Athletes (PHILSPADA) National Para Games in Marikina. Her first international competition would be the 2021 Asian Youth Para Games in Bahrain where she bagged a bronze in the women's 50m backstroke.

Otom competed in the ASEAN Para Games, particularly in the 2022 and 2023 editions. She won three golds in the former and four in the latter. She also took part in the 2022 Asian Para Games in Hangzhou.

She took part at the 2023 World Para Swimming Championships.

At the 2024 Summer Paralympics in Paris, Otom competed in two events. In the women's 50m backstroke S5 she finished sixth in the final. She likewise reached the final of the 50-meter backstroke S5 event. She finished fifth place after clocking 45.78-seconds, her personal best.

At the 2025 ASEAN Para Games in January 2026, Otom has won five gold medals and one silver medal. Otom broke an 18-year games record at the women's 100m backstroke S4–S5 clocking 1:43.87 breaking the record set by Thai swimmer Junkum Thatananatch of 2:33.66 in the 2008 ASEAN Para Games.
