= Malaysia at the 2025 ASEAN Para Games =

- IPC code: MAS
- NPC: Paralympic Council of Malaysia
- Website: www.paralympic.org.my (in English)

in Nakhon Ratchasima, Thailand 20–26 January 2026
- Competitors: 238 in 18 sports
- Flag bearers: Akmal Danish Mohamad Supi; Nurzammiezatul Syafiqqah Zamberi
- Officials: 120
- Medals Ranked 3rd: Gold 64 Silver 64 Bronze 73 Total 201

ASEAN Para Games appearances (overview)
- 2001; 2003; 2005; 2008; 2009; 2011; 2014; 2015; 2017; 2022; 2023; 2025

Malaysia competed at the 2025 ASEAN Para Games in Nakhon Ratchasima, Thailand from 20 to 26 January 2026. The Malaysian contingent consisted of 238 athletes. The contingent also included 120 officials.

== Medal summary ==
=== Medal by sports ===
Medals by sport
Sport	1st place, gold medalist(s)	2nd place, silver medalist(s)	3rd place, bronze medalist(s)	Total
Athletics	20	22	23	65
Swimming	13	20	22	55
Cycling	9	5	4	18
Bowling	6	7	1	14
Powerlifting	5	2	1	8
Table tennis	4	0	4	8
Boccia	2	1	2	5
Wheelchair fencing	2	0	5	7
Badminton	1	4	3	8
Wheelchair tennis	1	0	3	4
Shooting	1	0	0	1
Archery	0	2	1	3
Blind football	0	1	0	1
Wheelchair basketball	0	0	2	2
Chess	0	0	1	1
Judo	0	0	1	1
Total	64	64	73	201

=== Medal by date ===
Medals by date
Date	1st place, gold medalist(s)	2nd place, silver medalist(s)	3rd place, bronze medalist(s)	Total
21 January	9	13	17	39
22 January	8	9	14	31
23 January	16	12	11	39
24 January	16	10	16	42
25 January	15	20	15	50
Total	64	64	73	201

== Medalists ==
Medal	Name	Sport	Event	Date
Gold	Ivan Jovic Suan	Athletics	Men's 200m T44	21 January
Gold	Muhammad Nazmi Nasri	Athletics	Men's Long Jump T38	21 January
Gold	Heronlee Wong	Athletics	Men's Discus Throw F37	21 January
Gold	Ahmad Zuaiman Shamsuddin	Athletics	Men's Javelin Throw F12–F13	21 January
Gold	Colorine Sijang	Athletics	Women's Discus Throw F40–F41	21 January
Gold	Mohammad Yusof Hafizi Shaharuddin	Cycling – Road	Men's Time Trial C1–C2	21 January
Gold	Perameswary Kashinathan	Shooting	Women's R2 10m Air Rifle Standing SH1	21 January
Gold	Mohd Rizal Hassan	Tenpin Bowling	Men's Singles TPB3	21 January
Gold	Krisana Sriujun	Wheelchair Fencing	Men's Individual Épée A	21 January
Gold	Muhamad Afiq Mohamad Ali Hanafiah	Athletics	Men's 100m T12	22 January
Gold	Ivan Jovic Suan	Athletics	Men's 100m T44	22 January
Gold	Mohamad Saifuddin Ishak	Athletics	Men's Long Jump T13	22 January
Gold	Muhammad Fahmi Ramlan	Athletics	Men's Discus Throw F11	22 January
Gold	Hemala Devi Eni Kutty	Athletics	Women's Shot Put F12	22 January
Gold	Nur Azlia Syafinaz Mohd Zais	Cycling – Road	Women's Road Race B	22 January
Gold	Rusdianto Rusmadi	Swimming	Men's 50m Butterfly S8	22 January
Gold	Abg Yahya Abg Azhar	Tenpin Bowling	Men's Singles TPB4	22 January
Gold	Muhamad Afiq Mohamad Ali Hanafiah	Athletics	Men's 200m T12	23 January
Gold	Ivan Jovic Suan	Athletics	Men's 400m T44–T63	23 January
Gold	Muhammad Fahmi Ramlan	Athletics	Men's Shot Put F11	23 January
Gold	Muhammad Ziyad Zolkefli	Athletics	Men's Shot Put F20	23 January
Gold	Mohd Afnan Azhar	Athletics	Men's Javelin Throw F40	23 January
Gold	Siti Zaidah Mokhtar	Athletics	Women's Shot Put F41	23 January
Gold	Noor Askuzaimey Mat Salim	Boccia	Women's Individual BC4	23 January
Gold	Muhammad Akmal Danish Mohd Supi	Powerlifting	Men's –72 kg	23 January
Gold	Bibiana Ahmad	Powerlifting	Women's –67 kg	23 January
Gold	Bryan Lau Sze Kai	Swimming	Men's 100m Freestyle S14	23 January
Gold	Muhammad Nur Syaiful Zulkafli	Swimming	Men's 50m Breaststroke SB4	23 January
Gold	Rusdianto Rusmadi	Swimming	Men's 100m Butterfly S8	23 January
Gold	Jennahtul Fahmi Ahmad Jennah	Table Tennis	Men's Singles TT11	23 January
Gold	Gloria Gracia Wong Sze	Table Tennis	Women's Singles TT10	23 January
Gold	Mohd Azrin Rahim	Tenpin Bowling	Men's Singles TPB9	23 January
Gold	Krisana Sriujun	Wheelchair Fencing	Men's Individual Sabre A	23 January
Gold	Mohammad Zikri Zakaria	Athletics	Men's Shot Put F55	24 January
Gold	Rozabell Rozell Parinus	Athletics	Women's 200m T36–T37	24 January
Gold	Ahmad Ahlami Mohammad	Cycling – Track	Men's 1000m Time Trial B	24 January
Gold	Mohammad Yusof Hafizi Shaharuddin	Cycling – Track	Men's 1000m Time Trial C1–C2	24 January
Gold	Nur Suraiya Muhamad Zamri	Cycling – Track	Women's 1000m Time Trial B	24 January
Gold	Mohd Khairul Hazwan Wahab; Nur Suraiya Muhamad Zamri	Cycling – Track	Mixed Team Sprint B	24 January
Gold	Bonnie Bunyau Gustin	Powerlifting	Men's –80kg	24 January
Gold	Nicodemus Manggoi Moses	Powerlifting	Men's –107kg	24 January
Gold	Abd Halim Mohammad	Swimming	Men's 50m Freestyle S9	24 January
Gold	Muhammad Safwan Suhaimi	Swimming	Men's 200m Backstroke S9–S10	24 January
Gold	Abd Halim Mohammad	Swimming	Men's 100m Breaststroke SB8	24 January
Gold	Abd Halim Mohammad	Swimming	Men's 200m Individual Medley SM7–SM8	24 January
Gold	Carmen Lim	Swimming	Women's 50m Butterfly S7–S8	24 January
Gold	Chao Ming Chee; Gloria Gracia Wong Sze	Table Tennis	Mixed Doubles TT20	24 January
Gold	Abg Yahya Abg Azhar; Muhammad Razif Iskandar Abdul Muiz	Tenpin Bowling	Men's Doubles TPB4	24 January
Gold	Mohd Rizal Hassan; Mohd Suhairi Abd Kadir	Tenpin Bowling	Mixed Doubles TPB1+TPB2/3	24 January
Gold	Wong Kar Gee	Athletics	Men's long jump T12	25 January
Gold	Noshazwani Maisara Marzuki	Athletics	Women's Javelin Throw F37	25 January
Gold	Muhammad Ikhwan Ramli; Noor Azwan Noorlan	Badminton	Men's doubles WH1–2	25 January
Gold	Mohamad Hanafi Mohd Rosli; Noor Askuzaimey Mat Salim	Boccia	Mixed doubles BC4	25 January
Gold	Mohammad Yusof Hafizi Shaharuddin	Cycling – Track	Men's 3000m Individual Pursuit C1–C3	25 January
Gold	Mohd Khairul Hazwan Wahab	Cycling – Track	Men's Sprint B	25 January
Gold	Nur Azlia Syafinaz Mohd Zais	Cycling – Track	Women's 4000m Individual Pursuit B	25 January
Gold	Wan Nur Azri Wan Azman	Powerlifting	Men's +107kg	25 January
Gold	Abd Halim Mohammad	Swimming	Men's 100m Freestyle S8	25 January
Gold	Muhammad Safwan Suhaimi	Swimming	Men's 50m Backstroke S9	25 January
Gold	Abd Halim Mohammad	Swimming	Men's 50m Breaststroke SB8	25 January
Gold	Carmen Lim	Swimming	Women's 50m Freestyle S8	25 January
Gold	Jennahtul Fahmi Ahmad Jennah; Mohd Hazlin Abdullah	Table Tennis	Men's Doubles TT22	25 January
Gold	Kee Soon Wong; Marcos Hao Hong Chang	Tenpin Bowling	Mixed Doubles TPB9	25 January
Gold	Mohamad Yusshazwan Yusoff	Wheelchair tennis	Men's singles	25 January
Silver	Eljoe Gotuoh	Athletics	Men's Long Jump T20	21 January
Silver	Mohd Arman Rosli	Athletics	Men's Long Jump T38	21 January
Silver	Nani Shahiera Zawawi	Athletics	Women's Long Jump T20	21 January
Silver	Siti Zubaidah Puini	Athletics	Women's Javelin Throw F12	21 January
Silver	Nur Azlia Syafinaz Mohd Zais	Cycling – Road	Women's Time Trial B	21 January
Silver	Wahyu Eqwal Nazrey	Swimming	Men's 50m Backstroke S5	21 January
Silver	Muhammad Nur Syaiful Zulkafli	Swimming	Men's 100m Breaststroke SB4	21 January
Silver	Shahafiq Abdullah	Swimming	Men's 100m Breaststroke SB7	21 January
Silver	Mohd Adib Iqbal Abdullah	Swimming	Men's 200m Breaststroke SB14	21 January
Silver	Carmen Lim	Swimming	Women's 100m Freestyle S8	21 January
Silver	Ong Jia Xuan	Swimming	Women's 100m Breaststroke SB9	21 January
Silver	Mohd Suhairi Abd Kadir	Tenpin Bowling	Men's singles TPB1	21 January
Silver	Rosheedey Faizal Roslan	Tenpin Bowling	Men's Singles TPB8	21 January
Silver	Muhammad Nazmi Nasri	Athletics	Men's 100m T37	22 January
Silver	Eddy Bernard	Athletics	Men's 100m T44	22 January
Silver	Muhammad Ammar Aiman Nor Azmi	Athletics	Men's 400m T20	22 January
Silver	Elissieball Jonal	Athletics	Women's 400m T20	22 January
Silver	Mohammad Yusof Hafizi Shaharuddin	Cycling – Road	Men's Road Race C1–C2	22 January
Silver	Muhammad Nur Syaiful Zulkafli	Swimming	Men's 200m Freestyle S5	22 January
Silver	Rusdianto Rusmadi	Swimming	Men's 100m Backstroke S7–S8	22 January
Silver	Abd Halim Mohammad; Muhammad Safwan Suhaimi; Carmen Lim; Ong Jia Xuan	Swimming	Mixed 4 × 100m Freestyle Relay 34 Pts S1–S10	22 January
Silver	Muhammad Razif Iskandar Abdul Muiz	Tenpin Bowling	Men's singles TPB4	22 January
Silver	Muhammad Azaruddin Mat; Suresh Selvatamby	Archery	Men's Doubles Recurve	23 January
Silver	Muhammad Noorhelmie Mohd Rabi	Athletics	Men's 200m T12	23 January
Silver	Jyayahmurugan Veeramurugan	Athletics	Men's Shot Put F12	23 January
Silver	Mohamad Aliff Mohamad Awi	Athletics	Men's Shot Put F20	23 January
Silver	Mazzdiana Nuratasya Abd Rahim	Athletics	Women's Shot Put F41	23 January
Silver	Doriah Poulus	Athletics	Women's Javelin Throw F64	23 January
Silver	Angeline Melissa Lawas	Boccia	Women's Individual BC1	23 January
Silver	Muhammad Safwan Suhaimi	Swimming	Men's 100m Backstroke S9	23 January
Silver	Ethan Khoo Yin Jun	Swimming	Men's 200m Individual Medley SM14	23 January
Silver	Rusdianto Rusmadi; Muhammad Safwan Suhaimi; Carmen Lim; Ong Jia Xuan	Swimming	Mixed 4 × 100m Medley Relay 34 Pts S1–S10	23 January
Silver	Marcos Chang Hao Hong	Tenpin Bowling	Men's Singles TPB9	23 January
Silver	Ruzila Mustafa	Tenpin Bowling	Women's Singles TPB8	23 January
Silver	Daneshen Govinda Rajan; Wiro Julin	Archery	Men's Doubles Compound	24 January
Silver	Muhammmad Haqeem Mustaqim Husmadi	Athletics	Men's 800m T20	24 January
Silver	Eddy Bernard	Athletics	Men's Long Jump T42–T44–T63	24 January
Silver	Muhammad Amirul Alif Abdul Raof	Athletics	Men's Shot Put F55	24 January
Silver	Charmian Sikajat	Athletics	Women's Shot Put F20	24 January
Silver	Siti Maisarah Mat Lawani	Badminton	Women's Singles SL3	24 January
Silver	Zuhairie Ahmad Tarmizi	Cycling – Track	Men's 1000m Time Trial C3–C5	24 January
Silver	Bryan Junency Gustin	Powerlifting	Men's –88kg	24 January
Silver	Rusdianto Rusmadi	Swimming	Men's 200m Individual Medley SM7–SM8	24 January
Silver	Nur Syaiful Zulkafli; Wahyu Eqwal Nazrey; Brenda Anellia Larry; Sharlinie Voo	Swimming	Mixed 4 × 50m Medley Relay 20 Pts S1–S10	24 January
Silver	Muhammad Haqeem Mustaqim Husmadi	Athletics	Men's 1500m T20	25 January
Silver	Muhammad Faiz Haizat Rosdi	Athletics	Men's 1500m T37–T38	25 January
Silver	Ahmad Zuaiman Shamsuddin	Athletics	Men's Long Jump T12	25 January
Silver	Umi Syuhadah Idris	Athletics	Women's Javelin Throw F37	25 January
Silver	Doriah Poulus	Athletics	Women's Shot Put F44	25 January
Silver	Cheah Liek Hou	Badminton	Men's singles SU5	25 January
Silver	Muhammad Ikhwan Ramli	Badminton	Men's singles WH1	25 January
Silver	Cheah Liek Hou; Mohamad Faris Ahmad Azri	Badminton	Men's doubles SU5	25 January
Silver	Malaysia's blind football team	Blind football	Men's team	25 January
Silver	Ahmad Ahlami Mohammad	Cycling – Track	Men's Sprint B	25 January
Silver	Nur Suraiya Muhamad Zamri	Cycling – Track	Women's Sprint B	25 January
Silver	Mohd Faiz Hussain	Powerlifting	Men's +107kg	25 January
Silver	Muhammad Nur Syaiful Zulkafli	Swimming	Men's 100m Freestyle S5	25 January
Silver	Duran Yaspi Imam Basori	Swimming	Men's 200m Butterfly S14	25 January
Silver	Rusdianto Rusmadi	Swimming	Men's 50m Backstroke S8	25 January
Silver	Carmen Lim	Swimming	Women's 50m Breaststroke SB8	25 January
Silver	Ethan Khoo Yin Jun	Swimming	Men's 400m Individual Medley SM14	25 January
Silver	Ong Jia Xuan	Swimming	Women's 50m Breaststroke SB9	25 January
Silver	Nadia Syafika Abd Rahman; Mohd Azrin Rahim	Tenpin Bowling	Mixed Doubles TPB9	25 January
Silver	Mohd Fauzi Md Ghazali; Muhamad Amin Abd Rashid	Tenpin Bowling	Mixed Doubles TPB10	25 January
Bronze	Nik Mohamad Rahmat Mohd Zahari	Athletics	Men's Long Jump T20	21 January
Bronze	Mohd Shahmil Md Saad	Athletics	Men's Shot Put F56	21 January
Bronze	Badrul Hisam Musa	Athletics	Men's Javelin Throw F12–F13	21 January
Bronze	Heronlee Wong	Athletics	Men's Javelin Throw F37	21 January
Bronze	Rozabell Rozell Parinus	Athletics	Women's 100m T36–T37–T38	21 January
Bronze	Elissieball Jonal	Athletics	Women's Long Jump T20	21 January
Bronze	Mazzdiana Nuratasya Abd Rahim	Athletics	Women's Discus Throw F40–F41	21 January
Bronze	Hemala Devi Eni Kutty	Athletics	Women's Javelin Throw F12	21 January
Bronze	Mohd Adib Iqbal Abdullah	Swimming	Men's 100m Breaststroke SB14	21 January
Bronze	Shahafiq Abdullah	Swimming	Men's 200m Breaststroke SB7	21 January
Bronze	Saiful Rizal Abdullah	Swimming	Men's 200m Breaststroke SB14	21 January
Bronze	Brenda Anellia Larry	Swimming	Women's 50m Backstroke S4–S5	21 January
Bronze	Carmen Lim	Swimming	Women's 100m Breaststroke SB7–SB8	21 January
Bronze	Aleeya Fariesya Faizul Rizal	Swimming	Women's 200m Breaststroke SB14	21 January
Bronze	Muhammad Nur Syaiful Zulkafli; Wahyu Eqwal Nazrey; Brenda Anellia Larry; Sharlinie Valerie Wen Qin Woo	Swimming	Mixed 4 x 50m Freestyle Relay 20 Pts S1–S10	21 January
Bronze	Muhamad Atib Zakaria; Muhammad Azzwar Hassan Asaari; Muhmmad Hafiz Ramli; Muhammad Roozaimi Johari; Razali Cantik	Wheelchair Basketball	Men's 3x3 Team	21 January
Bronze	Firdaus Shukor	Wheelchair Fencing	Men's Individual Épée B	21 January
Bronze	Muhammad Noorhelmie Mohd Rabi	Athletics	Men's 100m T12	22 January
Bronze	Muhamad Ashraf Muhammad Haisham	Athletics	Men's 1500m T46	22 January
Bronze	Adderin Majurin	Athletics	Men's Shot Put F34	22 January
Bronze	Noorhaslin Rosidi Sabri	Athletics	Women's Long Jump T12	22 January
Bronze	Umi Syuhadah Idris	Athletics	Women's Shot Put F37	22 January
Bronze	Catalina Sunti David Diok	Athletics	Women's Discus Throw F11	22 January
Bronze	Ahmad Rafie Muhd Jul	Cycling – Road	Men's Road Race B	22 January
Bronze	Zuhairie Ahmad Tarmizi	Cycling – Road	Men's Road Race C3–C5	22 January
Bronze	Muhammad Zhafri Adam Mohd Azmi	Swimming	Men's 200m Freestyle S14	22 January
Bronze	Wahyu Eqwal Nazrey	Swimming	Men's 100m Backstroke S5	22 January
Bronze	Ethan Khoo Yin Jun	Swimming	Men's 100m Backstroke S14	22 January
Bronze	Bryan Lau Sze Kai; Ethan Khoo Yin Jun; Aleeya Fariesya Faizul Rizal; Asyiil Raziin Razman	Swimming	Mixed 4 × 100m Freestyle Relay S14	22 January
Bronze	Firdaus Shukor	Wheelchair Fencing	Men's Individual Foil B	22 January
Bronze	Nur Hidayah Badaruddin	Wheelchair Fencing	Women's Individual Épée B	22 January
Bronze	Suresh Selvatamby	Archery	Men's Individual Recurve	23 January
Bronze	Muhammad Faiz Haizat Rosdi	Athletics	Men's 400m T36–T38	23 January
Bronze	Muhammad Amirul Alif Abdul Raof	Athletics	Men's Discus Throw F55	23 January
Bronze	Anis Avrinda	Boccia	Women's Individual BC2	23 January
Bronze	Muhammad Zhafri Adam Mohd Azmi	Swimming	Men's 100m Freestyle S14	23 January
Bronze	Wahyu Eqwal Nazrey	Swimming	Men's 100m Butterfly S5	23 January
Bronze	Duran Yaspi Imam Basori	Swimming	Men's 100m Butterfly S14	23 January
Bronze	Ethan Khoo Yin Jun; Nik Muhammad Joe Asyraff Nik Rafizal; Aleeya Fariesya Faizul Rizal; Asyiil Raziin Razman	Swimming	Mixed 4 × 100m Medley Relay 34 Pts S14	23 January
Bronze	Muhamad Lizan Mat Sittim	Table Tennis	Men's Singles TT3	23 January
Bronze	Mohd Hazlin Abdullah	Table Tennis	Men's Singles TT11	23 January
Bronze	Julieyati Abd Jalal	Tenpin Bowling	Women's Singles TPB8	23 January
Bronze	Muhammad Noorhelmie Mohd Rabi	Athletics	Men's 400m T12	24 January
Bronze	Muhammad Mukrim Razman	Athletics	Men's 800m T20	24 January
Bronze	Siti Noraidah Suherman	Athletics	Women's Shot Put F20	24 January
Bronze	Umi Syuhadah Idris	Athletics	Women's Discus throw F37	24 January
Bronze	Ahmad Zharif Ahmad Nazri	Cycling – Track	Men's 1000m Time Trial C3–C5	24 January
Bronze	Mohd Khairul Hazwan Wahab	Cycling – Track	Men's 1000m Time Trial B	24 January
Bronze	Naimul Amal Haji Othman	Judo	Men's –64 kg J1/J2	24 January
Bronze	Mohd Fauzan Ramlan	Powerlifting	Men's –107kg	24 January
Bronze	Nur Syaiful Zulkafli	Swimming	Men's 50m Freestyle S5	24 January
Bronze	Ethan Khoo Yin JUn	Swimming	Men's 400m Freestyle S14	24 January
Bronze	Duran Yaspi Imam Basori	Swimming	Men's 200m Backstroke S14	24 January
Bronze	Brenda Anellia Larry	Swimming	Women's 50m Freestyle S4–S5	24 January
Bronze	Aleeya Fariesya Faizul Rizal	Swimming	Women's 100m Breaststroke SB14	24 January
Bronze	Firdaus Shukor; Noazizan Mohamad; Nur Hidayah Badaruddin; Nurul Khalijah Mohd Azlan Shah	Wheelchair Fencing	Mixed Team Foil	24 January
Bronze	Mohamad Dinihakimi Nordin; Krisana Sriujun; Nur Hidayah Badaruddin; Nurul Khalijah Mohd Azlan Shah>	Wheelchair Fencing	Mixed Team Sabre	24 January
Bronze	Faizatul Ahya Abdullah Thani	Wheelchair Tennis	Women's Singles	24 January
Bronze	Muhamad Nurdin Ibrahim	Athletics	Men's 1500m T20	25 January
Bronze	Muhammad Nazri Hazim Mohan	Athletics	Men's Long Jump T12	25 January
Bronze	Tomson Lim Kok Hong	Athletics	Men's Shot Put F37	25 January
Bronze	Muhammad Amin Azmi	Badminton	Men's singles SH6	25 January
Bronze	Amyrul Yazid Ahmad Sibi	Badminton	Men's singles SU5	25 January
Bronze	Noor Azwan Noorlan	Badminton	Men's singles WH12	25 January
Bronze	Chee Hoong Lee; Avrinda Anis; Angeline Melissa Lawas	Boccia	Mixed doubles BC1–2	25 January
Bronze	Nur Izzati Zakaria; Nur Feiqha Maulad Mohamed Halil	Chess	Women's team Rapid B2/3	25 January
Bronze	Muhammad Safwan Suhaimi	Swimming	Men's 100m Freestyle S9	25 January
Bronze	Abd Halim Mohammad; Rusdianto Rusmadi; Shahafiq Abdullah; Muhammad Safwan Suhaimi	Swimming	Men's 4x100m Medley Relay S1–S10	25 January
Bronze	Chao Ming Chee; Brady Zi Rong Chin	Table Tennis	Men's Doubles TT18	25 January
Bronze	Nurul Nasuha Mohd Anuar; Gloria Gracia Wong Sze	Table Tennis	Women's Doubles TT20	25 January
Bronze	Malaysia's wheelchair basketball team	Wheelchair basketball	Men's team 5x5	25 January
Bronze	Abu Samah Borhan	Wheelchair tennis	Men's singles	25 January
Bronze	Mohamad Yusshazwan Yusoff; Abu Samah Borhan	Wheelchair tennis	Men's doubles	25 January
