= 2025 ASEAN Para Games =

Multi-sport event for athletes with disabilities in Nakhon Ratchasima, Thailand

13th ASEAN Para Games
- Host city: Nakhon Ratchasima, Thailand
- Motto: Create Pride Together (Thai: สร้างความภูมิใจไปด้วยกัน, Sang Khwam Phumchai Pi Duaikan)
- Nations: 10
- Events: 536 in 19 sports
- Opening: 20 January 2026
- Closing: 26 January 2026
- Opened by: Chalermsuk Yugala; Representative of the King of Thailand
- Torch lighter: Saysunee Jana
- Main venue: 80th Birthday Stadium
- Website: aseanparagames2025.com

The 2025 ASEAN Para Games, (Note: Thai: กีฬาอาเซียนพาราเกมส์ 2025, (Note: For official documents, it should be written as กีฬาอาเซียนพาราเกมส์ ๒๐๒๕ using Thai numerals) RTGS: Kila Asian Pharakem 2025, pronounced [kīː.lāː ʔāː.sîan pʰāː.rāː.kēːm sɔ̌ːŋ.pʰān.jîː.sìp̚.hâː]) officially called the 13th ASEAN Para Games (Note: Thai: กีฬาอาเซียนพาราเกมส์ ครั้งที่ 13, (Note: กีฬาอาเซียนพาราเกมส์ ครั้งที่ ๑๓ using Thai numerals) RTGS: Kila Asian Pharakem Khrangthi 13, pronounced [kīː.lāː ʔāː.sîan pʰāː.rāː.kēːm kʰráŋ.tîː sǎːm.sìp̚ sǎːm]) and commonly known as Thailand 2025, was an international multi-sport event for athletes with disabilities, sanctioned by the ASEAN Para Sports Federation (APSF). The event took place from 20 to 26 January 2026 in Nakhon Ratchasima Province, Thailand.

The province was awarded the Games on 13 January 2023. This marks the first time that host city was selected through a new bidding and election process for the ASEAN Para Games.

The 2025 ASEAN Para Games were the second time Thailand has hosted the event, with Nakhon Ratchasima having previously hosted in 2008.

== Host selection ==
It is customary for the host nation of the SEA Games to concurrently host the ASEAN Para Games within the same year, reflecting a commitment to inclusivity and equal opportunities for athletes with disabilities.

=== Bidding and election ===
On 11 October 2022, Chaipak Siriwat, the Vice President of the National Olympic Committee of Thailand (NOCT), revealed the framework for the bidding process for the 2025 SEA Games. He emphasised that the host cities or provinces should aim to organise the Games at a budget-friendly cost and that there would be no requirement to build new venues. Unlike the 2019 and 2021 editions, where competition venues were spread across 23 and 12 cities respectively, the number of host cities for the 2025 Games would be limited to 3 or 4.

In October 2022, Prachum Boontiem, the Vice Governor of the Sports Authority of Thailand (SAT), nominated eight bidding parties from twelve cities or provinces interested in hosting the 2025 SEA Games. The city Bangkok as well as the provinces of Chiang Mai, Nakhon Ratchasima, and Songkhla submitted sole bids, while Bangkok, Chonburi, Songkhla, Krabi, Phuket, Trat, Amnat Charoen, Sisaket, Ubon Ratchathani, and Yasothon were proposed as potential bidding provinces.

Although the official bidding process began in October 2022, some regions had already revealed their bidding campaigns earlier: Ubon Ratchathani in April 2016, Chonburi in January 2019, and Krabi, Phuket, and Trang in February 2021.

On 13 January 2023, the Sports Authority of Thailand (SAT) selected three provinces—Bangkok Metropolitan Region, Chonburi province, and Songkhla province—to host the 33rd SEA Games, while Nakhon Ratchasima province was chosen to host the 13th ASEAN Para Games. This decision was approved by the Cabinet of Thailand in February 2023. These four cities were the first in SEA Games and ASEAN Para Games history to be chosen through a bidding process.

Bidding Parties for 33rd SEA Games and 13th ASEAN Para Games
Sole bids (4)	Cross-province bids (4)
Bangkok; Chiang Mai; Nakhon Ratchasima (13th ASEAN Para Games); Songkhla	Bangkok and Chonburi; Bangkok, Chonburi and Songkhla (33rd SEA Games); Krabi, Phuket and Trang; Amnat Charoen, Sisaket, Ubon Ratchathani, and Yasothon

== Handover ceremony ==
As per tradition, the handover ceremony of the ASEAN Para Sports Federation (APSF) flag and the artistic performance for the 2025 ASEAN Para Games took place during the closing ceremony of the 2023 ASEAN Para Games in Phnom Penh, Cambodia, on 9 June 2023 at the Morodok Techo National Stadium.

First, the APSF flag was passed from Vath Chamroeun, the Secretary General of the Cambodia ASEAN Games Organizing Committee (CAMAPGOC), Thong Khon, the Vice President of CAMAPGOC, and Hun Many, the Vice President of the National Paralympic Committee of Cambodia (NPCC), to Osoth Bhavilai, the President of APSF, Naiyanobh Bhirombhakdi the President of the Paralympic Committee of Thailand (PCT), Phipat Ratchakitprakarn, Minister of Tourism and Sports (MOTS), and Gongsak Yodmani, the Governor of the Sports Authority of Thailand (SAT). Other delegates at the handover ceremony included Cherdkiat Atthakor, the Thai Ambassador to Cambodia; Charin Thongsuk, the Deputy Governor of Nakhon Ratchasima Province; Prachum Boonthiam, the Deputy Governor of SAT; and Khemphol Uittayakul, Secretary to MOTS. This was followed by the raising of the Thai flag and the playing of its national anthem.

The artistic performance for this segment, titled Friendship Highway, inspired by Mittraphap Road, the main road of Nakhon Ratchasima and Isaan, was performed by Kampan Nithivorapaiboon, the National Artist in Performing Arts from Nakhon Ratchasima, and the cheerleading team of Nonthaburi School for the Deaf.

== Kick-off ceremony ==
The kick-off ceremony for the 2025 SEA Games and the 2026 ASEAN Para Games was held at the Hua Mak Sports Complex in Bangkok on 7 December 2024. The event was attended by Sorawong Thienthong, Chairman of the Organizing Committee and Minister of Tourism and Sports (MOTS), along with Gongsak Yodmani, Governor of the Sports Authority of Thailand (SAT), representatives from the National Olympic Committee of Thailand (NOCT), the Paralympic Committee of Thailand (PCT), and various national sports associations.

The event also featured renowned athletes, including Vareeraya Sukasem, an Olympic skateboarder, and Saysunee Jana, a five-time Paralympic gold medalist in wheelchair fencing. Additionally, several celebrities joined the occasion, such as Matthew Deane, Khemanit Jamikorn, James Fagerlund, and Nakorn Silachai.

Sorawong announced that the 2025 SEA Games and the 2026 ASEAN Para Games will be held under the themes of Green SEA Games and Sustainable Para Games. The games aim to achieve net-zero emissions by promoting eco-friendly transportation, utilising sustainable products, and selecting venues that prioritise environmental protection. This environmentally friendly vision will also be implemented in the 2025 FIVB Women's Volleyball World Championship, scheduled for August earlier in the year.

== Development and preparations ==
=== Venues ===
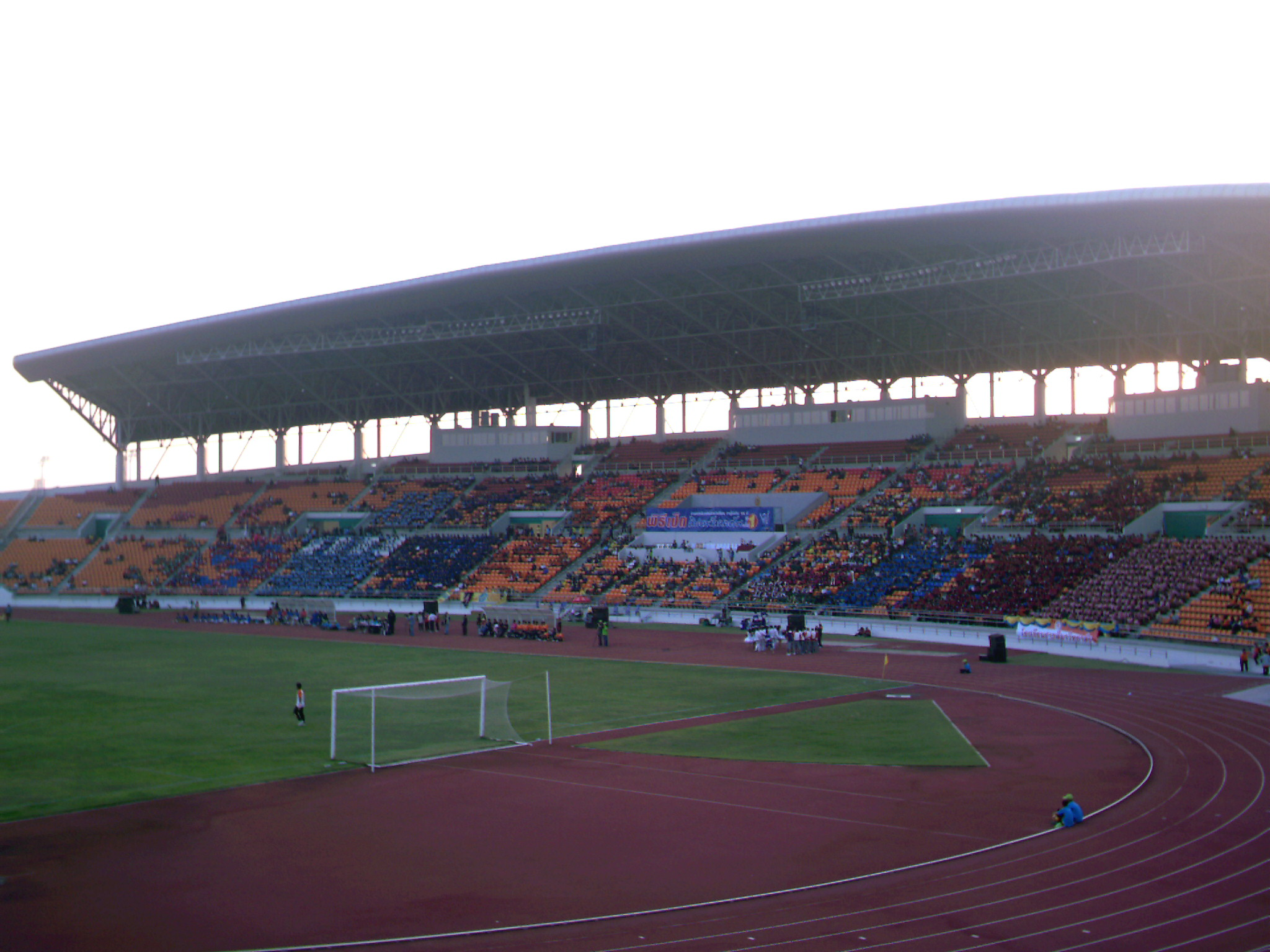
HM The King's 80th Birthday Anniversary Stadium, Nakhon Ratchasima Sports Complex

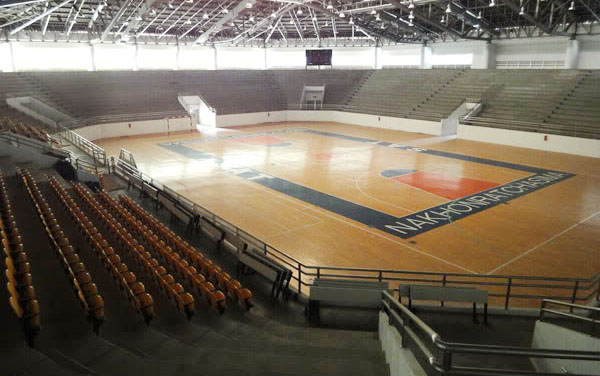
Chatchai Hall, Nakhon Ratchasima Sports Complex

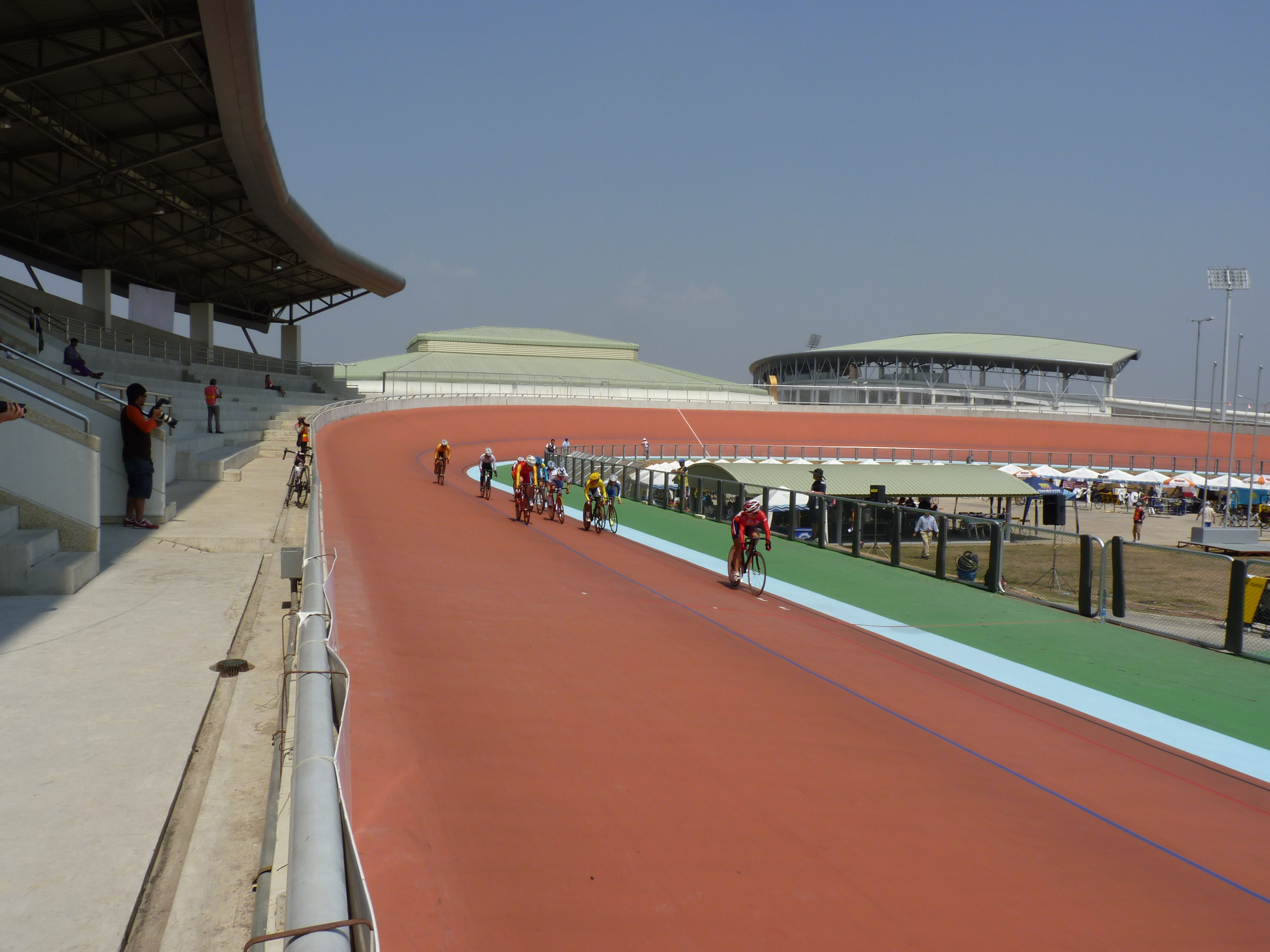
Velodrome, Nakhon Ratchasima Sports Complex

The 2025 ASEAN Para Games will utilise existing venues across Nakhon Ratchasima province, including those used by the 2007 SEA Games, the 2008 ASEAN Para Games, the 2023 World Abilitysport Games, and 2024 World Abilitysport Youth Games. The latter two events, governed by World Abilitysport, are the largest multi-sport events after the Paralympic Games for athletes who use wheelchairs, amputees, and those with neurological conditions, particularly cerebral palsy. The only exception is ten-pin bowling, which will be held at an outlying venue in Bangkok due to the lack of a suitable competition venue in Nakhon Ratchasima.

Venue	Events
Pru Yai Township, Mueang Nakhon Ratchasima, Nakhon Ratchasima
HM The King's 80th Birthday Anniversary Stadium, Nakhon Ratchasima Sports Complex	Athletics, Ceremonies
Chatchai Hall, Nakhon Ratchasima Sports Complex	Boccia
Liptapanlop Hall, Nakhon Ratchasima Sports Complex	Sitting volleyball
Aquatic Center, Nakhon Ratchasima Sports Complex	Swimming
Archery Field, Nakhon Ratchasima Sports Complex	Archery
Shooting Range, Nakhon Ratchasima Sports Complex	Shooting
Tennis Court, Nakhon Ratchasima Sports Complex	Wheelchair tennis
Velodrome, Nakhon Ratchasima Sports Complex	Cycling (track cycling)
SPDAT Convention Center, Nakhon Ratchasima Sports Complex	Badminton
Suranaree Township, Mueang Nakhon Ratchasima, Nakhon Ratchasima
Suranaree University of Technology	Cycling (road cycling)
Nakhon Ratchasima City, Mueang Nakhon Ratchasima, Nakhon Ratchasima
MCC Hall, The Mall Korat	Judo, wheelchair fencing
Terminal Hall, Terminal 21 Korat Mall	Wheelchair basketball
Center Point Korat Hotel	Powerlifting
Nakhon Ratchasima Rajabhat University	Chess, CP football
Korat Hall, Central Korat Mall	Table tennis
Lady Mo Monument Courtyard	Ceremonies sub-venue
Din Daeng, Bangkok
Blu-O Rhythm & Bowl, The Esplanade Ratchada Mall	Bowling

=== Steering and Organizing Committees for the Games ===
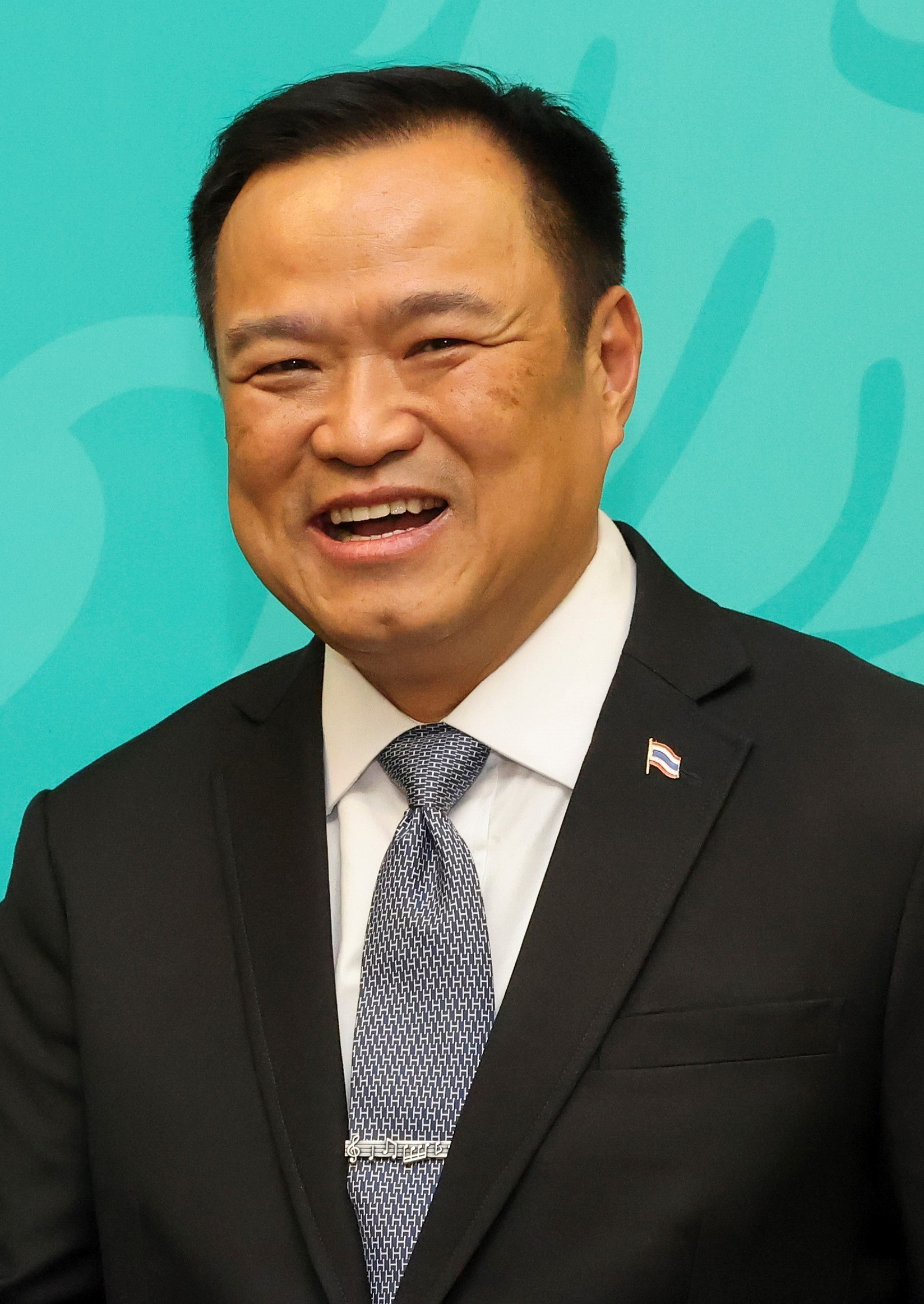
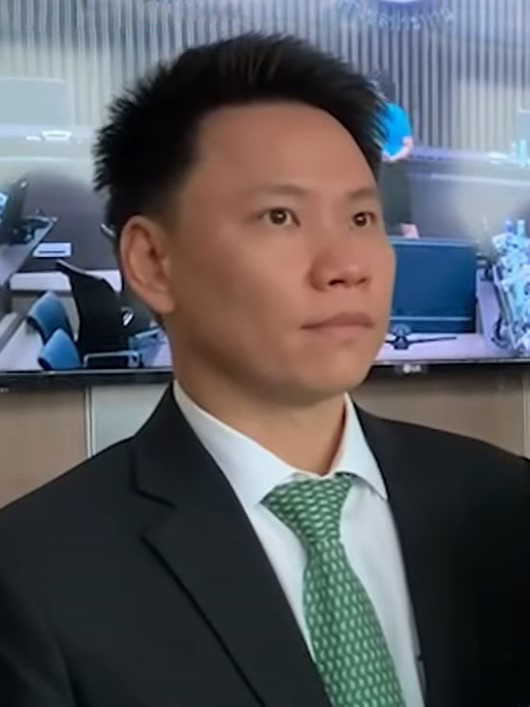
Current chairman: Prime Minister Anutin Charnvirakul (Steering) and Atthakorn Sirilatthayakorn (Organizing).

Similar to the 2007 SEA Games and the 2008 ASEAN Para Games in Nakhon Ratchasima, the committees for the competition are divided into two main bodies. The Steering Committee, chaired by the Prime Minister of Thailand, is responsible for setting policies, providing recommendations, and allocating budgets to the Organizing Committee. Meanwhile, the Olympic Organizing Committee, chaired by the Minister of Tourism and Sports (MOTS), is tasked with managing the operations of the competition, coordinating with various subcommittees, and overseeing the budget allocated by the Steering Committee.

In December 2024, the Steering Committee recognised the organisational structure of the Organizing Committee for the Games. Unlike the previous games, the chairpersons of the subcommittees are all from the Ministry of Tourism and Sports (MOTS) and the Sports Authority of Thailand (SAT), with no representatives from the National Olympic Committee of Thailand (NOCT).

Committee	Chairperson	Term of office
Steering Committee for the Games	Paetongtarn Shinawatra	2024 – 2025
Steering Committee for the Games	Anutin Charnvirakul	2025 –
Organizing Committee for the Games (THAISOC) (Note: It stands for the Thailand SEA Games Organizing Committee.)	Sorawong Thienthong	2024 – 2025
Organizing Committee for the Games (THAISOC)	Atthakorn Sirilatthayakorn	2025 –
Main committee in the Organizing Committee	Chairperson	Term of office
Secretariat and International Coordination Committee	Gongsak Yodmani	2024 –
Competition Management Executive Committee	Meechai Inwood	2024 –
Support and Services Committee	Siraphop Duangsodsri	2024 –
Sports Technical Committee	Preecha Lalun	2024 –

=== Budget ===
The initial estimated budget for the 2025 SEA Games and the 2025 ASEAN Para Games is ฿2.055 billion. The funding for the events will come from several sources: ฿1.683 billion is being requested from the government budget. Additional revenue includes ฿20 million from sponsorships and ฿180 million from goods and services, such as sports equipment and beverages. Ticket sales are expected to generate ฿20 million. Registration fees for the SEA Games will contribute ฿134.40 million, while registration fees for the ASEAN Para Games will bring in ฿16.80 million.

The budget for these events is lower than the cost of the 1998 Asian Games, which was ฿2.372 billion, but higher than the 2007 Summer Universiade, which amounted to ฿1.843 billion. Meanwhile, the costs for the 2007 SEA Games and the 2008 ASEAN Para Games were ฿1.463 billion.

== The Games ==
=== Opening ceremony ===
The opening ceremony of the 2025 ASEAN Para Games was held on 20 January 2026 at 80th Birthday Stadium and was officially opened by Prince Chalermsuk Yugala, the representative of King Vajiralongkorn.

=== Sports ===
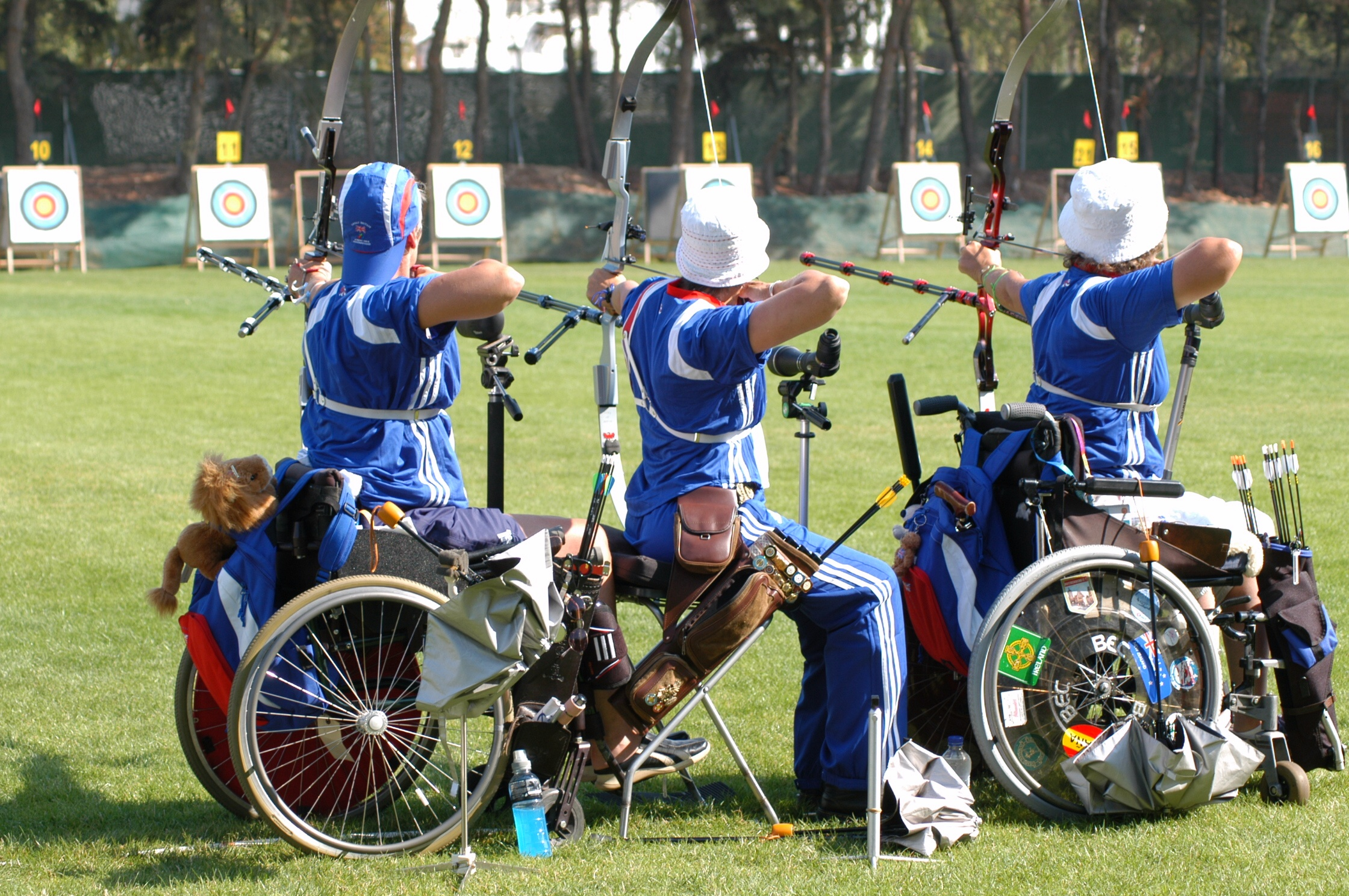
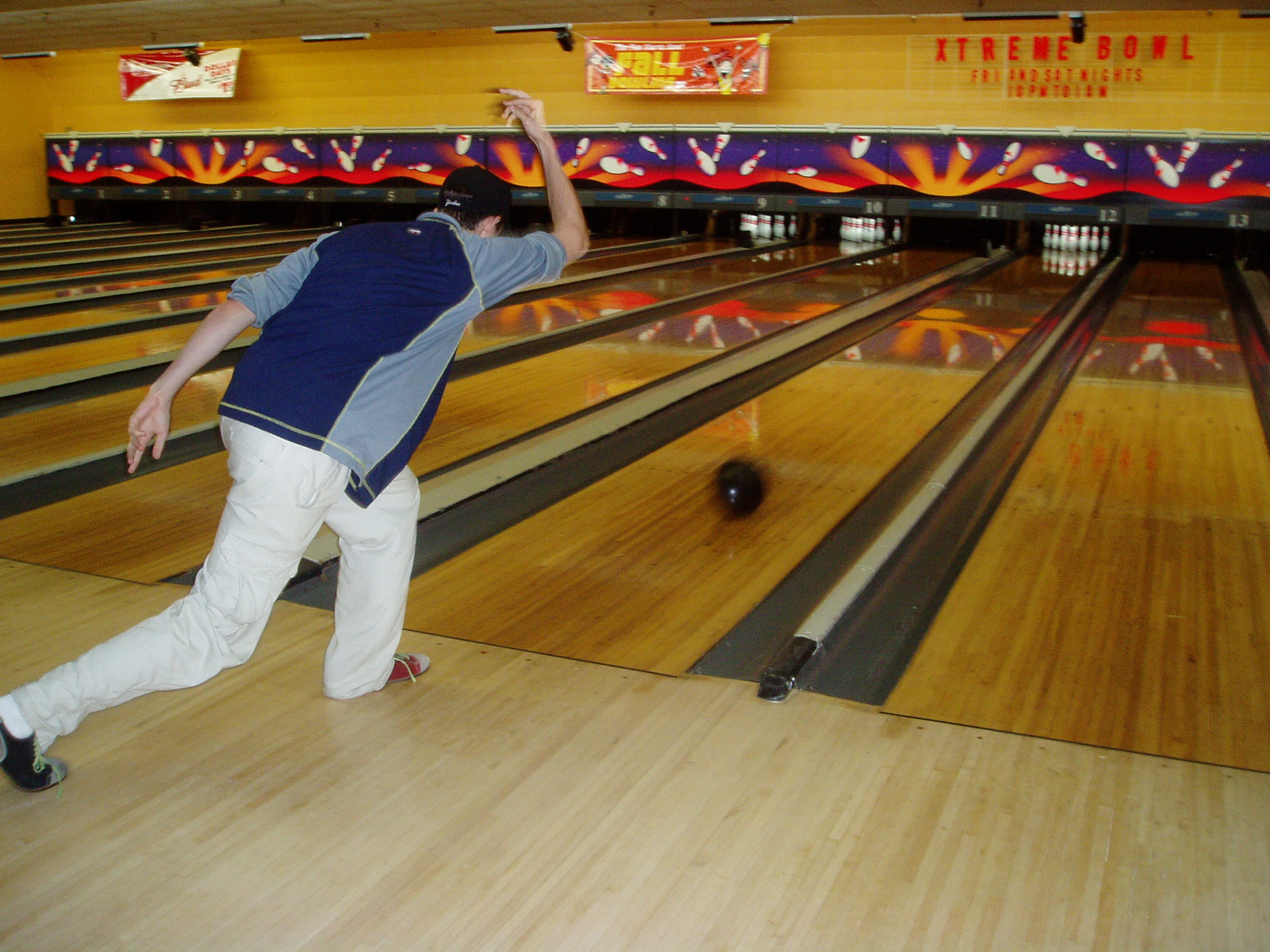
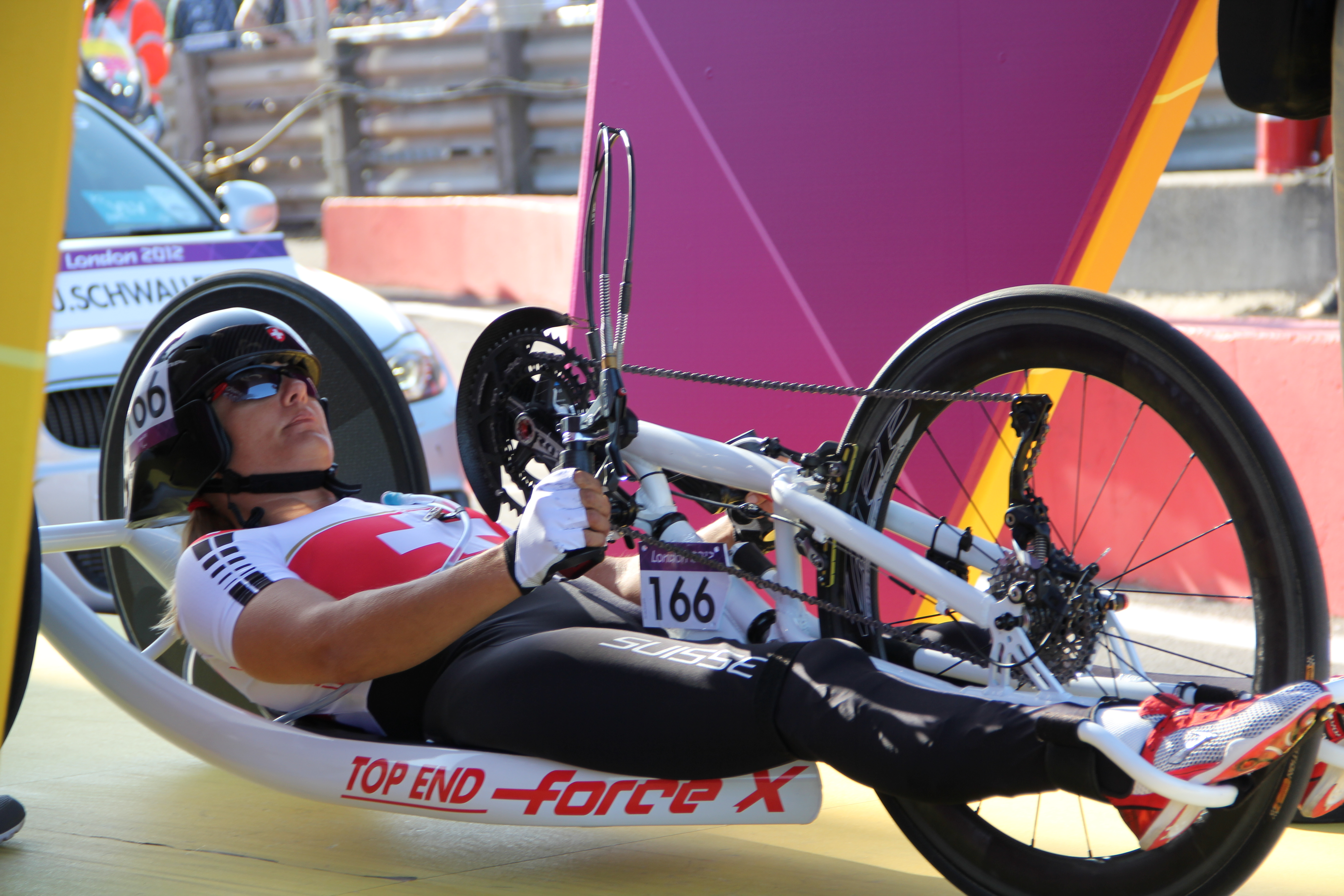
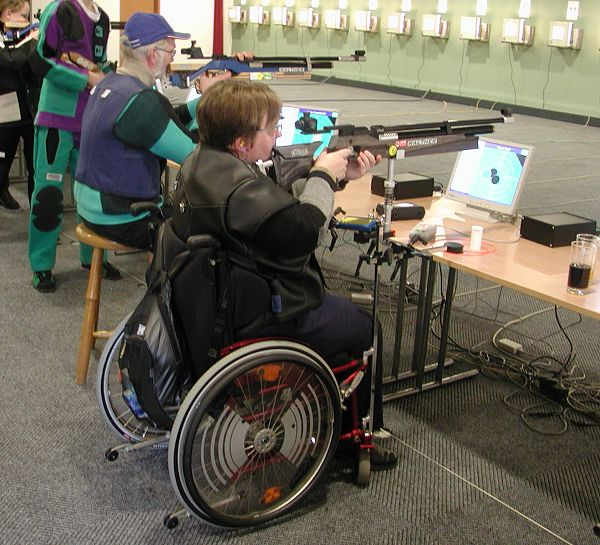
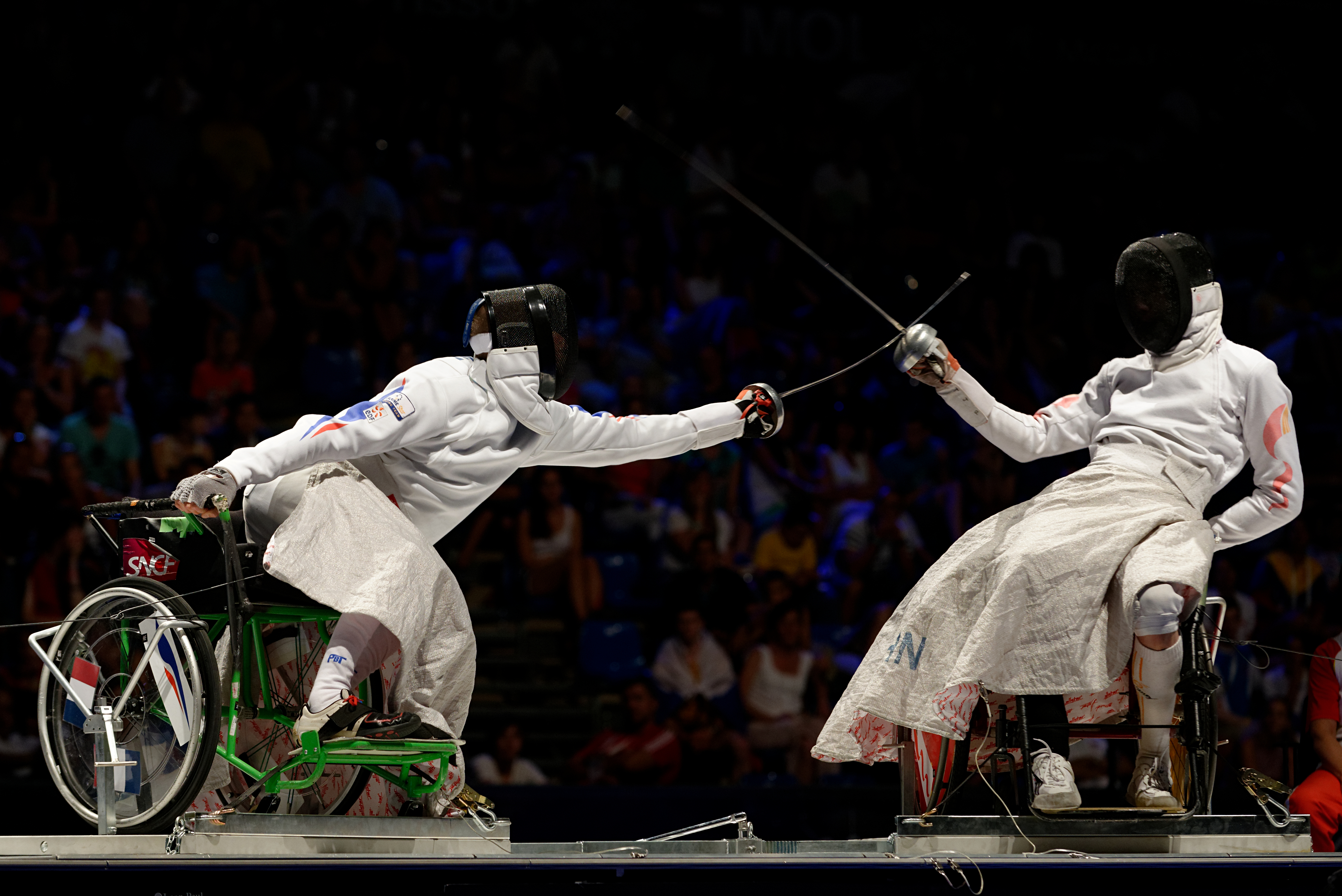
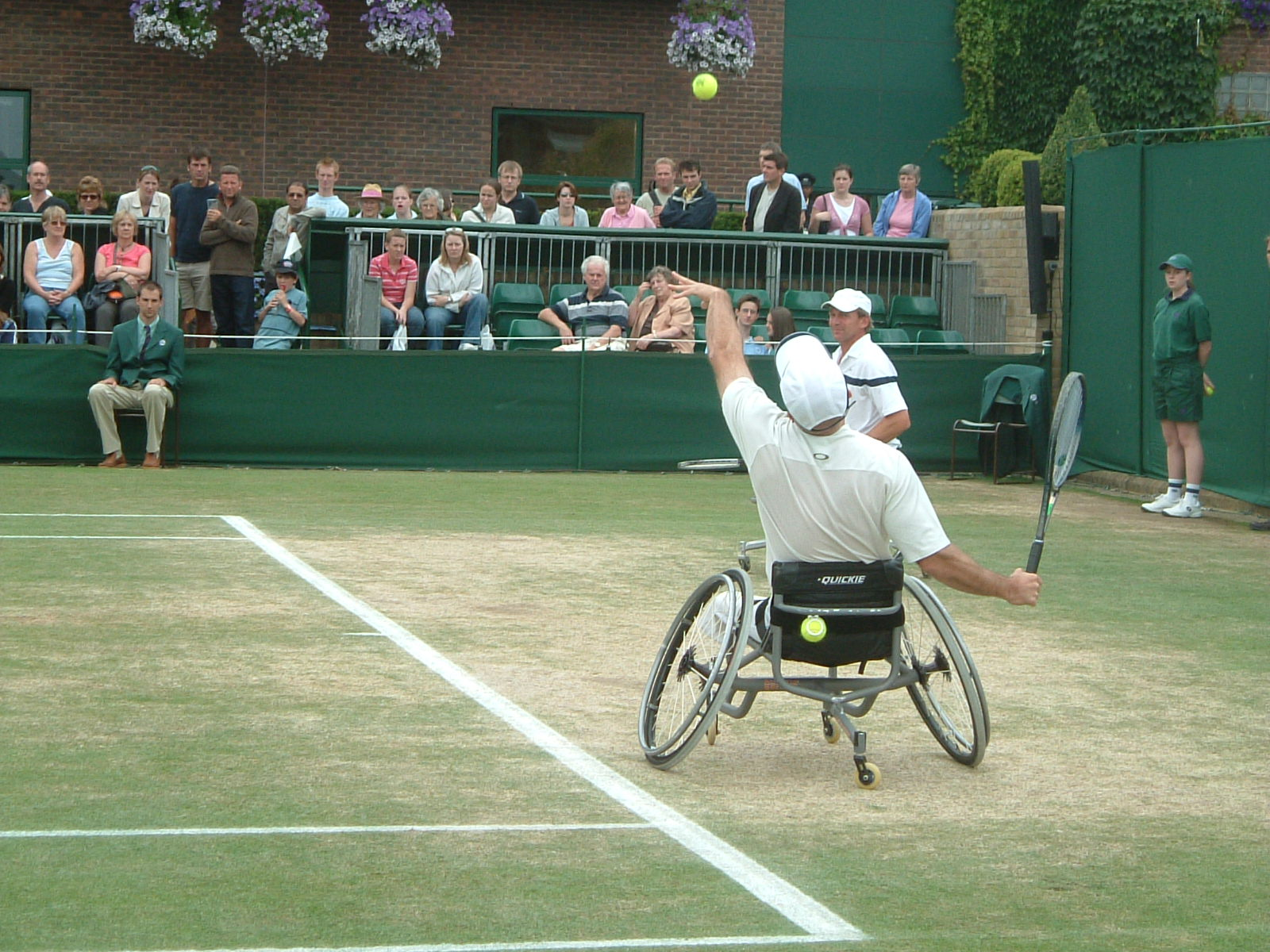
Eight of six returns: para-archery, para-bowling, para-cycling, para-shooting wheelchair fencing, and wheelchair tennis.

During the ASEAN Para Sports Federation (APSF) workshop in March 2024, the organising committee proposed a sports programme featuring twenty sports, exceeding the previous record of sixteen set at the 2017 ASEAN Para Games in Kuala Lumpur, Malaysia. Later, para-bowling was removed due to the lack of available venues in the host city. Additionally, two more sports will be included as demonstration sports. Nevertheless, para-bowling was reinstated, with the decision made to host the competition in Bangkok.

Wheelchair fencing and para-shooting made their return, having last been included in 2008 and 2015, respectively. Para-cycling and para-bowling also returned, having last been featured in 2017. Para-archery and wheelchair tennis returned as well, having last been included in 2022.

Esports was initially set to debut at the 2025 ASEAN Para Games. However, during the 34th APSF Executive Committee meeting in March 2025, the organising committee decided to remove it from the sports programme. As a result, these Games now feature nineteen sports with a total of 536 events, making it the largest ASEAN Para Games in history. This breaks the previous record of 488 events set at the 2008 ASEAN Para Games, which was also held in Nakhon Ratchasima, Thailand.

The nineteen-sport program of the 2025 ASEAN Para Games includes 16 out of the 22 core Paralympic sports, with the exclusion of para-equestrian, para-canoeing, para-climbing, para-rowing, para-triathlon, para-taekwondo, and wheelchair rugby. Additionally, it includes bowling, chess and football 7-a-side.

Wheelchair rugby and lawn bowls were demonstration events.

Numbers in parentheses indicate the number of medal events contested in each discipline.

2025 ASEAN Para Games sports programme (medal events)

- Archery (7)
- Athletics (149)
- Badminton (12)
- Blind football (1)
- Boccia (9)
- Bowling (14)
- Chess (36)
- CP football (1)
- Cycling
  - Road (16)
  - Track (11)
- Goalball (2)
- Judo (7)
- Powerlifting (18)
- Shooting (14)
- Sitting volleyball (1)
- Swimming (132)
- Table tennis (34)
- Wheelchair basketball
  - 3x3 wheelchair basketball (2)
  - Wheelchair basketball (2)
- Wheelchair fencing (15)
- Wheelchair tennis (3)

=== Closing ceremony ===
The closing ceremony of the 2025 ASEAN Para Games was held on 20 January 2026 at 80th Birthday Stadium. The APSF flag was handed over to Malaysia, the host country of the 2027 edition.

== Participating National Paralympic Committees ==
All eleven National Paralympic Committee (NPC) members of the Southeast Asian Games Federation (SEAGF) were expected to take part in the games. Since its debut in 2003, Timor-Leste will participate for the first time as a full ASEAN member state, with its official accession to the association occurring in 2025.

Cambodia withdrew from the ASEAN Para Games due to "unforeseen circumstances". It previously entered 103 athletes in 12 sports. Cambodia also withdrew from the 2025 SEA Games last month, a move linked to the 2025 Cambodian–Thai border crisis.

Numbers in parentheses indicate the number of athletes representing in each NPC.

Participating National Paralympic Committees

- Brunei (12)
- Indonesia (290)
- Laos (70)
- Malaysia (222)
- Myanmar (97)
- Philippines (211)
- Singapore (37)
- Thailand (441) (host)
- Timor-Leste (23)
- Vietnam (137)

== Calendar ==
In the following calendar for the 2025 ASEAN Para Games, each blue box represents an event competition, such as a qualification round, on that day. The yellow boxes represent days during which medal-awarding finals for a sport were held. On the left, the calendar lists each sport with events held during the Games, and at the right how many gold medals were won in that sport. There is a key at the top of the calendar to aid the reader.

All times and dates use Thailand Standard Time (UTC+7)

OC	Opening ceremony	●	Event competitions	1	Gold medal events	CC	Closing ceremony

January 2026		19th Mon	20th Tue	21st Wed	22nd Thu	23rd Fri	24th Sat	25th Sun	26th Mon	Events
Ceremonies			OC						CC	—N/a
Archery				●	●	3	2	2		7
Athletics				33	33	34	31	18		149
Badminton				●	●	●	3	9		12
Blind football				●	●	●		1		1
Boccia				●	●	8	●	1		9
Bowling				3	2	3	3	3		14
Chess				●	●	12	●	24		36
CP football		●		●	●	●	●	1		1
Cycling	Road cycling			8	8					16
Cycling	Track cycling						5	6		11
Goalball				●	●	●	●	2		2
Judo					2	2	3			7
Powerlifting				3	3	4	5	3		18
Shooting				4	2	3	3	2		14
Sitting volleyball				●	●	●	●	1		1
Swimming				29	23	26	29	25		132
Table tennis				●	●	21	6	7		34
Wheelchair basketball		●		2	●	●	●	2		4
Wheelchair fencing				4	4	4	3			15
Wheelchair tennis				●	●	●	1	2		3
Daily medal events		0	0	86	77	120	94	109	0	536
Cumulative total		0	0	86	163	283	377	536	536	536
January 2026		19th Mon	20th Tue	21st Wed	22nd Thu	23rd Fri	24th Sat	25th Sun	26th Mon	Events

== Medal table ==
Key

* Host nation (Thailand)

2025 ASEAN Para Games medal table
Rank	Nation	Gold	Silver	Bronze	Total
1	Thailand*	175	155	156	486
2	Indonesia	135	143	114	392
3	Malaysia	64	64	73	201
4	Philippines	45	37	52	134
5	Vietnam	38	48	58	144
6	Myanmar	20	19	20	59
7	Singapore	13	7	9	29
8	Timor-Leste	3	1	1	5
9	Laos	2	5	9	16
10	Brunei	1	3	2	6
Totals (10 entries)		496	482	494	1,472

== Marketing ==
=== Design competition ===
The Sport Authority of Thailand (SAT) organised a design competition for the emblem, motto, and mascot for the 2025 SEA Games and the 2025 ASEAN Para Games. The submitted designs were required to be visually appealing, modern, unique, and reflect Thai identity. The submission period was from 20 September to 25 October 2023. The official awarding ceremony took place at the Chaloem Phrakiat Building at the Hua Mak Sports Complex in Bangkok on 23 November 2023.

=== Emblem ===
The official emblem for the 2025 ASEAN Para Games, designed by Teeranop Wangsillapakun (TNOP DESIGN).

=== Motto ===
The official motto for the 2025 ASEAN Para Games, Create Pride Together (Thai: สร้างความภูมิใจไปด้วยกัน, RTGS: Sang Khwam Phumchai Pi Duaikan, pronounced [sâːŋ kʰwāːm pʰūːm.tɕāj pāj dûaj.kān]), designed by Thawan Ditsathutham.

=== Mascot ===
The official mascots for the 2025 ASEAN Para Games, designed by Teeranop Wangsillapakun, the creative director and founder of TNOP Design, were commissioned by the Design Subcommittee of the Thailand Creative Culture Agency (THACCA) under the National Soft Power Strategy Committee.

The mascots consisted of a group of two characters called The San, each vibrant and full of energy. They came in purple and orange, representing the diversity of Thai society. Each character was designed using geometric patterns inspired by the structural lines of traditional Thai motifs, blending modernity with Thai identity. Together, they symbolised celebration, creativity, cultural connection, and the promotion of diversity in sports and society.

On 7 October 2025, a new version of The San was revealed; the number of mascots was reduced to one, with Sao being retained. It was also recoloured to the Thai flag, to represent national pride. The original two San designs would be retained for merchandise.

== See also ==
- 2025 SEA Games in Bangkok and Chonburi.
- 2007 SEA Games and 2008 ASEAN Para Games in Nakhon Ratchasima.

== Notes ==
Preceded by Phnom Penh	13th ASEAN Para Games; Nakhon Ratchasima; 2025	Succeeded by Malaysia
