= Thailand Creative Culture Agency =

- สำนักงานส่งเสริมวัฒนธรรมสร้างสรรค์

Agency overview
- Formed: 2024
- Preceding agency: National Soft Power Strategy Committee
- Dissolved: 2026
- Headquarters: 1160 Charoen Krung Road, Bang Rak, Bangkok 10500 (initial)
- Parent agency: Strategic Transformation Office
- Website: thacca.go.th

Thailand Creative Culture Agency (Thai: สำนักงานส่งเสริมวัฒนธรรมสร้างสรรค์) it is an agency of the Thai government under the direct supervision of the prime minister. Its objective is to drive Thailand's soft power industry. It is currently a subsidiary agency of the Strategic Transformation Office (STO), an administrative agency of the National Soft Power Strategy Committee, but has not yet been officially established.

In the future, after the Thailand Creative Culture Agency Bill B.E. .... comes into effect, THACCA will be established as an official government agency through transformation from a Creative Economy Agency, along with transferring the soft power promotion mission from STO to operate on its own in full form and supervised by the National Creative Culture Promotion Policy Committee, which will transform from the National Soft Power Strategy Committee.

== History ==
The Thailand Creative Culture Agency was informally established in early 2024 during the government of Srettha Thavisin under the supervision of the Strategic Transformation Office, an administrative agency of the National Soft Power Strategy Committee. The official website and social media under the name THACCA have been open since February.

The official agency will be established in the future under the provisions of the Thailand Creative Culture Agency Bill, which was drafted during the Srettha Thavisin government and the public hearing was completed between 1–30 April 2024. However, the draft bill was delayed due to a change in government, with the newly appointed National Soft Power Strategy Committee (2nd Committee) in the Paethongtarn Shinawatra government bringing it back for consideration on December 24, 2024. Currently awaiting submission for consideration by the Cabinet and the Office of the Council of State. Before being forwarded to the 26th Thai House of Representatives and the 13th Thai Senate, it is expected to come into effect in late 2025.

The transitional provisions of this bill provide that after this bill comes into force,

- The National Soft Power Strategy Committee will temporarily act as the National Creative Culture Policy Committee until a qualified committee member is appointed within 180 days, after which the committee will be deemed to be dissolved and completely transformed.
- Creative Economy Agency will be dissolved and transformed into Thailand Creative Culture Agency immediately, including transferring the soft power driving mission from Strategic Transformation Office to operate on its own in full form, but
  - The Creative Economy Agency Board shall temporarily act as the Board of Director of Thailand Creative Culture Agency until a new Board of Director is appointed within 180 days.
  - Director of Creative Economy Agency temporarily act as the Director of Thailand Creative Culture Agency.

On 25 March 2026, Yodchanan Wongsawat and Julapun Amornvivat, together with members of parliament from the Pheu Thai Party, jointly submitted a total of ten party-sponsored bills to Lertsak Phattanachaikul in his capacity as the Second Deputy Speaker of the House of Representatives. Among these was the Thailand Creative Culture Agency Bill, proposed by Jiraporn Sindhuprai, a former Minister Attached to the Prime Minister’s Office.

== Mission ==
Thailand Creative Culture Agency will be a strategic agency that fully integrates missions and budgets to support the soft power industry, and has joint plans with both government and private agencies to promote and support Thailand's soft power industry at the international level.

The Thailand Creative Culture Agency will support the soft power industry as follows:

1. Create strategic plans and work plans that are in the same direction, continuous, clear, and without duplication.
2. Financial support by establishing a fund for soft power development to promote entrepreneurs, including setting tax benefits to support all industries.
3. Support knowledge by collecting in-depth marketing information both in Thailand and abroad, including dissemination and support of research and development funds related to soft power.
4. Create new entrepreneurs and promote competitive potential by protecting copyrights, intellectual property, certifying professional standards, providing business advice to entrepreneurs, and setting measures to promote free and fair trade.
5. It is a one-stop service center for private companies to contact, coordinate, or request permission from the government to work in the full range of soft power industries.

== Committee ==
Thailand Creative Culture Agency Bill has established four main committees:

1. The National Creative Culture Policy Committee is responsible for formulating and monitoring strategies and action plans for promoting creative culture and appointing special committees or subcommittees, transforming from the National Soft Power Strategy Committee.
2. Each special committee has the duty to carry out special missions as assigned by the Policy Committee.
3. The Board of Directors of Thailand Creative Culture Agency is responsible for the general affairs of the agency, having been transformed from the Creative Economy Agency Board.
4. The Executive Board of the Creative Culture Promotion Fund is responsible for managing the fund.
