= Laos at the 2026 Asian Para Games =

- Flag of Laos
- IPC code: LAO
- NPC: Lao Paralympic Committee
- Website: www.laosparalympic.com/home

in Aichi-Nagoya, Japan 18 October 2026 – 24 October 2026
- Competitors: 12 (3 men and 9 women) in 4 sports
- Medals: Gold 0 Silver 0 Bronze 0 Total 0

Asian Para Games appearances
- 2010; 2014; 2018; 2022; 2026

Lao PDR or Laos participated in the 2026 Asian Para Games, in Nagoya, Aichi Prefecture, Japan, from 18 to 24 October 2026.

Laos sent a contingent of 12 athletes, 3 men and 9 women along with support staff. They participated in four sports, namely, Para Athletics, Para Cycling, Para Swimming and Wheelchair basketball.

This was Laos' fifth appearance in the Asian Games. Laos' athletes failed to win any medals at this edition of the Games, with the best result achieved by Bounphet Thepthida in men's 100m finals (T13 category) ending at fifth position (while also recording his personal best).

Laos youngest athlete in the Games, Seng On Thonglone was just 18 years old at the time of his participation in this edition of the Games.

== Medalists ==
Medal	Athlete	Sport	Event	Date

=== Summary ===
Medals by events
Sport	Gold	Silver	Bronze	Total
Total	0	0	0	0

Medals by day
Day	Date	Gold	Silver	Bronze	Total
1	19 October	0	0	0	0
2	20 October	0	0	0	0
3	21 October	0	0	0	0
4	22 October	0	0	0	0
5	23 October	0	0	0	0
6	24 October	0	0	0	0
Total		0	0	0	0

Medals by gender
Gender	Gold	Silver	Bronze	Total
Female	0	0	0	0
Male	0	0	0	0
Mixed	0	0	0	0
Total	0	0	0	0

== Competitors ==
Following is the list of sports and number of athletes that represented Laos. They competed across various categories in Para Athletics, Para Cycling, Para Swimming, and Para Wheelchair basketball. Later sections lay out sports-wise detailed results.

Sport	Men	Women	Total
Athletics	1	-	1
Cycling	1	-	1
Swimming	1	-	1
Wheelchair basketball	-	9	9
Total	3	9	12

== Athletics ==
Silver medalist from athletics events at 2025 ASEAN Para Games held in Thailand, Bounphet Thepthida was the sole athlete to represent Laos in track and field events. He recorded his personal best in men's 100m finals (T13 category) and men's long jump (T13 category).

Track events

Athlete	Event	Class	Heat		Final	
Athlete	Event	Class	Result	Rank	Result	Rank
Bounphet Thepthida	Men's 100 m	T13	11.39	3Q	11.22 PB	5
Bounphet Thepthida	Men's 400 m	T13	DNS		-	

Field events

Athlete	Event	Class	Qualification		Final	
Athlete	Event	Class	Result	Rank	Result	Rank
Bounphet Thepthida	Men's Long jump	T13	—N/a		5.30 PB	8

== Cycling ==
Vilaphone 'Bee' Phouthavongsay, aged 43 years, represented Laos in Cycling events.

Men

Athlete	Event	Qualifying round		Final	
Athlete	Event	Timing	Rank	Timing	Rank
Vilaphone Phouthavongsay	Men's C1-5 Time Trial	—N/a		35:49.11	19
Vilaphone Phouthavongsay	Men's C4-5 Road Race	—N/a		−2LAP	13

== Swimming ==
Seng On Thonglone, the lone swimmer from Laos, at the age of just 18, finished seventh in 100m freestyle S9 event. He could not advance to finals in the 100m breaststroke SB8 event.

Athlete	Event	Heat		Final	
Athlete	Event	Result	Rank	Result	Rank
Seng On Thonglone	100 m freestyle S9	1:14.26	12	Did not advance	
Seng On Thonglone	100 m breaststroke SB8	-		1:27.21	7

== Wheelchair Basketball ==
Silver medalists at 2025 ASEAN Para Games held in Thailand, Laos women's wheelchair basketball team were up against national teams of Thailand, China, Cambodia, Iran, and Japan. The team was captained in this edition of the Games by Phatsala Insalong. They ended their campaign at sixth position after failing to qualify for the knockout games.

Team	Event	Group stage					Quarter-finals	Semi-finals	Final / Classification play-offs	
Team	Event	Opposition Score	Opposition Score	Opposition Score	Opposition Score	Opposition Score	Opposition Score	Opposition Score	Opposition Score	Rank
Laos' Women	Women's Tournament	Thailand L 14–91	Cambodia L 28–55	China L 20–109	Iran; L 27–68	Japan; L 12–88	-		Cambodia L 26–54	6
