= Wheelchair basketball at the 2026 Asian Para Games =

- Venue: Aichi International Arena
- Location: Nagoya, Aichi Prefecture, Japan
- Dates: 16–23 October 2026
- Nations: 10

Wheelchair basketball was be one of the events at the 2026 Asian Para Games, which was held at the Aichi International Arena from 16 to 23 October 2026.

== Schedule ==
The schedule was as followed:

P	Preliminary round	C	Classification	¼	Quarterfinals	½	Semifinals	B	Bronze medal match	F	Gold medal match

Event↓/Date →	16th Fri	17th Sat	18th Sun	19th Mon	20th Tue	21st Wed		22nd Thu			23rd Fri		
Men's tournament	P	P	—N/a	P	¼	C	½	C			C	B	F
Women's tournament	P	P	—N/a	P	P	P		C	B	F	—N/a		

== Qualification ==
The qualified teams earned their berth via the men's and women's tournaments of the 2025 IWBF Asia Oceania Championships in Bangkok, Thailand which was held in November 2025.

Men's

- China
- Iran
- Iraq
- Japan (hosts)
- Kuwait
- Philippines
- South Korea
- Thailand

Women's

- Cambodia
- China
- Iran
- Japan (hosts)
- Laos
- Thailand

== Results ==
=== Men's tournament ===
==== Preliminary round ====
===== Group A =====
Pos	Team	Pld	W	L	PF	PA	PD	Pts	Qualification
1	Japan (H)	3	3	0	214	116	+98	6	Advance to Quarterfinals
2	Thailand	3	2	1	187	159	+28	5	Advance to Quarterfinals
3	China	3	1	2	162	206	−44	4	Advance to Quarterfinals
4	Kuwait	3	0	3	137	219	−82	3	Advance to Quarterfinals

Source: Asian Para Games 2026
Rules for classification: 1) Points; 2) Head-to-head results; 3) Points difference; 4) Points scored.
(H) Hosts

16 October
10:30 UTC+9

Report

Kuwait	44–72	Thailand
Scoring by quarter: 10–19, 18–18, 8–21, 8–14

Aichi International Arena Sub Arena, Nagoya

16 October
13:00 UTC+9

Report

China	38–76	Japan
Scoring by quarter: 13–15, 10–20, 6–18, 9–23

Aichi International Arena Main Arena, Nagoya

17 October
16:30 UTC+9

Report

Kuwait	60–77	China
Scoring by quarter: 11–20, 20–18, 17–18, 12–21

Aichi International Arena Main Arena, Nagoya

17 October
20:00 UTC+9

Report

Japan	68–45	Thailand
Scoring by quarter: 17–7, 16–16, 17–18, 18–4

Aichi International Arena Main Arena, Nagoya

19 October
14:30 UTC+9

Report

Thailand	70–47	China
Scoring by quarter: 22–8, 15–17, 20–13, 13–9

Aichi International Arena Sub Arena, Nagoya

19 October
20:30 UTC+9

Report

Japan	70–33	Kuwait
Scoring by quarter: 24–5, 26–2, 8–12, 12–14

Aichi International Arena Main Arena, Nagoya

===== Group B =====
Pos	Team	Pld	W	L	PF	PA	PD	Pts	Qualification
1	Iran	3	3	0	219	130	+89	6	Advance to Quarterfinals
2	South Korea	3	2	1	220	162	+58	5	Advance to Quarterfinals
3	Iraq	3	1	2	159	190	−31	4	Advance to Quarterfinals
4	Philippines	3	0	3	111	227	−116	3	Advance to Quarterfinals

Source: Asian Para Games 2026
Rules for classification: 1) Points; 2) Head-to-head results; 3) Points difference; 4) Points scored.

16 October
14:00 UTC+9

Report

Iraq	23–81	Iran
Scoring by quarter: 8–24, 7–20, 4–14, 4–23

Aichi International Arena Sub Arena, Nagoya

16 October
17:30 UTC+9

Report

South Korea	84–31	Philippines
Scoring by quarter: 22–7, 28–3, 18–14, 16–7

Aichi International Arena Sub Arena, Nagoya

17 October
9:30 UTC+9

Report

Iran	67–62	South Korea
Scoring by quarter: 16–21, 12–10, 20–13, 19–18

Aichi International Arena Main Arena, Nagoya

17 October
13:30 UTC+9

Report

Philippines	35–72	Iraq
Scoring by quarter: 4–19, 12–16, 8–18, 11–19

Aichi International Arena Sub Arena, Nagoya

19 October
13:30 UTC+9

Report

Philippines	45–71	Iran
Scoring by quarter: 2–25, 8–14, 22–11, 13–21

Aichi International Arena Main Arena, Nagoya

19 October
17:00 UTC+9

Report

Iraq	64–74	South Korea
Scoring by quarter: 6–24, 23–17, 19–20, 16–13

Aichi International Arena Main Arena, Nagoya

==== Final round ====
===== Bracket =====
Placement (Fifth place)
23 October
B3	Iraq	62
A3	China	65
Placement (Seventh place)
22 October
A4	Kuwait	61
B4	Philippines	53

Consolation (5th–8th)
21 October
B3	Iraq	63
A4	Kuwait	50
21 October
A3	China	61
B4	Philippines	59

Quarterfinals
20 October
A2	Thailand	71
B3	Iraq	42
20 October
B1	Iran	110
A4	Kuwait	43
20 October
B2	South Korea	67
A3	China	37
20 October
A1	Japan	88
B4	Philippines	16

Semifinals
21 October
A2	Thailand	50
B1	Iran	83
21 October
B2	South Korea	39
A1	Japan	64

Final
23 October
B1	Iran	47
A1	Japan	55
Bronze medal game
23 October
A2	Thailand	64
B2	South Korea	73

===== Quarterfinals =====
20 October
9:30 UTC+9

Report

Thailand	71–42	Iraq
Scoring by quarter: 14–14, 21–15, 17–5, 19–8

Aichi International Arena Main Arena, Nagoya

20 October
13:00 UTC+9

Report

South Korea	67–37	China
Scoring by quarter: 16–6, 16–14, 20–7, 15–10

Aichi International Arena Main Arena, Nagoya

20 October
16:30 UTC+9

Report

Japan	88–16	Philippines
Scoring by quarter: 25–2, 16–4, 21–8, 26–2

Aichi International Arena Main Arena, Nagoya

20 October
20:00 UTC+9

Report

Iran	110–43	Kuwait
Scoring by quarter: 24–10, 25–6, 26–16, 35–11

Aichi International Arena Main Arena, Nagoya

===== 5th–8th consolation round =====
21 October
10:30 UTC+9

Report

China	61–59	Philippines
Scoring by quarter: 10–12, 18–13, 15–19, 18–15

Aichi International Arena Sub Arena, Nagoya

21 October
17:30 UTC+9

Report

Iraq	63–50	Kuwait
Scoring by quarter: 22–12, 21–15, 10–14, 10–9

Aichi International Arena Sub Arena, Nagoya

====== Seventh place match ======
22 October
9:30 UTC+9

Report

Philippines	53–61	Kuwait
Scoring by quarter: 16–16, 10–12, 12–13, 15–20

Aichi International Arena Sub Arena, Nagoya

====== Fifth place match ======
23 October
10:00 UTC+9

Report

China	65–62	Iraq
Scoring by quarter: 16–12, 18–14, 12–14, 19–22

Aichi International Arena Main Arena, Nagoya

===== Semifinals =====
21 October
16:30 UTC+9

Report

Iran	83–50	Thailand
Scoring by quarter: 22–13, 17–14, 22–19, 22–4

Aichi International Arena Main Arena, Nagoya

21 October
20:00 UTC+9

Report

Japan	64–39	South Korea
Scoring by quarter: 19–8, 18–10, 9–10, 18–11

Aichi International Arena Main Arena, Nagoya

===== Bronze medal match =====
23 October
13:45 UTC+9

Report

South Korea	73–64	Thailand
Scoring by quarter: 15–21, 16–13, 20–16, 22–14

Aichi International Arena Main Arena, Nagoya

===== Final =====
23 October
18:30 UTC+9

Report

Japan	55–47	Iran
Scoring by quarter: 7–12, 13–4, 11–12, 24–19

Aichi International Arena Main Arena, Nagoya

=== Women's tournament ===
==== Preliminary round ====
Pos	Team	Pld	W	L	PF	PA	PD	Pts	Qualification
1	China	5	5	0	362	117	+245	10	Gold medal match
2	Japan (H)	5	4	1	320	136	+184	9	Gold medal match
3	Thailand	5	3	2	271	220	+51	8	Bronze medal match
4	Iran	5	2	3	184	256	−72	7	Bronze medal match
5	Cambodia	5	1	4	180	278	−98	6	Fifth place game
6	Laos	5	0	5	101	411	−310	5	Fifth place game

Source: Asian Para Games 2026
Rules for classification: 1) Points; 2) Head-to-head results; 3) Points difference; 4) Points scored.
(H) Hosts

16 October
09:30 UTC+9

Report

Cambodia	28–70	China
Scoring by quarter: 2–18, 14–10, 6–20, 6–22

Aichi International Arena Main Arena, Nagoya

16 October
16:30 UTC+9

Report

Laos	14–91	Thailand
Scoring by quarter: 0–23, 10–20, 4–27, 0–21

Aichi International Arena Main Arena, Nagoya

16 October
20:00 UTC+9

Report

Iran	20–65	Japan
Scoring by quarter: 4–22, 10-8, 4–15, 2–20

Aichi International Arena Main Arena, Nagoya

17 October
13:00 UTC+9

Report

Japan	31–48	China
Scoring by quarter: 4–19, 7–8, 9–14, 11-7

Aichi International Arena Main Arena, Nagoya

17 October
14:00 UTC+9

Report

Cambodia	55–28	Laos
Scoring by quarter: 20–8, 10–4, 10–4, 15–12

Aichi International Arena Sub Arena, Nagoya

17 October
17:30 UTC+9

Report

Iran	33–64	Thailand
Scoring by quarter: 6–16, 13–16, 7–15, 7–17

Aichi International Arena Sub Arena, Nagoya

19 October
10:00 UTC+9

Report

Thailand	34–63	Japan
Scoring by quarter: 9–23, 15–12, 6–15, 4–13

Aichi International Arena Main Arena, Nagoya

19 October
11:00 UTC+9

Report

China	109–20	Laos
Scoring by quarter: 30–6, 16–10, 32–0, 31–4

Aichi International Arena Sub Arena, Nagoya

19 October
18:00 UTC+9

Report

Cambodia	39–52	Iran
Scoring by quarter: 4–16, 19–8, 7–12, 9–16

Aichi International Arena Sub Arena, Nagoya

20 October
10:30 UTC+9

Report

Laos	27–68	Iran
Scoring by quarter: 8–10, 8–17, 9–21, 2–20

Aichi International Arena Sub Arena, Nagoya

20 October
14:00 UTC+9

Report

China	74–27	Thailand
Scoring by quarter: 20–4, 16–10, 18–7, 20–6

Aichi International Arena Sub Arena, Nagoya

20 October
17:30 UTC+9

Report

Japan	73–22	Cambodia
Scoring by quarter: 26–6, 14–0, 20–3, 13–13

Aichi International Arena Sub Arena, Nagoya

21 October
09:30 UTC+9

Report

Japan	88–12	Laos
Scoring by quarter: 21–4, 29–4, 16–4, 22–0

Aichi International Arena Main Arena, Nagoya

21 October
13:00 UTC+9

Report

China	61–11	Iran
Scoring by quarter: 19–0, 14–4, 10–3, 18–4

Aichi International Arena Main Arena, Nagoya

21 October
14:00 UTC+9

Report

Thailand	55–36	Cambodia
Scoring by quarter: 11–8, 20–15, 15–6, 9–7

Aichi International Arena Sub Arena, Nagoya

==== Final round ====
===== Fifth place match =====
22 October
10:30 UTC+9

Report

Cambodia	54–26	Laos
Scoring by quarter: 8–10, 8–4, 18–6, 20–6

Aichi International Arena Main Arena, Nagoya

===== Bronze medal match =====
22 October
14:15 UTC+9

Report

Thailand	64–33	Iran
Scoring by quarter: 15–8, 20–10, 21–4, 8–11

Aichi International Arena Main Arena, Nagoya

===== Final =====
22 October
19:00 UTC+9

Report

China	75–25	Japan
Scoring by quarter: 16–4, 22–6, 14–6, 22–9

Aichi International Arena Main Arena, Nagoya

== Final standings ==
Men's tournament
Rank	Team	Pld	W	L
1st place, gold medalist(s)	Japan	6	6	0
2nd place, silver medalist(s)	Iran	6	5	1
3rd place, bronze medalist(s)	South Korea	6	4	2
4	Thailand	6	4	2
5	China	6	3	3
6	Iraq	6	2	4
7	Kuwait	5	1	4
8	Philippines	5	0	5

Women's tournament
Rank	Team	Pld	W	L
1st place, gold medalist(s)	China	6	6	0
2nd place, silver medalist(s)	Japan	6	4	2
3rd place, bronze medalist(s)	Thailand	6	4	2
4	Iran	6	2	4
5	Cambodia	6	2	4
6	Laos	6	0	6

== Medalists ==
Event	Gold	Silver	Bronze
Men	Japan (JPN): Renshi Chokai; Yoshinobu Takamatsu; Koki Maruyama; Rin Kawahara; Takuya Furusawa; Ryuga Akaishi; Taiga Kitakaze; Takuma Taniguchi; Shinsaku Iwata; Naohiro Murakami; Takayoshi Iwai; Satoshi Shiota	Iran (IRI): Erfan Bakhshandeh; Amirreza Ahmadi; Omid Hadiazhar; Mohsen Tolouei; Muhammad Nezhad; Morteza Abedi; Abdoljalil Gharanjik; Vahid Gholamazad; Mohammadhassan Sayari; Muhammadtaha Yarmohammadi; Mahdi Abbasi; Reza Niksirat	South Korea (KOR): Lee Youn-joo; Kim Ho-yong; Kwak Jun-seong; Yang Dong-gil; Yun Seok-hun; Cho Seung-hyun; Lee Chi-won; Kim Min-seong; Hwang Hyun-hwan; Kim Sang-yeol; Gim Dong-hyeon; Lee Byoung-jai
Women	China (CHN): Chen Jingwen; Zhang Xuemei; Zuo Peixi; Li Mei; Lin Suiling; Huang Xiaolian; Zhang Meimei; Qiu Qiaoling; Lyu Caiying; Zhao Rui; Chen Yuhan; Zhao Mingxin	Japan (JPN): Izumi Zaima; Amane Yanagimoto; Ruri Kojima; Aoi Nishimura; Mayo Hagino; Chinami Shimizu; Haruka Ueno; Mari Amimoto; Chihiro Kitada; Yui Kitama; Nana Gunji; Meika Fujiwara	Thailand (THA): Pornthip Kachunram; Wikarnda Phewgradang; Nopparat Tanbut; Warisa Thamlaaied; Natnapa Ponin; Waritsara Phoemkhunthod; Pimjai Putthanoi; Saowalak Nanthasombat; Weerada Patitang; Phattharamon Sangkham; Pawarati Jala; Tharnthip Klinkajorn

Source: Asian Para Games 2026

== See also ==
- Basketball at the 2026 Asian Games
