= Wheelchair basketball at the 2025 ASEAN Para Games =

Wheelchair basketball competition

- Venue: 4th floor Hall 1,Terminal 21 Kora, Nakhon Ratchasima, Thailand
- Dates: 19–25 January 2026

Wheelchair basketball at the 2025 ASEAN Para Games was held at the 4th floor Hall 1, Terminal 21 Kora in Nakhon Ratchasima, Thailand from 19 to 25 January 2026.

== Medal summary ==
* Host nation (Thailand)

Rank	Nation	Gold	Silver	Bronze	Total
1	Thailand (THA)*	4	0	0	4
2	Philippines (PHI)	0	3	0	3
3	Laos (LAO)	0	1	0	1
4	Malaysia (MAS)	0	0	2	2
Totals (4 entries)		4	4	2	10

== Medalists ==
=== Men's ===
Event	Gold	Silver	Bronze
3–on–3	Thailand (THA); Aekkasit Jumjarean; Adisak Kaoboo; Thanakon Lertanachai; Teerapong Pasomsap; Kwanchai Pimkorn	Philippines (PHI); Alfie Cabañog; Jannil Canete; Fel Lander Dawal; Anthony Aze Demeza; Kenneth Christopher Tapia	Malaysia (MAS); Razali bin Cantik; Muhammad Azzwar bin Hassan Asaari; Muhammad Roozaimi bin Johari; Muhammad Hafiz bin Ramli; Muhamad Atib bin Zakaria; Karthik Kanapathy
Team	Thailand (THA); Natthakan Chaotarakan; Aekkasit Jumjarean; Adisak Kaoboo; Thanakon Lertanachai; Panphalit Loekhirantrakun; Chanon Maneerut; Teerapong Pasomsap; Kwanchai Pimkorn; Athin Singdong; Pongsakorn Sripirom; Mongkol Tunsaard; Wichai Yebiang	Philippines (PHI); Mark Vincent Aguilar; Alfie Cabanog; Jannil Canete; Kyle Carlo Carandang; Fel Lander Dawal; Anthony Aze Demeza; John Rey Escalante; Miko Esperanza; Freddie Magdayo; Edgardo Ochaves; Jodriel Paolo Piol; Kenneth Christopher Tapia	Malaysia (MAS); Marzuan bin Abdullah; Hafizuddin bin Bahrin; Razali bin Cantik; Muhammad Azzwar bin Hassan Asaari; Muhamad Firdaus bin Ibrahim; Muhammad Roozaimi bin Johari; Mohamad Azwan bin Mohd Yusoff; Muhammad Hafiz bin Ramli; Muhamad Atib bin Zakaria; Karthik Kanapathy; Freday Tan Yei Bing

=== Women's ===
Event	Gold	Silver	Bronze
3–on–3	Thailand (THA); Pawarati Jala; Natnapa Ponin; Pimjai Putthanoi; Nopparat Tanbut; Warisa Thamlaaied	Philippines (PHI); Rhebilyn Aniban; Patricia Camille Castro; Jean Delos Reyes; Lorna Lilagan; Cecelia Wells	Not awarded
Team	Thailand (THA); Pawarati Jala; Pornthip Kachunram; Tharnthip Klinkajorn; Saowalak Nanthasombat; Weerada Patitang; Wikarnda Phewgradang; Waritsara Phoemkhunthod; Natnapa Ponin; Pimjai Putthanoi; Phattharamon Sangkhum; Nopparat Tanbut; Warisa Thamlaaied	Laos (LAO); Phoukhong; Sinouane Chanthachit; Nit Chitthivong; Kaolee Chongxoualee; Nouhiem Kasien; Phitsamai Keopaseuth; Poupe Phommanasa; Toulaxay Taonkad; Leuan Vongsakda	Not awarded

== Squads ==
=== 3–on–3 ===
Men's

Indonesia	Malaysia	Philippines	Thailand
Lalu Idrus; Danu Kuswantoro; Kasep Ayatulloh Ma; Ivo Shadan; I Komang Suparta	Razali bin Cantik; Muhammad Azzwar bin Hassan Asaari; Muhammad Roozaimi bin Johari; Muhammad Hafiz bin Ramli; Muhamad Atib bin Zakaria; Karthik Kanapathy	Alfie Cabañog; Jannil Canete; Fel Lander Dawal; Anthony Aze Demeza; Kenneth Christopher Tapia	Aekkasit Jumjarean; Adisak Kaoboo; Thanakon Lertanachai; Teerapong Pasomsap; Kwanchai Pimkorn

Women's

Laos	Philippines	Thailand
Phoukhong; Nit Chitthivong; Nouhiem Kasien; Phitsamai Keopaseuth; Toulaxay Taonkad	Rhebilyn Aniban; Patricia Camille Castro; Jean Delos Reyes; Lorna Lilagan; Cecelia Wells	Pawarati Jala; Natnapa Ponin; Pimjai Putthanoi; Nopparat Tanbut; Warisa Thamlaaied

=== Team ===
Men's

Indonesia	Malaysia	Philippines	Thailand
Yulianto; Lalu Idrus; Dwi Kiswantoro; Danu Kuswantoro; Kasep Ayatulloh Ma; Daniel Vinsensius Opat; Hafid Mulya Rahman; Muhammad Rizal; Ivo Shadan; I Komang Suparta; Doni Yulianto	Marzuan bin Abdullah; Hafizuddin bin Bahrin; Razali bin Cantik; Muhammad Azzwar bin Hassan Asaari; Muhamad Firdaus bin Ibrahim; Muhammad Roozaimi bin Johari; Mohamad Azwan bin Mohd Yusoff; Muhammad Hafiz bin Ramli; Muhamad Atib bin Zakaria; Karthik Kanapathy; Freday Tan Yei Bing	Mark Vincent Aguilar; Alfie Cabanog; Jannil Canete; Kyle Carlo Carandang; Fel Lander Dawal; Anthony Aze Demeza; John Rey Escalante; Miko Esperanza; Freddie Magdayo; Edgardo Ochaves; Jodriel Paolo Piol; Kenneth Christopher Tapia	Natthakan Chaotarakan; Aekkasit Jumjarean; Adisak Kaoboo; Thanakon Lertanachai; Panphalit Loekhirantrakun; Chanon Maneerut; Teerapong Pasomsap; Kwanchai Pimkorn; Athin Singdong; Pongsakorn Sripirom; Mongkol Tunsaard; Wichai Yebiang

Women's

Laos	Philippines	Thailand
Phoukhong; Sinouane Chanthachit; Nit Chitthivong; Kaolee Chongxoualee; Nouhiem Kasien; Phitsamai Keopaseuth; Poupe Phommanasa; Toulaxay Taonkad; Leuan Vongsakda	Rhebilyn Aniban; Janet Brinas; Patricia Camille Castro; Jean Delos Reyes; Jocelyn Forllero; Mary Joy Hernandez; Lorna Lilagan; Mylene Margaja; Nicole Navarez; Cathreen Gem Tanyag; Cecelia Wells	Pawarati Jala; Pornthip Kachunram; Tharnthip Klinkajorn; Saowalak Nanthasombat; Weerada Patitang; Wikarnda Phewgradang; Waritsara Phoemkhunthod; Natnapa Ponin; Pimjai Putthanoi; Phattharamon Sangkhum; Nopparat Tanbut; Warisa Thamlaaied

== Results ==
=== Men's tournament 3-on-3 ===
==== Group stage ====
Pos	Team	Pld	W	L	PF	PA	PD	Pts	Qualification
1	Thailand (H)	3	3	0	49	26	+23	6	Semifinals
2	Philippines	3	2	1	43	29	+14	5	Semifinals
3	Malaysia	3	1	2	25	31	−6	4	Semifinals
4	Indonesia	3	0	3	15	46	−31	3	Semifinals

Source: Thailand 2025
Rules for classification: 1) Points; 2) Head-to-head results; 3) Points difference; 4) Points scored.
(H) Hosts

19 January 2026
10:00

Report

Malaysia	8–14	Thailand

4th floor Hall 1,Terminal 21 Kora, Nakhon Ratchasima

19 January 2026
10:30

Report

Indonesia	3–20	Philippines

4th floor Hall 1,Terminal 21 Kora, Nakhon Ratchasima

19 January 2026
11:30

Report

Philippines	11–7	Malaysia

4th floor Hall 1,Terminal 21 Kora, Nakhon Ratchasima

19 January 2026
13:30

Report

Indonesia	6–16	Thailand

4th floor Hall 1,Terminal 21 Kora, Nakhon Ratchasima

19 January 2026
14:30

Report

Philippines	12–19	Thailand

4th floor Hall 1,Terminal 21 Kora, Nakhon Ratchasima

19 January 2026
15:00

Report

Indonesia	6–10	Malaysia

4th floor Hall 1,Terminal 21 Kora, Nakhon Ratchasima

==== Semifinals ====
19 January 2026
16:00

Report

Thailand	14–5	Indonesia

4th floor Hall 1,Terminal 21 Kora, Nakhon Ratchasima

19 January 2026
16:00

Report

Philippines	13–11	Malaysia

4th floor Hall 1,Terminal 21 Kora, Nakhon Ratchasima

==== Bronze medal match ====
21 January 2026
9:30

Report

Malaysia	21–9	Indonesia

4th floor Hall 1,Terminal 21 Kora, Nakhon Ratchasima

==== Gold medal match ====
21 January 2026
11:00

Report

Thailand	20–13	Philippines

4th floor Hall 1,Terminal 21 Kora, Nakhon Ratchasima

=== Women's tournament 3-on-3 ===
==== Group stage ====
Pos	Team	Pld	W	L	PF	PA	PD	Pts	Qualification
1	Thailand (H)	4	4	0	58	11	+47	8	Gold medal match
2	Philippines	4	1	3	18	40	−22	5	Gold medal match
3	Laos	4	1	3	18	43	−25	5	

Source: Thailand 2025
Rules for classification: 1) Points; 2) Head-to-head results; 3) Points difference; 4) Points scored.
(H) Hosts

19 January 2026
10:00

Report

Laos	5–16	Thailand

4th floor Hall 1,Terminal 21 Kora, Nakhon Ratchasima

19 January 2026
11:00

Report

Philippines	2–14	Thailand

4th floor Hall 1,Terminal 21 Kora, Nakhon Ratchasima

19 January 2026
12:00

Report

Philippines	5–8	Laos

4th floor Hall 1,Terminal 21 Kora, Nakhon Ratchasima

19 January 2026
13:30

Report

Laos	1–14	Thailand

4th floor Hall 1,Terminal 21 Kora, Nakhon Ratchasima

19 January 2026
14:30

Report

Philippines	3–14	Thailand

4th floor Hall 1,Terminal 21 Kora, Nakhon Ratchasima

19 January 2026
15:30

Report

Philippines	8–4	Laos

4th floor Hall 1,Terminal 21 Kora, Nakhon Ratchasima

==== Gold medal match ====
21 January 2026
10:00

Report

Thailand	12–5	Philippines

4th floor Hall 1,Terminal 21 Kora, Nakhon Ratchasima

=== Men's team ===
==== Group stage ====
Pos	Team	Pld	W	L	PF	PA	PD	Pts	Qualification
1	Thailand (H)	3	3	0	208	108	+100	6	Semifinals
2	Philippines	3	2	1	162	157	+5	5	Semifinals
3	Malaysia	3	1	2	172	160	+12	4	Semifinals
4	Indonesia	3	0	3	86	203	−117	3	Semifinals

Source: Thailand 2025
Rules for classification: 1) Points; 2) Head-to-head results; 3) Points difference; 4) Points scored.
(H) Hosts

21 January 2026
14:30

Report

Indonesia	30–63	Philippines
Scoring by quarter: 8–18, 8–10, 10–18, 4–17

4th floor Hall 1,Terminal 21 Kora, Nakhon Ratchasima

21 January 2026
16:00

Report

Malaysia	40–73	Thailand
Scoring by quarter: 10–13, 10–16, 8–33, 12–11

4th floor Hall 1,Terminal 21 Kora, Nakhon Ratchasima

22 January 2026
10:00

Report

Malaysia	52–61	Philippines
Scoring by quarter: 10–16, 14–19, 14–8, 14–18

4th floor Hall 1,Terminal 21 Kora, Nakhon Ratchasima

22 January 2026
14:00

Report

Thailand	60–30	Indonesia
Scoring by quarter: 12–4, 11–10, 22–4, 15–12

4th floor Hall 1,Terminal 21 Kora, Nakhon Ratchasima

23 January 2026
10:00

Report

Thailand	75–38	Philippines
Scoring by quarter: 17–10, 22–9, 19–8, 17–11

4th floor Hall 1,Terminal 21 Kora, Nakhon Ratchasima

23 January 2026
15:00

Report

Malaysia	80–26	Indonesia
Scoring by quarter: 20–13, 19–6, 22–4, 19–3

4th floor Hall 1,Terminal 21 Kora, Nakhon Ratchasima

==== Semifinals ====
24 January 2026
10:00

Report

Thailand	74–40	Indonesia
Scoring by quarter: 16–8, 20–9, 19–15, 19–8

4th floor Hall 1,Terminal 21 Kora, Nakhon Ratchasima

24 January 2026
10:00

Report

Malaysia	44–70	Philippines
Scoring by quarter: 14–20, 6–16, 14–12, 10–22

4th floor Hall 1,Terminal 21 Kora, Nakhon Ratchasima

==== Bronze medal match ====
24 January 2026
15:30

Report

Indonesia	30–76	Malaysia
Scoring by quarter: 6–15, 7–20, 5–21, 12–20

4th floor Hall 1,Terminal 21 Kora, Nakhon Ratchasima

==== Gold medal match ====
25 January 2026
14:00

Report

Thailand	90–44	Philippines
Scoring by quarter: 24–8, 30–6, 17–11, 19–19

4th floor Hall 1,Terminal 21 Kora, Nakhon Ratchasima

=== Women's team ===
==== Group stage ====
Pos	Team	Pld	W	L	PF	PA	PD	Pts	Qualification
1	Thailand (H)	4	4	0	277	89	+188	8	Gold medal match
2	Laos	4	2	2	146	183	−37	6	Gold medal match
3	Philippines	4	0	4	84	235	−151	4	

Source: Thailand 2025
Rules for classification: 1) Points; 2) Head-to-head results; 3) Points difference; 4) Points scored.
(H) Hosts

21 January 2026
14:00

Report

Laos	25–60	Thailand
Scoring by quarter: 8–14, 1–14, 4–20, 12–12

4th floor Hall 1,Terminal 21 Kora, Nakhon Ratchasima

21 January 2026
16:30

Report

Philippines	21–78	Thailand
Scoring by quarter: 2–25, 4–27, 7–16, 8–10

4th floor Hall 1,Terminal 21 Kora, Nakhon Ratchasima

22 January 2026
10:30

Report

Philippines	20–55	Laos
Scoring by quarter: 7–14, 3–18, 6–15, 4–8

4th floor Hall 1,Terminal 21 Kora, Nakhon Ratchasima

23 January 2026
10:30

Report

Laos	30–73	Thailand
Scoring by quarter: 6–14, 6–15, 10–28, 8–16

4th floor Hall 1,Terminal 21 Kora, Nakhon Ratchasima

23 January 2026
15:30

Report

Philippines	13–66	Thailand
Scoring by quarter: 2–23, 0–16, 4–12, 7–15

4th floor Hall 1,Terminal 21 Kora, Nakhon Ratchasima

24 January 2026
15:00

Report

Philippines	30–36	Laos
Scoring by quarter: 2–10, 12–9, 6–12, 8–5

4th floor Hall 1,Terminal 21 Kora, Nakhon Ratchasima

==== Gold medal match ====
25 January 2026
10:00

Report

Thailand	77–18	Laos
Scoring by quarter: 22–4, 14–10, 14–2, 27–2

4th floor Hall 1,Terminal 21 Kora, Nakhon Ratchasima
