= Strategic Transformation Office =

- สำนักงานขับเคลื่อนการปฏิรูปประเทศ ยุทธศาสตร์ชาติ และการสร้างความสามัคคีปรองดอง

Agency overview
- Formed: 26 November 2018
- Jurisdiction: Kingdom of Thailand
- Headquarters: Bangkok, Thailand
- Agency executive: Nattapon Nattasomboon, Director
- Parent agency: Office of the Prime Minister
- Website: Official website

The Strategic Transformation Office Thailand (STO) (Thai: สำนักงานขับเคลื่อนการปฏิรูปประเทศ ยุทธศาสตร์ชาติ และการสร้างความสามัคคีปรองดอง; or Thai: สำนักงาน ป.ย.ป.) is a Thai department-level government agency operating directly reporting to the Prime Minister.

The office was created in 2018 by order of the National Council for Peace and Order, Thailand's ruling military junta at the time. It is tasked with supervising and implanting Thailand's national strategy. Section 65 of the 2017 Constitution of Thailand mandates the development of a national strategy to ensure development and long term stability.

== Operations ==
Government ministers consult STO on the adoption of new legislation before making a formal proposal to the Cabinet. In 2023, Deputy Prime Minister Somsak Thepsutin proposed the legalization of online gambling to increase government revenue.

In April 2024, The STO's Clean Air Act working group is tasked with combining the 7 drafts of the Clean Air Act into a cohesive bill. In January 2025, the working group announced the Act was projected to pass in April 2025.

In May 2024, the STO proposed amendments to legislation, including bankruptcy law, to liberalize eligibility requirements for government positions.

In 2024, the government under Prime Minister Srettha Thavisin assigned the Strategic Transformation Office to act as the secretariat of the National Soft Power Strategy Committee, tasked with driving Thailand's Soft power strategy. The Strategic Transformation Office has established a subsidiary agency, the Thailand Creative Culture Agency (THACCA), to be responsible for this matter.
