= 2024 IWBF Asia Oceania Championships =

Wheelchair basketball tournament in Bangkok

2024 IWBF Asia-Oceania Championships

Tournament information
- Sport: Wheelchair basketball
- Date: January 9–21, 2024
- Host(s): Bangkok, Thailand
- Venue: 1
- Teams: M: 11; W: 9

Final positions
- Champions: M: Australia; W: China
- 1st runners-up: M: Iran; W: Japan
- 2nd runners-up: M: South Korea; W: Australia

The 2024 IWBF Asia-Oceania Championships were held at the Thai-Japanese Bangkok Youth Center in Bangkok, Thailand between 12 and 20 January 2024. In the men's competition, Australia qualified for a place at the 2024 Summer Paralympics in Paris, France, and Iran earned a place at the 2024 IWBF Men’s Repechage in Antibes, France. In the women's competition, China earned a place at the 2024 Summer Paralympics, while Japan, Australia and Thailand qualified for 2024 IWBF Women's Repechage in Osaka, Japan.

== Background ==
Wheelchair basketball at the 2024 Summer Paralympics in Paris, France, to be hosted between 29 August to 8 September 2024, will feature men's and women's tournaments. There will be reduced number of teams participating: eight teams in each tournament, four less men's teams and two less women's teams than in the previous Games. The 2022 Wheelchair Basketball World Championships were held in Dubai in United Arab Emirates, from 8 to 20 June 2023.

As a result, the winning team from both the men's and women's competitions earned a ticket to the Paris 2024 Paralympics Games. Second and third place getters in the women’s competition earned a place in the 2024 IWBF Women's Repechage in Osaka, Japan, and second place in the men’s competition earned earn a place at the 2024 IWBF Men’s Repechage in Antibes, France.

== Medallists ==
Event	Gold	Silver	Bronze
Men's competition	Australia	Iran	South Korea
Women's competition	China	Japan	Australia

== Men's competition ==
There were two pools, A and B. Both engaged in a round-robin competition to determine rankings, with the top two teams in Pool B advancing to the quarter finals as the 7th and 8th seeds in Pool A.

=== Pool A ===
Team	Pld	W	L	PF	PA	PD	Pts
Australia	5	5	0	362	276	+86	10
Iran	5	4	1	371	286	+85	9
Japan	5	3	2	310	237	+73	8
South Korea	5	2	3	265	286	-21	7
China	5	1	4	276	366	-90	6
Thailand	5	0	5	233	366	-133	5

12 January 2024
19:30

Statistics

Thailand	49–63	China
Scoring by quarter: 8-18, 25-30, 38-44, 49-63
Pts: T. Huajun, 21; Rebs: Y. Lei, 10; Asts: Y. Lei, 11		Pts: A. Jumjarean, 21; Rebs: A. Jumjarean, 14; Asts: A. Jumjarean, 5

Bangkok Youth Center Court 1

13 January 2024
13:30

Statistics

South Korea	48–67	Iran
Scoring by quarter: 13-19, 24-34, 37-48, 48-67
Pts: S. Cho, 16; Rebs: S. Yun, 11; Asts: S. Cho, 5		Pts: M. Abedi, 17; Rebs: M. Sayari, 12; Asts: M. Tolouie Tamardash, 6

Bangkok Youth Center Court 1

13 January 2024
17:30

Statistics

Japan	48–49	Australia
Scoring by quarter: 10-17, 24-31, 38-42, 48-49
Pts: H. Kozai, 17; Rebs: R. Chokai, 10; Asts: R. Chokai, 7		Pts: T. Knowles, 15; Rebs: B. Latham, 17; Asts: T. Knowles, 7

Bangkok Youth Center Court 1

14 January 2024
12:30

Statistics

Iran	86–51	Thailand
Scoring by quarter: 17-9, 44-21, 60-34, 86-51
Pts: M. Abedi, 20; Rebs: M. Abedi, 7 Asts: O. Hadiazhar, 8		Pts: K. Pimkorn, 17; Rebs: A. Jumjarean, 8 Asts: K. Pimkorn, 4

Bangkok Youth Center Court 1

14 January 2024
13:00

Statistics

China	42–67	Japan
Scoring by quarter: 2-19, 12-30, 25-42, 42-67
Pts: Q. Xulei, 14; Rebs: T. Huajun, 6 Asts: Y. Lei, 3		Pts: K. Maruyama, 12; Rebs: K. Akita, 8 Asts: R. Chokai, 8

Bangkok Youth Center Court 2

14 January 2024
14:30

Statistics

Australia	63–50	South Korea
Scoring by quarter: 22-6, 34-27, 47-37, 63-50
Pts: T. Knowles, 21; Rebs: B. Latham, 21; Asts: T. Knowles, 8		Pts: D. Gim, 14; Rebs: D. Gim, 8 Asts: S. Cho, 7

Bangkok Youth Center Court 1

15 January 2024
10:30

Statistics

Australia	95–68	China
Scoring by quarter: 22-18, 45-33, 67-51, 95-68
Pts: B. Latham, 32; Rebs: B. Latham, 10; Asts: S. Norris, 12		Pts: Q. Xulei, 34; Rebs: W. Zhengquan, 7 Asts: Y. Lei, 10

Bangkok Youth Center Court 1

15 January 2024
14:30

Statistics

Japan	65–74	Iran
Scoring by quarter: 11-15, 33-34, 47-59, 65-74
Pts: R. Chokai, 19; Rebs: R. Chokai, 12; Asts: R. Chokai, 11		Pts: O. Hadiazhar, 25; Rebs: M. Sayari, 15; Asts: O. Hadiazhar, 5

Bangkok Youth Center Court 1

15 January 2024
18:30

Statistics

Thailand	50–57	South Korea
Scoring by quarter: 13-13, 23-23, 39-41, 50-57
Pts: N. Chaotarakan, 14; Rebs: N. Chaotarakan, 6 Asts: A. Jumjarean, 5		Pts: Y. Lee, 16; Rebs: D. Gim, 6 Asts: S. Cho, 10

Bangkok Youth Center Court 1

16 January 2024
13:00

Statistics

Iran	60–69	Australia
Scoring by quarter: 16-17, 32-35, 48-50, 60-69
Pts: M. Sayari, 25; Rebs: M. Sayari, 10; Asts: M. Sayari, 7		Pts: E. Leard, 20; Rebs: B. Latham, 11; Asts: T. Knowles, 15

Bangkok Youth Center Court 2

16 January 2024
14:30

Statistics

South Korea	71–50	China
Scoring by quarter: 19-14, 31-24, 48-39, 71-50
Pts: Q. Xulei, 24; Rebs: T. Huajun, 10; Asts: Y. Lei, 9		Pts: D. Gim, 16; Rebs: D. Yang, 5 Asts: S. Kim, 6

Bangkok Youth Center Court 1

16 January 2024
18:30

Statistics

Japan	74–33	Thailand
Scoring by quarter: 21-12, 38-18, 54-26, 74-33
Pts: N. Murakami, 19; Rebs: K. Akita, 7 Asts: T. Furusawa, 6		Pts: A. Jumjarean, 11; Rebs: S. Rueangwongngam, 6 Asts: A. Jumjarean, 5

Bangkok Youth Center Court 1

17 January 2024
12:30

Statistics

China	53–84	Iran
Scoring by quarter: 6-22, 26-43, 44-63, 53-84
Pts: D. Hai, 22; Rebs: D. Hai, 8 Asts: Y. Lei, 10		Pts: M. Sayari, 19; Rebs: M. Sayari, 9 Asts: O. Hadiazhar, 6

Bangkok Youth Center Court 1

17 January 2024
15:00

Statistics

Thailand	50–86	Australia
Scoring by quarter: 2-17, 19-37, 33-60, 50-86
Pts: K. Pimkorn, 26; Rebs: A. Jumjarean, 8		Pts: T. McHugh, 31; Rebs: T. McHugh, 11; Asts: S. Norris, 10

Bangkok Youth Center Court 2

17 January 2024
16:30

Statistics

Japan	56–39	South Korea
Scoring by quarter: 12-6, 33-15, 44-31, 56-39
Pts: H. Kozai, 17; Rebs: R. Chokai, 14; Asts: R. Chokai, 8		Pts: J. Kwak, 16; Rebs: S. Kim, 10; Asts: S. Kim, 4

Bangkok Youth Center Court 1

=== Pool B ===
Team	Pld	W	L	PF	PA	PD	Pts
Afghanistan	4	4	0	291	180	+111	8
Saudi Arabia	4	3	1	244	222	+22	7
United Arab Emirates	4	2	2	214	228	-14	6
Philippines	4	1	3	215	242	-27	5
New Zealand	4	0	4	166	258	-92	4

12 January 2024
14:30

Statistics

Philippines	54–55	United Arab Emirates
Scoring by quarter: 11-11, 25-29, 42-41, 54-55
Pts: J. Escalante, 23; Rebs: A. Cabanog, 10; Asts: M. Aguilar, 3		Pts: J. Murad, 20; Rebs: M. Alzarooni, 11; Asts: M. Alzarooni, 9

Bangkok Youth Center Court 1

12 January 2024
16:30

Statistics

Afghanistan	77–37	New Zealand
Scoring by quarter: 25-5, 42-9, 55-20, 77-37
Pts: A. Rahimzai, 24; Rebs: A. Rahimzai, 12; Asts: M. Sultani, 8		Rebs: N. Fa’atau, 12; Asts: N. Fa’atau, 4

Bangkok Youth Center Court 1

14 January 2024
10:30

Statistics

New Zealand	44–51	United Arab Emirates
Scoring by quarter: 12-12, 28-27, 34-41, 44-51
Pts: K. Murray, 14; Rebs: N. Fa’atau, 16; Asts: E. Wood, 5		Pts: J. Murad, 29; Rebs: T. Al-yassi, 9 Asts: M. Alzarooni, 7

Bangkok Youth Center Court 1

14 January 2024
11:00

Statistics

Saudi Arabia	44–79	Afghanistan
Scoring by quarter: 13-12, 21-36, 40-56, 44-79
Pts: E. Buayti, 12; Rebs: A. Alfifi, 11; Asts: E. Buayti, 5		Pts: A. Rahimzai, 31; Rebs: A. Rahimzai, 13; Asts: A. Afzali, 9

Bangkok Youth Center Court 2

15 January 2024
15:00

Statistics

Afghanistan	78–48	Philippines
Scoring by quarter: 13-16, 39-28, 60-38, 78-48
Pts: A. Rahimzai, 28; Rebs: A. Rahimzai, 10; Asts: M. Sultani, 5		Pts: K. Tapia, 19; Rebs: A. Cabanog, 9 Asts: K. Tapia, 4

Bangkok Youth Center Court 2

15 January 2024
17:00

Statistics

New Zealand	37–66	Saudi Arabia
Scoring by quarter: 3-15, 12-31, 26-46, 37-66
Pts: K. Murray, 17; Rebs: K. Murray, 7 Asts: E. Wood, 5		Pts: E. Buayti, 15; Rebs: A. Bin Shaylan, 7 Asts: F. Bin Diran, 6

Bangkok Youth Center Court 2

16 January 2024
12:30

Statistics

Philippines	49–61	Saudi Arabia
Scoring by quarter: 8-22, 22-38, 36-48, 49-61
Pts: A. Cabanog, 18; Rebs: J. Legacion, 14; Asts: K. Tapia, 12		Pts: A. Bin Shaylan, 22; Rebs: A. Bin Shaylan, 16; Asts: F. Bin Diran, 7

Bangkok Youth Center Court 1

16 January 2024
15:00

Statistics

United Arab Emirates	51–57	Afghanistan
Scoring by quarter: 10-17, 22-31, 32-47, 51-57
Pts: M. Alzarooni, 18; Rebs: T. Al-yassi, 9 Asts: M. Alzarooni, 5		Pts: A. Rahimzai, 24; Rebs: A. Rahimzai, 10; Asts: A. Rahimzai, 4

Bangkok Youth Center Court 2

17 January 2024
11:00

Statistics

New Zealand	48–64	Philippines
Scoring by quarter: 8-13, 19-34, 30-52, 48-64
Pts: K. Murray, 13; Rebs: K. Murray, 10; Asts: E. Wood, 5		Pts: K. Tapia, 24; Rebs: A. Cabanog, 14; Asts: K. Tapia, 11

Bangkok Youth Center Court 2

17 January 2024
18:30

Statistics

Saudi Arabia	73–57	United Arab Emirates
Scoring by quarter: 19-10, 35-25, 57-42, 73-57
Pts: E. Buayti, 21; Rebs: A. Bin Shaylan, 12; Asts: E. Buayti, 10		Pts: I. Alhammadi, 18; Rebs: J. Murad, 11; Asts: J. Albedwawi, 5

Bangkok Youth Center Court 1

=== Placement matches ===
==== 10th-11th ====
18 January 2024
19:00

Statistics

Philippines	48–45	New Zealand
Scoring by quarter: 14-10, 22-19, 36-31, 48-45
Pts: A. Cabanog, 20; Rebs: A. Cabanog, 16; Asts: K. Tapia, 10		Pts: E. Wood, 18; Rebs: E. Wood, 10; Asts: N. Fa’atau, 5

Bangkok Youth Center Court 2

==== 9th-11th ====
19 January 2024
15:00

Statistics

United Arab Emirates	53–43	New Zealand
Scoring by quarter: 12-16, 30-22, 46-31, 53-43
Pts: J. Murad, 16; Rebs: M. Alhebsi, 9 Asts: M. Alzarooni, 7		Pts: E. Wood, 14; Rebs: N. Fa’atau, 7 Asts: L. Mcdowall, 4

Bangkok Youth Center Court 2

==== 9th-10th ====
20 January 2024
09:00

Statistics

United Arab Emirates	42–70	Philippines
Scoring by quarter: 6-22, 16-46, 34-58, 42-70
Pts: M. Alzarooni, 12; Rebs: J. Albedwawi, 7 Asts: M. Alzarooni, 8		Pts: A. Cabanog, 26; Rebs: A. Cabanog, 15; Asts: K. Tapia, 15

Bangkok Youth Center Court 2

==== 5th-8th crossover ====
Placement matches
17:00 19 January 2024
China	65
Saudi Arabia	48
18:30 19 January 2024
Thailand	72
Afghanistan	38

5th Place
13:00 20 January 2024
China	86
Thailand	74
7th Place
11:00 20 January 2024
Afghanistan	48
Saudi Arabia	57

19 January 2024
17:00

Statistics

China	65–48	Saudi Arabia
Scoring by quarter: 19-10, 35-20, 60-32, 65-48
Pts: Y. Lei, 18; Rebs: T. Huajun, 10; Asts: Y. Lei, 10		Pts: A. Albishi, 14; Rebs: E. Buayti, 10; Asts: A. Bin Shaylan, 3

Bangkok Youth Center Court 2

19 January 2024
18:30

Statistics

Thailand	72–38	Afghanistan
Scoring by quarter: 15-11, 33-20, 58-28, 72-38
Pts: K. Pimkorn, 24; Rebs: A. Singdong, 8 Asts: K. Pimkorn, 5		Pts: A. Rahimzai, 12; Rebs: A. Rahimzai, 8 Asts: A. Afzali, 3

Bangkok Youth Center Court 2

==== 7th-8th place ====
20 January 2024
11:00

Statistics

Afghanistan	48–57	Saudi Arabia
Scoring by quarter: 14-10, 23-22, 34-41, 48-57
Pts: E. Buayti, 20; Rebs: F. Bin Diran, 8 Asts: A. Bin Shaylan, 7		Pts: A. Afzali, 13; Rebs: S. Sadat, 9 Asts: A. Rahimzai, 6

Bangkok Youth Center Court 2

==== 5th-6th place ====
20 January 2024
13:00

Statistics

China	86–74	Thailand
Scoring by quarter: 19-23, 41-39, 60-55, 86-74
Pts: W. Zhengquan, 28; Rebs: T. Huajun, 8 Asts: Q. Xulei, 14		Pts: A. Singdong, 24; Rebs: K. Pimkorn, 5 Asts: K. Pimkorn, 9

Bangkok Youth Center Court 2

=== Finals ===
Quarter-finals
19:00 18 January 2024
Australia	92
Saudi Arabia	20
13:00 18 January 2024
South Korea	51
China	50
17:00 18 January 2024
Iran	81
Afghanistan	41
15:00 18 January 2024
Japan	92
Thailand	27

Semi-finals
16:30 19 January 2024
Australia	56
South Korea	51
14:30 19 January 2024
Iran	63
Japan	48

Final
16:30 20 January 2024
Australia	53
Iran	51
Bronze medal
12:30 20 January 2024
Japan	43
South Korea	53

==== Quarter finals ====
18 January 2024
13:00

Statistics

South Korea	51–50	China
Scoring by quarter: 16-10, 28-24, 43-33, 51-50
Pts: D. Gim, 16; Rebs: D. Gim, 9 Asts: D. Gim, 5		Pts: Q. Xulei, 13; Rebs: Q. Xulei, 14; Asts: Y. Lei, 5

Bangkok Youth Center Court 1

18 January 2024
15:00

Statistics

Japan	92–27	Thailand
Scoring by quarter: 22-4, 40-13, 65-19, 92-27
Pts: Y. Takamatsu, 18; Rebs: K. Akita, 10; Asts: R. Akaishi, 7		Rebs: A. Jumjarean, 5

Bangkok Youth Center Court 1

18 January 2024
17:00

Statistics

Iran	81–41	Afghanistan
Scoring by quarter: 33-10, 48-24, 66-27, 81-41
Pts: M. Abedi, 17; Rebs: M. Abedi, 12; Asts: O. Hadiazhar, 5		Pts: A. Afzali, 11; Rebs: S. Sadat, 11; Asts: S. Sadat, 4

Bangkok Youth Center Court 1

18 January 2024
19:00

Statistics

Australia	92–20	Saudi Arabia
Scoring by quarter: 28-4, 44-14, 69-14, 92-20
Pts: T. Knowles, 22; Rebs: B. Latham, 10; Asts: T. Knowles, 8		Rebs: A. Albishi, 9

Bangkok Youth Center Court 1

==== Semi finals ====
19 January 2024
14:30

Statistics

Iran	63–48	Japan
Scoring by quarter: 23-16, 25-26, 39-32, 63-48
Pts: M. Abedi, 17; Rebs: M. Abbasishotoryeh, 9 Asts: O. Hadiazhar, 4		Pts: R. Chokai, 15; Rebs: R. Chokai, 10; Asts: R. Chokai, 7

Bangkok Youth Center Court 1

19 January 2024
16:30

Statistics

Australia	56–51	South Korea
Scoring by quarter: 14-12, 28-27, 40-41, 56-51
Pts: B. Latham, 23; Rebs: B. Latham, 13; Asts: T. Knowles, 7		Pts: S. Kim, 17; Rebs: D. Gim, 13; Asts: S. Cho, 10

Bangkok Youth Center Court 1

==== Bronze medal ====
20 January 2024
12:30

Statistics

Japan	45–53	South Korea
Scoring by quarter: 10-9, 19-22, 31-36, 45-53
Pts: D. Gim, 23; Rebs: D. Gim, 16; Asts: D. Gim, 7		Pts: H. Kozai, 12; Rebs: R. Chokai, 10; Asts: R. Chokai, 9

Bangkok Youth Center Court 1

==== Gold medal ====
20 January 2024
16:30

Statistics

Australia	53–51	Iran
Scoring by quarter: 20-9, 28-27, 38-35, 53-51
Pts: T. O'Neill-Thorne, 18; Rebs: B. Latham, 14; Asts: T. Knowles, 9		Pts: M. Abbasishotoryeh, 12; Rebs: M. Abedi, 9 Asts: M. Tolouie Tamardash, 3

Bangkok Youth Center Court 1

=== Men's Final Standings ===
Rank	Team
1	Australia *
2	Iran **
3	South Korea
4	Japan
5	China
6	Thailand
7	Saudi Arabia
8	Afghanistan
9	Philippines
10	United Arab Emirates
11	New Zealand

^{*} Qualified directly for Paris 2024
^{**} Qualified for 2024 IWBF Men's Repechage

== Women's competition ==
Pool A played a double round-robin, while Pool B played a single round-robin. The top team in Pool B and all the teams in Pool A earned a place in the semi-finals.

=== Pool A ===
Team	Pld	W	L	PF	PA	PD	Pts
China	4	4	0	227	103	+124	8
Japan	4	2	2	146	174	-28	6
Australia	4	0	4	116	212	-96	4

13 January 2024
19:30

Statistics

Australia	21–69	China
Scoring by quarter: 6-12, 10-36, 19-52, 21-69
Pts: G. Munro Cook, 8 Rebs: G. Munro Cook, 8 Asts: S. Matheson, 5		Pts: S. Lin, 12; Rebs: M. Zhang, 8 Asts: S. Lin, 9

Bangkok Youth Center Court 1

14 January 2024
15:00

Statistics

China	50–29	Japan
Scoring by quarter: 18-7, 28-12, 42-22, 50-29
Pts: S. Lin, 16; Rebs: S. Lin, 9 Asts: X. Chen, 5		Pts: M. Amimoto, 9 Rebs: C. Kitada, 13; Asts: M. Amimoto, 2

Bangkok Youth Center Court 2

15 January 2024
12:30

Statistics

Australia	37–41	Japan
Scoring by quarter: 14-8, 20-16, 26-34, 37-41
Pts: G. Munro Cook, 16; Rebs: G. Munro Cook, 11; Asts: S. Matheson, 5		Pts: M. Hagino, 12; Rebs: M. Amimoto, 10; Asts: M. Amimoto, 6

Bangkok Youth Center Court 1

16 January 2024
11:00

Statistics

China	54–25	Australia
Scoring by quarter: 13-8, 29-13, 41-22, 54-25
Pts: X. Zhang, 18; Rebs: X. Zhang, 15; Asts: S. Lin, 9		Pts: H. Dodd, 14; Rebs: G. Munro Cook, 13; Asts: G. Munro Cook, 6

Bangkok Youth Center Court 2

17 January 2024
14:30

Statistics

Japan	28–54	China
Scoring by quarter: 4-17, 11-30, 21-47, 28-54
Pts: M. Amimoto, 13; Rebs: M. Amimoto, 7 Asts: A. Yanagimoto, 2		Pts: X. Zhang, 13; Rebs: X. Zhang, 7 Asts: S. Lin, 7

Bangkok Youth Center Court 1

18 January 2024
13:00

Statistics

Australia	33–48	Japan
Scoring by quarter: 7-4, 21-18, 29-32, 33-48
Pts: G. Munro Cook, 13; Rebs: G. Munro Cook, 11; Asts: G. Munro Cook, 7		Pts: M. Hagino, 10; Rebs: M. Amimoto, 6 Asts: M. Amimoto, 6

Bangkok Youth Center Court 2

=== Pool B ===
Team	Pld	W	L	PF	PA	PD	Pts
Thailand	5	5	0	335	94	+241	10
Cambodia	5	4	1	264	164	+100	9
Asia-Oceania Zone	5	3	2	168	206	-38	8
Laos	5	2	3	159	196	-37	7
Philippines	5	1	4	109	227	-118	6
India	5	0	5	109	257	-148	5

13 January 2024
09:30

Statistics

Thailand	63–8	India
Scoring by quarter: 29-2, 41-4, 55-4, 63-8
Pts: P. Putthanoi, 21; Rebs: P. Putthanoi, 15; Asts: W. Thamlaaied, 4		Pts: B. Mazire, 4 Rebs: M. Jadhav, 12

Bangkok Youth Center Court 1

13 January 2024
11:30

Statistics

Laos	31–36	Asia-Oceania Zone
Scoring by quarter: 7-8, 19-14, 27-26, 31-36
Pts: P. Keopaseuth, 12; Rebs: P. Keopaseuth, 10; Asts: P. Keopaseuth, 7		Pts: L. Sakhi Zada, 24; Rebs: L. Sakhi Zada, 16; Asts: R. Alomari, 5

Bangkok Youth Center Court 1

13 January 2024
15:30

Statistics

Philippines	12–39	Cambodia
Scoring by quarter: 2-15, 4-21, 6-29, 12-39
Pts: P. Castro, 6 Rebs: P. Castro, 20; Asts: E. Moa, 4		Pts: S. Lak, 7 Rebs: E. Srey Mom, 8

Bangkok Youth Center Court 1

14 January 2024
16:30

Statistics

Asia-Oceania Zone	29–73	Cambodia
Scoring by quarter: 10-10, 18-28, 26-45, 29-73
Pts: L. Sakhi Zada, 11; Rebs: L. Sakhi Zada, 14; Asts: R. Alomari, 3		Pts: S. An, 22; Rebs: S. An, 11; Asts: P. Pheung, 9

Bangkok Youth Center Court 1

14 January 2024
17:00

Statistics

India	34–42	Philippines
Scoring by quarter: 7-12, 15-23, 30-34, 34-42
Pts: M. Jadhav, 12; Rebs: M. Jadhav, 12; Asts: G. Chouhan, 3		Pts: P. Castro, 20; Rebs: C. Wells, 19; Asts: C. Wells, 7

Bangkok Youth Center Court 2

14 January 2024
18:30

Statistics

Laos	20–79	Thailand
Scoring by quarter: 4-18, 8-32, 12-44, 20-79
Pts: N. Ponin, 19; Rebs: W. Thamlaaied, 12; Asts: N. Ponin, 6		Pts: V. Khammykoun, 8 Rebs: N. Kasien, 10

Bangkok Youth Center Court 1

15 January 2024
11:00

Statistics

Cambodia	66–33	India
Scoring by quarter: 20-6, 34-19, 54-23, 66-33
Pts: S. Lak, 18; Rebs: C. Doung, 7 Asts: P. Pheung, 5		Pts: N. Gupta, 8 Rebs: M. Jadhav, 7 Asts: L. Rayannavar, 4

Bangkok Youth Center Court 2

15 January 2024
13:00

Statistics

Philippines	16–37	Laos
Scoring by quarter: 0-11, 6-20, 12-29, 16-37
Pts: P. Castro, 10; Rebs: P. Castro, 17; Asts: P. Castro, 2		Pts: N. Kasien, 12; Rebs: N. Kasien, 9 Asts: P. Keopaseuth, 6

Bangkok Youth Center Court 2

15 January 2024
16:30

Statistics

Thailand	53–21	Asia-Oceania Zone
Scoring by quarter: 11-2, 32-4, 45-15, 53-21
Pts: S. Nanthasombat, 15; Rebs: W. Thamlaaied, 12; Asts: W. Thamlaaied, 5		Pts: R. Alomari, 9 Rebs: R. Alomari, 17; Asts: L. Sakhi Zada, 5

Bangkok Youth Center Court 1

16 January 2024
10:30

Statistics

Philippines	10–77	Thailand
Scoring by quarter: 2-25, 6-42, 8-58, 10-77
Pts: C. Wells, 6 Rebs: J. Follero, 8 Asts: N. Ponin, 7		Pts: N. Ponin, 23; Rebs: P. Putthanoi, 5

Bangkok Youth Center Court 1

16 January 2024
16:30

Statistics

Asia-Oceania Zone	42–20	India
Scoring by quarter: 8-1, 24-2, 36-12, 42-20
Pts: R. Alomari, 18; Rebs: R. Alomari, 20; Asts: R. Alomari, 5		Pts: M. Jadhav, 8 Rebs: G. Chouhan, 8 Asts: R. Gupta, 1

Bangkok Youth Center Court 1

16 January 2024
17:00

Statistics

Laos	27–51	Cambodia
Scoring by quarter: 6-9, 15-17, 22-31, 27-51
Pts: S. An, 15; Rebs: S. An, 14; Asts: S. An, 10		Pts: P. Phoukhong, 13; Rebs: V. Khammykoun, 12; Asts: P. Keopaseuth, 5

Bangkok Youth Center Court 2

17 January 2024
10:30

Statistics

India	14–44	Laos
Scoring by quarter: 4-6, 12-18, 14-32, 14-44
Pts: B. Mazire, 4 Rebs: G. Chouhan, 12; Asts: A. Alisha, 1		Pts: V. Khammykoun, 16; Rebs: N. Kasien, 9 Asts: P. Keopaseuth, 9

Bangkok Youth Center Court 1

17 January 2024
13:00

Statistics

Asia-Oceania Zone	40–29	Philippines
Scoring by quarter: 14-6, 24-14, 34-25, 40-29
Pts: R. Alomari, 10; Rebs: L. Sakhi Zada, 17; Asts: R. Alomari, 6		Pts: C. Wells, 14; Rebs: C. Wells, 12; Asts: C. Wells, 1

Bangkok Youth Center Court 2

17 January 2024
17:00

Statistics

Thailand	63–35	Cambodia
Scoring by quarter: 18-8, 33-14, 45-23, 63-35
Pts: N. Ponin, 34; Rebs: P. Putthanoi, 9 Asts: W. Thamlaaied, 6		Pts: S. An, 16; Rebs: S. An, 14; Asts: S. An, 4

Bangkok Youth Center Court 2

18 January 2024
15:00

Statistics

Philippines	23–22	India
Scoring by quarter: 4-5, 9-13, 15-17, 23-22
Pts: C. Wells, 14; Rebs: C. Wells, 14; Asts: C. Wells, 2		Pts: M. Sanningannavar, 15; Rebs: M. Sanningannavar, 12; Asts: M. Jadhav, 3

Bangkok Youth Center Court 2

=== Placement matches ===
==== 7th-8th place ====
19 January 2024
11:00

Statistics

Laos	51–20	Philippines
Scoring by quarter: 12-4, 26-8, 36-14, 51-20
Pts: V. Khammykoun, 18; Rebs: P. Phoukhong, 7 Asts: N. Kasien, 7		Pts: P. Castro, 12; Rebs: C. Wells, 10; Asts: C. Wells, 3

Bangkok Youth Center Court 2

==== 6th-7th place ====
18 January 2024
17:00

Statistics

Asia-Oceania Zone	38–25	Laos
Scoring by quarter: 12-8, 22-12, 28-17, 38-25
Pts: R. Alomari, 12; Rebs: R. Alomari, 17; Asts: R. Alomari, 3		Pts: N. Kasien, 12; Rebs: V. Khammykoun, 15; Asts: P. Phoukhong, 3

Bangkok Youth Center Court 2

==== 5th-6th place ====
19 January 2024
13:00

Statistics

Cambodia	34–41	Asia-Oceania Zone
Scoring by quarter: 8-4, 12-17, 19-31, 34-41
Pts: C. Ho, 11; Rebs: C. Ho, 10; Asts: S. Lak, 4		Pts: L. Sakhi Zada, 14; Rebs: R. Alomari, 18; Asts: R. Alomari, 7

Bangkok Youth Center Court 2

=== Finals ===
Finals
10:30 19 January 2024
China	69
Thailand	36
12:30 19 January 2024
Japan	46
Australia	33

Gold medal
14:30 20 January 2024
China	54
Japan	35
Bronze medal
10:30 20 January 2024
Australia	47
Thailand	41

==== Semi finals ====
19 January 2024
10:30

Statistics

China	69–36	Thailand
Scoring by quarter: 21-8, 35-19, 48-27, 69-36
Pts: S. Lin, 21; Rebs: G. Lyu, 8 Asts: T. Zhang, 7		Pts: N. Ponin, 10; Rebs: P. Putthanoi, 11

Bangkok Youth Center Court 1

19 January 2024
12:30

Statistics

Japan	46–33	Australia
Scoring by quarter: 14-10, 29-18, 34-29, 46-33
Pts: C. Kitada, 17; Rebs: M. Amimoto, 11; Asts: M. Amimoto, 10		Pts: G. Munro Cook, 14; Rebs: G. Munro Cook, 9 Asts: S. Matheson, 9

Bangkok Youth Center Court 1

==== Bronze medal ====
20 January 2024
10:30

Statistics

Australia	47–41	Thailand
Scoring by quarter: 8-15, 23-21, 34-25, 47-41
Pts: G. Munro Cook, 19; Rebs: G. Munro Cook, 13; Asts: S. Matheson, 10		Pts: S. Nanthasombat, 16; Rebs: P. Putthanoi, 11; Asts: W. Thamlaaied, 5

Bangkok Youth Center Court 1

==== Gold medal ====
20 January 2024
14:30

Statistics

China	54–35	Japan
Scoring by quarter: 8-12, 21-22, 45-28, 54-35
Pts: X. Zhang, 29; Rebs: S. Lin, 12; Asts: T. Zhang, 8		Pts: C. Kitada, 14; Rebs: C. Kitada, 11; Asts: C. Kitada, 4

Bangkok Youth Center Court 1

== Women's Final Standings ==
Rank	Team
1	China *
2	Japan **
3	Thailand **
4	Australia **
5	Asia-Oceania Zone
6	Cambodia
7	Laos
8	Philippines
9	India

^{*} Qualified directly for Paris 2024
^{**} Qualified directly for 2024 IWBF Women’s Repechage

== All Star Five Teams ==
=== Men’s All-Star Five ===
1.0 – 1.5 – (South Korea) Jun Seong Kwak
2.0 – 2.5 – (Japan) Renshi Chokai
3.0 – 3.5 – (China) Qin Xulei
4.0 – 4.5 – (Iran) Mohamadhassan Sayari
Most Valuable Player – (Australia) Bill Latham

=== Women’s All-Star Five ===
1.0 – 1.5 – (Japan) Mayo Hagino
2.0 – 2.5 – (Japan) Amane Yanagimoto
3.0 – 3.5 – (Thailand) Natnapa Ponin
4.0 – 4.5 – (China) Xuemei Zhang
Most Valuable Player – (China) Suiling Lin
