= List of current ambassadors of Thailand =

Below is a table of the current ambassadors of Thailand.

Host country^{[a]}	Appointed	Location of resident embassy	Ambassador	Ambassador's name in Thai	List	Embassy website
**Chile**; El Salvador; Costa Rica; Panama		Santiago	Sarikan Pholmani			
**Canada**; Bahamas; Jamaica; Dominican Republic; Saint Kitts and Nevis; Antigua and Barbuda; Dominica; Saint Lucia; Saint Vincent and the Grenadines; Barbados; Grenada; Trinidad and Tobago	26 February 2020	Ottawa	Kallayana Vipattipumiprates			
**Denmark**; Faroe Islands; Iceland; Greenland	2025	Copenhagen	Suphanvasa Chotikajan Tang			
**Egypt**; Sudan; Ethiopia; Eritrea; Djibouti	March 20, 2017	Cairo	Chainarong Keratiyutwong	ชัยณรงค์ กีรติยุตวงศ์		
**Mexico**; Guatemala; Belize; Honduras; Nicaragua; Cuba	April 11, 2017	Mexico City	Rommanee Kananurak			
**Peru**; Colombia; Venezuela; Ecuador; Bolivia		Lima	Sorayut Chasombat			
**United Kingdom**; Republic of Ireland		London	Pisanu Suvanajat	พิษณุ สุวรรณะชฎ		
**United States**	2024	Washington, D.C.	Dr. Suriya Chindawongse			[8]
**United States** (Permanent Mission to United Nations); Haiti; Marshall Islands; Nauru; Tuvalu		New York City				

^{[a]} Countries marked in bold host a Thai embassy with diplomatic missions to additional countries
