= Sorawong Thienthong =

Thai politician

- สรวงศ์ เทียนทอง
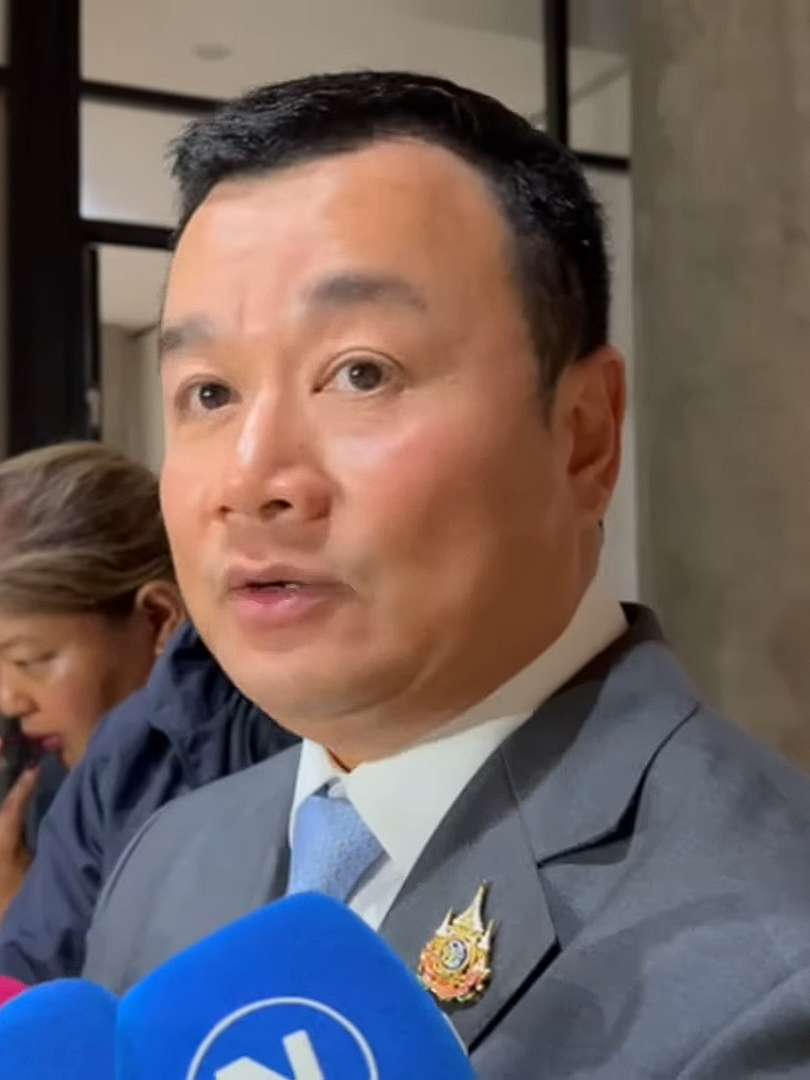

Minister of Tourism and Sports
- In office 3 September 2024 – 19 September 2025
- Prime Minister: Paetongtarn Shinawatra
- Preceded by: Sermsak Pongpanich
- Succeeded by: Atthakorn Sirilatthayakorn

Deputy Minister of Health
- In office 30 June 2013 – 22 May 2014

Secretary General of the Pheu Thai Party
- Incumbent
- Assumed office 27 October 2023

Personal details
- Born: July 28, 1975 (age 51)
- Party: Pheu Thai
- Other political affiliations: Thai Rak Thai (2002–2007); Pracharat (2007–2011)
- Spouse: Yanika Thienthong
- Parent(s): Sanoh Thienthong (father); Uraiwan Thienthong (mother)
- Education: Johnson & Wales University

Sorawong Thienthong (Thai: สรวงศ์ เทียนทอง, RTGS: Sorawong Thianthong; born 28 July 1975) is a Thai politician and minister of tourism and sports, serving since 2024. He is the son of Sanoh Thienthong, who served as Minister of Interior from 1996 to 1997 and Minister of Public Health from 1995 to 1996.

== Royal decorations ==
Sorawong has received the following royal decorations in the Honours System of Thailand:

- 2013 - Knight Grand Cordon of the Most Exalted Order of the White Elephant
- 2010 - Knight Grand Cordon of The Most Noble Order of the Crown of Thailand
