= Kuwait men's national wheelchair basketball team =

Kuwait
- IWBF zone: IWBF Asia+Oceania

Paralympic Games
- Appearances: 0

World Championships
- Appearances: 0

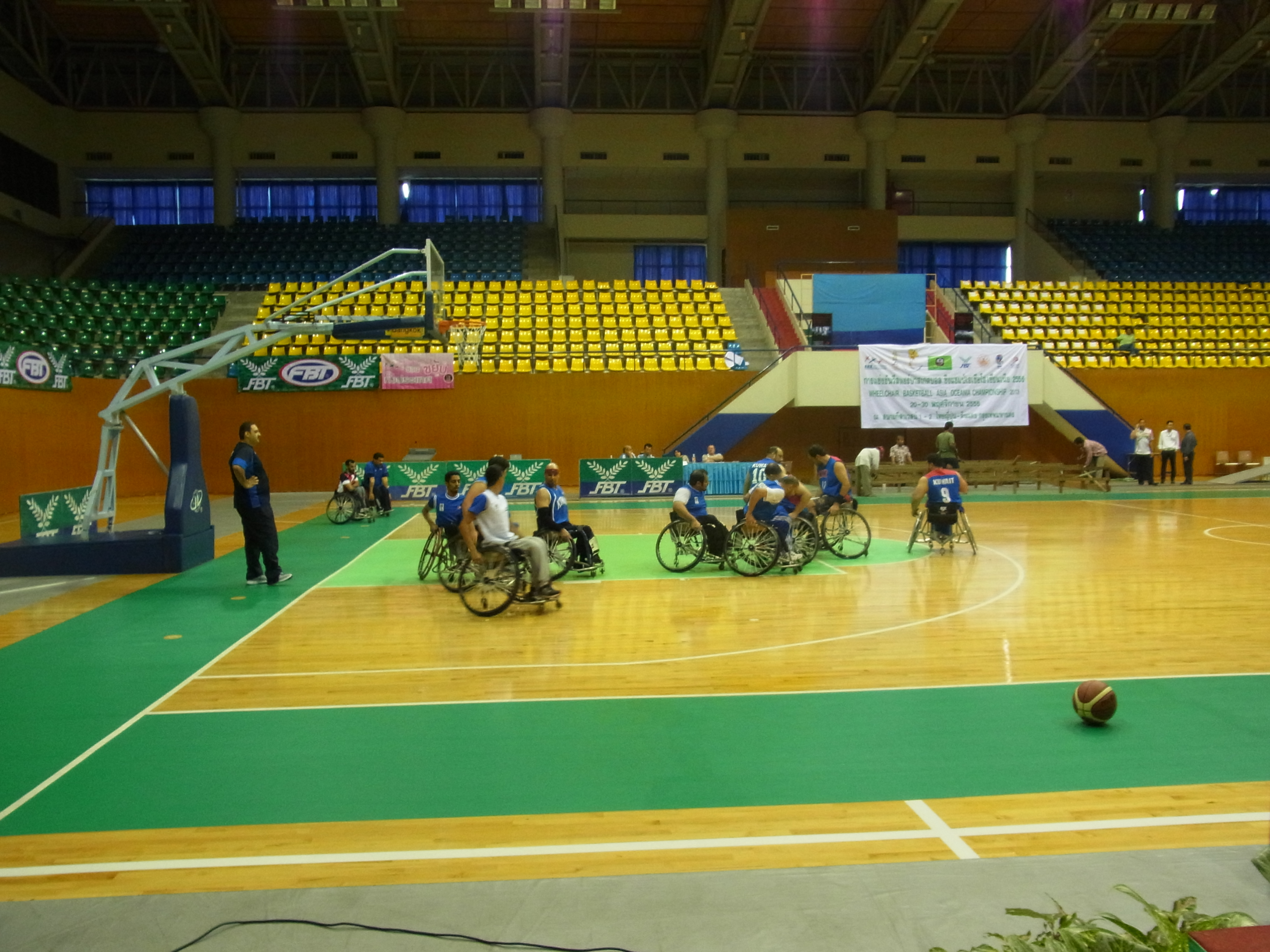
Wheelchair Basketball Asia Oceania Championship 2013

The Kuwait men's national wheelchair basketball team is the wheelchair basketball side that represents Kuwait in international competitions for men as part of the International Wheelchair Basketball Federation. They are part of the Kuwait Disabled Sport Club.

== Current roster ==
The team's current roster for the 2014 Wheelchair Basketball World Championship is:

Head coach:

#	Name	Class.
4	Almutairi	1.5
5	Mohammad	3.5
6	Algharib	3.0
7	Alfailakawi	3.0
8	-
9	Alfadhli	1.5
10	Nasir	4.0
11	Jamal	4.5
12	Abdullah	4.0
13	Aldousari	1.0
14	Aladwani	1.5
15	Ajeel	1.0

== Competitions ==
The Kuwait team has not competed at the Wheelchair Basketball World Championship or at the Summer Paralympics.

=== Other ===
Year	Position	W	L
(Kuwait) 2013			
