= National Soft Power Strategy Committee =

Agency overview
- Formed: September 13, 2023; 2 years ago
- Agency executive: Paetongtarn Shinawatra, Chairman of the Board; Vice Chairman of the Board

The National Soft Power Strategy Committee (Thai: คณะกรรมการยุทธศาสตร์ซอฟต์พาวเวอร์แห่งชาติ) is a committee established in accordance with Order of the Office of the Prime Minister No. 230/2023 dated September 13, 2023, as a result of the order of Srettha Thavisin, the Prime Minister at the first cabinet meeting, to drive soft power within the country according to the 1 family 1 soft power policy, of the Pheu Thai Party. With Srettha as chairman of the board, Paetongtarn Shinawatra as Vice Chairman of the Board, and Suraphong Suebwonglee as Director and Secretary. The first meeting was held on October 3. In addition, a National Soft Power Development Committee has been appointed to drive soft power policies in various areas and present them to the full committee, with Paethongtarn as the chairman. And since January 9, 2024, the Strategic Transformation Office has been assigned to drive Thailand's soft power strategy.

However, the previous National Soft Power Strategy Committee ended on August 14, 2024, when Srettha stepped down as Prime Minister. Later on October 16, 2024, Paethongtarn Shinawatra, the next Prime Minister, signed Prime Minister's Office Order No. 367/2024, appointing the 2nd National Soft Power Strategy Committee, with Paethongtarn, as Prime Minister, moving up to become the Chairwoman.

After the Thailand Creative Culture Agency Act comes into effect, the National Soft Power Strategy Committee will transform into the National Creative Culture Policy Committee and oversee the Thailand Creative Culture Agency. However, the National Soft Power Strategy Committee will continue to act as the National Creative Culture Policy Committee until the appointment of qualified members of the National Creative Culture Policy Committee is complete, at which point the National Soft Power Strategy Committee will be completely dissolved.

== Operations ==
=== Committee No. 1 ===
On October 3, 2023, there was a meeting of the National Soft Power Strategy Committee No. 1/2023 at Santi Maitri Building, Government House, where the meeting resolved to appoint a National Soft Power Development Committee to drive, monitor and supervise operations, chaired by Paethongtarn Shinawatra, with representatives from the private sector and representatives from government agencies, state enterprises and public organizations as committee members. The Prime Minister also gave policies to relevant government and private agencies to organize tourism promotion activities, along with promoting soft power in various areas to attract more tourists to visit Thailand at the end of the year. Paethongtarn, as Vice Chairwoman of the National Soft Power Strategy Committee, announced the push for the 1 Family 1 Soft Power project and the THACCA organization in 3 steps: 1. Promoting and cultivating the potential of 20 million people from 20 million households; 2. Establishing THACCA to develop 11 soft power industries: food, sports, festivals, tourism, music, books, movies, games, art, design, and fashion; and 3. Spreading Thailand's soft power to the world through cultural diplomacy, divided into 3 goals: Open registration to receive potential development within 100 days, propose the draft THACCA Act within 6 months, and create highly skilled and creative workers, including sending the draft THACCA Act to the House of Representatives within 1 year.

On January 9, 2024, there was a meeting of the National Soft Power Strategy Committee No. 1/2024 where the meeting approved 5 important matters:

1. Agree on the proposals for the soft power industry, targeting all 11 branches, namely festivals, tourism, food, art, design, sports, music, books, movies, dramas and series, fashion and gaming.
2. Approve the budget framework for supporting entrepreneurs to participate in 3 foreign film festivals, in the amount of 3 billion baht.
3. Agree on the principles for organizing the Songkran Festival in Thailand under the name "Maha Songkran World Water Festival".
4. Agreed the Office of the National Reform Steering National Strategy and Creating Unity and Reconciliation, is the main agency in driving the soft power development strategy, with a duty to operate, integrate and drive relevant agencies to study, analyze and prepare soft power development plans power budget allocation carrying out various projects/activities with efficiency and effectiveness Reduce duplication, follow up and expedite the process of reviewing, amending, amending, canceling, and creating laws and regulations related to the development of 11 soft power industries of government agencies, in order to comply with the resolutions of the committee and various subcommittees related and coordinate and create cooperation between the government agencies, the private sector, and civil society in developing soft power, coordinating and integrating the dissemination of information on 11 soft power industries, as well as disseminating progress and results of operations regarding with the development of the country's soft power.
5. Agreed to appoint additional directors as follows:
  1. In the National Soft Power Strategy Committee appointed to
    1. Director of the Budget Bureau and the Secretary-General of the Council of State is a member.
    2. Director of the Office National Reform Steering National Strategy and Creating Unity and Reconciliation is a member and assistant secretary.
  2. In the National Soft Power Development Committee appointed to
    1. Permanent Secretary of the Ministry of Interior and Director of the Digital Government Development Agency are member.
    2. Director of the Office National Reform Steering, National Strategy, and Creating Unity and Reconciliation is a member and co-secretary.

Later, on April 22, 2024, the National Soft Power Strategy Committee meeting 2/2024 was held at Santi Maitri Building, Government House, where the Prime Minister gave a policy that each field should prepare for the development of industries and people from the upstream to the downstream in order to cover all groups of people. Especially those who are starting to practice or learn to build a career in the future. He has given 3 work policies, including acknowledging the order to appoint an additional National Soft Power Strategy Committee and acknowledging the results of the meeting of the National Soft Power Development Committee.

=== Committee No. 2 ===
On December 24, 2024, the 1/2024 National Soft Power Strategy Committee meeting (the 3rd meeting of 2024 if including both groups) was held at the Bhakdi Bodin Building, Government House. The meeting considered the appointment of subcommittees, budget allocation requests, the Thailand Creative Culture Agency Bill, and the organization of the Soft Power Forum. The budget was approved for two subcommittees to drive the industry, chaired by M.R. Chalermchatri Yukol: Film, Documentary, and Animation, and Drama and Series, to support the production of films, dramas, series, documentaries, and animation in Thailand in 2025 with a budget of 200 million baht.

Later, on March 19, 2025, the 1/2025 National Soft Power Strategy Committee meeting was held at the Bhakdi Bordin Building, Government House. The meeting approved three important matters:

1. Order the Revenue Department, Ministry of Finance, to issue tax measures to promote the art industry, such as tax deductions for buyers of visual arts up to 100,000 baht, increasing the deduction of artist's tax calculation expenses to 60%, and setting up duty-free zones for art galleries to exempt import duties on all types of art within April, organizing activities to open space for youth, the Thai Youth Street Arts project to drive Thailand towards becoming a world-class art center, and preparing for the Songkran festival throughout Thailand, inviting Thai people to join in wearing elephant pants or provincial pants to promote local identity during the Songkran festival.
2. Organize the Thai Youth Street Arts project, a mural painting competition for high school and university students. In the first phase, 46 institutions from 33 provinces will compete on March 29 and 30 to win scholarships from the Government Lottery Office worth 500,000 baht, as well as a plaque of honor from the Prime Minister and certificates from the Minister of Education, the Minister of Higher Education, Science, Research and Innovation, and Bangkok. In the second phase, the competition will be for scholarships to study arts abroad.
3. Acknowledged the organization of the Maha Songkran Festival under the name "Maha Songkran World Water Festival 2025" during 11–15 April 2025 at Sanam Luang. By approving a budget of 150 million baht, which the Budget Bureau has approved from the request of the National Soft Power Development Committee, for holding the event at the said location and in important provincial cities. Which is separated from the budget of the Tourism Authority of Thailand, which is used to organize Songkran events throughout the country. The Prime Minister has given a policy for people to wear Thai fabrics and pants with provincial patterns to promote the identity of each locality.

== National Softpower Development Committee ==
Later, on October 3, 2023, after the National Soft Power Strategy Committee meeting No. 1/2023 ended, Prime Minister Srettha Thavisin signed an order appointing another committee it's called National Soft Power Development Committee, to act as a push and steering soft power policy in various areas to make progress and present it to the National Soft Power Strategy Committee, to consider.

This committee has Paetongtarn Shinawatra as chairman, Dr. Suraphong Suebwonglee as vice- chairman, Pansak Winyarat as advisor and director along with another 46 members, totaling 49 people, such as the Governor of Bangkok, the Permanent Secretary of the Ministry of High Education, Science, Research and Innovation, the Permanent Secretary of the Ministry of Culture, the Director-General of the Department of Provincial Administration, the Director-General of the Community Development Department, the Governor of the Tourism Authority of Thailand, the Governor of Sports Authority of Thailand, and Director of the Village Fund Office, etc. The first meeting will be held on October 25, 2023 at 2:00 p.m. (Thai Standard Time) at the Witaed Samosorn meeting room, Ministry of Foreign Affairs and will meet regularly, once per month.

However, the previous National Soft Power Development Committee ended on August 14, 2024, due to Srettha stepped down from Prime Minister. Later on October 16, Paethongtarn Shinawatra, the next Prime Minister, signed Prime Minister's Office Order No. 368/2024, appointing the second National Soft Power Development Committee, with Dr. Surapong Suebwonglee as chairman.

=== Project Implementation ===
On November 30, 2023, the National Softpower Development Committee Meeting No. 2/2023 resolved to approve in principle that the agencies responsible for 11 areas of Thai Soft power projects, activities, and industries proposed using a budget of 5,164 million baht as follows:

areas	budget
Festival	1009 million baht
Tourism	711 million baht
Food	1000 million baht
Art	380 million baht
Design	310 million baht
Muay Thai	500 million baht
Music	144 million baht
Book	69 million baht
Film Drama and Series	545 Million baht
Fashion	268 million baht
Game and Esports	374 million baht

The budget will be reviewed with the Bureau of the Budget by December 14, 2023, before being sent to the National Soft Power Strategy Committee for consideration again on January 9, 2024.

Later on January 4, 2024, the National Softpower Development Committee Meeting No. 1/2024 was held with a total of 3 matters being considered: Amending the film censorship process, establishing One Stop Service, and proposing the draft THACCA Act or Thailand Creative Content Agency, to be considered by House of Representatives and Senate during August–September 2024, including the establishment of the Thai Film Council the same is true of the Korean Film Council of South Korea.

=== Famous people in the subcommittee ===
In addition, two additional sub-committee members were appointed: Chanon Santinatornkul, a famous movie and television drama actor, in the field of film, and Phonphan Techarungchaikul, the Chief Executive Officer of RS Music Company Limited in the field of music, by has order of the National Soft Power Development Board No. 1/2024 appointing Chanon officially on January 9, 2024 after a meeting of the National Soft Power Strategy Committee. Also on the same day There was also an order the National Soft Power Development Board No. 2/2024 appointing three additional sub-committee members: Chookiat Sakveerakul, a famous film and series director, Worarit Nilklom, former host and director of the Y series and Nonglak Ngamroj, CEO of RS Multimedia and Entertainment Company Limited (Channel 8) in dramas and series.
