= 2018 Wheelchair Basketball World Championship squads =

List of squads for teams competing in the 2018 Wheelchair Basketball World Championship

The following is the list of squads for the teams competing in the 2018 Wheelchair Basketball World Championship (Rollstuhlbasketball Weltmeisterschaft 2018), held in Hamburg, Germany, between 16 and 26 August 2018. Each team selected a squad of 12 players for the tournament.

Athletes are given an eight-level-score specific to wheelchair basketball, ranging from 0.5 to 4.5. Lower scores represent a higher degree of disability. The sum score of all players on the court cannot exceed 14.

== Women ==
=== Pool A ===
==== Australia ====
Head coach: David Gould
Assistant coaches: Stephen Charlton and Craig Campbell

#	Name	Class.
4	Sarah Vinci	1.0
5	Cobi Crispin	4.0
6	Hannah Dodd	1.0
7	Shelley Cronau	3.0
8	Georgia Munro-Cook	4.5
9	Leanne Del Toso	3.5
10	Clare Nott	1.0
11	Kylie Gauci	2.0
13	Annabelle Lindsay	4.5
12	Shelley Chaplin	3.5
14	Ella Sabljak	1.0
15	Amber Merritt	4.5

==== Great Britain ====
Head coach: Miles Thompson
Assistant coach: Dan Price

#	Name	Class.
4	Charlotte Moore	1.0
5	Sophie Carrigill	1.0
6	Michaela Bell	1.5
7	Helen Freeman	4.0
8	Laurie Williams	2.5
9	Judith Hamer	4.0
10	Amy Conroy	4.0
11	Madeleine Thompson	4.0
12	Leah Evans	2.0
13	Siobhan Fitzpatrick	3.0
14	Joy Haizelden	2.5
15	Robyn Love	3.5

==== Brazil ====
Head coach: Cristiane Bonilha Borreggio Antonelli

#	Name	Class.
4	Cleonete de Nazare Santos Reis	2.0
5	Andreia Santa Rosa Farias	1.0
6	Perla Dos Santos Assuncao	2.0
7	Lucicleia da Costa e Costa	2.5
8	Rosilia Ramos da Silva	1.5
9	Ana Aurelia Mendes Rosa	3.5
10	Oara Uchoa Assucao	4.0
11	Monica Andrade Santos Silva	4.5
12	Silvelane Da Silva Oliviera	3.0
13	Maxcleide de Deus Ramos	1.0
14	Paola Klokler	4.0
15	Vileide Brito de Almeida	4.5

==== Netherlands ====
Head coach: Gertjan van der Linden
Assistant coach: Irene Sloof

#	Name	Class.
4	Ilse Arts	1.5
5	Lindsay Frelink	2.0
6	Jitske Visser	1.0
7	Dagmar van Hinte	4.5
8	Julia van der Sprong	3.0
9	Bo Kramer	4.5
10	Xena Wimmenhoeve	4.0
11	Cher Korver	2.5
12	Saskia Pronk	1.0
14	Carina de Rooij	3.0
15	Mariska Beijer	4.0
16	Amy Kauen	2.0

==== Canada ====
Head coach: Marc-Anotine Ducharme
Assistant coaches: Jason Eng and Simon Cass

#	Name	Class.
4	Rosalie Lalonde	3.0
5	Elodie Tessier	2.5
6	Arinn Young	4.5
7	Cindy Ouellet	3.5
8	Tamara Steeves	1.5
9	Maude Jacques	2.5
10	Puisand Lai	1.0
11	Tara Llanes	1.5
12	Sandrine Berube	4.5
13	Kady Dandeneau	4.5
14	Erica Gavel	4.5
15	Melanie Hawtin	1.5

==== Spain ====
Head coach: Adrian Garcia
Assistant coach: David Benitez

#	Name	Class.
4	Lourdes Ortega	4.5
5	Lucia Soria	2.5
6	Sonia Ruiz	2.5
7	Sira Moros	3.0
8	Beatriz Zudaire	3.0
9	Sara Revuelta	1.0
11	Virginia Perez	4.0
13	Victoria Alonso	4.0
15	Salmude Montiel	2.0
44	Gabriella Michell Navarro	3.5
51	Agurtane Eguiluz	3.0
86	Genoveva Tapia	4.5

=== Pool B ===
==== Algeria ====
Head coach: Djawed Zigh
Assistant Coach: Ahmed Taguiche

#	Name	Class.
4	Nebia Mehimda	1.0
5	Naqual Khedir	2.5
6	Yamina Ghoul	1.0
7	Hafida Belhadef	1.0
8	Fatima Bouzidi	2.0
9	Djamila Khemgani	4.5
10	Halima Kedjoun	4.5
11	Dahbia Semati	2.5
12	Kheira Zairi	3.5
13	Zohra Sellami	1.0
14	Samiha Abdelali	4.5
15	Nourhane Boublal	4.5

==== France ====
Head coach: Pascal Montet
Assistant Coach: Carolina Vincenzoni

#	Name	Class.
4	Sandrella Awad	1.0
5	Oumy Fall	2.5
6	Grace Wembolua	4.0
7	Agneska Glemp-Atavard	1.0
8	Lucie Nollet	2.0
9	Fabinenne Saint Omer-Delepine	4.5
10	Anne-Sophie Rubler	1.5
11	Marie Carliez	2.0
12	Solenn Thieurmel	4.5
13	Annabelle Picut-Alixe	3.0
14	Marianne Buso	4.5
15	Agélique Pichon	4.5

==== Argentina ====
Head coach: Carlos Ariel Cardelli
Assistant coach: Cesar Manuel Cairo

#	Name	Class.
4	Evangelina Paiva Barquinero	4.0
6	Maria Luisa Chirinos	1.0
7	Vanesa Natalia Salcedo	1.0
8	Mariana Belin Redi	3.0
9	Silvia Beatriz Linari	4.0
10	Maria Soledad Capedeville	4.5
11	Julieta Amanda Olmedo	2.5
12	Maria Fernanda Pallares	4.0
13	Mariana Berenice Perez	1.0
16	Elba Susana Gomez	3.0
20	Florencia Jessica Gonzalez Cabanas	2.5
22	Jasmin Sallis	1.5

==== Germany ====
Head coach: Martin Otto
Assistant coach: Janet McLachlan

#	Name	Class.
4	Mareike Miller	4.5
5	Johanna Welin	2.0
6	Catharina Weiss	1.0
7	Anne Patzwald	1.0
8	Laura Fürst	2.0
9	Katharina Lang	4.5
10	Lisa Nothelfer	1.0
11	Maya Lindholm	2.5
12	Annabel Breuer	1.5
13	Svenja Mayer	2.5
14	Marina Mohnen	4.5
15	Barbara Gross	4.5

==== China ====
Head coach: Tiehua Liu

#	Name	Class.
4	Tianjao Lei	4.5
5	Xuejing Chen	1.0
6	Xuemai Zhang	4.0
7	Guidi Lyu	4.0
8	Yun Long	1.5
9	Haizhen Cheng	4.5
10	Suiling Lin	3.0
11	Jiameng Dai	4.5
12	Tonglei Zhang	1.0
13	Yan Yang	4.0
14	Wenli Chen	1.0
15	Xiaolian Huang	2.0

==== United States ====
Head coach: Trooper Johnson
Assistant coaches: Adam Kramer and Amy Spangler

#	Name	Class.
1	Alejandra Ibanez	2.5
7	Josie Aslakson	1.0
10	Morgan Wood	3.0
13	Mackenzie Soldan	1.0
15	Rose Hollermann	3.5
21	Kaitlyn Eaton	1.5
23	Abby Dunkin	3.5
24	Lindsey Zurbrugg	2.5
34	Emily Oberst	4.5
35	Shelby Gruss	1.0
43	Bailey Moody	4.0
54	Ixhelt Gonzalez	4.5

== Men ==
=== Pool A ===
==== Canada ====
Head coach: Matteo Feriani
Assistant coach: Joey Johnson

#	Name	Class.
4	Nikola Goncin	4.5
5	Ben Moronchuk	4.5
6	Robert Hedges	2.5
7	Vincent Delaire	1.5
9	Colin Higgins	4.5
8	Garrett Ostepchuk	2.0
10	Lee Melymick	1.0
11	Chad Chassmen	1.5
12	Patrick Anderson	4.5
13	Jonathon Vermette	1.0
14	Tyler Miller	1.5
15	David Eng	4.5

==== Germany ====
Head coach: Nicholai Zeltinger
Assistant coach: Martin Kluck

#	Name	Class.
4	Philip Schorp	1.0
5	Nico Dreimüller	2.0
6	Jan Haller	2.0
7	Christopher Huber	1.0
8	Andre Bienek	3.0
9	Matthias Güntner	4.5
10	Kai Möller	3.0
11	Jan Sadler	3.0
12	Alexandr Halouski	4.5
13	Thomas Böhme	3.0
14	Frank Oehme	1.0
15	Jan Gans	4.0

==== Iran ====
Head coach: Nicholai Zeltinger
Assistant coach: Martin Kluck

#	Name	Class.
4	Adel Torfi Meneshidi	4.0
5	Omid Hadiazhar	4.0
6	Abojallil Gharanjik	1.5
7	Mohammadhasan Sayari	4.0
8	Morteza Abedi	3.0
9	Mohsen Tolouei Tamardsah	3.5
10	Faleh Ayashi	2.0
11	Saman Balaghi Einalou	1.0
12	Mohammad Mohammad Nezhad	1.0
13	Hassan Abdi	2.0
14	Hakim Mansoori	2.0
15	Morteza Ebrahimi	4.5

==== Morocco ====
Head coach: Rafael Ubaldo

#	Name	Class.
4	Zouhair Challat	2.5
5	Mohammed Oulini	2.5
6	Bilal Ben Hammam Lechhab	2.0
7	Najib Essahari	2.0
8	Samir El Hamyani	3.5
9	Mokthar Elghazziou	2.5
10	Abedillah Gani	1.5
11	Mounir Moujoud	1.0
12	Kamel Megrini	4.0
13	Rida Maatoui	3.5
14	Aissa Falempe	4.5
15	Adelkhak El Hasaoui	4.5

=== Pool B ===
==== Great Britain ====
Head coach:Haj Bhania
Assistant coach: Steve Caine

#	Name	Class.
4	Gaz Choudhry	4.0
5	Simon Brown	2.0
6	James MacSorley	2.0
7	Terry Bywater	4.5
8	George Bates	4.5
9	Harry Brown	2.5
10	Abdi Jama	1.0
11	Phil Pratt	3.0
12	Gregg Warburton	2.0
13	Martin Edwards	4.0
14	Lee Manning	4.5
15	Jim Palmer	1.0

==== Poland ====
Head coach:Piotr Luszynski
Assistant coaches: Arkadluiz Chlebda and Wojciech Makowski

#	Name	Class.
1	Krystof Pietrzyk	1.0
2	Marcin Baslcerowski	1.0
3	Piotr Darnikowski	1.0
4	Andreij Macek	1.5
5	Marek Bystrzycki	1.5
6	Kamil Kornacki	3.0
7	Krysztof Bandura	3.5
8	Adrian Labedzki	4.0
9	Marteusz Filipski	4.0
10	Dominik Mosler	4.0
11	Krystof Kozaryna	4.5
12	Piotr Luszynski	4.5

==== South Korea ====
Head coach:Sa Hyun
Assistant coach: Young Moo

#	Name	Class.
5	Woo Sung Hwang	2.0
7	Tam Ok Kim	2.5
10	Dong Suk Oh	2.0
11	Jun Seong Kwak	1.0
12	Dong Gil Yang	4.0
13	Sang Ha Baek	1.0
14	Dong Ju Lim	2.0
16	Youn Joo Lee	3.5
23	Seung Hyun Cho	4.0
28	Dong Hyeon Gim	4.0
32	Hu Suk Han	4.5
44	Byong Jai Lee	1.0

==== United States ====
Head coach: Trooper Johnson
Assistant coaches: Adam Kramer and Amy Spangler

#	Name	Class.
1	Jorge Sanchez	4.5
2	Jacob Williams	2.5
5	Michael Paye	3.0
8	Brian Bell	1.5
9	Matt Scott	3.5
11	Steve Serio	3.5
13	Ian Lynch	1.0
15	Nate Hinze	4.5
16	Trevon Jenifer	2.5
20	Jared Arambula	2.5
33	John Boie	1.0
42	Aaron Gouge	2.0

=== Pool C ===
==== Brazil ====
Head coach: Tago Joel Frank
Coaches: Tiago Costa Baptista and Sileno Santos

#	Name	Class.
4	Dwan Gomes dos Santos	1.0
5	Nataniel Alexandre da Silva	4.5
6	Erick Epamondas da Silva	3.5
7	Giebe Candido Alves da Silva	2.5
8	Paulo Cesar dos Santos	2.0
9	Lucardo Felipe da Silva	4.5
10	Wardenburg Nejim do Nascimento	2.0
11	Rodrigo Arao de Carvalho	1.0
12	Amuri Alves Viana	2.0
13	Landro de Miranda	4.5
14	Marcos Candido Sanchez da Silva	3.0
15	Gelson Jose da Silva Junior	3.0

==== Italy ====
Head coach: Carlo di Giusto
Assistant Coaches: Roberto Ceriscioli and Fabio Castellucci

#	Name	Class.
1	Diomineco Beltrame	3.5
2	Filippo Carossino	3.5
3	Simone de Maggi	4.5
4	Andrea Giaretti	4.0
5	Enrico Ghione	4.5
6	Gemnazzi Jacopo	4.0
7	Guido Maria Papi	4.0
8	Ahmed Raorahi	1.5
9	Francesco Santorelli	1.5
10	Davide Schiera	1.0
11	Claudo Spanu	1.0
12	Marco Stupenengo	2.5

==== Japan ====
Head coach: Shimper Oikawa
Assistant Coach: Kazuyki Kyoya

#	Name	Class.
2	Akira Toyoshima	2.0
5	Renshi Chokai	2.5
6	Rin Kawahara	1.5
7	Takuya Furusawa	3.0
10	Tetsuya Miyajima	4.0
11	Kyoshi Fujisawa	2.0
13	Reo Fujimoto	4.5
24	Naohiro Murukami	4.0
25	Kai Akita	3.5
26	Takayoshi Iwai	1.0
55	Hiroaki Kozai	3.5
92	Takahiro Akeda	1.0

==== Turkey ====
Head coach: Can Aksu

#	Name	Class.
1	Kemal Şafak	4.0
3	Kaan Dalay	2.0
5	Özgür Gürbulak	4.0
9	Uğur Toprak	3.0
10	Cem Gezinci	4.5
11	Fikri Gündoğdu	1.0
15	Selim Sayek	2.5
24	Deniz Acar	2.5
35	Ferit Gümüş	3.0
55	Murat Arslanoğlu	3.5
61	Metin Bahçekapılı	1.0
77	İsmail Ar	1.5

=== Pool D ===
==== Argentina ====
Head coach: Mauro Varela
Assistant coaches: Juna Dominguez, Lucas Barolin and Eduardo Gomez

#	Name	Class.
4	Alberto Esteche	2.0
5	Fernando Ovejero	3.0
6	Joel Gabas	4.0
7	Franco Alessandrini	1.0
8	Gustavo Villafane	1.0
9	Nicolas Valenzuela	1.0
10	Maximilian Ruggeri	2.5
11	Daniel Copa	4.5
12	Christian Gomez	4.5
13	Adrian Perez	3.0
14	Adolfo Berdun	3.5
15	Iván Gomez	3.0

==== Australia ====
Head coach: Craig Friday
Assistant coaches: Brad Ness

#	Name	Class.
4	Samuel White	1.0
5	Bill Latham	4.0
6	Kim Robbins	3.0
7	Shaun Norris	3.0
8	Steven Elliott	3.5
9	Tristan Knowles	4.0
10	Jannik Blair	1.0
11	Tom O'Neill-Thorne	3.0
12	Matthew McShane	1.5
13	Luke Pople	2.5
14	Brett Stibners	4.0
15	Michael Auprince	4.0

==== Netherlands ====
Head coach: Cees van Rootselaar

#	Name	Class.
0	Frank de Jong	1.0
1	Robin Poggenwisch	3.0
5	Walter Groen	2.5
6	Anton De Roou	1.0
10	Joost Morsinkhof	4.0
11	Mattjis Bellers	4.5
12	Gijs Even	4.5
3	Avril Cegil	1.5
2	Mendel op den Orth	4.0
15	Quinten Zantinge	3.0
17	Arie Twigt	3.5
23	Mustafa Korkmaz	3.0

==== Spain ====
Head coach: Oscar Trigo Diez
Assistant coaches: Javier Opez Martinez, Miguel Aquero Maestre and Javier Alvajal Pichel

#	Name	Class.
4	Daniel Stix Soto	1.5
7	Pablo Jesus Zarzuela Beltran	3.0
8	Francesco Javier Sanchez Lara	1.0
9	Alejandro Zarzuela Beltran	3.0
10	Amadou Tijane Diallo Diouff	3.0
11	Jordi Riuz Jordan	2.5
13	Garcia Pereiro	4.0
14	David Mouriz Dopico	2.5
17	Jesus Maria Romero Martin	3.0
21	Pablo Lavandeira Paoyato	1.0
24	Ignacio Ortega Lafuente	4.0
51	Agustín Alejos Alonso	4.5
