= Inselpark Arena =

Sports facility in Hamburg, Germany

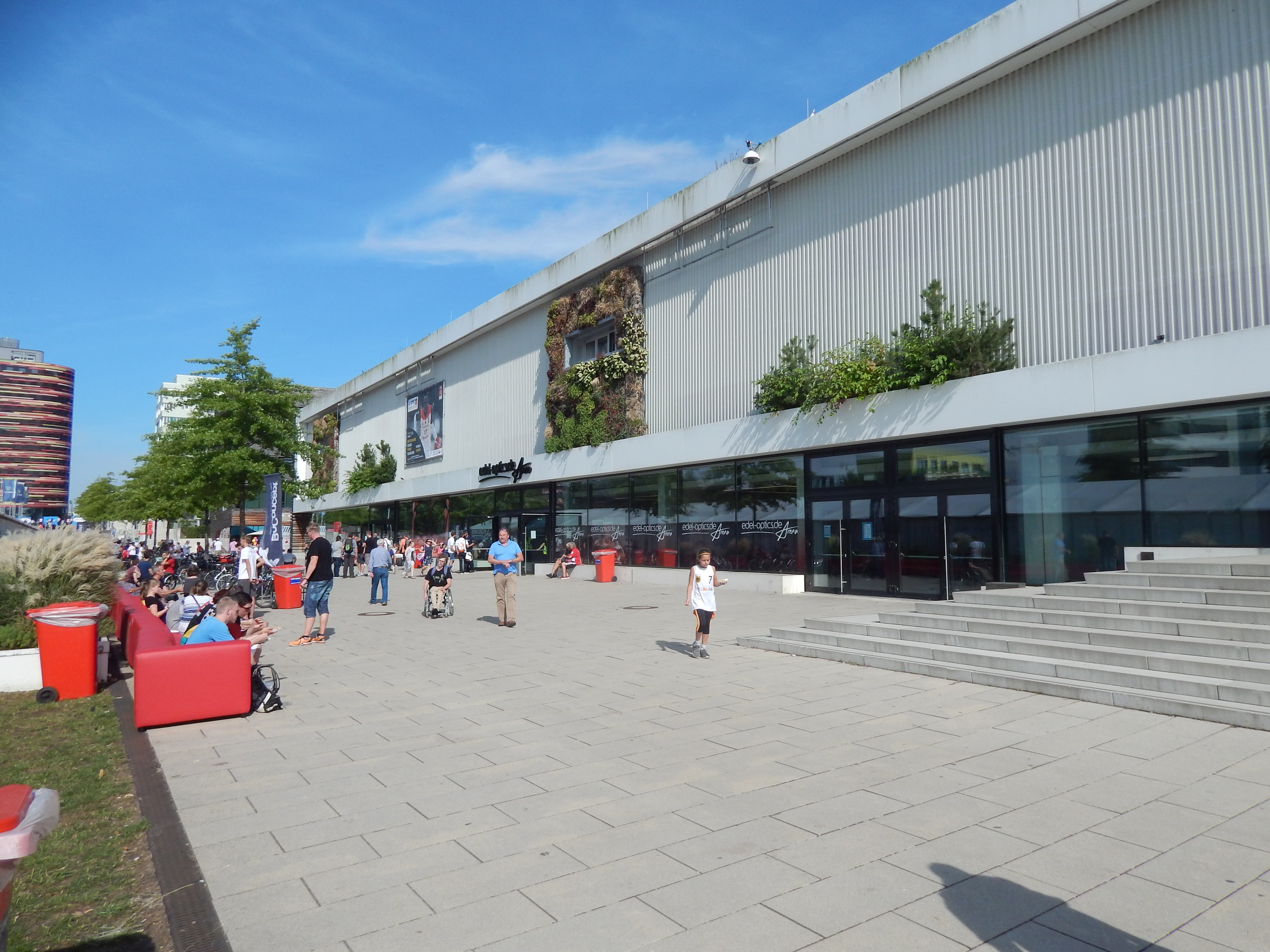
- The Edel-optics.de Arena in August 2018
- Interactive map of Inselpark Arena
- Former names: Inselparkhalle (2014 to May 2017) edel-optics.de Arena (2017–2024)
- Address: Kurt-Emmerich-Platz 10–12, Hamburg, Germany
- Coordinates: 53.4956°N 10.0024°E
- Operator: InselAkademie Sport- und Schulungszentrum Wilhelmsburg GmbH
- Capacity: 3,400 seats (Basketball)
- Surface: Concrete
- Public transit: Wilhelmsburg

Construction
- Groundbreaking: October 2011 (sports hall); June 2011 (swimming pool)
- Opened: 20 October 2014 (sports hall); March 2013 (swimming pool)
- Cost: €14 million (sports hall)
- Architect: Allmann Sattler Wappner
- Builder: Benno-und-Inge-Behrens-Stiftung

The Inselpark Arena (formerly knows as Inselparkhalle and edel-optics.de Arena) is a multi-function sports facility in the Wilhelmsburg district of Hamburg with a sports hall and a swimming pool. The hall is the home venue of the first division basketball team Hamburg Towers. It is owned by the Benno and Inge Behrens Foundation, and operated by the InselAkademie Sport- und Schulungszentrum Wilhelmsburg GmbH.

== History ==
The sports hall was originally an exhibition site built for the International Garden Show 2013. Construction began in October 2011 and was completed in the spring of 2013. Work on the swimming pool began in June 2011 and was completed in May 2013. After the garden show, the hall was converted into a sports hall at a cost of €14 million, of which the Benno and Inge Behrens Foundation contributed over €6 million. €4.5 million of funding was provided from the Hamburg International Building Exhibition, and the city of Hamburg paid the remainder, a little over €3.5 million. The hall was inaugurated in late October 2014 with a Hamburg Towers match.

The sports hall was commissioned by the Benno and Inge Behrens Foundation and IBA Hamburg. The building work was carried out by bs2architekten from Hamburg. In May 2017, the Hamburg optics group Edeloptics GmbH acquired the naming rights of the arena, and the name was changed to the "edel-optics.de Arena". The contract was not extended after 31 March 2024 and the arena has been named Inselpark Arena until a new naming sponsor is found.

== In use ==
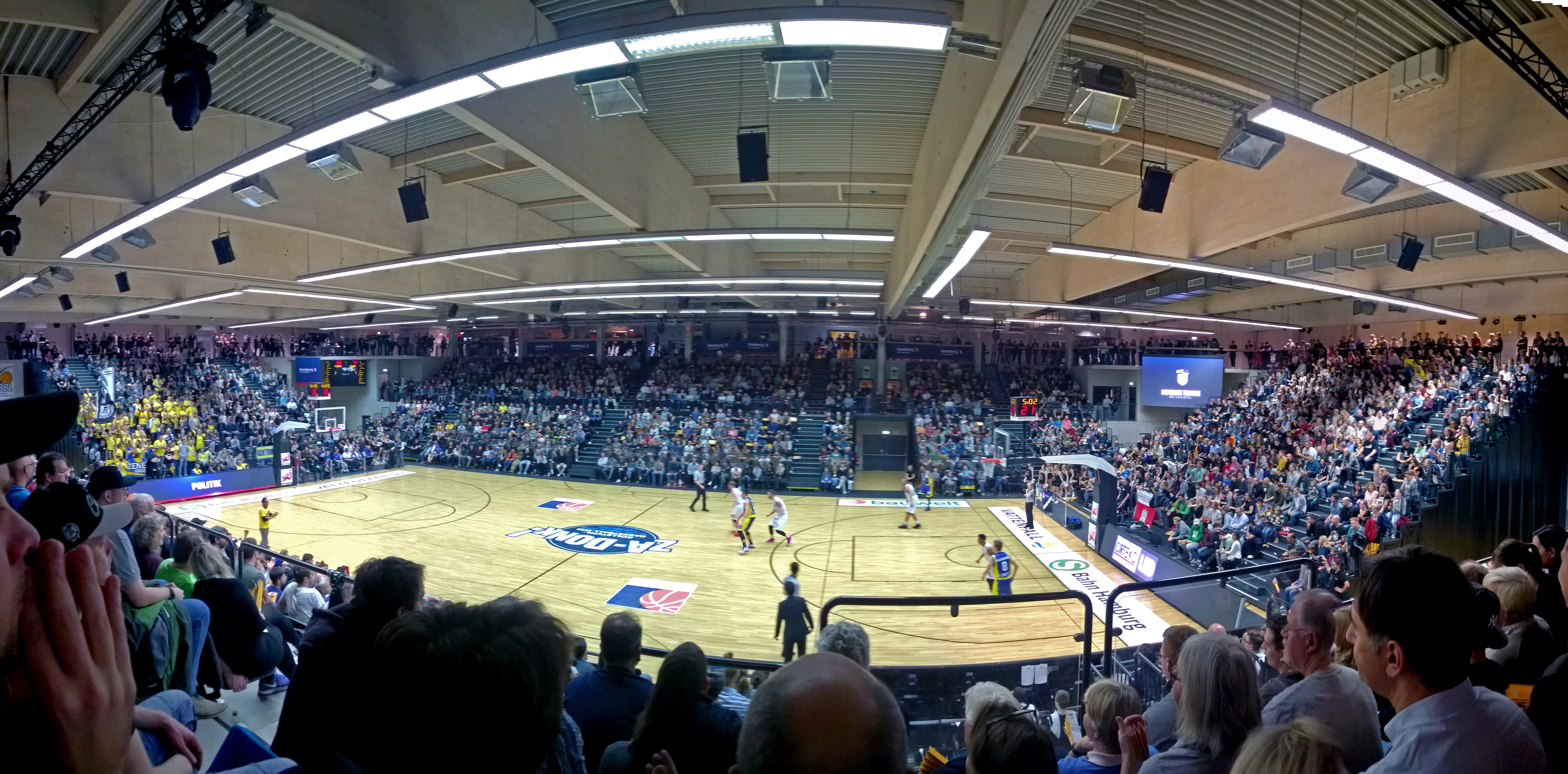
Arena during a Hamburg Towers game

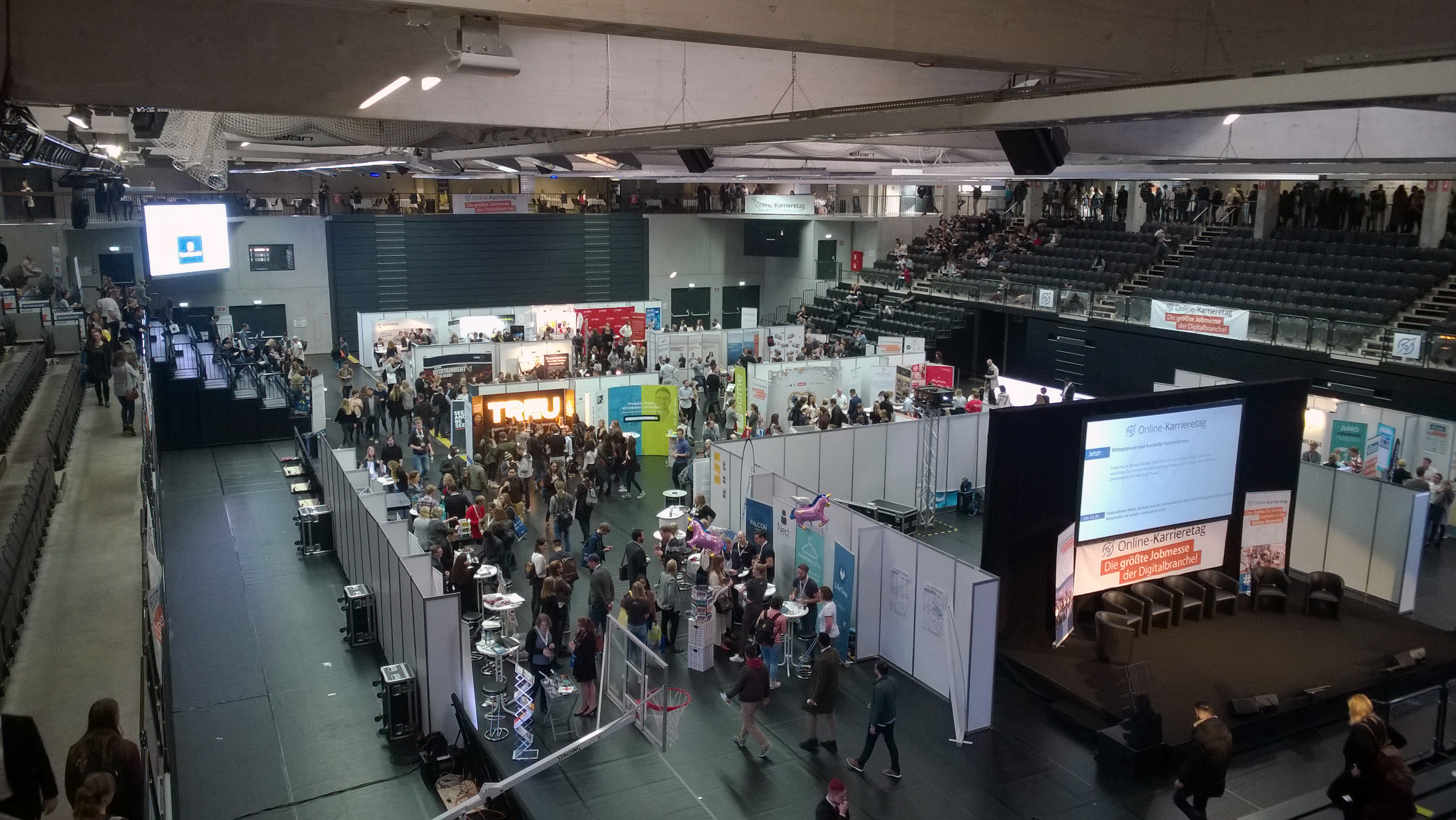
Arena during a job fair

The Inselpark Arena serves as the home venue of the Hamburg Towers professional basketball team, and the BG Baskets Hamburg wheelchair basketball team. It has a spectator capacity of 3,400 seats for basketball and 2,800 seats for wheelchair basketball. In August 2015, the basketball Supercup was played in the Inselparkhalle, featuring the national teams of Turkey, Poland, Latvia and Germany. In 2025 the arena serves as a venue of the EuroBasket Women.

In addition to basketball, in December 2015, a professional boxing event took place, including a fight between Jack Culcay-Keth and Dennis Hogan for the WBA interim championship super welterweight place. In May 2016, the Inselparkhalle was the venue of the 2016 European Darts Matchplay event. In August 2016, teams competed in the 2018 Wheelchair Basketball World Championship. On 30 October and 1 November 2016, the first official international matches of the German futsal national team took place in the hall.

In addition to sporting events, the building is also used for congresses, concerts, and conferences.
