= Agustín Alejos Alonso =

Spanish wheelchair basketball player

Agustín Alejos
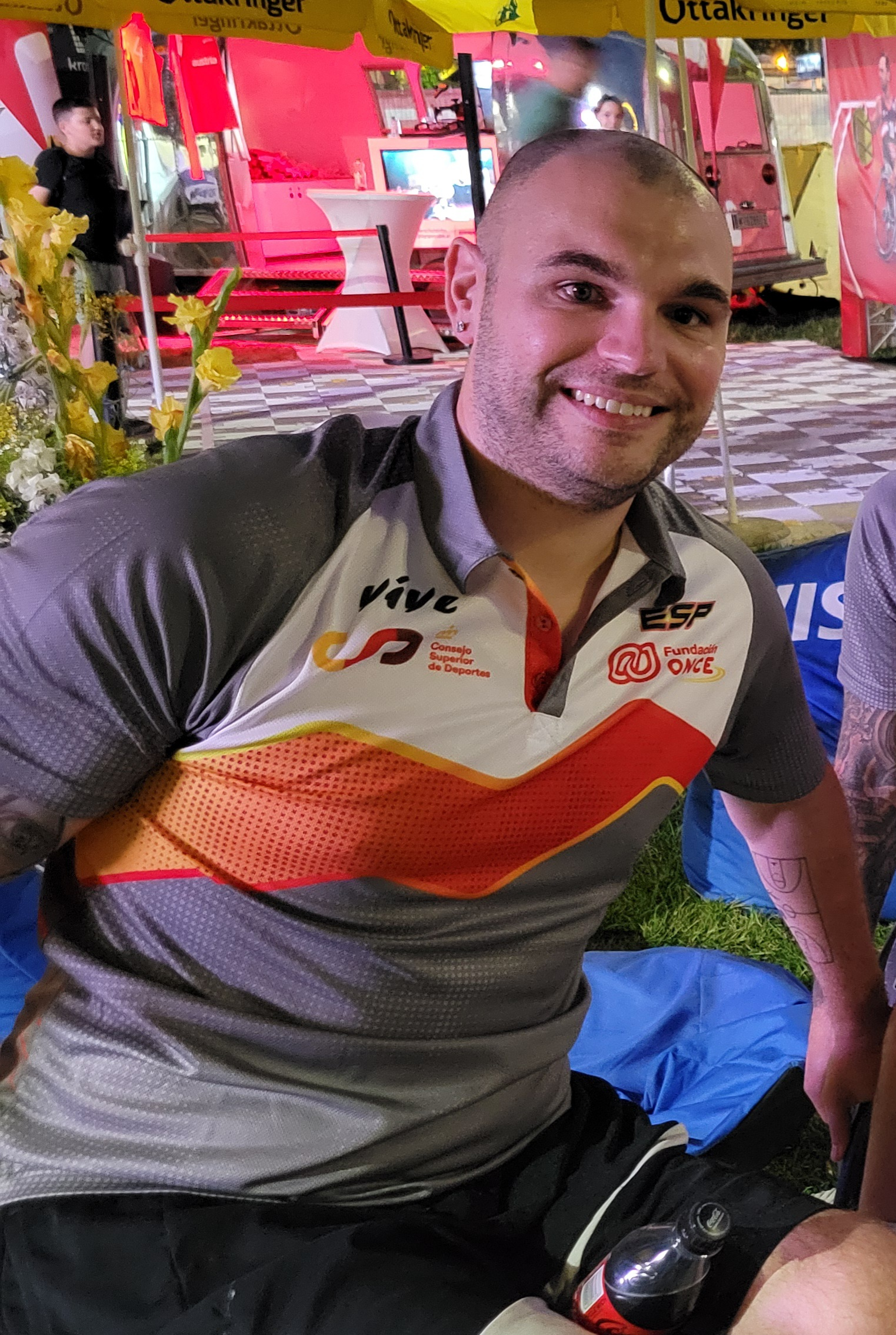
- Agustín Alejos in August 2024

Personal information
- Full name: Agustín Alejos Alonso
- Born: November 8, 1987 (age 38) Vigo, Spain

Sport
- Sport: Wheelchair basketball
- Disability class: 4.5
Medal record
Representing the Spain
Men's wheelchair basketball
Paralympic Games
Silver medal – second place	2016 Rio de Janeiro	Team

Agustín Alejos Alonso (born November 8, 1987) is a Spanish wheelchair basketball player and a member of the Spain men's national wheelchair basketball team.

== Career ==
Alejos was invited to try wheelchair basketball around 2002 by a neighbour, who was the president of the team in Vigo. He joined a professional team in Murcia and played for two seasons before heading to a team in Toledo for another two seasons. He returned to Vigo before heading to Padova Millennium Basket in Italy for two seasons. He moved to Australia for family reason in 2010 and played for the Queensland Spinning Bullets in the Australian wheelchair basketball league from 2010 to 2015, with the exception of the 2012 season. With the goal towards 2016 Rio Paralympics, he returned to Europe and split his season between playing for Gran Canaria and Vigo.

Alejos was part of the Spanish team in 2016 Summer Paralympics, winning a silver medal in the competition. He represented Spain in the 2018 Wheelchair Basketball World Championship, finishing in fifth place. He competed in the 2020 Summer Paralympics, with Spain finishing in fourth place.
