= Simon Brown (basketball) =

British wheelchair basketball player (born 1986)

Personal information
- Born: 3 June 1986 (age 40)

Sport
- Sport: Wheelchair basketball
- Disability class: 2.0
Medal record
Men's wheelchair basketball
Representing Great Britain
Paralympic Games
| Silver medal – second place | 2024 Paris | Team |
| Bronze medal – third place | 2008 Beijing | Team |
| Bronze medal – third place | 2016 Rio | Team |
World Championship
| Gold medal – first place | 2018 Hamburg | Team |
| Silver medal – second place | 2022 Dubai | Team |
| Bronze medal – third place | 2026 Ottawa | Team |

Simon Brown (born 3 June 1986) is a British wheelchair basketball player and a member of British men's national wheelchair basketball team.

== Career ==
Brown made his Summer Paralympic Games debut for Great Britain at the 2008 Summer Paralympics and won a bronze medal in wheelchair basketball. After missing the 2012 Summer Paralympics, he returned for the 2016 Summer Paralympics and again won a bronze medal.

He competed at the 2018 Wheelchair Basketball World Championship and helped Great Britain win their first gold medal in Wheelchair Basketball World Championship history. He competed at the 2022 Wheelchair Basketball World Championships, which was delayed until June 2023, and won a silver medal.

He again represented Great Britain at the 2024 Summer Paralympics and won a silver medal in wheelchair basketball. In September 2026, he competed at the 2026 Wheelchair Basketball World Championships and won a bronze medal.
