= Jannik Blair =

Australian wheelchair basketball player

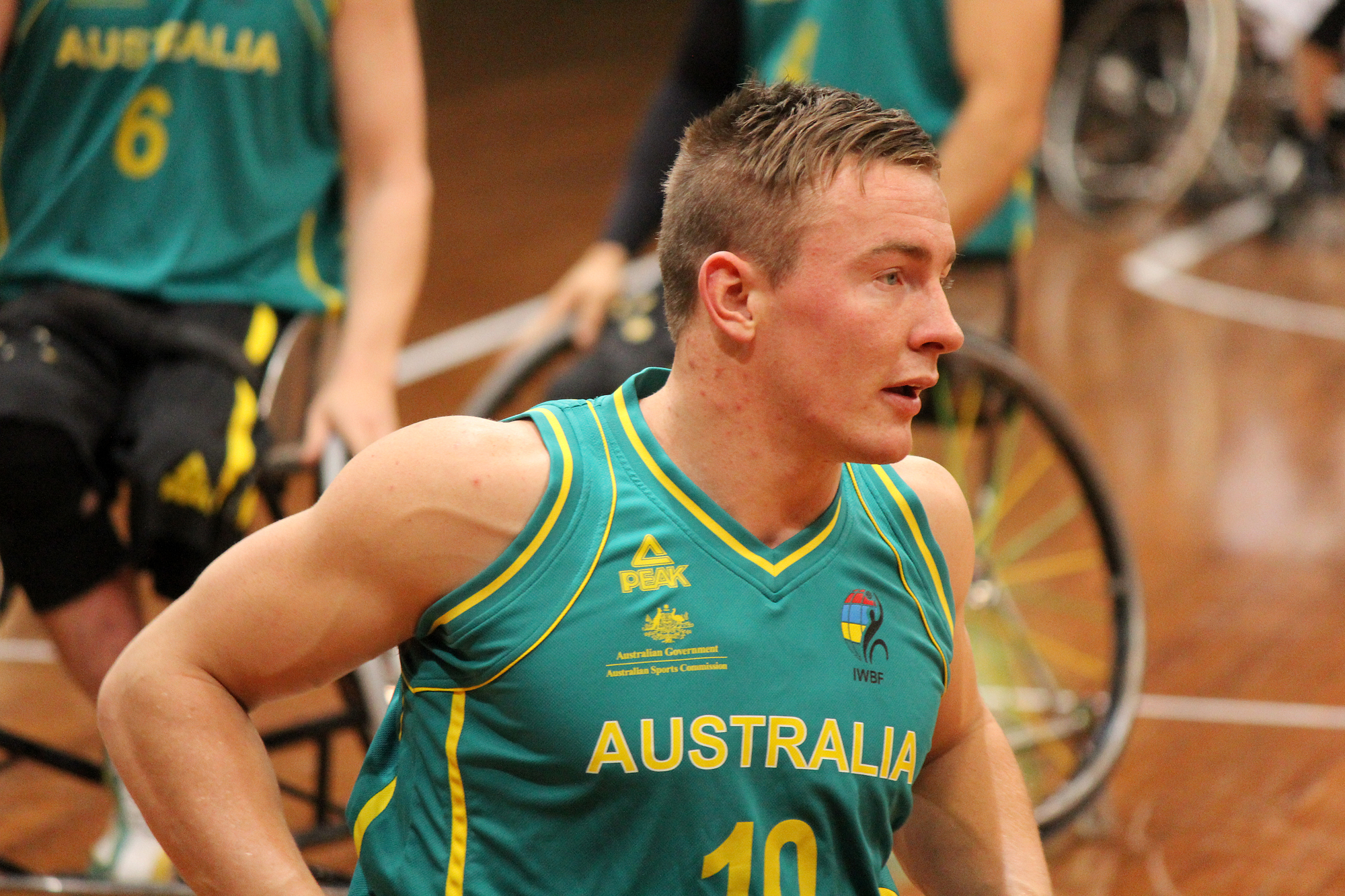
- Blair warming up before a game in Sydney

Personal information
- Nationality: Australia
- Born: 3 February 1992 (age 34) Horsham, Victoria

Sport
- Country: Australia
- Sport: Wheelchair basketball
- College team: The University of Alabama

Achievements and titles
- National finals
Medal record
Wheelchair basketball
Paralympic Games
Silver medal – second place	2012 London	Men's wheelchair basketball
World Championships
Gold medal – first place	2014 Incheon	Team
Bronze medal – third place	2018 Hamburg	Team

Jannik Blair (born 3 February 1992) is a 1 point wheelchair basketball player who has played for the University of Missouri and the National Wheelchair Basketball League Dandenong Rangers. He is a member of the Australia men's national wheelchair basketball team, making his debut in 2009, and was member of the Australian team that won the silver medal at the 2012 Summer Paralympics in wheelchair basketball. He was a member of the Rollers at the 2024 Summer Paralympics, his fourth Games.

== Early life ==
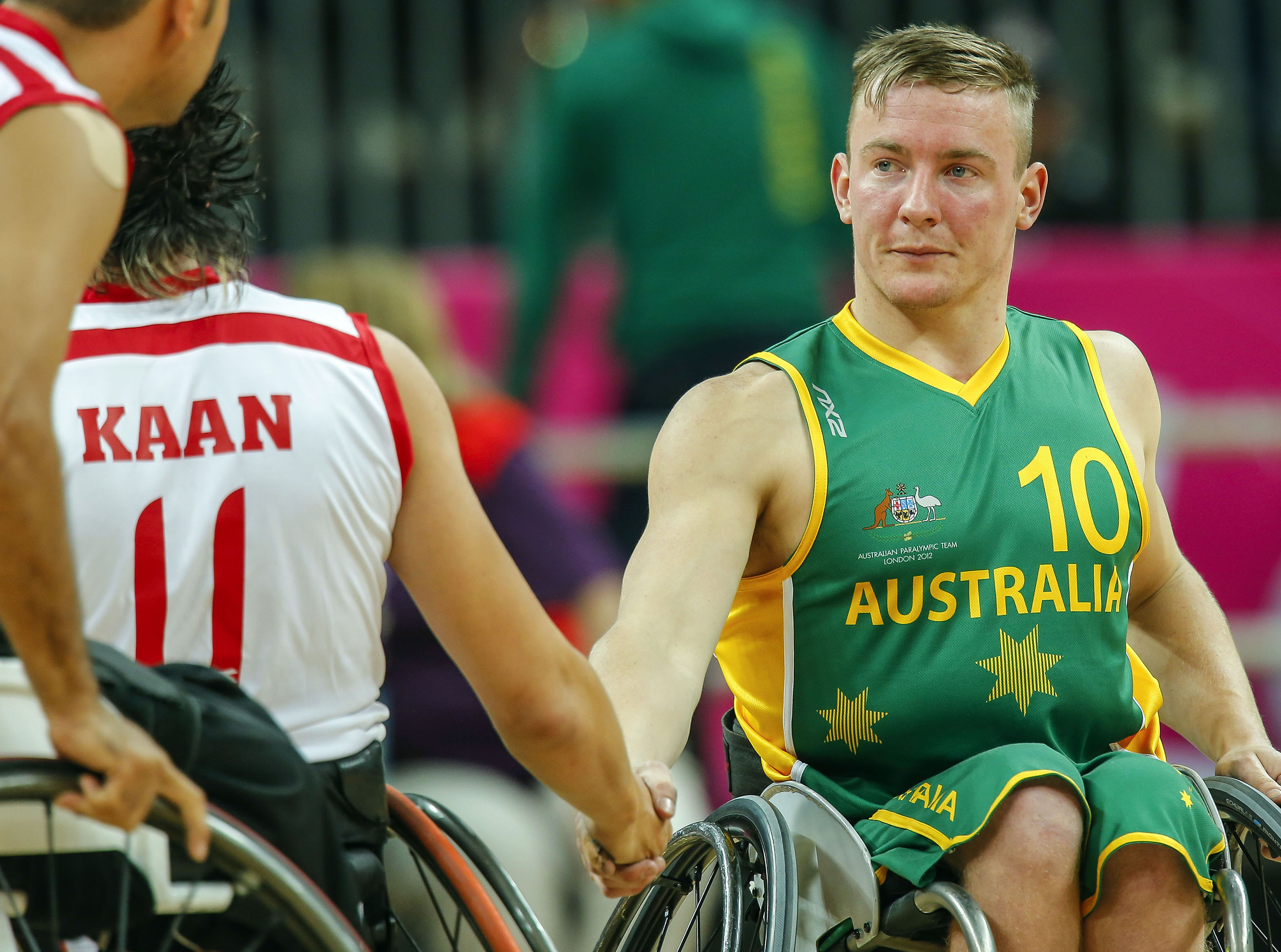
Blair at the 2012 London Paralympics

Blair was born on 3 February 1992 in Horsham, Victoria. In 2004 at the age of the twelve, he broke his back, wrist and suffered a collapsed lung after an accident on a utility vehicle. He went into a coma for a week. As of 2012 he lives in Horsham in Victoria. By 2005, he was playing a variety of sports including wheelchair basketball, track racing and hand-cycling. As of 2012, he attended the University of Missouri on partial scholarship for wheelchair basketball, but was taking time off to concentrate on basketball.

== Wheelchair basketball ==
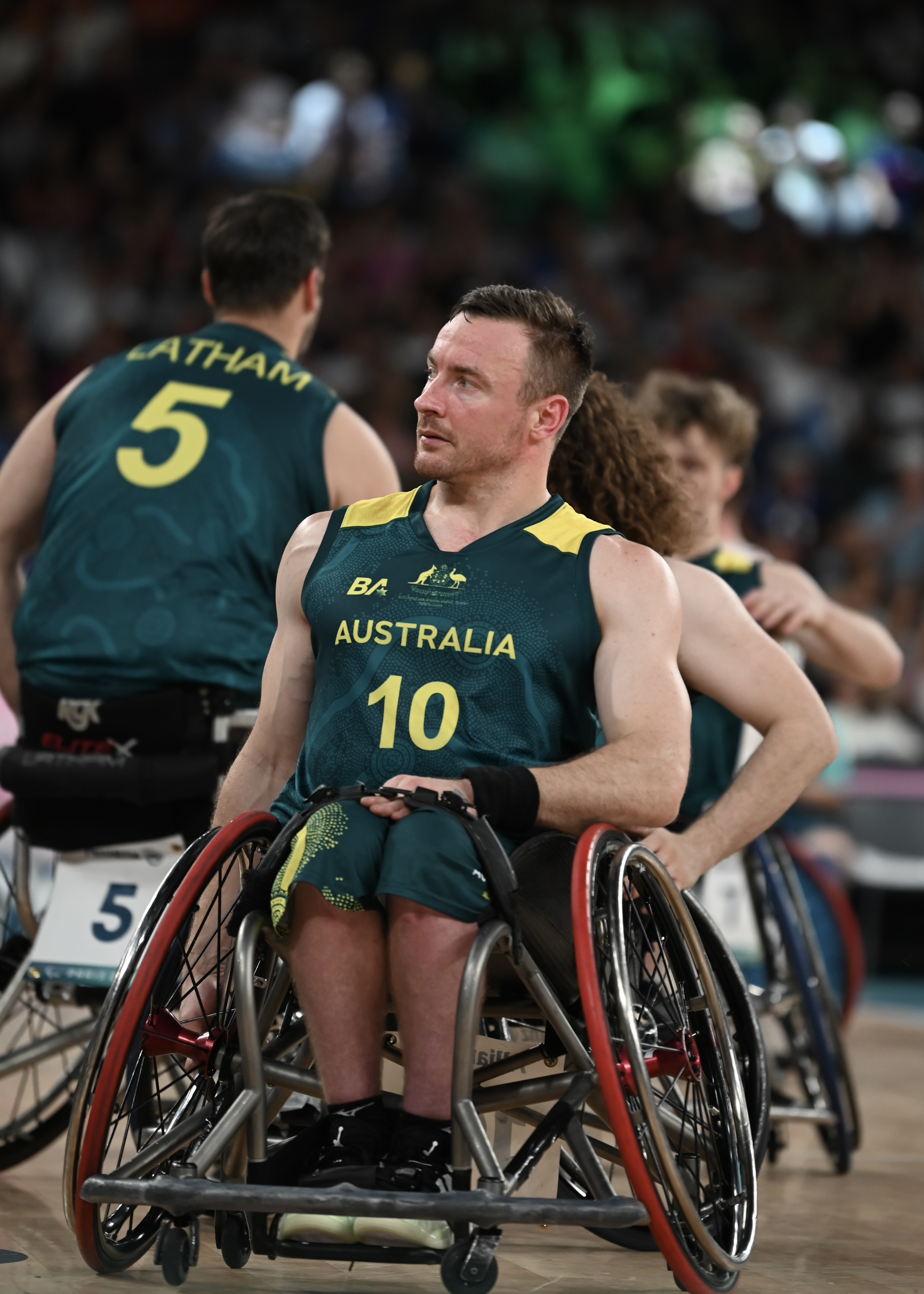
Blair at the 2024 Paris Paralympics

Blair is a 1 point wheelchair basketball player. As of 2012, he has a scholarship with the Victorian Institute of Sport.

Blair first played wheelchair basketball in 2005, and attended a Ballarat, Victoria hosted APC Paralympic Talent Search in 2006. At the event, they encouraged him to continue in the sport.

Blair played in the National Wheelchair Basketball League (NWBL) in 2009, finishing the season by being named to the All-Star 5. As of 2012, he plays for the Dandenong Rangers in the NWBL, and joined for and was playing for University of Missouri team in the United States National Wheelchair Basketball Association (NWBA) as of 2012. In late 2012, Blair was presented with offers several offers from American universities, including the University of Missouri, Columbia, and the University of Alabama, Tuscaloosa. After much consideration, Blair chose to take up a scholarship from the University of Alabama. He will dress for them in the Spring season of 2013.

Blair made his national team debut in 2009 at the Asia Oceania Wheelchair Basketball Championships where he averaged 0.3 points per game. Later that year, he competed in the Rollers World Challenge, and the IWBF U23 World Championship where his team finished fourth. At the 2011 Wheelchair Tri Series where he played in games against South Africa and the Netherlands, he averaged 0.8 points per game. In August of that year, he also competed in the International Tournament of Champions. In October 2011, he participated in a national team training camp in Canberra. He was selected to represent Australia at the 2012 Summer Paralympics in wheelchair basketball. The Games were his first. Going into the London Paralympics, his team was ranked number one in the world. He had to earn his spot as fourteen men had been vying for spots on the team.

At the 2012 Summer Paralympics he was part of the Australian men's wheelchair team that won silver. He was a member of the Rollers team that won the gold medal at the 2014 Wheelchair Basketball World Championships. In 2016, he was selected for the 2016 Summer Paralympics in Rio de Janeiro, where his team, the Rollers, finished sixth.

In 2018, he was a member of the Rollers that won the bronze medal at 2018 Wheelchair Basketball World Championship in Hamburg, Germany. At the 2020 Tokyo Paralympics, the Rollers finished fifth with a win–loss record of 4–4. At the 2024 Paris Paralympics, he was a member of the Rollers that finished fifth with a win/loss record of 3-3.
