= Virginia Pérez =

Cuban basketball player

Personal information
- Nationality: Cuban
- Born: 23 November 1957 (age 67)

Sport
- Sport: Basketball

Virginia Pérez (born 23 November 1957) is a Cuban basketball player. She competed in the women's tournament at the 1980 Summer Olympics.
