= Marina Mohnen =

German wheelchair basketball player (born 1978)

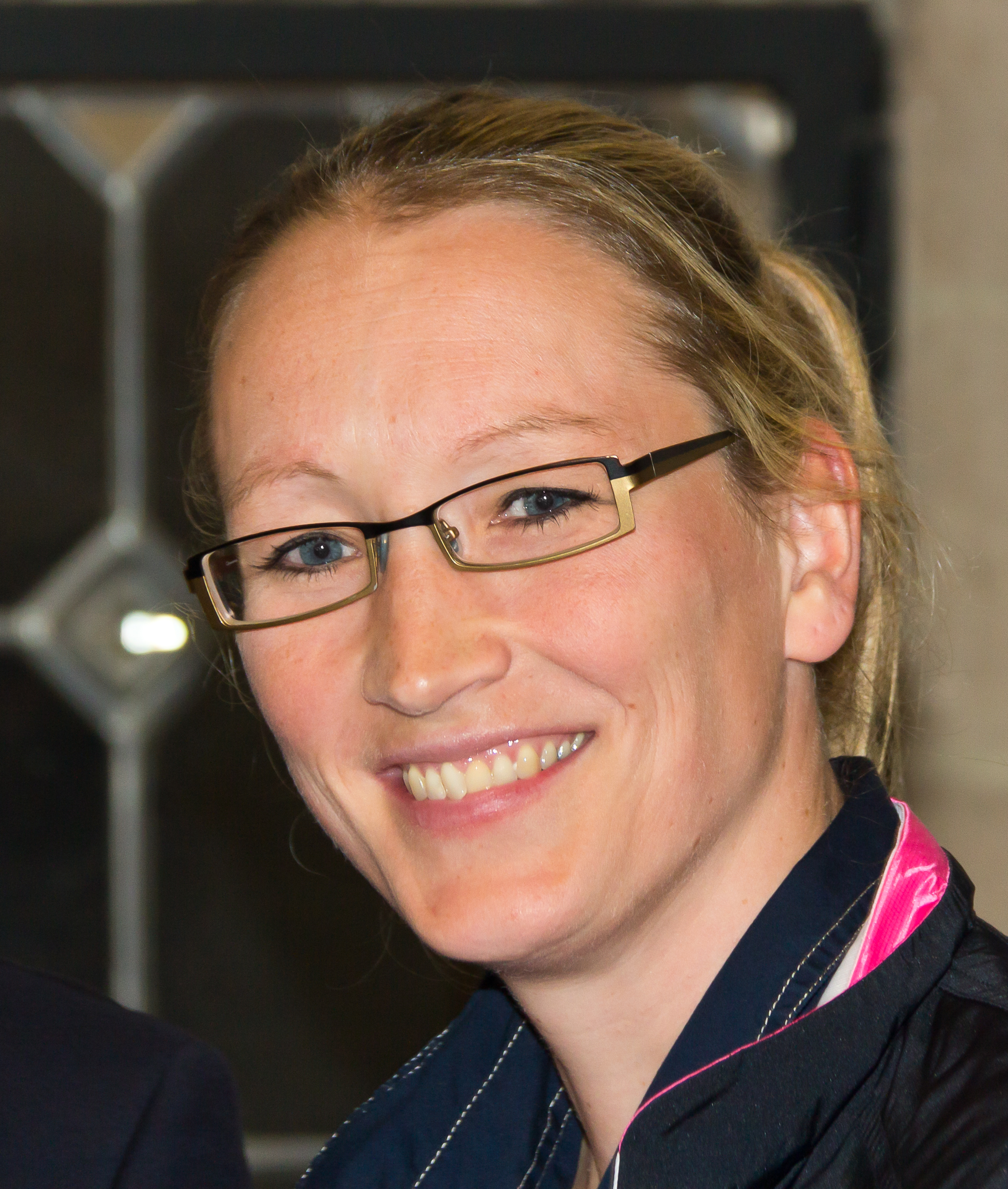
- Marina Mohnen in 2012

Personal information
- Born: 31 October 1978 (age 47)
- Height: 178 cm (70 in)

Sport
- Country: Germany
- Sport: Wheelchair basketball
- Disability class: 4.5
- Event: Women's team
- Club: RSC Köln; S. Stefano Sport
- Coached by: Holger Glinicki

Achievements and titles
- Paralympic finals: 2008 Paralympics, 2012 Paralympics, 2016 Paralympics
Medal record
Women's wheelchair basketball
Representing Germany
Paralympic Games
Gold medal – first place	2012 London	Team competition
Silver medal – second place	2008 Beijing	Team competition
Silver medal – second place	2016 Rio de Janeiro	Team competition
World Championship
Bronze medal – third place	2006 Amsterdam	Team competition
Silver medal – second place	2010 Birmingham	Team competition
Silver medal – second place	2014 Toronto	Team competition
Bronze medal – third place	2018 Hamburg	Team competition

Marina Mohnen (born 31 October 1978) is a 4.5-point wheelchair basketball player, who plays for Rhine River Rhinos Wiesbaden in Germany, and previously played for the Mainhatten Skywheelers, RBC Köln 99ers, BAD.S. Quartu Sant' Elena und S. Stefano Sport. She also played with the German national team that won the European title in 2005, 2007, 2009, 2011 and 2015 and was runner-up in 2013. It was also runner-up at the IWBF World Championship in Birmingham in 2010 and in Toronto 2014. She won a silver medal at the 2008 Summer Paralympics in Beijing and the 2016 Summer Paralympics in Rio, and a gold medal at the 2012 Summer Paralympics in London. The team was voted 2008 Team of the Year in disabled sports, and President Horst Köhler presented it with Germany's highest sports award, the Silbernes Lorbeerblatt (Silver Laurel Leaf). President Joachim Gauck awarded the team a second Silver Leaf after it won the gold medal at the 2012 Summer Paralympics and at the Summer Paralympics in 2016.

== Biography ==
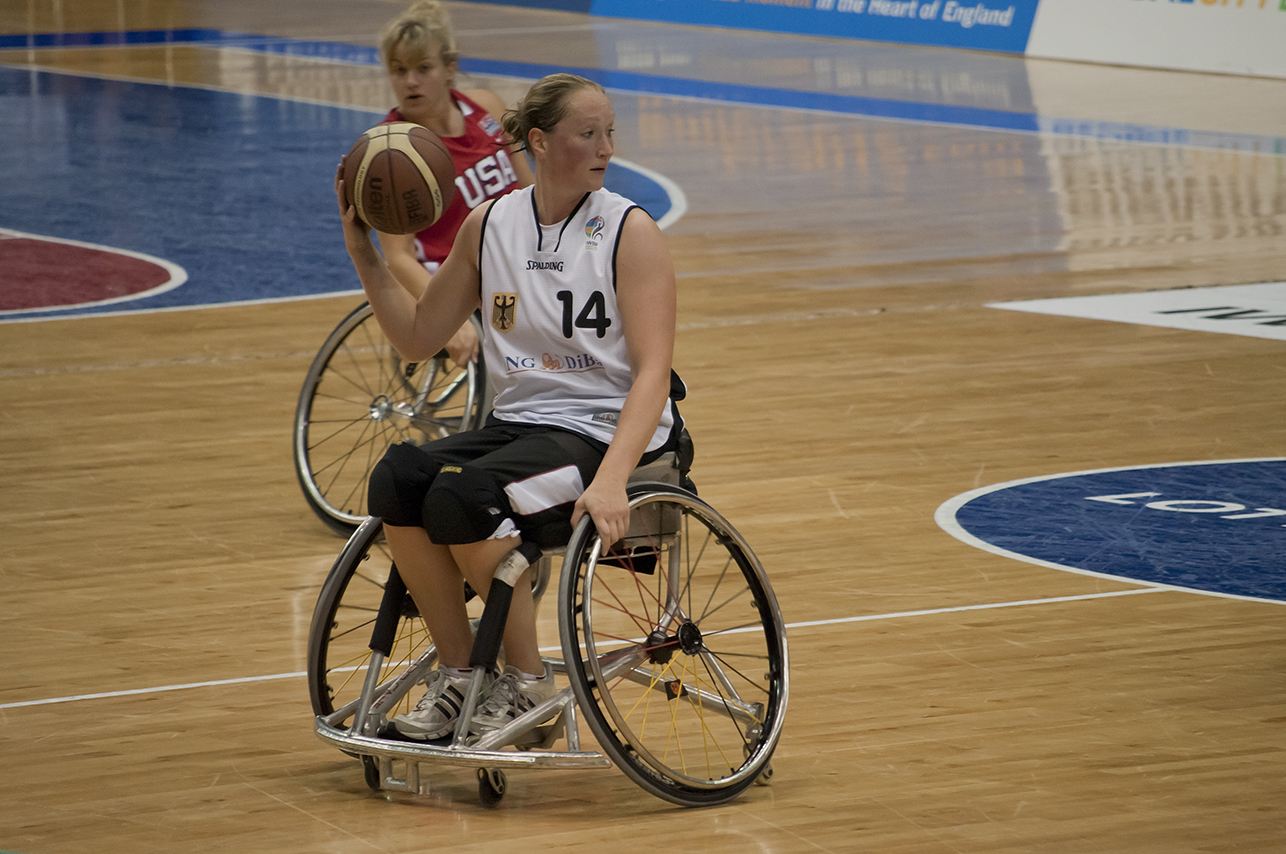
Marina Mohnen in Birmingham in July 2010

Marina Mohnen was born in Bitburg on 31 October 1978. Mohnen majored in economics (business education).

Mohnen began playing basketball when she was eleven, but in 1999 she had a severe anterior cruciate ligament injury. She took up wheelchair basketball as a 4.5-point player, initially playing for her home town team in Bitburg, but she subsequently moved to Koblenz, then to Bonn, and then to Cologne, where she now lives again after a stint in Italy. As part of RSC Köln from 2004 to 2009, she played an important role in the rise of the team. She then moved to the Italian club S. Stefano Sport in Santo Stefano, playing in Italy from 2009 to 2011, after which she returned to RBC Köln.

Mohnen joined the German national team in 2005. They went on to win European Championships in 2005, 2007, 2009 and 2011. They were bronze medallists at the World Championships in Amsterdam in 2006, and silver medallists at the World Championships in Birmingham in 2010.

In September 2008, Mohnen participated in the 2008 Summer Paralympics in Beijing, her first, but the German team was beaten in the gold medal game by the United States, and took home Paralympic silver medals. After the Paralympics, the team's performance was considered impressive enough for it to be named the national "Team of the Year", and it received the Silver Laurel Leaf, Germany's highest sporting honour, from German President Horst Koehler. Mohnen beat Olympic gold medallists Britta Heidemann, Marion Rodewald and Oksana Chusovitina, and long-distance runner Sabrina Mockenhaupt, to take the title of Cologne's Sportswoman of the Year for 2008.

Mohnen was part of the team that won the European Championship for the sixth time in a row in Nazareth in 2011, thereby qualifying for the 2012 Summer Paralympic Games in London. As part of the team's preparation, they toured the United States and Australia. Mohnen was captain of the team in London. In the gold medal match in London, the team faced the Australia women's national wheelchair basketball team, who had defeated them 48–46 in Sydney just a few months earlier, in front of a capacity crowd of over 12,000 at the North Greenwich Arena, that included Mohnen's mother Kati and sister Sonja. The German team had been undefeated up to that point, but had started slowly in its games against the United States and China, winning both games by six-point margins, and seemed to play their best basketball only in the final minutes of a game. They defeated the Australians 44–58 to win the gold medal, the first that Germany had won in women's wheelchair basketball since 1984, a 28-year period. Mohnen contributed eleven points. They were awarded the Silver Laurel Leaf by President Joachim Gauck in November 2012, and were named Team of the Year for 2012. Bitburg honoured Mohnen by entering her name into the Golden Book of the city.

In July 2013, the team lost the European Championship to the Netherlands before a home crowd of 2,300 in Frankfurt by a point, 56–57. The German team claimed silver at the 2014 Women's World Wheelchair Basketball Championship in Toronto, Ontario, Canada, and beat the Netherlands in the 2015 European Championships, to claim its tenth European title. At the 2016 Paralympic Games, it won silver after losing the final to the United States.

== Achievements ==
- 2005: Gold at European Championships (Villeneuve d'Ascq, France)
- 2006: Bronze at World Championships (Amsterdam, Netherlands)
- 2007: Gold at European Championships (Wetzlar, Germany)
- 2008: Silver at Paralympics (Beijing, China)
- 2009: Gold at European Championships (Stoke Mandeville, England)
- 2010: Silver at World Championships (Birmingham, Great Britain)
- 2011: Gold at European Championships (Nazareth, Israel)
- 2012: Gold at Paralympic Games (London, England)
- 2013: Silver at European Championships (Frankfurt, Germany)
- 2014: Silver at the World Championships (Toronto, Ontario, Canada)
- 2015: Gold at the European Championships (Worcester, England)
- 2016: Silver at the Paralympic Games (Rio de Janeiro, Brazil)

== Awards ==
- 2008: Team of the Year
- 2008: Silver Laurel Leaf
- 2008: Cologne's Sportswoman of the Year
- 2012: Team of the Year
- 2012: Silver Laurel Leaf
- 2012: Golden Book of the City of Bitburg.
- 2015: Gold at the European Championships (Worcester, England)
