= 2018 Wheelchair Basketball World Championship =

- Venue: Edel-optics.de Arena
- Location: Hamburg, Germany
- Start date: 16 August
- End date: 26 August
- Competitors: 16 teams (men); 12 teams (women) from 19 nations

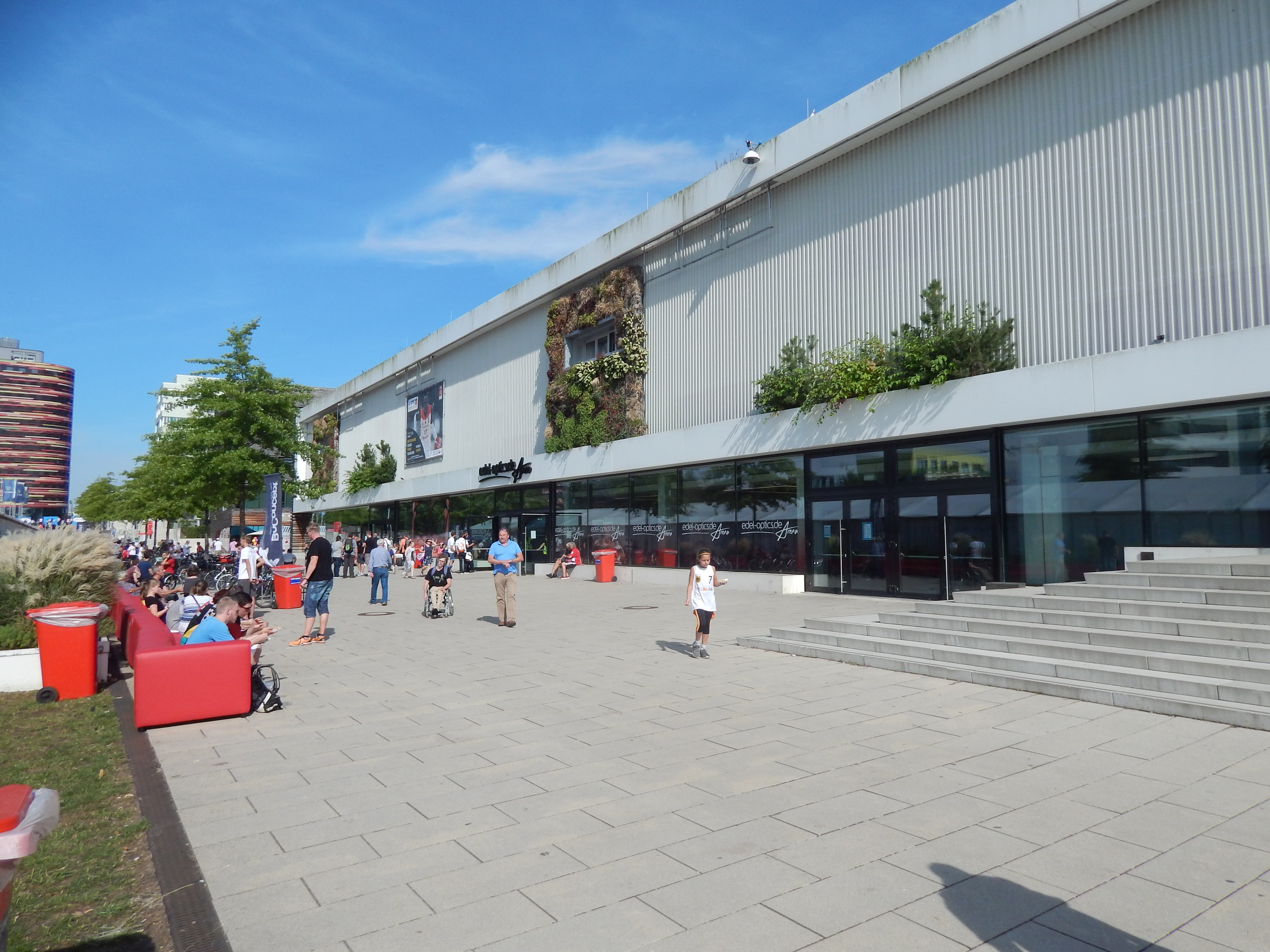
The Edel-optics.de Arena in August 2018

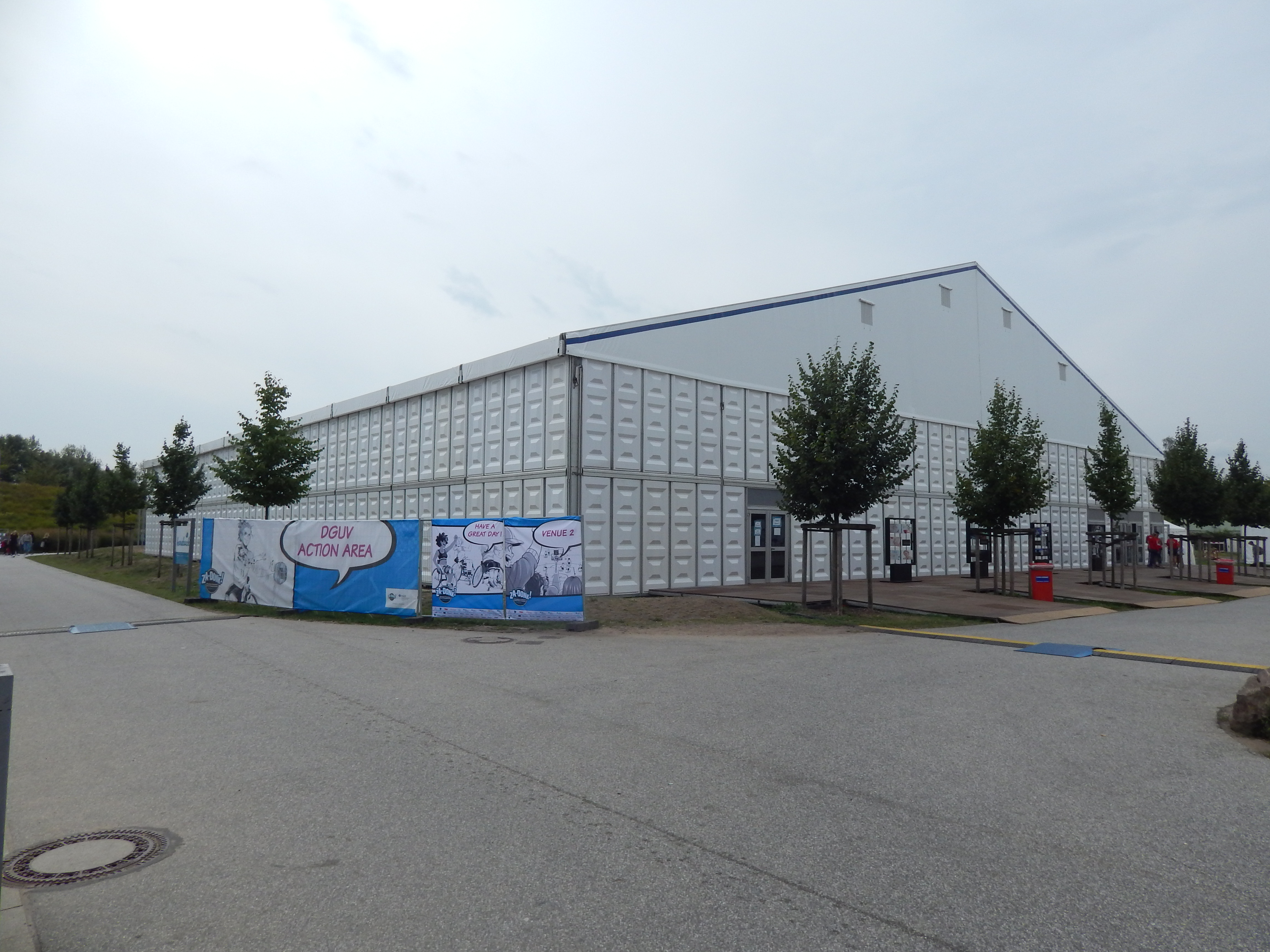
Temporary Venue 2

The 2018 Wheelchair Basketball World Championship was held at the Edel-optics.de Arena in Hamburg, Germany, from 16 to 26 August 2018. Both men's and women's tournaments were held, with 12 women's and 16 men's teams competing, representing 19 different nations. Each team selected 12 players for the tournament. The men's competition was won by Great Britain, with the United States winning silver and Australia winning bronze. The women's competition was won by the Netherlands, with Great Britain winning silver and the host nation winning bronze.

== Medallists ==
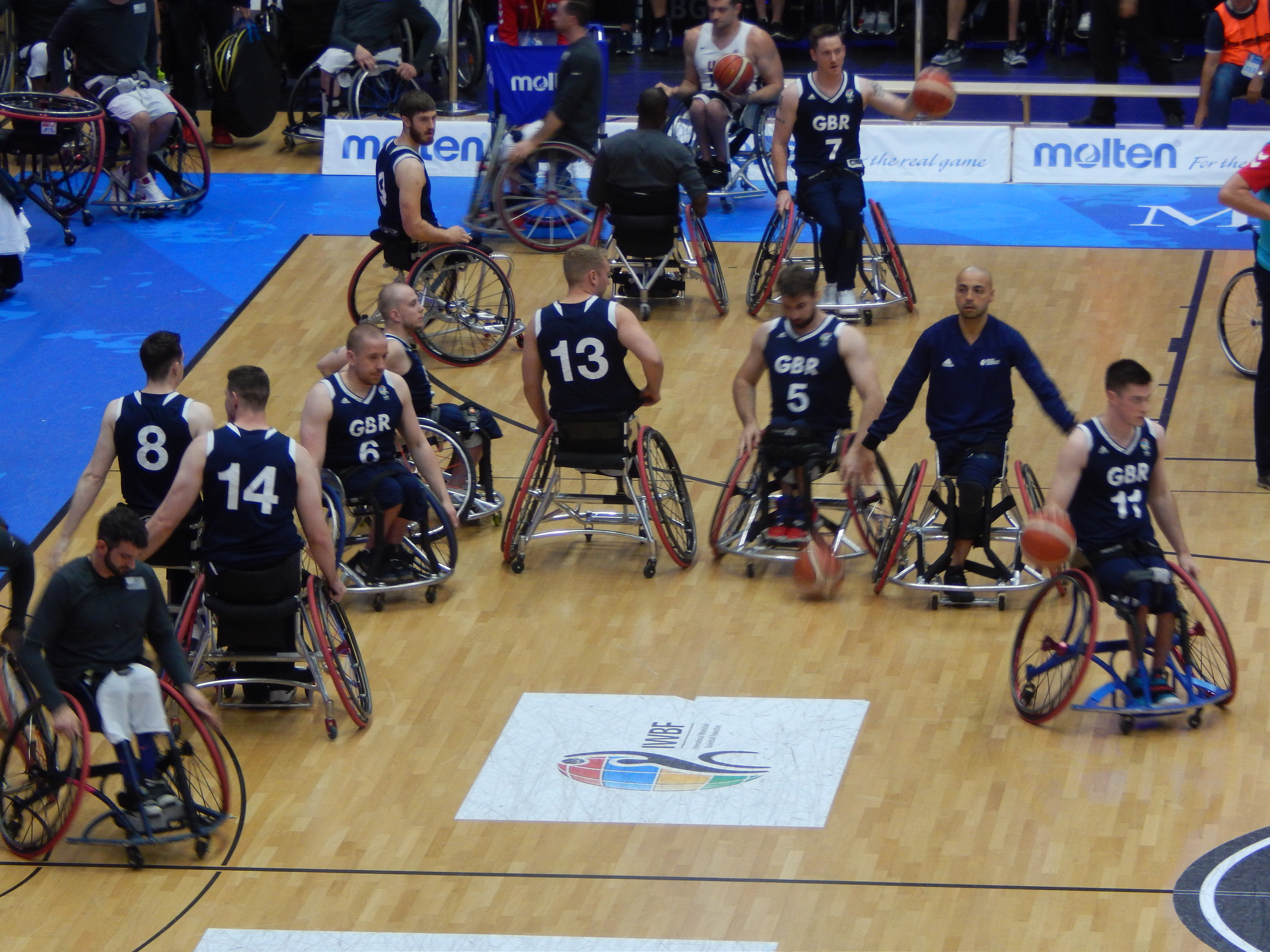
Team Great Britain

Event	Gold	Silver	Bronze
Men's team	Great Britain	United States	Australia
Women's team	Netherlands	Great Britain	Germany

This was the best ever performance at a wheelchair basketball world championship by both the British men's and women's teams. The former had never won an official championship before (they had claimed the 1973 unofficial title), and the latter had never made the finals.

== Squads ==
Each of the 16 men's and 12 women's teams (from 19 different nations) selected a squad of 12 players for the tournament. Athletes are given an eight-level-score specific to wheelchair basketball, ranging from 0.5 to 4.5. Lower scores represent a higher degree of disability. The sum score of all players on the court cannot exceed 14.

== Men ==
=== Preliminary round ===
==== Pool A ====
Team	Pld	W	L	PF	PA	PD	Pts.
Iran	3	3	0	227	180	+47	6
Canada	3	2	1	226	191	+35	5
Germany	3	1	2	208	185	+23	4
Morocco	3	0	3	133	238	-105	3

16 August 2018
17:45

Statistics

Germany	84–40	Morocco
Scoring by quarter: 22-6, 21-10, 20-11, 21-13
Scoring by half: 43-16, 41-24
Pts: T. Böhme, 22; Rebs: K. Möller, 11; Asts: N. Dreimüller, 7		Pts: Z. Challat, 12; Rebs: R. Maataoui, 7 Asts: Z. Challat, 6

Edel-optics.de Arena
Venue 1

17 August 2018
11:45

Statistics

Morocco	47–77	Canada
Scoring by quarter: 8-21, 10-20, 14-26, 15-10
Scoring by half: 18-41, 29-36
Pts: Z. Challat, 13; Rebs: K. Megrini, 11; Asts: Z. Challat, 4		Pts: Anderson, 26; Rebs: Anderson, 10; Asts: Anderson, 7

Edel-optics.de Arena
Venue 1

18 August 2018
18:30

Statistics

Germany	63–67	Iran
Scoring by quarter: 19-23, 11-15, 15-15, 18-14
Scoring by half: 30-38, 33-29
Pts: T. Bohme, 14; Rebs: J. Gans, 15; Asts: A. Halouski, 6		Pts: O. Hadiazhar, 24; Rebs: M. Sayari, 7 Asts: E. Ebrahimi, 6

Edel-optics.de Arena
Venue 1

19 August 2018
12:15

Statistics

Iran	77–46	Morocco
Scoring by quarter: 24-6, 21-12, 12-14, 20-14
Scoring by half: 45-18, 32-28
Pts: O. Hadiazhar, 13; Rebs: M. Sayari, 8 Asts: M. Sayari, 7		Pts: K. Megrini, 14; Rebs: K. Megrini, 9 Asts: M. Oulini, 4

Edel-optics.de Arena
Venue 2

19 August 2018
18:00

Statistics

Germany	61–78	Canada
Scoring by quarter: 14-13, 17-24, 14-19, 16-22
Scoring by half: 31-37, 30-41
Pts: A. Halouski, 12; Rebs: A. Halouski, 11; Asts: T. Bohme, 6		Pts: N. Goncin, 26; Rebs: Anderson, 15; Asts: Anderson, 10

Edel-optics.de Arena
Venue 1

20 August 2018
12:15

Statistics

Canada	71–83	Iran
Scoring by quarter: 10-29, 27-15, 16-15, 18-24
Scoring by half: 37-44, 34-39
Pts: Anderson, 34; Rebs: Anderson, 13; Asts: Anderson, Eng, 5		Pts: O. Hadiazhar, 26; Rebs: M. Abedi, 8 Asts: O. Hadiazhar, 9

Edel-optics.de Arena
Venue 2

==== Pool B ====
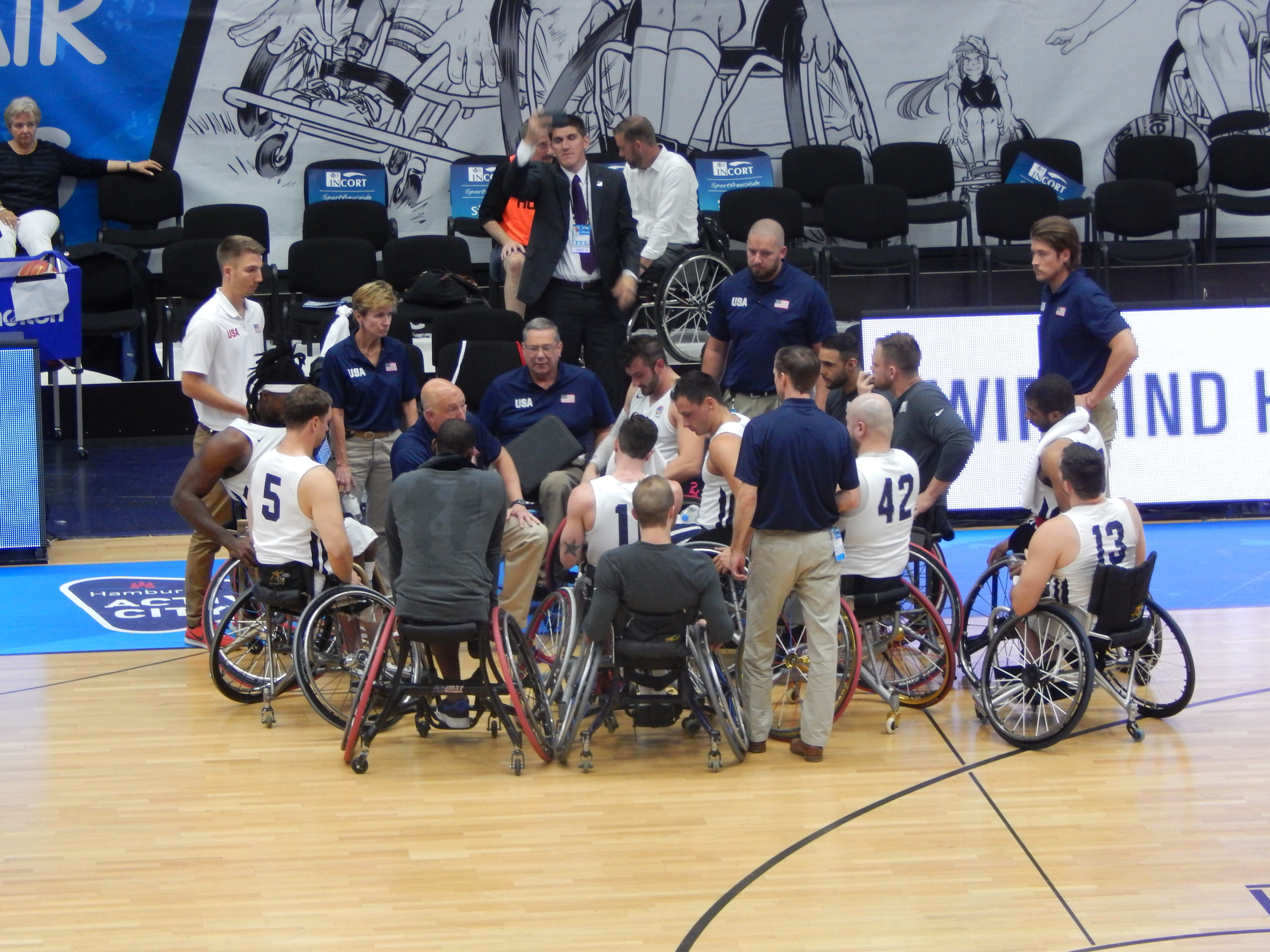
Team USA

Team	Pld	W	L	PF	PA	PD	Pts.
United States	3	3	0	223	159	+64	6
Great Britain	3	2	1	214	170	+44	5
Poland	3	1	2	151	213	-62	4
South Korea	3	0	3	160	206	-46	3

17 August 2018
19:45

Statistics

South Korea	58–77	Great Britain
Scoring by quarter: 6-31, 24-17, 3-16, 25-13
Scoring by half: 30-48, 28-29
Pts: D. Gim, 21; Rebs: D. Yang, 7 Asts: S. Cho, 4		Pts: Warburton, Manning, 18; Rebs: L. Manning, 9 Asts: P. Pratt, 9

Edel-optics.de Arena
Venue 2

18 August 2018
9:30

Statistics

United States	82–51	Poland
Scoring by quarter: 22-8, 23-10, 21-15, 16-18
Scoring by half: 45-18, 37-33
Pts: J. Williams, 14; Rebs: T. Jenifer, 6 Asts: S. Serio, 7		Pts: P. Łuszyński, 18; Rebs: M. Filipski, 7 Asts: M. Filipski, 8

Edel-optics.de Arena
Venue 1

19 August 2018
9:30

Statistics

Poland	54–53	South Korea
Scoring by quarter: 18-14, 16-6, 10-14, 10-19
Scoring by half: 34-20, 20-33
Pts: P. Łuszyński, 12; Rebs: D. Mosler, 8 Asts: M. Filipski, 8		Pts: D. Gim, 20; Rebs: D. Gim, 12; Asts: S. Cho, 7

Edel-optics.de Arena
Venue 1

19 August 2018
20:15

Statistics

United States	66–59	Great Britain
Scoring by quarter: 18-22, 13-11, 21-10, 14-16
Scoring by half: 31-33, 35-28
Pts: J. Williams, 23; Rebs: B. Bell, 8 Asts: S. Serio, 8		Pts: H. Brown, 17; Rebs: L. Manning, 14; Asts: P. Pratt, 9

Edel-optics.de Arena
Venue 1

20 August 2018
14:00

Statistics

South Korea	49–75	United States
Scoring by quarter: 12-25, 9-19, 13-11, 15-20
Scoring by half: 21-44, 28-31
Pts: D. Gim, 26; Rebs: D. Gim, 11; Asts: S. Cho, 5		Pts: J. Williams, 18; Rebs: J. Arambula, 7 Asts: J. Arambula, 8

Edel-optics.de Arena
Venue 2

20 August 2018
17:30

Statistics

Great Britain	78–46	Poland
Scoring by quarter: 18-10, 26-8, 15-16, 19-12
Scoring by half: 44-18, 34-28
Pts: G. Warburton, 28; Rebs: M. Edwards, 6 Asts: G. Choudhry, 6		Pts: Filipski, Macek, Kozaryna, 8 Rebs: K. Kozaryna, 5 Asts: M. Filipski, 6

Edel-optics.de Arena
Venue 2

==== Pool C ====
Team	Pld	W	L	PF	PA	PD	Pts.
Japan	3	2	1	186	181	+5	5
Italy	3	2	1	176	159	+17	5
Turkey	3	1	2	173	188	-15	4
Brazil	3	1	2	170	177	-7	4

17 August 2018
9:30

Statistics

Japan	58–50	Italy
Scoring by quarter: 11-18, 14-10, 19-13, 14-9
Scoring by half: 25-28, 33-22
Pts: H. Kozai, 15; Rebs: T. Miyajima, 13; Asts: Toyoshima, Miyajima, Kozai, 4		Pts: A. Giaretti, 11; Rebs: J. Geninazzi, 9 Asts: C. Spanu, 5

Edel-optics.de Arena
Venue 1

17 August 2018
20:15

Statistics

Turkey	59–52	Brazil
Scoring by quarter: 15-9, 18-10, 16-15, 10-18
Scoring by half: 33-18, 26-33
Pts: Ö. Gürbulak, 21; Rebs: Ö. Gürbulak, 9 Asts: Ö. Gürbulak, 12		Pts: G. Da Silva, M. Silva, 14; Rebs: G. Da Silva, 11; Asts: A. Viana, 4

Edel-optics.de Arena
Venue 1

18 August 2018
11:45

Statistics

Brazil	49–57	Italy
Scoring by quarter: 11-18, 12-13, 10-7, 16-19
Scoring by half: 23-31, 26-26
Pts: L. De Miranda, 14; Rebs: G. Da Silva, 9 Asts: P. Dos Santos, 4		Pts: G. Papi, 15; Rebs: G. Papi, 9 Asts: Papi, Geninazzi, 7

Edel-optics.de Arena
Venue 2

18 August 2018
20:45

Statistics

Turkey	62–67	Japan
Scoring by quarter: 14-9, 15-14, 16-22, 17-22
Scoring by half: 29-23, 33-44
Pts: Ö. Gürbulak, 21; Rebs: Ö. Gürbulak, 9 Asts: Ö. Gürbulak, 18		Pts: K. Akita, 18; Rebs: H. Kozai, 10; Asts: Kozai, Furusawa, 7

Edel-optics.de Arena
Venue 1

19 August 2018
14:00

Statistics

Italy	69–52	Turkey
Scoring by quarter: 12-16, 17-14, 21-8, 19-14
Scoring by half: 29-30, 40-22
Pts: G. Papi, 19; Rebs: G. Papi, 16; Asts: G. Papi, 8		Pts: F. Gümüş, 15; Rebs: Ö. Gürbulak, 9 Asts: Gürbulak, Sayak, 3

Edel-optics.de Arena
Venue 1

20 August 2018
10:05

Statistics

Japan	61–69	Brazil
Scoring by quarter: 12-8, 13-21, 19-18, 17-22
Scoring by half: 25-29, 36-40
Pts: H. Kozai, 20; Rebs: H. Kozai, 7 Asts: R. Chokai, 5		Pts: L. De Miranda, 23; Rebs: G. Da Silva, 10; Asts: M. Silva, 14

Edel-optics.de Arena
Venue 1

==== Pool D ====
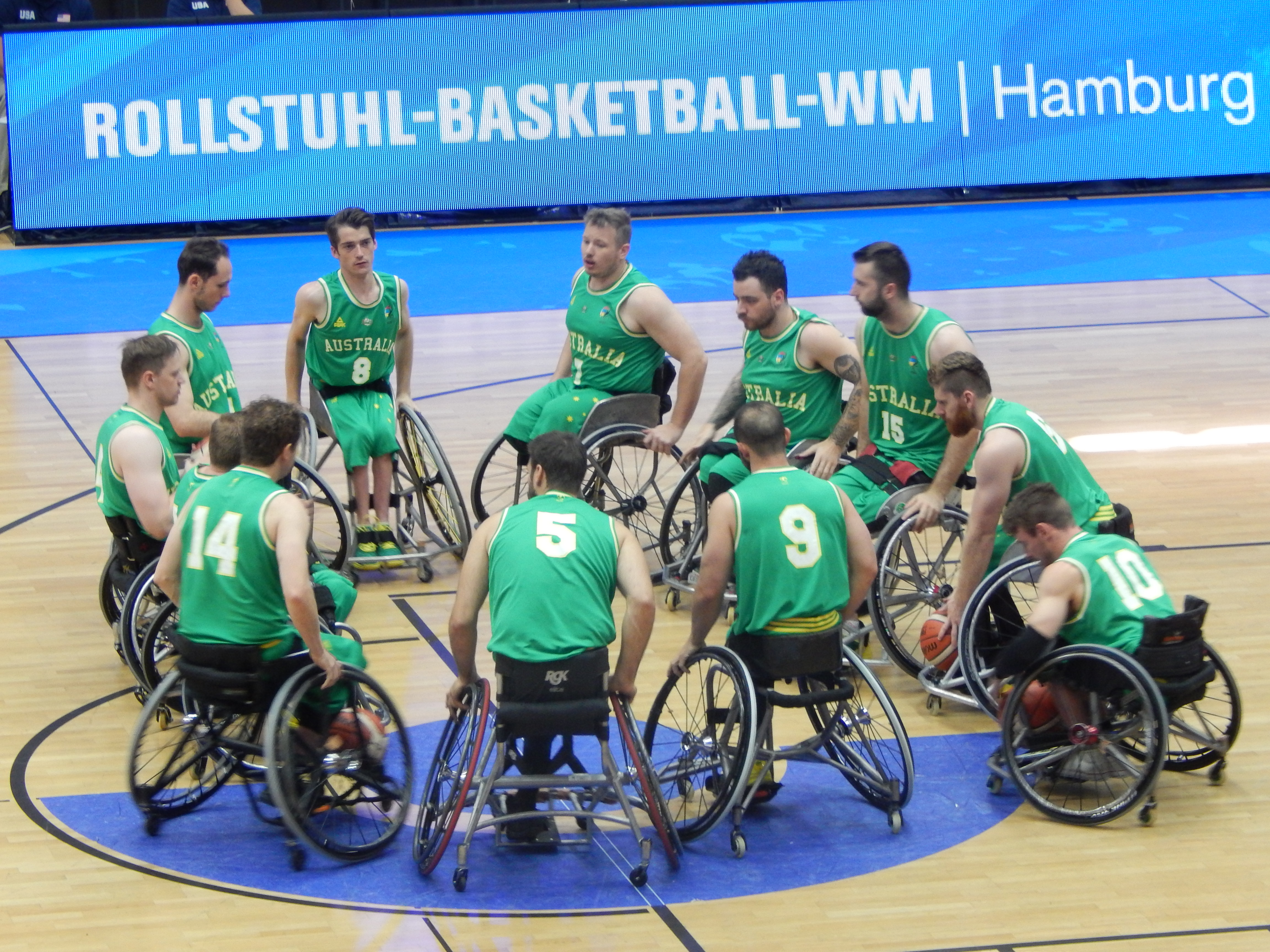
Australian Rollers

Team	Pld	W	L	PF	PA	PD	Pts.
Australia	3	2	1	193	169	+24	5
Netherlands	3	2	1	193	183	+10	5
Argentina	3	2	1	186	189	-3	5
Spain	3	0	3	170	201	-31	3

17 August 2018
12:15

Statistics

Australia	74–55	Argentina
Scoring by quarter: 20-18, 20-17, 20-18, 14-2
Scoring by half: 40-35, 34-20
Pts: T. O'Neill-Thorne, 17; Rebs: B. Latham, M. Auprince, 7 Asts: S. Norris 6		Pts: A. Berdun, 16; Rebs: C. Gomez, 9 Asts: A. Berdun, 9

Edel-optics.de Arena
Venue 2

18 August 2018
10:00

Statistics

Argentina	70–61	Netherlands
Scoring by quarter: 16-16, 22-13, 16-19, 16-13
Scoring by half: 38-29, 32-32
Pts: A. Berdun, 20; Rebs: C. Gomez, 14; Asts: A. Berdun, 9		Pts: R. Poggenwisch, 16; Rebs: R. Poggenwisch, 10; Asts: R. Poggenwisch, 12

Edel-optics.de Arena
Venue 2

18 August 2018
14:30

Statistics

Spain	56–66	Australia
Scoring by quarter: 14-20, 12-17, 12-12, 18-17
Scoring by half: 26-37, 30-29
Pts: J. Ruiz, 16; Rebs: A. Zarzuela, 9 Asts: P. Zarzuela, 6		Pts: Norris, 22; Rebs: Latham, 8 Asts: Knowles, 5

Edel-optics.de Arena
Venue 2

19 August 2018
19:45

Statistics

Netherlands	74–60	Spain
Scoring by quarter: 19-20, 16-14, 24-17, 15-9
Scoring by half: 35-34, 39-26
Pts: M. Korkmaz, 27; Rebs: M. Bellers, 10; Asts: M. Korkmaz, 8		Pts: A. Zarzuela, 20; Rebs: A. Zarzuela, 13; Asts: A. García Pereiro, 6

Edel-optics.de Arena
Venue 2

20 August 2018
12:15

Statistics

Spain	54–61	Argentina
Scoring by quarter: 15-16, 16-15, 9-20, 14-10
Scoring by half: 31-31, 23-30
Pts: A. García Pereiro, 19; Rebs: A. Zarzuela, García Pereiro, 9 Asts: A. García Pereiro, 11		Pts: A. Berdun, 21; Rebs: A. Pérez, 10; Asts: A. Berdun, 8

Edel-optics.de Arena
Venue 1

20 August 2018
14:30

Statistics

Netherlands	58–53	Australia
Scoring by quarter: 16-10, 12-10, 11-20, 19-13
Scoring by half: 28-20, 30-33
Pts: Korkmaz, Even, 15; Rebs: R. Poggenwisch, 16; Asts: R. Poggenwisch, 8		Pts: T. O'Neill-Thorne, 16; Rebs: S. Norris, 9 Asts: B. Latham, 5

Edel-optics.de Arena
Venue 1

=== Finals ===
Round of 16
17:30 21 August 2018
Iran	64
South Korea	48
20:45 21 August 2018
Netherlands	52
Turkey	60
09:30 21 August 2018
Japan	50
Spain	52
11:45 21 August 2018
Great Britain	62
Germany	54
10:00 21 August 2018
United States	82
Morocco	31
14:00 21 August 2018
Italy	46
Argentina	59
19:45 21 August 2018
Australia	73
Brazil	54
12:15 21 August 2018
Canada	68
Poland	79

Quarter-finals
18:00 22 August
Iran	78
Turkey	69
11:45 22 August
Spain	62
Great Britain	67
14:00 22 August
United States	72
Argentina	31
20:15 22 August
Australia	83
Poland	70

Semi-finals
18:00 24 August 2018
Iran	63
Great Britain	86
13:30 24 August 2018
United States	84
Australia	59

Final
15:30 26 August 2018
Great Britain	79
United States	62
Third place
13:15 26 August 2018
Australia	68
Iran	57

==== Round of 16 ====
21 August 2018
9:30

Statistics

Japan	50–52	Spain
Scoring by quarter: 14-10, 5-16, 10-18, 21-8
Scoring by half: 19-26, 31-26
Pts: H. Kozai, 12; Rebs: R. Chokai, 8 Asts: R. Fujimoto, 7		Pts: J. Ruiz, 20; Rebs: A. Zarzuela, 14; Asts: J. Ruiz, 8

Edel-optics.de Arena
Venue 1
Attendance: 724

21 August 2018
10:00

Statistics

United States	82–31	Morocco
Scoring by quarter: 24-4, 27-13, 19-10, 12-4
Scoring by half: 51-17, 31-14
Pts: J. Arambula, 14; Rebs: M. Scott, 6 Asts: M. Scott, 7		Pts: Megrini, Oulini, 9 Rebs: R. Maataoui, 9 Asts: Z. Challat, 4

Edel-optics.de Arena
Venue 2

21 August 2018
11:45

Statistics

Great Britain	62–54	Germany
Scoring by quarter: 19-13, 14-10, 15-12, 14-19
Scoring by half: 33-23, 29-31
Pts: G. Bates, 21; Rebs: S. Brown, 14; Asts: P. Pratt, 10		Pts: T. Bohme, 22; Rebs: T. Bohme, 10; Asts: A. Bienek, 7

Edel-optics.de Arena
Venue 1

21 August 2018
12:15

Statistics

Canada	68–79	Poland
Scoring by quarter: 15-21, 16-16, 21-26, 16-16
Scoring by half: 31-37, 37-42
Pts: N. Goncin, 25; Rebs: Anderson, 11; Asts: Anderson, 8		Pts: M. Balcerowski, 21; Rebs: Bandura, Łuszyński, Balcerowski, 5 Asts: M. Filipski, 9

Edel-optics.de Arena
Venue 2

21 August 2018
14:00

Statistics

Italy	46–59	Argentina
Scoring by quarter: 7-21, 13-13, 13-13, 13-12
Scoring by half: 20-34, 26-25
Pts: S. De Maggi, 16; Rebs: G. Papi, 7 Asts: M. Stupenengo, 4		Pts: C. Gomez, 22; Rebs: C. Gomez, 16; Asts: A. Berdun, 10

Edel-optics.de Arena
Venue 1
Attendance: 550

21 August 2018
17:30

Statistics

Iran	64–48	South Korea
Scoring by quarter: 16-18, 14-9, 15-14, 19-7
Scoring by half: 30-27, 34-21
Pts: M. Abedi, 20; Rebs: O. Hadiazhar, 10; Asts: M. Mohammad Nezhad, 3		Pts: S. Cho, 20; Rebs: D. Gim, 13; Asts: S. Cho, 6

Edel-optics.de Arena
Venue 2
Attendance: 143

21 August 2018
19:45

Statistics

Australia	73–54	Brazil
Scoring by quarter: 17-11, 19-14, 19-21, 18-8
Scoring by half: 36-25, 37-29
Pts: B. Latham, 20; Rebs: M. Auprince, 8 Asts: S. Norris, 8		Pts: M. Silva, 15; Rebs: De Miranda, M. Silva, 9 Asts: M. Silva, 14

Edel-optics.de Arena
Venue 2

21 August 2018
20:45

Statistics

Netherlands	52–60	Turkey
Scoring by quarter: 13-9, 11-18, 17-17, 11-16
Scoring by half: 24-27, 28-33
Pts: M. Korkmaz, 16; Rebs: R. Poggenwisch, 13; Asts: R. Poggenwisch, 5		Pts: Ö. Gürbulak, 18; Rebs: Ö. Gürbulak, 8 Asts: Ö. Gürbulak, 13

Edel-optics.de Arena
Venue 1

==== Quarter finals ====
22 August 2018
11:45

Statistics

Great Britain	67–62	Spain
Scoring by quarter: 19-19, 18-13, 14-13, 16-17
Scoring by half: 37-32, 30-30
Pts: G. Bates, 18; Rebs: P. Pratt, 10; Asts: P. Pratt, 10		Pts: J. Ruiz, 18; Rebs: A. Alejo, 16; Asts: P. Zarzuela, Ruiz, Alejo, 5

Edel-optics.de Arena
Venue 1

22 August 2018
14:00

Statistics

United States	72–31	Argentina
Scoring by quarter: 16-13, 18-3, 25-4, 13-11
Scoring by half: 34-16, 38-15
Pts: B. Bell, 12; Rebs: J. Arambula, 7 Asts: J. Arambula, 8		Pts: C. Gomez, 8 Rebs: A Pérez, 6 Asts: A. Berdun, 5

Edel-optics.de Arena
Venue 1
Attendance: 800

22 August 2018
18h00

Statistics

Iran	76–69	Turkey
Scoring by quarter: 13-19, 20-20, 20-17, 23-13
Scoring by half: 33-39, 43-30
Pts: M. Ebrahimi, 23; Rebs: M. Ebrahimi, 10; Asts: Hadiazhar, Mohammad Nezhad, 5		Pts: Ö. Gürbulak, 21; Rebs: Gürbulak, Gümüş, 8 Asts: Ö. Gürbulak, 12

Edel-optics.de Arena
Venue 1
Attendance: 1,573

22 August 2018
20h15

Statistics

Australia	83–70	Poland
Scoring by quarter: 19-20, 21-19, 23-11, 20-20
Scoring by half: 40-39, 43-31
Pts: T. O'Neill-Thorne, 22; Rebs: B. Latham, S. Norris, 5 Asts: S. Norris, 11		Pts: D. Mosler, 18; Rebs: D. Mosler, 9 Asts: M. Filipski, 11

Edel-optics.de Arena
Venue 1

==== Semi finals ====
24 August 2018
13:30

Statistics

United States	84–59	Australia
Scoring by quarter: 20-15, 19-14, 18-14, 27-16
Scoring by half: 39-29, 45-30
Pts: J. Williams, 29; Rebs: J. Williams, 6 Asts: S. Serio, 7		Pts: S. Norris, 14; Rebs: B. Latham, 6 Asts: T. Knowles, 4

Edel-optics.de Arena
Venue 1

24 August 2018
18:00

Statistics

Iran	63–86	Great Britain
Scoring by quarter: 12-17, 13-21, 16-24, 22-24
Scoring by half: 25-39, 38-48
Pts: O. Hadiazhar, 20; Rebs: O. Hadiazhar, 11; Asts: O. Hadiazhar, 6		Pts: G. Warburton, 22; Rebs: P. Pratt, Lee ManningL. Mannning, G. Bates 7 Asts: P. Pratt 9

Edel-optics.de Arena
Venue 1

==== Bronze medal ====
26 August 2018
13:15

Statistics

Australia	68–57	Iran
Scoring by quarter: 14-13, 15-18, 21-9, 18-17
Scoring by half: 29-31, 39-26
Pts: B. Latham, 17; Rebs: B. Latham, J. Blair, 7 Asts: T. O'Neill-Thorne, 7		Pts: O. Hadiazhar, 16; Rebs: M. Ebrahimi, 9 Asts: O. Hadiazhar, 8

Edel-optics.de Arena
Venue 1

==== Final ====
26 August 2018
15:30

Statistics

United States	62–79	Great Britain
Scoring by quarter: 18-20, 15-18, 14-16, 15-25
Scoring by half: 33-38, 29-41
Pts: J. Williams, 15; Rebs: S. Serio, 9 Asts: S. Serio, 6		Pts: G. Bates, H. Brown, 17; Rebs: S. Brown, P. Pratt, 8 Asts: P. Pratt, 12

Edel-optics.de Arena
Venue 1

=== Placement matches ===
15th place

23 August 2018
17:30

Statistics

Brazil	58–39	Morocco
Scoring by quarter: 18-9, 14-7, 8-9, 18-14
Scoring by half: 32-16, 26-23
Pts: Viana, M. Silva, L. Da Silva, De Miranda, 10; Rebs: L. De Miranda, 10; Asts: M. Silva, 6		Pts: K. Megrini, 10; Rebs: K. Megrini, 11; Asts: M. Oulini, 4

Edel-optics.de Arena
Venue 2
Attendance: 103

13th place

23 August 2018
19:45

Statistics

Germany	72–56	South Korea
Scoring by quarter: 13-6, 23-14, 19-13, 17-23
Scoring by half: 36-20, 36-36
Pts: T. Bohme, 29; Rebs: A. Halouski, 11; Asts: T. Bohme, 9		Pts: D. Gim, 19; Rebs: D. Gim, 11; Asts: S. Cho, 6

Edel-optics.de Arena
Venue 2
Attendance: 300

11th place

25 August 2018
9:30

Statistics

Canada	66–70	Italy
Scoring by quarter: 15-20, 16-19, 15-17, 20-14
Scoring by half: 31-39, 35-31
Pts: N. Goncin, 30; Rebs: P. Anderson, 11; Asts: P. Anderson, 7		Pts: A. Raourahi, 15; Rebs: J. Geninazzi, 13; Asts: M. Stupenengo, 12

Edel-optics.de Arena
Venue 1

9th place

25 August 2018
14:05

Japan	55–54	Netherlands
Scoring by quarter: 15-13, 10-16, 12-6, 18-19
Scoring by half: 25-29, 30-25
Pts: K. Akita, 25; Rebs: K. Akita, 11; Asts: T. Furusawa, 8		Pts: F. De Jong, 14; Rebs: R. Poggenwisch, 12; Asts: R. Poggenwisch, 11

Edel-optics.de Arena
Venue 1
Attendance: 234

Placement matches
12:15 23 August 2018
Turkey	65
Spain	67
14:30 23 August 2018
Argentina	66
Poland	72

5th Place
14:00 25 August 2018
Spain	79
Poland	52
7th Place
11:45 25 August 2018
Turkey	68
Argentina	77

23 August 2018
12:15

Statistics

Turkey	65–67	Spain
Scoring by quarter: 17-15, 17-15, 11-22, 20-15
Scoring by half: 34-30, 31-37
Pts: K. Safak, 21; Rebs: Gümüş, 9 Asts: Gümüş, 6		Pts: A. Diallo Diouf, 16; Rebs: Zarzuela, Diallo Diouf, 8 Asts: Zarzuela, 10

Edel-optics.de Arena
Venue 2

23 August 2018
14:30

Statistics

Argentina	66–72	Poland
Scoring by quarter: 18-16, 16-16, 20-14, 12-26
Scoring by half: 34-32, 32-40
Pts: A. Berdun, 19; Rebs: A. Pérez, 16; Asts: A. Berdun 10		Pts: K. Bandura, 25; Rebs: P. Łuszyński, 9 Asts: Filipski, Balcerowski, Łuszyński, 8

Edel-optics.de Arena
Vernue 2

7th place

25 August 2018
11:45

Statistics

Turkey	68–77	Argentina
Scoring by quarter: 14-21, 16-18, 24-20, 14-18
Scoring by half: 30-39, 38-38
Pts: Ö. Gürbulak, 21; Rebs: F. Gümüş, 8 Asts: Toprak, Gümüş, 5		Pts: A. Berdun, 27; Rebs: A. Pérez, 15; Asts: A. Berdun, 11

Edel-optics.de Arena
Venue 1

5th place

26 August 2018
10:00

Statistics

Spain	79–52	Poland
Scoring by quarter: 26-14, 24-8, 11-16, 18-14
Scoring by half: 50-22, 29-30
Pts: P. Zarzuela, 24; Rebs: P. Zarzuela, 7 Asts: A. Alejo, 5		Pts: Mosler, Macek, 10; Rebs: Mosler, Macek, Balcerowski, 5 Asts: M. Balcerowski, 5

Edel-optics.de Arena
Venue 1

=== Performances ===
==== Triple-double ====
Team	Player	Points	Rebounds	Assists	Opponent
Netherlands	Robin Poggenwisch (3.0)	16	10	12	Preliminary round - Pool D Argentina
Canada	Patrick Anderson (4.5)	24	15	10	Preliminary round - Pool A Germany
Great Britain	Philip Pratt (3.0)	17	10	10	Quarter-final; Spain

==== Double-double ====
Team	Player	Points	Rebounds	Assists	Opponent
Germany	Kai Möller (3.0)	10	11	1	Preliminary round - Pool A Morocco
Canada	Patrick Anderson (4.5)	26	10	7	Preliminary round - Pool A Morocco
Turkey	Özgür Gürbulak (4.0)	21	9	12	Preliminary round - Pool C Brazil
Brazil	Gelson José Junior Da Silva (3.0)	14	11	3	Preliminary round - Pool C Turkey
Argentina	Cristian Gomez (4.5)	10	14	2	Preliminary round - Pool D Netherlands
Germany	Jan Christoph Gans (4.0)	13	15	3	Preliminary round - Pool A Iran
Turkey	Özgür Gürbulak (4.0)	21	9	18	Preliminary round - Pool C Japan
Japan	Hiroaki Kozai (3.5)	16	10	7	Preliminary round - Pool C Turkey
South Korea	Dong-Hyeon Gim (4.0)	20	12	2	Preliminary round - Pool B Poland
Italy	Giulio Maria Papi (4.0)	19	16	8	Preliminary round - Pool C Turkey
Netherlands	Mattijs Bellers (4.5)	12	10	0	Preliminary round - Pool D Spain
Germany	Aliaksandr Halouski (4.5)	12	11	5	Preliminary round - Pool A Canada
Spain	Alejandro Zarzuela (3.0)	20	13	0	Preliminary round - Pool D Netherlands
Great Britain	Lee Manning (4.5)	15	14	0	Preliminary round - Pool B United States
Brazil	Gelson José Junior Da Silva (3.0)	14	10	1	Preliminary round - Pool C Japan
Canada	Patrick Anderson (4.5)	34	13	5	Preliminary round - Pool A Iran
Spain	Asier García Pereiro (4.0)	19	9	11	Preliminary round - Pool D Argentina
Argentina	Adrián Jesús Pérez (3.0)	11	10	0	Preliminary round - Pool D Spain
South Korea	Dong-Hyeon Gim (4.0)	26	11	3	Preliminary round - Pool B United States
Spain	Alejandro Zarzuela (3.0)	10	14	6	Round of 16; Japan
Great Britain	Philip Pratt (3.0)	13	4	10	Round of 16; Germany
Germany	Thomas Bohme (3.0)	22	10	2	Round of 16; Great Britain
Canada	Patrick Anderson (4.5)	19	11	8	Round of 16; Poland
Argentina	Cristian Gomez (4.5)	22	16	2	Round of 16; Italy
Argentina	Adrián Jesús Pérez (3.0)	10	10	2	Round of 16; Italy
Iran	Omid Hadiazhar (4.0)	19	10	1	Round of 16; South Korea
South Korea	Dong Hyeon Gim (4.0)	19	13	2	Round of 16; Iran
Brazil	Marcos Silva (3.0)	15	9	14	Round of 16; Australia
Netherlands	Mattijs Bellers (4.5)	13	12	0	Round of 16; Turkey
Turkey	Özgür Gürbulak (4.0)	18	8	13	Round of 16; Netherlands
Spain	Agustin Alejo (4.5)	16	16	5	Quarter-final; Great Britain
Iran	Morteza Ebrahimi (4.5)	23	10	2	Quarter-final; Turkey
Turkey	Özgür Gürbulak (4.0)	21	8	12	Quarter-final; Iran
Australia	Shaun Norris (3.0)	15	5	11	Quarter-final; Poland
Poland	Mateusz Filipski (4.0)	16	6	11	Quarter-final; Australia
Spain	Pablo Zarzuela (3.0)	11	4	10	Classement - places 5-8; Turkey
Argentina	Adolfo Berdun (3.5)	19	4	10	Classement - places 5-8; Poland
Argentina	Cristian Gomez (4.5)	11	14	1	Classement - places 5-8; Poland
Argentina	Adrián Jesús Pérez (3.0)	13	16	2	Classement - places 5-8; Poland
Great Britain	Philip Pratt (3.0)	12	8	12	Gold medal match United States

==== All-Star Team ====
Nation	Name	Class
Argentina	Gustavo Villafañe	1.0
United States	Jake Williams	2.5
United States	Steve Serio	3.5
Iran	Omid Hadiazhar	4.0
Great Britain	Gregg Warburton (MVP)	2.0

=== Final standings ===
Rank	Team
1	Great Britain
2	United States
3	Australia
4	Iran
5	Spain
6	Poland
7	Argentina
8	Turkey
9	Japan
10	Netherlands
11	Italy
12	Canada
13	Germany
14	South Korea
15	Brazil
16	Morocco

== Women ==
=== Preliminary round ===
==== Pool A ====
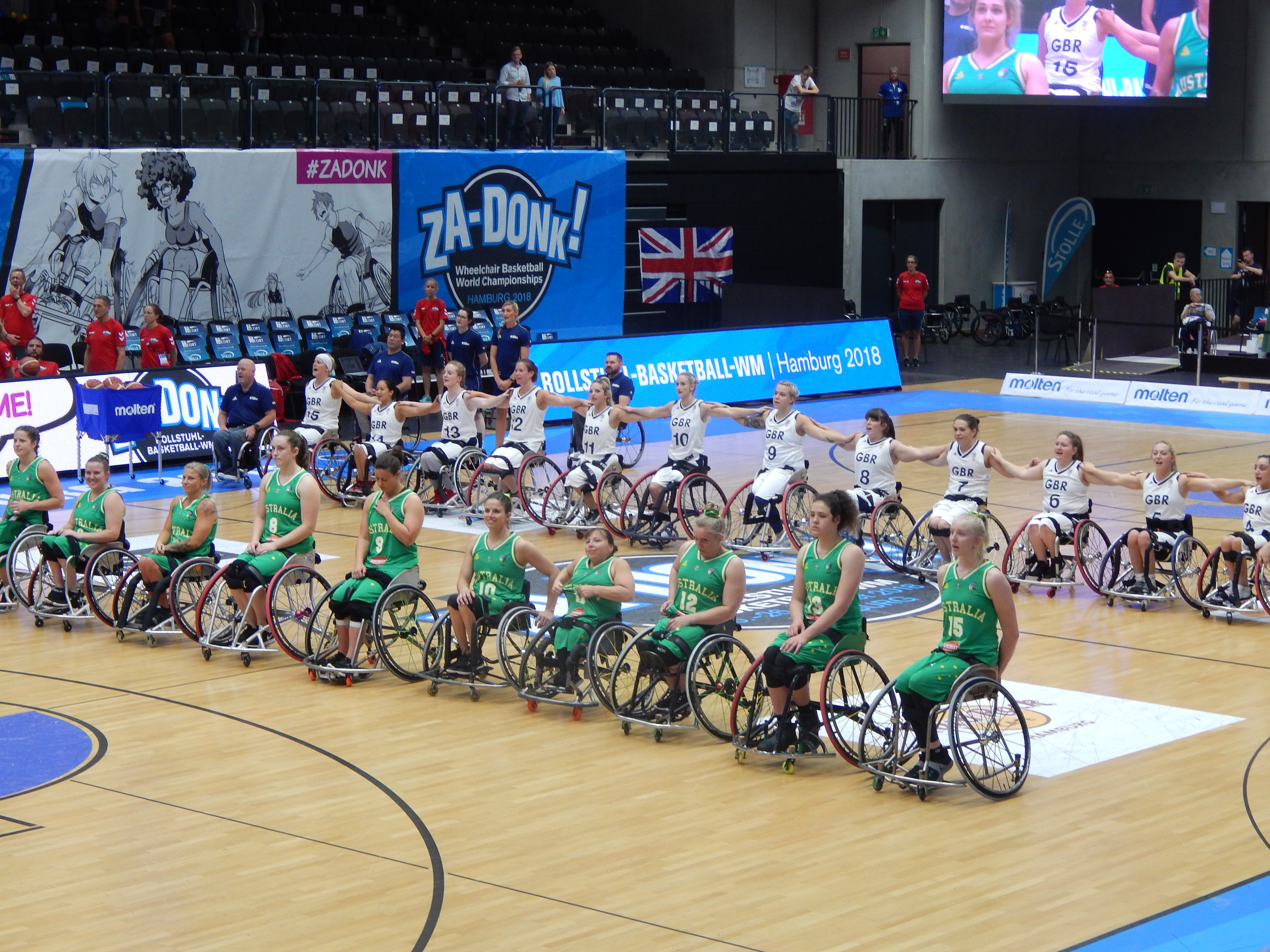
Australian Gliders and Team Great Britain

Team	Pld	W	L	PF	PA	PD	Pts.
Netherlands	5	5	0	354	176	+178	10
Great Britain	5	4	1	287	243	+44	9
Canada	5	3	2	314	288	+26	8
Spain	5	2	3	185	279	-94	7
Australia	5	1	4	248	302	-54	6
Brazil	5	0	5	208	308	-100	5

16 August 2018
9:30

Statistics

Netherlands	86–24	Spain
Scoring by quarter: 18-4, 12-8, 26-4, 30-8
Scoring by half: 30-12, 56-12
Pts: M. Beijer, 37; Rebs: B. Kramer, 11; Asts: C. De Rooij, 10		Pts: V. Alonso, 10; Rebs: V. Alonso, 8 Asts: V. Perez, 2

Edel-optics.de Arena
Venue 1

17 August 2018
10:00

Statistics

Australia	61–44	Brazil
Scoring by quarter: 8-20, 14-8, 17-10, 22-6
Scoring by half: 22-28, 39-16
Pts: Merritt 22; Rebs: Crispin 11; Asts: Crispin 5		Pts: Almeida, Mendes Rosa, 12; Rebs: Almeida, 7 Asts: Dos Santos Assunção, Mendes Rosa, 4

Edel-optics.de Arena
Venue 2

17 August 2018
14:00

Statistics

Canada	56–64	Great Britain
Scoring by quarter: 15-18, 16-19, 10-12, 15-15
Scoring by half: 31-37, 25-27
Pts: Young 23; Rebs: Young 15; Asts: Young 5		Pts: Williams, Conroy 14; Rebs: Freeman 16; Asts: Freeman 11

Edel-optics.de Arena
Venue 1

18 August 2018
12:15

Statistics

Spain	34–63	Canada
Scoring by quarter: 19-8, 6-21, 6-15, 3-19
Scoring by half: 25-29, 9-34
Pts: V. Alonso, 14; Rebs: V. Alonso, 11; Asts: V. Perez, 2		Pts: A. Young, 19; Rebs: C. Ouellet, 7 Asts: C. Ouellet, 6

Edel-optics.de Arena
Venue 2

18 August 2018
16:15

Brazil	45–72	Great Britain
Scoring by quarter: 12-18, 13-19, 10-19, 10-16
Scoring by half: 25-37, 20-35
Pts: V. Almeida, 19; Rebs: A. Mendes Rosa, 7 Asts: A. Mendes Rosa, 4		Pts: Conroy, 28; Rebs: Conroy, 9 Asts: Freeman, 19

Edel-optics.de Arena
Venue 1

18 August 2018
19:45

Statistics

Netherlands	65–32	Australia
Scoring by quarter: 16-10, 8-10, 23-6, 18-6
Scoring by half: 24-20, 41-12
Pts: M. Beijer, 28; Rebs: B. Kramer, 16; Asts: B. Kramer, 13		Pts: Vinci, 8 Rebs: Crispin, 9 Asts: Merrit, 5

Edel-optics.de Arena
Venue 2

19 August 2018
10:00

Statistics

Great Britain	47–38	Spain
Scoring by quarter: 8-12, 11-10, 15-10, 13-6
Scoring by half: 19-22, 28-16
Pts: Freeman, 13; Rebs: Freeman, 8 Asts: Freeman, 7		Pts: V. Perez, 19; Rebs: Perez, Alonso, 8 Asts: V. Perez, 4

Edel-optics.de Arena
Venue 2

19 August 2018
17:30

Statistics

Australia	74–82 ()	Canada
Scoring by quarter: 14-17, 14-16, 20-20, 20-15, Overtime: 6-14
Scoring by half: 28-33, 46-49 Overtime: 6-14
Pts: Crispin, 19; Rebs: Del Toso, 12; Asts: Crispin, 7		Pts: Young, 31; Rebs: Young, 15; Asts: Lalonde, Ouellet, 8

Edel-optics.de Arena
Venue 2

20 August
19:45

Statistics

Brazil	27–73	Netherlands
Scoring by quarter: 6-27, 9-20, 12-15, 0-11
Scoring by half: 15-47, 12-26
Pts: V. Almeida, 15; Rebs: Almeida, Santos Reis, 9 Asts: A. Mendes Rosa, 5		Pts: M. Beijer, 31; Rebs: B. Kramer, 18; Asts: B. Kramer, 7

Edel-optics.de Arena
Venue 2

20 August 2018
20:15

Statistics

Great Britain	63–38	Australia
Scoring by quarter: 19-14, 19-8, 12-8, 13-8
Scoring by half: 38-22, 25-16
Pts: Conroy, 21; Rebs: Freeman, Conroy, 11; Asts: Freeman, 12		Pts: Crispin, 9 Rebs: Crispin, 9 Asts: Crispin, 7

Edel-optics.de Arena
Venue 1

21 August 2018
9:30

Statistics

Spain	41–40	Brazil
Scoring by quarter: 14-8, 5-8, 14-4, 8-20
Scoring by half: 19-16, 22-24
Pts: V. Alonso, 16; Rebs: Alonso, Montiel, 8 Asts: Montiel, Tapia, 4		Pts: V. Almeida, 18; Rebs: P. Dos Santos Assunção, 7 Asts: A. Mendes Rosa, 7

Edel-optics.de Arena
Venue 1

21 August 2018
18:30

Statistics

Canada	52–64	Netherlands
Scoring by quarter: 11-17, 14-18, 14-12, 13-17
Scoring by half: 25-35, 27-29
Pts: A. Young, 21; Rebs: C. Ouellet, 7 Asts: A. Young, 6		Pts: M. Beijer, 36; Rebs: Kramer, Beijer, 12; Asts: J. Visser, 6

Edel-optics.de Arena
Venue 1
Attendance: 200

22 August 2018
10:00

Statistics

Canada	61–52	Brazil
Scoring by quarter: 12-11, 14-19, 17-14, 18-8
Scoring by half: 26-30, 35-22
Pts: C. Ouellet, 26; Rebs: C. Ouellet, 8 Asts: R. Lalonde, 7		Pts: V. Almeida, 26; Rebs: V. Almeida, 8 Asts: A. Mendes Rosa, 9

Edel-optics.de Arena
Venue 2

22 August 2018
14:30

Statistics

Spain	48–43	Australia
Scoring by quarter: 10-12, 15-13, 14-9, 9-9
Scoring by half: 25-25, 23-18
Pts: V. Perez, 21; Rebs: V. Perez, 13; Asts: Perez, Ruiz, 3		Pts: A. Merritt, 14; Rebs: C. Crispin, 7 Asts: Crispin, Merritt, 3

Edel-optics.de Arena
Venue 2

22 August 2018
17:30

Statistics

Netherlands	66–41	Great Britain
Scoring by quarter: 16-6, 9-11, 25-11, 16-13
Scoring by half: 25-17, 41-24
Pts: M. Beijer, 31; Rebs: B. Kramer, 10; Asts: C. De Rooij, 9		Pts: L. Williams, 10; Rebs: H. Freeman, 6 Asts: H. Freeman, 5

Edel-optics.de Arena
Venue 2
Attendance: 350

==== Pool B ====
Team	Pld	W	L	PF	PA	PD	Pts.
Germany	5	5	0	337	171	+168	10
China	5	4	1	304	188	+118	9
United States	5	3	2	287	202	+85	8
France	5	2	3	201	231	-30	7
Argentina	5	1	4	181	273	-92	6
Algeria	5	0	5	125	390	-265	5

16 August 2018
11:45

Statistics

China	60–38	Argentina
Scoring by quarter: 17-4, 15-4, 15-18, 13-12
Scoring by half: 32-8, 28-30
Pts: S. Lin, 16; Rebs: X. Zhang, 5 Asts: Y. Long, 4		Pts: M. Pallares, 16; Rebs: M. Pallares, 9 Asts: M. Pallares, 5

Edel-optics.de Arena
Venue 1

16 August 2018
20:00

Statistics

Germany	87–24	Algeria
Scoring by quarter: 28-12, 23-2, 23-8, 13-2
Scoring by half: 51-14, 36-10
Pts: Mohnen, 16; Rebs: Groß, 9 Asts: Miller, 6		Pts: D. Khemgani, 15; Rebs: D. Khemgani, 7 Asts: D. Khemgani, 3

Edel-optics.de Arena
Venue 1

17 August 2018
14:30

Statistics

France	27–58	China
Scoring by quarter: 5-10, 10-16, 8-18, 4-14
Scoring by half: 15-26, 12-32
Pts: G. Wembolua, 12; Rebs: G. Wembolua, 6 Asts: Wembolua, Buso, Quemener-Pichon, 2		Pts: S. Lin, 12; Rebs: G. Lyu, 10; Asts: S. Lin, 10

Edel-optics.de Arena
Venue 2

17 August
17:30

Statistics

United States	85–13	Algeria
Scoring by quarter: 24-8, 21-1, 21-0, 19-4
Scoring by half: 45-9, 40-4
Pts: M. Wood, 20; Rebs: B. Moody, 11; Asts: Wood, Hollerman, 8		Pts: N. Boublal, 8 Rebs: N. Boublal, 7 Asts: D. Khemgani, 2

Edel-optics.de Arena
Venue 2

17 August 2018
18:00

Statistics

Germany	64–16	Argentina
Scoring by quarter: 21-6, 19-4, 17-4, 7-2
Scoring by half: 40-10, 24-6
Pts: Miller, 15; Rebs: Lang, 11; Asts: Mohnen, 6		Pts: M. Perez, 8 Rebs: M. Pallares, 9 Asts: Linari, Pallares, 2

Edel-optics.de Arena
Venue 1

18 August 2018
17:30

Statistics

Algeria	20–80	China
Scoring by quarter: 5-17, 10-19, 0-22, 5-22
Scoring by half: 15-36, 5-44
Pts: D. Khemgani, 11; Rebs: D. Khemgani, 7 Asts: S. Abdelali, 2		Pts: S. Lin, 28; Rebs: X. Zhang, 7 Asts: X. Zhang, Lin, 4

Edel-optics.de Arena
Venue 2

18 August 2018
14:00

Statistics

France	33–58	Germany
Scoring by quarter: 12-17, 4-12, 6-17, 11-12
Scoring by half: 16-29, 17-29
Pts: G. Wembolua, 7 Rebs: L. Nolet, 5 Asts: A. Glemp-Etavard, 3		Pts: Miller, Mohnen, 19; Rebs: Mohnen, 7 Asts: Mohnen, 5

Edel-optics.de Arena
Venue 1

19 August 2018
11:45

Statistics

Germany	70–56	United States
Scoring by quarter: 17-9, 24-9, 11-16, 18-22
Scoring by half: 41-18, 29-38
Pts: M. Mohnen, 27; Rebs: M. Miller, 11; Asts: M. Mohnen, 11		Pts: M. Wood, 30; Rebs: Hollerman, 14; Asts: Wood, Dunkin, 5

Edel-optics.de Arena
Venue 1

19 August 2018
14:30

Statistics

Argentina	65–40	Algeria
Scoring by quarter: 24-6, 12-8, 18-10, 11-16
Scoring by half: 36-14, 29-26
Pts: M. Pallares, 20; Rebs: M. Pallares, 16; Asts: M. Pallares, 7		Pts: D. Khemgani, 16; Rebs: N. Boublal, 8 Asts: F. Bouzidi, 2

Edel-optics.de Arena
Venue 2

20 August 2018
9:30

Statistics

Argentina	32–43	France
Scoring by quarter: 8-15, 10-6, 2-19, 12-3
Scoring by half: 18-21, 14-22
Pts: M. Pallares, 18; Rebs: M. Pallares, 12; Asts: S. Linari, 3		Pts: M. Buso, 24; Rebs: M. Buso, 11; Asts: G. Wembolua, 4

Edel-optics.de Arena
Venue 2

20 August 2018
18:00

Statistics

China	64–43	United States
Scoring by quarter: 14-14, 12-10, 22-8, 16-11
Scoring by half: 26-24, 38-19
Pts: X. Zhang, 22; Rebs: X. Zhang, 8 Asts: X. Huang, 8		Pts: M. Wood, 18; Rebs: M. Wood, 8 Asts: Hollerman, 9

Edel-optics.de Arena
Venue 1

21 August 2018
16:15

Statistics

United States	57–25	France
Scoring by quarter: 9-5, 14-4, 14-10, 20-6
Scoring by half: 23-9, 34-16
Pts: R. Hollerman, 26; Rebs: R. Hollerman, 15; Asts: M. Wood, 9		Pts: M. Buso, 11; Rebs: M. Buso, 6 Asts: G. Wembolua, 3

Edel-optics.de Arena
Venue 1
Attendance: 257

22 August 2018
9:30

Statistics

China	42–58	Germany
Scoring by quarter: 12-17, 6-13, 14-12, 10-16
Scoring by half: 18-30, 24-28
Pts: X. Zhang, Lin, 10; Rebs: X. Zhang, Lin, 4 Asts: Y. Long, 6		Pts: M. Miller, 24; Rebs: M. Mohnen, 9 Asts: M. Mohnen, 8

Edel-optics.de Arena
Venue 1

22 August 2018
12:15

Statistics

United States	66–30	Argentina
Scoring by quarter: 21-11, 20-11, 12-4, 13-4
Scoring by half: 41-22, 25-8
Pts: R. Hollerman, 17; Rebs: A. Dunkin, 6 Asts: R. Hollerman, 8		Pts: M. Pallares, 14; Rebs: M. Pallares, 12; Asts: M. Pallares, 6

Edel-optics.de Arena
Venue 2
Attendance: 112

22 August 2018
17:30

Statistics

Algeria	28–73	France
Scoring by quarter: 14-20, 5-13, 3-22, 6-18
Scoring by half: 19-33, 9-40
Pts: Khemgani, Boublal, 9 Rebs: N. Boublal, 12; Asts: D. Khemgani, 6		Pts: S. Thieurmel, 15; Rebs: F. Saint-Omer Delepine, 13; Asts: F. Saint-Omer Delepine, 4

Edel-optics.de Arena
Venue 2
Attendance: 100

=== Finals ===
Quarter-finals
18:00 23 August 2018
Netherlands	79
France	36
11:45 23 August 2018
China	63
Canada	56
20:15 23 August 2018
Germany	59
Spain	33
14:00 23 August 2018
Great Britain	70
United States	47

Semi-finals
20:15 24 August 2018
Netherlands	54
China	29
15:45 24 August 2018
Germany	37
Great Britain	60

Final
20:15 25 August 2018
Netherlands	56
Great Britain	40
Bronze Final
18:00 25 August 2018
Germany	44
China	43

==== Quarter finals ====
23 August 2018
11:45

Statistics

China	63–56	Canada
Scoring by quarter: 15-12, 13-13, 19-10, 16-21
Scoring by half: 28-25, 35-31
Pts: X. Zhang, Lyu, 16; Rebs: X. Zhang, 11; Asts: S. Lin, 10		Pts: C. Ouellet, 23; Rebs: C. Ouellet, 9 Asts: A. Young, 6

Edel-optics.de Arena
Venue 1

23 August 2018
14:00

Statistics

Great Britain	70–47	United States
Scoring by quarter: 15-10, 19-13, 16-15, 20-9
Scoring by half: 34-23, 36-24
Pts: Freeman, 23; Rebs: Freeman, 8 Asts: Freeman, Conroy, 6		Pts: R. Hollerman, 23; Rebs: R. Hollerman, 8 Asts: Wood, Hollerman, 5

Edel-optics.de Arena
Venue 1
Attendance: 800

23 August 2018
18:00

Statistics

Netherlands	79–36	France
Scoring by quarter: 28-6, 14-10, 19-6, 18-14
Scoring by half: 42-16, 37-20
Pts: B. Kramer, 23; Rebs: M. Beijer, 12; Asts: C. De Rooij, 8		Pts: A. Quéméner-Pichon, 10; Rebs: M. Buso, 5 Asts: A. Glemp-Etavard, 7

Edel-optics.de Arena
Venue 1

23 August 2018
20:15

Statistics

Germany	59–33	Spain
Scoring by quarter: 17-12, 11-7, 17-10, 14-4
Scoring by half: 28-19, 31-14
Pts: Miller, Mohnen, 18; Rebs: M. Miller, 7 Asts: M. Mohnen, 6		Pts: V. Alonso, 9 Rebs: V. Perez, 12; Asts: Perez, Ruiz, Montiel, 3

Edel-optics.de Arena
Venue 1

==== Semi finals ====
24 August 2018
20:15

Statistics

Netherlands	54–29	China
Scoring by quarter: 17-4, 10-9, 16-2, 11-14
Scoring by half: 27-13, 27-16
Pts: B. Kramer, 16; Rebs: M. Beijer, 16; Asts: M. Beijer, 5		Pts: S. Lin, 13; Rebs: X. Zhang, 8 Asts: X. Zhang, 3

Edel-optics.de Arena
Venue 1

24 August 2018
15:45

Statistics

Germany	37–60	Great Britain
Scoring by quarter: 6-13, 8-22, 15-14, 8-11
Scoring by half: 14-32, 23-25
Pts: Miller, Mohnen, 9 Rebs: Miller, 7 Asts: Mohnen, 5		Pts: Freeman, 31; Rebs: Freeman, 12; Asts: Freeman, 9

Edel-optics.de Arena
Venue 1

==== Bronze medal ====
25 August 2018
18:00

Statistics

China	43–44	Germany
Scoring by quarter: 10-6, 18-17, 9-13, 6-8
Scoring by half: 28-23, 15-21
Pts: X. Zhang, 14; Rebs: X. Zhang, Lin, 9 Asts: Lin, Huang, 5		Pts: M. Miller, 19; Rebs: M. Miller, 14; Asts: M. Miller, 7

Edel-optics.de Arena
Venue 1

==== Final ====
25 August 2018
20:15

Statistics

Netherlands	56–40	Great Britain
Scoring by quarter: 19-10, 12-10, 7-12, 18-8
Scoring by half: 31-20, 25-20
Pts: M. Beijer, 21; Rebs: B. Kramer, 13; Asts: C. De Rooij, 7		Pts: R. Love, 12; Rebs: Conroy, Love, 7 Asts: H. Freeman, 8

Edel-optics.de Arena
Venue 1

=== Placement matches ===
Placement matches
10:00 23 August 2018
Australia	90
Algeria	25
09:30 23 August 2018
Argentina	30
Brazil	78

9th Place
15:15 24 August 2018
Australia	55
Brazil	53
11th Place
13:00 24 August 2018
Algeria	30
Argentina	59

23 August 2018
9:30

Statistics

Argentina	30–78	Brazil
Scoring by quarter: 8-24, 2-19, 9-21, 11-14
Scoring by half: 10-43, 20-35
Pts: M. Pallares, 12; Rebs: M. Capdeville, 8 Asts: M. Pallares, 4		Pts: V. Almeida, 34; Rebs: V. Almeida, 13; Asts: V. Almeida, 12

Edel-optics.de Arena
Venue 2

23 August 2018
10:00

Statistics

Australia	90–25	Algeria
Scoring by quarter: 33-7, 23-10, 14-4, 20-4
Scoring by half: 56-17, 34-8
Pts: Munro-Cook, 28; Rebs: Munro-Cook, 9 Asts: Cronau, 13		Pts: D. Khemgani, 12; Rebs: N. Boublal, 8 Asts: D. Khemgani, 4

Edel-optics.de Arena
Venue 2

24 August 2018
15:15

Statistics

Australia	55–53	Brazil
Scoring by quarter: 11-12, 15-8, 18-14, 11-19
Scoring by half: 26-20, 29-33
Pts: Munro-Cook, 18; Rebs: Crispin, 10; Asts: Cronau, 7		Pts: Almeida, 20; Rebs: Almeida, 11; Asts: Almeida, 7

Edel-optics.de Arena
Venue 2

24 August 2018
10:00

Statistics

Argentina	59–30	Algeria
Scoring by quarter: 25-4, 12-8, 8-10, 14-8
Scoring by half: 37-12, 22-18
Pts: M. Pallares, 28; Rebs: M. Pallares, 16; Asts: J. Olmedo, 5		Pts: D. Khedir, 8 Rebs: N. Semati, 8 Asts: D. Khedir, 3

Edel-optics.de Arena
Venue 2

Placement matches
17:30 23 August 2018
France	38
Canada	77
19:45 23 August 2018
Spain	54
United States	56

5th Place
12:15 25 August 2018
Canada	68
United States	53
7th Place
10:00 25 August 2018
France	34
Spain	43

24 August 2018
17:30

Statistics

France	38–77	Canada
Scoring by quarter: 10-11, 22-10, 15-14, 20-3
Scoring by half: 32-21, 35-17
Pts: Young, 12; Rebs: Llanes, 7 Asts: Dandeneau, 6		Pts: Wenbolua, 11; Rebs: Buso, 7 Asts: Wenbolua, 4

Edel-optics.de Arena
Venue 1

24 August 2018
19:45

Statistics

United States	56–54	Spain
Scoring by quarter: 17-18, 15-11, 14-10, 9-16
Scoring by half: 32-29, 23-26
Pts: Hollermann, 31; Rebs: Hollermann, 11; Asts: Wood, 11		Pts: Perez, 19; Rebs: Perez, 10; Asts: Ruiz, 9

Edel-optics.de Arena
Venue 2

25 August 2018
12:15

Statistics

United States	53–68	Canada
Scoring by quarter: 10-17, 12-20, 16-20, 15-11
Scoring by half: 22-37, 31-31
Pts: Hollermann, 19; Rebs: Oberst, 8 Asts: Wood, 10		Pts: Ouellet, 19; Rebs: Young, 10; Asts: Lalonde, 9

Edel-optics.de Arena
Venue 1

25 August 2018
19:45

Statistics

Spain	43–34	France
Scoring by quarter: 18-10, 7-6, 11-10, 7-8
Scoring by half: 25-16, 18-18
Pts: Alonso, 18; Rebs: Perez, 7 Asts: Montiel, 6		Pts: Buso, 9 Rebs: Buso, 9 Asts: Buso, 4

Edel-optics.de Arena
Venue 2

=== Performances ===
==== Triple-double ====
Team	Player	Points	Rebounds	Assists	Opponent
Great Britain	Helen Freeman (4.0)	13	16	11	Preliminary round - Pool A Canada
Netherlands	Bo Kramer (4.5)	11	16	13	Preliminary round - Pool A Australia
Germany	Marina Mohnen (4.5)	27	10	11	Preliminary round - Pool B United States
Great Britain	Helen Freeman (4.0)	13	11	12	Preliminary round - Pool A Australia
Brazil	Vileide Almeida (4.5)	34	13	12	Classement - places 9-12; Argentina

==== Double-double ====
Team	Player	Points	Rebounds	Assists	Opponent
Netherlands	Bo Kramer (4.5)	23	11	2	Preliminary round - Pool A Spain
Australia	Cobi Crispin (4.0)	14	11	5	Preliminary round - Pool A Brazil
Canada	Arinn Young (4.5)	23	15	5	Preliminary round - Pool A Great Britain
China	Suiling Lin (3.0)	12	2	10	Preliminary round - Pool B France
China	Guidi Lyu (4.0)	10	10	0	Preliminary round - Pool B France
Germany	Katharina Lang (4.5)	12	11	4	Preliminary round - Pool B Argentina
Spain	Victoria Alonso (4.0)	14	11	0	Preliminary round - Pool A Canada
Netherlands	Mariska Beijer (4.0)	28	15	4	Preliminary round - Pool A Australia
Germany	Mareike Miller (4.5)	20	11	4	Preliminary round - Pool B United States
Argentina	Maria Pallares (4.0)	20	16	7	Preliminary round - Pool B Algeria
Australia	Cobi Crispin (4.0)	19	11	7	Preliminary round - Pool A Canada
Canada	Arinn Young (4.5)	31	15	5	Preliminary round - Pool A Australia
Argentina	Maria Pallares (4.0)	18	12	2	Preliminary round - Pool B France
France	Marianne Buso (4.5)	24	11	1	Preliminary round - Pool B Argentina
Netherlands	Bo Kramer (4.5)	26	18	7	Preliminary round - Pool A Brazil
Great Britain	Amy Conroy (4.0)	21	11	1	Preliminary round - Pool A Australia
United States	Rose Hollerman (3.5)	26	15	7	Preliminary round - Pool B France
Netherlands	Bo Kramer (4.5)	22	12	4	Preliminary round - Pool A Canada
Netherlands	Mariska Beijer (4.0)	36	12	3	Preliminary round - Pool A Canada
Argentina	Maria Pallares (4.0)	14	12	6	Preliminary round - Pool B United States États-Unis
Spain Espagne	Virginia Perez (4.0)	21	13	3	Preliminary round - Pool A Australia
Spain Espagne	Victoria Alonso (4.0)	12	11	1	Preliminary round - Pool A Australia
France	Fabienne Saint-Omer (4.5)	10	13	4	Preliminary round - Pool B Algeria
Netherlands	Bo Kramer (4.5)	18	10	3	Preliminary round - Pool A Great Britain
China	Xuemei Zhang (4.0)	16	11	3	quarter final Canada
China	Suiling Lin (3.0)	12	8	10	quarter final Canada
Netherlands	Mariska Beijer (4.0)	19	12	4	quarter final France
Argentina	Maria Pallares (4.0)	28	16	4	11th place Algeria
Australia	Cobi Crispin (4.0)	14	10	4	9th place Brazil
Brazil	Vileide Almeida (4.5)	20	11	7	9th place Australia
Spain	Virginia Perez (4.0)	19	10	5	Placement - places 5-8; United States
United States	Morgan Wood (3.0)	15	5	11	Placement - places 5-8; Spain
United States	Rose Hollerman (3.5)	31	11	6	Placement - places 5-8; Spain
Great Britain	Helen Freeman (4.0)	31	12	9	Semi final Germany
Netherlands	Bo Kramer (4.5)	16	16	4	Semi final China
Netherlands	Mariska Beijer (4.0)	16	10	5	Semi final China
Germany	Mareike Miller (4.5)	19	14	7	Bronze medal China
Netherlands	Mariska Beijer (4.0)	21	12	2	Final; Great Britain

==== All-Star Team ====
Nation	Name	Class
Netherlands	Jitske Visser	1.0
Spain	Sonia Ruiz Escribano	2.5
China	Suiling Lin	3.0
Great Britain	Helen Freeman	4.0
Netherlands	Mariska Beijer (MVP)	4.0

=== Final standings ===
Rank	Team
1	Netherlands
2	Great Britain
3	Germany
4	China
5	Canada
6	United States
7	Spain
8	France
9	Australia
10	Brazil
11	Argentina
12	Algeria

== Controversy ==
During the women's game between China and Algeria, a Chinese coach struck one of his players. When the incident was reported to the Tournament Technical Committee (TTC), it immediately issued a one-match suspension. This was the maximum penalty that it could impose. However, the TTC felt that this penalty was inadequate, and referred the matter to the Secretary General of the International Wheelchair Basketball Federation, Maureen Orchard, who suspended the coach from the tournament.
