= Australia at the 2004 Summer Paralympics =

- IPC code: AUS
- NPC: Australian Paralympic Committee
- Website: www.paralympic.org.au

in Athens
- Competitors: 151
- Flag bearer: Louise Sauvage (Opening) Matthew Cowdrey (Closing)
- Medals Ranked 5th: Gold 26 Silver 39 Bronze 36 Total 101

Summer Paralympics appearances (overview)
- 1960; 1964; 1968; 1972; 1976; 1980; 1984; 1988; 1992; 1996; 2000; 2004; 2008; 2012; 2016; 2020; 2024

Australia competed at the 2004 Summer Paralympics in Athens, Greece. It was Australia's 12th year of participation at the Paralympics. The team included 151 athletes (91 men and 60 women). Australian competitors won 101 medals (26 gold, 39 silver and 36 bronze) to finish fifth in the gold medal table and second on the total medal table. Australia competed in 12 sports and won medals in 8 sports. The Chef de Mission was Paul Bird. The Australian team was smaller than the Sydney Games due to a strict selection policy related to the athletes' potential to win a medal and the International Paralympic Committee's decision to remove events for athletes with an intellectual disability from the Games due to issues of cheating at the Sydney Games. This was due to a cheating scandal with the Spanish intellectually disabled basketball team in the 2000 Summer Paralympics where it was later discovered that only two players actually had intellectual disabilities. The IPC decision resulted in leading Australian athletes such as Siobhan Paton and Lisa Llorens not being able to defend their Paralympic titles. The 2000 Summer Paralympic Games hosted in Sydney Australia proved to be a milestone for the Australian team as they finished first on the medal tally for the first time in history. In comparing Australia's 2000 Paralympic performance and their 2004 performance, it is suggested that having a home advantage might affect performance.

== Outstanding performers ==
- Swimmer Matthew Cowdrey at age 15, was the youngest member of the Australian Paralympic Team, and at his first Paralympic Games he won three gold, two silver and two bronze medals, and finished the meet with two World & Paralympic Record times. His amazing achievements were recognised and he received the Medal of the Order of Australia, were named Young Paralympian of the Year at the Australian Paralympian of the Year Awards and Swimmer of the Year with a Disability by Swimming Australia.
- Swimmer Chantel Wolfenden, also in her first ever Paralympic Games, won gold, silver and four bronze during the games while also setting a new personal record in the 400m Freestyle. For her great accomplishments she received the Medal of the Order of Australia
- Prue Watt, another first time Paralympian swimmer, established herself as one of the most successful Australian athletes during the 2004 Games, winning five silver medals and one bronze medal. To honor her accomplishments she was awarded the 2004 Female Junior Paralympian of the Year for her achievements
- Tim Sullivan won four gold medals in athletics sprints events, three of which were individual and two of which involved new world records. To celebrate his amazing achievements, he was named Australian Paralympian of the Year by the Australian Paralympic Committee [APC], and won the Victorian Institute of Sport's [VIS] Athlete with a Disability Award
- Ben Austin won four individual medals as a swimmer, one gold, two silver and one bronze. He was also part of the 4 × 100 m Freestyle Relay team and 4 × 100 m Medley Relay where they won silver and gold In the 100m freestyle he became one of the first ever swimmers in the S8 category to break the one minute barrier. For his accomplishments at the 2004 Games he received the Medal of the Order of Australia
- Cyclist Lindy Hou qualified for her first Paralympic Games in 2004 with pilots Janelle Lindsay and Toireasa Gallagher. The Games became a huge success and she won a total of four medals, one gold, two silver and one bronze. She and Janelle Lindsey also became the first Australian female athletes to win gold during the 2004 Paralympic games. They also set the world record in the Women's 200m Fly with the time 11.675 seconds. Her accomplishments were celebrated with the Medal of the Order of Australia
- Heath Francis won two individual silver medals and one bronze medal. He was also part of the Men's 4 × 400 m T42-T46 relay team and Men's 4 × 100 m T42-T46 where they won silver and bronze.

Some of the other outstanding Australian athletes included:

- Six athletes won three medals - Don Elgin, Neil Fuller, Kurt Fearnley and Darren Thrupp in athletics and Kieran Modra and Christopher Scott in cycling.

== Background of the Athens Games ==
The 2004 Summer Paralympics, formally known as Games of the XXVIII Olympiad, was held from September 17 to September 28. The twelfth Paralympic Games, a total of 3,808 competitors (2,643 Men and 1,165 Women) from 135 countries participated. During these games 304 World Records were broken with 448 Paralympic Games Records being broken across 19 different sports. Addition of judo and sitting volleyball for women and football 5-a-side for men were included. The ticket sale for event saw a decrease in tickets sold, with about 850.000 tickets for the different competitions compared to 1.2 million sold at the 2000 Sydney games. The event was made possible through the help of 8,863 volunteers

== Opening and closing ceremony ==
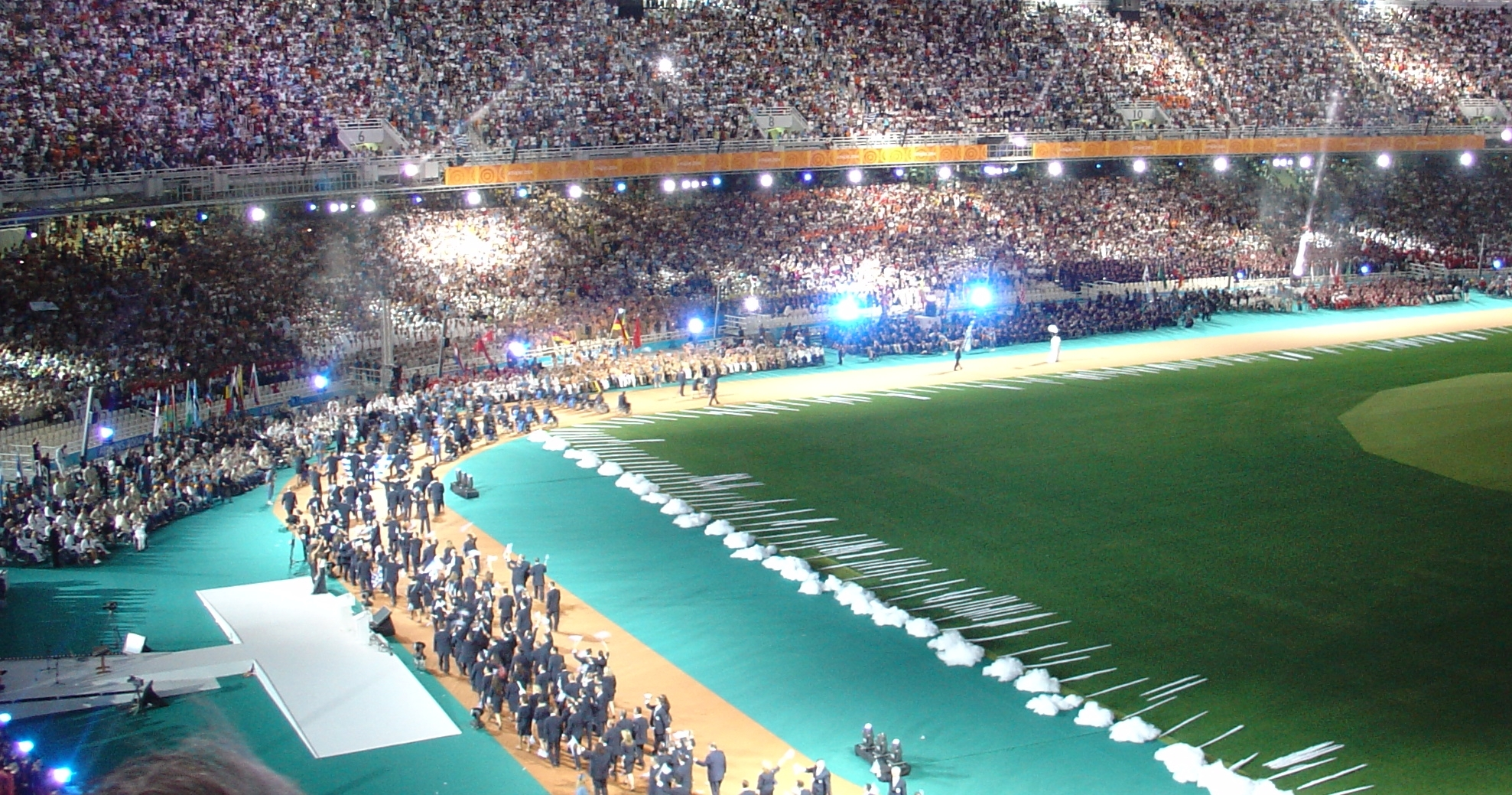
From the Paralympics opening ceremony

Louise Sauvage, a nine-time Paralympic gold medalist, lit the cauldron during the opening ceremonies for the 2000 Summer Paralympics in Sydney. On September 17, 2004, Sauvage carried the Australian flag into the opening ceremony stadium, "Spyridon Louis", at what was her 4th Paralympic games. She has a Sydney ferry, a street and a pathway named after her, as well as numerous school sport houses around Australia. After the parade of nations, the Games were declared opened by IPC President Sir Philip Craven and Greek president Cistis Stephanopoulos, before the Paralympic flame was lit by Georgios Toptsis. The opening ceremony was seen by 72,000 spectators in the stadium

Swimmer Matthew Cowdrey, recognized for his achievements during the games, was chosen to carry the Australia flag at the Closing Ceremony of the Games. The closing ceremony during the 2004 games was cut short and only entailed the protocol segments required to complete the Games, due to a tragic accident involving the deaths of seven high school students on their way to the Games. One minute of silence in tribute to the school students were held as the Paralympic flag flew half-mast. Australian gold medalist, Katrina Webb, who were critical of the Paralympic Organizers who removed the party element of the closing ceremony and thus leaving only the athletes' entry, the Paralympic President Phil Craven's speech and the handover of the flag to Beijing, said "Things like this happen, you can't stop everything. Life goes on. We should make sure we pay our respects in that regard but things should continue as they were."

The closing ceremony ended with the unveiling of the IPC's new logo

== Factors affecting Australia's performance ==
In 2000, Australia hosted both the Olympic and the Paralympic games with the Australian team's performance, more specifically the summer Paralympic team, being remarkable. For the first time in history, Australia placed first on the total medal tally for the summer Paralympics, with a total of 314 medals. This result was studied in the relation to the possibility of athletes having a home advantage, measured using a 'market share', which is measured by dividing the number of total medals won (with gold being 3 points, silver equating to 2 points and bronze being 1 point) by the total number of medals contested at the Paralympic games. In the 2000 games, the Australian team presented a home market share of 9.50%. At the 1996 US Paralympic games prior, Australia's market share was 7.27% and in the 2004 Athens Paralympics, it was 6.15%. It is proposed that there was only a home advantage for a few sports which included athletics, table tennis and wheelchair fencing. An investigation into whether there is a correlation between being communist country and sporting performance verses being a capitalist country and sporting performance was also launched. It has been argued that in communist regimes, a higher amount of resources is allocated to the sports as "communist countries use success in top-level sports to display the benefits of their political system" as well as exhibiting their "internal political stability".

It should also be noted that there are multiple socioeconomic determinants that contribute to a country's performance at the summer Paralympics. Inevitably, success of a country is randomly distributed at the Paralympics. An investigation into these contributing factors has been launched. "While some countries dominate a particular sport discipline, other countries have elite athletes in various sports, or have little or no success in sports at all". It has been proposed that countries that are more economically prosperous than others and have subsequently higher success rates across all sports. These countries are able to invest more resources into top-level sports as well as investing more effort into ensuring they have a healthy population to enable maximum sporting performance. Research has also been conducted on communist countries as it has been proposed that these nations utilise their success in top-level sports to exhibit the benefits of their political system. Expenditure on health and population size both also have a positive correlation on a country's sporting performance. "This reflects a basic law of large numbers in the sense that larger populations will…have more talented athletes". Carrying on, the degree to which a nation supports the integration of a disabled person into the sporting world, is also positively correlated to the nation's success at the Paralympics. The more accommodating and understanding a country is in relation to ensuring disabled individuals have equal access to facilities and services, the increased feelings of inclusive and thus desire to represent their country in sport. Thus, the size of the countries Paralympic team reflects how much political priority is given to support their disabled athletes.

Another factor that affected Australia's performance was the introduction of technological advances that assisted Paralympic athletes in their performance. Prosthetic and wheelchair technology are necessities for citizens with disabilities to conduct their day-to-day activities. However, application of certain technology into the sporting world can prove controversial and be unfair. It has been conducted through research that in the 2008 Beijing games, some track and field athletes in both the Paralympic and Olympic games wore clothing with a specific type of material that provided an unfair advantage. The clothing was manufactured by Nike and contained threads of vectran fibre which was found to "reduce drag by 7% when compared with the 2004 outfits". Thus, it can be argued that some technological advancements that were utilised in the 2004 Paralympic games provided an unfair advantage amongst other participants including Australian parathletes.

== Australia's past performance ==
As hosts of the 2000 Olympic and the Paralympic games, the Australian population had high expectations for the Australian athletes in these games. Notably, this was the first Paralympic games ever to be hosted in the Southern hemisphere. Overall, the 2000 Paralympic games attracted 3,879 para athletes, 285 being Australian para athletes. This was 120 more para athletes than the 1996 Atlanta Paralympic team and 134 more than 2004 Athens Paralympic team. The Paralympic games saw 122 nations compete across 18 sports. In total, the Australian team comprised 30 intellectually disabled athletes, which at the time, was the largest number the team had ever had. Overall, there were 20 multiple gold medallists in the team. One notable athlete is Siobhan Paton, a Paralympic swimmer with an intellectual disability, who won the most gold medals than any other Australian in the 2000 games, coming away with 6 in total. However, in the 2004 games she was unable to uphold these titles due to the temporary banning of intellectually disabled athletes.

== Development and preparation ==
The 2004 Olympics and Paralympics was the largest event Athens had ever hosted and thus, it was paramount that the games ran safely and timely. This required thorough planning to ensure the games operated smoothly and problem free. Large consideration for how the large number of participants, coaches, visitors, workers, volunteers were all going to gather in a relatively small geographic area was needed as ensuring their safety was of number one priority. The Olympic Planning Unit (OPU) played a crucial part in the planning of these games as they decided what was lacking and therefore needed of local public health agencies, identified possible health risks that could be exposed to the public and worked collaboratively with other government agencies. Inevitably, international travel is associated with public health risks such as increased accidents and increased overall morbidity. The Greek government accounted for the possibility of new diseases that were previously not endemic to the city of Athens being imported due to the increase in tourists and travellers. As a precaution, the Greek health authorities sorted possible diseases into non-infectious and infectious disease and then categorised in terms of their probability of occurring as their high or low priority.

With 7,000 people expected to attend these Paralympic games, it was recognised that delivery of food was of large concern and importance. The Organising committee for the Olympic games established that there was to be 3 main restaurants situated within the Olympic village for participants. Overall, 250 chefs and 250 assistants were employed to ensure the smooth preparation of around 50,000 expected daily meals to fed the village residents. Continuing on, multiple catering companies and outdoor vendors were hired to offer meals around the various Paralympic venues.

Another concern that was raised in the preparation of the games was the high possibility of the transmission of airborne viruses particularly within indoor venues. More specifically, influenza was of main concern as a considerable portion of athletes and visitors were arriving from the southern hemisphere, including Australians, where it is highly prevalent. An evaluation of non-infectious illnesses such as heat illness was assessed. This was regarded as high importance as heat was a major issue in the 1996 Atlanta games which saw high levels of humidity and temperatures. The elected venues for the games such as the hotels, swimming pools and toilets underwent inspections 2 years prior to the commencement of the games and from there, were checked on a regular basis up until September 2004 when the Paralympic games closed. However, upon post-event analysis of the games, it was proposed that the relatively low number of visitors may partly be due to the international political position. Overall, the extensive planning conducted prior and during the games proved paramount for the access of both the Olympic and Paralympic games.

Counter terrorism efforts were also made as attention to this was catalysed from the 1996 Atlanta games. 111 people were injured from an exploding bomb during these games.

== Sport-specific criteria ==
During the 2000 summer Paralympic games, a cheating scandal took place with the Spanish basketball team. Gold medals were awarded to 10 members of the team which was revoked later in the same year when it was uncovered that 10 out of the 12 members on the team had intellectual disabilities. This scandal lead to the implementation of a more thorough and objective criteria that Paralympic athletes must meet prior to their participation in the games. Working cooperatively, the International Sports Federation for Para-athletes with an Intellectual Disability (INAS-ID) and the International Paralympic committee (IPC) established a rigid criterion for selection to combat future cheating and scandals. The first process that athletes must go through is ensuring all competitors claiming to have an impairment of their intellectual functioning, must fit the primary eligibility criteria set out by the American Association on Intellectual and developmental disability's (AAIDD) definition of having an intellectual disability. According to the AAIDD, they propose that "Intellectual disability is a disability characterized by significant limitation both in intellectual functioning and in adaptive behaviour as expressed in conceptual, social, and practical adaptive skills…this disability originates before the age of 18". Continuing on, it has been established that receiving an IQ below 75, indicates significant impairment in intellectual functioning. Athletes must also exhibit performance that is at a minimum of 2 standard deviations below the mean on a measure that has been standardised within one or more of the 3 categories of adaptive behaviours; practical, conceptual or practical skills. This new criteria for the selection of the athletes was not implemented in time for the 2004 games, meaning certain athletes were unable to defend their Olympic title such as Australian swimmer Siobhan Paton and Track athlete Lisa Llorens.

In the 2000 Summer Sydney Paralympic games, Siobhan Paton acquired a total of 6 gold medals and set 9 world records whilst doing so. She was also named "Paralympian of the Year" by the Australian Paralympic Committee. In 2004, she also competed in the INAS-FID (International Sports federation for people with an intellectual disability) world championships where she won a total of 14 gold medals and 3 silver medals. She also completed in the Global games later on in the same year where, unsurprisingly, won 3 gold medals, two silver and 2 bronze. Track athlete Lisa Llorens specialised in high jumping, long jumping and sprinting. In the 2000 Summer Sydney Paralympic games, she won 3 gold medals, in. the 200 metre sprint, high jump and long jump whilst also receiving a silver medal in the 100 metre sprint. Astonishingly, she also broke the long jump world record 3 times. She was also granted the opportunities to carry the Paralympic torch into the Stadium for the 2000 Sydney games, to which she did so with great pride

These Paralympic athletes were unable to defend their titles due to the International Paralympic committee's decision to eliminate events for athletes with intellectual disabilities. Unfortunately, this IPC decision caused Paton to fall into depression as she felt she didn't not meet the disability requirements anymore. It wasn't until after the 2008 Paralympic games, that a specific and rigorous criterion had been created, and thus the ban had been lifted for intellectually disabled athletes'.

== Media coverage ==
The 2000 Summer Paralympics in Sydney had the most comprehensive media coverage; and highest TV ratings ever experienced by a Paralympic Games for its time laying down the solid foundations for media surround the 2004 Summer Paralympics in Australia. The Athens Paralympics saw record media attendance with a total of 3,103 media representatives, including more than 66 broadcasters. The Paralympics were shown in 49 countries in addition to being broadcast worldwide via Eurosport and Reuters. A study of the broadcast coverage revealed approximately 1.86 billion viewers in total, distributed on 617 hours of coverage. The increase in media attendance is thought be attributed to the introduction of 5-a-side Football. The development in media attendance and coverage confirms that the media's interest in the Paralympics Games Since the Sydney 2000 Paralympics has grown.

== Medal tally ==
Many analysts note that the surprising Chinese success would be a preview for the consolidation of parasport in China in view of the 2008 Summer Paralympic Games.However, the number of events compared to 4 years before in Sydney was greater than in Athens, thanks to changes in the classification of some events, the withdrawal of others and the exclusion of those with intellectual disabilities. Australia had the second highest medal tally overall, which were 16% higher than it was in 1984.

Rank	Nation	Gold	Silver	Bronze	Total
1	China	63	46	32	141
2	Great Britain	35	30	29	94
3	Canada	28	19	25	72
4	United States	27	22	39	88
5	Australia	26	39	36	101

== Medalists ==
Medal	Name	Sport	Event
Gold	Tim Sullivan	Athletics	Men's 100 m T38
Gold	Tim Sullivan	Athletics	Men's 200 m T38
Gold	Tim Sullivan	Athletics	Men's 400 m T38
Gold	Richard Colman	Athletics	Men's 800 m T53
Gold	Kurt Fearnley	Athletics	Men's 5000 m T54
Gold	Kurt Fearnley	Athletics	Men's Marathon T54
Gold	Tim Sullivan, Benjamin Hall, Darren Thrupp, Paul Benz	Athletics	Men's 4 × 100 m relay T35-T38
Gold	Amy Winters	Athletics	Women's 100 m T46
Gold	Amy Winters	Athletics	Women's 200 m T46
Gold	Katrina Webb	Athletics	Women's 400 m T38
Gold	Christopher Scott	Cycling	Men's bicycle road race/time trial CP4
Gold	Christopher Scott	Cycling	Men's bicycle 3 km individual pursuit CP4
Gold	Mark le Flohic	Cycling	Men's tricycle road race CP 1/2
Gold	Greg Ball	Cycling	Men's bicycle 1 km time trial LC 1-4
Gold	Anthony Biddle, Kial Stewart	Cycling	Men's tandem 1 km time trial B1-3
Gold	Peter Brooks	Cycling	Men's bicycle 4 km individual pursuit LC1
Gold	Kieran Modra, Robert Crowe	Cycling	Men's tandem 4 km individual pursuit B1-3
Gold	Kieran Modra, David Short	Cycling	Men's tandem sprint B1-3
Gold	Greg Ball, Peter Brooks, Christopher Scott	Cycling	Men's bicycle team sprint LC 1-4&CP 3/4
Gold	Lindy Hou, Janelle Lindsay	Cycling	Women's tandem sprint B 1-3
Gold	Ben Austin	Swimming	Men's 100 m freestyle S8
Gold	Matthew Cowdrey	Swimming	Men's 100 m freestyle S9
Gold	Matthew Cowdrey	Swimming	Men's 200 m individual medley SM9
Gold	Rod Welsh, Daniel Bell, Ben Austin, Alex Harris	Swimming	Men's 4 × 100 m medley relay 34 pts
Gold	Chantel Wolfenden	Swimming	Women's 400 m freestyle S7
Gold	Sarah Bowen	Swimming	Women's 100 m breaststroke SB6
Silver	Heath Francis	Athletics	Men's 100 m T46
Silver	Heath Francis	Athletics	Men's 400 m T46
Silver	Neil Fuller	Athletics	Men's 400 m T44
Silver	Roy Daniell	Athletics	Men's Marathon T13
Silver	Richard Colman, Richard Nicholson, Kurt Fearnley, Geoff Trappett	Athletics	Men's 4 × 100 m relay T53/T54
Silver	Neil Fuller, Don Elgin, Heath Francis, Stephen Wilson	Athletics	Men's 4 × 400 m relay T42-T46
Silver	Hamish MacDonald	Athletics	Men's Shot put F33/34
Silver	Kieran Ault-Connell	Athletics	Men's Javelin throw F37
Silver	Lisa McIntosh	Athletics	Women's 200 m T37
Silver	Louise Sauvage	Athletics	Women's 400 m T54
Silver	Amanda Fraser	Athletics	Women's Discus throw F37
Silver	Peter Homann	Cycling	Men's bicycle road race/time trial CP4
Silver	Mark le Flohic	Cycling	Men's tricycle time trial CP1/2
Silver	Claire McLean	Cycling	Women's bicycle time trial LC 1-4&CP 3/4
Silver	Lindy Hou, Toireasa Ryan	Cycling	Women's tandem road race/time trial B1-3
Silver	Andrew Panazzolo	Cycling	Men's bicycle 1 km time trial CP3/4
Silver	Peter Homann	Cycling	Men's bicycle 3 km individual pursuit CP4
Silver	Lindy Hou, Toireasa Ryan	Cycling	Women's tandem 3 km individual pursuit B1-3
Silver	Jan Pike on Dr Doolittle	Equestrian	Individual championship dressage GI
Silver	Darren Gardiner	Powerlifting	Men's +100 kg
Silver	Ashley Adams	Shooting	Mixed free rifle prone SH1
Silver	Ben Austin	Swimming	Men's 100 m butterfly S8
Silver	Matthew Cowdrey	Swimming	Men's 100 m butterfly S8
Silver	Daniel Bell	Swimming	Men's 100 m butterfly S10
Silver	Daniel Bell	Swimming	Men's 100 m breaststroke SB9
Silver	Ben Austin	Swimming	Men's 200 m individual medley SM8
Silver	Rod Welsh	Swimming	Men's 200 m individual medley SM10
Silver	Rod Welsh Ben Austin, Alex Harris, Matthew Cowdrey	Swimming	Men's 4 × 100 m freestyle relay 34 pts
Silver	Prue Watt	Swimming	Women's 50 m freestyle S13
Silver	Chantel Wolfenden	Swimming	Women's 100 m freestyle S7
Silver	Prue Watt	Swimming	Women's 100 m freestyle S13
Silver	Lichelle Clarke	Swimming	Women's 400 m freestyle S8
Silver	Prue Watt	Swimming	Women's 400 m freestyle S13
Silver	Prue Watt	Swimming	Women's 100 m butterfly S13
Silver	Prue Watt	Swimming	Women's 200 m individual medley SM13
Silver	Australia men's national wheelchair basketball team: Brendan Dowler; Justin Eveson; Andrew Flavel; Adrian King; Tristan Knowles; Campbell Message; Grant Mizens; Brad Ness; Shaun Norris; Troy Sachs; David Selby; Daryl Taylor	Wheelchair Basketball	Men's tournament
Silver	Australia women's national wheelchair basketball team: Lisa Chaffey; Shelley Chaplin; Paula Coghlan; Melanie Domaschenz; Karen Farrell; Kylie Gauci; Tina McKenzie; Alison Mosely; Jane Sachs; Sarah Stewart; Liesl Tesch; Melinda Young	Wheelchair Basketball	Women's tournament
Silver	David Hall	Wheelchair tennis	Men's singles
Bronze	Darren Thrupp	Athletics	Men's 100 m T37
Bronze	Heath Francis	Athletics	Men's 200 m T46
Bronze	Don Elgin, Neil Fuller, Stephen Wilson, Heath Francis	Athletics	Men's 4 × 100 m relay T42-T46
Bronze	Darren Thrupp	Athletics	Men's Long jump F36-38
Bronze	Russell Short	Athletics	Men's Shot put F13
Bronze	Nicholas Larionow	Athletics	Men's Shot put F36
Bronze	Don Elgin	Athletics	Men's Pentathlon P44
Bronze	Lisa McIntosh	Athletics	Women's 100 m T37
Bronze	Angie Ballard	Athletics	Women's 100 m T53
Bronze	Jodi Willis	Athletics	Women's Shot Put F12
Bronze	Peter Brooks	Cycling	Men's bicycle road race/time trial LC1
Bronze	Kieran Modra, Robert Crowe	Cycling	Men's tandem road race/time trial B1-3
Bronze	Kelly McCombie, Janet Shaw	Cycling	Women's tandem road race/time trial B1-3
Bronze	Andrew Panazzolo	Cycling	Men's bicycle 3 km individual pursuit CP3
Bronze	Anthony Biddle, Kial Stewart	Cycling	Men's tandem sprint B1-3
Bronze	Lindy Hou, Janelle Lindsay	Cycling	Women's tandem 1 km time trial B1-3
Bronze	Kelly McCombie, Janet Shaw	Cycling	Women's tandem 3 km individual pursuit B1-3
Bronze	Jan Pike on Dr Doolittle	Equestrian	Individual freestyle dressage GI
Bronze	Ashley Adams	Shooting	Men's air rifle standing SH1
Bronze	Ben Austin	Swimming	Men's 50 m freestyle S8
Bronze	Matthew Cowdrey	Swimming	Men's 50 m freestyle S9
Bronze	Ricardo Moffatti	Swimming	Men's 100 m freestyle S8
Bronze	Matthew Cowdrey	Swimming	Men's 400 m freestyle S9
Bronze	Rod Welsh	Swimming	Men's 100 m backstroke S10
Bronze	Sarah Rose	Swimming	Women's 50 m butterfly S6
Bronze	Kate Bailey	Swimming	Women's 100 m butterfly S9
Bronze	Marayke Jonkers	Swimming	Women's 50 m breaststroke SB3
Bronze	Marayke Jonkers	Swimming	Women's 150 m individual medley SM4
Bronze	Prue Watt	Swimming	Women's 100 m breaststroke SB13
Bronze	Chantel Wolfenden	Swimming	Women's 100 m backstroke S7
Bronze	Chantel Wolfenden	Swimming	Women's 200 m individual medley SM7
Bronze	Mandy Drennan, Chantel Wolfenden, Lichelle Clarke, Kat Lewis	Swimming	Women's 4 × 100 m freestyle relay 34 pts
Bronze	Hannah MacDougall, Brooke Stockham, Kate Bailey, Chantel Wolfenden	Swimming	Women's 4 × 100 m medley relay 34 pts
Bronze	Sam Bramham	Swimming	Men's 100 m butterfly S9
Bronze	David Hall, Anthony Bonaccurso	Wheelchair tennis	Men's doubles
Bronze	Daniela Di Toro	Wheelchair tennis	Women's singles

Medals by discipline
Discipline	Gold medal	Silver medal	Bronze medal	Total
Archery	0	0	0	0
Athletics	10	12	10	32
Wheelchair basketball	0	2	0	2
Boccia	0	0	0	0
Cycling	10	7	7	24
Equestrian	0	1	1	2
Judo	0	0	0	0
Powerlifting	0	1	0	1
Wheelchair rugby	0	0	0	0
Sailing	0	0	0	0
Shooting	0	1	1	2
Swimming	6	14	15	35
Wheelchair tennis	0	1	2	3
Total	26	39	36	101

== Events ==
=== Archery ===
Officials - Vicki O'Brien (Manager)

Athlete	Event	Ranking round		Round of 32	Round of 16	Quarterfinals	Semifinals	Finals	
Athlete	Event	Score	Seed	Opposition score	Opposition score	Opposition score	Opposition score	Opposition score	Rank
Natalie Cordowiner	Women's individual standing	505	15	N/A	Wang (CHN); L 126-136	did not advance			

=== Athletics ===
After finishing number one in athletics at the 2000 Summer Paralympic Games, Australia's goal for the 2004 Games was to finish top three on the athletics medal table. Australia ended up number two in athletics, completing their best away Games ever.

==== Men's track ====
Athlete	Class	Event	Heats		Semifinal		Final	
Athlete	Class	Event	Result	Rank	Result	Rank	Result	Rank
Kieran Ault	T37	100m	12.66	7 q	N/A		12.75	7
Malcolm Bennett	T36	400m	1:02.69	8 q	N/A		1:02.95	8
Malcolm Bennett	T36	800m	DNS		did not advance			
Malcolm Bennett	T36	1500m	N/A				5:04.71	5
Paul Benz	T38	100m	12.16	7 q	N/A		12.16	7
Paul Benz	T38	200m	24.95	7 q	N/A		24.34	7
Paul Benz	T38	400m	53.82	7 q	N/A		56.35	8
Richard Colman	T53	100m	15.92	9	did not advance			
Richard Colman	T53	200m	27.42	7 q	N/A		28.12	7
Richard Colman	T53	800m	1:40.33	3 Q	N/A		1:38.68 PR	1st place, gold medalist(s)
Roy Daniell	T13	Marathon	N/A				2:42:17	2nd place, silver medalist(s)
Don Elgin	T44	100m	DNS		did not advance			
Kurt Fearnley	T54	800m	1:37.90	6 Q	N/A		1:32.73	4
Kurt Fearnley	T54	1500m	3:04.77	10 Q	3:08.62	9 Q	3:05.79	4
Kurt Fearnley	T54	5000m	10:24.54	2 Q	N/A		10:23.98 PR	1st place, gold medalist(s)
Kurt Fearnley	T54	Marathon	N/A				1:25:37	1st place, gold medalist(s)
Heath Francis	T46	100m	11.21	5 Q	N/A		11.09	2nd place, silver medalist(s)
Heath Francis	T46	200m	22.39	2 Q	N/A		22.73	3rd place, bronze medalist(s)
Heath Francis	T46	400m	52.12	3 Q	N/A		48.72	2nd place, silver medalist(s)
Neil Fuller	T44	100m	DNS		did not advance			
Neil Fuller	T44	200m	24.28	5 Q	N/A		23.45	5
Neil Fuller	T44	400m	54.21	3 Q	N/A		53.15	2nd place, silver medalist(s)
Benjamin Hall	T37	200m	26.10	7 q	N/A		26.37	8
Benjamin Hall	T37	400m	N/A				59.41	7
Paul Harpur	T11	200m	24.92	17	did not advance			
Paul Harpur	T11	400m	54.31	7 Q	55.74	7	54.50	7
Lachlan Jones	T52	200m	34.30	8 q	N/A		33.89	7
Lachlan Jones	T52	800m	2:05.42	4 q	N/A		2:10.75	7
Lachlan Jones	T52	1500m	4:08.80	10 q	N/A		3:59.15	5
John Lindsay	T53	100m	16.12	14	did not advance			
John Lindsay	T53	200m	28.18	15	did not advance			
Tim Matthews	T46	100m	16.44	14	did not advance			
Richard Nicholson	T54	100m	15.05	13 q	15.33	15	did not advance	
Paul Nunnari	T54	1500m	3:06.53	14	did not advance			
Paul Nunnari	T54	5000m	11:08.42	23	did not advance			
Paul Nunnari	T54	10000m	23:44.16	23	did not advance			
Paul Nunnari	T54	Marathon	N/A				1:43.16	19
Frederic Periac	T54	800m	1:42.32	21	did not advance			
Frederic Periac	T54	1500m	3:10.62	29	did not advance			
Tim Sullivan	T38	100m	11.63	1 Q	N/A		11.37 WR	1st place, gold medalist(s)
Tim Sullivan	T38	200m	23.68	1 Q	N/A		22.92 WR	1st place, gold medalist(s)
Tim Sullivan	T38	400m	51.42	1 Q	N/A		51.41	1st place, gold medalist(s)
Darren Thrupp	T37	100m	12.44	5 Q	N/A		12.52	3rd place, bronze medalist(s)
Geoff Trappett	T54	100m	14.87	7 q	14.91	7 Q	15.00	6
Geoff Trappett	T54	200m	26.56	11	did not advance			
Stephen Wilson	T44	200m	24.42	6 Q	N/A		23.75	7
Stephen Wilson	T44	400m	56.19	7 q	N/A		53.98	4
Paul Benz; Darren Thrupp; Benjamin Hall; Tim Sullivan	T35-38	4 × 100 m relay	N/A				46.73 WR	1st place, gold medalist(s)
Paul Benz; Darren Thrupp; Benjamin Hall; Tim Sullivan	T35-38	4 × 400 m relay	N/A				DNF	
Heath Francis; Stephen Wilson; Neil Fuller; Don Elgin	T42-46	4 × 100 m relay	N/A				44.03	3rd place, bronze medalist(s)
Heath Francis; Stephen Wilson; Neil Fuller; Don Elgin	T42-46	4 × 400 m relay	N/A				3:33.55	2nd place, silver medalist(s)
Richard Colman; Richard Nicholson; Kurt Fearnley; Geoff Trappett	T53-54	4 × 100 m relay	53.51	3 Q	N/A		52.10	2nd place, silver medalist(s)
Richard Colman; Frederic Periac; Richard Nicholson; Kurt Fearnley	T53-54	4 × 400 m relay	3:19.10	5	did not advance			

==== Men's field ====
Athlete	Class	Event	Final		
Athlete	Class	Event	Result	Points	Rank
Kieran Ault	F37	Javelin	45.77	-	2nd place, silver medalist(s)
Damien Burroughs	F37	Discus	42.44	-	5
Damien Burroughs	F37	Javelin	30.56	-	8
Damien Burroughs	F37	Shot put	10.78	-	6
Don Elgin	F44/46	Discus	41.13	822	7
Don Elgin	F44/46	Shot put	12.19	839	12
Don Elgin	P44	Pentathlon	4152		3rd place, bronze medalist(s)
Rodney Farr	F52	Discus	15.08	-	6
Rodney Farr	F52	Shot put	8.19	-	5
Rodney Farr	F52-53	Javelin	14.58	912	9
Brian Harvey	F36/38	Javelin	37.39	-	8
Brian Harvey	F38	Discus	28.71	-	8
Brian Harvey	F38	Shot put	9.61	-	9
Nicholas Larionow	F36	Discus	27.92	-	7
Nicholas Larionow	F36	Shot put	11.17	-	3rd place, bronze medalist(s)
Hamish MacDonald	F33-34	Discus	29.23	871	6
Hamish MacDonald	F33-34	Shot put	11.16 WR	1056	2nd place, silver medalist(s)
Richard Nicholson	P54-58	Pentathlon	4662		10
Russell Short	F12	Discus	42.54	-	5
Russell Short	F13	Shot put	15.54	-	3rd place, bronze medalist(s)
Darren Thrupp	F36-38	Long jump	5.98	1033	3rd place, bronze medalist(s)
Bruce Wallrodt	F54	Javelin	24.25	-	5
Bruce Wallrodt	F54	Shot put	8.63	-	5

==== Women's track ====
Athlete	Class	Event	Heats		Final	
Athlete	Class	Event	Result	Rank	Result	Rank
Angela Ballard	T53	100m	N/A		17.87	3rd place, bronze medalist(s)
Angela Ballard	T53	200m	33.14	11	did not advance	
Angela Ballard	T53	400m	1:03.01	8 q	1:02.73	7
Angela Ballard	T53	800m	2:08.81	7 Q	2:02.29	5
Gemma Buchholz	T52	200m	42.15	5 q	43.81	6
Gemma Buchholz	T52	400m	1:26.26	7 q	1:22.67	5
Christie Dawes	T54	800m	1:54.24	7 Q	1:52.51	6
Christie Dawes	T54	1500m	3:38.60	10 q	3:29.50	6
Christie Dawes	T54	5000m	12:00.07	3	12:50.86	10
Christie Dawes	T54	Marathon	N/A		2:08.25	9
Amanda Fraser	T37	100m	N/A		16.56	6
Lara Hollow	T13	100m	N/A		13.79	7
Lara Hollow	T13	400m	N/A		1:03.65	5
Lisa McIntosh	T37	100m	N/A		14.81	3rd place, bronze medalist(s)
Lisa McIntosh	T37	200m	N/A		30.56	2nd place, silver medalist(s)
Louise Sauvage	T54	400m	N/A			2nd place, silver medalist(s)
Louise Sauvage	T54	800m	1:53.27	1 Q	1:50.88	2nd place, silver medalist(s)
Eliza Stankovic	T54	200m	31.58	7 Q	31.36	7
Eliza Stankovic	T54	800m	1:53.78	6 Q	1:52.79	7
Eliza Stankovic	T54	1500m	3:36.63	3 Q	3:28.66	4
Eliza Stankovic	T54	5000m	12:21.08	8 Q	12:18.46	7
Katrina Webb	T38	400m	N/A		1:05.41 PR	1st place, gold medalist(s)
Amy Winters	T46	100m	12.64	1 Q	12.50 PR	1st place, gold medalist(s)
Amy Winters	T46	200m	25.77	2 Q	25.54 WR	1st place, gold medalist(s)

==== Women's field ====
Athlete	Class	Event	Final		
Athlete	Class	Event	Result	Points	Rank
Joanne Bradshaw	F37	Discus	20.17	708	9
Joanne Bradshaw	F37/38	Shot put	8.60	933	7
Amanda Fraser	F37	Discus	26.30	701	2nd place, silver medalist(s)
Amanda Fraser	F37/38	Shot put	7.76	842	11
Louise Ellery	F32-34/52/53	Discus	NMR		
Louise Ellery	F32-34/52/53	Shot put	4.93	1100	6
Julie Iles	F40	Discus	15.90	-	6
Julie Iles	F40	Javelin	13.49	-	6
Julie Iles	F40	Shot put	4.79	-	9
Katrina Webb	F35-38	Javelin	28.47 WR	1223	4
Debbie Wendt	F35-38	Javelin	18.77	846	12
Debbie Wendt	F37	Discus	22.51	705	6
Jodi Willis	F12	Discus	36.67	-	4
Jodi Willis	F12	Shot put	11.95	-	3rd place, bronze medalist(s)

Coaches - Scott Goodman (Head), Paul Angel, Richard Bednall, Andrew Dawes, Iryna Dvoskina, John Eden, Brett Jones, Gary Lees, Alison O'Riordan

Officials - Andrew Faichney (Manager), Louise Mogg, Paul Rohwer, Greg Jones, Jodie Carey

=== Cycling ===
Australia were top of the medal table in cycling.

==== Men's road race ====
Athlete	Event	Time	Rank
Anthony Biddle; Kial Stewart (pilot)	Tandem road race / time trial B1-3	-	22
Kieran Modra; Robert Crowe (pilot)	Tandem road race / time trial B1-3	-	3rd place, bronze medalist(s)
Greg Ball	Road race / time trial LC4	1:36:32	5
Peter Brooks	Road race / time trial LC1	-	3rd place, bronze medalist(s)
Mark le Flohic	Tricycle road race CP div 1/2	46:53	1st place, gold medalist(s)
Mark le Flohic	Tricycle time trial CP div 1/2	10:06.84	2nd place, silver medalist(s)
Peter Homann	Road race / time trial CP div 4	-	2nd place, silver medalist(s)
Andrew Panazzolo	Road race / time trial CP div 3	1:20:18	6
Christopher Scott	Road race / time trial CP div 4	-	1st place, gold medalist(s)

==== Men's track cycling (pairs / teams) ====
Athlete	Event	Ranking Round		Quarterfinals		Semifinals		Final	
Athlete	Event	Time	Rank	Time	Rank	Time	Rank	Opposition Time	Rank
Anthony Biddle; Kial Stewart (pilot)	1km time trial tandem B1-3	N/A						1:05.14	1st place, gold medalist(s)
Anthony Biddle; Kial Stewart (pilot)	Sprint tandem B1-3	10.800	2 Q	Janowski (FRA); Senmartin (FRA)	W 11.160	Janovjak (SVK); Petrovic (SVK)	L 1 - 2	Yoshihara (JPN); Oki (JPN); L 1 - 2	4
Kieran Modra; Robert Crowe (pilot)	Individual pursuit tandem B1-3	4:21.45 WR	1 Q	N/A		Solem (CAN); Cowie (CAN)	W OVL	Mulder (NED); Schoots (NED); W 4:23.87	1st place, gold medalist(s)
Kieran Modra; David Short (pilot)	1km time trial tandem B1-3	N/A						1:06.94	7
Kieran Modra; David Short (pilot)	Sprint tandem B1-3	10.771 WR	1 Q	Oshiro (JPN); Tanzawa (JPN)	W 2 - 0	Yoshihara (JPN); Oki (JPN)	W 2 - 0	Janovjak (SVK); Petrovic (SVK); W W/O	1st place, gold medalist(s)
Greg Ball; Peter Brooks; Peter Homann; Christopher Scott	Team sprint LC1-4 / CP 3/4	53.310	1 Q	N/A		Canada (CAN)	W 53.874	United States (USA); W 53.968	1st place, gold medalist(s)

==== Men's track cycling (individual) ====
Athlete	Event	Qualification		Final	
Athlete	Event	Time	Rank	Opposition Time	Rank
Greg Ball	1km time trial LC1-4	N/A		1:07.67 WR	1st place, gold medalist(s)
Peter Brooks	1km time trial LC1-4	N/A		1:10.25	5
Peter Brooks	Individual pursuit LC1	4:52.81	1 Q	Eibeck (AUT); W 4:52.48	1st place, gold medalist(s)
Peter Homann	Individual pursuit CP div 4	3:43.32	2 Q	Scott (AUS); L 3:41.44	2nd place, silver medalist(s)
Andrew Panazzolo	1km time trial CP div 3/4	N/A		1:10.22	2nd place, silver medalist(s)
Andrew Panazzolo	Individual pursuit CP div 3	4:06.52	3 q	Eckhard (ESP); W 3:58.87	3rd place, bronze medalist(s)
Christopher Scott	1km time trial CP div 3/4	N/A		1:11.67	4
Christopher Scott	Individual pursuit CP div 4	3:35.37 PR	1 Q	Homann (AUS); W 3:32.96 WR	1st place, gold medalist(s)

==== Women's road race ====
Athlete	Event	Time	Rank
Lindy Hou; Toireasa Ryan (pilot)	Tandem road race / time trial B1-3	-	2nd place, silver medalist(s)
Lyn Lepore; Janelle Lindsay (pilot)	Tandem road race / time trial B1-3	-	9
Janet Shaw; Kelly McCombie (pilot)	Tandem road race / time trial B1-3	1:57:20	3rd place, bronze medalist(s)
Claire McLean	Time trial LC1-4/CP 3/4	27:39.95	2nd place, silver medalist(s)

==== Women's track cycling ====
Athlete	Event	Qualification		Semifinals		Final	
Athlete	Event	Time	Rank	Time	Rank	Opposition Time	Rank
Lindy Hou; Janelle Lindsay (pilot)	1km time trial tandem B1-3	N/A				1:11.78	3rd place, bronze medalist(s)
Lindy Hou; Janelle Lindsay (pilot)	Sprint tandem B1-3	11.675 WR	1 Q	MacPherson (AUS); Lepore (AUS)	W 2 - 0	McGlynn (GBR); Hunter (GBR); W 2 - 0	1st place, gold medalist(s)
Lyn Lepore; Jenny MacPherson (pilot)	1km time trial tandem B1-3	N/A				1:15.45	6
Lyn Lepore; Jenny MacPherson (pilot)	Sprint tandem B1-3	12.645	4 Q	Hou (AUS); Lindsay (AUS)	L 0 - 2	Whitsell (USA); Compton (USA); DNS	4
Janet Shaw; Kelly McCombie	1km time trial tandem B1-3	N/A				1:12.53	4
Claire McLean	1km time trial LC1-4 / CP 3/4	N/A				1:21.95	8

Coaches - Kevin McIntosh (Head), Darryl Benson, Andrew Budge

Officials - Elsa Lepore (Manager), John Beer, Paul Lamond

=== Equestrian ===
==== Individual ====
Athlete	Event	Total	
Athlete	Event	Score	Rank
Georgia Bruce	Individual championship test grade IV	61.419	14
Georgia Bruce	Individual freestyle test grade IV	67.000	12
Marita Hird	Individual championship test grade III	67.520	6
Marita Hird	Individual freestyle test grade III	73.389	4
Jan Pike	Individual championship test grade I	71.895	2nd place, silver medalist(s)
Jan Pike	Individual championship test grade I	74.375	3rd place, bronze medalist(s)
Anne Skinner	Individual championship test grade III	61.280	12
Anne Skinner	Individual freestyle test grade III	68.500	9

==== Mixed team ====
Athlete	Event	Total	
Athlete	Event	Score	Rank
Georgia Bruce; Marita Hird; Jan Pike; Anne Skinner	Mixed team	401.014	6

Coaches - Gillian Rickard (Head), Anne Hall

Officials - Sue Cusack (Manager), Judy Fyfe

=== Judo ===
==== Men ====
Athlete	Event	Preliminary	Quarterfinals	Semifinals	Repechage round 1	Repechage round 2	Final/ Bronze medal contest
Athlete	Event	Opposition Result	Opposition Result	Opposition Result	Opposition Result	Opposition Result	Opposition Result
Anthony Clarke	90kg	Cruz Alonso (CUB); W 1000-0000	Kretsul (RUS); L 0000–1000	N/A		Fernández (ESP); L 0000-1000	Did not advance

==== Women ====
Athlete	Event	Quarterfinals	Semifinals	Repechage round 1	Repechage round 2	Final/ Bronze medal contest
Athlete	Event	Opposition Result	Opposition Result	Opposition Result	Opposition Result	Opposition Result
Desiree Allan	52kg	Schuetzel (GER); L 0000–1000	N/A			Vlasova (RUS); L 0000-1000

Coach - Trevor Kschammer (Head), Lara Sullivan

=== Powerlifting ===
==== Men ====
Athlete	Event	Result	Rank
Darren Gardiner	+100 kg	225.0	2nd place, silver medalist(s)
Steve Green	90 kg	175.0	10
Wayne Sharpe	48 kg	125.0	9

==== Women ====
Athlete	Event	Result	Rank
Deahnne McIntyre	+82.5 kg	130.0	5

Coaches – Martin Leach (Coach), Michael Farrell

Darren Gardiner originally finished third but was awarded the silver medal after Habibollah Mousavi, gold medallist in +100 kg was disqualified after a positive doping test.

=== Sailing ===
Australia represented in sailing:
Men - Jamie Dunross, Colin Harrison, Jeff Milligan, Peter Thompson

Coaches – Lachlan Gilbert (Head), Geoff Chambers

Australia failed to win any medals in the two sailing events.

=== Shooting ===
==== Men ====
Athlete	Event	Qualification		Final		
Athlete	Event	Score	Rank	Score	Total	Rank
Ashley Adams	Mixed 10m air rifle prone SH1	598	9	did not advance		
Ashley Adams	Men's 10m air rifle standing SH1	590	3 Q	102.2	692.2	3rd place, bronze medalist(s)
Ashley Adams	Mixed 50m rifle prone SH1	595	2 Q	102.8	697.8	2nd place, silver medalist(s)
Ashley Adams	Men's 50m rifle three positions SH1	1134	6 Q	97.9	1231.9	5
James Nomarhas	Mixed 25m pistol SH1	557	10	did not advance		
Peter Worsley	Mixed 10m air rifle standing SH2	583	21	did not advance		
Peter Worsley	Mixed 10m air rifle prone SH2	591	23	did not advance		
David Ziebarth	Mixed 10m air rifle prone SH2	591	23	did not advance		

==== Women ====
Athlete	Event	Qualification		Final		
Athlete	Event	Score	Rank	Score	Total	Rank
Elizabeth Kosmala	Mixed 10m air rifle prone SH1	596	22	did not advance		
Elizabeth Kosmala	Women's 10m air rifle standing SH1	381	10	did not advance		
Elizabeth Kosmala	Mixed 50m rifle prone SH1	579	20	did not advance		
Elizabeth Kosmala	Women's 50m rifle three positions SH1	542	8 Q	89.1	631.1	8

Coaches - Miroslav Sipek(Head), Hans Heiderman Officials - Michelle Fletcher (Manager), Craig Jarvis, Elizabeth Ziebarth

=== Swimming ===
==== Men ====
Athlete	Class	Event	Heats		Final	
Athlete	Class	Event	Result	Rank	Result	Rank
Benoit Austin	S8	50m freestyle	28.23	3 Q	28.42	3rd place, bronze medalist(s)
Benoit Austin	S8	100m freestyle	1:01.44 PR	1 Q	59.83 WR	1st place, gold medalist(s)
Benoit Austin	S8	100m butterfly	1:05.79 WR	1 Q	1:06.57	2nd place, silver medalist(s)
Benoit Austin	SM8	200m individual medley	N/A		2:32.19	2nd place, silver medalist(s)
Daniel Bell	S10	50m freestyle	26.54	7 Q	26.62	8
Daniel Bell	S10	100m freestyle	57.56	7 Q	57.31	7
Daniel Bell	S10	100m butterfly	59.83 PR	1 Q	59.67	2nd place, silver medalist(s)
Daniel Bell	SB9	100m breaststroke	1:12.10 WR	1 Q	1:11.79	2nd place, silver medalist(s)
Daniel Bell	SM10	200m individual medley	2:25.74	6 Q	2:28.59	7
Sam Bramham	S9	100m butterfly	1:04.24 WR	1 Q	1:04.25	3rd place, bronze medalist(s)
Matthew Cowdrey	S9	50m freestyle	27.29	4 Q	26.88	3rd place, bronze medalist(s)
Matthew Cowdrey	S9	100m freestyle	58.77	1 Q	58.15 WR	1st place, gold medalist(s)
Matthew Cowdrey	S9	400m freestyle	4:37.93	5 Q	4:31.80	3rd place, bronze medalist(s)
Matthew Cowdrey	S9	100m backstroke	1:09.70	6 Q	1:08.44	6
Matthew Cowdrey	S9	100m butterfly	1:05.34	3 Q	1:04.24	2nd place, silver medalist(s)
Matthew Cowdrey	SB9	100m breaststroke	1:18.92	13	did not advance	
Matthew Cowdrey	SM9	200m individual medley	2:26.44	2 Q	2:21.80 WR	1st place, gold medalist(s)
Dale Grant	S9	50m freestyle	28.30	14	did not advance	
Dale Grant	S9	100m freestyle	1:02.90	19	did not advance	
Alex Hadley	S7	50m freestyle	31.00	8 Q	31.08	8
Alex Hadley	S7	100m freestyle	1:07.71	6 Q	1:06.85	5
Alex Hadley	S7	400m freestyle	5:17.82	6 Q	5:20.77	6
Alex Hadley	S7	50m butterfly	36.60	7 Q	36.20	8
Alex Harris	S7	50m freestyle	30.62	6 Q	30.12	5
Alex Harris	S7	100m freestyle	1:06.95	4 Q	1:05.79	4
Alex Harris	S7	50m butterfly	37.68	14	did not advance	
Alex Harris	SB7	100m breaststroke	1:40.72	10	did not advance	
Matt Levy	S8	50m freestyle	29.98	5 Q	30.14	5
Matt Levy	S8	100m freestyle	1:05.21	5 Q	1:04.99	5
Matt Levy	S8	400m freestyle	5:07.73	8 Q	5:04.64	8
Matt Levy	S8	100m backstroke	1:22.49	10	did not advance	
Matt Levy	S8	100m butterfly	1:18.32	10	did not advance	
Jeremy McClure	S12	400m freestyle	5:12.70	12	did not advance	
Jeremy McClure	S12	100m backstroke	1:07.85	6 Q	1:08.12	6
Jeremy McClure	SB12	100m breaststroke	1:22.69	17	did not advance	
Ricardo Moffatti	S8	50m freestyle	29.60	4 Q	29.42	4
Ricardo Moffatti	S8	100m freestyle	1:03.73	3 Q	1:03.12	3rd place, bronze medalist(s)
Ricardo Moffatti	S8	100m butterfly	1:13.72	5 Q	1:13.72	5
Rick Pendleton	S10	100m backstroke	1:11.67	13	did not advance	
Rick Pendleton	S10	100m butterfly	1:06.31	11	did not advance	
Rick Pendleton	SB10	100m breaststroke	1:14.98	6 Q	1:14.75	7
Rick Pendleton	SM10	200m individual medley	2:25.34	4 Q	2:22.69	4
Alastair Smales	S6	50m freestyle	35.11	12	did not advance	
Alastair Smales	S6	100m freestyle	1:24.23	14	did not advance	
Alastair Smales	S6	50m butterfly	34.49	4 Q	34.34	5
Rod Welsh	S10	50m freestyle	27.49	14	did not advance	
Rod Welsh	S10	100m freestyle	57.35	6 Q	57.06	6
Rod Welsh	S10	100m freestyle	1:06.59	1 Q	1:04.55	3rd place, bronze medalist(s)
Rod Welsh	SM10	200m individual medley	2:25.09	3 Q	2:22.13	2nd place, silver medalist(s)
Daniel Bell; Sam Bramham; Alex Hadley; Ricardo Moffatti	N/A	4 × 100 m freestyle relay (34pts)	4:07.80	2 Q	4:02.04	2nd place, silver medalist(s)
Sam Bramham; Matthew Cowdrey; Alex Hadley; Rick Pendleton	N/A	4 × 100 m medley relay (34pts)	4:36.92	4 Q	4:26.25 WR	1st place, gold medalist(s)

==== Women ====
Athlete	Class	Event	Heats		Final	
Athlete	Class	Event	Result	Rank	Result	Rank
Katerina Bailey	S9	100m backstroke	1:23.36	11	did not advance	
Katerina Bailey	S9	100m butterfly	1:17.95	5 Q	1:16.61	3rd place, bronze medalist(s)
Katerina Bailey	SM9	200m individual medley	2:55.26	8 Q	2:52.28	6
Sarah Bowen	S6	50m freestyle	42.43	10	did not advance	
Sarah Bowen	S6	100m freestyle	1:30.75	10	did not advance	
Sarah Bowen	S6	100m backstroke	1:42.62	7 Q	1:40.35	7
Sarah Bowen	SB6	100m breaststroke	1:46.20	1 Q	1:41.84 WR	1st place, gold medalist(s)
Lichelle Clarke	S8	50m freestyle	35.75	10	did not advance	
Lichelle Clarke	S8	100m freestyle	1:14.09	6 Q	1:14.51	6
Lichelle Clarke	S8	400m freestyle	5:32.39	5 Q	5:22.99	2nd place, silver medalist(s)
Lichelle Clarke	S8	100m backstroke	1:29.58	6 Q	1:30.35	7
Mandy Drennan	S9	100m freestyle	1:09.52	8 Q	1:08.68	5
Mandy Drennan	S9	100m backstroke	1:19.68	7 Q	1:20.59	8
Mandy Drennan	S9	100m butterfly	1:22.56	11	did not advance	
Marayke Jonkers	SB3	50m breaststroke	1:02.96	3 Q	1:02.63	3rd place, bronze medalist(s)
Marayke Jonkers	SM4	150m individual medley	3:26.01	4 Q	3:26.90	3rd place, bronze medalist(s)
Kat Lewis	S10	50m freestyle	31.06	4 Q	30.82	5
Kat Lewis	S10	100m freestyle	1:07.39	7 Q	1:06.70	7
Kat Lewis	S10	400m freestyle	5:07.47	4 Q	5:03.48	4
Kat Lewis	S10	100m butterfly	1:20.98	6 Q	1:19.93	5
Hannah MacDougall	S10	100m freestyle	1:11.99	13	did not advance	
Hannah MacDougall	S10	400m freestyle	5:22.33	10	did not advance	
Hannah MacDougall	S10	100m backstroke	N/A		1:18.17	4
Katrina Porter	S8	100m freestyle	1:20.79	11	did not advance	
Katrina Porter	S8	400m freestyle	5:34.54	6 Q	5:35.63	7
Katrina Porter	SB6	100m breaststroke	1:57.79	7 Q	1:56.38	7
Sarah Rose	S6	50m freestyle	42.89	12	did not advance	
Sarah Rose	S6	100m freestyle	1:35.00	13	did not advance	
Sarah Rose	S6	50m butterfly	42.26	3 Q	41.96	3rd place, bronze medalist(s)
Sarah Rose	SM6	200m individual medley	3:35.55	6 Q	3:36.28	7
Dianne Saunders	S7	50m butterfly	52.32	12	did not advance	
Dianne Saunders	SB7	100m breaststroke	1:46.10	4 Q	1:44.99	4
Dianne Saunders	SM7	200m individual medley	3:48.55	10	did not advance	
Kobie Scott	S8	100m backstroke	1:30.09	7 Q	1:30.03	7
Kobie Scott	S8	100m butterfly	1:28.64	5 Q	1:29.20	7
Jessica Smith	S9	50m freestyle	33.12	9	did not advance	
Jessica Smith	S9	100m freestyle	1:12.76	11	did not advance	
Jessica Smith	S9	100m butterfly	1:23.35	14	did not advance	
Brooke Stockham	S8	100m butterfly	1:30.18	7 Q	1:29.47	8
Brooke Stockham	SB8	100m breaststroke	1:34.41	7 Q	1:34.96	7
Brooke Stockham	SM8	200m individual medley	3:09.80	7 Q	3:13.38	8
Prue Watt	S13	50m freestyle	29.45	2 Q	28.89	2nd place, silver medalist(s)
Prue Watt	S13	100m freestyle	1:03.75	2 Q	1:03.30	2nd place, silver medalist(s)
Prue Watt	S13	400m freestyle	N/A		4:49.51	2nd place, silver medalist(s)
Prue Watt	S13	100m butterfly	N/A		1:08.41	2nd place, silver medalist(s)
Prue Watt	SB13	100m breaststroke	N/A		1:23.07	3rd place, bronze medalist(s)
Prue Watt	SM13	200m individual medley	N/A		2:34.93	2nd place, silver medalist(s)
Stacey Williams	S7	50m freestyle	41.18	14	did not advance	
Stacey Williams	S7	100m freestyle	6:49.12	11	did not advance	
Stacey Williams	SB7	100m breaststroke	1:49.82	6 Q	1:50.84	6
Stacey Williams	SM7	200m individual medley	3:40.17	10	did not advance	
Chantel Wolfenden	S7	50m freestyle	36.48	5 Q	35.62	5
Chantel Wolfenden	S7	100m freestyle	1:16.36	3 Q	1:15.09	2nd place, silver medalist(s)
Chantel Wolfenden	S7	400m freestyle	5:22.71 PR	1 Q	5:20.26 PR	1st place, gold medalist(s)
Chantel Wolfenden	S7	100m backstroke	1:32.58	3 Q	1:29.81	3rd place, bronze medalist(s)
Chantel Wolfenden	S7	50m butterfly	40.26	5 Q	38.99	5
Chantel Wolfenden	SM7	200m individual medley	3:09.97	2 Q	3:10.46	3rd place, bronze medalist(s)
Kat Lewis; Lichelle Clarke; Chantel Wolfenden; Mandy Drennan	N/A	4 × 100 m freestyle relay (34pts)	N/A		4:44.57	3rd place, bronze medalist(s)
Chantel Wolfenden; Katerina Bailey; Brooke Stockham; Hannah MacDougall	N/A	4 × 100 m medley relay (34pts)	N/A		5:25.02	3rd place, bronze medalist(s)

Coaches - Brendan Keogh (Head), John Beckworth, Peter Bishop, Graeme Carroll, Gwen Godfrey, Paul Simms

Officials - Adam Luscombe (Manager), Zoe Young, Brendan Burkett,

=== Wheelchair basketball ===
==== Men ====
Before the Athens 2004 wheelchair basketball competition, the men's team, popularly called The Rollers, goal was to improve their fifth place from Sydney. With the help of quality leadership from both staff and senior players they succeeded and won the silver medal playing against Canada.

- Brendan Dowler
- Justin Eveson
- Andrew Flavel
- Adrian King
- Tristan Knowles
- Campbell Message
- Grant Mizens
- Brad Ness
- Shaun Norris
- Troy Sachs
- David Selby
- Daryl Taylor

The silver medal would not have been possible without a great collective effort from the coaches or managerial staff.

==== Coaching and managerial staff ====
- Head coach: Murray Treseder
- Assistant: Coach Alan Cox
- Manager: Kelvin Browner
- Video Technician/Assistant: Coach Craig Friday
- Mechanic: Graham Gould
- Physiotherapist: John Camens
- Mechanic: Troy Andrews
- General Assistant in the USA: Rick Browner
- Basketball Australia and APC office staff

==== Results ====
Game	Match	Score	Rank
1	Australia vs. Canada (CAN)	38 - 66	2 Q
2	Australia vs. Great Britain (GBR)	80 - 59	2 Q
3	Australia vs. Italy (ITA)	57 - 52	2 Q
4	Australia vs. Brazil (BRA)	66 - 51	2 Q
5	Australia vs. France (FRA)	74 - 53	2 Q
Quarterfinals	Australia vs. Germany (GER)	79 - 60	W
Semifinals	Australia vs. Great Britain (GBR)	64 - 52	W
Gold medal final	Australia vs. Canada (CAN)	53 - 70	2nd place, silver medalist(s)

Looking to improve from their loss in the Sydney 2000 Paralympics wheelchair final, the women's Wheelchair basketball team, also called The Gliders, went undefeated through the preliminary rounds beating US, Great Britain and the Netherlands. In the quarterfinal they beat Mexico before they moved on to beat Germany in the semifinals. In the finals, the US awaited. For the second time in as many Paralympic games, The Gliders were unable to overcome US, but won the silver medal. The Gliders team, consisting of a total of 12 women, had seven first time Paralympians so the silver medal was a great accomplishment.

==== Women ====
- Lisa Chaffey
- Shelley Chaplin
- Paula Coghlan
- Melanie Domaschenz
- Karen Farrell
- Kylie Gauci
- Tina McKenzie
- Alison Mosely
- Jane Sachs
- Sarah Stewart
- Liesl Tesch
- Melinda Young

==== Coaching staff ====
- Head coach: Garry Hewson
- Assistant coach: Darryl Durham
- Manager: Sonia Healy
- Mechanic: Michael Dowling

==== Results ====
Game	Match	Score	Rank
1	Australia vs. United States (USA)	62 - 61	1 Q
2	Australia vs. Great Britain (GBR)	63 - 21	1 Q
3	Australia vs. Netherlands (NED)	30 - 25	1 Q
Quarterfinals	Australia vs. Japan (JPN)	70 - 33	W
Semifinals	Australia vs. Canada (CAN)	57 - 40	W
Gold medal final	Australia vs. United States (USA)	44 - 56	2nd place, silver medalist(s)

==== Coaches and officials ====
Coaches: Alan Cox, Darryl Durham, Craig Friday, Gerry Hewson, Bernard Treseder.

Officials - Kelvin Browner, Michael Dowling, Sonia Healy (Manager).

=== Wheelchair rugby ===
The men's rugby team didn't win any medals: they were 5th out of 12.

==== Players ====
- Bryce Alman
- Ryley Batt
- Grant Boxall
- Brett Boylan
- Brad Dubberley
- Nazim Erdem
- George Hucks
- Kevin Kersnovske
- Steve Porter
- Patrick Ryan
- Ryan Scott
- Scott Vitale

==== Results ====
Game	Match	Score	Rank
1	Australia vs. New Zealand (NZL)	31 - 41	3 Q
2	Australia vs. Japan (JPN)	48 - 47	3 Q
3	Australia vs. United States (USA)	38 - 49	3 Q
Quarterfinals	Australia vs. Canada (CAN)	33 - 36	L
Semifinals (5th-8th)	Australia vs. Germany (GER)	44 - 40	W
5th-6th classification	Australia vs. Belgium (BEL)	46 - 43	5

==== Coaches and officials ====
Coaches: Glenn Stephens and Terry Vinyard

Officials: Robert Doidge, Kim Ellwood and Maria Spiller.

=== Wheelchair tennis ===
==== Men ====
Athlete	Class	Event	Round of 64	Round of 32	Round of 16	Quarterfinals	Semifinals	Finals
Athlete	Class	Event	Opposition Result	Opposition Result	Opposition Result	Opposition Result	Opposition Result	Opposition Result
Anthony Bonaccurso	Open	Singles	Vazouras (GRE); W 6–1, 6-0	Lee (KOR); W 6–2, 6-3	Welch (USA); L 1–6, 3-6	did not advance		
David Hall	Open	Singles	Diaz (ARG); W 6–0, 6-1	Mendez (CHI); W 6–0, 6-2	Rydberg (USA); W 6–0, 6-3	Kunieda (JPN); W 6–2, 0–6, 6-4	Jeremiasz (FRA); W 6–1, 6-1	Ammerlaan (NED); L 2–6, 1-6 (silver)
Ben Weekes	Open	Singles	Victor (RSA); W 6–1, 6-2	Ammerlaan (NED); L 0–6, 0-6	did not advance			
Anthony Bonaccurso; David Hall	Open	Doubles	N/A		Kruamai (THA) / Peem Mee (THA); W 6–1, 6-3	Welch (USA) / Greer (USA); W 6–4, 6-3	Kunieda (JPN) / Saida (JPN); L 6–4, 4–6, 6-7	Ammerlaan (NED) / Stuurman (NED); W 6–4, 6–7, 6-4 (bronze)

==== Women ====
Athlete	Class	Event	Round of 32	Round of 16	Quarterfinals	Semifinals	Finals
Athlete	Class	Event	Opposition Result	Opposition Result	Opposition Result	Opposition Result	Opposition Result
Daniela Di Toro	Open	Singles	Fabre (FRA); W 6–3, 6–1	Chokyu (CAN); W 6–1, 6–3	Forshaw (GBR); W 7–6, 6-0	Peters (NED); L 5–7, 6–4, 3-6	Bronze medal match Gravellier (FRA); W 1–6, 6–2, 6-2

Coaches - Greg Crump (Head)

Officials - Sallee Trewin (Manager)

== Administration ==
Headquarters staff - Paul Bird (Chef de Mission), Ken Brown (Assistant Chef de Mission), Nick Dean (Assistant Chef de Mission), Doug Denby (Assistant Chef de Mission), Jason Hellwig (Director of Operations), Natalie Jenkins (Sports Administration Officer), Jacqui Knife (Sports Administration Officer), Richard Mathews (Attache), Stephen Mathews (Manager Security), Tony Naar (Manager Sport), Graeme Watts
Sports Medicine and Sports Science - Syd Bourke (Director Medical), John Camens, Lily Chiu, Liz Cloughessy (Medical Coordinator), Kieran Cusack, Maria Di Michele, Mick Jordan, David Lee, Murray Lydeamore (Welfare Coordinator), Mark MacDonald, Ingrid McKay, Claire Nichols, David Spurrier, Greg Ungerer, Luke Vladich
Media - Graham Cassidy, Katie Hodge, Margaret McDonald, David Lutteral

== See also ==
- Australia at the Paralympics
- Australia at the 2004 Summer Olympics
