= Cycling at the 2004 Summer Paralympics =

Cycling at the XII Paralympic Games
- Paralympic Cycling
- Venue: Olympic Velodrome; Vouliagmeni
- Dates: 18–27 September 2004
- Competitors: 196 from 39 nations

The 2004 Summer Paralympics in Athens included 31 cycling events in two disciplines, track cycling and road cycling. Track cycling took place at the Olympic Velodrome, and road cycling at Vouliagmeni.

== Classifications and events ==
- B 1–3: Visually impaired athletes; these cyclists used tandem bicycles, with an able-bodied rider in the front seat
- LC 1–4: Lower limb and other locomotor disabilities graded by severity; unlike most Paralympic classes, higher numbers here indicate more severe conditions
- CP 1–4: Athletes with cerebral palsy or a similar disability; 1 and 2 used tricycles, 3 and 4 used bicycles
- HC A, B & C: Hand-using athletes, graded according to their degree of paraplegia or quadriplegia; these cyclists used handcycles

Track events consisted of:

- Individual pursuit
- Time trial
- Individual sprint, covering three laps of the track
- Team sprint, with teams of three

Road events consisted of endurance races and time trials. In the endurance road races, athletes with cerebral palsy cycled for a minimum of 15 kilometres, while men with visual impairment covered 120 kilometres. In the time trials, the distances were the same for each classification.

== Participating countries ==
- Afghanistan (1)
- Argentina (1)
- Australia (19)
- Austria (7)
- Barbados (1)
- Belarus (6)
- Belgium (1)
- Bosnia and Herzegovina (1)
- Brazil (1)
- Canada (12)
- China (6)
- Colombia (1)
- Czech Republic (8)
- Denmark (1)
- Finland (2)
- France (9)
- Germany (17)
- Great Britain (8)
- Greece (4)
- Iran (1)
- Ireland (3)
- Israel (1)
- Italy (7)
- Japan (6)
- Netherlands (5)
- New Zealand (2)
- Norway (7)
- Poland (3)
- Portugal (1)
- Romania (1)
- Slovakia (4)
- Slovenia (1)
- South Africa (4)
- South Korea (2)
- Spain (14)
- Sweden (1)
- Switzerland (8)
- United States (18)
- Venezuela (1)

== Medal table ==
Rank	Nation	Gold	Silver	Bronze	Total
1	Australia (AUS)	10	7	7	24
2	Spain (ESP)	3	4	0	7
3	Austria (AUT)	3	3	1	7
4	Great Britain (GBR)	3	2	2	7
5	United States (USA)	2	4	3	9
6	Germany (GER)	2	1	3	6
7	Czech Republic (CZE)	2	1	2	5
8	France (FRA)	1	3	2	6
9	China (CHN)	1	1	1	3
10	Slovakia (SVK)	1	1	0	2
11	Belarus (BLR)	1	0	0	1
11	Belgium (BEL)	1	0	0	1
11	Denmark (DEN)	1	0	0	1
14	Switzerland (SUI)	0	1	3	4
15	Italy (ITA)	0	1	2	3
16	Japan (JPN)	0	1	1	2
16	Netherlands (NED)	0	1	1	2
18	Argentina (ARG)	0	0	1	1
18	New Zealand (NZL)	0	0	1	1
18	South Africa (RSA)	0	0	1	1
Totals (20 entries)		31	31	31	93

== Medal summary ==
=== Road cycling ===
Event	Gold	Silver	Bronze
Men's handcycle time trial HC A	Christoph Etzlstorfer; Austria	Rastislav Tureček; Slovakia	Franz Weber; Switzerland
Men's handcycle time trial HC B/C	Marcel Pipek; Czech Republic	Johann Mayrhofer; Austria	Franz Nietlispach; Switzerland
Men's handcycle road race HC A	Rastislav Tureček; Slovakia	Franz Weber; Switzerland	Christoph Etzlstorfer; Austria
Men's handcycle road race HC B/C	Johann Mayrhofer; Austria	Alejandro Albor; United States	Johan Reekers; Netherlands
Men's bicycle road race/time trial CP 3	Javier Otxoa; Spain	Darren Kenny; Great Britain	Rodrigo López; Argentina
Men's bicycle road race/time trial CP 4	Christopher Scott; Australia	Peter Homann; Australia	Michel Alcaine; France
Men's bicycle road race/time trial LC 1	Wolfgang Eibeck; Austria	Fabio Triboli; Italy	Peter Brooks; Australia
Men's bicycle road race/time trial LC 2	Jiří Ježek; Czech Republic	Roberto Alcaide; Spain	Ron Williams; United States
Men's bicycle road race/time trial LC 3	Antonio Garcia; Spain	Laurent Thirionet; France	Paul Jesson; New Zealand
Men's bicycle road race/time trial LC 4	Michael Teuber; Germany	Wolfgang Dabernig; Austria	Erich Winkler; Germany
Men's tandem road race/time trial B 1-3	Belarus (BLR); Aliaksandr Danilik; Vasili Shaptsiaboi	Spain (ESP); David Llaurado; Christian Venge	Australia (AUS); Robert Crowe; Kieran Modra
Men's tricycle time trial CP 1/2	Dirk Boon; Belgium	Mark le Flohic; Australia	Adriaan Nel; South Africa
Men's tricycle road race CP 1/2	Mark le Flohic; Australia	Stuart Flacks; United States	Mutsuhiko Ogawa; Japan
Women's bicycle time trial LC 1–4 & CP 3/4	Karen Jacobsen; Denmark	Claire McLean; Australia	Sara Tretola; Switzerland
Women's tandem road race/time trial B 1-3	United States (USA); Katie Compton; Karissa Whitsell	Australia (AUS); Lindy Hou; Toireasa Ryan	Australia (AUS); Kelly McCombie; Janet Shaw

=== Track cycling ===
Event	Gold	Silver	Bronze
Men's bicycle 1 km time trial CP 3/4	Darren Kenny; Great Britain	Andrew Panazzolo; Australia	Jiří Bouška; Czech Republic
Men's bicycle 1 km time trial LC 1–4	Greg Ball; Australia	Laurent Thirionet; France	Tobias Graf; Germany
Men's tandem 1 km time trial B 1-3	Australia (AUS); Anthony Biddle; Kial Stewart	France (FRA); Frederic Janowski; Patrice Senmartin	Great Britain (GBR); Paul Hunter; Ian Sharpe
Men's bicycle 3 km individual pursuit CP 3	Darren Kenny; Great Britain	Javier Otxoa; Spain	Andrew Panazzolo; Australia
Men's bicycle 3 km individual pursuit CP 4	Christopher Scott; Australia	Peter Homann; Australia	Jiří Bouška; Czech Republic
Men's bicycle 4 km individual pursuit LC 1	Peter Brooks; Australia	Wolfgang Eibeck; Austria	Fabio Triboli; Italy
Men's bicycle 4 km individual pursuit LC 2	Roberto Alcaide; Spain	Jiří Ježek; Czech Republic	Paul Martin; United States
Men's bicycle 3 km individual pursuit LC 3	Laurent Thirionet; France	Tobias Graf; Germany	Fabrizio Macchi; Italy
Men's bicycle 3 km individual pursuit LC 4	Michael Teuber; Germany	Juanjo Mendez; Spain	Hans Peter Beier; Germany
Men's tandem 4 km individual pursuit B 1-3	Australia (AUS); Robert Crowe; Kieran Modra	Netherlands (NED); Jan Mulder; Pascal Schoots	Great Britain (GBR); Paul Hunter; Ian Sharpe
Men's tandem sprint B 1-3	Australia (AUS); Kieran Modra; David Short	Japan (JPN); Takuya Oki; Shigeo Yoshihara	Australia (AUS); Anthony Biddle; Kial Stewart
Men's bicycle team sprint LC 1–4 & CP 3/4	Australia (AUS); Greg Ball; Peter Brooks; Christopher Scott	United States (USA); Daniel Nicholson; Paul Martin; Ron Williams	France (FRA); David Mercier; Patrick Ceria; Laurent Thirionet
Women's bicycle 1 km time trial LC 1–4 & CP3/4	Zhou Jufang; China	An Fengzhen; China	Qi Tang; China
Women's tandem 1 km time trial B 1-3	Great Britain (GBR); Ellen Hunter; Aileen McGlynn	United States (USA); Katie Compton; Karissa Whitsell	Australia (AUS); Lindy Hou; Janelle Lindsay
Women's tandem 3 km individual pursuit B 1-3	United States (USA); Katie Compton; Karissa Whitsell	Australia (AUS); Lindy Hou; Toireasa Ryan	Australia (AUS); Kelly McCombie; Janet Shaw
Women's tandem sprint B 1-3	Australia (AUS); Lindy Hou; Janelle Lindsay	Great Britain (GBR); Ellen Hunter; Aileen McGlynn	United States (USA); Katie Compton; Karissa Whitsell

== See also ==
- Cycling at the 2004 Summer Olympics
