= Cycling at the 2004 Summer Paralympics – Men's team sprint =

Men's Team Sprint LC1-4/CP 3/4 at the XII Paralympic Games
- Paralympic Cycling (track)
- Venue: Olympic Velodrome
- Dates: 19 September 2004
- Competitors: 8

Medalists
1st place, gold medalist(s)		Peter Brooks; Peter Homann; Christopher Scott; Greg Ball	Australia
2nd place, silver medalist(s)		Daniel Nicholson; Ron Williams; Paul Martin	United States
3rd place, bronze medalist(s)		David Mercier; Patrick Ceria; Laurent Thirionet	France

The Men's team sprint LC1-4/CP 3/4 track cycling event at the 2004 Summer Paralympics was competed on 19 September. It was won by the team representing Australia.

== Qualifying ==
Only for positioning in the heats - no eliminations

Rank	Team	Time	Notes
1	Australia	53.310	
2	United States	55.411	
3	France	57.439	
4	Germany	57.621	
5	Czech Republic	57.659	
6	Spain	58.517	
7	Italy	1:00.685	
8	Canada	1:04.453	

== 1st round ==
Qualified for gold final
Qualified for bronze final

Heat 1

Rank	Team	Time	Notes
1	Germany	56.939	
2	Czech Republic	57.285	

Heat 2

Rank	Team	Time	Notes
1	France	57.105	
2	Spain	57.427	

Heat 3

Rank	Team	Time	Notes
1	United States	55.678	
2	Italy	DNS	

Heat 4

Rank	Team	Time	Notes
1	Australia	53.874	
2	Canada	1:08.817	

== Final round ==
Gold

Rank	Team	Time	Notes
1st place, gold medalist(s)	Australia	53.968	
2nd place, silver medalist(s)	United States	55.606	

Bronze

Rank	Team	Time	Notes
3rd place, bronze medalist(s)	France	56.611	
4	Germany	56.805	

== Team Lists ==
Australia; Peter Brooks; Peter Homann; Christopher Scott; Greg Ball	United States; Daniel Nicholson; Ron Williams; Paul Martin	France; David Mercier; Patrick Ceria; Laurent Thirionet	Germany; Tobias Graf; Gotty Mueller; Guenter Brechtel
Czech Republic; Michal Stark; Jirí Ježek; Jiri Bouska	Spain; Amador Granado; Roberto Alcaide; Javier Otxoa	Italy; Fabrizio Macchi; Fabio Triboli; Andreas Gemassmer	Canada; Marc Breton; Jean Quevillon; Bruce Penner
