= Swimming at the 2004 Summer Paralympics – Women's 100 metre butterfly S9 =

Women's 100m Butterfly S9 at the XII Paralympic Games
- Paralympic Swimming
- Venue: Olympic Aquatic Centre
- Dates: 19 September 2004
- Competitors: 19 from 11 nations
- Winning time: 1:07.54

Medalists
1st place, gold medalist(s)		Natalie du Toit	South Africa
2nd place, silver medalist(s)		Stephanie Dixon	Canada
3rd place, bronze medalist(s)		Katerina Bailey	Australia

The Women's 100 metre butterfly S9 swimming event at the 2004 Summer Paralympics was competed on 19 September. It was won by Natalie du Toit, representing South Africa.

== 1st round ==
Qualified for final round

Heat 1

19 Sept. 2004, morning session

Rank	Athlete	Time	Notes
1	Stephanie Dixon (CAN)	1:13.81	PR
2	Kelly Crowley (USA)	1:18.37	
3	Zhou Zi Cun (CHN)	1:21.76	
4	Mandy Drennan (AUS)	1:22.56	
5	Zhao Chunhua (CHN)	1:22.67	
6	Irina Grazhdanova (RUS)	1:23.19	

Heat 2

19 Sept. 2004, morning session

Rank	Athlete	Time	Notes
1	Katerina Bailey (AUS)	1:17.95	
2	Sisse Grynet Egeborg (DEN)	1:18.44	
3	Ivy Garrison (USA)	1:20.28	
4	Kathrine Gronkjaer (DEN)	1:20.65	
5	Jessica Smith (AUS)	1:23.35	
6	Tatiana Outekina (RUS)	1:25.20	

Heat 3

19 Sept. 2004, morning session

Rank	Athlete	Time	Notes
1	Natalie du Toit (RSA)	1:07.69	WR
2	Emilie Gral (FRA)	1:17.03	
3	Leila Marques (POR)	1:17.64	
4	Claire Cashmore (GBR)	1:18.92	
5	Claire Conway (IRL)	1:24.37	
6	Jiang Min (CHN)	1:26.54	
7	Elizabeth Stone (USA)	1:27.96	

== Final round ==
19 Sept. 2004, evening session

Rank	Athlete	Time	Notes
1st place, gold medalist(s)	Natalie du Toit (RSA)	1:07.54	WR
2nd place, silver medalist(s)	Stephanie Dixon (CAN)	1:12.01	
3rd place, bronze medalist(s)	Katerina Bailey (AUS)	1:16.61	
4	Emilie Gral (FRA)	1:17.06	
5	Sisse Grynet Egeborg (DEN)	1:18.10	
6	Kelly Crowley (USA)	1:18.29	
7	Leila Marques (POR)	1:18.40	
8	Claire Cashmore (GBR)	1:19.60	
