= Cycling at the 2004 Summer Paralympics – Women's road race/time trial =

Women's Road Race / Time Trial Tandem B1-3 at the XII Paralympic Games
- Paralympic Cycling
- Venue: Vouliagmeni
- Dates: 26 September 2004
- Competitors: 12 from 9 nations

Medalists
1st place, gold medalist(s)		Karissa Whitsell; Katie Compton	United States
2nd place, silver medalist(s)		Lindy Hou; Toireasa Ryan	Australia
3rd place, bronze medalist(s)		Janet Shaw; Kelly McCombie	Australia

The Women's combined road race / time trial cycling event for blind & visually impaired competitors at the 2004 Summer Paralympics was held at Vouliagmeni. It consisted of a road race held on 25 September and a time trial two days later.

Rankings were determined by adding the finishing positions in the two races, if this produced ties the aggregate times were used as tie-breakers. The event was won by Karissa Whitsell and her sighted pilot Katie Compton, representing United States.

== Final ranking ==
Rank	Athlete	Points	Notes
1st place, gold medalist(s)	Karissa Whitsell (USA); Katie Compton (USA)	3	
2nd place, silver medalist(s)	Lindy Hou (AUS); Toireasa Ryan (AUS)	4	
3rd place, bronze medalist(s)	Janet Shaw (AUS); Kelly McCombie (AUS)	7	T:1:57:20
4	Ingunn Bollerud (NOR); Tone Gravvold (NOR)	7	T:2:00:59
5	Yadviha Skorabahataya (BLR); Natallia Piatrova (BLR)	10	
6	Michaela Fuchs (GER); Eva Fuenfgeld (GER)	13	T:2:06:52
7	Lisa Sweeney (CAN); Shawn Marsolais (CAN)	13	T:2:06:56
8	Merja Hanski (FIN); Virve Taljavirta (FIN)	15	
9	Lyn Lepore (AUS); Janelle Lindsay (AUS)	18	
10	Beatriz Eva Grande (ESP); Ana Miguelez (ESP)	20	
11	Xu Yi Mei (CHN); Yan Xiaolei (CHN)	22	
12	Iryna Fiadotava (BLR); Aksana Zviahintsava (BLR)	24	
