= Cycling at the 2004 Summer Paralympics – Men's individual pursuit (LC 1) =

Men's Individual Pursuit LC1 at the XII Paralympic Games
- Paralympic Cycling (track)
- Venue: Olympic Velodrome
- Dates: 18–19 September 2004
- Competitors: 13 from 10 nations

Medalists
1st place, gold medalist(s)		Peter Brooks	Australia
2nd place, silver medalist(s)		Wolfgang Eibeck	Austria
3rd place, bronze medalist(s)		Fabio Triboli	Italy

The Men's individual pursuit LC1 track cycling event at the 2004 Summer Paralympics was competed from 18 to 19 September. It was won by Peter Brooks, representing Australia.

== Qualifying ==
Qualified for next round

18 Sept. 2004, 12:05

Rank	Athlete	Time	Notes
1	Peter Brooks (AUS)	4:52.81	
2	Wolfgang Eibeck (AUT)	4:53.90	
3	Fabio Triboli (ITA)	5:00.47	
4	Pierangelo Vignati (ITA)	5:04.18	
5	Ivan Renggli (SUI)	5:11.36	
6	Guenter Schambeck (GER)	5:12.47	
7	Guenter Brechtel (GER)	5:13.53	
8	David Mercier (FRA)	5:14.07	
9	Marc Breton (CAN)	5:17.56	
10	Roman Marcek (SVK)	5:19.35	
11	Walter Marquardt (GER)	5:21.28	
12	Akio Sakuma (JPN)	5:36.29	
13	Loukas Anestis (GRE)	6:12.32	

== 1st round ==
Qualified for gold final
Qualified for bronze final

Heat 1

19 Sept. 2004, 14:35

Rank	Athlete	Time	Notes
1	Ivan Renggli (SUI)	5:05.87	
2	Pierangelo Vignati (ITA)	5:15.00	

Heat 2

Rank	Athlete	Time	Notes
1	Fabio Triboli (ITA)	5:01.71	
2	Guenter Schambeck (GER)	OVL	

Heat 3

Rank	Athlete	Time	Notes
1	Wolfgang Eibeck (AUT)	4:56.06	
2	Guenter Brechtel (GER)	OVL	

Heat 4

Rank	Athlete	Time	Notes
1	Peter Brooks (AUS)	4:53.00	
2	David Mercier (FRA)	OVL	

== Final round ==
19 Sept. 2004, 16:40

Gold

Rank	Athlete	Time	Notes
1st place, gold medalist(s)	Peter Brooks (AUS)	4:52.48	
2nd place, silver medalist(s)	Wolfgang Eibeck (AUT)	4:58.44	

Bronze

Rank	Athlete	Time	Notes
3rd place, bronze medalist(s)	Fabio Triboli (ITA)	5:03.43	
4	Ivan Renggli (SUI)	5:08.00	
