= Equestrian at the 2004 Summer Paralympics – Individual championship test grade III =

Mixed Dressage - Championship grade III at the XII Paralympic Games
- Paralympic Equestrian
- Venue: Markopoulo Olympic Equestrian Centre
- Dates: 21 September 2004
- Competitors: 16 from 12 nations
- Winning points: 74.400

Medalists
1st place, gold medalist(s)		Deborah Criddle	Great Britain
2nd place, silver medalist(s)		Bianca Vogel	Germany
3rd place, bronze medalist(s)		Bettina Eistel	Germany

The Individual championship test grade III equestrian event at the 2004 Summer Paralympics was competed on 21 September. It was won by Deborah Criddle, representing Great Britain.

== Final round ==
21 Sept. 2004, 14:10

Rank	Athlete	Points	Notes
1st place, gold medalist(s)	Deborah Criddle (GBR)	74.400	
2nd place, silver medalist(s)	Bianca Vogel (GER)	72.240	
3rd place, bronze medalist(s)	Bettina Eistel (GER)	71.120	
4	Bert Vermeir (BEL)	70.960	
5	Jose Letartre (FRA)	70.160	
6	Marita Hird (AUS)	67.520	
7	Hanne Nesheim (NOR)	65.120	
8	Gabriella Loef (SWE)	64.720	
9	Berit Svensson (SWE)	64.560	
10	Patricio Guglialmelli (ARG)	63.600	
11	Barbara Grassmyer (USA)	63.200	
12	Anne Skinner (AUS)	61.280	
13	Silje Gillund (NOR)	60.960	
14	Carlos Pereira (POR)	60.320	
15	Nikolaos Sigkas (GRE)	60.160	
16	Bernadett Andics (HUN)	56.880	
