= Swimming at the 2004 Summer Paralympics – Men's 200 metre individual medley SM10 =

Men's 200m Individual Medley SM10 at the XII Paralympic Games
- Paralympic Swimming
- Venue: Olympic Aquatic Centre
- Dates: 23 September 2004
- Competitors: 12 from 9 nations
- Winning time: 2:15.78

Medalists
1st place, gold medalist(s)		Benoît Huot	Canada
2nd place, silver medalist(s)		Rod Welsh	Australia
3rd place, bronze medalist(s)		Piotr Pijanowski	Poland

The Men's 200 metre individual medley SM10 swimming event at the 2004 Summer Paralympics was competed on 23 September. It was won by Benoît Huot, representing Canada.

== 1st round ==
Qualified for final round

Heat 1

23 Sept. 2004, morning session

Rank	Athlete	Time	Notes
1	Sven Decaesstecker (BEL)	2:25.72	
2	Daniel Bell (AUS)	2:25.74	
3	Joost de Hoogh (NED)	2:27.03	
4	Filip Coufal (CZE)	2:28.24	
5	Yang Fu (CHN)	2:30.24	
6	Luis Carlos Fernandez (CRC)	2:30.75	

Heat 2

23 Sept. 2004, morning session

Rank	Athlete	Time	Notes
1	Benoît Huot (CAN)	2:24.44	
2	Piotr Pijanowski (POL)	2:24.88	
3	Rod Welsh (AUS)	2:25.09	
4	Rick Pendleton (AUS)	2:25.34	
5	Justin Zook (USA)	2:30.66	
6	Huang Zhaohang (CHN)	2:43.01	

== Final round ==
23 Sept. 2004, evening session

Rank	Athlete	Time	Notes
1st place, gold medalist(s)	Benoît Huot (CAN)	2:15.78	PR
2nd place, silver medalist(s)	Rod Welsh (AUS)	2:22.13	
3rd place, bronze medalist(s)	Piotr Pijanowski (POL)	2:22.62	
4	Rick Pendleton (AUS)	2:22.69	
5	Joost de Hoogh (NED)	2:23.70	
6	Sven Decaesstecker (BEL)	2:24.03	
7	Daniel Bell (AUS)	2:28.59	
8	Filip Coufal (CZE)	2:31.46	
