= Equestrian at the 2004 Summer Paralympics – Individual freestyle test grade III =

Mixed Dressage - Freestyle grade III at the XII Paralympic Games
- Paralympic Equestrian
- Venue: Markopoulo Olympic Equestrian Centre
- Dates: 23 September 2004
- Competitors: 16 from 12 nations
- Winning points: 81.722

Medalists
1st place, gold medalist(s)		Deborah Criddle	Great Britain
2nd place, silver medalist(s)		Bettina Eistel	Germany
3rd place, bronze medalist(s)		Bert Vermeir	Belgium

The Individual freestyle test grade III equestrian event at the 2004 Summer Paralympics was competed on 23 September. It was won by Deborah Criddle, representing Great Britain.

== Final round ==
23 Sept. 2004, 14:10

Rank	Athlete	Points	Notes
1st place, gold medalist(s)	Deborah Criddle (GBR)	81.722	
2nd place, silver medalist(s)	Bettina Eistel (GER)	77.778	
3rd place, bronze medalist(s)	Bert Vermeir (BEL)	74.722	
4	Marita Hird (AUS)	73.389	
5	Jose Letartre (FRA)	73.056	
6	Gabriella Loef (SWE)	71.778	
7	Patricio Guglialmelli (ARG)	69.278	
8	Hanne Nesheim (NOR)	68.722	
9	Anne Skinner (AUS)	68.500	
10	Berit Svensson (SWE)	68.500	
11	Barbara Grassmyer (USA)	68.444	
12	Silje Gillund (NOR)	62.944	
13	Carlos Pereira (POR)	62.889	
14	Nikolaos Sigkas (GRE)	61.278	
15	Bernadett Andics (HUN)	58.278	
16	Bianca Vogel (GER)	54.056	
