= Cycling at the 2004 Summer Paralympics – Men's individual pursuit (CP 4) =

Men's Individual Pursuit CP Div 4 at the XII Paralympic Games
- Paralympic Cycling (track)
- Venue: Olympic Velodrome
- Dates: 19–20 September 2004
- Competitors: 11 from 7 nations

Medalists
1st place, gold medalist(s)		Christopher Scott	Australia
2nd place, silver medalist(s)		Peter Homann	Australia
3rd place, bronze medalist(s)		Jiri Bouska	Czech Republic

The Men's individual pursuit CP Div 4 track cycling event at the 2004 Summer Paralympics was competed from 19 to 20 September. It was won by Christopher Scott, representing Australia.

== Qualifying ==
Qualified for next round

19 Sept. 2004, 11:25

Rank	Athlete	Time	Notes
1	Christopher Scott (AUS)	3:35.37	PR
2	Peter Homann (AUS)	3:43.32	
3	Jiri Bouska (CZE)	3:47.32	
4	Lubos Jirka (CZE)	3:53.71	
5	Klaus Lungershausen (GER)	3:55.55	
6	Stephan Herholdt (RSA)	3:56.17	
7	Janos Plekker (RSA)	3:58.45	
8	Albert Michini (USA)	4:04.06	
9	Michael Kurz (AUT)	4:11.17	
10	Michel Alcaine (FRA)	4:13.75	
11	Petr Plihal (CZE)	4:16.37	

== 1st round ==
Qualified for gold final
Qualified for bronze final

Heat 1

20 Sept. 2004, 11:40

Rank	Athlete	Time	Notes
1	Lubos Jirka (CZE)	3:53.36	
2	Klaus Lungershausen (GER)	3:55.60	

Heat 2

Rank	Athlete	Time	Notes
1	Jiri Bouska (CZE)	3:43.61	
2	Stephan Herholdt (RSA)	OVL	

Heat 3

Rank	Athlete	Time	Notes
1	Peter Homann (AUS)	3:40.65	
2	Janos Plekker (RSA)	OVL	

Heat 4

Rank	Athlete	Time	Notes
1	Christopher Scott (AUS)	3:35.90	
2	Albert Michini (USA)	OVL	

== Final round ==
20 Sept. 2004, 14:35

Gold

Rank	Athlete	Time	Notes
1st place, gold medalist(s)	Christopher Scott (AUS)	3:32.96	WR
2nd place, silver medalist(s)	Peter Homann (AUS)	3:41.44	

Bronze

Rank	Athlete	Time	Notes
3rd place, bronze medalist(s)	Jiri Bouska (CZE)	3:46.62	
4	Lubos Jirka (CZE)	3:52.22	
