= Shooting at the 2004 Summer Paralympics – Mixed 10 metre air rifle prone SH2 =

Mixed 10m Air Rifle Prone SH2 at the XII Paralympic Games
- Paralympic Shooting
- Venue: Markopoulo Olympic Shooting Centre
- Dates: 20 September 2004
- Competitors: 26 from 16 nations
- Winning points: 705.4

Medalists
1st place, gold medalist(s)		Minna Leinonen	Finland
2nd place, silver medalist(s)		Ho Gyoung You	South Korea
3rd place, bronze medalist(s)		Johnny Andersen	Denmark

The Mixed 10m Air Rifle Prone SH2 shooting event at the 2004 Summer Paralympics was competed on 20 September. It was won by Minna Leinonen, representing Finland.

== Preliminary ==
Qualified for next round

20 Sept. 2004, 12:45

Rank	Athlete	Points	Notes
1	Minna Leinonen (FIN)	600	=WR Q
1	Ho Gyoung You (KOR)	600	=WR Q
1	Juan Antonio Saavedra (ESP)	600	=WR Q
1	Liu Jie (CHN)	600	=WR Q
1	Damjan Pavlin (SLO)	600	=WR Q
6	Viktoria Wedin (SWE)	599	Q
7	Akiko Sakuraoka (JPN)	599	Q
8	Johnny Andersen (DEN)	599	Q
9	Mike Johnson (NZL)	599	
10	Christiane Latzke (GER)	598	
10	Bruce Heidt (CAN)	598	
12	Akbar Alli Poor (IRI)	597	
12	Ayatollah Heydari (IRI)	597	
12	Mike Larochelle (CAN)	597	
12	Wolfgang Stoeckl (GER)	597	
16	Luc Dessart (BEL)	596	
16	Kalevi Kaipainen (FIN)	596	
18	Hitomi Suzuki (JPN)	595	
18	Srecko Majcenovic (SLO)	595	
20	Tanguy de la Forest (FRA)	594	
20	Lone Overbye (DEN)	594	
22	Hans Peter Stamper (BEL)	593	
23	Peter Worsley (AUS)	591	
23	David Ziebarth (AUS)	591	
25	Panagiotis Giannoukaris (GRE)	588	
26	Yukiko Kinoshita (JPN)	585	

== Final round ==
20 Sept. 2004, 16:00

Rank	Athlete	Points	Notes
1st place, gold medalist(s)	Minna Leinonen (FIN)	705.4	
2nd place, silver medalist(s)	Ho Gyoung You (KOR)	705.3	
3rd place, bronze medalist(s)	Johnny Andersen (DEN)	704.4	
4	Juan Antonio Saavedra (ESP)	704.1	
5	Liu Jie (CHN)	703.9	
6	Damjan Pavlin (SLO)	703.6	
7	Viktoria Wedin (SWE)	703.5	
8	Akiko Sakuraoka (JPN)	702.9	
