= Shooting at the 2004 Summer Paralympics – Mixed 50 metre rifle prone SH1 =

Mixed 50m Free Rifle Prone SH1 at the XII Paralympic Games
- Paralympic Shooting
- Venue: Markopoulo Olympic Shooting Centre
- Dates: 23 September 2004
- Competitors: 36 from 20 nations
- Winning points: 701.4

Medalists
1st place, gold medalist(s)		Jonas Jacobsson	Sweden
2nd place, silver medalist(s)		Ashley Adams	Australia
3rd place, bronze medalist(s)		Doron Shaziri	Israel

The Mixed 50m Free Rifle Prone SH1 shooting event at the 2004 Summer Paralympics was competed on 23 September. It was won by Jonas Jacobsson, representing Sweden.

== Preliminary ==
Qualified for next round

23 Sept. 2004, 09:00

Rank	Athlete	Points	Notes
1	Jonas Jacobsson (SWE)	597	WR Q
2	Ashley Adams (AUS)	595	Q
3	Doron Shaziri (ISR)	592	Q
4	Abraham Hadassi (ISR)	590	Q
5	Veikko Palsamaki (FIN)	589	Q
6	Chris Trifonidis (CAN)	587	Q
7	Cedric Friggeri (FRA)	586	Q
8	Dan Jordan (USA)	586	Q
9	Franz Falke (GER)	586	
10	Daniele de Michiel (ITA)	585	
11	Sim Jae Yong (KOR)	584	
11	Kim Im Yeon (KOR)	584	
13	Azzurra Ciani (ITA)	582	
13	Jozef Siroky (SVK)	582	
15	Veronika Vadovicová (SVK)	581	
15	Enayatollah Bokharaei (IRI)	581	
15	Hasan Akbari Talarposhti (IRI)	581	
18	Waldemar Andruszkiewicz (POL)	580	
18	Alfred Beringer (GER)	580	
20	Elizabeth Kosmala (AUS)	579	
20	August Wyss (SUI)	579	
22	Victor Firsov (RUS)	578	
23	Thomas Johansson (SWE)	577	
24	Jolanta Szulc (POL)	575	
25	Muhiddin Cemiloglu (TUR)	574	
25	Franc Pinter (SLO)	574	
27	Erkki Pekkala (FIN)	573	
28	Kazimierz Mechula (DEN)	572	
29	Bjorn Samuelsson (SWE)	572	
30	Lauro Pederzoli (ITA)	571	
31	Lev Makarov (RUS)	570	
32	Bernhard Fendt (GER)	568	
32	Walter Holzner (AUT)	568	
34	Andrzej Saluda (POL)	566	
34	Werner Mueller (AUT)	566	
36	Nilda Gómez López (PUR)	DNF	

== Final round ==
23 Sept. 2004, 12:00

Rank	Athlete	Points	Notes
1st place, gold medalist(s)	Jonas Jacobsson (SWE)	701.4	WR
2nd place, silver medalist(s)	Ashley Adams (AUS)	697.8	
3rd place, bronze medalist(s)	Doron Shaziri (ISR)	692.4	
4	Abraham Hadassi (ISR)	691.2	
5	Veikko Palsamaki (FIN)	689.9	
6	Chris Trifonidis (CAN)	689.8	
7	Dan Jordan (USA)	689.5	
8	Cedric Friggeri (FRA)	684.4	
