= Shooting at the 2004 Summer Paralympics – Mixed 10 metre air rifle prone SH1 =

Mixed 10m Air Rifle Prone SH1 at the XII Paralympic Games
- Paralympic Shooting
- Venue: Markopoulo Olympic Shooting Centre
- Dates: 22 September 2004
- Competitors: 46 from 26 nations
- Winning points: 705.3

Medalists
1st place, gold medalist(s)		Jonas Jacobsson	Sweden
2nd place, silver medalist(s)		Sim Jae Yong	South Korea
3rd place, bronze medalist(s)		Kazimierz Mechula	Denmark

The Mixed 10m Air Rifle Prone SH1 shooting event at the 2004 Summer Paralympics was competed on 22 September. It was won by Jonas Jacobsson, representing Sweden.

== Preliminary ==
Qualified for next round

22 Sept. 2004, 09:00

Rank	Athlete	Points	Notes
1	Jonas Jacobsson (SWE)	600	=WR Q
1	Sim Jae Yong (KOR)	600	=WR Q
1	Thomas Johansson (SWE)	600	=WR Q
1	Azzurra Ciani (ITA)	600	=WR Q
5	Lotta Helsinger (SWE)	599	Q
6	Kazimierz Mechula (DEN)	599	Q
7	Alfred Beringer (GER)	599	Q
8	Aki Terai (JPN)	599	Q
9	Franc Pinter (SLO)	598	
9	Miguel Orobitg (ESP)	598	
9	Victor Firsov (RUS)	598	
9	Bernhard Fendt (GER)	598	
9	Ashley Adams (AUS)	598	
14	Xu Yan Qin (CHN)	597	
14	Veronika Vadovicová (SVK)	597	
14	Andrzej Saluda (POL)	597	
14	Didier Richard (FRA)	597	
14	Erkki Pekkala (FIN)	597	
14	Veikko Palsamaki (FIN)	597	
14	Waldemar Andruszkiewicz (POL)	597	
14	Hasan Akbari Talarposhti (IRI)	597	
22	Chris Trifonidis (CAN)	596	
22	Lauro Pederzoli (ITA)	596	
22	Takashi Matsumoto (JPN)	596	
22	Helmut Mand (EST)	596	
22	Elizabeth Kosmala (AUS)	596	
22	Juerg Kohler (SUI)	596	
22	Jung Jin Owan (KOR)	596	
22	Han Tae Ho (KOR)	596	
22	Cedric Friggeri (FRA)	596	
22	Franz Falke (GER)	596	
22	Enayatollah Bokharaei (IRI)	596	
33	August Wyss (SUI)	595	
33	Colin Willis (NZL)	595	
33	Hans Peter Steffen (SUI)	595	
36	Blaz Beljan (CRO)	594	
36	Lev Makarov (RUS)	594	
38	Glenn Mariash (CAN)	593	
38	Jozef Siroky (SVK)	593	
38	Jolanta Szulc (POL)	593	
41	Werner Mueller (AUT)	592	
41	Narong Chartvet (THA)	592	
43	Claire Priest (GBR)	589	
44	Leung Shui Mai (HKG)	588	
45	Nilda Gómez López (PUR)	586	
46	Daniele de Michiel (ITA)	581	

== Final round ==
22 Sept. 2004, 12:15

Rank	Athlete	Points	Notes
1st place, gold medalist(s)	Jonas Jacobsson (SWE)	705.3	
2nd place, silver medalist(s)	Sim Jae Yong (KOR)	704.3	TIE
3rd place, bronze medalist(s)	Kazimierz Mechula (DEN)	704.3	TIE
4	Thomas Johansson (SWE)	703.9	
5	Alfred Beringer (GER)	703.0	
6	Azzurra Ciani (ITA)	702.9	
7	Aki Terai (JPN)	702.7	TIE
8	Lotta Helsinger (SWE)	702.7	TIE
