= Jessica Smith (swimmer) =

Australian Paralympic swimmer and motivational speaker

Jessica Tace Smith is an Australian Paralympic swimmer and motivational speaker.

== Swimming ==
Smith swam for Australia for seven years and represented Australia at the 2004 Paralympic Games in Athens, Greece.

== Later career ==
Smith began working with the Butterfly Foundation as a body image advocate. She now works professionally as an MC, and motivational and public speaker.

Published in July 2015, Little Miss Jessica Goes to School is a children's book written by Smith as a resource for children with a hand or arm difference.

== Awards ==
In 2017, Smith was named a Cosmopolitan Woman of the Year as a Game Changer.

Smith was awarded an OAM in 2019 for service to the community.

== Personal life ==
Smith was born without her left forearm. As a young child she sustained serious burns to 15% of her body. In her teens she overcame an eating disorder and depression.

Smith married Hamid Salamati, an Iranian-born Scotsman, in 2015 and has three children. She later converted to her husband's religion of Islam, at his family's request. The family currently reside in Dubai.
