= Campbell Message =

Australian wheelchair basketball player

Personal information
- Full name: Campbell Message
- Nickname: Cam
- Nationality: Australia
- Born: 1 January 1975 (age 51) Melbourne, Victoria
Medal record
Wheelchair basketball
Paralympic Games
Silver medal – second place	2004 Athens	Men's wheelchair basketball

Campbell Message (born 1 January 1975) is a wheelchair basketball player from Australia. He was born in Melbourne, Victoria. He was part of the silver medal-winning Australia men's national wheelchair basketball team at the 2004 Summer Paralympics.
