= Tony Naar =

Australian sport administrator

Anthony Naar (born 6 November 1955) is an Australian national volleyball player and sport administrator.

== Personal ==
Naar was born on 6 November 1955. He attended Daramalan College in Canberra. In 1981, he completed a Bachelor of Science degree at the University of Melbourne. He met his wife Susan whilst studying at the University of Melbourne. They have four sons. In 2023, Naar lives in northern Tasmania where he is the president of the Lilydale District Progress Association.

== Volleyball ==
At the age of seventeen, Naar was selected to represent Australia at the 1973 Ocean Volleyball Championships. He then represented Australia at the following major events:

- 1975 – Diplomatic’ tour by the Australian Men's and Women's teams to China. The first large sporting teams to visit China since the Cultural Revolution.
- 1975 – First Asian Championships in Melbourne
- 1976 – 2nd Oceania Volleyball Championships in Nelson, New Zealand
- 1978 – Men's and Women's team tournament in Nouméa, New Caledonia
- 1979 – Second Asian Volleyball Championships for Men in Bahrain
- 1983 – Third Asian Volleyball Championships for Men in Tokyo, Japan

Naar played volleyball in Victoria and South Australia. In 1981 and 1982, he was a member of South Australia's Northern Aurora team that won the National Volleyball League title. In 1991, Volleyball Australia awarded Naar Distinguished Service Award.

== Sport administration ==
In 1984, Naar was the NSW Amateur Volleyball Association's director of coaching. In 1985, Naar became the first full-time ACT Amateur Volleyball Association director of coaching. At the same time, his wife was appointed the association's chief executive officer. Between 1986 and 1989, he was Australian Volleyball Federation's national coaching director. In 1990, he was project manager for the Confederation of Australian Sport. In 1993, he was appointed executive director of ACT Sports House. In 1995, Naar was appointed high-merformance manager for Basketball Australia.

In March 2000, Naar moved to the Australian Paralympic Committee (now Paralympics Australia) to take on a leadership position in the lead up to the 2000 Sydney Paralympics. He left Paralympics Australia in 2015. Whilst at Paralympics Australia, he held managerial positions on four Australian teams at the Summer Paralympics including assistant chef de mission for the 2000 Team. In 2010, he established the Australian Paralympic History Project "to capture, manage and preserve the history of the Paralympic movement in Australia in a way that is relevant, accessible and places the Paralympic movement within its broader social content." The project was awarded funding under the Australian Research Council Linkage Projects scheme in 2014 through its partnership with the University of Queensland. Naar continued to lead the project after leaving Paralympics Australia. He has presented at a number of conferences and forums on Paralympic history, including “Disability Sport: A vehicle for social change?” (Centre for Peace and Reconciliation Studies (CPRS) at Coventry University, 2012), the “International Symposium The Paralympic Movement: Prospect and Legacy of the Tokyo 2020 Paralympic Games” (Tokyo 2015), and “An Inclusive Society Brought About by Paralympic Education: Towards an Understanding of People with Disabilities” (Tokyo 2018)
