= Melinda Young =

Australian wheelchair basketball medalist

Personal information
- Nickname: Min
- Nationality: Australia
- Born: 20 August 1971 (age 54) Melbourne, Victoria
Medal record
Wheelchair basketball
Paralympic Games
Silver medal – second place	2004 Athens	Women's wheelchair basketball

Melinda Jane Young (born 20 August 1971) is a wheelchair basketball player from Australia. She was born in Melbourne, Victoria. She was part of the silver medal-winning Australia women's national wheelchair basketball team at the 2004 Summer Paralympics.
