= Kate Bailey =

Australian Paralympic swimmer

Katherine Bailey
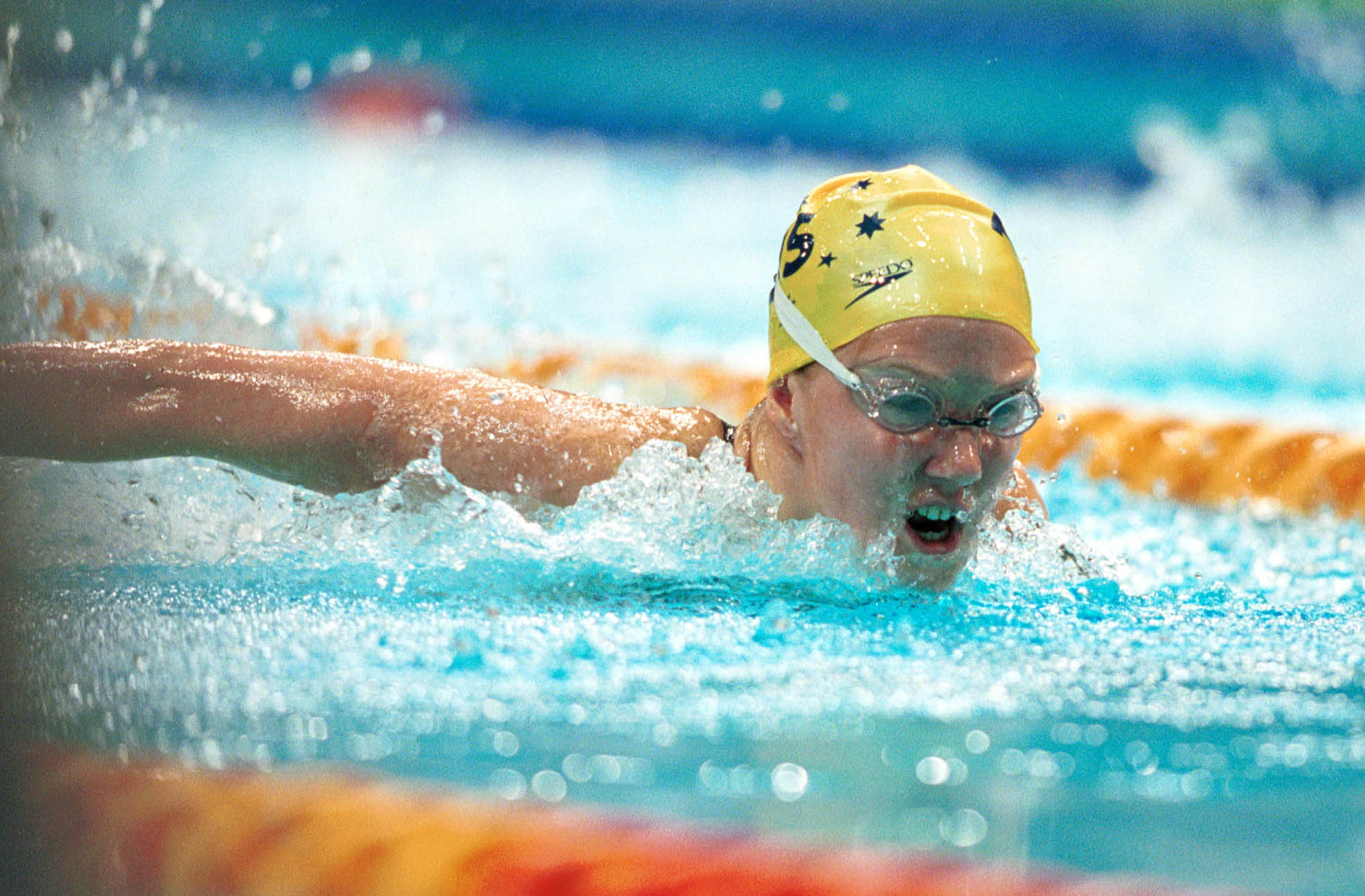
- Action close up of Bailey in the pool during competition at the 2000 Summer Paralympics

Personal information
- Full name: Katherine Bailey
- Nickname: Kate
- Nationality: Australia
- Born: 13 February 1982 (age 44) Sydney, New South Wales
Medal record
Swimming
Paralympic Games
Bronze medal – third place	2000 Sydney	Women's 100 m Butterfly S9
Bronze medal – third place	2000 Sydney	Women's 4x100 m Medley Relay 34 pts
Bronze medal – third place	2004 Athens	Women's 100 m Butterfly S9
Bronze medal – third place	2004 Athens	Women's 4x100 m Medley 34 pts
IPC Swimming World Championships
Silver medal – second place	1998 Christchurch	Women's 200 m Individual Medley SM9
Silver medal – second place	1998 Christchurch	Women's 200 m Butterfly S9
Gold medal – first place	2002 Mar Del Plata	Women's 100 m Butterfly S9
Gold medal – first place	2002 Mar Del Plata	Women's 200 m Individual Medley SM9
Gold medal – first place	2002 Mar Del Plata	Women's 4x100 m Medley Relay 34 pts
Silver medal – second place	2002 Mar Del Plata	Women's 4x100 m Freestyle Relay 34 pts

Katherine "Kate" Bailey (born 13 February 1982) is a Paralympic medalist swimmer from Australia.

She competed in seven events and won two bronze medals at the 2000 Sydney Games in the women's 100 m butterfly S9 and women's 4 × 100 m medley 34 pts events. At the 2004 Athens Games, she competed in four events and repeated her medal results from Sydney winning two bronze medals in the women's 100 m butterfly S9 and women's 4 × 100 m medley 34 pts events. She competed at the 2002 Commonwealth Games in Manchester, England as part of the Australian women's team. At the 2002 IPC Swimming World Championships in Mar Del Plata, Argentina she won three gold medals and one silver medal.

She was coached by Graeme 'Grub' Carroll at the Warringah Aquatic Swim Club. From 2002 to 2005 she was an Australian Institute of Sport paralympic swimming scholarship holder. She was also a New South Wales Institute of Sport scholarship holder.
