= Mandy Drennan =

Australian Paralympic swimmer

Personal information
- Nationality: Australia
- Born: 22 May 1988 (age 38) Cowes, Victoria, Australia
Medal record
Swimming
Paralympic Games
Bronze medal – third place	2004 Athens	Women's 4x100 m Freestyle 34 pts
IPC Swimming World Championships
Gold medal – first place	2002 Mar Del Plata	Women's 4x100m Medley Relay
Silver medal – second place	2002 Mar Del Plata	Women's 4x100m Freestyle Relay

Amanda Drennan (born 22 May 1988) is a Paralympic swimming competitor from Australia. Drennan, who is from Cowes, Victoria, was born without her right leg. She learned to swim as a child on Victoria's Phillip Island but trained in Melbourne several times a week due to the island's lack of facilities. At the age of ten, she competed in her first state championships and a year later represented Australia at the Pacific School Games. In 2000, she was offered a wildcard entry at the 2000 Sydney Paralympic Games but her family and coach decided it was not in her long-term development to accept it.

She competed in the 2002 IPC Swimming Championships in Mar Del Plata, Argentina winning a gold medal in the women's 4 × 100 m medley relay and silver medal in the women's 4 × 100 m freestyle relay. She held an Australian Institute of Sport Paralympic swimming scholarship from 2003 to 2004. She won a bronze medal at the 2004 Athens Games in the Women's 4 × 100 m Freestyle 34 pts event. She competed at the 2008 Beijing Games and did not win a medal.

In 2005, she won the Bass Coast Sportsperson of the Year award. In 2011, she swam 66 km around Phillip Island in a shark cage to raise funds to re-establish Warley Hospital on the Island. Her mother was a nurse at the centre when it closed in 2007. She works as pharmacist in Melbourne.
