= Janelle Lindsay =

Australian Paralympic cycling pilot

Personal information
- Full name: Janelle Mary Lindsay
- Nationality: Australia
- Born: 12 December 1976 (age 49) Bathurst, New South Wales
Medal record
Women's cycling
Representing Australia
Paralympic Games
Gold medal – first place	2004 Athens	Sprint Tandem B1–3
Bronze medal – third place	2004 Athens	1 km Time Trial Tandem B1–3

Janelle Mary Lindsay, OAM (born 12 December 1976) is an Australian Paralympic tandem cycling pilot.

Lindsay piloted Lindy Hou for sprints and kilo events at the 2004 Athens Games. The pair won a gold medal in the Women's Sprint Tandem B1–3 and a bronze medal in the Women's 1 km Time Trial Tandem B1–3 event.
