= Rod Welsh =

Australian Paralympic swimmer

Personal information
- Nationality: Australia
- Born: 11 November 1985 (age 40) Melbourne, Victoria
Medal record
Swimming
Paralympic Games
Silver medal – second place	2004 Athens	Men's 200 m Individual Medley SM10
Bronze medal – third place	2004 Athens	Men's 100 m Backstroke S10

Rod Welsh (born 11 November 1985) is a Paralympic swimming competitor from Australia. He was born in Melbourne, Victoria. He won a silver medal at the 2004 Athens Games in the Men's 200 m Individual Medley SM10 event and a bronze in the Men's 100 m Backstroke S10 event.
