= Lindy Hou =

Australian tandem cyclist and triathlete from Hong Kong

Personal information
- Full name: Lindy Hou
- Nationality: Australia
- Born: 18 February 1960 (age 66) British Hong Kong
Medal record
Representing Australia
Women's para-cycling
Paralympic Games
Gold medal – first place	2004 Athens	Sprint Tandem B1–3
Silver medal – second place	2004 Athens	Road Race / Time Trial Tandem B1–3
Silver medal – second place	2004 Athens	Individual Pursuit Tandem B1–3
Silver medal – second place	2008 Beijing	Individual Pursuit B VI 1–3
Bronze medal – third place	2004 Athens	1 km Time Trial Tandem B1–3
Bronze medal – third place	2008 Beijing	1km Time Trial B VI 1–3
Track and Road World Championships
Gold medal – first place	2006 Aigle	Individual Pursuit B & VI
Gold medal – first place	2006 Aigle	Road Race B & VI
Silver medal – second place	2002 Altenstadt	1000m Time Trial B & VI
Silver medal – second place	2007 Bordeaux	Individual Pursuit B & VI
Bronze medal – third place	2007 Bordeaux	1000m Time Trial B & VI
Bronze medal – third place	2002 Altenstadt	200m Time Trial B & VI
Women's paratriathlon
Oceania Championships
Gold medal – first place	2014 Penrith	PT5

Lindy Hou, OAM (born 18 February 1960) is an Australian tandem cyclist and triathlete from Hong Kong. Arriving in Australia with her family in 1974, she was diagnosed with retinitis pigmentosa in the mid-1980s and became legally blind in 1996. She has won six medals at the 2004 and 2008 Summer Paralympics.

== Personal ==
Hou was born in Hong Kong on 2 March 1960. Her parents, who came from the southern provinces of China, moved to Hong Kong in 1960 and the family emigrated to Australia in 1974. In the mid-1980s, she was diagnosed with retinitis pigmentosa, and she became legally blind in 1996. Before the deterioration of her eyesight, she was a competitive triathlete and triathlon coach, twice competing as an Australian Age Group Representative, and worked in the information technology industry. She lives in Canberra, having previously lived in Sydney, and works as a massage therapist and a motivational speaker. She has served as an Australia Day and Chinese New Year festival ambassador.

== Sport ==
Hou took up tandem cycling in 1999, and first competed in the sport for Australia in 2001. She narrowly missed out on selection for the 2000 Sydney Games. After the games, she created the "Athens Express" Tandem Cycling Team, consisting of her and her pilots Janelle Lindsay for sprints and kilo events and Toireasa Gallagher for pursuit and road races.

At the 2004 Athens Games, she won a gold medal in the Women's Sprint Tandem B1–3 event, for which she received a Medal of the Order of Australia, two silver medals in the Women's Road Race / Time Trial Tandem B1–3 and Women's Individual Pursuit Tandem B1–3 events, and a bronze medal in the Women's 1 km Time Trial Tandem B1–3 event. After the Athens games, Ryan became her only pilot. In 2006, she won two gold medals at the World Cycling Championships. At the 2008 Beijing Games, she won a silver medal in the Women's Individual Pursuit B VI 1–3 event and a bronze medal in the Women's 1 km Time Trial B VI 1–3 event. She retired from Paralympic cycling after the Beijing games, and was named the Female Para-Cyclist of the Year for 2008 at the Cycling Australia Awards. She has been on five long-distance bike rides for charities, including one for Retina Australia from the Gold Coast to Sydney in September 2011.

Returning to her first sport of triathlon, she was selected to represent Australia at the 2012 ITU Paratriathlon World Championships, racing in the TRI-6 (visually impaired) classification. She withdrew due to injury. The sole female TRI-6 competitor in the inaugural Australian Paratriathlon Championships, held in January 2013, Hou was selected to race in the 2013 ITU Triathlon World Championships in London, where she and guide Maureen Cummings carried the Australian flag during the opening ceremony. She did not medal in the race. At the 2014 Australian and Oceania championships, Hou won her classification.

Along with Michael Milton, she is one of two athlete members of the Triathlon Australia Paratriathlon Committee, which aims to develop the sport following its inclusion in the 2016 Rio de Janeiro Paralympics.
