= Anne Skinner =

Australian equestrian

Personal information
- Nationality: Australia
- Born: 14 February 1954 (age 72)

Sport
- Sport: Para-equestrian

Anne Skinner (born 14 February 1954) is an Australian para-equestrian. She represented Australia at the 2000 Sydney Paralympics and 2004 Athens Paralympics.

== Personal life ==
On 19 September 1997 Anne Skinner was involved in a serious accident that changed her life forever. Skinner was distracted as she got out of her car to unhitch her horse float, accidentally leaving her car running and in reverse, and as Skinner unhooked the trailer, the car engaged and reversed approximately seven to eight meters backwards, crushing her within the eight inches between the ground and the car. Skinner was trapped for approximately 2 hours before her husband Rex and 17-year-old son Tim returned home and came to her aid. Skinner was flown to The Alfred Hospital in Melbourne where she underwent emergency surgery and was placed in an induced coma for seven weeks. With spinal and pelvic injuries so complex, a team of orthopedic surgeons had to reconnect them during a surgery that took 9 weeks of planning. Skinner's spinal cord hadn't been severed during the accident, only damaged, leaving her without feeling from waist down up until her surgery. After surgery all feeling had returned in her right leg, however she was still without feeling in her left and some nerve damage.

== Equestrian career ==
For most of Skinner's life she wanted to own her own horse. When she was 17 years old that she purchased her first horse, an old paint horse named Terror, that she picked up for $100. Skinner started an affiliated pony club and enjoyed assisting inexperienced riders. Skinner commenced with the Riding for Disabled Association of Victoria (RDA), as a state coach in 1989. She later qualified as Equestrian Australia (EA) coach, with RDA

== Achievements ==
- 1999 riding for the disabled Australia National Championships. – 1st /champion
- 2000 Sydney Paralympic games. – 9th
- 2001 RDAV State Championships. – 1st /champion
- 2002 RDAV national championships. – 1st /champion
- 2003 RDAV national championships. – 1st /champion
- 2003 Belgium Moorsele world equestrian games for disabilities. - 2nd
- 2004 Athens Paralympic games. – 9th
- 2005 RDAA national dressage championships. – 1st /champion
- 2006 RDAA national dressage championships. – 1st /champion
- 2007 Belgium Moorsele world equestrian games for disabilities. – 10th
- 2008 Equestrian Australia National Dressage. – 3rd
- 2009 RDAV state championships. – Champion
- 2010 Equestrian Australia National Dressage. – 3rd
- 2011 National Masters Games /combined Training. – 1st
- 2011 Equestrian Australia National dressage Championships. – 3rd
- 2012 dressage festival – Werribee. – 3rd
- 2013 Equestrian Australia dressage National Championships. – 3rd
- 2013 dressage festival – Werribee. – 2nd
- 2014 Boneo CDPEI. – 2nd
- 2014 Equestrian Australia national dressage championships. – 2nd
- 2014 Boneo Para Equestrian Championships. – 2nd
- 2014 dressage festival – Werribee. – 2nd
- 2015 Sydney CDI. – 2nd
- 2015 Equestrian Australia national dressage championships. – Reserve Champion
- 2015 Boneo Para equestrian Championships. – 2nd
- 2015 Hartpury England – 4th team
- 2016 Sydney CDPEI. – Champion
- 2016 Boneo Para Equestrian Championships. – 2nd
- 2017 Boneo Para Equestrian Championships. – 1st
