= Fabio Triboli =

Italian paralympic cyclist (born 1966)

Personal information
- Born: 16 May 1966 (age 60) Lecco, Italy

Sport
- Country: Italy
- Sport: Para-cycling
- Club: Fiamme Azzurre
Medal record
Event	1st	2nd	3rd
Paralympic Games	1	1	3
World Championships	0	1	3
European Championships	0	2	3
Total	1	4	9

Fabio Triboli (born 16 May 1966) is an Italian male paralympic athlete who won medals at the Paralympic Games.
