= Kelly McCombie =

Australian Paralympic cyclist

Personal information
- Nationality: Australia
- Born: 4 January 1979 (age 47) Sydney
Medal record
Cycling
Paralympic Games
Bronze medal – third place	2004 Athens	Women's Road Race / Time Trial Tandem B1-3
Bronze medal – third place	2004 Athens	Women's Individual Pursuit Tandem B1-3

Kelly McCombie (born 4 January 1979) is an Australian Paralympic tandem cycling pilot. She was born in Sydney and lives in Perth. She began cycling in 1996 and went on to pilot visually impaired tandem cyclist Janet Shaw. At the Australian Championships before the 2004 Athens Paralympics, McCombie and her tandem partner broke two world records, including the 3 km pursuit, smashing 3 seconds off the world record time. The pair won two bronze medals at the 2004 Athens Games in the Women's Road Race / Time Trial Tandem B1-3 and the Women's Individual Pursuit Tandem B1-3.
