= Greg Ball (cyclist) =

Australian Paralympic cyclist

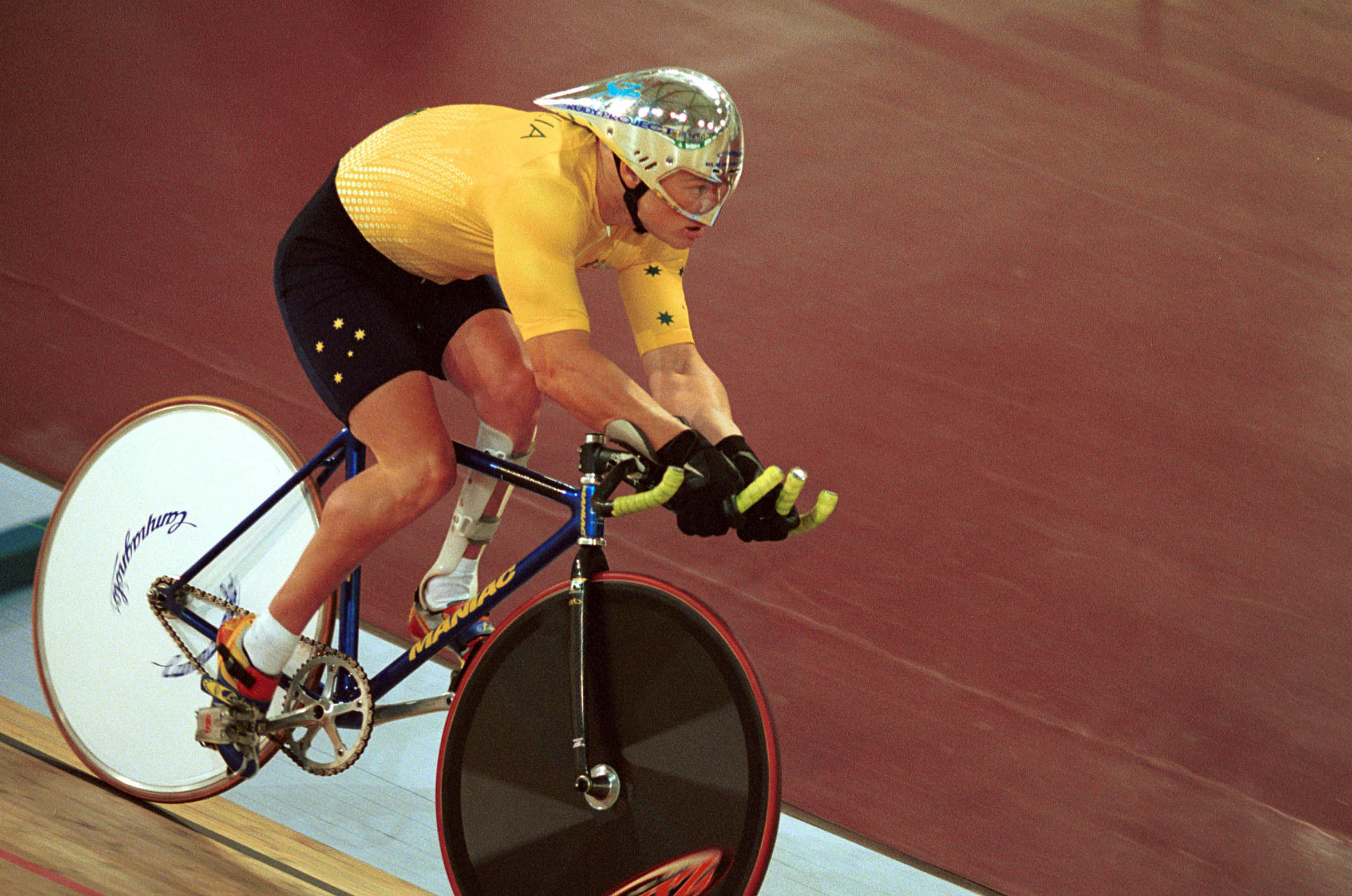
- Action shot of Ball during 2000 Summer Paralympics

Personal information
- Full name: Gregory Ian Ball
- Nationality: Australia
- Born: 29 May 1974 (age 52) Ipswich, Queensland
Medal record
Cycling
Paralympic Games
Gold medal – first place	2000 Sydney	mixed Olympic Sprint LC1–3
Gold medal – first place	2004 Athens	Men's 1 km Time Trial Bicycle LC1–4
Gold medal – first place	2004 Athens	Men's Team Sprint LC1–4/CP 3/4
Bronze medal – third place	2008 Beijing	Men's 1 km Time Trial Bicycle LC3–4
IPC Track and Road World Championships
Gold medal – first place	1998 Colorado Springs	Mixed Time Trial LC4
Gold medal – first place	1998 Colorado Springs	Mixed Team Sprint LC1-4/CP Div 3-4
Gold medal – first place	1998 Colorado Springs	Mixed Road Race LC4
Gold medal – first place	1998 Colorado Springs	Mixed Road Race LC4
Gold medal – first place	2002 Altenstadt	Men's 1000 m Time Trial LC4
Gold medal – first place	2002 Altenstadt	Men's Team Sprint LC1–4/CP 3/4
Gold medal – first place	2007 Bordeaux	Men's 1000 m Time Trial LC4
Bronze medal – third place	1998 Colorado Springs	Mixed Individual Pursuit LC4

Gregory "Greg" Ian Ball, OAM (born 29 May 1974) is an Australian Paralympic cyclist.

== Personal ==
Ball was born in Ipswich, Queensland on 29 May 1974, and was diagnosed with transverse myelitis.

== Career ==
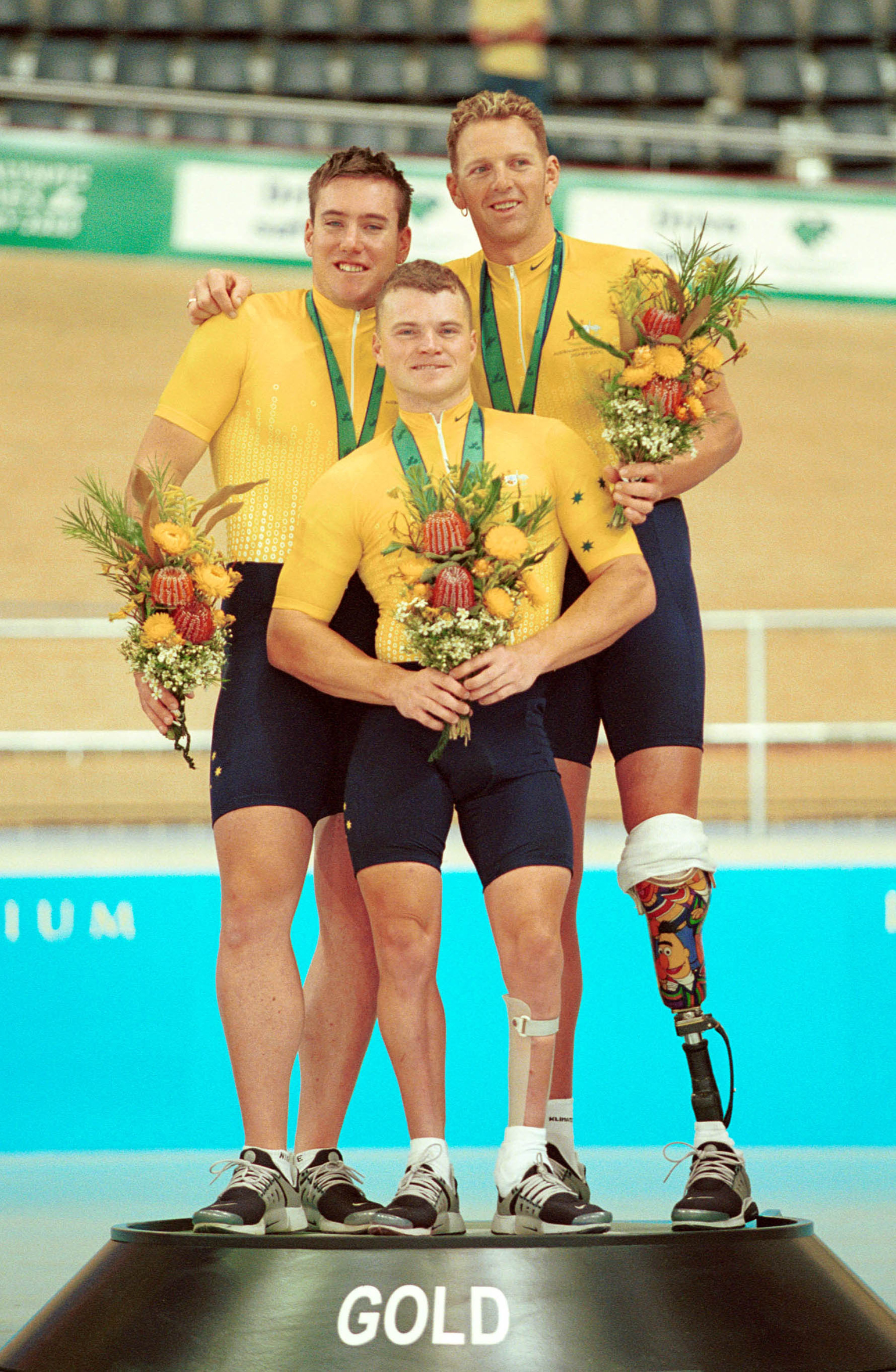
Ball with his cycling team members Matthew Gray and Paul Lake, shown on the podium with their gold medals won at the 2000 Summer Paralympics Olympic Sprint

Ball first competed for Australia in 1998, winning and breaking the world record in the 1 km time trial at the World Titles in that year. He won a gold medal at the 2000 Sydney Games in the mixed Olympic Sprint LC1–3 event, for which he received a Medal of the Order of Australia. In 2002, he once again won the 1 km time trial event at the World Titles. At the 2004 Athens Games, he won two gold medals in the Men's 1 km Time Trial Bicycle LC1–4 and Men's Team Sprint LC1–4/CP 3/4 events. At the 2008 Beijing Games, he won a bronze medal in the Men's 1 km Time Trial LC3–4 event.

On 4 February 2011, he broke a world record in the C1 men's 1 km time trial at the Scody Cycling Australia Track National Championships; it was the fastest time since a change in the classification system in 2010. He voluntarily took a drug test to ensure the validation of his record, and tested positive for the banned substance stanozolol, an anabolic steroid. He was provisionally suspended on 9 March 2011, and on 26 October 2011, the Australian Sports Anti-Doping Authority (ASADA) announced that it had acknowledged the two-year ban imposed on Ball by Cycling Australia, backdated to the date of the provisional suspension. The ban prevented him from participating in the 2012 London Paralympics. He was also ordered to pay back $27,500 in grants to the Australian Sports Commission, and was stripped of his February 2011 world record. Ball said that taking the steroids was an honest mistake that had devastated him. In his submission to ASADA, he said that he had been suffering depression for the previous twelve months and admitted that he had taken "up to four tablets, the name and exact constituents of which he did not know at the time (and still does not know), obtained from a close friend"; he said that he believed the tablets were vitamins that would help him to recover from depression.
