= Marita Hird =

Australian equestrian (born 1971)

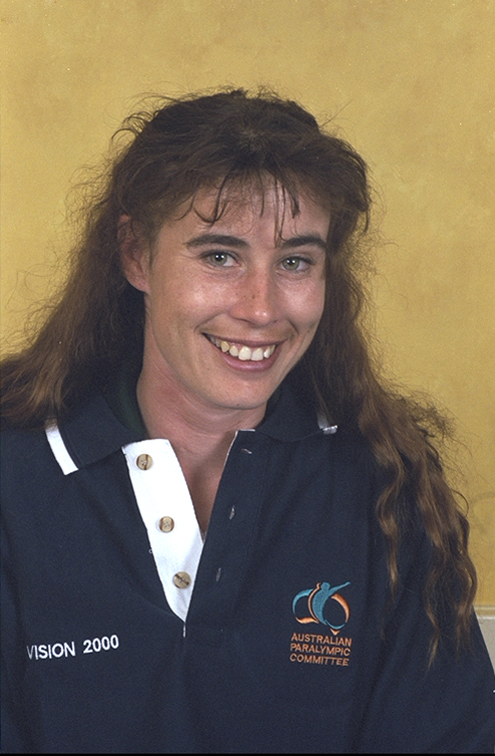
- 2000 Australian Paralympic team portrait of Hird

Personal information
- Nationality: Australia
- Born: 25 February 1971 (age 55) Kew, Victoria, Australia
Medal record
Para equestrian
Representing Australia
Paralympic Games
Bronze medal – third place	2000 Sydney	Mixed Dressage; Freestyle grade III

Marita Hird (born 25 February 1971) is a Paralympic equestrian competitor from Australia. She won a bronze medal at the 2000 Sydney Games in the Mixed Dressage – Freestyle grade III event.

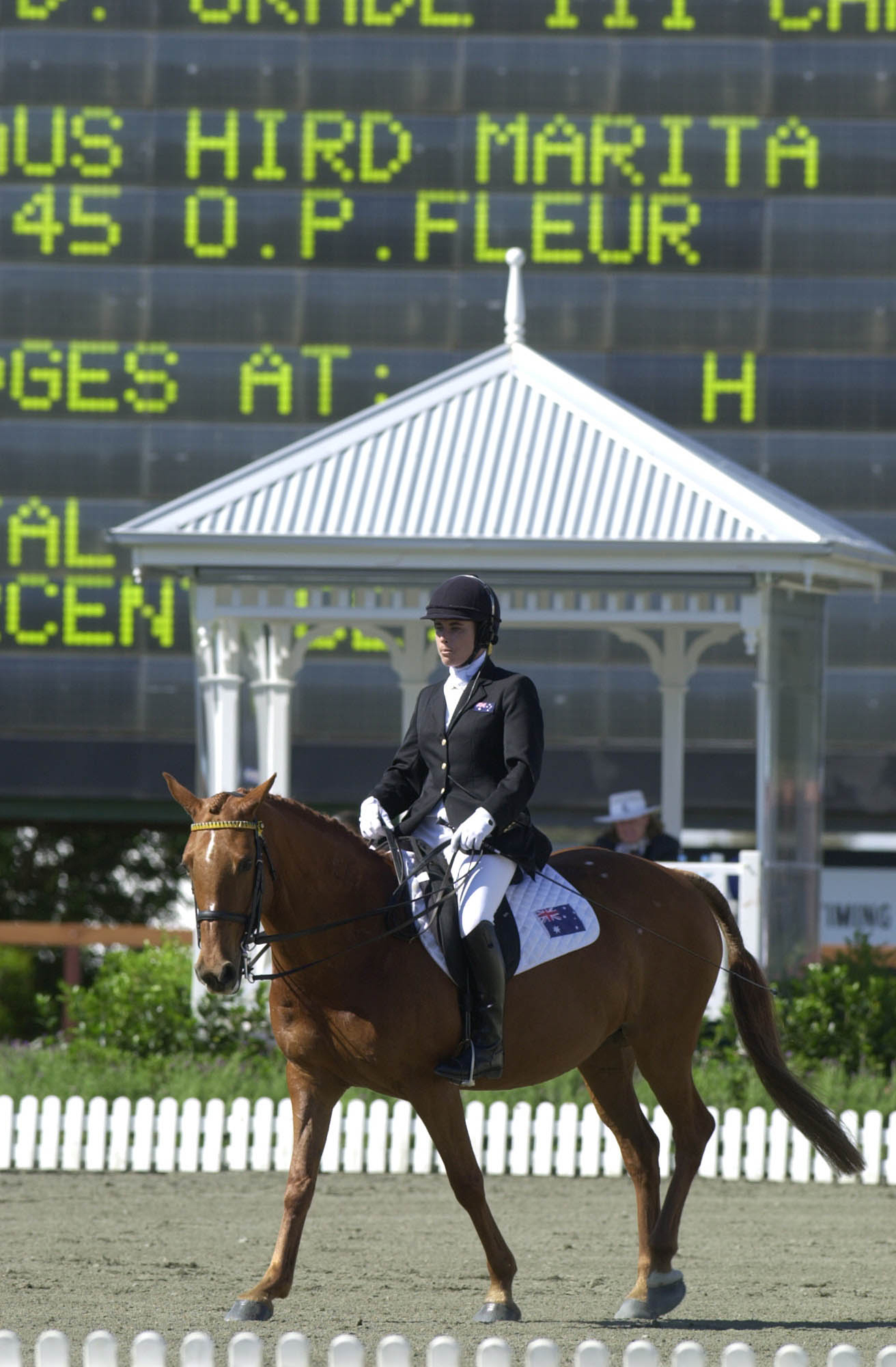
Action shot of Hird, shown on her horse O.P. Fleur, at the 2000 Summer Paralympics

== Personal ==
Hird was born in Kew, Victoria. She was a jockey until 1993 when she fell from her horse during a race. Hird broke her neck in three places and was advised that she was an incomplete quadriplegic. However, after nine months Hird learned to walk again and began riding horses as a form of therapy.

== Sporting career ==
After being encouraged to compete in dressage, Hird won bronze at the World Championships in Aarhus Denmark. She went on to win bronze in the Mixed Dressage - Freestyle grade III event at the 2000 Paralympics in Sydney. Hird also represented Australia at the 2004 Paralympics where she just missed out on a medal. At the 2006 Pacific Rim Championships, held in Vancouver, Hird won three silver medals. She credits some of her success to Manolo Mendez, who gave her guidance.
