= Peter Homann =

Australian Paralympic cyclist

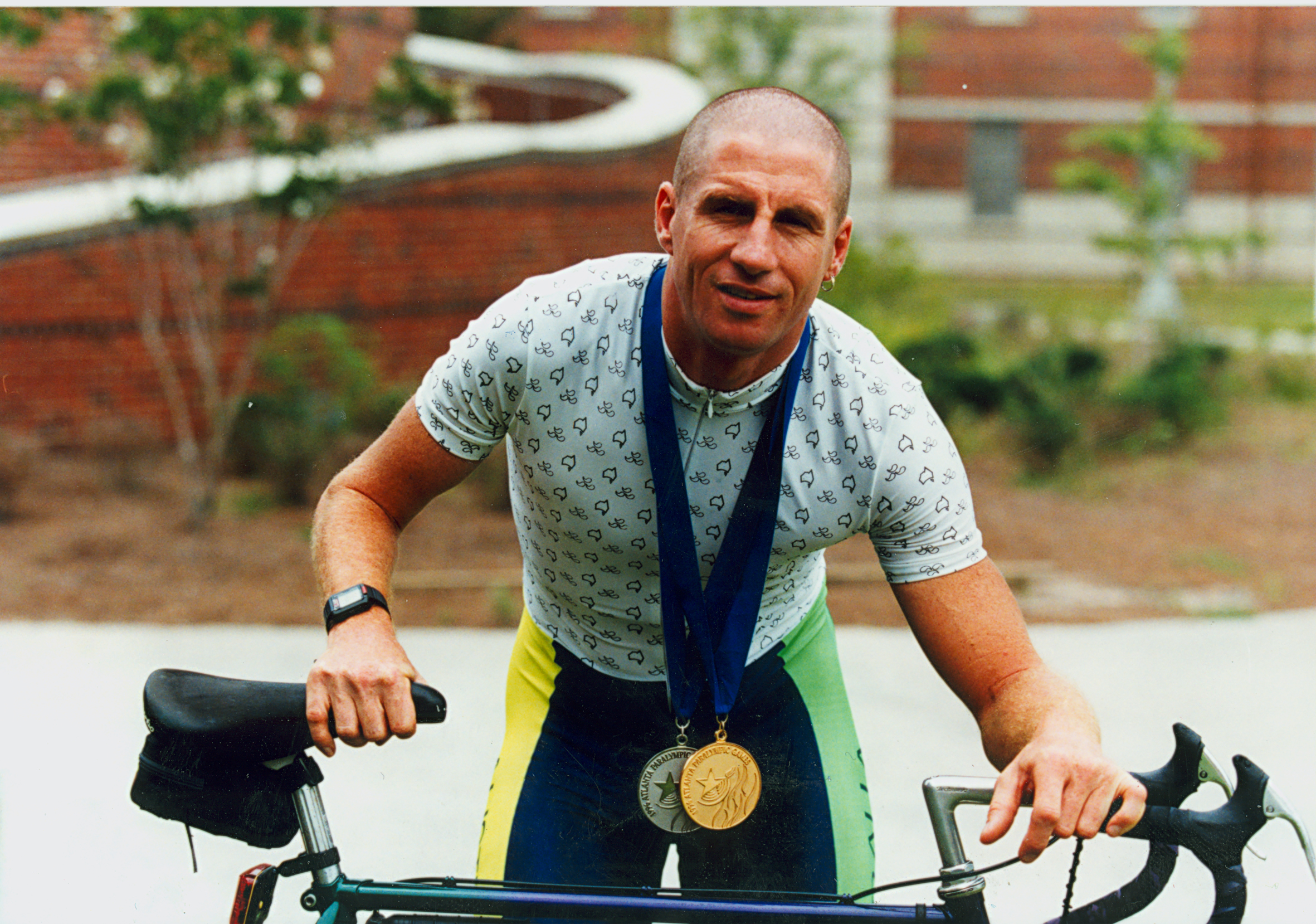
- Peter Homann wearing his 1996 Summer Paralympics medals

Personal information
- Full name: Peter David Homann
- Nickname: 'H'
- Nationality: Australia
- Born: 16 February 1960 (age 66) Yallourn, Victoria
Medal record
Cycling
Paralympic Games
Gold medal – first place	1996 Atlanta	Mixed 20k Bicycle CP Div 4
Gold medal – first place	2000 Sydney	Mixed Bicycle Road Race CP Div 4
Gold medal – first place	2004 Athens	Men's Team Sprint LC1-4/CP 3/4
Silver medal – second place	1996 Atlanta	Mixed 5,000 m Time Trial Bicycle CP Div 4
Silver medal – second place	2004 Athens	Men's Road Race / Time Trial Bicycle CP Div 4
Silver medal – second place	2004 Athens	Men's Individual Pursuit Bicycle CP Div 4
Bronze medal – third place	2000 Sydney	Mixed Bicycle Time Trial CP Div 4
IPC Track and Road World Championships
Gold medal – first place	1994 Hasselt	Men's 5000m CP4
Gold medal – first place	1994 Hasselt	Men's 20000m CP4
Gold medal – first place	1998 Colorado Springs	Mixed Individual Pursuit CP4
Gold medal – first place	1998 Colorado Springs	Mixed Time Trial CP4
Gold medal – first place	1998 Colorado Springs	Mixed Road Race CP4
Silver medal – second place	1998 Colorado Springs	Mixed Road Time Trial CP4

Peter David Homann, OAM (born 16 February 1960) is a former Australian Paralympic cyclist. He has won seven medals at three Games from 1996 to 2004.

== Personal ==
Homann was born with cerebral palsy on 16 February 1960 in the Victorian town of Yallourn. When he was three, his father, a pharmacist, moved the family to the New Guinean town of Wewak, where he ran the local pharmacy. In a 2000 interview, Homann said of his childhood in the town:

There was no television, no radio. You had to go out and do physical things and I got involved in a lot of sport. It was fantastic. We lived right on the beach and did a lot of swimming and surfing and sailing. It was a very active childhood and I think that's one of the reasons I've overcome my disability.

He moved to Melbourne to finish high school and university, and later lived in the United Kingdom for four years, where he took up cycling recreationally. He continued cycling when he moved back to Australia, and was interested in the 1992 Barcelona Paralympics.

== Career ==
Homann's first international competition was the 1994 European championships, where he won two gold medals. In 1995, he won the European championships and was a finalist for Paralympian of the Year.

At the 1996 Atlanta Games, he won a gold medal in the Mixed 20k Bicycle CP Div 4 event, for which he received a Medal of the Order of Australia, and a silver medal in the Mixed 5,000 m Time Trial Bicycle CP Div 4 event. At the 1998 world championships, he broke two world records in the 3,000 m individual pursuit and kilometre time trial, and won the road race. At the 2000 Sydney Games, he won a gold medal in the Mixed Bicycle Road Race CP Div 4 event and a bronze medal in the Mixed Bicycle Time Trial CP Div 4 event. That year, he received an Australian Sports Medal.

At the 2004 Athens Games in the Men's Team Sprint LC1-4/CP 3/4 event, cycling team captain Christopher Scott relinquished his place in the team in the finals so that Homann could get a chance to win a gold medal at his last Paralympics; the Australian team won the event so he received the gold medal along with Scott and the rest of the team. In a 2008 interview, Scott said of this action: "I already had my gold medal. It's what you do in a team. Peter deserved his chance on the podium." Homann also won two silver medals in the Men's Road Race / Time Trial Bicycle CP Div 4 and Men's Individual Pursuit Bicycle CP Div 4 events at the 2004 Games. In 2008, he was inducted into the International Paralympic Committee Paralympic Hall of Fame. He was an Australian Institute of Sport scholarship holder in 1997 and 1999.

In 2026, Homann was inducted into the Australian Cycling Hall of Fame.
