= Peter Brooks (cyclist) =

Australian Paralympic cyclist

Personal information
- Full name: Peter Graham Brooks
- Nationality: Australia
- Born: 28 June 1970 (age 55) Sydney, New South Wales
Medal record
Cycling
Paralympic Games
Gold medal – first place	2004 Athens	Men's Individual Pursuit Bicycle LC1
Gold medal – first place	2004 Athens	Men's Team Sprint LC1-4/CP 3/4
Bronze medal – third place	2004 Athens	Men's Road Race / Time Trial Bicycle LC1
IPC Track and Road World Championships
Bronze medal – third place	2002 Altenstadt	Men's 1000 m Time Trial LC1

Peter Graham Brooks, OAM (born 28 June 1970) is an Australian Paralympic cyclist. He was born in Sydney, New South Wales. At the 2004 Athens Games, he won two gold medals in the Men's Individual Pursuit Bicycle LC1 and Men's Team Sprint LC1–4/CP 3/4 events, for which he received a Medal of the Order of Australia, and a bronze medal in the Men's Road Race / Time Trial Bicycle LC1 event.
