= List of Australian Paralympic cycling medalists =

Cycling has been contested at the Summer Paralympic Games since 1984. Australia first competed at the Seoul Games and won its first cycling medals at the Atlanta Games. Cycling is Australia's third most successful Paralympic medal sport behind athletics and swimming.

== Leading medalists ==
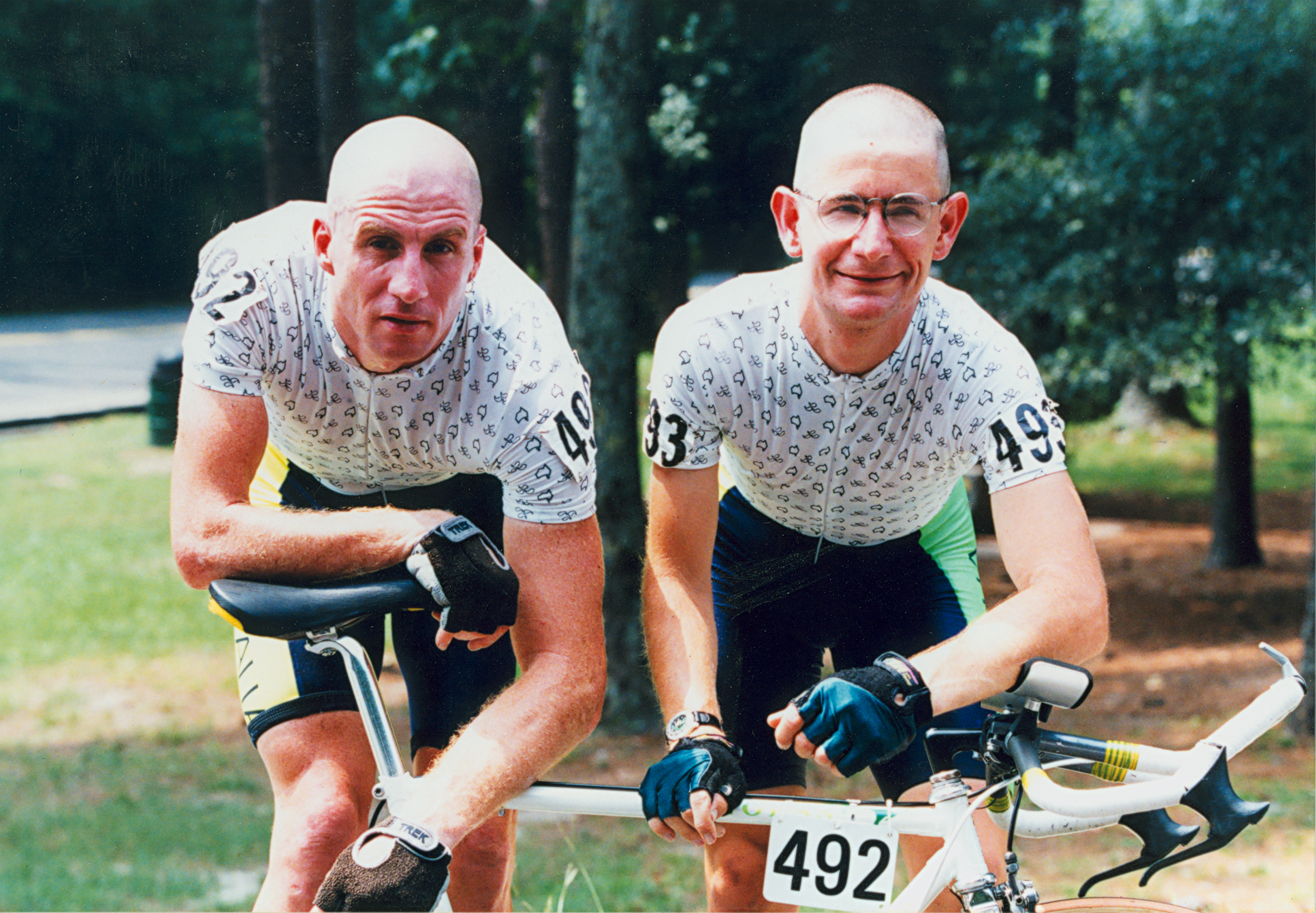
Peter Homman (left) and Chris Scott at the 1996 Atlanta Paralympic Games

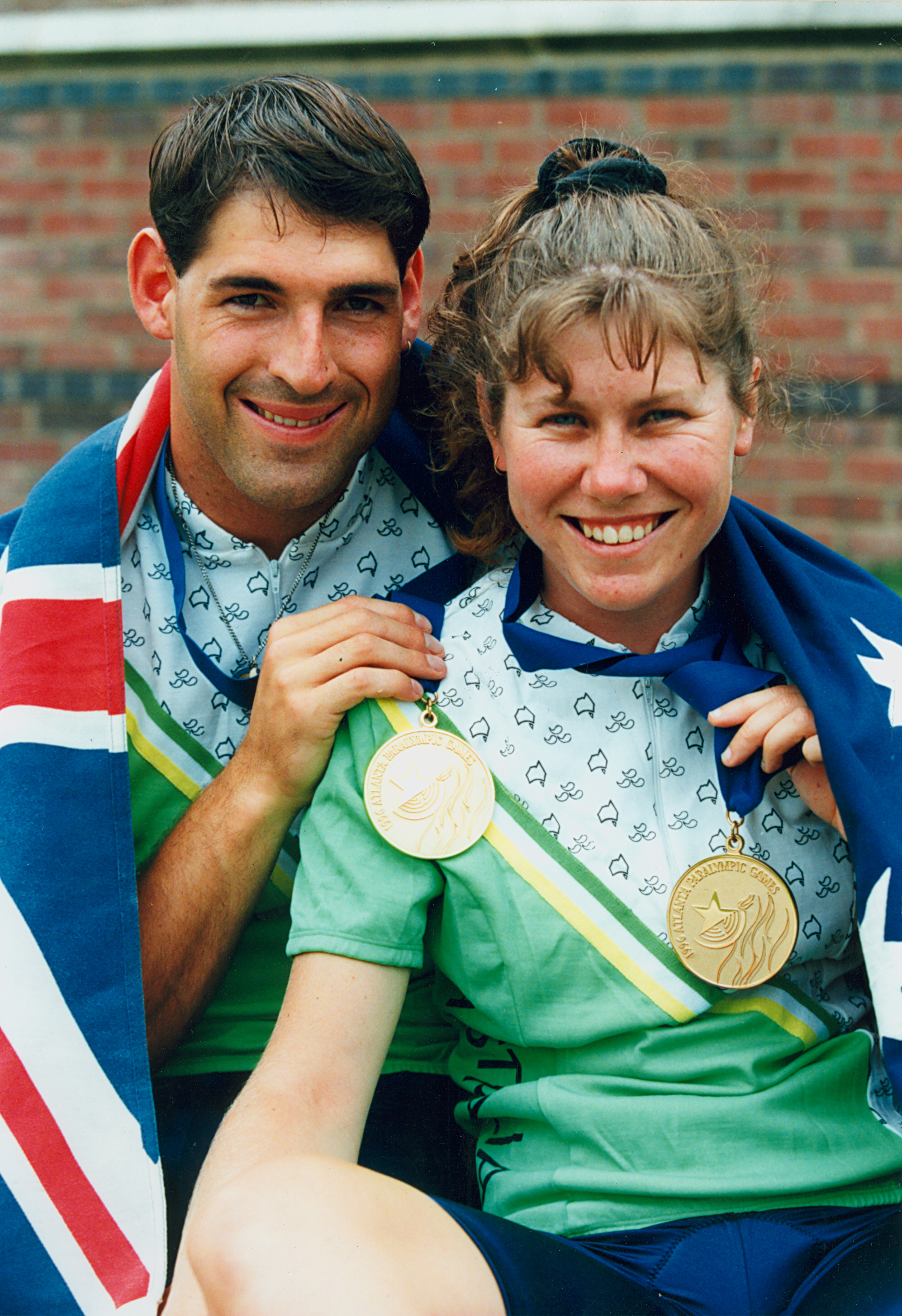
Kieran Modra (left) and pilot Kerry Golding at the 1996 Atlanta Paralympic Games

As of the 2012 Games.

Athlete	Gold	Silver	Bronze	Total
Christopher Scott	6	2	2	10
Kieran Modra	5	0	2	7
Peter Homann	3	3	1	7
Lindy Hou	1	3	2	6
Greg Ball	3	0	1	4
Mark le Flohic	1	1	1	4
Michael Gallager	2	0	2	4
Paul Lake	1	2	1	4
Toireasa Gallagher	0	3	1	4
Matthew Gray	2	1	0	3
Peter Brooks	2	0	1	3
Tania Modra	2	0	0	2
Sarnya Parker	2	0	0	2
Teresa Poole	2	0	0	2
Sandra Smith	2	0	0	2
Ben Demery	2	0	0	2
Shaun Hopkins	2	0	0	2
Felicity Johnson	1	1	0	2
Susan Powell	1	1	0	2
David Nicholas	1	0	1	2
Jayme Paris	0	0	2	2

== Summer Paralympic Games ==
=== 1996 ===
Australia won 5 gold and 5 silver medals.

Medal	Name	Event
Gold	Christopher Scott	Mixed 5000 m time trial bicycle CP4
Gold	Peter Homann	Mixed 20k bicycle CP4
Gold	Kerry Golding, Kieran Modra	Mixed 200 m sprint tandem open
Gold	Sandra Smith, Teresa Poole	Women's time trial tandem open
Gold	Sandra Smith, Teresa Poole	Women's individual pursuit tandem open
Silver	Peter Homann	Mixed 5000 m time trial bicycle CP4
Silver	Christopher Scott	Mixed 20k bicycle CP4
Silver	Eddy Hollands, Paul Clohessy	Men's individual pursuit tandem open
Silver	Matthew Gray	Mixed omnium LC1
Silver	Paul Lake	Mixed omnium LC2

=== 2000 ===
Australia won 10 gold, 3 silver and 8 bronze medals.

Medal	Name	Event
Gold	Greg Ball, Matthew Gray, Paul Lake	Mixed Olympic Team Sprint LC1-LC3
Gold	Paul Clohessy, Darren Harry	Men's tandem sprint open
Gold	Matthew Gray	Mixed 1km time trial LC1
Gold	Sarnya Parker, Tania Modra	Women's individual pursuit tandem open
Gold	Sarnya Parker, Tania Modra	Women's 1 km time trial tandem open
Gold	Peter Homann	Mixed bicycle road race CP div 4
Gold	Daniel Polson	Mixed bicycle road race LC2
Gold	Christopher Scott	Mixed bicycle time trial CP div 4
Gold	Lyn Lepore, Lynette Nixon	Women's tandem road race open
Gold	Mark le Flohic	Mixed tricycle 5.4 km time trial CP div 2
Silver	Paul O'Neill	Mixed bicycle road race LC1
Silver	Lyn Lepore, Lynette Nixon	Women's 1 km time trial tandem open
Silver	Paul Lake	Mixed individual pursuit LC2
Bronze	Christopher Scott	Mixed bicycle road race CP div 4
Bronze	Peter Homann	Mixed bicycle time trial CP div 4
Bronze	Mark le Flohic	Mixed tricycle 1.9 km time trial CP div 2
Bronze	Paul O'Neill	Mixed 1 km time trial LC1
Bronze	Paul Lake	Mixed 1 km time trial LC2
Bronze	Eddie Hollands, Paul Clohessy	Men's 1 km time trial tandem open
Bronze	Paul O'Neill	Mixed individual pursuit LC1
Bronze	Lyn Lepore, Lynette Nixon	Women's individual pursuit tandem open

=== 2004 ===
Australia won 10 gold, 7 silver and 7 bronze medals.

Medal	Name	Event
Gold	Christopher Scott	Men's bicycle road race/time trial CP4
Gold	Christopher Scott	Men's bicycle 3 km individual pursuit CP4
Gold	Mark le Flohic	Men's tricycle road race CP 1/2
Gold	Greg Ball	Men's bicycle 1 km time trial LC 1-4
Gold	Anthony Biddle, Kial Stewart	Men's tandem 1 km time trial B1-3
Gold	Peter Brooks	Men's bicycle 4 km individual pursuit LC1
Gold	Kieran Modra, Robert Crowe	Men's tandem 4 km individual pursuit B1-3
Gold	Kieran Modra, David Short	Men's tandem sprint B1-3
Gold	Greg Ball, Peter Brook, Christopher Scott	Men's bicycle team sprint LC 1-4&CP 3/4
Gold	Lindy Hou, Janelle Lindsay	Women's tandem sprint B 1-3
Silver	Peter Homann	Men's bicycle road race/time trial CP4
Silver	Mark le Flohic	Men's tricycle time trial CP1/2
Silver	Claire McLean	Women's bicycle time trial LC 1-4&CP 3/4
Silver	Lindy Hou, Toireasa Ryan	Women's tandem road race/time trial B1-3
Silver	Andrew Panazzolo	Men's bicycle 1 km time trial CP3/4
Silver	Peter Homann	Men's bicycle 3 km individual pursuit CP4
Silver	Lindy Hou, Toireasa Ryan	Women's tandem 3 km individual pursuit B1-3
Bronze	Peter Brooks	Men's bicycle road race/time trial LC1
Bronze	Kieran Modra, Robert Crowe	Men's tandem road race/time trial B1-3
Bronze	Kelly McCombie, Janet Shaw	Women's tandem road race/time trial B1-3
Bronze	Andrew Panazzolo	Men's bicycle 3 km individual pursuit CP3
Bronze	Anthony Biddle, Kial Stewart	Men's tandem sprint B1-3
Bronze	Lindy Hou, Janelle Lindsay	Women's tandem 1 km time trial B1-3
Bronze	Kelly McCombie, Janet Shaw	Women's tandem 3 km individual pursuit B1-3

=== 2008 ===
Australia won 3 gold, 5 silver and 7 bronze medals.

Medal	Name	Event
Gold	Michael Gallagher	Men's individual pursuit LC1
Gold	Kieran Modra, Tyson Lawrence	Men's individual pursuit B&VI
Gold	Christopher Scott	Men's individual pursuit CP4
Silver	Christopher Scott	Men's road time trial CP4
Silver	Ben Demery, Shaun Hopkins	Men's 1km time trial B&VI
Silver	Ben Demery, Shaun Hopkins	Men's sprint (B&VI 1–3)
Silver	Lindy Hou, Toireasa Gallagher	Individual pursuit B&VI 1–3
Silver	Felicity Johnson, Katie Parker	Women's 1km time trial (B&VI 1–3)
Bronze	Lindy Hou, Toireasa Gallagher	Women's 1km time trial B&VI 1–3
Bronze	Kieran Modra, Tyson Lawrence	Men's 1km time trial B&VI 1–3
Bronze	Bryce Lindores, Steven George	Men's individual pursuit B&VI 1–3
Bronze	Jayme Paris	Women's 500m time trial LC3–4/CP 3
Bronze	Christopher Scott	Men's 1km time trial CP 4
Bronze	Greg Ball	Men's 1km time trial LC 3–4
Bronze	Michael Gallagher	Men's road race LC 1–2/CP 4

=== 2012 ===
Australia won 6 gold, 4 silver and 4 bronze medals.

Medal	Name	Event
Gold	Carol Cooke	Mixed T 1-2 Road Time Trial
Gold	Felicity Johnson, Stephanie Morton (pilot)	Women's 1km time trial B
Gold	Susan Powell	Women's individual pursuit C4
Gold	Kieran Modra, Scott McPhee (pilot)	Men's individual pursuit B
Gold	David Nicholas	Men's Individual C 3 Road Time Trial
Gold	Michael Gallagher	Men's Individual C5 Pursuit
Silver	Simone Kennedy	Women's individual pursuit C1-3
Silver	Susan Powell	Women's Individual C 4 Road Time Trial
Silver	Nigel Barley	Men's Individual H 3 Road Time Trial
Silver	Bryce Lindores, Sean Finning (pilot)	Men's individual pursuit B
Bronze	Alexandra Green	Women's individual pursuit C4
Bronze	Jayme Paris	Women's Individual C1-2-3 500m Time Trial
Bronze	Michael Gallagher	Men's Individual C 5 Road Time Trial
Bronze	David Nicholas	Men's Individual C1-3 Road Race

== See also ==
- Australian Paralympic Cycling Team
- Cycling at the Summer Paralympics
- Australia at the Paralympics
