= Australian Paralympic Cycling Team =

Australian National Paralympic Team

Cycling has been contested at the Summer Paralympic Games since 1984. Australia first competed at the Seoul Games and won its first cycling medals at the Atlanta Games. Australia was the number one ranked nation at the 1996, 2000 and 2004 Games.

Notable Australian athlete performances:

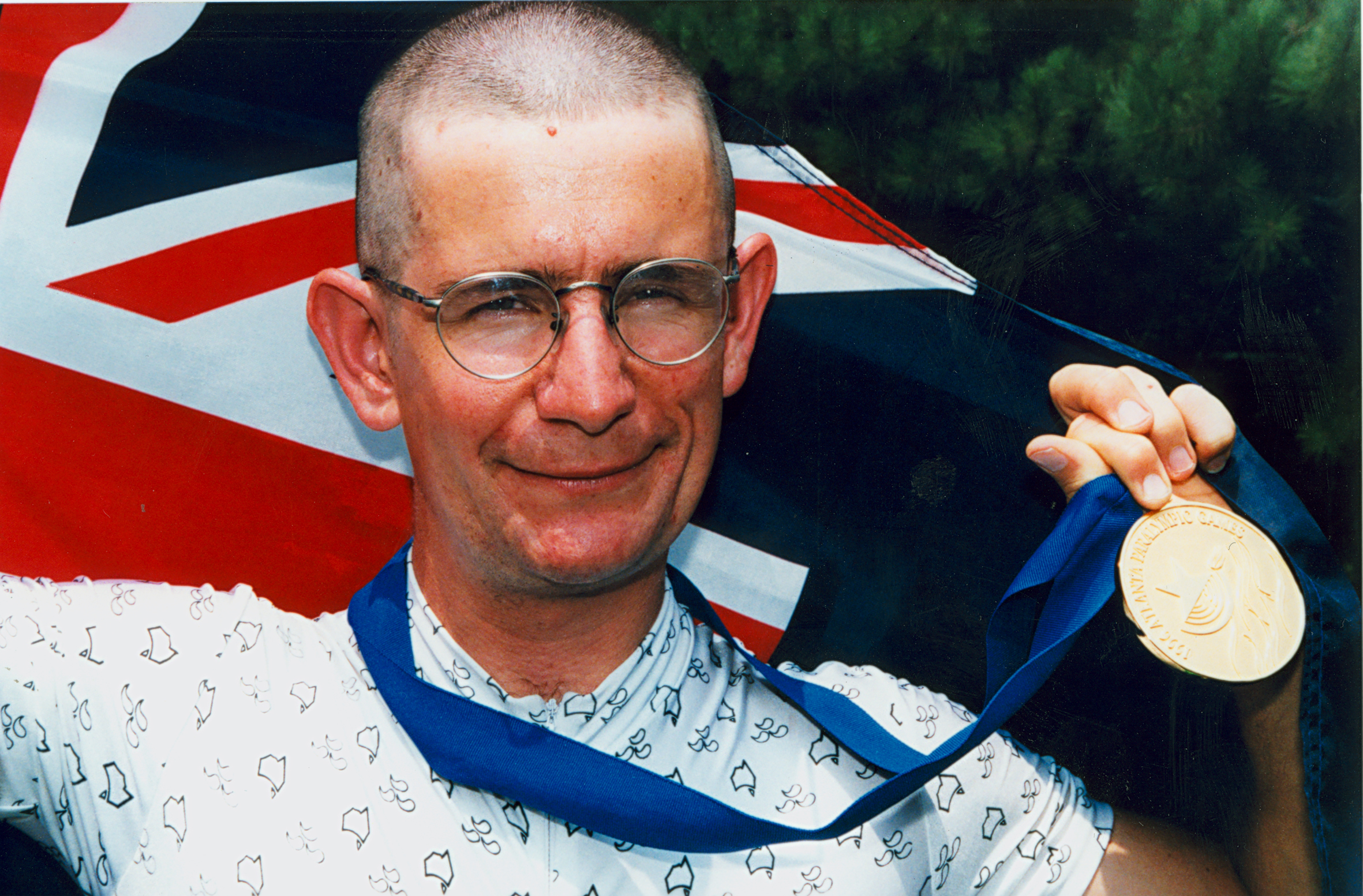
Chris Scott gold medalist at the 1996 Atlanta Paralympic Games

- Christopher Scott, a cerebral palsy athlete, has won 10 medals (6 gold, 2 silver, and 2 bronze medals) as a cyclist at four Games 1996 to 2008. He also competed at the 1988 and 1992 in football and athletics.
- Peter Homann, a cerebral palsy athlete, has won 7 medals (3 gold medals,3 silver medals and 1 bronze medal) at three Games – 1996 to 2004.
- Kieran Modra, a vision impaired athlete, has won 8 cycling medals (5 gold and 3 bronze medals). He has competed at eight Games, the last six as a cyclist.
- Lindy Hou, a vision impaired athlete, has won 6 medals (1 gold medal, 3 silver medals and 2 bronze medals) at two Games – 2004 to 2008
- Carol Cooke, an athlete with multiple sclerosis, has won 4 medals (3 gold and 1 silver) at three Games - 2012 to 2020

== Medal table ==
Games	Gold	Silver	Bronze	Total
1984 New York	0	0	0	0
1988 Seoul	0	0	0	0
1992 Barcelona	0	0	0	0
1996 Atlanta	5	5	0	10
2000 Sydney*	10	3	8	21
2004 Athens	10	7	7	24
2008 Beijing	3	5	7	15
2012 London	6	4	4	14
2016 Rio	3	7	3	13
2020 Tokyo	4	4	5	13
2024 Paris	4	4	3	11
Totals (11 entries)	45	39	37	121

== Summer Paralympic Games ==
Australian cycling team members at the Summer Paralympics

=== 1984 Los Angeles ===
Australia not represented.

=== 1988 Seoul ===
Australia represented by:
Men – Gregory Caines
Australia did not win any medals.

=== 1992 Barcelona ===
Australia represented by:
Men – Ronald Anderson, Paul Clohessy, Craig Elliott, Timothy Harris, Paul Lamond (Pilot), Stephen John Smith, Peter Stotzer
Women – Prue-Anne Reynalds
Officials – Manager - Ken Norris, Craig Jarvis, Joanne Sayers, Rod Stubbs (escorts) Australia did not win any medals.

=== 1996 Atlanta ===
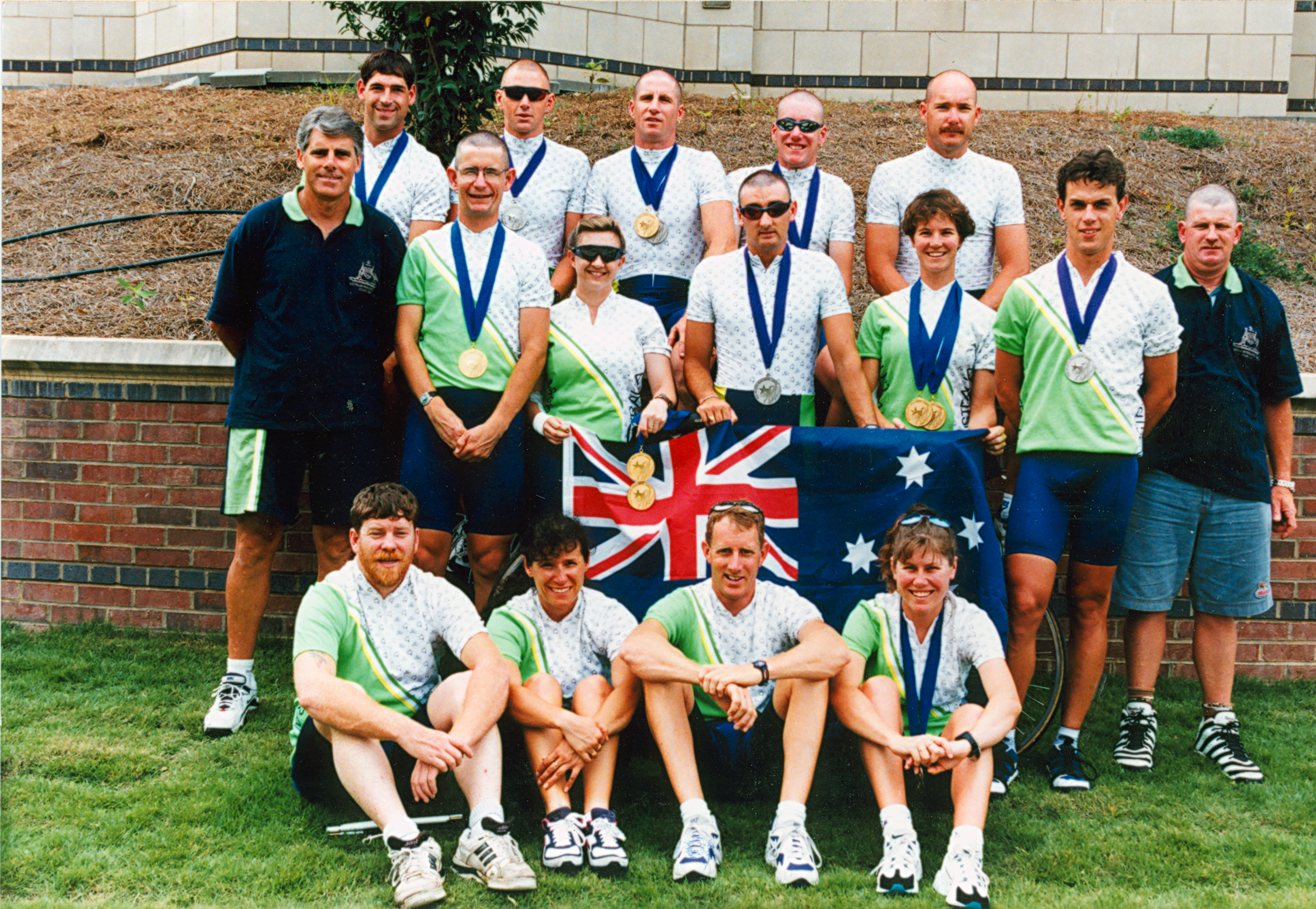
Australian cycling team at the 1996 Atlanta Paralympic Games

Australia represented by:
Men – Paul Clohessy, Kerry Golding (Pilot), Matthew Gray, Steven Gray (Pilot), Eddie Hollands (Pilot), Peter Homann, Paul Lake, Paul Lamond (Pilot), Gregory Madson, Kieran Modra, Christopher Scott
Women – Lyn Lepore, Teresa Poole, Sandra Smith (Pilot)
Coaches – Kenneth Norris (Head), David Woodhouse
Australia won 5 gold and 5 silver medals and was the number 1 ranked nation.

=== 2000 Sydney ===
Australia represented in cycling by:

Men – Greg Ball, Paul Clohessy, Matthew Gray, Steven Gray (Pilot), Darren Harry (Pilot), Eddie Hollands (Pilot), Peter Homann, Paul Lake, Mark le Flohic, Kieran Modra, David Murray, Paul O'Neill (Pilot), Daniel Polson, Christopher Scott, Noel Sens, Russell Wolfe (Pilot)
Women – Christine Fisher, Lyn Lepore, Kerry Modra (Pilot), Tania Modra (Pilot), Lynette Nixon (Pilot), Sarnya Parker
Coaches – Kevin McIntosh (Head), Darryl Benson, Radek Valenta
Officials – Manager - Elsa Lepore, John Beer, Rebecca Tweedy

Australia won 10 gold, 3 silver and 8 bronze medals and was ranked the number 1 nation.

=== 2004 Athens ===
Australia represented in cycling:
Men – Greg Ball, Anthony Biddle, Robert Crowe (Pilot), Peter Brooks, Peter Homann, Mark le Flohic, Kieran Modra, Andrew Panazzolo, Christopher Scott, David Short (Pilot), Kial Stewart (Pilot)
Women – Lindy Hou, Lyn Lepore, Janelle Lindsay (Pilot), Kelly McCombie (Pilot), Claire McLean, Jenny MacPherson (Pilot), Toireasa Ryan (Pilot), Janet Shaw
Coaches – Kevin McIntosh (Head), Darryl Benson, Andrew Budge Officials – Elsa Lepore (Manager), John Beer, Paul Lamond

Australia won 10 gold, 7 silver and 7 bronze medals and was the number 1 ranked nation. Leading cyclists were Christopher Scott (3 gold), Greg Ball (2 gold) and Kieran Modra (2 gold).

Detailed Australian Results - Track and Road

=== 2008 Beijing ===
Representing Australia in cycling:
Men – Greg Ball, Ben Demery, Michael Gallagher, Steven George (Pilot), Shaun Hopkins (Pilot), Tyson Lawrence (Pilot), Bryce Lindores, Michael Milton, Kieran Modra, Christopher Scott
Women – Jane Armstrong, Toireasa Gallagher (Pilot), Lindy Hou, Felicity Johnson, Mel Leckie, Jayme Paris, Katie Parker (Pilot)
Coaches – James Victor (Head Coach), Tom Skulander, Paul Martens
Officials – Mark Fulcher (Section Manager), Brett Hidson, Anouska Edwards, Alan Downes, Mark Bullen, Stuart Smith, Murray Lydeamore.

Included on the Australian team was Michael Milton, a four-time gold medalist as a skier in the Winter Paralympics. Mark le Flohic, gold medalist at the 2000 and 2004 Summer Paralympics, was to take part in the Beijing Games but had to pull out due to injury. Le Flohic broke his collar bone during training one week before the Games were to begin.

Australia won 3 gold, 5 silver and 7 bronze medals.

Detailed Australian Results - Track and Road

=== 2012 London ===
Representing Australia in cycling:
Men – Nigel Barley, Michael Gallagher, Bryce Lindores, Kieran Modra, David Nicholas, Stuart Tripp, Sean Finning (pilot for- Bryce Lindores), Scott McPhee (pilot for- Kieran Modra)
Women –Jessica Gallagher, Carol Cooke, Simone Kennedy, Alexandra Lisney, Sue Powell, Amanda Reid, Madison Janssen (d) (pilot for Jessica Gallagher)
Coaches – Peter Day (Head), Jenni Banks, Paul Martens, Tom Skulander
Officials – Section Manager – Murray Lydeamore, Mechanics – Peter Giessauf, Mike Winter, Physiotherapist – Anouska Edwards, Soft tissue therapist – Alan Downes

Australia won six gold, four silver and four bronze medals. Fourteen out of fifteen cyclists won medals. Pilot Mark Jamieson was replaced in the selected team by Sean Finning.

Detailed Australian Results - Track and Road

=== 2016 Rio ===
Representing Australia in cycling:
Men – Kieran Modra, David Nicholas, Stuart Tripp, Kyle Bridgwood, Alistair Donohoe, Matt Formston, David Edwards (for pilot Kieran Modra), Nick Yallouris (for pilot Matt Formston)
Women – Jessica Gallagher, Carol Cooke, Simone Kennedy, Alexandra Lisney, Sue Powell, Amanda Reid, Madison Janssen (pilot for Jessica Gallagher)
Coaches - Peter Day (Head), Thomas Skulander, Nick Formosa, Jason Niblett
Officials - Team Leader - Murray Lydeamore, Assistant Team Leader - Berthy May, Physiotherapist - Eliza Kwan, Mechanics - Michael Winter, Will Dickeson

Australia won 13 medals including three gold. Carol Cooke won two gold and David Nicholas one gold. Michael Gallagher was originally selected but on 2 September 2016 he was withdrawn from the team due to a positive doping test sample.

Detailed Australian Results - Track and Road

=== 2020 Tokyo ===
Representing Australia in cycling:
Men – Gordon Allan, Grant Allen, Alistair Donohoe, Stuart Jones, Darren Hicks, David Nicholas, Stuart Tripp Women – Carol Cooke, Paige Greco, Meg Lemon, Emily Petricola, Amanda Reid
Coaches - David Betts, Nick Formosa, Cameron Jennings
Officials - Team Leader - Warren McDonald, Physiotherapist - Keren Faulkner, Performance Support - Jamie Stanley, Mechanics - Michael Winter (track), Martin Millwood (road)
Australia won four gold, four silver and five bronze medals. Australia's four gold medals on all the track and were won by three debutants - Paige Greco, Emily Petricola, Darren Hicks and Rio Paralympian Amanda Reid.

Detailed Australian Results - Track and Road

=== 2024 Paris ===
Representing Australia in cycling:
Men – Gordon Allan (d), Grant Allen, Korey Boddington, Alistair Donohoe, Darren Hicks, Kane Perris Pilot:Luke Zaccaria
Women – Alana Forster, Jessica Gallagher (Pilot:Caitlin Ward, Meg Lemon, Lauren Parker, Emily Petricola, Amanda Reid
Coaches - David Betts, Cameron Jennings, Shane Kelly
Officials - Team Manager - Warren McDonald, Assistant Team Manager - Shane Perkins, Team Doctor - Alice McNamara, Physiotherapist - Eliza Smyth, Recovery Physiologist - Jamie Stanley, Mechanics - Peter Arch, Steve Nash, Carer - Berthy May
Australia won four gold, four silver and three bronze medals. Australia's four gold medals were won by Korey Boddington, Emily Petricola, Amanda Reid and Lauren Parker.

Detailed Australian Results - Track and Road

== See also ==
- Cycling at the Summer Paralympics
- List of Australian Paralympic cycling medalists
- Australia at the Paralympics
