= Cycling at the 2000 Summer Paralympics =

Cycling at the XI Paralympic Games
- Paralympic Cycling
- Venue: Centennial Parklands (road cycling); Dunc Gray Velodrome (track cycling)
- Competitors: 202 from 25 nations

Paralympic symbol (1994-2004)

Cycling at the 2000 Summer Paralympics consisted of 27 events in two disciplines, road cycling and track cycling.

== Medal table ==
Rank	Nation	Gold	Silver	Bronze	Total
1	Australia (AUS)	10	3	8	21
2	United States (USA)	3	4	2	9
3	Czech Republic (CZE)	3	1	2	6
4	Belarus (BLR)	2	0	0	2
5	Germany (GER)	1	4	0	5
6	Spain (ESP)	1	2	3	6
7	France (FRA)	1	2	2	5
8	Italy (ITA)	1	1	3	5
9	Japan (JPN)	1	1	0	2
9	Netherlands (NED)	1	1	0	2
11	Slovakia (SVK)	1	0	1	2
11	South Korea (KOR)	1	0	1	2
11	Switzerland (SUI)	1	0	1	2
14	Canada (CAN)	0	2	1	3
15	Austria (AUT)	0	2	0	2
15	Great Britain (GBR)	0	2	0	2
17	Norway (NOR)	0	1	2	3
18	New Zealand (NZL)	0	1	0	1
19	South Africa (RSA)	0	0	1	1
Totals (19 entries)		27	27	27	81

=== Participating nations ===
- Australia (22)
- Austria (9)
- Barbados (1)
- Belarus (4)
- Belgium (2)
- Brazil (2)
- Canada (10)
- Czech Republic (6)
- France (18)
- Germany (13)
- Great Britain (8)
- Italy (9)
- Japan (7)
- Netherlands (3)
- New Zealand (2)
- Norway (6)
- Portugal (1)
- Singapore (2)
- Slovakia (4)
- South Africa (2)
- South Korea (4)
- Spain (23)
- Switzerland (8)
- United States (35)
- Venezuela (1)

== Events ==
=== Road cycling ===
Event	Gold	Silver	Bronze
Mixed bicycle road race CP div 3	Daniel Nicholson; United States	Thomas Evans; Great Britain	Yong Sik Jin; South Korea
Mixed bicycle road race CP div 4	Peter Homann; Australia	Klaus Lungershausen; Germany	Christopher Scott; Australia
Mixed bicycle road race LC1	Thomas Neal; United States	Paul O'Neill; Australia	David Mercier; France
Mixed bicycle road race LC2	Daniel Polson; Australia	Jiří Ježek; Czech Republic	Sébastien Bichon; France
Mixed bicycle road race LC3	Bernard Champenois; France	Laurent Thirionet; France	José Andres Blanco Sánchez; Spain
Mixed bicycle time trial CP div 3	Yong Sik Jin; South Korea	Jean Quevillon; Canada	Marius Louw; South Africa
Mixed bicycle time trial CP div 4	Christopher Scott; Australia	Klaus Lungershausen; Germany	Peter Homann; Australia
Men's tandem open	Spain (ESP); Manuel Diaz; Oscar de la Cruz	Netherlands (NED); Jan Mulder; Pascal Schoots	Spain (ESP); Francisco Suarez; Jose Curieses
Women's tandem open	Australia (AUS); Lyn Lepore; Lynette Nixon	Germany (GER); Michaela Fuchs; Eva Fuenfgeld	Norway (NOR); Cathrine Noettingnes; Marianne Bruun
Mixed tandem open	Belarus (BLR); Iryna Fiadotava; Aliaksandr Danilik	Canada (CAN); Julie Cournoyer; Alexandre Cloutier	Italy (ITA); Silvana Valente; Fabrizio Di Somma
Mixed tricycle 1.9 km time trial CP div 2	Roman Musil; Czech Republic	Stuart Flacks; United States	Mark le Flohic; Australia
Mixed tricycle 5.4 km time trial CP div 2	Mark le Flohic; Australia	Stuart Flacks; United States	Roman Musil; Czech Republic

=== Track cycling ===
Event	Gold	Silver	Bronze
Mixed 1 km time trial LC1	Matthew Gray; Australia	Wolfgang Eibeck; Austria	Paul O'Neill; Australia
Mixed 1 km time trial LC2	Jiří Ježek; Czech Republic	Dory Selinger; United States	Paul Lake; Australia
Mixed 1 km time trial LC3	Radovan Kaufman; Slovakia	Mark Inglis; New Zealand	Beat Schwarzenbach; Switzerland
Men's 1 km time trial tandem open	Japan (JPN); Shigeo Yoshihara; Koichi Mizusawa	Great Britain (GBR); Robert Allen; Andrew Slater	Australia (AUS); Eddie Hollands; Paul Clohessy
Women's 1 km time trial tandem open	Australia (AUS); Sarnya Parker; Tania Modra	Australia (AUS); Lyn Lepore; Lynette Nixon	Norway (NOR); Cathrine Noettingnes; Marianne Bruun
Mixed 1 km time trial tandem open	United States (USA); Pamela Fernandes; Alphonso Whaley	Germany (GER); Michaela Fuchs; Jan Ratzke	Italy (ITA); Silvana Valente; Fabrizio Di Somma
Mixed individual pursuit LC1	Pierangelo Vignati; Italy	Wolfgang Eibeck; Austria	Paul O'Neill; Australia
Mixed individual pursuit LC2	Jiří Ježek; Czech Republic	Paul Lake; Australia	Dory Selinger; United States
Mixed individual pursuit LC3	Beat Schwarzenbach; Switzerland	José Andres Blanco Sánchez; Spain	Michal Stark; Czech Republic
Men's individual pursuit tandem open	Netherlands (NED); Jan Mulder; Jeron Straathof	Spain (ESP); Abelardo Gandia; Jose Munoz	Spain (ESP); Christian Venge; Jordi Domingo
Women's individual pursuit tandem open	Australia (AUS); Sarnya Parker; Tania Modra	Norway (NOR); Cathrine Noettingnes; Marianne Bruun	Australia (AUS); Lyn Lepore; Lynette Nixon
Mixed individual pursuit tandem open	Belarus (BLR); Iryna Fiadotava; Aliaksandr Danilik	Italy (ITA); Silvana Valente; Fabrizio Di Somma	Canada (CAN); Julie Cournoyer; Alexandre Cloutier
Men's sprint tandem open	Australia (AUS); Paul Clohessy; Darren Harry	Japan (JPN); Shigeo Yoshihara; Koichi Mizusawa	Slovakia (SVK); Jan Szojka; Juraj Petrovic
Mixed sprint tandem open	Germany (GER); Michaela Fuchs; Jan Ratzke	United States (USA); Pamela Fernandes; Alphonso Whaley	Italy (ITA); Claudio Costa; Serenella Bortolotto
Mixed team Olympic sprint LC1-3	Australia (AUS); Matthew Gray; Paul Lake; Greg Ball	France (FRA); Bernard Champenois; Patrick Ceria; Francis Trujillo	United States (USA); Robert Whitford; Dory Selinger; Bradley Cobb

== See also ==
- Cycling at the 2000 Summer Olympics
