= Archery at the 2000 Summer Paralympics – Men's team =

Men's team open at the XI Paralympic Games
- Venue: Sydney, Australia
- Dates: 20 to 25 October 2000
- Competitors: 42 from 14 nations

Medalists
1st place, gold medalist(s)		Italy
2nd place, silver medalist(s)		France
3rd place, bronze medalist(s)		South Korea

The men's team open archery event at the 2000 Summer Paralympics was held from 20 to 25 October 2000.

== Ranking round ==
Rank	Team	Points
1	South Korea	1869
2	France	1807
3	Great Britain	1787
4	Italy	1786
5	Slovakia	1736
6	Poland	1730
7	United States	1720
8	Germany	1717
9	Australia	1715
10	Spain	1698
11	Japan	1695
12	Iran	1688
13	Hong Kong	1623
14	Finland	1330

== Competition bracket ==
Round of 16
Australia	197
Germany	101
Iran	209
Slovakia	195
Hong Kong	186
Italy	217
Finland	210
Great Britain	218
Japan	225
Poland	211
United States	210
Spain	200

Quarterfinals
Australia	195
South Korea	208
Iran	207
Italy	221
Great Britain	200
Japan	204
United States	198
France	207

Semifinals
South Korea	200
Italy	213
Japan	194
France	211

Final
Italy	218
France	210
Third place
Japan	194
South Korea	200
