= Italy at the 2000 Summer Paralympics =

- IPC code: ITA
- NPC: Comitato Italiano Paralimpico
- Website: www.comitatoparalimpico.it (in Italian)

in Sydney
- Competitors: 63 (48 male, 15 female)
- Medals Ranked 18th: Gold 9 Silver 8 Bronze 10 Total 27

Summer Paralympics appearances (overview)
- 1960; 1964; 1968; 1972; 1976; 1980; 1984; 1988; 1992; 1996; 2000; 2004; 2008; 2012; 2016; 2020; 2024

There were 15 female and 48 male athletes representing the country at the 2000 Summer Paralympics.

== Medalists ==
Medal	Athlete	Sport	Event
Gold	Salvatore Carrubba; Oscar De Pellegrin; Giuseppe Gabelli	Archery	Men's teams open
Gold	Paola Fantato	Archery	Women's individual W1/W2
Gold	Paola Fantato; Sandra Truccolo; Anna Menconi	Archery	Women's teams open
Gold	Lorenzo Ricci	Athletics	Men's 100m T11
Gold	Alvise De Vidi	Athletics	Men's 800m T51
Gold	Alvise De Vidi	Athletics	Men's 1500m T51
Gold	Alvise De Vidi	Athletics	Men's marathon T51
Gold	Matteo Tassetti; Aldo Manganaro; Mauro Porpora; Lorenzo Ricci	Athletics	Men's 4 × 100 m relay T13
Gold	Pierangelo Vignati	Cycling	Mixed individual pursuit LC1
Silver	Alvise De Vidi	Athletics	Men's 400m T51
Silver	Maurizio Nalin	Athletics	Men's shot put F57
Silver	Paolo D'Agostini	Athletics	Men's pentathlon P53
Silver	Maria Ligorio	Athletics	Women's 200m T11
Silver	Silvana Valente; Fabrizio Di Somma	Cycling	Mixed individual pursuit tandem open
Silver	Luca Mazzone	Swimming	Men's 50m freestyle S4
Silver	Luca Mazzone	Swimming	Men's 200m freestyle S4
Silver	Alberto Pellegrini	Wheelchair fencing	Men's foil individual A
Bronze	Oscar De Pellegrin	Archery	Men's individual W2
Bronze	Aldo Manganaro	Athletics	Men's 100m T13
Bronze	Alvise De Vidi	Athletics	Men's 200m T51
Bronze	Carlo Durante	Athletics	Men's marathon T11
Bronze	Francesca Porcellato	Athletics	Women's 100m T53
Bronze	Silvana Valente; Fabrizio Di Somma	Cycling	Mixed tandem open
Bronze	Silvana Valente; Fabrizio Di Somma	Cycling	Mixed 1 km time trial tandem open
Bronze	Claudio Costa; Serenella Bortolotto	Cycling	Mixed sprint tandem open
Bronze	Alberto Pellegrini	Wheelchair fencing	Men's épée individual A
Bronze	Alberto Pellegrini; Gerardo Mari; Alberto Serafini; Soriano Ceccanti	Wheelchair fencing	Men's foil team

== See also ==
- Italy at the 2000 Summer Olympics
- Italy at the Paralympics

== Bibliography ==
- International Paralympic Committee (2000). "Appendix C: Athlete Numbers - By Delegation". Sydney 2000 Paralympic Games Post Games Report. Sydney.
