= Kevin McIntosh =

Australian cycling coach

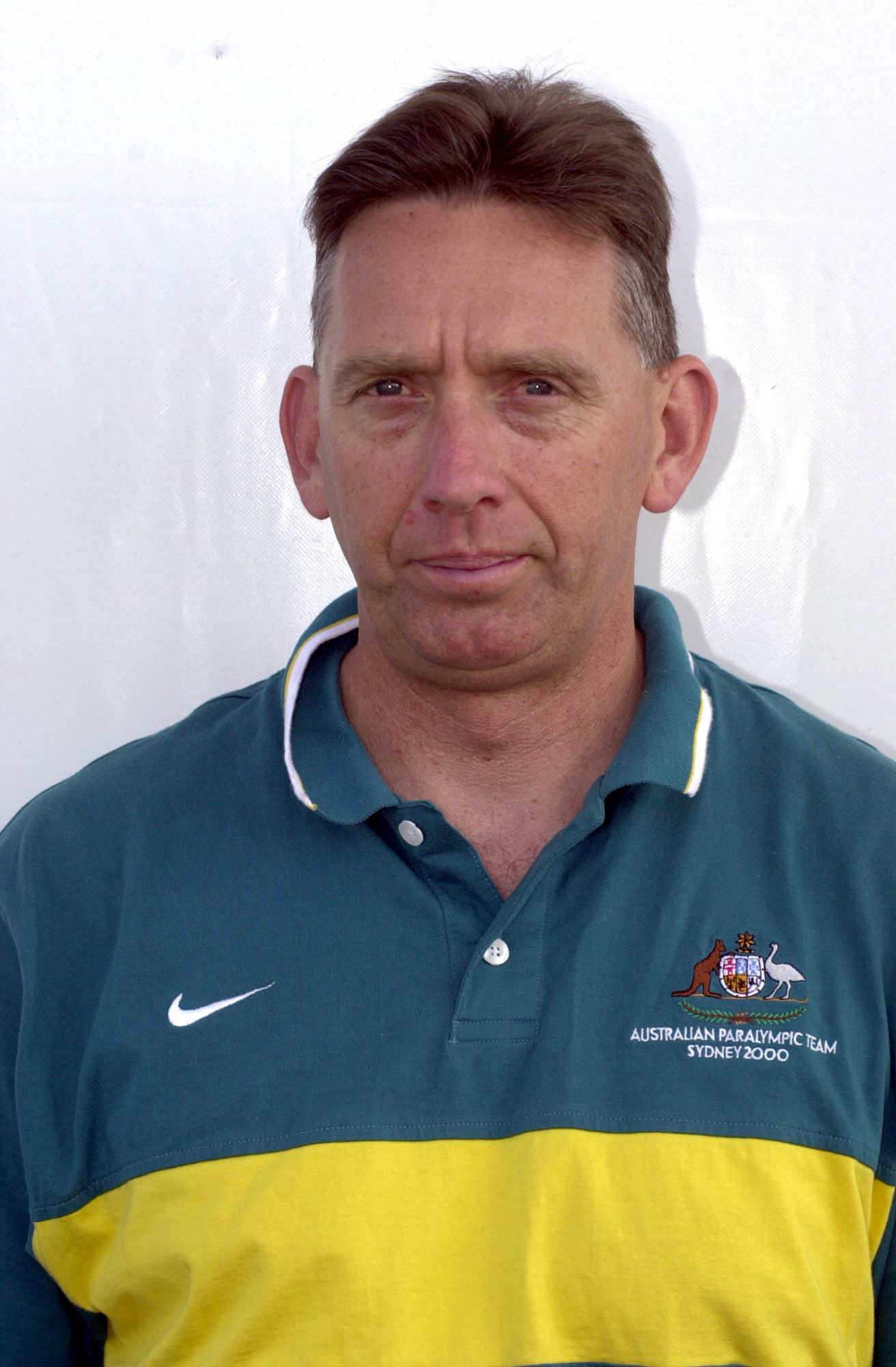
- Portrait of McIntosh at the 2000 Summer Paralympics

Personal information
- Nationality: Australia
- Born: Horsham, Victoria, Australia

Kevin McIntosh is an Australian cycling coach.

== Personal ==
McIntosh is from South Australia. He lives in Adelaide, South Australia.

== Cycling ==
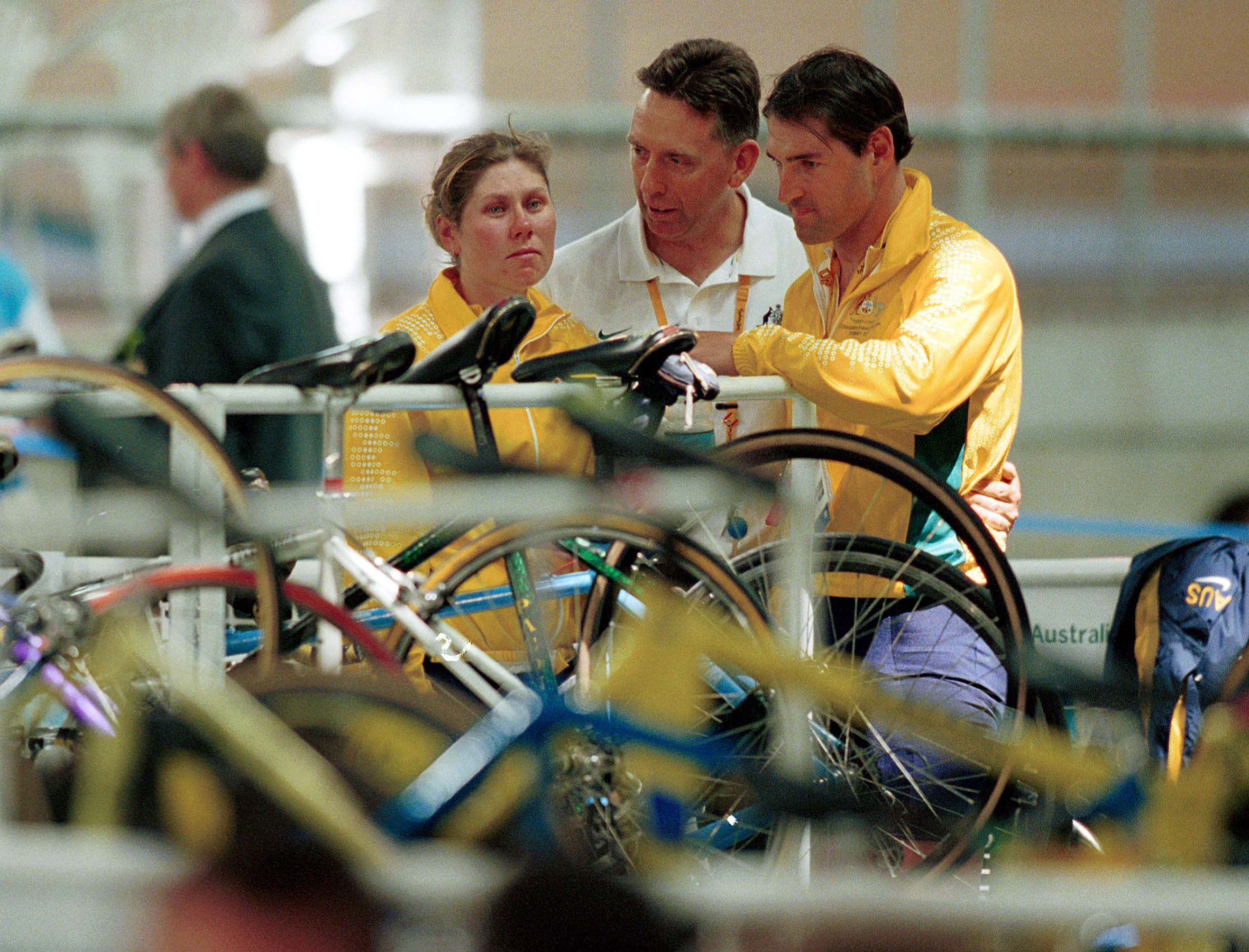
McIntosh (centre) consoles disappointed Australian track cyclists Kerry and Kieran Modra at the 2000 Summer Paralympics

McIntosh is an Australian cycling coach.

As Victorian Junior Coach, McIntosh coached, Brett Lancaster, Brad Davidson, David Pell, Craig Ditchburn, Noel Sens.

As Western Australian Institute of Sport Head Coach, Ryan Bayley, Peter Dawson, Rik Steele, Brody Cullen, Eddy Hollands,

As Paralympic Head Coach, Cyclists he has coached include Andrew Panazzolo, Scott McPhee, Angela Fleming, Paralympic medalist Mark le Flohic, Paralympic medalist Michael Gallagher, and Paralympic medalist Kieran Modra.

McIntosh has coached cycling competitors who have won a combined total of ten gold medals at the Summer Paralympic Games. He coached cyclists at the 2000 Summer Paralympics, 2004 Summer Paralympics and 2008 Summer Paralympics. In early 2005, he was reappointed the head coach of the Australian Paralympic Cycling program.

McIntosh has been the coach for the Bendigo and District Cycling Club. In 1999, he became the National Para-cycling Head Coach for Cycling Australia. He left the position in 2007 to take a cycling coaching position with the South Australian Sports Institute, and was replaced at Cycling Australia by James Victor. In 2011, he became the Coaching Director for Cycling South Australia. He coached the Australian team at the 2005 European Cycling Championships. He also coached the Australian team at the 2006 International Paralympic Committee World Cycling Championships. In 2007, he was an assistant coach for the Australian team at the 2007 UCI Para-Cycling World Championships. In 2007, he was one of the national selectors for Cycling Australia's para-cycling program alongside Mark Fulcher and James Victor.

In the ten (10) year period as Head Paralympic Cycling Coach, McIntosh overseen more than 100 Gold Medals at Paralympic Games, World Championships, and European Championships, Along with another 100 Silver and Bronze Medals.

== Recognition ==
In 2000, 2002 and 2004, McIntosh was named the Australian Paralympic Committee Coach of the Year. In 2000, he was named Cycling Australia's coach of the year. He was inducted into the International Paralympic Committee Hall of Fame in 2008.
