= Francisco Javier Suárez Regueiro =

Spanish cyclist

Francisco Suárez
Personal information
- Full name: Francisco Javier Suárez Regueiro
- Nationality: Spanish
- Born: 10 September 1977 (age 48) Asturias, Spain
Medal record
Men's cycling
Representing Spain
Paralympic Games
Bronze medal – third place	2000 Sydney	Road Tandem Open

Francisco Javier Suárez Regueiro (born 10 September 1977 in Asturias) is a cyclist from Spain who is visually impaired. He competed at the 2000 Summer Paralympics in cycling. He was the third cyclist to finish in the Tandem Road race.
