= Pamela Fernandes =

American Paralympic cyclist

Personal information
- Born: June 24, 1961 (age 65) Needham, Massachusetts, USA

Sport
- Country: United States
- Sport: Para cycling
Medal record
Para cycling
Representing United States
Paralympic Games
Gold medal – first place	2000 Sydney	Mixed time trial tandem open
Silver medal – second place	2000 Sydney	Mixed sprint tandem open
Bronze medal – third place	1996 Atlanta	Mixed time trial tandem open
World Track Championships
Gold medal – first place	2002 Augsburg	Mixed time trial tandem open

Pamela "Pam" Fernandes (born June 24, 1961) is an American former Paralympic cyclist who competed at the 1996 and 2000 Summer Paralympics. She was the first Paralympian to win the US Olympic Spirit Award in 2001.

Fernandes was diagnosed with diabetes when she was four years old and became legally blind at 21 years old.
