= Cathrine Nøttingnes =

Norwegian cross-country skier

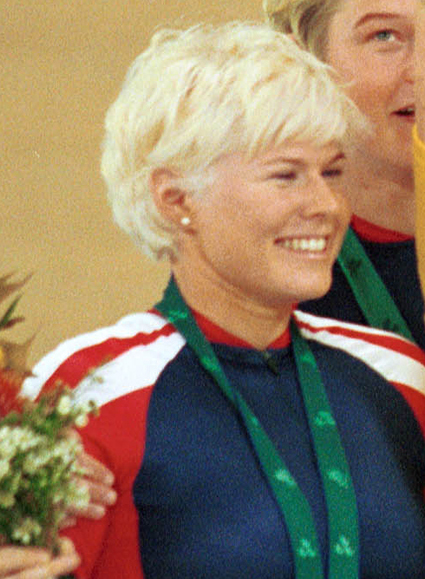
- Nøttingnes at 2000 Summer Paralympics

Personal information
- Born: 5 September 1974 (age 51) Bergen, Norway

Sport
- Country: Norway
- Sport: Paralympic cycling Cross-country skiing
Medal record
Paralympic cycling
Representing Norway
Paralympic Games
Silver medal – second place	2000 Sydney	Individual pursuit tandem open
Bronze medal – third place	2000 Sydney	Road tandem open
Bronze medal – third place	2000 Sydney	1km time trial tandem open

Cathrine Nøttingnes (born 5 September 1974) is a Norwegian paralympic athlete. She participated in the 2000 Paralympic Summer Games in Sydney, where she won a total of three medals in cycling. She also participated in the 1994 Paralympic Winter Games in Lillehammer, and 1998 Paralympic Winter Games, in Nagano, in cross-country skiing.

She is visually impaired, competes in class B2 and cycled with Marianne Bruun.

== Career ==
She competed at the 2000 Paralympic Summer Games, winning a silver medal in cycling, tandem, 3,000 meter pursuit, Bronze medal in cycling, tandem, 1 kilometer time trial, and bronze medal in cycling, tandem, road race.

At the 1998 Paralympic Winter Games, in Nagano, she placed ninth in 5 km Classical Technique B2-3.
