= Abelardo Gandía =

Spanish cyclist (born 1977)

Personal information
- Full name: Abelardo Gandía Valdés
- Nationality: Spanish
- Born: 5 September 1977 (age 48) Requena, Valencia, Spain

Sport
- Country: Spain
- Sport: Cycling
Medal record
Men's track cycling
Representing Spain
Paralympic Games
Silver medal – second place	2000 Sydney	Individual pursuit tandem open

Abelardo Gandía Valdés (born 5 September 1977 in Requena) is a cyclist from Spain. He has a vision impairment. He competed at the 1996 Summer Paralympics, where he did not medal. He competed at the 2000 Summer Paralympics. He finished second in the Tandem Individual Pursuit track race.
