= Dory Selinger =

American cyclist (1971–2026)

Personal information
- Born: October 13, 1971 San Francisco, California, U.S.
- Died: April 16, 2026 (aged 54) McKinney, Texas, U.S.
- Home town: Oakland, California, U.S.
- Education: University of California

Sport
- Country: United States
- Sport: Para cycling
Medal record
Para cycling
Representing United States
Paralympic Games
Gold medal – first place	1996 Atlanta	Mixed track omnium LC2
Silver medal – second place	2000 Sydney	Mixed 1km time trial LC2
Bronze medal – third place	2000 Sydney	Mixed road race LC2
Bronze medal – third place	2000 Sydney	Mixed team sprint LC1-3
World Championships
Gold medal – first place	1998 Colorado Springs	1km pursuit LC2
Gold medal – first place	1998 Colorado Springs	4km pursuit LC2
Gold medal – first place	2002 Augsburg	1km pursuit LC2
Silver medal – second place	1998 Colorado Springs	Team sprint LC1-3
Silver medal – second place	2002 Augsburg	4km pursuit LC2

Dory Selinger (October 13, 1971 – April 16, 2026) was an American Paralympic cyclist and world record holder who competed in international cycling competitions. He was a Paralympic gold medalist and three-time World champion in track cycling and competed at the 1996 and 2000 Summer Paralympics.

== 1993 vehicular attack ==
In January 1993, Selinger and seven other cyclists were deliberately rammed by a driver who was experiencing a psychotic episode. Selinger's right leg was caught in the wheel well of the car that had hit him. He spent seven days in a coma and had his right leg below the knee amputated. He also had a head injury which affected his speech and memory. His friend Vladimir Quinn was killed in the attack.

== Death ==
Selinger was struck by a vehicle and killed while on his regular ride near his home in McKinney, Texas, on April 16, 2026. He was 54.
