= José Andres Blanco =

Spanish cyclist (born 1958)

Personal information
- Full name: José Andres Blanco Sánchez
- Nationality: Spanish
- Born: 13 April 1958 (age 68) Madrid, Spain

Sport
- Country: Spain
- Sport: Cycling
Medal record
Men's cycling
Representing Spain
Paralympic Games
Silver medal – second place	2000 Sydney	Mixed Pursuit track LC3
Bronze medal – third place	2000 Sydney	Mixed Bicycle Road Race LC3

José Andres Blanco Sánchez (born 13 April 1958 in Madrid) is a cyclist from Spain. He has a disability: He is a type LC3 cyclist. He competed at the 2000 Summer Paralympics. He finished second in the Individual Pursuit track LC3 race. He finished third in the Road LC3 race.
