= Manuel Díaz Montava =

Spanish cyclist

Personal information
- Nationality: Spanish

Sport
- Country: Spain
- Sport: Cycling
Medal record
Men's cycling
Representing Spain
Paralympic Games

Manuel Díaz Montava (born May 14, 1957, in Alicante) is a cyclist from Spain. He has a disability: He is blind. He competed at the 1996 Summer Paralympics, where he failed to medal. He competed at the 2000 Summer Paralympics. He finished first in the tandem road race.
