= United States at the 2000 Summer Paralympics =

- Flag of the United States
- IPC code: USA
- NPC: United States Paralympic Committee
- Website: www.teamusa.org/US-Paralympics

in Sydney
- Competitors: 267
- Flag bearer: Mike Dempsey (opening)
- Medals Ranked 5th: Gold 36 Silver 39 Bronze 34 Total 109

Summer Paralympics appearances (overview)
- 1960; 1964; 1968; 1972; 1976; 1980; 1984; 1988; 1992; 1996; 2000; 2004; 2008; 2012; 2016; 2020; 2024

The United States sent a delegation to compete at the 2000 Summer Paralympics in Sydney, Australia. The United States finished fifth in the gold medal count and third in the overall medal count.

== Medalists ==
The following American athletes won medals at the games.

Medal	Name	Sport	Event
Gold	Danny Andrews	Athletics	Men's 800 m T44
Gold	Cheri Becerra-Madsen	Athletics	Women's 100 m T54
Gold	Cheri Becerra-Madsen	Athletics	Women's 400 m T54
Gold	Shawn Brown	Athletics	Men's Discus F44
Gold	Shea Cowart	Athletics	Women's 100 m T44
Gold	Shea Cowart	Athletics	Women's 200 m T44
Gold	Ross Davis	Athletics	Men's 100 m T34
Gold	Bart Dodson	Athletics	Men's 200 m T51
Gold	Jean Driscoll	Athletics	Women's Marathon T54
Gold	Robert De Friese Evans	Athletics	Men's 1,500 m T46
Gold	Robert De Friese Evans	Athletics	Men's 5,000 m T46
Gold	Royal Mitchell	Athletics	Men's 400 m T13
Gold	Paul Nitz	Athletics	Men's 100 m T52
Gold	Marlon Shirley	Athletics	Men's 100 m T44
Gold	Thomas Neal	Cycling	Mixed Bicycle Road Race LC1
Gold	Daniel Nicholson	Cycling	Mixed Bicycle Road Race CP Div 3
Gold	Pamela Fernandes; Alphonso Whaley	Cycling	Mixed 1 km Time Trial Tandem open
Gold	Stephan Moore	Judo	Men's Up To 73 kg
Gold	Kevin Szott	Judo	Men's Over 100 kg
Gold	Pernell Cooper	Powerlifting	Men's Over 100 kg
Gold	Stephanie Brooks	Swimming	Women's 400 m Freestyle S6
Gold	Daniel Kelly	Swimming	Men's 100 m Backstroke S11
Gold	Daniel Kelly	Swimming	Men's 100 m Freestyle S11
Gold	Daniel Kelly	Swimming	Men's 200 m Medley SM11
Gold	Curtis Lovejoy	Swimming	Men's 100 m Freestyle S2
Gold	Curtis Lovejoy	Swimming	Men's 50 m Freestyle S2
Gold	Travis Mohr	Swimming	Men's 100 m Breaststroke SB6
Gold	Karen Norris	Swimming	Women's 100 m Backstroke S10
Gold	Erin Popovich	Swimming	Women's 100 m Breaststroke SB5
Gold	Erin Popovich	Swimming	Women's 100 m Freestyle S6
Gold	Erin Popovich	Swimming	Women's 50 m Butterfly S6
Gold	Lauren Reynolds	Swimming	Women's 400 m Freestyle S7
Gold	Elizabeth Scott	Swimming	Women's 100 m Freestyle S13
Gold	Elizabeth Scott	Swimming	Women's 50 m Freestyle S13
Gold	Jason Wening	Swimming	Men's 400 m Freestyle S8
Gold	United States national wheelchair rugby team: Clifton Chunn; Eddie Crouch; Rick Draney; Daniel Guillou; Bryan Kirkland; Norm Lyduch; Dean MacCabe; Troy McGuirk; Stephen Pate; William Renje; Wayne Romero; Ralph Shadowebs	Wheelchair rugby	Mixed competition
Silver	Robert Balk	Athletics	Men's Pentathlon P58
Silver	Lisa Banta	Athletics	Women's Discus F12
Silver	Jennifer Barrett	Athletics	Women's Discus F46
Silver	Cheri Becerra-Madsen	Athletics	Women's 200 m T54
Silver	Cheri Blauwet	Athletics	Women's 100 m T53
Silver	Thomas Bourgeois	Athletics	Men's Pentathlon P44
Silver	Jean Driscoll	Athletics	Women's 1,500 m T54
Silver	Brian Frasure	Athletics	Men's 100 m T44
Silver	Jessica Galli	Athletics	Women's 800 m T53
Silver	Roderick Green	Athletics	Men's 200 m T44
Silver	Douglas Heir	Athletics	Men's Shot Put F52
Silver	John Register	Athletics	Men's Long Jump F42
Silver	Marlon Shirley	Athletics	Men's High Jump F46
Silver	Chris Waddell	Athletics	Men's 200 m T53
Silver	Dana Zimmerman	Athletics	Men's 1,500 m T37
Silver	Stuart Flacks	Cycling	Mixed Tricycle 1.9 km Time Trial CP Div 2
Silver	Stuart Flacks	Cycling	Mixed Tricycle 5.4 km Time Trial CP Div 2
Silver	Pamela Fernandes; Alphonso Whaley	Cycling	Mixed Sprint Tandem open
Silver	Dory Selinger	Cycling	Mixed 1 km Time Trial LC2
Silver	Brett Lewis	Judo	Men's Up To 90 kg
Silver	Kim Brownfield	Powerlifting	Men's Over 100 kg
Silver	Melanie Benn; Stephanie Brooks; Aimee Bruder; Erin Popovich	Swimming	Women's 4x50 m Freestyle 20 pts
Silver	Kendra Berner; Shannon Bothelio; Karen Norris; Lauren Reynolds	Swimming	Women's 4 × 100 m Freestyle 34 pts
Silver	Kendra Berner	Swimming	Women's 100 m Freestyle S10
Silver	Kendra Berner	Swimming	Women's 400 m Freestyle S10
Silver	Kendra Berner	Swimming	Women's 50 m Freestyle S10
Silver	Shannon Bothelio	Swimming	Women's 50 m Freestyle S7
Silver	Sarah Castle	Swimming	Women's 100 m Breaststroke SB6
Silver	Daniel Kelly	Swimming	Men's 50 m Freestyle S11
Silver	Erin Popovich	Swimming	Women's 200 m Medley SM6
Silver	Erin Popovich	Swimming	Women's 50 m Freestyle S6
Silver	Lauren Reynolds	Swimming	Women's 100 m Freestyle S7
Silver	Elizabeth Scott	Swimming	Women's 200 m Medley SM13
Silver	James Thompson	Swimming	Men's 50 m Breaststroke SB2
Silver	Trischa Zorn	Swimming	Women's 100 m Backstroke S12
Silver	Trischa Zorn	Swimming	Women's 100 m Breaststroke SB12
Silver	Trischa Zorn	Swimming	Women's 100 m Butterfly S12
Silver	Trischa Zorn	Swimming	Women's 200 m Medley SM12
Silver	Stephen Welch	Wheelchair tennis	Men's Singles
Bronze	Jennifer Barrett	Athletics	Women's Shot Put F46
Bronze	Cheri Blauwet	Athletics	Women's 200 m T53
Bronze	Cheri Blauwet	Athletics	Women's 400 m T53
Bronze	Cheri Blauwet	Athletics	Women's 800 m T53
Bronze	Joseph Christmas	Athletics	Men's Discus F56
Bronze	Joseph Christmas	Athletics	Men's Javelin F56
Bronze	Ross Davis	Athletics	Men's 200 m T34
Bronze	Ross Davis	Athletics	Men's 400 m T34
Bronze	Gabriel Diaz de Leon	Athletics	Men's Discus F53
Bronze	Bart Dodson	Athletics	Men's 400 m T51
Bronze	Jean Driscoll	Athletics	Women's 5,000 m T54
Bronze	Roderick Green	Athletics	Men's 400 m T44
Bronze	Roderick Green	Athletics	Men's Long Jump F44
Bronze	Michael Keohane	Athletics	Men's Marathon T46
Bronze	Jeffrey Lauterbach	Athletics	Men's Discus F33
Bronze	Joseph LeMar	Athletics	Men's 800 m T44
Bronze	Pamela McGonigle	Athletics	Women's 1,500 m T12
Bronze	Asya Miller	Athletics	Women's Discus F13
Bronze	Laura Ann Terry	Athletics	Women's Shot Put F33-34
Bronze	Tim Willis	Athletics	Men's 10,000 m T11
Bronze	Bradley Cobb; Dory Selinger; Robert Whitford	Cycling	Mixed Team Olympic Sprint LC1-3
Bronze	Dory Selinger	Cycling	Mixed Individual Pursuit LC2
Bronze	Marlon Lopez	Judo	Men's Up To 66 kg
Bronze	Thomas Brown	Sailing	Mixed Single Person 2.4mr
Bronze	Shannon Bothelio	Swimming	Women's 100 m Backstroke S7
Bronze	Shannon Bothelio	Swimming	Women's 50 m Butterfly S7
Bronze	Jennifer Butcher	Swimming	Women's 100 m Freestyle S13
Bronze	Daniel Kelly	Swimming	Men's 100 m Breaststroke SB11
Bronze	Travis Mohr	Swimming	Men's 100 m Backstroke S8
Bronze	Elizabeth Scott	Swimming	Women's 100 m Breaststroke SB13
Bronze	Trischa Zorn	Swimming	Women's 50 m Freestyle S12
Bronze	Joshua Keith Bartel; Norman Bass	Table tennis	Men's Teams 6-7
Bronze	United States men's national wheelchair basketball team: Eric Barber; Curtis Bell; Chuck Gill; Jeffrey James Glasbrenner; William Hernandez; Lawrence Johnson; Melvin Sean Juette; David Paul Kiley; Mike Schlappi; Paul Schulte; Steve Tew; William Henry Waller	Wheelchair basketball	Men's competition
Bronze	Scott Douglas; Stephen Welch	Wheelchair tennis	Men's Doubles

== See also ==
- 2000 Summer Paralympics
- United States at the 2000 Summer Olympics
