= Sarnya Parker =

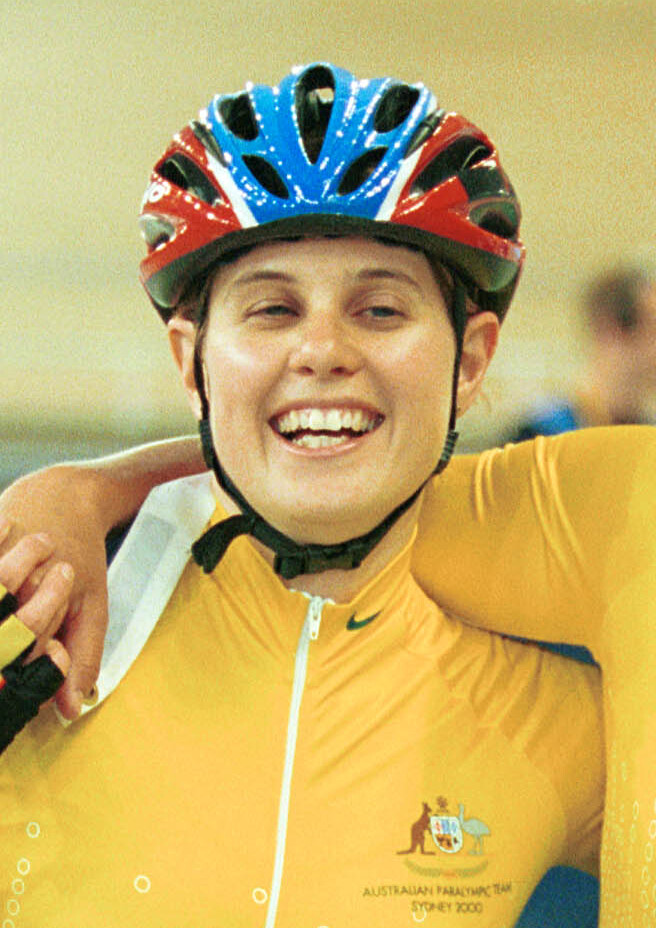

Personal information
- Full name: Sarnya Marie Parker
- Born: 6 June 1975 (age 51) Loxton, South Australia

Sport
- Sport: Para-cycling
- Disability: Visual impairment
Medal record
Women's cycling
Representing Australia
Paralympic Games
Gold medal – first place	2000 Sydney	1 km Time Trial Tandem open
Gold medal – first place	2000 Sydney	Individual Pursuit Tandem open
IPC Track and Road World Championships
Gold medal – first place	2002 Altenstadt	Women's 200 m Time Trial B & VI
Gold medal – first place	2002 Altenstadt	Women's 1000 m Time Trial B & VI
Gold medal – first place	2002 Altenstadt	Women's Road Race B & VI
Silver medal – second place	2002 Altenstadt	Women's Road Time Trial B & VI

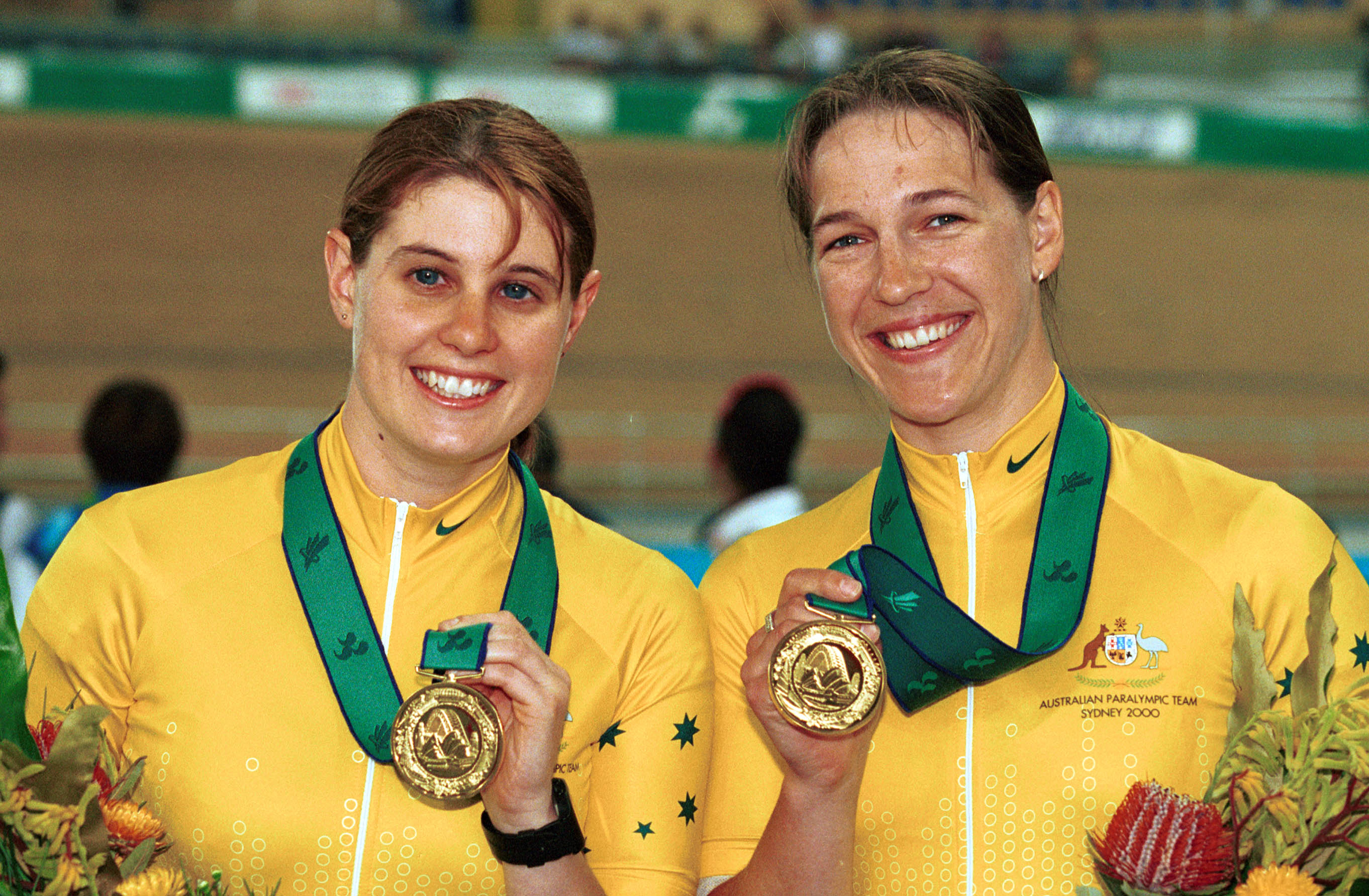
Parker (shown left) with her cycling partner Tania Modra, after winning gold in the 2000 Paralympics

Sarnya Marie Parker, OAM (born 6 June 1975) is an Australian visually impaired paralympic tandem cyclist and two-time gold medalist at the 2000 Paralympics.

== Early life and education ==
She was born in the South Australian town of Loxton.

Before she took up Paralympic tandem cycling, she was a nationally ranked top-ten pentathlete. She won a gold medal in long jump at the 1999 FESPIC Games in Thailand.

In 1999 she obtained a university degree and started work at Telstra.

== Career ==
=== Preparation and Games ===
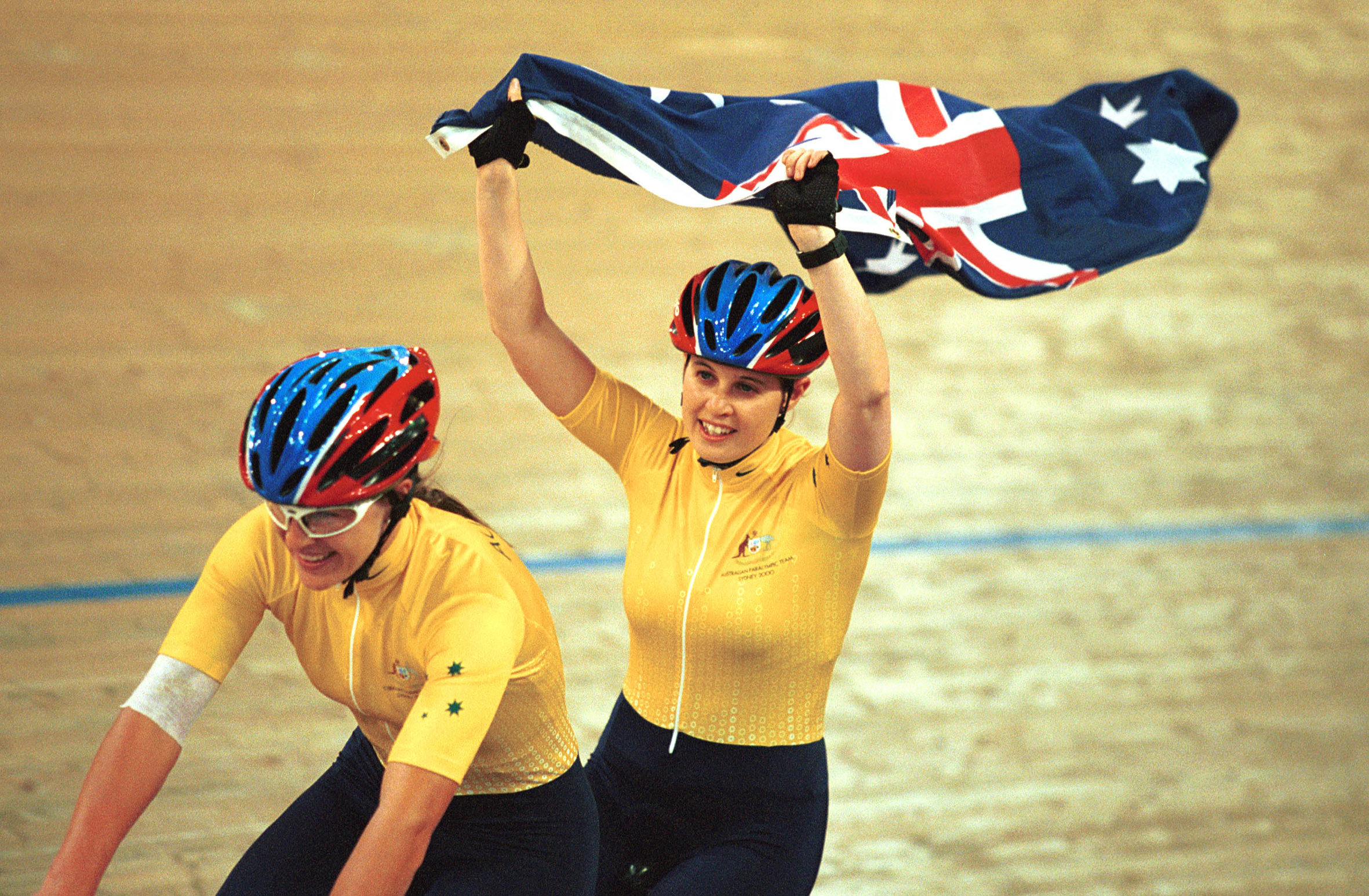
Celebration after winning gold in the individual pursuit event

Eighteen months before the 2000 Sydney Games, visually impaired Paralympic tandem cyclist Kieran Modra convinced her to switch from athletics to cycling because of the limited opportunities in the former sport for Paralympians. He introduced her to his sister Tania Modra, who would become her pilot.

Neither Tania nor Parker had experience in competitive cycling. During the period of 18 months, they trained for about 22 hours a week while also working professionally. Aside from training they also needed to compete to qualify for the Games. They won 5 gold medals at Southern Cross Games and 3 gold medals at Australian National Championship 2000.

She won two gold medals for Australia with Modra at the 2000 Sydney Games in the 1 km road race and 3 km pursuit, the pair broke the world record in both events.

=== Post-Games Career ===
In 2001, she also had a very successful performance at the European Championships in Switzerland, where she and Modra won all the events they participated in, including four track events and the road time trial.

In August 2002, the International Paralympic Committee World Cycling Championships were held in Altenstadt, southern Germany. This time, Parker competed in tandem with Toireasa Ryan. During the first three days of the competition, they won all their events, including qualifying rounds, gold in the 1 km time trial, and gold in the 200 m sprint. In the final of the 3 km pursuit race, they lost to the team from the United States (Karissa Whitsell and Katie Compton), winning a silver medal. After a few days of rest, on the final day of the competition, they won gold in the 52 km road race (10 laps), beating three teams from three other countries and one from Australia.

== Awards and honours ==
In 2000, shortly after the Olympics, Australia Post issued stamps featuring the gold medal-winning tandem team. Same year she also received an Australian Sports Medal. In January 2001, she was awarded the Medal of the Order of Australia (OAM).

In 2009, a walking trail on the riverfront of Loxton was named after her.
