= Pierangelo Vignati =

Italian Paralympic cyclist

Personal information
- Born: 10 December 1970 (age 55) Piacenza, Italy
- Spouse: Giovanna Castignoli

Sport
- Country: Italy
- Sport: Para cycling
- Disability class: LC1
Medal record
Event	1st	2nd	3rd
Paralympic Games	1	0	0

Pierangelo Vignati (born 10 December 1970) is a former Italian paralympic cyclist who won a gold medal at the 2000 Summer Paralympics.

== Biography ==
In 2021 he was technical commentator for cycling for RAI, alongside the commentator Stefano Rizzato, at the Tokyo 2020 Paralympics.
