= Matthew Gray (cyclist) =

Australian Paralympic cyclist

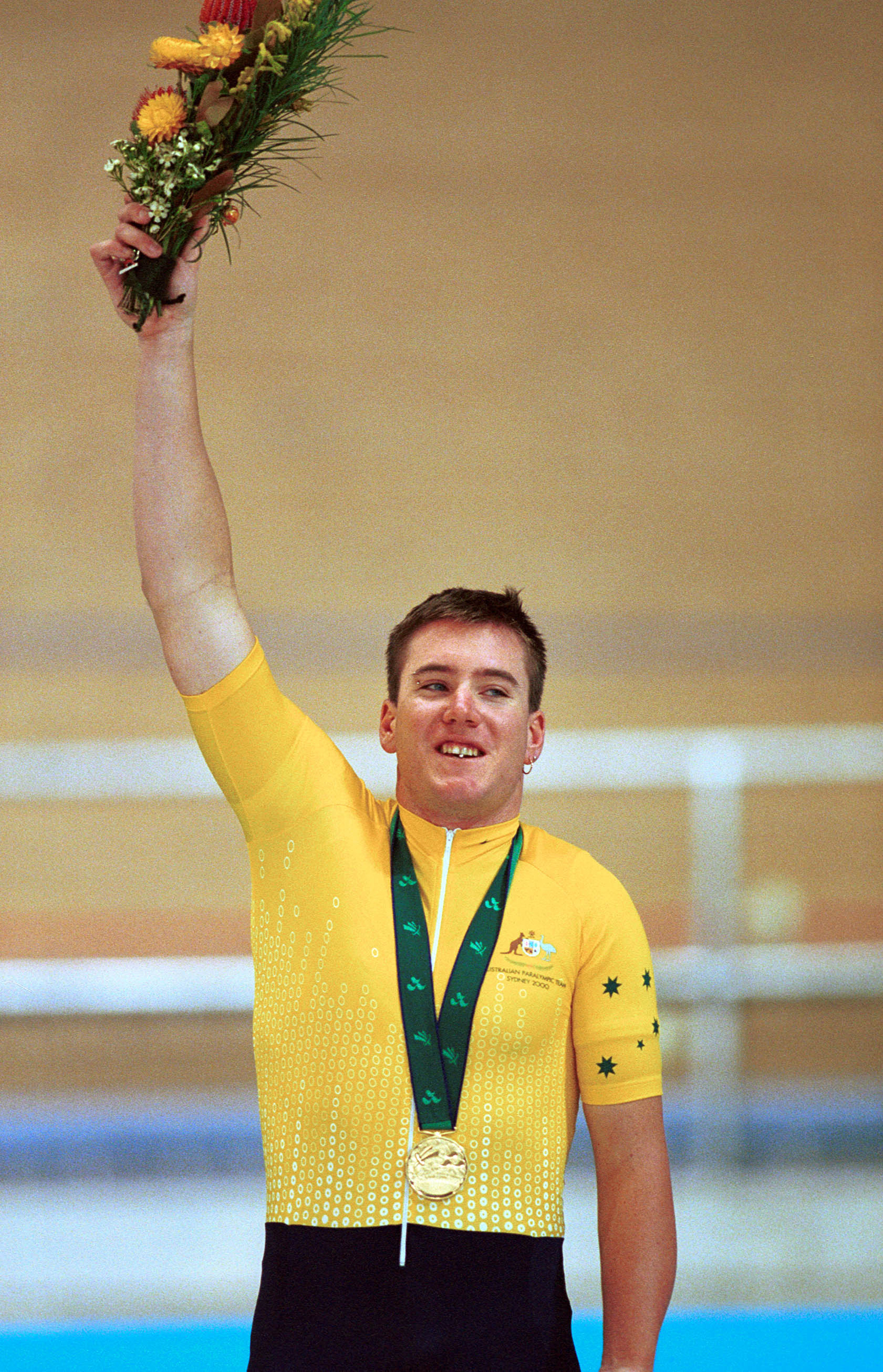
- Gray on the podium with his gold medal won at the 2000 Summer Paralympics LC1 1 km Time Trial

Personal information
- Full name: Matthew Douglas Gray
- Nationality: Australia
- Born: 20 December 1977 (age 48) Perth, Western Australia
Medal record
Men's cycling
Representing Australia
Paralympic Games
Gold medal – first place	2000 Sydney	Mixed 1 km Time Trial LC1
Gold medal – first place	2000 Sydney	Mixed Team Olympic Sprint LC1–3
Silver medal – second place	1996 Atlanta	Mixed Omnium LC1
IPC Track and Road World Championships
Gold medal – first place	1998 Colorado Springs	Mixed Team Sprint LC1-4/CP Div 3-4
Gold medal – first place	1998 Colorado Springs	Mixed Time Trial LC1
Gold medal – first place	2002 Altenstadt	Mixed Team Sprint LC1-4/CP Div 3-4
Gold medal – first place	2002 Altenstadt	Men's Time Trial LC1

Matthew Douglas Gray, OAM (born 20 December 1977) is an Australian Paralympic cyclist. He was born in Perth. At the 1996 Atlanta Games, he won a silver medal in the Mixed Omnium LC1 event. He won two gold medals at the 2000 Sydney Games in the Mixed 1 km Time Trial LC1 and Mixed Olympic Sprint LC1–3 events, for which he received a Medal of the Order of Australia. He broke a world record in the former event.

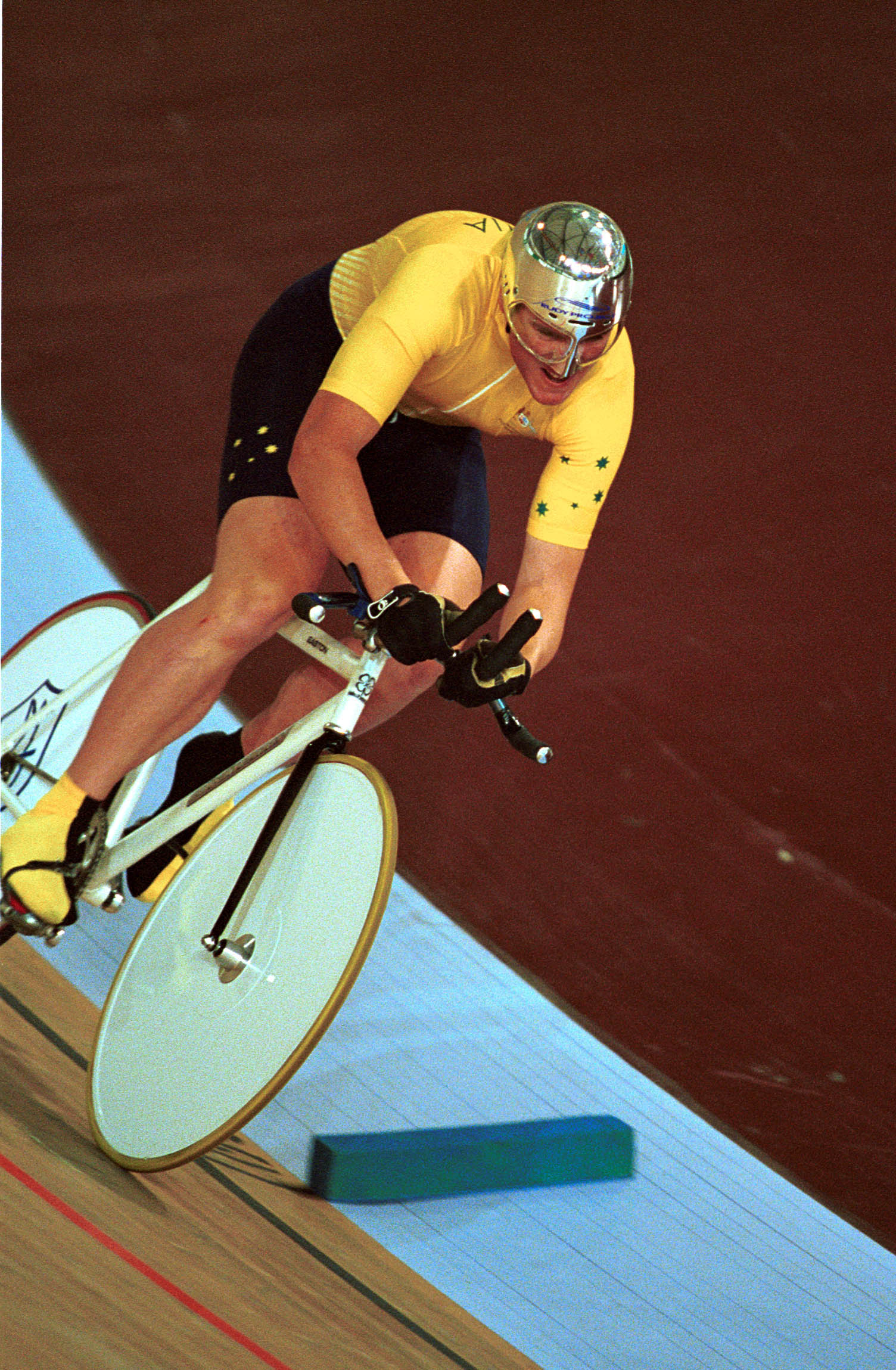
Action shot of Gray during the 2000 Summer Paralympics
