= Silvana Valente =

Italian paralympic cyclist

Personal information
- Nationality: Italian
- Born: 24 November 1963 (age 62) Schio, Italy

Sport
- Country: Italy
- Sport: Cycling
Medal record
Cycling
Representing Italy
Paralympic Games
Silver medal – second place	2000 Sydney	Pursuit
Bronze medal – third place	2000 Sydney	Road Tandem
Bronze medal – third place	2000 Sydney	One km standing start

Silvana Valente (born 24 November 1963) is an Italian paralympic cyclist who has represented Italy at the 2000 Summer Paralympics in the open tandem track events with her guide Fabrizio Di Somma. She also competed at the 1998 World Championships in Colorado Springs. She joined the Italian Paralympic committee in 2009 after other successes at mountain biking.

== Biography ==
Valente was born blind and she is a physiotherapist. She was able to take up competitive track cycling due to an initiative in the city of Vicenza. She competed at the World Para Cycling Championships in 1998 and travelled to Sydney in 2000 to attend the Paralympic Games. She and her tandem partner, Fabrizio Di Somma. took the silver medal in the pursuit as well to other bronze medals.

Valente won numerous Italian national competitions before taking up mountain biking where she was again successful. In 2009 she joined the Italian Paralympic committee. She has published two books of poetry.
