= Fabrizio Di Somma =

Italian Paralympic cyclist (1971–2025)

Personal information
- Born: 15 January 1971 Latina, Italy
- Died: 21 March 2025 (aged 54) Latina, Italy

Sport
- Country: Italy
- Sport: Para cycling
Medal record
Event	1st	2nd	3rd
Paralympic Games	0	1	2<! --
World Para Cycling C'ships			-->

Fabrizio Di Somma (15 January 1971 – 21 March 2025) was an Italian Paralympic cyclist who won three medals at the Summer Paralympics. He died on 21 March 2025, at the age of 54.
