= Daniel Polson =

Australian Paralympic cyclist

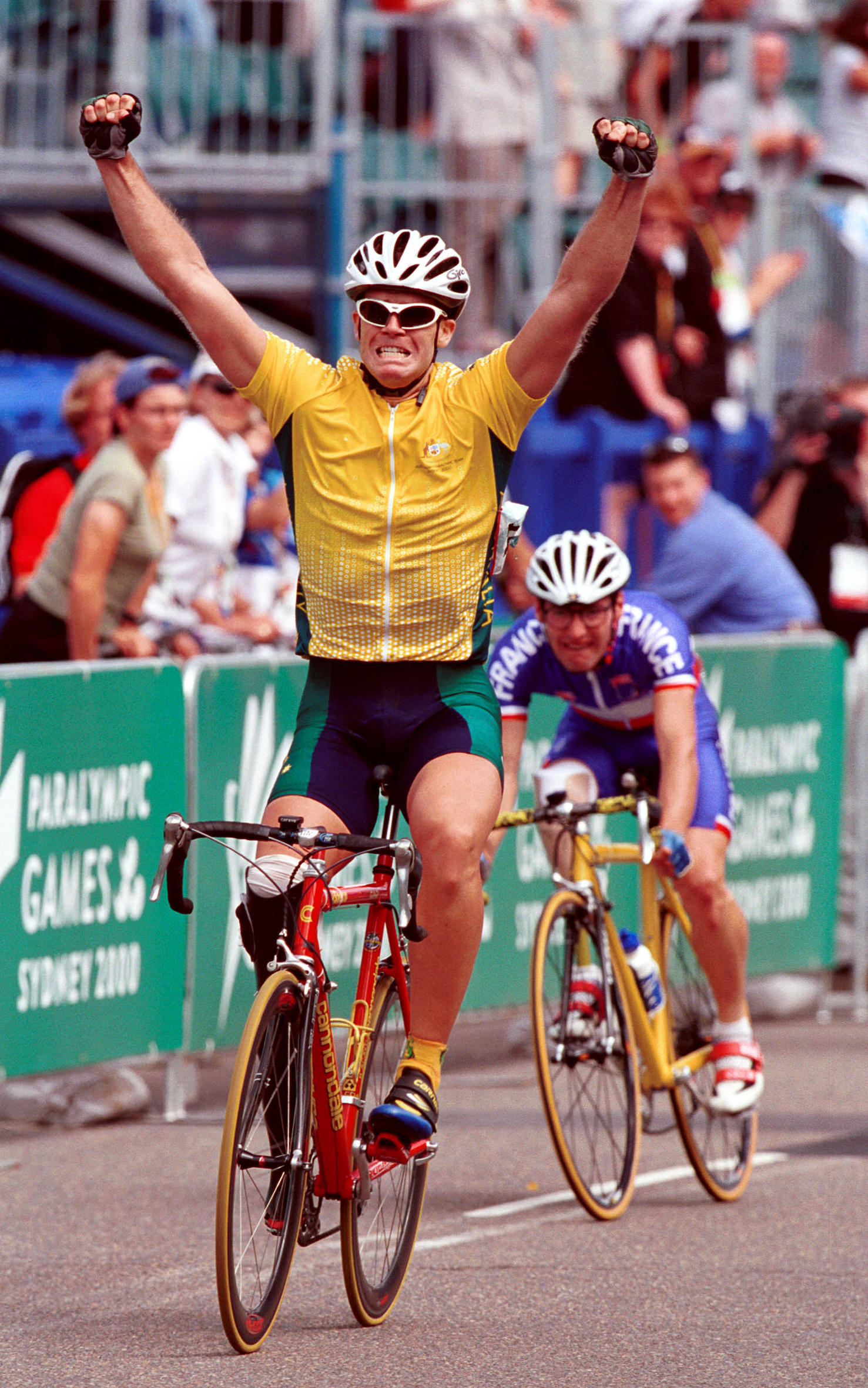
- Daniel Polson wins gold in Sydney

Personal information
- Full name: Daniel Luke Polson
- Nationality: Australia
- Born: 6 January 1974 (age 52) Adelaide, South Australia
Medal record
Cycling
Paralympic Games
Gold medal – first place	2000 Sydney	Mixed Bicycle Road Race LC2

Daniel Luke Polson, OAM (born 6 January 1974) in Adelaide, South Australia is an Australian Paralympic cyclist. He won a gold medal at the 2000 Sydney Games in the Mixed Bicycle Road Race LC2 event, for which he received a Medal of the Order of Australia.
