= Eddy Hollands =

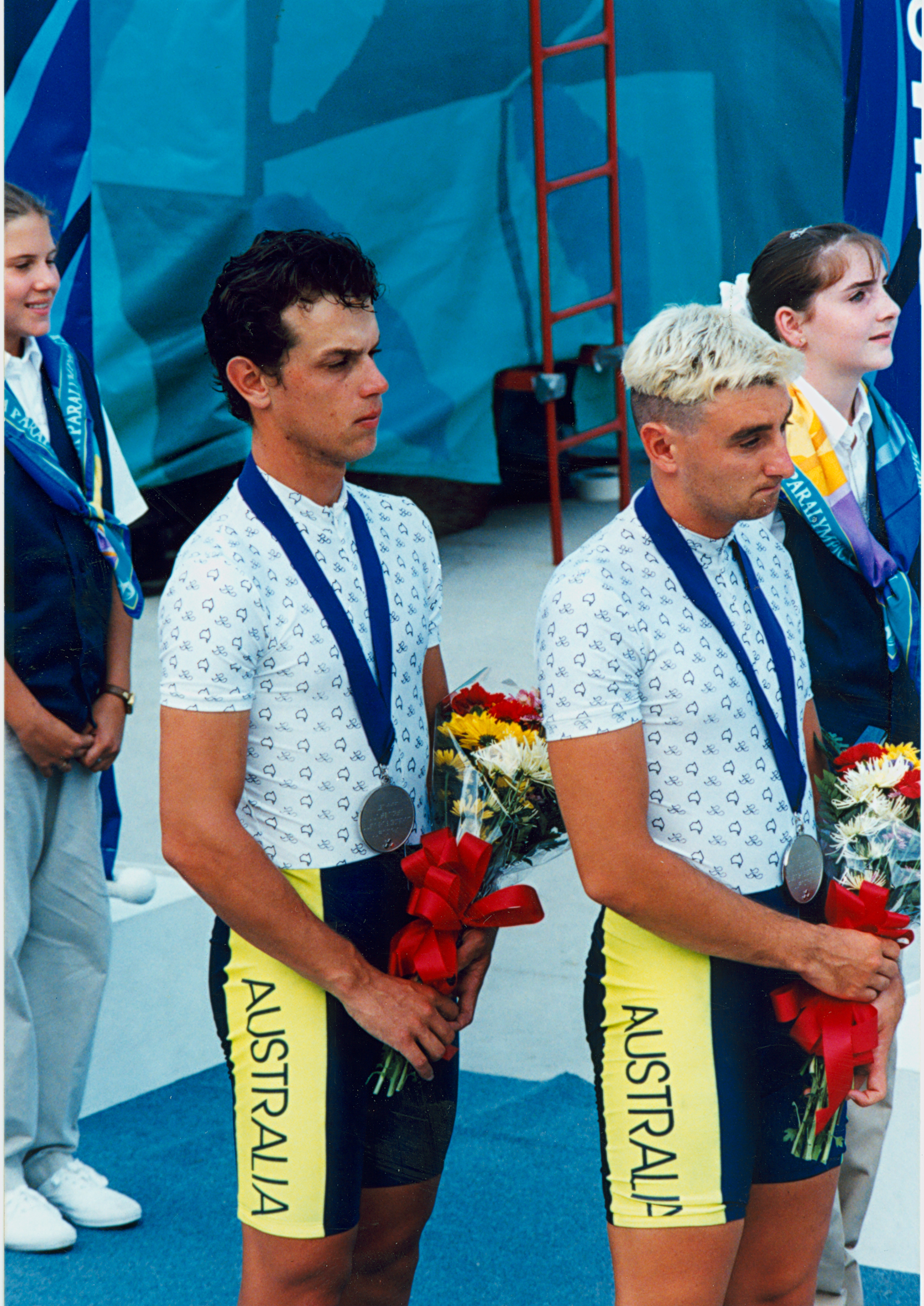
- Eddy Hollands (left) and Paul Clohessy with their silver medals for the Tandem Individual Pursuit at the 1996 Paralympics.

Personal information
- Nationality: Australia
- Born: 6 January 1973 (age 53) Wagin, Western Australia
Medal record
Cycling
Paralympic Games
Silver medal – second place	1996 Atlanta	Men's Individual Pursuit Tandem open
Bronze medal – third place	2000 Sydney	Men's 1 km Time Trial Tandem open
IPC Track and Road World Championships
Gold medal – first place	1994 Hasselt	Men's Time Trial B & VI
Gold medal – first place	1994 Hasselt	Men's Individual Pursuit B & VI
Gold medal – first place	1998 Colorado Springs	Men's Time Trial B & VI
Gold medal – first place	1998 Colorado Springs	Men's Individual Pursuit B & VI
Bronze medal – third place	1998 Colorado Springs	Men's Sprint B & VI

Eddy Hollands (born 6 January 1973 in Wagin, Western Australia) is an Australian Paralympic tandem cycling pilot, who won medals with the vision impaired rider Paul Clohessy. He won a silver medal at the 1996 Atlanta Games in the Men's Individual Pursuit Tandem open event. At the 2000 Sydney Games, he won a bronze medal in the Men's 1 km Time Trial Tandem open event.

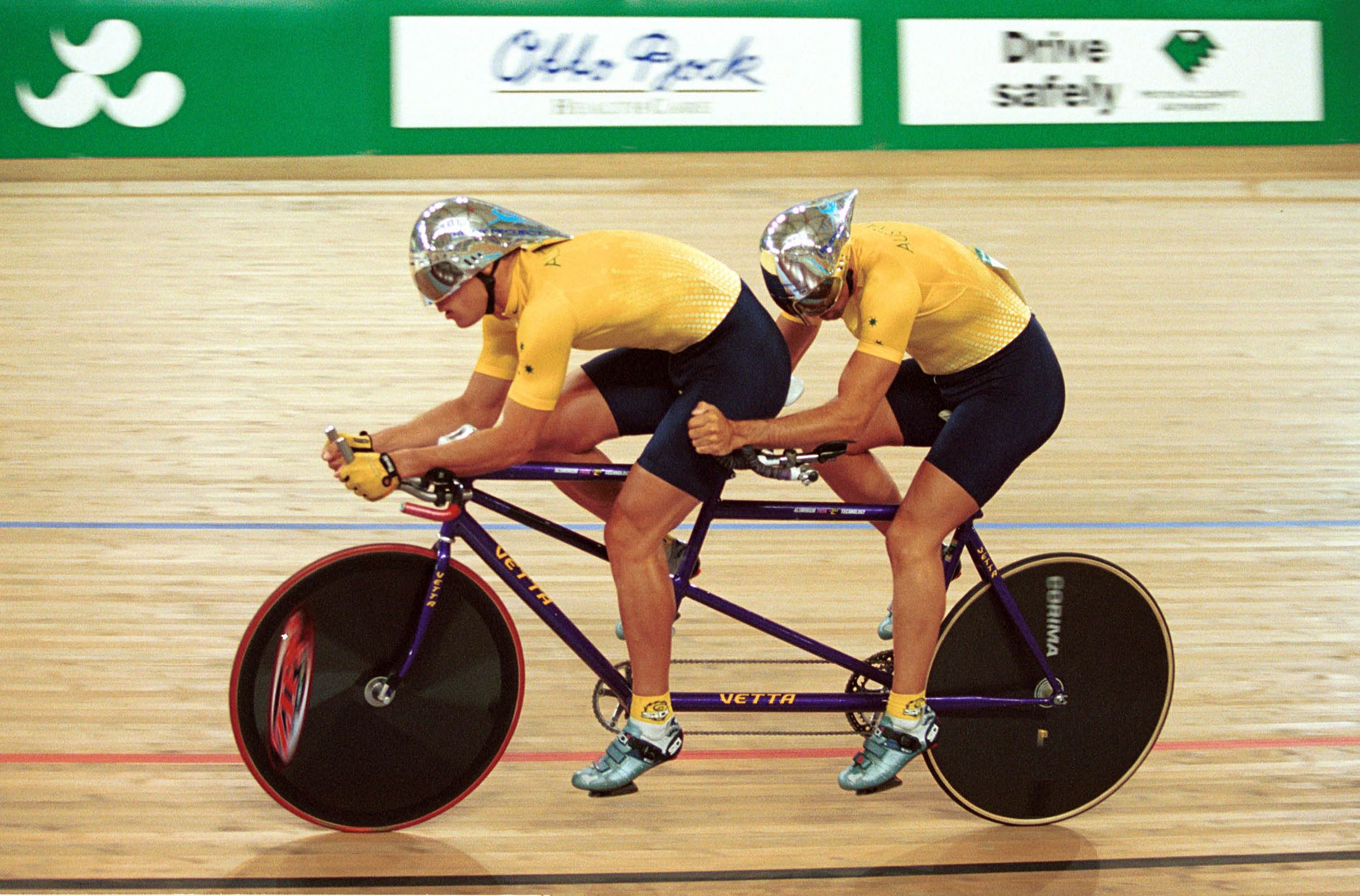
Action shot of Australian track cyclists Eddie Hollands and Paul Clohessy during the 2000 Sydney Paralympic Games.
