= Paul Lake (cyclist) =

Australian Paralympic cyclist

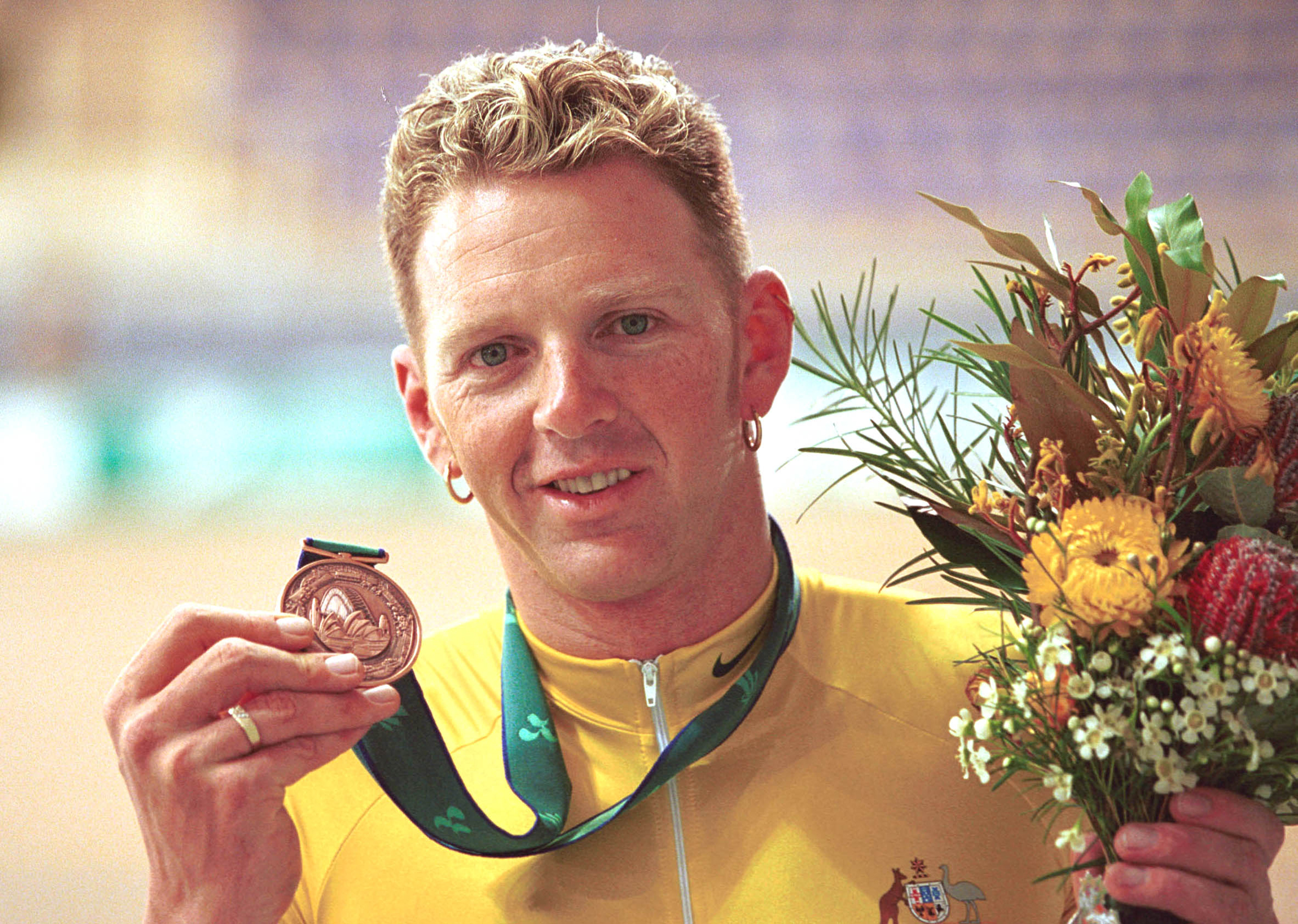
- Lake shows his bronze medal which he won at the 2000 Summer Paralympics LC2 1 km Time Trial

Personal information
- Full name: Paul John Lake
- Nationality: Australia
- Born: 6 June 1970 (age 56) Melbourne
Medal record
Cycling
Paralympic Games
Gold medal – first place	2000 Sydney	Mixed Team Olympic Sprint LC1–3
Silver medal – second place	1996 Atlanta	Mixed Omnium LC2
Silver medal – second place	2000 Sydney	Mixed Individual Pursuit LC2
Bronze medal – third place	2000 Sydney	Mixed 1 km Time Trial LC2
IPC Track and Road World Championships
Gold medal – first place	1994 Hasselt	Men's Individual Pursuit LC2
Silver medal – second place	1994 Hasselt	Men's Road Race Time Trial LC2
Bronze medal – third place	1994 Hasselt	Men's Sprint LC2
Silver medal – second place	1998 Colorado Springs	Mixed Individual Pursuit LC2
Bronze medal – third place	1998 Colorado Springs	Mixed Road Race Time Trial LC2

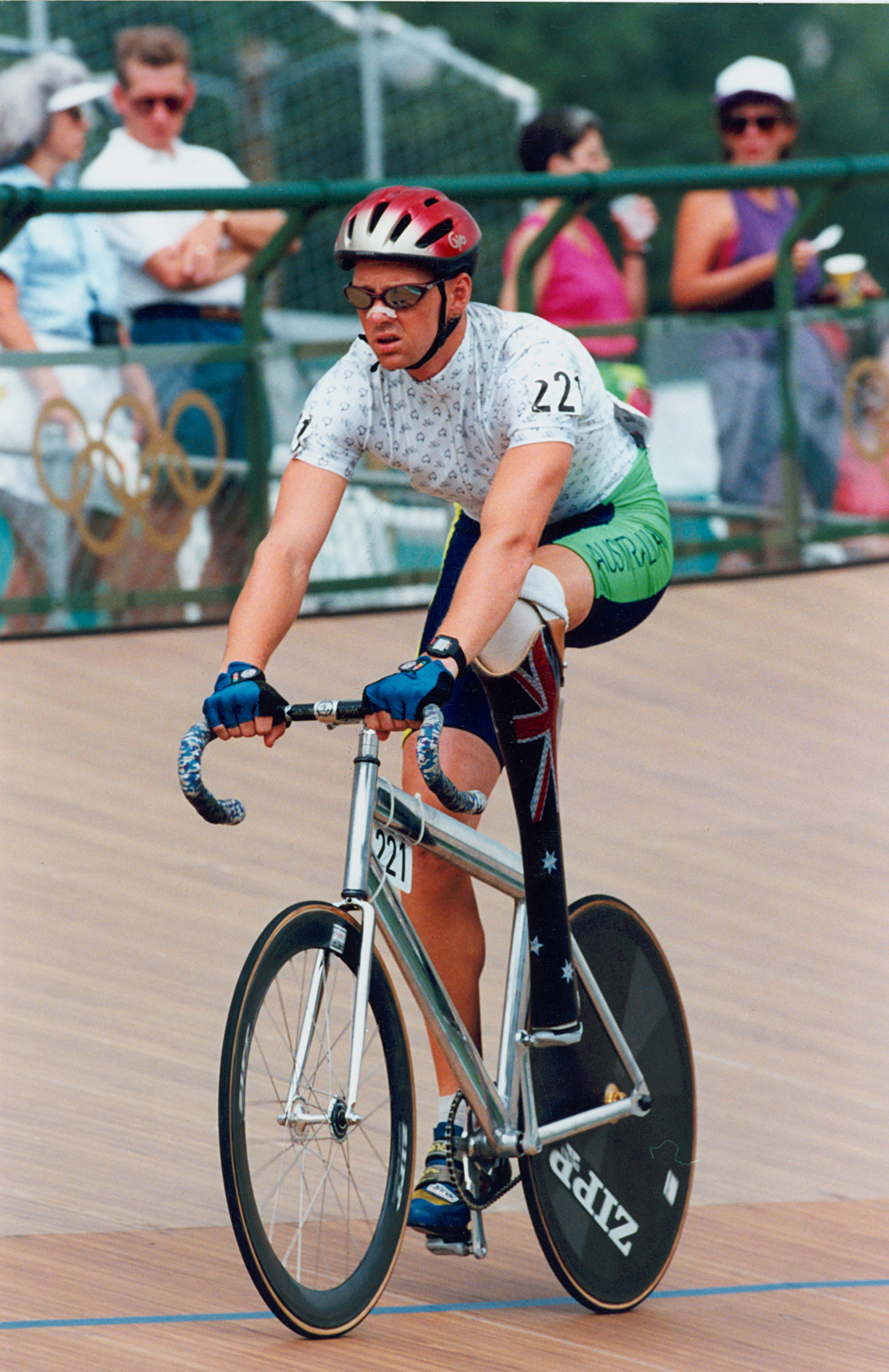
Paul Lake in the LC1 omnium event at the 1996 Summer Paralympics

Paul John Lake, OAM (born 6 June 1970) is an Australian Paralympic cyclist. He was born in Melbourne. He won a silver medal at the 1996 Atlanta Games in the Mixed Omnium LC2 event. At the 2000 Sydney Games, he won a gold medal in the Mixed Team Olympic Sprint LC1–3 event, for which he received a Medal of the Order of Australia, a silver medal in the Mixed Individual Pursuit LC2 event, and a bronze medal in the Mixed 1 km Time Trial LC2 event. He was an Australian Institute of Sport scholarship holder in 1995 and 1997.
