= Andrew Panazzolo =

Australian Paralympic cyclist

Personal information
- Nationality: Australia
- Born: 23 January 1979 (age 47) Adelaide, South Australia
Medal record
Cycling
Paralympic Games
Silver medal – second place	2004 Athens	Men's 1 km Time Trial Bicycle CP Div 3/4
Bronze medal – third place	2004 Athens	Men's Individual Pursuit Bicycle CP Div 3
UCI Para-cycling Track World Championships
Silver medal – second place	2011 Montichiari	Men's time trial C2

Andrew Panazzolo (born 23 January 1979) is a Paralympic cycling competitor from Australia. He was born in Adelaide, South Australia. He won a bronze medal at the 2004 Athens Games in the Men's Individual Pursuit Bicycle CP Div 3 event and a silver medal in the Men's 1 km Time Trial Bicycle CP Div 3/4 event.
