= Paul Clohessy =

Australian Paralympic cyclist

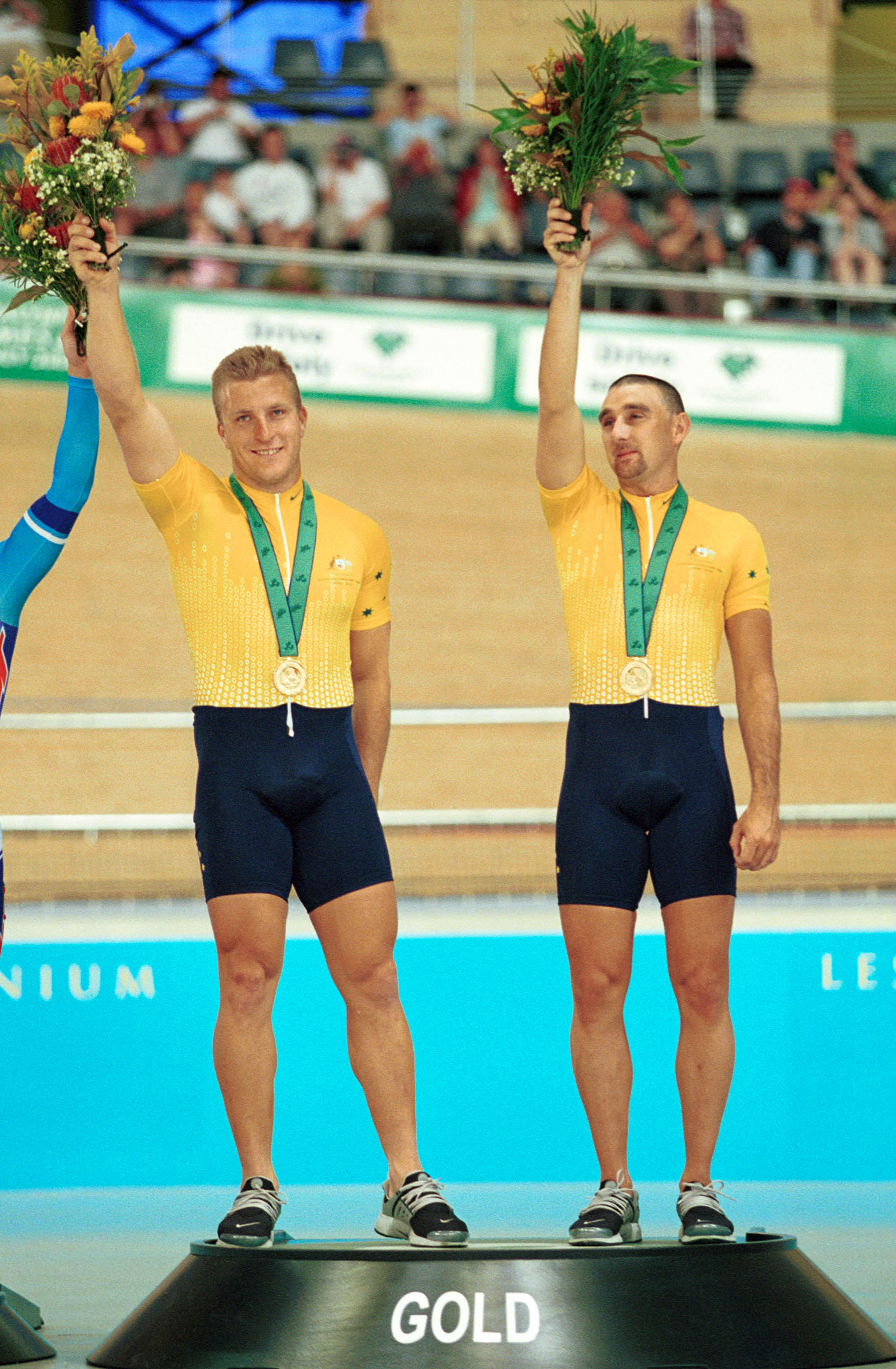
- Clohessy and his cycling partner Darren Harry on the gold medal podium after winning the Men's Tandem Sprint Open at the 2000 Summer Paralympics

Personal information
- Full name: Paul Clohessy
- Nationality: Australia
- Born: 11 November 1970 (age 55) Perth, Western Australia
Medal record
Cycling
Paralympic Games
Silver medal – second place	1996 Atlanta	Men's Individual Pursuit Tandem open
Gold medal – first place	2000 Sydney	Men's Tandem Sprint open
Bronze medal – third place	2000 Sydney	Men's 1 km Time Trial Tandem open
IPC Track and Road World Championships
Gold medal – first place	1994 Hasselt	Men's Time Trial B & VI
Gold medal – first place	1994 Hasselt	Men's Individual Pursuit B & VI
Gold medal – first place	1998 Colorado Springs	Men's Time Trial B & VI
Gold medal – first place	1998 Colorado Springs	Men's Individual Pursuit B & VI
Bronze medal – third place	1998 Colorado Springs	Men's Sprint B & VI

Paul Clohessy, OAM (born 11 November 1970) is an Australian vision impaired tandem cyclist. He was born in Perth, Western Australia. He represented Australia at the three Paralympic Games - 1992, 1996 and 2000. He was also an Australian Institute of Sport scholarship holder in 1997 and 2000 in cycling.

== Paralympics ==
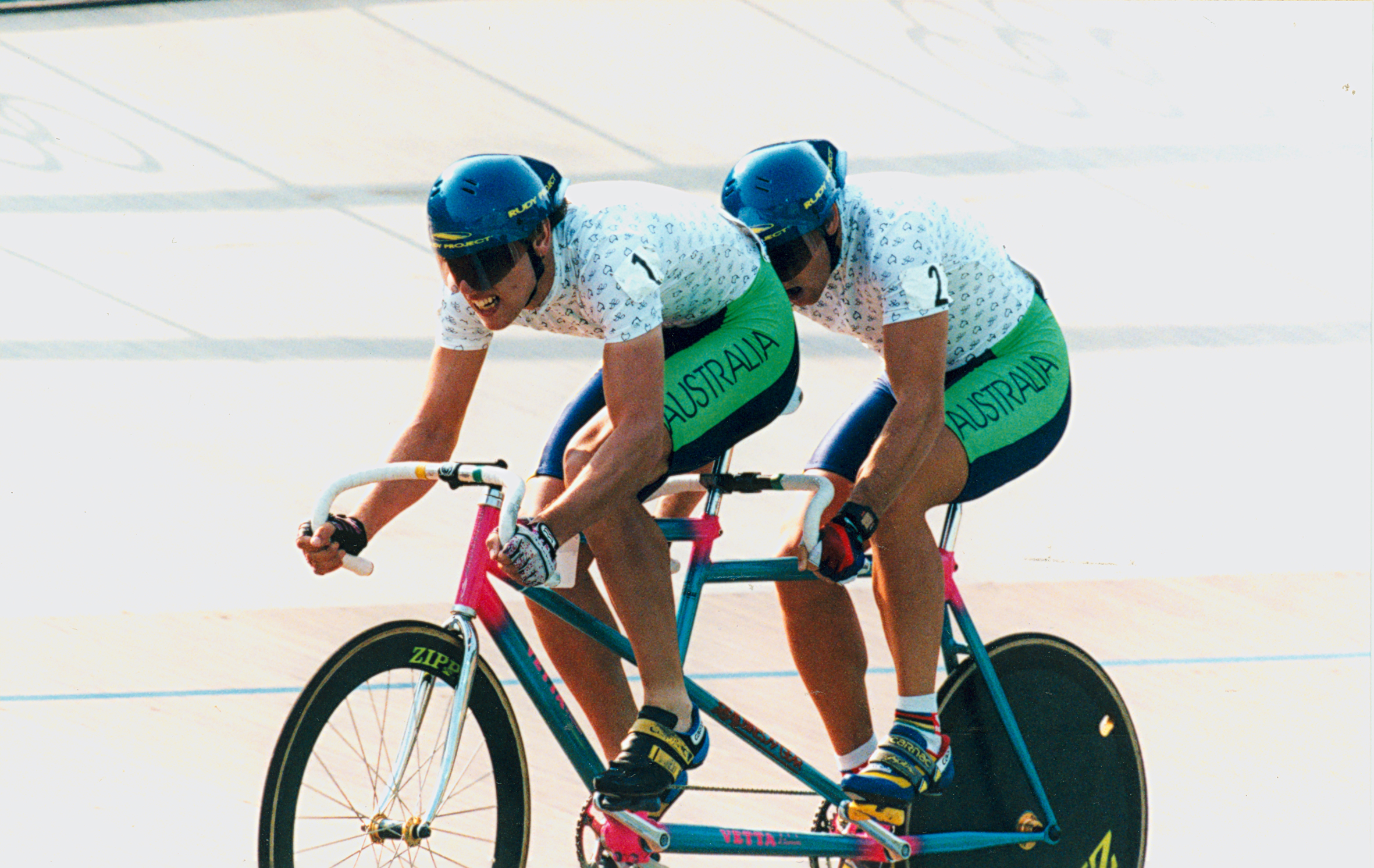
Eddie Hollands (left) and Paul Clohessy (right) of Australia in action during the Atlanta 1996 Paralympic Games

He competed but did not win any medals in his first Paralympics Games at the 1992 Barcelona Games. At the 1996 Atlanta Games, he won a silver medal in the Men's Individual Pursuit Tandem open event with his cycling partner Eddy Hollands. At the 2000 Sydney Games, he won a gold medal in the Men's Sprint Tandem open event with his cycling partner Darren Harry, for which he received a Medal of the Order of Australia, and a bronze medal in the Men's 1 km Time Trial Tandem open event with Hollands.

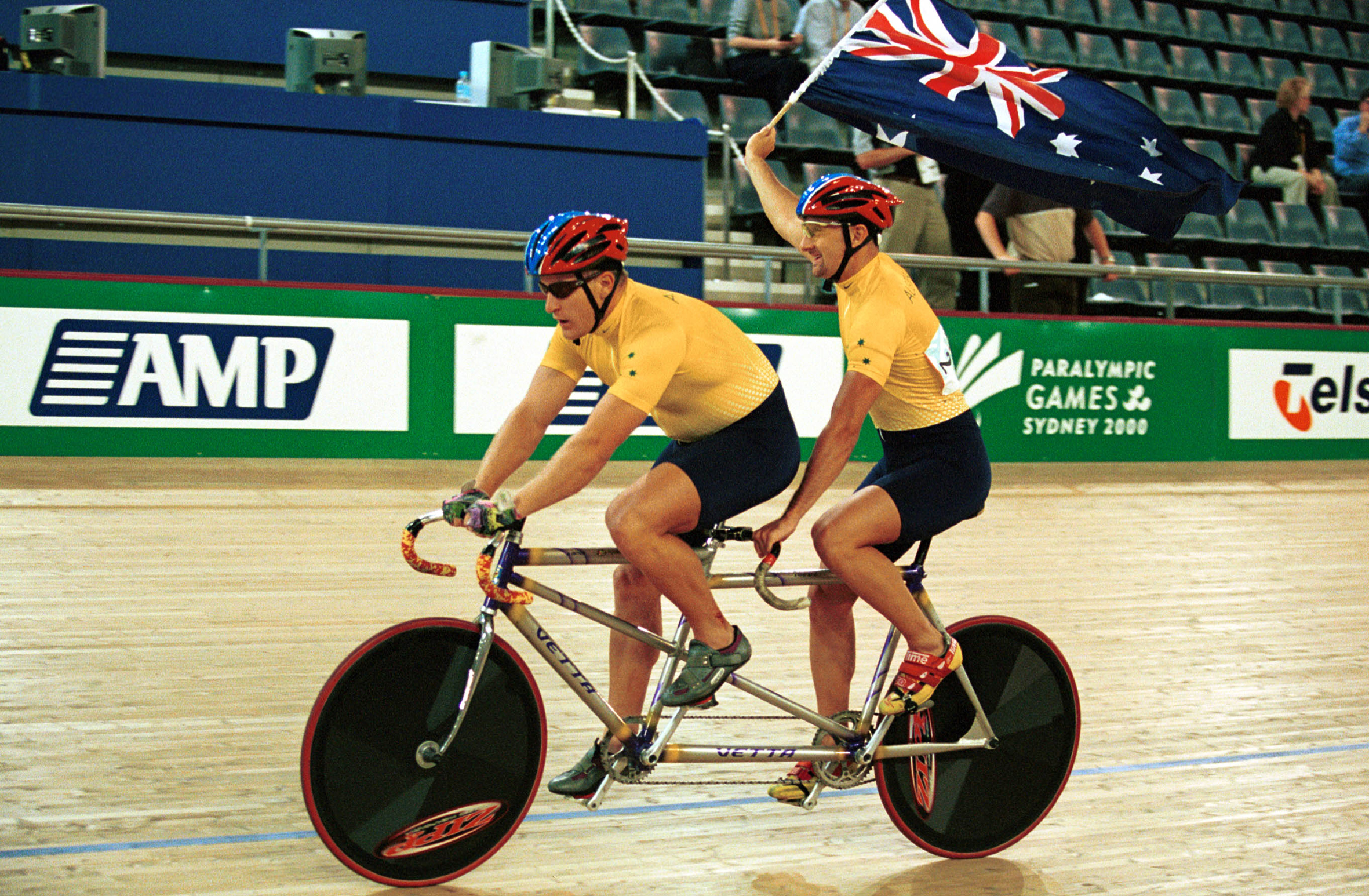
Darren Harry and Paul Clohessy of Australia during the Sydney 2000 Paralympics Games
