= Toireasa Gallagher =

Australian cyclist (born 1980)

Personal information
- Nationality: Australia
- Born: 24 June 1980 (age 46) Bathurst, New South Wales
Medal record
Women's cycling
Representing Australia
Paralympic Games
Silver medal – second place	2004 Athens	Road Race / Time Trial Tandem B1-3
Silver medal – second place	2004 Athens	Individual Pursuit Tandem B1-3
Silver medal – second place	2008 Beijing	Individual Pursuit B VI 1–3
Bronze medal – third place	2008 Beijing	1 km Time Trial B VI 1–3

Toireasa Gallagher née Ryan (born 24 June 1980) is an Australian cyclist. She was born in the New South Wales city of Bathurst. Before the 2004 Athens Paralympics, she piloted Lindy Hou in the tandem pursuit and road races; after the games, she was Hou's sole pilot. At the Athens Games, she won two silver medals in the Women's Road Race / Time Trial Tandem B1–3 and Women's Individual Pursuit Tandem B1–3 events. At the 2006 IPC World Cycling Championships, she won two gold medals. At the 2008 Beijing Games, she won a silver medal in the Women's Individual Pursuit B VI 1–3 event and a bronze medal in the Women's 1 km Time Trial B VI 1–3 event.
