= Paul O'Neill (cyclist) =

Australian Paralympic cyclist

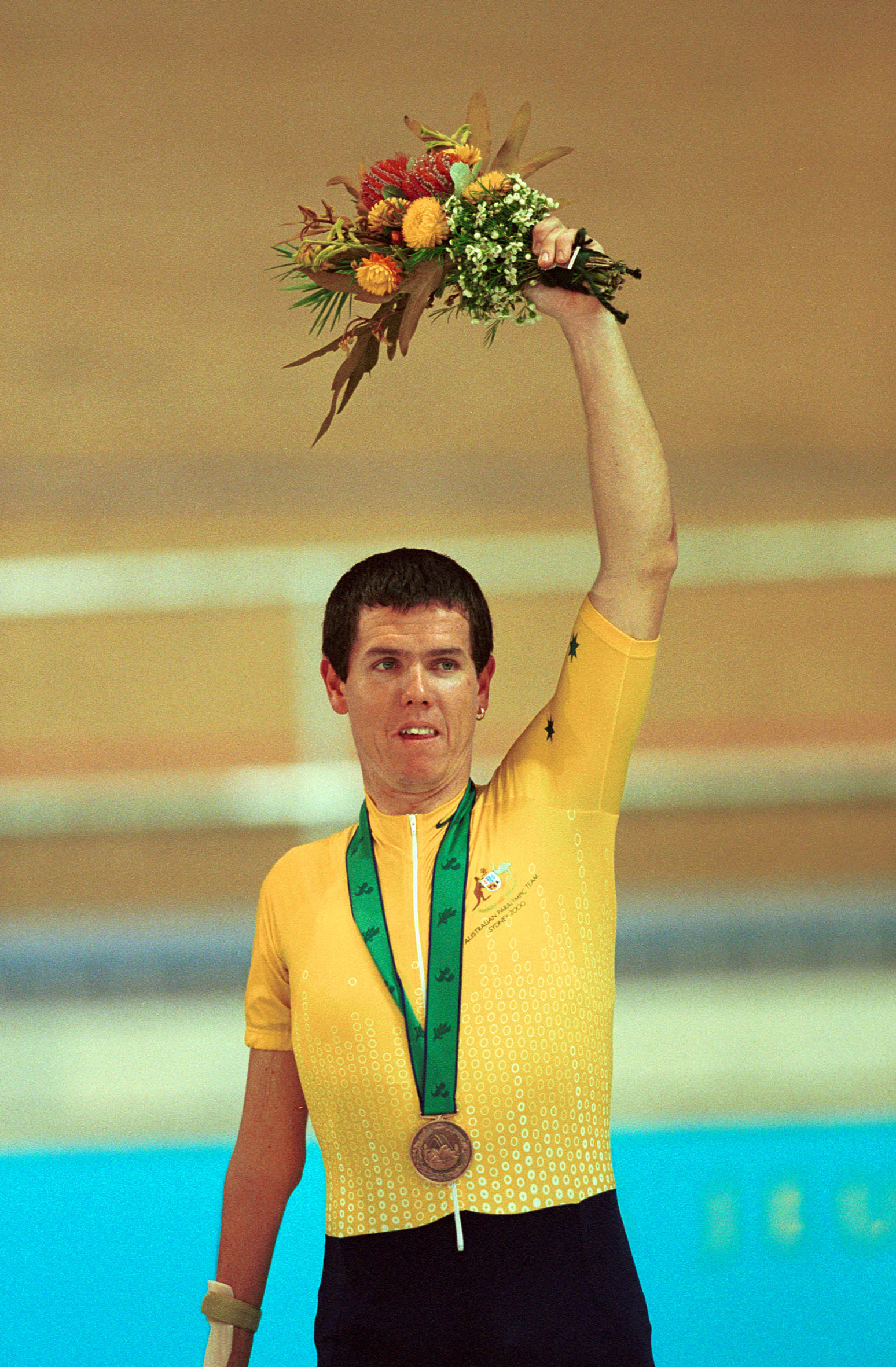
- O'Neill on the podium with his bronze medal won at the 2000 Summer Paralympics LC1 1 km Time Trial

Personal information
- Nationality: Australia
Medal record
Cycling
Paralympic Games
Silver medal – second place	2000 Sydney	Mixed Bicycle Road Race LC1
Bronze medal – third place	2000 Sydney	Mixed 1 km Time Trial LC1
Bronze medal – third place	2000 Sydney	Mixed Individual Pursuit LC1
IPC Track and Road World Championships
Bronze medal – third place	1998 Colorado Springs	Mixed Individual Pursuit LC1
Bronze medal – third place	1998 Colorado Springs	Mixed Time Trial LC1
Bronze medal – third place	1998 Colorado Springs	Mixed Road Time Trial LC1

Paul O'Neill is an Australian Paralympic cyclist. At the 2000 Sydney Games, he won a silver medal in the Mixed Bicycle Road Race LC1 event and two bronze medals in the Mixed 1 km Time Trial LC1 and the Mixed Individual Pursuit LC1.
