= Darren Harry =

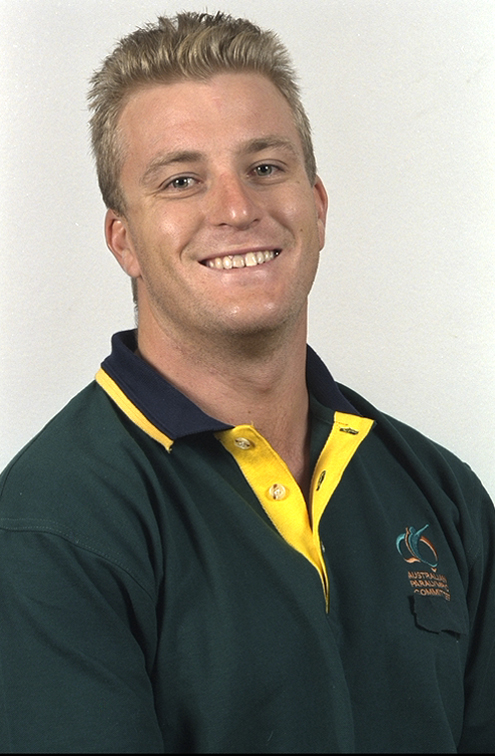
- 2000 Australian Paralympic team portrait of Harry

Personal information
- Full name: Darren Harry
- Nationality: Australia
- Born: 11 November 1975 (age 50) Wonthaggi, Victoria
Medal record
Cycling
Paralympic Games
Gold medal – first place	2000 Sydney	Men's tandem sprint open

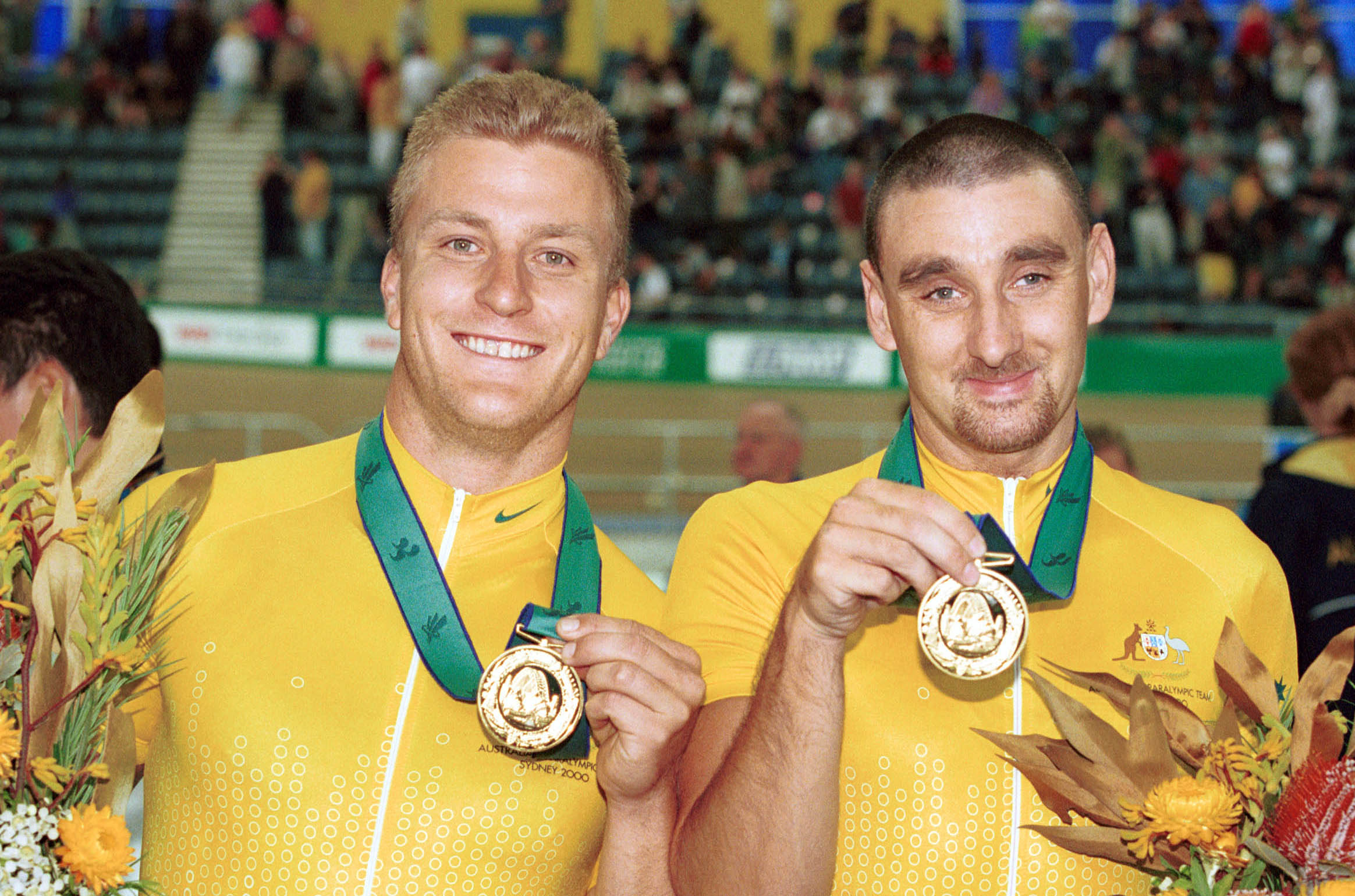
Harry (left) and cycling partner Paul Clohessy (right) showing their gold medals won in the 2000 Summer Paralympics Men's Tandem Sprint

Darren Harry, OAM (born 11 November 1975 in Wonthaggi, Victoria) is an Australian Paralympic tandem cycling pilot. He won a gold medal at the 2000 Sydney Games in the men's tandem sprint open event with Paul Clohessy, for which he received a Medal of the Order of Australia.
