= Lynette Nixon =

Australian Paralympic tandem cycling pilot

Lynette Nixon OAM
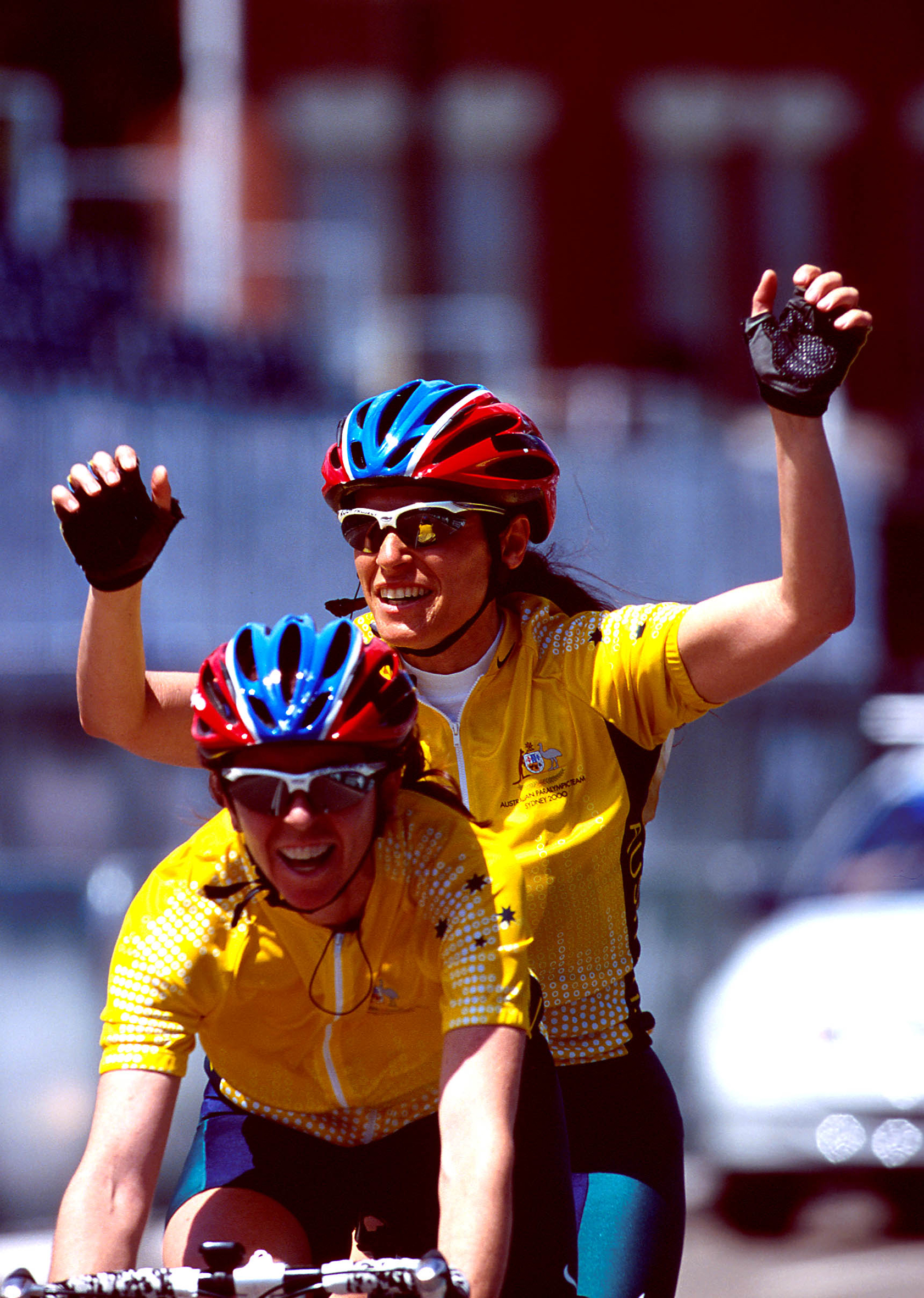
- Nixon (pilot - shown front) and her cycling partner Lyn Lepore celebrate their gold medal win in the 2000 Summer Paralympics Women's Tandem Open road race

Personal information
- Full name: Lynette Nixon
- Nationality: Australia
Medal record
Cycling
Paralympic Games
Gold medal – first place	2000 Sydney	Women's Tandem open
Silver medal – second place	2000 Sydney	Women's 1 km Time Trial Tandem open
Bronze medal – third place	2000 Sydney	Women's Individual Pursuit Tandem open

Lynette Nixon is an Australian Paralympic tandem cycling pilot. At the 2000 Sydney Games, she won a gold medal in the Women's Tandem open event, for which she received a Medal of the Order of Australia, a silver medal in the Women's 1 km Time Trial Tandem open event and a bronze medal in the Women's Individual Pursuit Open event, riding with Lyn Lepore.
