= Mark le Flohic =

Australian Paralympic cyclist

Personal information
- Full name: Mark le Flohic
- Nationality: Australia
- Born: 4 December 1970 (age 55) Perth, Western Australia
Medal record
Cycling
Paralympic Games
Gold medal – first place	2000 Sydney	Mixed Bicycle Time Trial CP Div 4
Gold medal – first place	2004 Athens	Men's Tricycle Road Race CP Div 1/2
Silver medal – second place	2004 Athens	Men's Tricycle Time Trial CP Div 1/2
Bronze medal – third place	2000 Sydney	Mixed Tricycle 1.9 km Time Trial CP Div 2
IPC Track and Road World Championships
Gold medal – first place	2002 Altenstadt	Men's Road Time Trial CP2
Bronze medal – third place	2006 Aigle	Men's Road Time Trial CP2

Mark le Flohic, OAM (born 4 December 1970) is a Paralympic cyclist from Western Australia, Australia.

He was born in Perth, Western Australia. He won a gold medal at the 2000 Sydney Games in the Mixed Bicycle Time Trial CP Div 4 event, for which he received a Medal of the Order of Australia, and a bronze medal in the Mixed Tricycle 1.9 km Time Trial CP Div 2 event. At the 2004 Athens Games, he won a gold medal in the Men's Tricycle Road Race CP Div 1/2 event and a silver medal in the Men's Tricycle Time Trial CP Div 1/2 event.

Le Flohic was a Western Australian Institute of Sport (WAIS) scholarship holder and was one of two WAIS athletes which were selected as part of the Australian cycling team for Beijing. On 30 August 2008, he broke his collarbone during training, forcing him to withdraw from the 2008 Beijing Games. Le Flohic sustained the injury in Perth and was forced to have a metal plate inserted in his shoulder. Le Flohic ended his Paralympic career with 2 gold medals, 1 silver medal and 1 bronze medal indicating his success as an Australian Paralympic cyclist.

In his spare time, Le Flohic enjoys playing the sport of Boccia. By participating in this sport, Le Flohic is aiming to encourage young people to participate in disability sports in order to allow for the generation of a new talent pool of wheelchair athletes in Australia. He participated in the 'Great Bike Hike 2012, Perth to Broome'
