= Wheelchair racing at the Summer Olympics =

Wheelchair racing at the Olympic Games

Overview
- Sport: Athletics (demonstration)
- Gender: Men and women
- Years held: 1984 – 2004

Olympic record
- Men: 3:06.75 min Saúl Mendoza (2000)
- Women: 1:53.66 min Chantal Petitclerc (2004)

Wheelchair racing at the Summer Olympics featured as demonstration competitions at the multi-sport event, appearing within the Olympic athletics programme from 1984 to 2004. On each occasion two track races were held: a men's 1500 metres race and a women's 800 metres race. This was the first time events for disabled athletes have featured at the Summer Olympic Games, with the Paralympic Games being the traditional venue for top level para-athletics. The wheelchair races were the second Olympic exhibition event for disabled athletes, following on from the disabled skiing at the 1984 Winter Olympics, held earlier that year.

Unofficial medals were awarded to the competitors by Juan Antonio Samaranch, the International Olympic Committee president. The events were dropped prior to the 2008 Beijing Olympics and multiple Paralympic gold medallist Chantal Petitclerc stated the decision was a major set-back for the sport, as she favoured its official integration as an Olympic sport.

At the inaugural event in 1984 Sharon Hedrick broke the IPC world record to win the women's 800 m in a time of 2:15.73 minutes. This was followed by two record performances in 1992, when Claude Issorat of France set a men's 1500 m record of 3:13.92 minutes and Denmark's Connie Hansen won the 800 m in a record 1:55.62 minutes. The Olympic records for the event were set by Saúl Mendoza, who finished in 3:06.75 minutes to win the 2000 men's 1500 m race, and Chantal Petitclerc, who won the last women's 800 m event in 1:53.66 minutes in 2004. Issorat, Hedrick and Louise Sauvage each won two Olympic wheelchair races; Issorat and Sauvage had three Olympic podium finishes. The United States had the most success in the event, gathering eleven medals over the six editions.

== Medalists ==
=== Men ===
| Games | Gold | Silver | Bronze |
|---|---|---|---|
| 1984 Los Angeles | Paul van Winkel (BEL) | Randy Snow (USA) | André Viger (CAN) |
| 1988 Seoul | Mustapha Badid (FRA) | Paul van Winkel (BEL) | Craig Blanchette (USA) |
| 1992 Barcelona | Claude Issorat (FRA) | Franz Nietlispach (SUI) | Michael Noe (USA) |
| 1996 Atlanta | Claude Issorat (FRA) | Scot Hollonbeck (USA) | Franz Nietlispach (SUI) |
| 2000 Sydney | Saúl Mendoza (MEX) | Claude Issorat (FRA) | Heinz Frei (SUI) |
| 2004 Athens | Robert Figl (GER) | Saúl Mendoza (MEX) | Rawat Tana (THA) |

==== Multiple medalists ====
| Rank | Athlete | Nation | Olympics | Gold | Silver | Bronze | Total |
|---|---|---|---|---|---|---|---|
| 1 | Claude Issorat | France | 1992–2000 | 2 | 1 | 0 | 3 |
| 2= | Paul van Winkel | Belgium | 1984–1988 | 1 | 1 | 0 | 2 |
| 2= | Saúl Mendoza | Mexico | 2000–2004 | 1 | 1 | 0 | 2 |
| 4 | Franz Nietlispach | Switzerland | 1992–1996 | 0 | 1 | 1 | 2 |

==== Medalists by country ====
| Rank | Nation | Gold | Silver | Bronze | Total |
|---|---|---|---|---|---|
| 1 | France | 3 | 1 | 0 | 4 |
| 2= | Belgium | 1 | 1 | 0 | 2 |
| 2= | Mexico | 1 | 1 | 0 | 2 |
| 4 | Germany | 1 | 0 | 0 | 1 |
| 5 | United States | 0 | 2 | 2 | 4 |
| 6 | Switzerland | 0 | 1 | 2 | 3 |
| 7= | Canada | 0 | 0 | 1 | 1 |
| 7= | Thailand | 0 | 0 | 1 | 1 |

=== Women ===
| Games | Gold | Silver | Bronze |
|---|---|---|---|
| 1984 Los Angeles | Sharon Hedrick (USA) | Monica Wetterström (SWE) | Candace Cable (USA) |
| 1988 Seoul | Sharon Hedrick (USA) | Connie Hansen (DEN) | Candace Cable (USA) |
| 1992 Barcelona | Connie Hansen (DEN) | Jean Driscoll (USA) | Monica Wetterström (SWE) |
| 1996 Atlanta | Louise Sauvage (AUS) | Jean Driscoll (USA) | Cheri Becerra (USA) |
| 2000 Sydney | Louise Sauvage (AUS) | Wakako Tsuchida (JPN) | Ariadne Hernández (MEX) |
| 2004 Athens | Chantal Petitclerc (CAN) | Eliza Stankovich (AUS) | Louise Sauvage (AUS) |

==== Multiple medalists ====
| Rank | Athlete | Nation | Olympics | Gold | Silver | Bronze | Total |
|---|---|---|---|---|---|---|---|
| 1 | Louise Sauvage | Australia | 1996–2004 | 2 | 0 | 1 | 3 |
| 2 | Sharon Hedrick | United States | 1984–1988 | 2 | 0 | 0 | 2 |
| 3 | Connie Hansen | Denmark | 1988–1992 | 1 | 1 | 0 | 2 |
| 4 | Jean Driscoll | United States | 1992–1996 | 0 | 2 | 0 | 2 |
| 5 | Monica Wetterström | Sweden | 1984–1992 | 0 | 1 | 1 | 2 |
| 6 | Candace Cable | United States | 1984–1988 | 0 | 0 | 2 | 2 |

==== Medalists by country ====
| Rank | Nation | Gold | Silver | Bronze | Total |
|---|---|---|---|---|---|
| 1 | United States | 2 | 2 | 3 | 7 |
| 2 | Australia | 2 | 1 | 1 | 4 |
| 3 | Denmark | 1 | 1 | 0 | 2 |
| 4 | Canada | 1 | 0 | 0 | 1 |
| 5 | Sweden | 0 | 1 | 1 | 2 |
| 6 | Japan | 0 | 1 | 0 | 1 |
| 7 | Mexico | 0 | 0 | 1 | 1 |
