= International Paralympic Committee =

Global governing body for the Paralympic Movement

Coordinates: 50°43′10″N 7°06′58″E

- Internationales Paralympisches Komitee (German)
- Abbreviation: IPC
- Formation: 22 September 1989; 37 years ago
- Type: Sports federation
- Headquarters: Bonn, Germany
- Members: 187 National Paralympic Committees (September 2025)
- Official language: English and the host country's official language when necessary
- President: (Brazil) Andrew Parsons
- Vice Presidents: (Portugal) Leila Marques Mota (Denmark) John Petersson
- Website: www.paralympic.org

The International Paralympic Committee (IPC; German: Internationales Paralympisches Komitee) is an international non-profit organisation and the global governing body for the Paralympic Movement.

The IPC's mission is to lead the Paralympic Movement, oversee the delivery of the Paralympic Games and support its 200 plus member organisations to enable Para athletes to achieve sporting excellence. Founded on 22 September 1989 in Düsseldorf, then part of West Germany, its vision is to "make for an inclusive world through Para sport". Furthermore, the IPC aims to use Para sport as a catalyst to change attitudes, legislation, and create greater opportunities for the world's 1.3 billion persons with disabilities.

The IPC has a democratic constitution and structure and is composed of representatives from 187 National Paralympic Committees (NPCs), 18 International Federations, three International Organizations of Sport for the Disabled (IOSDs) and five regional organizations. (Note: IPC contains Asian Paralympic Committee (AsPC), African Paralympic Committee (AfPC), Americas Paralympic Committee (AmPC), European Paralympic Committee (EPC), Oceania Paralympic Committee (OPC).) The IPC's headquarters is located in Bonn, Germany.

== Overview ==
On the basis of being able to organize the Paralympic Games more efficiently and to give the Paralympic Movement one voice, the four international organizations of sports for disabled people founded the International Co-ordination Committee of World Sports Organizations for the Disabled (ICC) in 1982. In the upcoming years, other organizations joined and the need for a democratically guided organization emerged, as demanded by the nations participating in the Paralympic Movement. They desired a democratic structure, to improve national and regional representation, which led to the foundation of the IPC as it is known today. The 1994 Paralympic Winter Games, in Norway, were the first to be organized by the IPC.

With its 211 member organizations, the IPC functions as an umbrella organization, in contrast to other international sports organizations for athletes with a disability, which are predominantly limited to a single sport or disability.

A 12-strong Governing Board is responsible for the governance of the IPC between meetings of the General Assembly. Robert Steadward became the first President in 1989. Since 2017, Andrew Parsons is the IPC president, while Dr Mike Peters PLY was appointed the Chief Executive Officer in 2019.

== Presidents ==
The International Paralympic Committee has had three presidents to date. Its founding president, who presided over it from 1989 to 2001, was the Canadian Robert Steadward, who had previously founded the Canadian Sports Fund for the Physically Disabled. He was succeeded in 2001 by Philip Craven, a British Paralympian and former President of the International Wheelchair Basketball Federation, who served as president until 2017. Craven was succeeded by Brazil's Andrew Parsons, who was IPC Vice President from 2013 to 2017 and a former President of the Brazilian Paralympic Committee.

No.	Portrait	Name (Birth–Death)	Term of office			Country of origin
No.	Portrait	Name (Birth–Death)	Took office	Left office	Time in office	Country of origin
1		Robert Steadward (born 1946)	22 September 1989	8 December 2001	12 years, 77 days	Canada
2		Philip Craven (born 1950)	8 December 2001	8 September 2017	15 years, 274 days	United Kingdom
3		Andrew Parsons (born 1977)	8 September 2017	Incumbent	9 years, 42 days	Brazil

== Governing Board ==
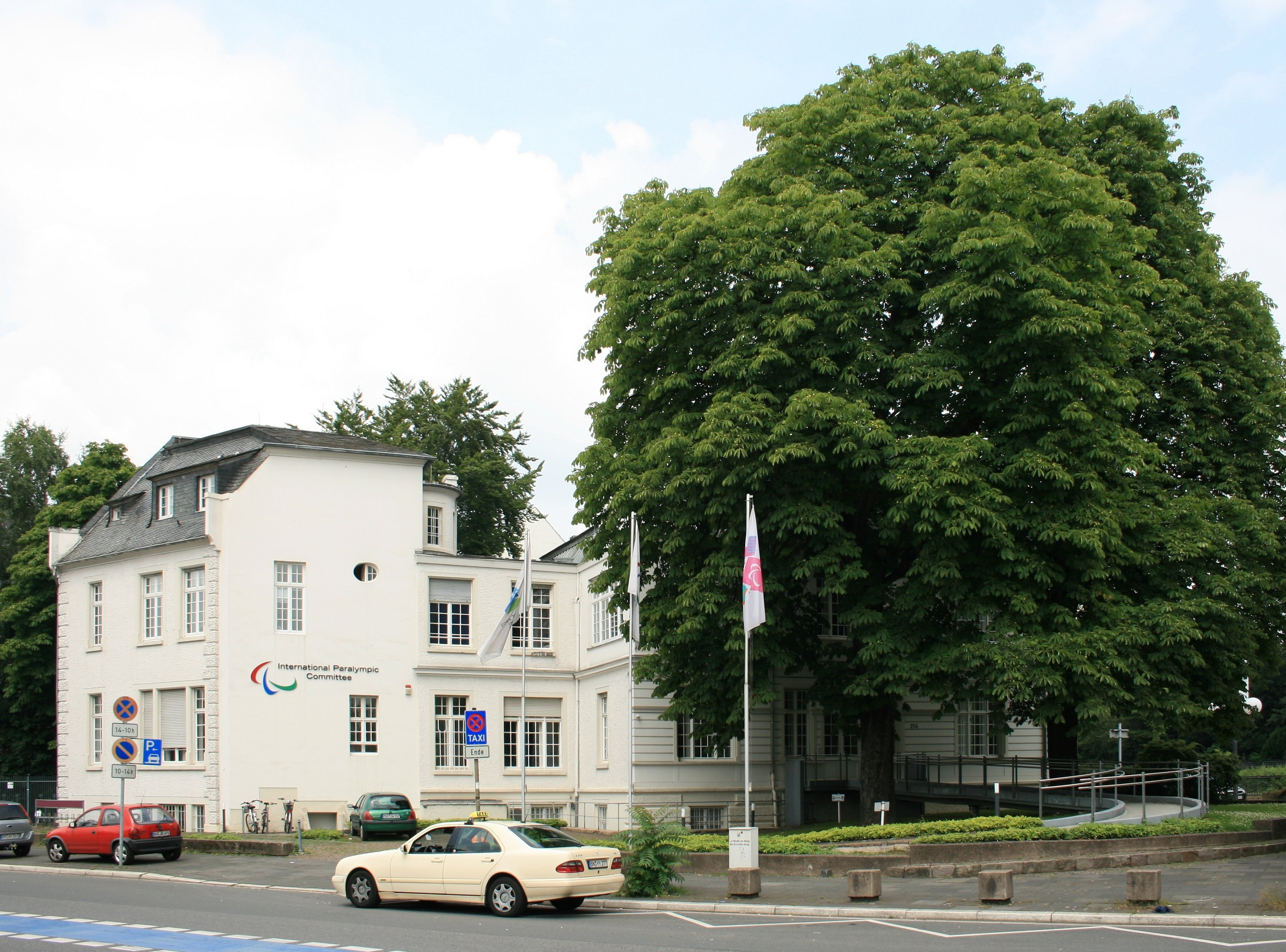
The former IPC headquarters in Bonn

The IPC Governing Board consists of 12 members, of which 10 are elected at the General Assembly, including the President and two Vice Presidents. The most recent election for the Governing Board was held on 27 September 2025 when Andrew Parsons was elected for a third and final term as IPC president.

- Andrew Parsons, President
- Leila Marques Mota PLY, Vice President
- John Petersson PLY, Vice President
- Debra Alexander, Member at Large
- Sh. Mohamed Duaij Alkhalifa, Member at Large
- Chelsey Gotell PLY, Member at Large
- Miki Matheson PLY, Member at Large
- Fernando Riaño, Member at Large
- Robyn Smith,Member at Large
- Bradley Snyder PLY, Member at Large

The IPC Athletes' Council Chairperson, Vladyslava Kravchenko, and IPC Athletes' Council First Vice Chairperson also serve as Board members and have voting rights.

== History ==
Chronology of milestones in the development of the International Paralympic Committee and the Summer and Winter Paralympics.

Year	Event
1944	Dr Ludwig Guttmann established the Spinal Injuries Centre at the Stoke Mandeville Hospital.
1948	On 29 July, the day of the Opening Ceremony of the London 1948 Olympic Games, Dr Ludwig Guttmann organised the first competition for wheelchair athletes which he named the Stoke Mandeville Games, a milestone in Paralympics history. They involved 16 injured servicemen and women who took part in archery
1952	Dutch ex-servicemen travelled to England to compete against British athletes and this led to the establishment of the International Stoke Mandeville Games.
1955	International Committee of Sports for the Deaf (CISS) officially recognized by the International Olympic Committee (IOC).
1960	18–25 September – Rome Summer Paralympics – 400 athletes from 23 countries; 57 events in 8 sports. These Games became known as the 1st Summer Paralympic Games and were the 9th International Stoke Mandeville Games. The Games followed the Rome Olympics and used same venues.
1960	International Stoke Mandeville Games Committee (ISMGC) established.
1962	International Sports Organisation for the Disabled (IOSD) was established to assist visually impaired, amputees, persons with cerebral palsy and paraplegics who were not eligible to compete at the International Stoke Mandeville Games.
1964	3–12 November – Tokyo 1964 Paralympic Games – 375 athletes from 21 countries; 144 events in 9 sports. Weightlifting added to the program. Opening ceremony held in front of 5,000 spectators.
1968	4–13 November – Tel Aviv 1968 Paralympic Games – 750 athletes from 29 countries; 181 events in 10 sports. New sports included lawn bowls, women's basketball and Men's 100m wheelchair race.
1972	2–11 August – Heidelberg Summer Paralympics – 984 athletes from 43 countries; 1987 events in 10 sports. Events for quadriplegic added to program for the first time. Demonstration events for visually impaired athletes. Heidelberg was used as the Olympic Village in Munich was unavailable as it was converted into private apartments.
1976	3–11 August – Toronto Summer Paralympics – 1657 athletes from 38 countries; 447 events in 13 sports. Amputee and vision impaired athletes competed for the first time. goalball, shooting and standing volleyball added to program. Specialized racing wheelchairs used for the first time.
1976	21–28 February – Örnsköldsvik Winter Paralympics – 198 athletes from 16 countries; 53 events in 2 sports. First Winter Paralympics. Games demonstrated innovations in ski equipment design with 'three-track skiing' using crutches. Demonstration event was sledge racing.
1976	UNESCO Conference established the right for people with a disability to participate in sport and physical education.
1980	21–30 June – Arnhem Summer Paralympics – 1973 athletes from 42 countries; 489 events in 12 sports. Sitting volleyball added to the program. Moscow declined to host the Games. Cerebral palsy athletes compete for the first time. There were 12,000 spectators at the opening ceremony.
1980	1–8 February – Geilo Winter Paralympics – 399 athletes from 18 countries 64 events in 2 sports. Amputee, visual impairment and les autres compete for the first time at a Winter Games.
1982	International Co-ordination Committee of World Sports Organisations for the Disabled (ICC) was established by the International Olympic Committee (IOC) due to the need for a single governing body to look after disability sport
1984	17–30 June (US) / 22 July – 1 August (UK) – Stoke Mandeville/New York Summer Paralympics – 1100 athletes from 41 countries (UK) and 1,800 from 45 countries (USA); 903 events in 18 sports. New York Games were held at the Hofstra University and events were held for amputees, les austres, cerebral palsy and vision impaired athletes. Stoke Mandeville Games were for athletes with a spinal cord disability. It was decided that future Games should be held in one city. boccia, road cycling and football 7-a-side added to program.
1984	14-20 January – 1984 Winter Paralympics – Held in Innsbruck,Austria 419 athletes from 21 countries; 107 events in 3 sports. Cerebral palsy athletes compete for the first time. Hosts Austria topped the medals table.
1984	1984 Summer Olympics included Men's 1500m and Women's 800m wheelchair races as demonstration events.
1984	The term Paralympic Games approved by the IOC. It was used in the lead up to the 1988 Seoul Paralympics.
1988	15–24 October – Seoul Summer Paralympics – 3057 athletes from 61 countries; 732 events in 16 sports. The Games utilized Olympic facilities. For the first time short stature athletes competed in the les autres category. Judo was added to the program and Wheelchair tennis was a demonstration sport.
1988	18–25 January – Innsbruck 1984 Paralympic Winter Games – 377 athletes from 22 countries; 97 events in 4 sports. Sit ski events introduced in the sports of alpine and Nordic skiing. Norway topped the medals table.
1989	On 22 September, International Paralympic Committee (IPC) was founded and replaced the ICC as the governing body of the Paralympic movement with Canadian Robert Steadward as its inaugural President.
1990	ISMFG changed its name to International Stoke Mandeville Wheelchair Sports Federation (ISMWSF).
1990	IPC agreement with the ICC so that it remained responsible for the Paralympic Games until after the 1992 Barcelona Paralympic Games.
1992	3–14 September – Barcelona Summer Paralympics – 3001 athletes from 33 countries: 431 events in 16 sports Wheelchair tennis was a medal sport for the first time. IOC President Juan Antonio Samaranch attended and endorsed the Games. Inaugural Paralympics for Persons with an Intellectual Disability held between 15-22 September in Madrid, Spain immediately after the Games. Final Games organized by ICC.
1992	25 March – 2 April – Tignes Albertville 1992 Paralympic Winter Games – 365 athletes from 24 countries; 79 events in 3 sports. Biathlon added to the program. Demonstration events held for athletes with an intellectual disability in alpine and cross country skiing. First Winter Games to share Olympic venues. USA topped the medals table.
1992	The Mind, Body and Spirit logo (3 tae-guks) adopted by IPC and used until 2004.
1993	IPC established a Sport Science Committee.
1994	10–19 March – Lillehammer 1994 Paralympic Winter Games – 469 athletes from 31 countries; 133 events in 5 sports. First Winter Games held under IPC control and Games aligned to revised Winter Olympic Games four-year schedule. Ice sledge hockey added to the program. Norway topped the medals table.
1995	International Committee of Sports for the Deaf (CISS) withdraws from the IPC.
1996	16–25 August – Atlanta Summer Paralympics – 3259 athletes from 104 countries; 508 events in 20 sports. Athletes with an intellectual disability included for the first time at a Summer Games. equestrian and track cycling discipline added to the program and sailing was a demonstration sport. IPC officially hosted the Games for the first time and assumed responsibility for future Games. First Games to attract worldwide sponsorship. 12,000 volunteers assisted with the operation of the Games.
1998	5–14 March – Nagano 1998 Paralympic Winter Games – 562 athletes from 31 countries; 122 events in 4 sports. Athletes with an intellectual disability included for the first time at a Winter Games. With the internet in its infancy, the official website recorded 7.7 million hits during the Games.
1999	IPC moved into its first ever Headquarters in Bonn, Germany. IOC President Juan Antonio Samaranch attended the opening.
1999	INAS-FMH changed its name to International Sports Federation for Persons with Intellectual Disability(INAS-FID).
2000	18–29 October – Sydney Summer Paralympics – 3,881 athletes from 122 countries; 551 events in 20 sports. First Games held in the Southern Hemisphere. Women's events were included in the powerlifting program and wheelchair rugby and sailing were medal sports for the first time. IOC signed a co-operation agreement with IPC to strengthen their relationship. Games had comprehensive international television coverage for the first time. Over 340,000 school children attended and were given an insight into Paralympic sport.
2001	Robert Steadward was succeeded by the British five-time Paralympian Sir Philip Craven after serving three terms as president.
2001	On 19 June, IPC and IOC signed an agreement that ensured the practice of "one bid, one city", meaning the same city will host both the Olympic and Paralympic Games.
2001	IPC General Assembly suspended athletes with an intellectual disability (ID) from the Paralympic Games due to 69% of athletes who won medals in intellectual disability events at the Sydney Games not having the correct ID verification.
2002	7–16 March – Salt Lake City 2002 Paralympic Winter Games – 415 athletes from 36 countries; 92 events in 5 sports. Worldwide television coverage was secured by the organizers, and there was high demand for tickets.
2003	Sir Philip Craven, IPC President elected as a new IOC member at the 115th IOC Session in Prague, Czech Republic.
2003	IPC Governing Board approved the development of a Universal Classification Code.
2003	New Spirit in motion logo (Agitos) adopted by IPC.
2003	IPC signs the World Anti-Doping Code and revised its Anti-Doping Code to comply with the World Anti-Doping Code.
2004	17–28 September – Athens 2004 Paralympic Games – 3808 athletes from 135 countries; 517 events in 19 sports. 5-a-side football added to the program. A cumulated global TV audience of 1.8 billion watch the Athens 2004 Paralympic Games. Over 3000 journalists covered the Games.
2004	International Wheelchair and Amputee Sports Federation (IWSF) established with the merger of ISMWSF and ISOD.
2005	Paralympic Awards are presented for the first time.
2006	10–19 March – Torino 2006 Paralympic Winter Games – 474 athletes from 38 countries; 58 events in 5 sports.A New Classification System for Winter Sports was used for the first time. Wheelchair curling made its Games debut. IPC launched ParalympicSport.TV, an online TV channel, during the Games and it attracted nearly 40,000 unique viewers from 105 nations.
2006	IPC's revenue exceeded EUR 5 million for the first time.
2007	A newIPC Classification Code and International Standards approved at IPC General Assembly meeting held in November.
2008	6–17 September – Beijing 2008 Paralympic Games – 3,951 from 146 countries; 472 events in 20 sports. Rowing was added to the program. 3.8 billion people throughout the world viewed the Games on television and streaming. and 3.4 million spectators attended the Games.
2009	IPC General Assembly reinstated athletes with an intellectual disability into the Paralympic Games.
2009	IPC Position Stand – Background and Scientific Principles of Classification in Paralympic Sport passed by IPC Sports Science Committee, Classification Committee and Governing Board in June.
2010	12–21 March – Vancouver 2010 Paralympic Winter Games – 502 athletes from 44 countries; 64 events in 5 sports. 230,000 ticket sales, a record at the time for the Games.
2012	29 August – 9 September – London 2012 Paralympic Games – 4,237 athletes from 164 countries; 503 events in 20 sports. Athletes with an intellectual disability return to the Games by competing in athletics, swimming and table tennis.
2012	IPC and IOC signed a new co-operation agreement which increased IOC financial support and guaranteed the Paralympics will be staged in the same city and venues as the Olympics until 2020.
2012	IPC's revenue exceeded EUR 10 million for the first time.
2012	IPC launched the Agitos Foundation.
2014	7–16 March – Sochi 2014 Paralympic Winter Games – 541 athletes from 45 countries; 72 events in 6 sports. Para snowboard added to the program. 316,200 ticket sales sold, surpassing the previous record from Vancouver 2010.
2016	7 August - The IPC suspended the Russian Paralympic Committee due to its inability to fulfil its membership responsibilities, in particular in relation to compliance with the IPC Anti-Doping Code and World Anti-Doping Code. This followed publication of the McLaren Report into Russian doping practicies around Sochi 2014. The decision meant Russia could not send athletes to the Rio 2016 Paralympic Games in any capacity.
2016	7–18 September – Rio 2016 Paralympic Games. The first games in Latin America and South America Para canoe and Para triathlon added to the program. 30 November – IPC officially rebrands the 10 sports for which it serves as the international federation with the "World Para" mark. At the same time, IPC changes the names of three of these 10 sports: Paralympic shooting becomes "shooting Para sport".; Sledge hockey becomes "Para ice hockey".; Wheelchair dance sport becomes "Para dance sport".
2017	Philip Craven was succeeded by the Brazilian Andrew Parsons as IPC President after serving four terms.
2018	9–18 March – PyeongChang 2018 Paralympic Winter Games – 564 athletes from 49 countries; 80 events in 6 sports, Para snowboard was expanded into a separate discipline for 2018, with 10 medal events (in 2014, two medal events in snowboarding were held within the alpine skiing programme). A then record 20 countries won medals, and a record 343,000 tickets were sold. IOC and IPC, signed an agreement that renewed the partnership between the two institutions by Brisbane 2032.
2019	15 March - Following its suspension for doping in 2016, the IPC reinstated the membership of the Russian Paralympic Committee having met 69 of the original 70 reinstatement criteria.
2019	11 October - Dr Mike Peters PLY, a two-time Paralympian in CP Football was appointed IPC Chief Executive Officer.
2019	New "Change Starts with Sport" motto introduced highlighting the transformational impact of the Paralympic Movement.
2021	24 August - 5 September - Tokyo 2020 Paralympic Games – Delayed by one year due to the COVID-19 Pandemic. The first (and only) Paralympic Games to be held in an odd-numbered year, the first Summer Paralympics with no outside spectators and the first Summer Paralympics to be held in a non-leap year. 4,403 athletes from 162 nations with 539 events across 22 sports. Para badminton and Para taekwondo both made their Paralympic debut.
2022	4 - 13 March Beijing 2022 Paralympic Winter Games. First city to host both the Summer & Winter Paralympics. First Winter Paralympics to not have outside spectators due to COVID-19 restrictions. 558 Athletes from 46 nations with 78 events across 6 sports. Following major threats of boycott, the IPC declined athlete entries from Russia and Belarus due to the Russian invasion of Ukraine.
2022	1 September - following its approval at the 2021 IPC General Assembly, a new IPC Constitution came into effect. The Constitution was overwhelmingly approved by IPC members following a two-year consultation exercise.
2024	22 April The IPC moved to new headquarters in Bonn, Germany. Following five years of extensive renovations and investment from the State Government of North Rhine-Westphalia that made the site one of the most accessible office spaces in Germany, Team IPC moved into Dahlmannstrasse 2, the former State Representation building.
2024	17 May - Following months of consultation, IPC members at an Extraordinary General Assembly approved the new 2025 IPC Classification Code. The new Codes promises better classification for athletes and a continued growth in the confidence and integrity of classification and Para sport competition.
2024	28 August - 8 September - Paris 2024 Paralympic Games – First time the city hosted the Summer Paralympics. 4,433 athletes from 170 nations with 549 events across 22 sports. 2.5 million tickets sold, making these the second biggest Games in terms of ticket sold behind London 2012.
2025	26-27 September - At the IPC General Assembly in Seoul, South Korea, Andrew Parsons was re-elected President for his third and final term. IPC member organisations also voted to not maintain the partial suspensions of NPC Russia and NPC Belarus, paving the way for them to compete at future Paralympic Games under their respective flags and anthems.
2026	6 - 15 March. Milano Cortina 2026 Paralympic Winter Games. Celebrating the 50th anniversary of the Winter Paralympics. A record 611 athletes from 55 nations competed across 79 events and six sports. China topped the medals table, and 27 NPCs won medals, the most ever at a single Winter Paralympics.
2028	15–27 August Los Angeles 2028 Paralympic Games an expected 4,480 athletes with 560 events across 23 sports. Para climbing will make its Paralympic debut after it was chosen for inclusion by the LA28 Organising Committee and approved by the IPC Governing Board.
2030	1 - 10 March - French Alps 2030 Paralympic Winter Games
2032	24 August - 5 September - Brisbane 2032 Paralympic Games
2034	10 - 19 March - Utah 2034 Paralympic Winter Games

== Publications ==
Each year the IPC publishes its Annual Report and every four years its Strategic Plan following consultation with IPC members.

Across social media, the IPC maintains several accounts under the @Paralympics banner including Instagram, TikTok, Facebook and Twitter.

== Paralympic Hall of Fame ==
Until 2016, the IPC inducted former Para athletes into the Hall of Fame in recognition of their sporting achievements.

- 2006: Jouko Grip (Finland) , Ulla Renvall (Sweden) , Annemie Schneider (Germany)
- 2008: Connie Hansen (Denmark) , Claudia Hengst (Germany) , Peter Homann (Australia) , André Viger (Canada) , Kevin McIntosh (coach) (Australia)
- 2010: Tanja Kari (Finland) , Chris Waddell (United States) , Rolf Hettich (coach) (Germany)
- 2012: Louise Sauvage (Australia) , Trischa Zorn-Hudson (United States) , Roberto Marson (Italy) , Frank Ponta (Australia) , Chris Holmes (United Kingdom)
- 2014: Jon Kreamelmeyer (United States) , Eric Villalon Fuentes (Spain) , Verena Bentele (Germany)
- 2016: Junichi Kawai (Japan) , Chantal Petitclerc (Canada) , Franz Nietlispach (Switzerland) , Neroli Fairhall (New Zealand) , Martin Morse (United States)

== Organising the Paralympic Games ==
=== The Organizing Committees ===
In June 2001, the International Olympic Committee (IOC) and the International Paralympic Committee (IPC) signed an agreement that would ensure that the staging of the Paralympic Games is automatically included in the bids for the Olympic Games starting during the process to choose the 2008 Summer Olympics host city.

However, the first city to held the Olympics and the Paralympics with the same committee was Barcelona in 1992.But,after the incidents who leds the caotic organization of the 1996 Summer Paralympics,the Salt Lake 2002 Organizing Committee (SLOC), chose to implement the practice of "one bid,two events, one city" during their winning bid for the 2002 Winter Olympics. Athens and Turin also originally made these same proposals for the 2004 Summer Games and for the 2006 Winter Games.However, both faced very serious problems in the organization of their editions.

The agreement was adjusted in 2003. An extension was signed in June 2006. A further extension was signed in 2012, valid until 2020. In March 2018, a historic long-term extension was signed establishing a partnership until 2032.

== IPC members ==
As of 1 January 2026, the IPC has 213 members made up of 187 National Paralympic Committees, 3 International Organisations of Sport for the Disabled, 5 regions and 18 International Federations.

=== National Paralympic Committees (NPCs) ===
NPCs are a national organisation recognised by the IPC as the sole representative of the Paralympic Movement in the NPC's country or territory. As of 8 August 2026, there are 187 NPCs within the Paralympic Movement with the two most recent additions being NPCs from Bolivia and South Sudan in September 2025.

=== International Organisations of Sport for the Disabled (IOSDs) ===
IOSDs are international organisations recognised by the IPC as the sole worldwide representative of a specific disability group. The organisations are World Abilitysport, Virtus and International Blind Sport Federation (IBSA).

=== Regional Organisations ===
There are five regional organisations recognised by the IPC as the sole representative of IPC Members located within a specific region. The five are: African Paralympic Committee (AfPC), Americas Paralympic Committee (AmPC), Asian Paralympic Committee (AsPC), European Paralympic Committee (EPC), and Oceania Paralympic Committee (OPC)

=== International Sports Federations (IFs) ===
An international sport federation is recognised by the IPC as the sole worldwide representative of a specific Para sport on the Paralympic Games sport programme.

There are 18 international federations recognized by the IPC with the International Federation of Sport Climbing (IFSC) most recently approved as an IPC member in September 2025. The 18 are as follows:

1. Badminton World Federation (BWF)
2. Federation Equestre Internationale (FEI)
3. International Biathlon Union (IBU)
4. International Canoe Federation (ICF)
5. International Federation of Sport Climbing (IFSC)
6. International Ski and Snowboard Federation (FIS)
7. International Table Tennis Federation (ITTF)
8. International Tennis Federation (ITF)
9. International Wheelchair Basketball Federation (IWBF)
10. Union Cycliste Internationale (UCI)
11. World Archery
12. World Boccia
13. World Curling
14. World ParaVolley
15. World Rowing
16. World Taekwondo (WT)
17. World Triathlon
18. World Wheelchair Rugby

== World Para Sports ==
The IPC has served as the international federation for multiple sports. As of January 2026, the IPC governs Para athletics, Para ice hockey, Para powerlifting, Para swimming and shooting Para sport.

On 30 November 2016, the IPC adopted the new blanket branding World Para Sports for its sub-committees, as part of an effort to give their governance and associated world championships a brand identity separate from that of the Paralympic Games. For branding and linguistic reasons, the IPC also renamed Paralympic shooting to "shooting Para sport" (to reduce confusion with parachuting), and sledge hockey to "Para ice hockey". Sports contested in the Summer Paralympics began using the new branding immediately. For winter sports, whose competitive seasons had already started by the announcement, only the world championships were immediately changed to reflect the new branding; the full switchover did not occur until the 2017–18 season.

In December 2021 during its General Assembly, the IPC voted on an aspirational mandate to transfer its international governance of Para sports to independent bodies by 2026, either by transferring them to an existing governing body, or spinning off subcommittees as independent federations. A governance review published in October 2019 found that the IPC's governance "created perceptions of conflict of interest, disparity in the application of resources, a sense of unfairness between the IPC Sports and those which are not and confusion about the IPC's role, all of which is impacting its reputation."

In July 2022, the IPC transferred governance of Paralympic alpine skiing, snowboard, cross-country skiing and biathlon to the International Ski and Snowboard Federation (FIS) and International Biathlon Union (IBU) respectively, unifying their governance with their Olympic counterparts. In June 2023, the IPC appointed the British Paralympic Association and UK Sport to assist in spinning off World Para Athletics and World Para Swimming as independent federations that would be based in Manchester. Para dance sport was transferred to World Abilitysport (formerly IWAS) in 2024. In April 2026, the IPC announced that, subject to ratification at the International Shooting Sport Federation (ISSF) General Assembly in late 2026, ISSF would assume responsibility for the entire governance, management and administration of shooting Para sport from early 2027.

=== World Para Athletics ===
Supervises and co-ordinates the World Para Athletics Championships, regional Championships and other competitions.

- Official website: WorldParaAthletics.org (Paralympic.org/athletics)
- Sport name: Para athletics
- Former sport committee name: IPC Athletics

=== World Para Ice Hockey ===
Supervises and co-ordinates the World Para Ice Hockey Championships and other competitions. With the November 2016 rebranding, the official name of the sport was changed from "sledge hockey" to "Para ice hockey". This change was made upon the request of the sport's community, partly due to the word "sledge" having different meanings across languages.

- Official website: WorldParaIceHockey.org (Paralympic.org/ice-hockey)
- Sport name: Para ice hockey
- Former sport committee name: IPC Ice Sledge Hockey

=== World Para Powerlifting ===
Supervises and co-ordinates the World Para Powerlifting Championships and other competitions.

- Official website: WorldParaPowerlifting.org (Paralympic.org/powerlifting)
- Sport name: Para powerlifting
- Former sport committee name: IPC Powerlifting

=== World Shooting Para Sport ===
Supervises and co-ordinates the World Shooting Para Sport Championships and other competitions. The rebranding saw the sport renamed as "shooting Para sport" to avoid possible confusion with parachuting.

- Official website: WorldShootingParaSport.org (Paralympic.org/shooting)
- Sport name: Shooting Para sport
- Former sport committee name: IPC Shooting

=== World Para Swimming ===
Supervises and co-ordinates the World Para Swimming Championships and other competitions.

- Official website: WorldParaSwimming.org (Paralympic.org/swimming)
- Sport name: Para swimming
- Former sport committee name: IPC Swimming

== Recognized Federations ==
The list of 15 International Federations recognized by the IPC in 2025, but who are not IPC members, is as follows:

1. International Federation of Power Wheelchair Football (FIPFA)
2. International Bobsleigh and Skeleton Federation (IBSF)
3. International Bowling Federation (IBF)
4. International Federation of CP Football (IFCP)
5. International Golf Federation (IGF)
6. International Handball Federation (IHF)
7. International Hockey Federation (FIH)
8. International Sambo Federation (FIAS)
9. International Surfing Federation (ISF)
10. Union Internationale de Pentathlon Moderne (UIPM)
11. World Armwrestling Federation (WAF)
12. World Bowls (WB)
13. World Flying Disc Federation (WFDF)
14. World Karate Federation (WKF)
15. World Sailing (WS)

== Worldwide Paralympic Partner programme ==
The worldwide Paralympic Partner sponsorship programme includes the following commercial sponsors of the Paralympic Games.

- ABInBev
- Airbnb
- Alibaba Group
- Allianz
- Coca-Cola / Mengniu
- Deloitte
- OMEGA
- Ottobock
- P&G
- Samsung
- TCL
- Visa

== See also ==
- Cheating at the Paralympic Games
- Disabled sports
