= Wheelchair racing at the 1996 Summer Olympics =

Wheelchair racing at the 1996 Summer Olympics featured as a demonstration event within the athletics programme on 1 August 1996. There were two events, an 800 m race for women and a 1500 m race for men.

== Men's 1500 m wheelchair ==
Rank	Name	Nationality	Time	Notes
1st place, gold medalist(s)	Claude Issorat	France	3:15.18	
2nd place, silver medalist(s)	Scot Hollonbeck	United States	3:15.30	
3rd place, bronze medalist(s)	Franz Nietlispach	Switzerland	3:16.41	
4	Philippe Couprie	France	3:16.45	
5	Saúl Mendoza	Mexico	3:16.58	
6	Jorge Luna	Mexico	3:16.78	
7	Paul Wiggins	Australia	3:16.86	
8	Jacob Heilveil	United States	3:16.90	

== Women's 800 m wheelchair ==
Rank	Name	Nationality	Time	Notes
1st place, gold medalist(s)	Louise Sauvage	Australia	1:54.90	
2nd place, silver medalist(s)	Jean Driscoll	United States	1:55.19	
3rd place, bronze medalist(s)	Cheri Becerra	United States	1:55.49	
4	Tanni Grey	Great Britain	1:55.55	
5	Chantal Petitclerc	Canada	1:55.61	
6	Leann Shannon	United States	1:55.82	
7	Monica Wetterström	Sweden	1:56.83	
8	Lily Anggreny	Germany	2:05.33	

== See also ==
- Athletics at the 1996 Summer Paralympics
