= Debra Alexander =

South African psychologist

- Born: 16 March 1958 (age 67)
- Education: 2015: Postgraduate Certification in Mindfulness Based Interventions (SU) 2009: PhD in Neuropsychology/Sport (UWC) 2002: MSoc Sc in Clinical Psychology (Rhodes University) 1998:BSoc Sc (Hons) Degree (distinction) (UCT) 1997: BSoc Sc Degree (distinction in Psychology & Xhosa II) (UCT) 1987: Post Graduate Diploma for Educators of Adults – (UCT) 1983: Midwifery Diploma (distinction) – (Carinus Nursing College/Mowbray Maternity Hospital) 1979: General Nursing Diploma (distinction) – (Carinus Nursing College)
- Occupation: clinical psychologist
- Board member of: International Paralympic Committee (IPC), Governing Board Member (2017 – current) World Triathlon (WT), Executive Board Member (2012 -current) African Triathlon Union (ATU), 1st Vice President (2016 - current)

Debra Geraldine Alexander (born 16 March 1958), is a South African clinical psychologist and a lecturer in psychiatry at the University of Stellenbosch in South Arica. She is also active in sports governance and administration in the fields of international parasports and triathlon.

== Career ==
Alexander entered the health care profession in 1979 as a nurse and midwife. Subsequently she completed an Advanced Diploma in Adult Education, and in the 1990s she completed both a bachelor’s degree and an honour’s degree in Social Science, followed by a master’s degree in Clinical Psychology. She completed her doctorate in Neuropsychology/Sport in 2009 with a focus on concussion in rugby, and later completed a postgraduate certificate in Mindfulness-Based Interventions.

Alexander has held senior academic positions in the Psychiatry Department, Stellenbosch University, as Head of the Clinical Psychology Department at Tygerberg Hospital, as Principal Clinical Psychologist and as Senior Lecturer.

== Triathlon Leadership ==
Alexander has been involved with triathlon since 2004 and has been part of the national leadership team in South Africa since 2006. She is the past president of the Triathlon South Africa (TSA) National Federation.

Alexander is the current 1st Vice President 2020-2024 of World Triathlon (WT), and previously served on the WT Executive Board from 2012-2020. During her time on the Executive Board of WT, Alexander focused on promoting World Paratriathlon Events on all continents, as well as the delivery of paratriathlon at the Rio 2016 Paralympic Games.

She is also the 2nd Vice President 2020-2024 of the South African Olympic and Paralympic Committee (SASCOC) and 1st Vice President of the Africa Triathlon (AT). In addition, she serves on the Executive Board of African Triathlon Union (ATU) and is the past president of Triathlon South Africa (TSA).

During her tenure at World Triathlon (WT) her portfolios included the WT Paratriathlon Committee, Technical Committee, Coaches Committee and Medical Committee. She has represented World Triathlon at major events, on competition juries including the Rio Olympic Games, conferences and meetings such as the Association of Paralympic Sports Organizations (APSO) and the Association of Summer Olympic International Federations (ASOIF) Consultative Group on Para Sport.

Alexander was elected to the International Paralympic Committee Governing Board in 2017. She attended the PyeongChang 2018 Paralympic Winter Games where she served on the Whang Youn Dai Achievement Award selection panel. She has represented the IPC at the Vista Conference, the Africa Continental Organisational Capacity Program for National Paralympic Committees and co-facilitated the Africa Women in Leadership workshops. She currently chairs the Science and Research Working Group and is a member of the Safeguarding Working Group.

== Achievements and awards ==
- African Triathlon Union Award – Recognition of Contribution to Triathlon (2014, 2016, 2018)
- Winner of South African Sports Award (Category Federation of the Year) 2014
- Winner of the CEO’s Most Influential Woman in Business and Government Award (Category Sport) 2012
- Nomination for South African Sports Awards (Category Administration) (2013, 2015)
- Finalist in South African Sports Awards (Category Administration) 2012
- Protea Colors (South African Elite Triathlon Team Management) 2012, 2013
