= Wheelchair racing at the 2000 Summer Olympics =

Wheelchair racing at the 2000 Summer Olympics featured as a demonstration event within the athletics programme on 28 September 2000. There were two events, an 800 m race for women and a 1500 m race for men. Medals were not awarded, as the sport was not part of the official competition.

== Men's 1500 m wheelchair ==
Rank	Name	Nationality	Time	Notes
1st place, gold medalist(s)	Saúl Mendoza	Mexico	3:06.75	OR
2nd place, silver medalist(s)	Claude Issorat	France	3:07.65	
3rd place, bronze medalist(s)	Heinz Frei	Switzerland	3:07.82	
4	Kurt Fearnley	Australia	3:08.27	
5	Jeff Adams	Canada	3:08.95	
6	Scot Hollonbeck	United States	3:09.15	
7	Ernst van Dyk	South Africa	3:12.35	
8	John Maclean	Australia	—	DNF

== Women's 800 m wheelchair ==
Rank	Name	Nationality	Time	Notes
1st place, gold medalist(s)	Louise Sauvage	Australia	1:56.07	
2nd place, silver medalist(s)	Wakako Tsuchida	Japan	1:56.49	
3rd place, bronze medalist(s)	Ariadne Hernández	Mexico	1:56.59	
4	Tanni Grey	Great Britain	1:56.86	
5	Cheri Becerra	United States	1:57.19	
6	Chantal Petitclerc	Canada	1:57.22	
7	Lily Anggreny	Germany	1:57.63	
8	Madeleine Nordlund	Sweden	1:57.82	

== See also ==
- Athletics at the 2000 Summer Paralympics
