= Athletics at the 2004 Summer Paralympics – Men's 4 × 100 metre relay T53–T54 =

Men's 4x100m T53-54 at the XII Paralympic Games
- Venue: Athens Olympic Stadium
- Dates: 27 September 2004
- Competitors: 9
- Winning time: 51.99

Medalists
1st place, gold medalist(s)		Pichet Krungget; Rawat Tana; Supachai Koysub; Prawat Wahorum	Thailand
2nd place, silver medalist(s)		Richard Colman; Richard Nicholson; Kurt Fearnley; Geoff Trappett	Australia
3rd place, bronze medalist(s)		Ludovic Gapenne; Pierre Fairbank; Claude Issorat; Hubert Locco	France

The Men's 4x100m relay T53-54 for wheelchair athletes at the 2004 Summer Paralympics were held in the Athens Olympic Stadium on 27 September. The event consisted of 3 heats and a final, and was won by the team representing Thailand.

== 1st round ==
Qualified for next round

Heat 1

27 Sept. 2004, 10:05

Rank	Team	Time	Notes
1	Australia	53.51	Q
2	Switzerland	54.75	
3	Mexico	55.30	

Heat 2

27 Sept. 2004, 10:15

Rank	Team	Time	Notes
1	Thailand	51.98	WR Q
2	Canada	53.95	q
3	Germany	54.45	

Heat 3

27 Sept. 2004, 10:30

Rank	Team	Time	Notes
1	France	53.24	Q
	China	DNS	
	United States	DNS	

== Final round ==
27 Sept. 2004, 21:35

Rank	Team	Time	Notes
1st place, gold medalist(s)	Thailand	51.99	
2nd place, silver medalist(s)	Australia	52.10	
3rd place, bronze medalist(s)	France	53.36	
4	Canada	54.10	

== Team Lists ==
Thailand; Pichet Krungget; Rawat Tana; Supachai Koysub; Prawat Wahorum	France; Ludovic Gapenne; Pierre Fairbank; Claude Issorat; Hubert Locco	Australia; Richard Colman; Richard Nicholson; Kurt Fearnley; Geoff Trappett	Canada; Daniel Normandin; Brent Lakatos; Eric Gauthier; Curtis Thom
Germany; Reinhard Berner; Sebastian Cleem; Robert Figl; Alhassane Balde	Switzerland; Bojan Mitic; Edison Kasumaj; Tobias Loetscher; Marcel Hug	Mexico; Fernando Sanchez; Jaime Ramirez; Freddy Sandoval; Gonzalo Valdovinos	China; Liu Wei; Zhao Ji; Zhang Li Xin; Li Jun
United States; Adam Bleakney; Tyler Byers; Joshua George; Jacob Heilveil; Scot Hollonbeck
