= Paralympic Hall of Fame =

Hall of fame established by the International Paralympic Committee

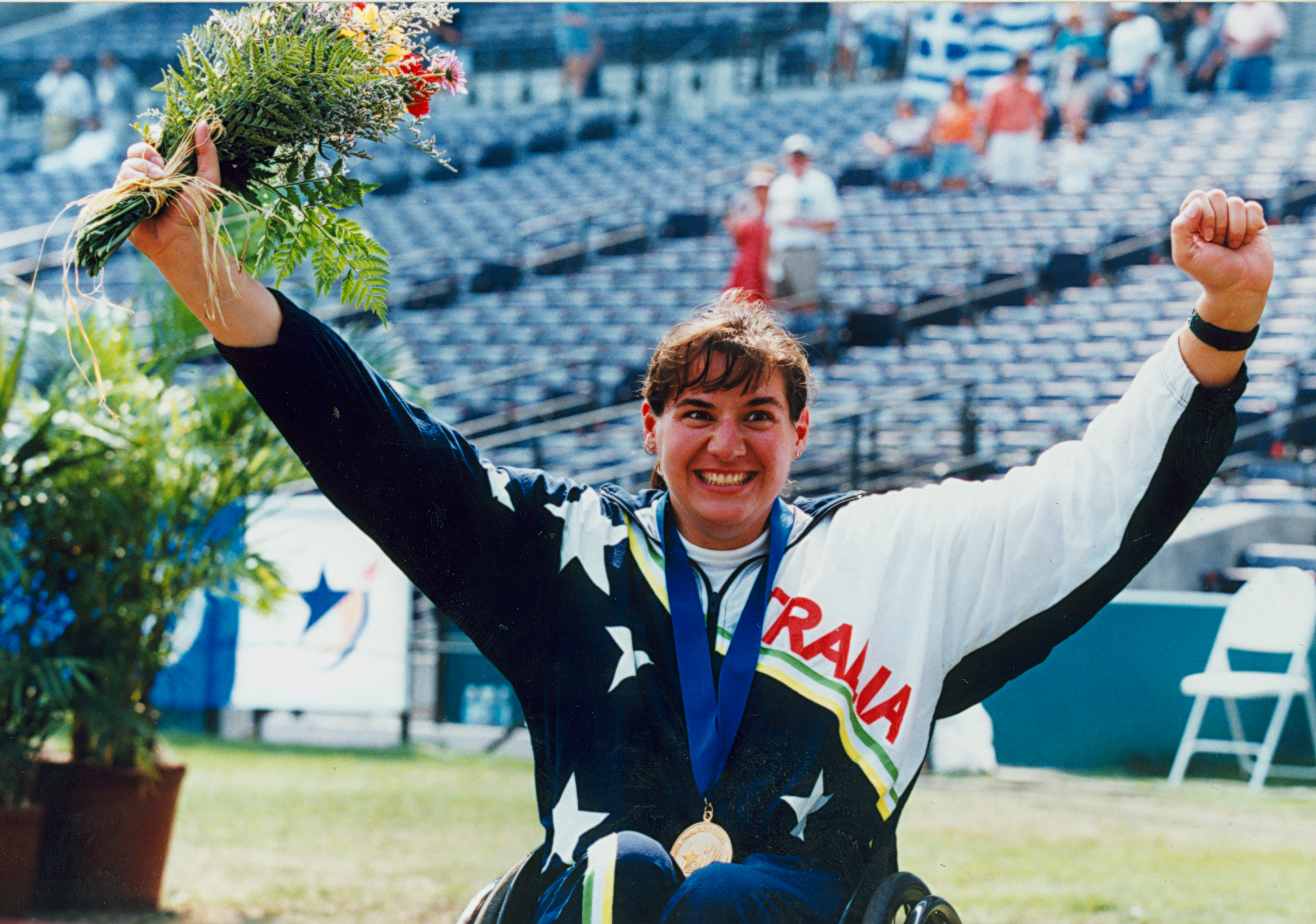
The aussie Louise Sauvage, one of two Australian members of the 2012 Paralympic Hall of Fame induction.

The Visa Paralympic Hall of Fame is a hall of fame which was established by the International Paralympic Committee.

On 30 August 2012, five paralympic athletes were inducted into the fourth Visa Paralympic Hall of Fame in a ceremony in London.

== Criteria ==
Every two years, the prize is awarded to personalities Paralympic who have made outstanding contributions to success on and fair play, from the third edition of the award is sponsored by VISA.

== Members ==
2006

- (Finland) Jouko Grip
- (Sweden) Ulla Renvall (coach)
- (Germany) Annemie Schneider

2008

- (Denmark) Connie Hansen
- (Germany) Claudia Hengst
- (Australia) Peter Homann
- (Canada) André Viger
- (Australia) Kevin McIntosh (coach)

2010

- (Finland) Tanja Kari
- (United States) Chris Waddell
- (Germany) Rolf Hettich (coach)

2012

- (Australia) Louise Sauvage
- (United States) Trischa Zorn
- (Italy) Roberto Marson
- (Australia) Frank Ponta
- (United Kingdom) Chris Holmes

2014

- (United States) Jon Kreamelmeyer
- (Spain) Eric Villalon Fuentes
- (Germany) Verena Bentele

2016

- (Japan) Junichi Kawai
- (Canada) Chantal Petitclerc
- (Switzerland) Franz Nietlispach
- (New Zealand) Neroli Fairhall
- (United States) Martin Morse

== Gallery ==
2012 Visa Paralympic Hall of Fame induction

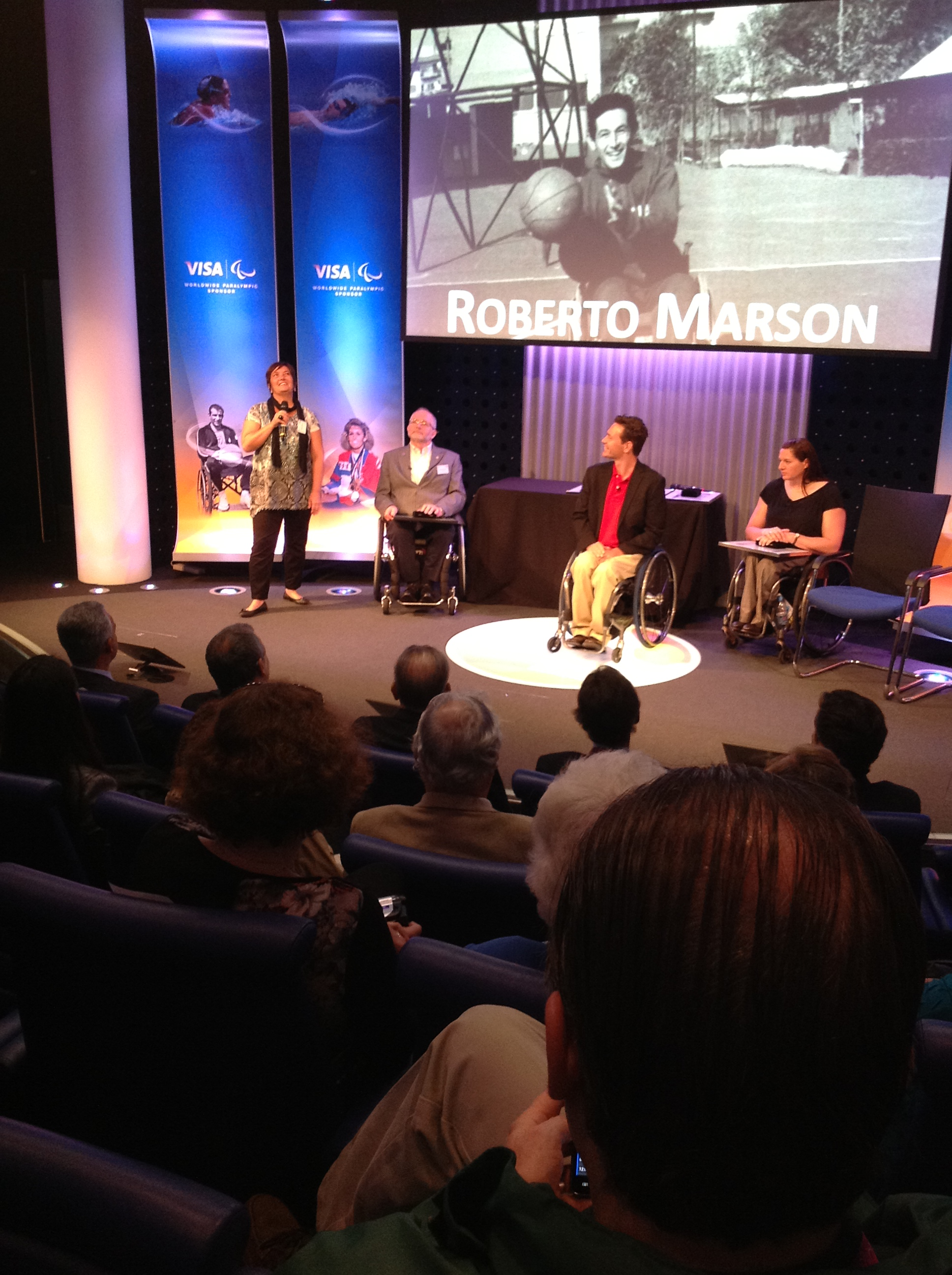
Roberto Marson awarding

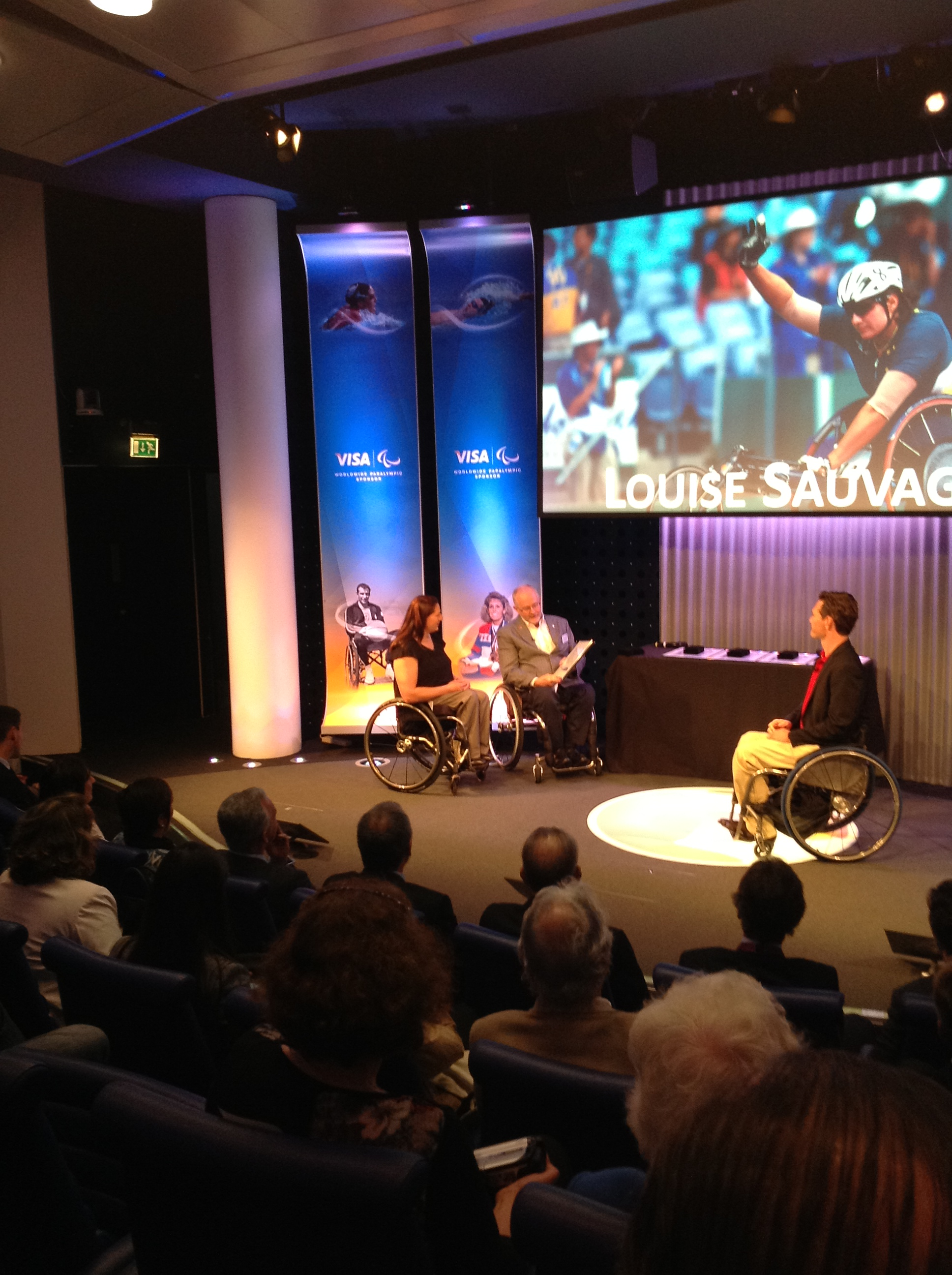
Louise Sauvage awarding

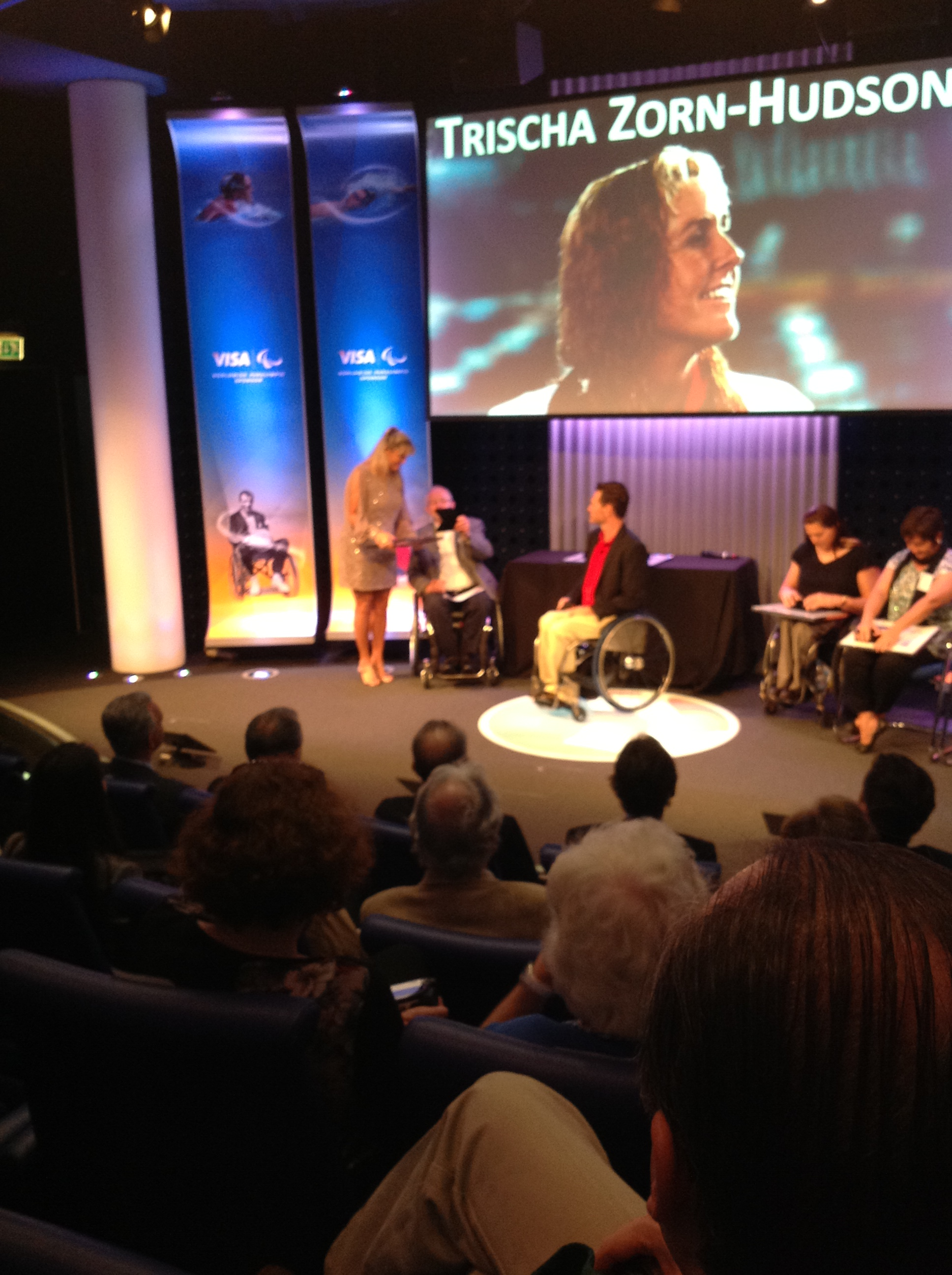
Trischa Zorn awarding

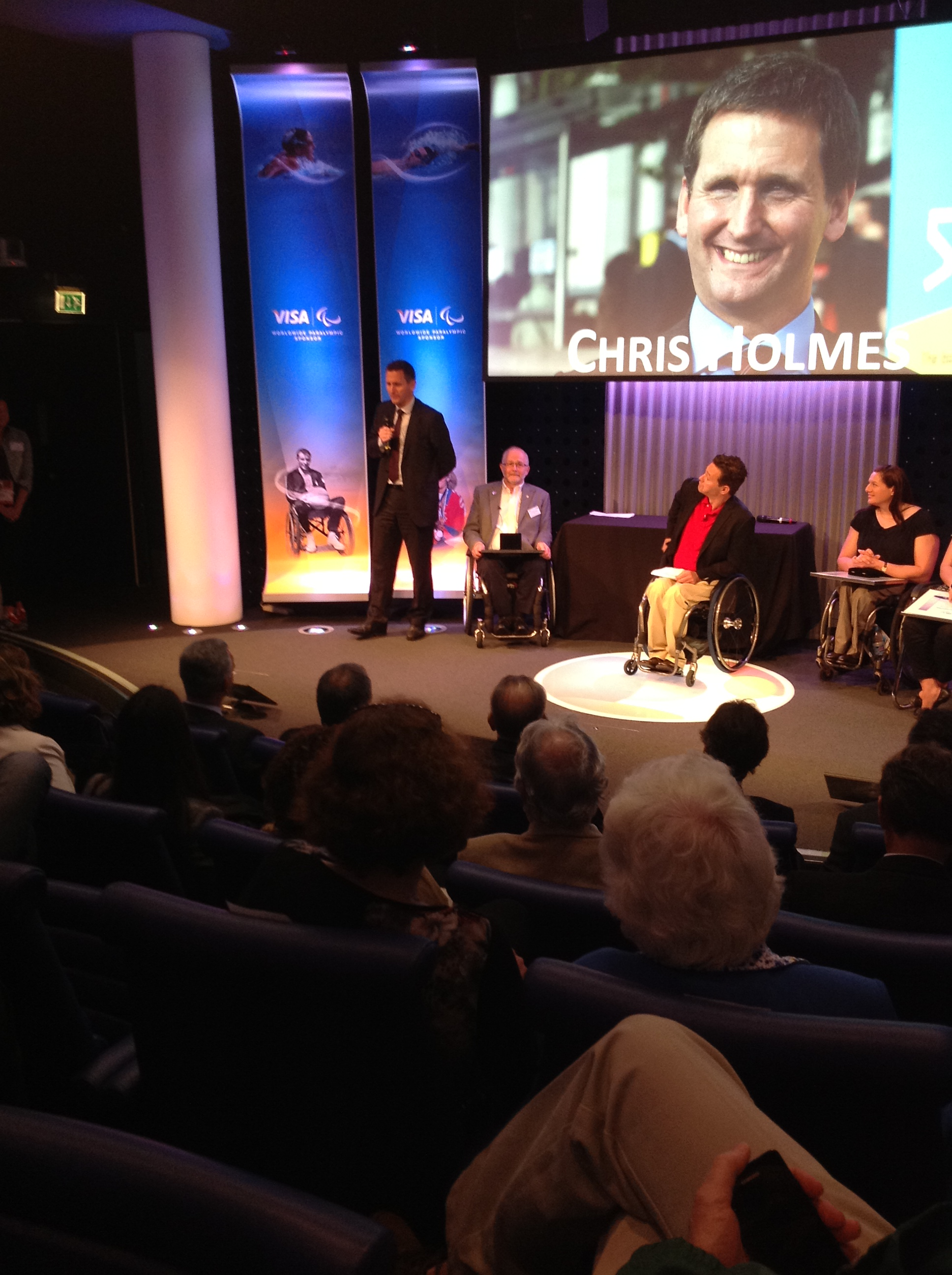
Chris Holmes awarding

== See also ==
- Paralympic Games
- List of multiple Paralympic gold medalists
- Frank Ponta inducted into the Paralympic Hall of Fame
- IPC inducts new members into its Hall of Fame
