= Jenni Banks =

Australian athletics coach

Jennifer Patricia Banks is an Australian athletics coach specialising with Paralympic wheelchair athletes.

She was born in Perth, Western Australia. She has completed a Masters in Education at the University of Western Australia where her thesis was titled 'Psychological factors in sports injuries among elite hockey players'.

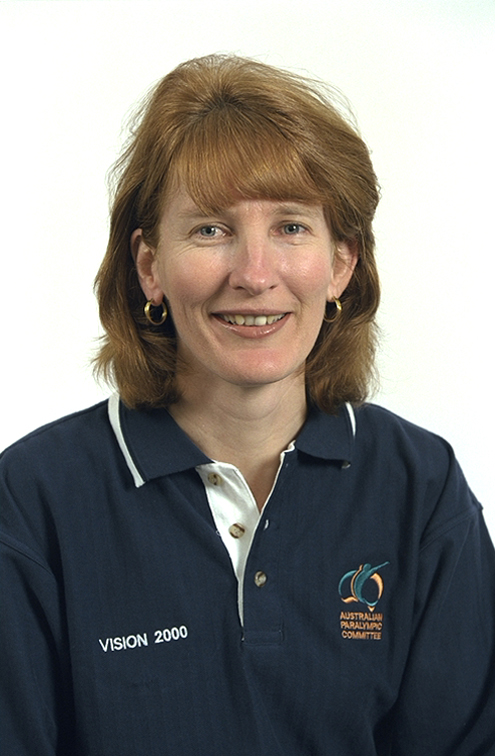
Jenni Banks' Australian team portrait for the 2000 summer Paralympics.

In her early sporting career, Banks was a field hockey goalkeeper and she represented Western Australia and Australia. She retired due to a serious knee injury just after she started representing Australia. In 1991 she was an Australian Institute of Sport Satellite Coach in Perth where she coached Louise Sauvage and Paul Wiggins, amongst others (including Fabian Blattman and Greg Smith) . Banks oversaw much of Sauvage's development as an elite wheelchair athlete, from her first international success to her best ever medal tally at the Olympic and Paralympic Games in Atlanta in 1996. She was an athletics coach on the Australian team at the 1994 Commonwealth Games. Banks worked as the Director of Sport and High Performance Manager for the Australian Paralympic Committee (APC) from 1994 to 2003. During this period, Australia finished second on the medal tally at the Atlanta Summer Paralympics (after finishing seventhon the medal tally at the 1992 Barcelona Summer Paralympics), first on the medal table at the Sydney Summer Paralympics and 4th on the medal table the 2002 Salt Lake City Winter Paralympics. After leaving the APC in 2003, she established Creating Excellence Consulting that worked with many state, national and international sports organisations including the Australian Sports Commission/Australian Institute of Sport, Basketball Australia, Cycling Australia, Triathlon Australia, the International Triathlon Union and the Australian Sports Anti-Doping Authority. She contributed to coaching resources published by the Australian Sports Commission.

She coached British wheelchair racer Tanni Grey-Thompson to multiple Paralympic gold medals. Grey-Thompson commented that she would send "data including video clips and jpeg files with all my physiological details and Jenni's able to analyse them all, sending her comments and criticisms back via email".

In 2010, she was appointed as the part-time handcycling coach with Cycling Australia Paracycling High Performance Program and was a cycling coach on the Australian team at the 2012 London Paralympics. Banks moved to the United Kingdom in 2012 to take up a five-year contract as British Athletics Institute Coach for Wheelchair Racing. Whilst in this position she was responsible for all wheelchair racing aspects of the British Athletics World Class and Talent Development Programs and coached Hannah Cockroft to three gold medals at the 2016 Rio Paralympics and eight gold medals at three IPC Athletics World Championships. She also coached Richard Chiassaro, Toby Gold and Stephen Osborne during this time.

Since January 2018 she has worked as a Consultant Coach with British Athletics and is coaching British Paralympic athletes Hannah Cockroft and Richard Chiassaro as well as mentoring other athletes and personal coaches.

== Recognition ==
- 1994 – Australian Coaching Council Female Young Coach of the Year
- 2000 – Australian Sports Medal
- 2000 – Mussabini Medal
- 2016 – Medal of the Order of Australia (OAM) for service to sport, and to people with a disability
- Sports Coach UK's Coaching Hall of Fame
