= Ludovic Gapenne =

French Paralympic athlete

Medal record

Men's para athletics

Representing France

Paralympic Games
Bronze medal – third place	2004 Athens	4x100m - T53-54

Ludovic Gapenne is a Paralympian athlete from France competing mainly in category T54 sprint and middle-distance events.

Ludovic was a member of the bronze medal-winning French 4 × 100 m in the 53-54 class at the 2004 Summer Paralympics where he also competed in the 1500m and 400m.
