= Hubert Locco =

French Paralympic athlete

Medal record

Men's para athletics

Representing France

Paralympic Games
Bronze medal – third place	2004 Athens	4x100m - T53-54

Hubert Locco is a Paralympian athlete from France competing mainly in category T54 sprint events.

Hubert has competed in the 100m and 200m in the 1996 and 2004 Summer Paralympics, but it was when he teamed up with the French T53-54 4 × 100 m relay team in Athens that he won his only medal, a bronze.
