= Richard Nicholson (Paralympian) =

Australian Paralympic powerlifter and athlete

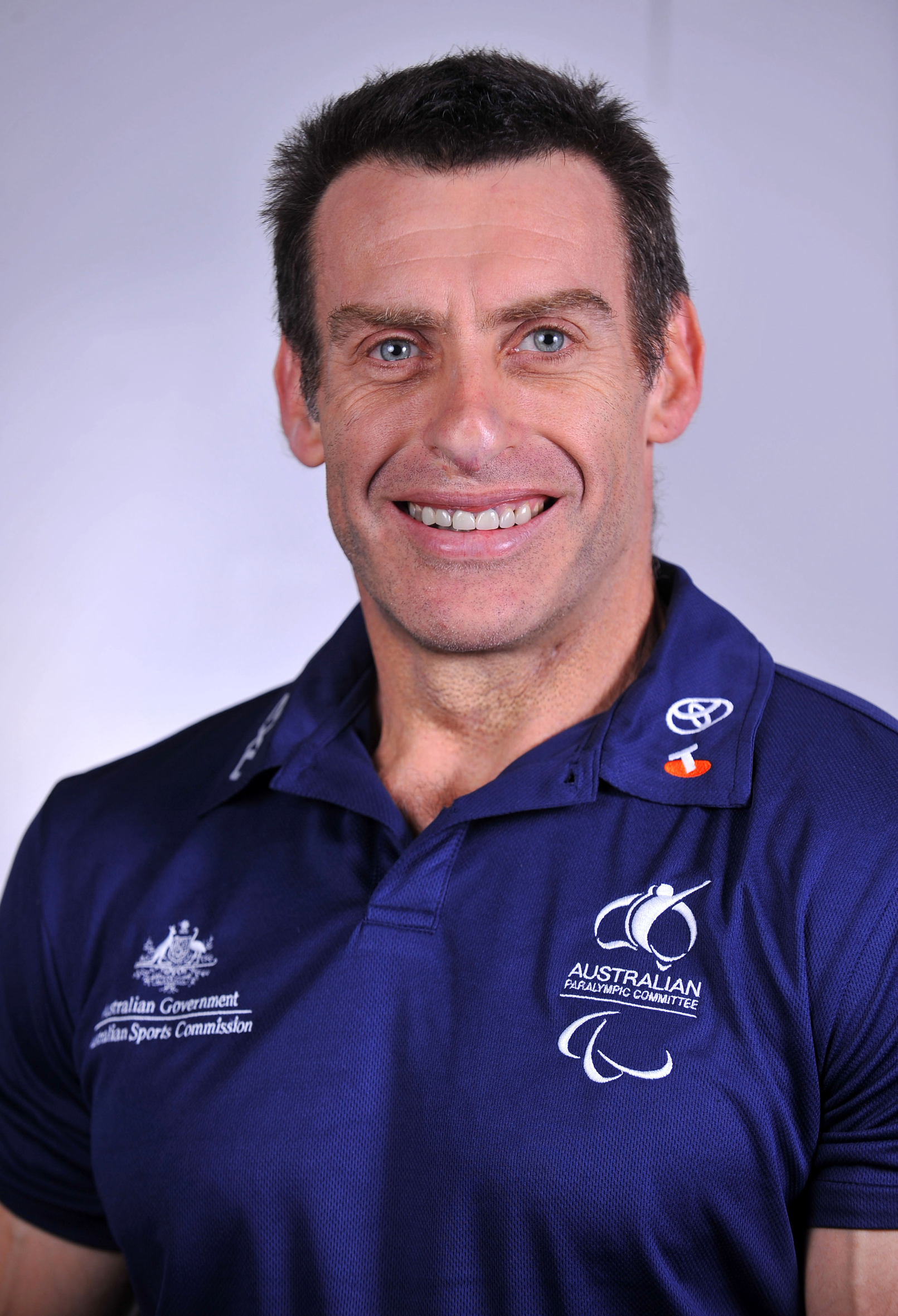
- 2012 Australian Paralympic team portrait of Nicholson

Personal information
- Nationality: Australia
- Born: 30 June 1970 (age 56) Sydney, New South Wales
Medal record
Men's powerlifting
Paralympic Games
Silver medal – second place	2000 Sydney	Up to 60 kg
Commonwealth Games
Silver medal – second place	2002 Manchester	Bench press
Men's athletics (T54)
Paralympic Games
Silver medal – second place	2004 Athens	4×100 m T53–54
Bronze medal – third place	2012 London	4×400 m relay – T53/54

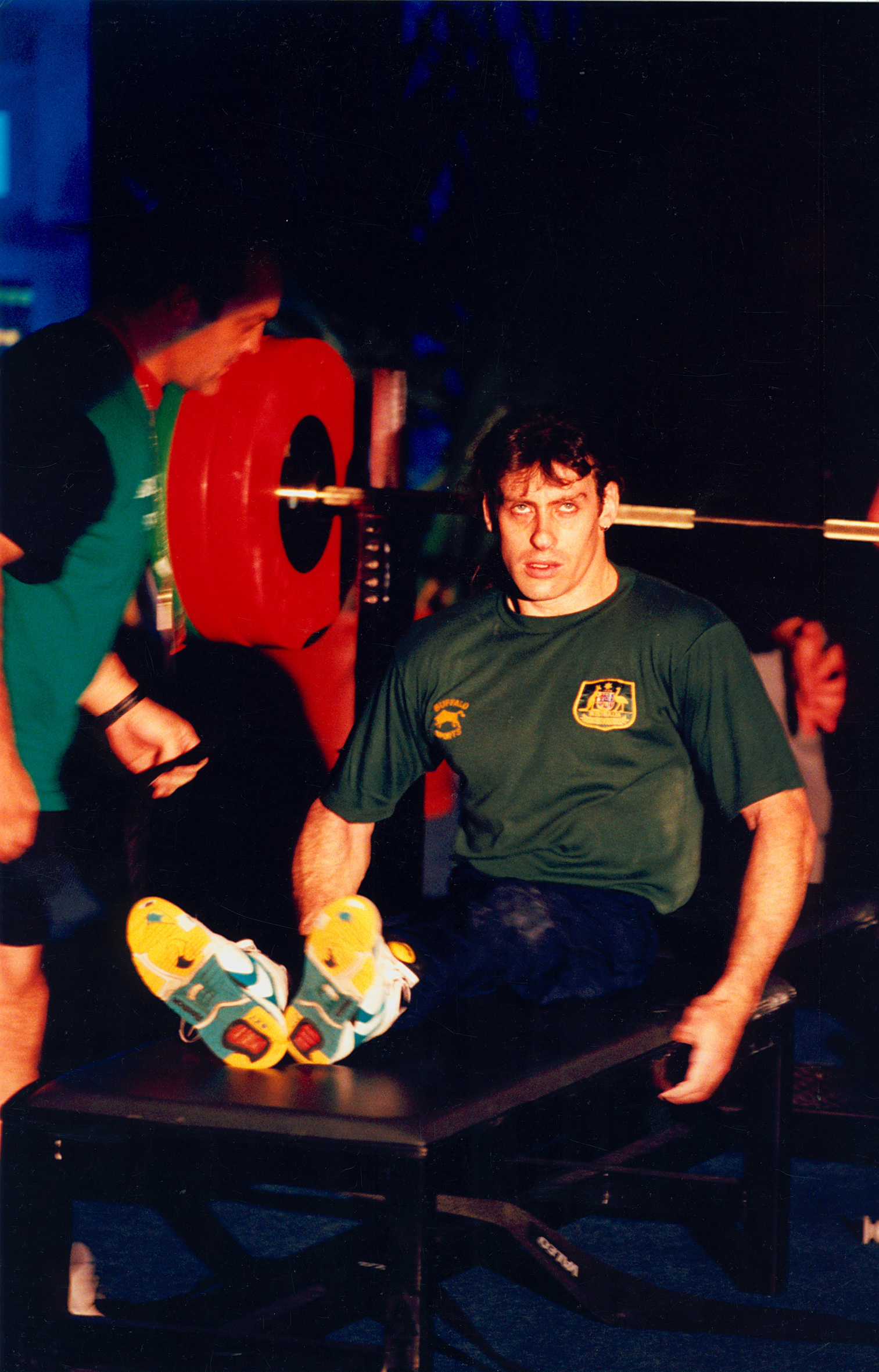
Richard Nicholson, Powerlifting Atlanta 1996

Richard Nicholson (born 30 June 1970) is an Australian Paralympic powerlifter and athlete. He has competed at five successive Paralympic Games from the 1996 to 2012 Summer Paralympics. At the 2000 Games, he won a silver medal in the powerlifting Men's Up to 60 kg event. In athletics, at the 2004 Athens Paralympics he won a silver medal in the Men's 4 × 100 m T53–54 event and at the 2012 London Paralympics a bronze medal in the Men's 4 × 400 m T53–54 event.

== Personal ==
Nicholson was born on 30 June 1970 in Sydney, New South Wales. At the age of four he became ill and subsequently lost the use of his legs. At the age of seven, he used a skateboard given to him by his parents to move around Canberra. As of 2015, he was working as a sports consultant at the Australian Sports Commission. In February 2016, it was announced that Nicholson was being appointed to being University of Canberra 's second Athlete in Residence. This position allows him the opportunity to share his experience with University of Canberra students.

== Powerlifting ==
Nicholson's first sporting activity was archery follow by gymnastics. Nicholson noted that gymnastics gave him a strong upper body and strong work ethic, particularly through the Roman rings. He then took up powerlifting where he competed at the 1996 Atlanta Games and finished eight in the 56 kg category. He went on to win a silver medal in the 60 kg category at the 2000 Sydney Games. He also won a silver medal in the bench press at the 2002 Manchester Commonwealth Games. He quit powerlifting because of the existence of doping. Ten powerlifters tested positive to drugs at the 2000 Sydney Paralympics.

== Athletics ==
=== Paralympic Games ===
After transferring to athletics, as a T54 athlete, he competed at the 2004 Athens Paralympics in five events and won a silver medal in the men's 4 × 100 m relay T53–54. He competed in four events at the 2008 Beijing Paralympics with his best placing being fourth in the men's 4 × 100 m relay T53–54. At the 2012 Summer Paralympics, Nicholson participated in the men's 100 m T54, 400 m T54 and the men's 4 × 400 m T53/54 – winning a bronze in the 4 × 400 m.

=== World Championships ===
At the 2006 IPC Athletics World Championships, he competed in five events at the 2011 World Championships ranging from 100m to the marathon but did not medal. At the 2013 World Championships, he competed in three events with his best result being fourth in the men's 4 × 400 m relay T53–54.

=== Commonwealth Games ===
He has competed in two Commonwealth Games, finishing fifth in the men's discus F55–56 in 2006 Games and seventh in the Men's 1500m T54 at the 2014 Games.

He regularly competes in major road races in Australia including the Oz Day 10K Wheelchair Road Race and Sydney's City to Surf where he won the Men's Wheelchair category in 2015. His main T54 competitor in Australia is Kurt Fearnley. He has been an ACT Academy of Sport scholarship holder for nearly 2 decades.

Inaugural inductee to University of Canberra Sport Walk of Fame in 2022.
