= Triathlon South Africa =

- Sport: Triathlon
- Jurisdiction: National
- Abbreviation: TSA
- Founded: 1984
- Affiliation: International Triathlon Union (ITU)
- Regional affiliation: African Triathlon Union
- Headquarters: 1st Floor, Loftus Versfeld, Kirkness Street, Pretoria, Tshwane, 0002
- President: Jan Sterk
- Secretary: Sharon Oakley

Official website
- www.triathlonsa.co.za
- (South Africa)

Triathlon South Africa is the Sport governing body for the sport of triathlon in South Africa. It is responsible for the management of sports such as duathlon, aquathlon and triathlon within South Africa. It is affiliated to International Triathlon Union (ITU), and the African Triathlon Union.

== History ==
Norrie Williamson together with Mike Hogg, Dave McCarney and Philip Kuhn competed in the UK for the ultra triathlon relay event (Enduroman), with Bruce Fordyce and Tim Noakes as their support team, winning the event, on the Champs-Élysées in Paris. The win received wide coverage in the local newspapers prompting the group to form the South African Triathlon Federation on their arrival.

The South African Triathlon Federation (what is now known as Triathlon South Africa) was founded with the support of Norrie Williamson in 1984, the name was changed to Triathlon South Africa in 1991.

== See also ==
ITU Triathlon World Championships
