= Jon Kreamelmeyer =

American cross-country skiing coach

Jon Kreamelmeyer (born 1947) is an American cross-country skiing coach and a member of the Paralympic Hall of Fame.

== Early life and career ==
Kreamelmeyer was born and raised in Colorado. He graduated from Dakota Wesleyan University with a degree in education and began teaching at Summit County High School in Frisco, Colorado, where he served as an assistant ski coach from 1977 until 1986 and the head ski coach until 1991.

From 1996 to 2002, Kreamelmeyer served on the Frisco Town Council and in 2003, he was elected to the Summit School District Board of Education. He remained on the board until 2011, serving terms as vice president and president. In 2012, he was recognised for his contributions to the community with a Frisco Finest award.

== Paralympics ==
At the 1992 Winter Paralympics, held in Tignes and Albertville, France, Kreamelmeyer acted as the sighted guide for blind skier Michele Drolet in cross-country skiing events. The pair finished fifth in the women's long distance (10 km) B1) in a time of one hour, 10 minutes, 6.8 seconds, and sixth in the women's short distance (5 km B1) in 25 minutes, 58.4 seconds.

He competed at his second Paralympic Games in 1994 in Lillehammer, Norway, where he again acted as the sighted guide for Drolet. They finished fifth in both the 5 km and 10 km classical technique B1 events, before winning a bronze medal in the 5 km free technique B1. Drolet finished in a time of 20 minutes 8.7 seconds, and became the first American woman to win a Paralympic or Olympic medal in cross-country skiing.

He was named assistant coach of the United States Paralympic Cross-country Skiing Team in 1995. He became head coach from 1998 until 2006, during which time the United States won 11 Paralympic medals in cross-country skiing. After leaving his position as head coach, he continued to be involved with the United States Olympic Committee as a development coach.

In February 2014, during the Winter Paralympics held in Sochi, Russia, Kreamelmeyer was inducted into the Paralympic Hall of Fame alongside visually impaired skiers Eric Villalon Fuentes from Spain and Verena Bentele from Germany.
