= Geoff Trappett =

Australian Paralympic athlete

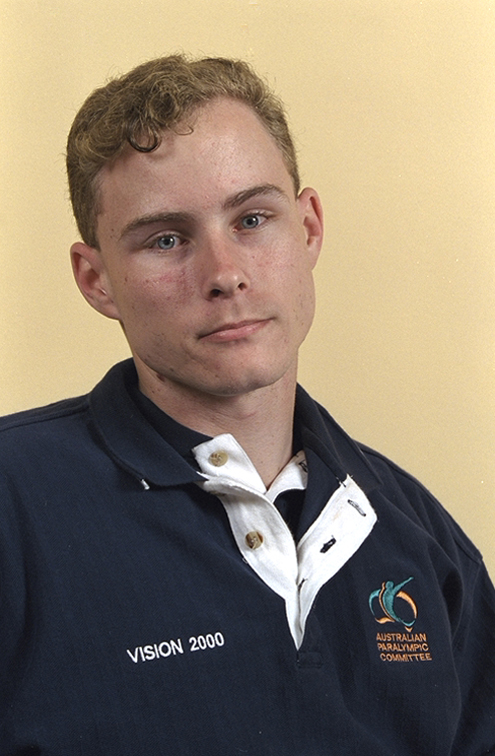
- 2000 Australian Paralympic team portrait of Trappett

Personal information
- Full name: Geoffrey Douglas Trappett
- Nationality: Australia
- Born: 18 September 1979 (age 46) Brisbane
Medal record
Athletics
Paralympic Games
Gold medal – first place	2000 Sydney	Men's 100 m T54
Silver medal – second place	2000 Sydney	Men's 4x100 m T54
Silver medal – second place	2004 Athens	Men's 4x100 m T53–54
IPC Athletics World Championships
Gold medal – first place	2002 Lille	Men's 200 m T54
Bronze medal – third place	2002 Lille	Men's 100 m T54

Geoffrey Douglas Trappett, OAM (born 18 September 1979) is an Australian Paralympic athlete who won three medals over two Paralympics.

== Early life ==
Trappett was born in Brisbane on 18 September 1979 with spina bifida. He grew up in the Brisbane suburb of Albany Creek and attended the Queensland Academy of Sport.

== Sporting career ==
In 1999, Trappett won two gold medals and broke two national records in the Men's 100 m and 200 m events, at the National Championships in Canberra and the Metro Challenge in Toronto, respectively. At the 2000 Sydney Paralympics, he won a gold medal in the Men's 100 m T54 event, for which he received a Medal of the Order of Australia, and a silver medal in the Men's 4x100 m T54 event. He was coached by Brett Jones in the twelve months before the 2000 Paralympics.

In 2003 at an event in Canberra, he set a world record in the 100 m sprint; however he disqualified himself because he had made a false start that no one else had noticed. Two weeks later he ran the same event in the Gold Coast in a world-record time of 13.99 seconds. At the 2004 Athens Paralympics, he won a silver medal in the Men's 4x100 m T53–54 event.

In 2009, he was one of the first 150 people to be added to the Queensland Sport Hall of Fame.

== Post Sporting Career ==
In 2009 he became the Senior Engagement and Services Delivery Officer with the Cerebral Palsy League Queensland.

Trappett is an advocate for those with a disability. He founded Inclusion Moves which is involved in facilitating, awareness campaigns, advocacy and training in the disability area.

He is married to Masako.
