= Ulla Renvall =

Personal information
- Nationality: Sweden
- Born: Sweden

Sport
- Sport: Paralympic athletics Paralympic cross-country skiing

Ulla Renvall is a former Swedish Paralympic Nordic skiing and athletics coach.

During the 2006 Winter Paralympics she was inducted into the Paralympic Hall of Fame.

== Trained athletes ==
- 1976 Winter Paralympics: Birgitta Sundh
- 1980 Winter Paralympics: Birgitta Sundh, Desiree Johansson
- 1984 Summer Paralympics: Monica Wetterström, Gunnar Tomsson
- 1988 Summer Paralympics: Monica Wetterström
- 1992 Summer Paralympics: Monica Wetterström
