= Saúl Mendoza =

Mexican wheelchair racer (born 1967)

Medal record

Men's athletics

Representing Mexico

Paralympic Games
| Gold medal – first place | 1996 Atlanta | 5000 m T52-53 |
| Gold medal – first place | 2004 Athens | 1500 m T54 |
| Silver medal – second place | 1988 Seoul | 200 m Cat. 4 |
| Bronze medal – third place | 1988 Seoul | 800 m Cat. 4 |
| Bronze medal – third place | 1988 Seoul | 5000 m Cat. 4 |
| Bronze medal – third place | 2000 Sydney | 800 m T54 |

Parapan American Games
| Gold medal – first place | 2007 Rio de Janeiro | 800m T54 |
| Gold medal – first place | 2007 Rio de Janeiro | 1500m T54 |
| Gold medal – first place | 2007 Rio de Janeiro | 5000m T54 |
| Gold medal – first place | 2011 Guadalajara | 800m T54 |
| Silver medal – second place | 2011 Guadalajara | 1500m T54 |
| Silver medal – second place | 2011 Guadalajara | 5000m T54 |
| Silver medal – second place | 2011 Guadalajara | Marathon T54 |

Olympic Games (demonstration sport)
| 1st | 2000 Sydney | Wheelchair racing |
| 2nd | 2004 Athens | Wheelchair racing |

Saúl Mendoza Hernández (born January 6, 1967, in Mexico City) is a Mexican former wheelchair racer, who competed at the Olympic and Paralympic levels.

He acquired polio when he was 6 months old and grew up playing a variety of different sports. At the 2000 Olympic Games, he finished first in the demonstration event of Men's 1500m wheelchair. He finished second in the same event at the 2004 Summer Olympics. He won six medals in different athletics events at the Paralympic Games – 2 gold, 1 silver, and 3 bronze – in a career that spanned from Seoul 1988 to Beijing 2008. He was the flag-bearer for the Mexican team in the Sydney 2000 and Beijing 2008 Paralympic Games.

Mendoza won the Men's Wheelchair Race of the London Marathon in 2004 in controversial circumstances after following a police motorbike through a shortcut on the course near the turn-around at The Cutty Sark, cutting the course short by approximately 200m. He went on to finish the race with a comfortable lead ahead of British athlete David Weir and escaped disqualification. He went on to defend this title in 2005. He has also won the wheelchair division in the Twin Cities Marathon nine times.

The 2008 Paralympic Games were his sixth and final Paralympic appearance, as he had previously announced he would retire from competition after the Games. Online records indicate he competed in the 2012 Paralympics, and is currently active on Linked In, a professional networking group.

However, he returned to the sport to compete in the 2012 London Paralympic marathon on Sunday 9 September having earlier in the season set a new personal best of 1:24:23.
