= Louise Sauvage =

Australian paralympic athlete (born 1973)

Louise Sauvage OAM
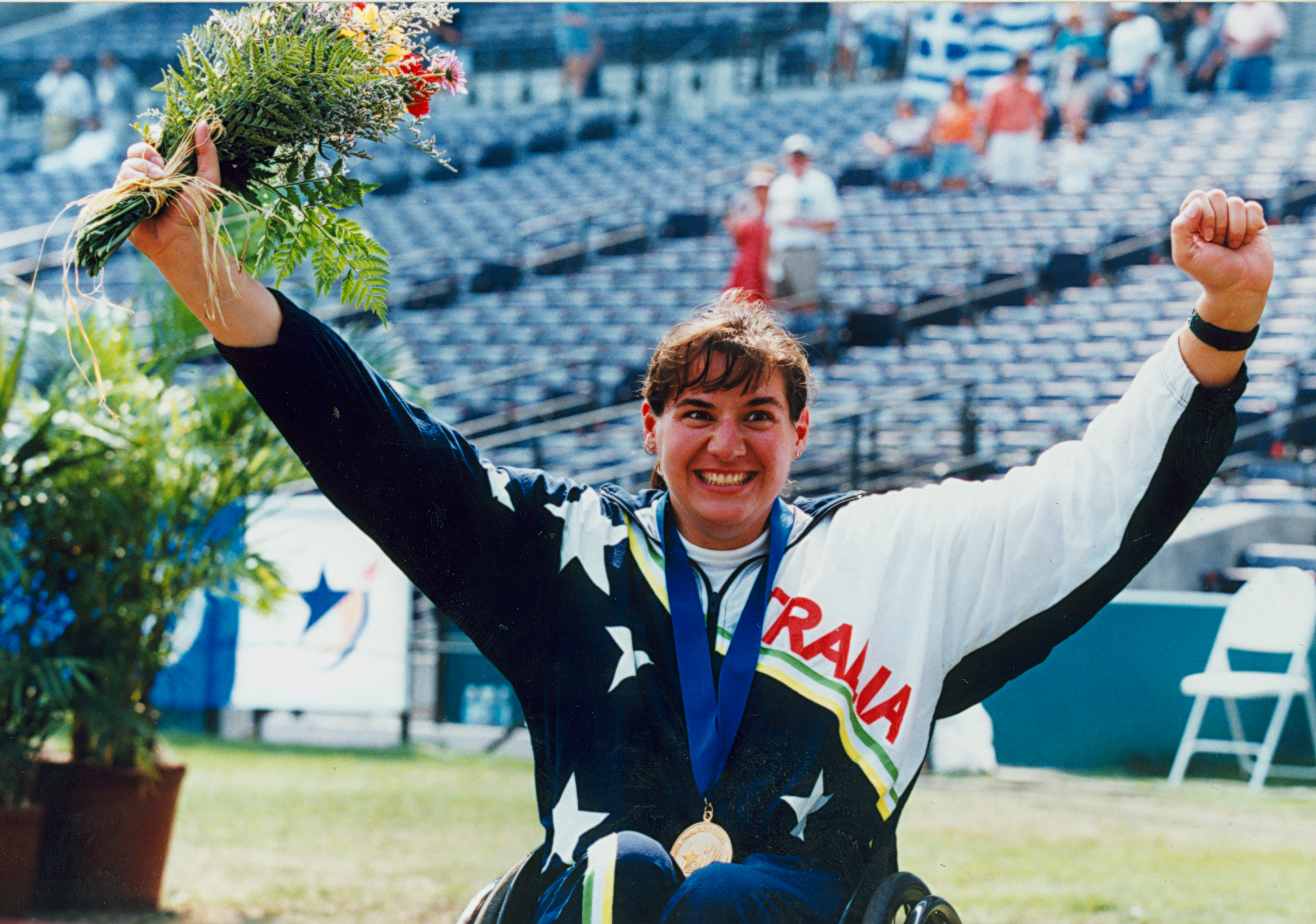
- Sauvage in 1996

Personal information
- Full name: Alix Louise Sauvage
- Nationality: Australian
- Born: 18 September 1973 (age 53) Perth, Western Australia
Medal record
Women's wheelchair racing
Paralympic Games
Gold medal – first place	1992 Barcelona	100 m TW4
Gold medal – first place	1992 Barcelona	200 m TW4
Gold medal – first place	1992 Barcelona	400 m TW4
Gold medal – first place	1996 Atlanta	400 m T53
Gold medal – first place	1996 Atlanta	800 m T53
Gold medal – first place	1996 Atlanta	1500 m T52-53
Gold medal – first place	1996 Atlanta	5000 m T52-53
Gold medal – first place	2000 Sydney	5000 m T54
Gold medal – first place	2000 Sydney	1500 m T54
Silver medal – second place	1992 Barcelona	800 m TW4
Silver medal – second place	2000 Sydney	800 m T54
Silver medal – second place	2004 Athens	400 m T54
Silver medal – second place	2004 Athens	800 m T54
World Para Athletics Championships
Gold medal – first place	1994 Berlin	800 m T53
Gold medal – first place	1994 Berlin	1500 m T53
Gold medal – first place	1994 Berlin	5000 m T53
Gold medal – first place	1994 Berlin	Marathon T53
Gold medal – first place	1998 Birmingham	800 m T55
Gold medal – first place	1998 Birmingham	1500 m T55
Gold medal – first place	1998 Birmingham	5000 m T55
Gold medal – first place	1998 Birmingham	Marathon T55
Gold medal – first place	1998 Birmingham	4 x 100 m (T54-55)
Gold medal – first place	1998 Birmingham	4 x 400 m (T54-55)
Gold medal – first place	2002 Lille	800 m T54
Silver medal – second place	2002 Lille	1500 m T54
Silver medal – second place	2002 Lille	5000 m T54
World Championships and Games for the Disabled
Gold medal – first place	1990 Assen	100 m
Olympic Games (demonstration sport)
1st	1996 Atlanta	800 m
1st	2000 Sydney	800 m
3rd	2004 Athens	800 m
Commonwealth Games
Silver medal – second place	2002 Manchester	800 m
IAAF World Athletics Championships
Gold medal – first place	1993	Women's wheelchair
Gold medal – first place	1995	Women's wheelchair
Gold medal – first place	1997	800 m
Gold medal – first place	2001	Women's wheelchair
Boston Marathon
Gold medal – first place	1997	Women's wheelchair
Gold medal – first place	1998	Women's wheelchair
Gold medal – first place	1999	Women's wheelchair
Gold medal – first place	2001	Women's wheelchair
Los Angeles Marathon
Gold medal – first place	1997	Women's wheelchair
Silver medal – second place	1995	Women's wheelchair
Beppu-Ōita Marathon
Gold medal – first place	1996	Women's wheelchair
Berlin Marathon
Gold medal – first place	1997	Women's wheelchair

Alix Louise Sauvage, OAM (born 18 September 1973) is an Australian paralympic wheelchair racer and leading coach.

Sauvage is often regarded as the most renowned disabled sportswoman in Australia. She won nine gold and four silver medals at four Paralympic Games and eleven gold and two silver medals at three IPC Athletics World Championships. She has won four Boston Marathons, and held world records in the 1500 m, 5000 m and 4x100 m and 4x400 m relays. She was Australian Female Athlete of the Year in 1999, and International Female Wheelchair Athlete of the Year in 1999 and 2000. In 2002, her autobiography Louise Sauvage: My Story was published.

== Early life ==
When I first started off I was in the human interest pages of the paper – the fact that I did a sport and the article was about my sport didn't matter – I had a disability and it was warm and fuzzy. It wasn't until I made it to where everyone else was, in the sports pages, where any elite athlete deserves to be, that I thought, 'OK they're taking me seriously now, this is good'.

— Louise Sauvage

Sauvage was born in 1973 in Perth, Western Australia, the daughter of Rita (née Rigden) and Maurice Sauvage. Her mother was a Ten Pound Pom from Leicestershire, England, while her father was born in the British colony of Seychelles. She was born with a severe congenital spinal condition called myelomeningocele, which inhibits the function of the lower half of the body, giving limited control over the legs. In 1976 she was Perth's Telethon Child as part of a Channel 7 fund-raiser for children with disabilities. She used calipers to help walk until she received her first wheelchair. Her myelomeningocele required her to have 21 surgical operations by the time she was ten years old. As a preteen, Sauvage had scoliosis, and at 14, she had surgery to fix a curvature in her spine, using steel rods. The operation was only partially successful, and as an adult, she still has a curve of roughly 49 degrees. She has not had any subsequent surgery to fix the curve in her spine.

Sauvage grew up in Joondanna, Western Australia, attending Tuart Hill Primary School and Hollywood Senior High School before leaving to complete a TAFE course in office and secretarial studies. She underwent 20 operations before the age of 10. Her parents encouraged her to participate in sport from a very young age. She started swimming when she was three years old, with her parents enrolling her in swimming classes to help her build upper body strength. Sauvage started to compete in wheelchair sport at the age of eight. Before that time, she had attempted to play school sport with her classmates but her disability made it difficult. She took up competitive wheelchair racing when she was 15. Sauvage also tried wheelchair basketball as a youngster.

== Competitive athletic career ==
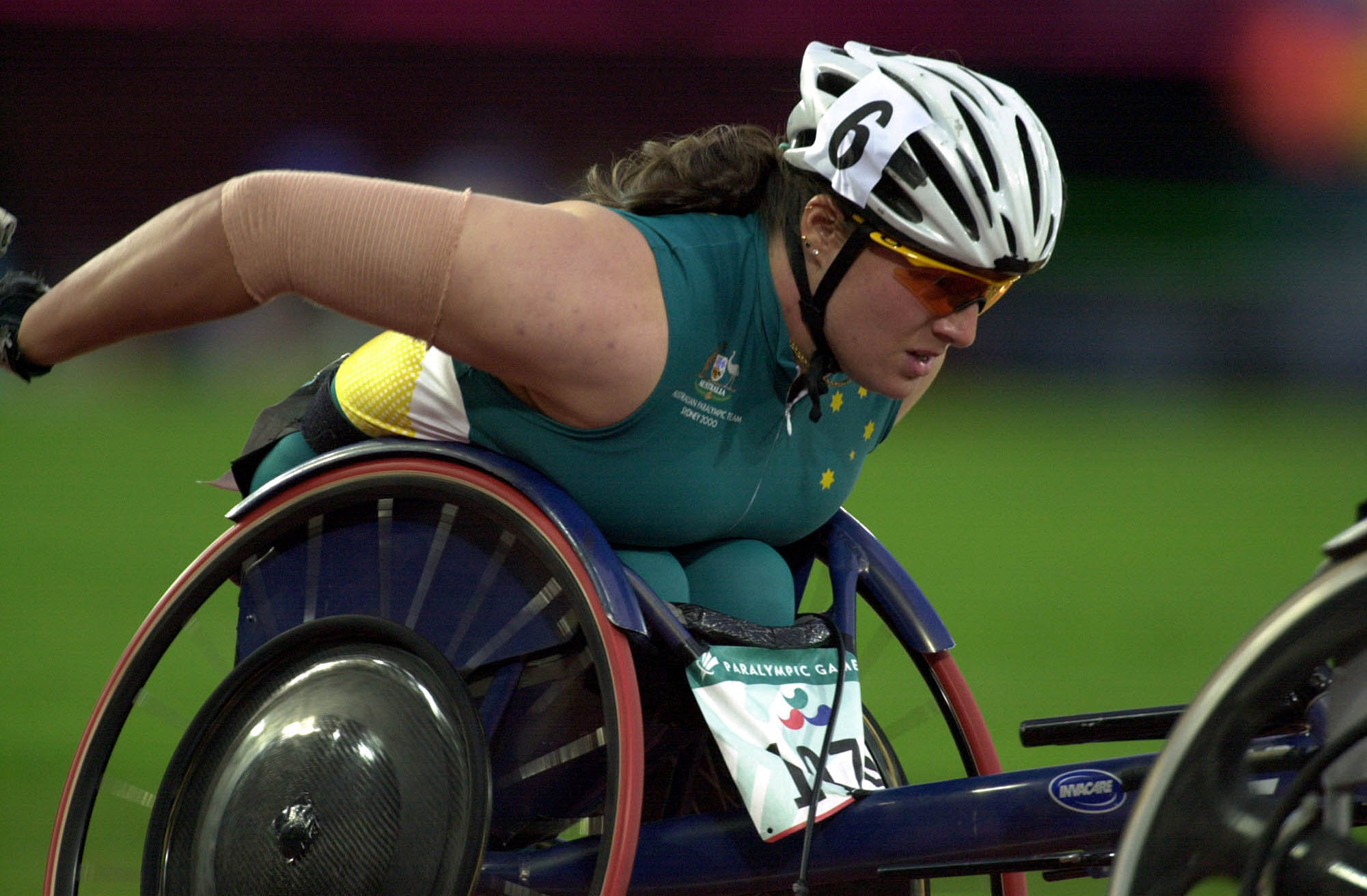
Action shot of Sauvage on her way to winning silver in the 800 m T54 wheelchair race at the 2000 Summer Paralympics

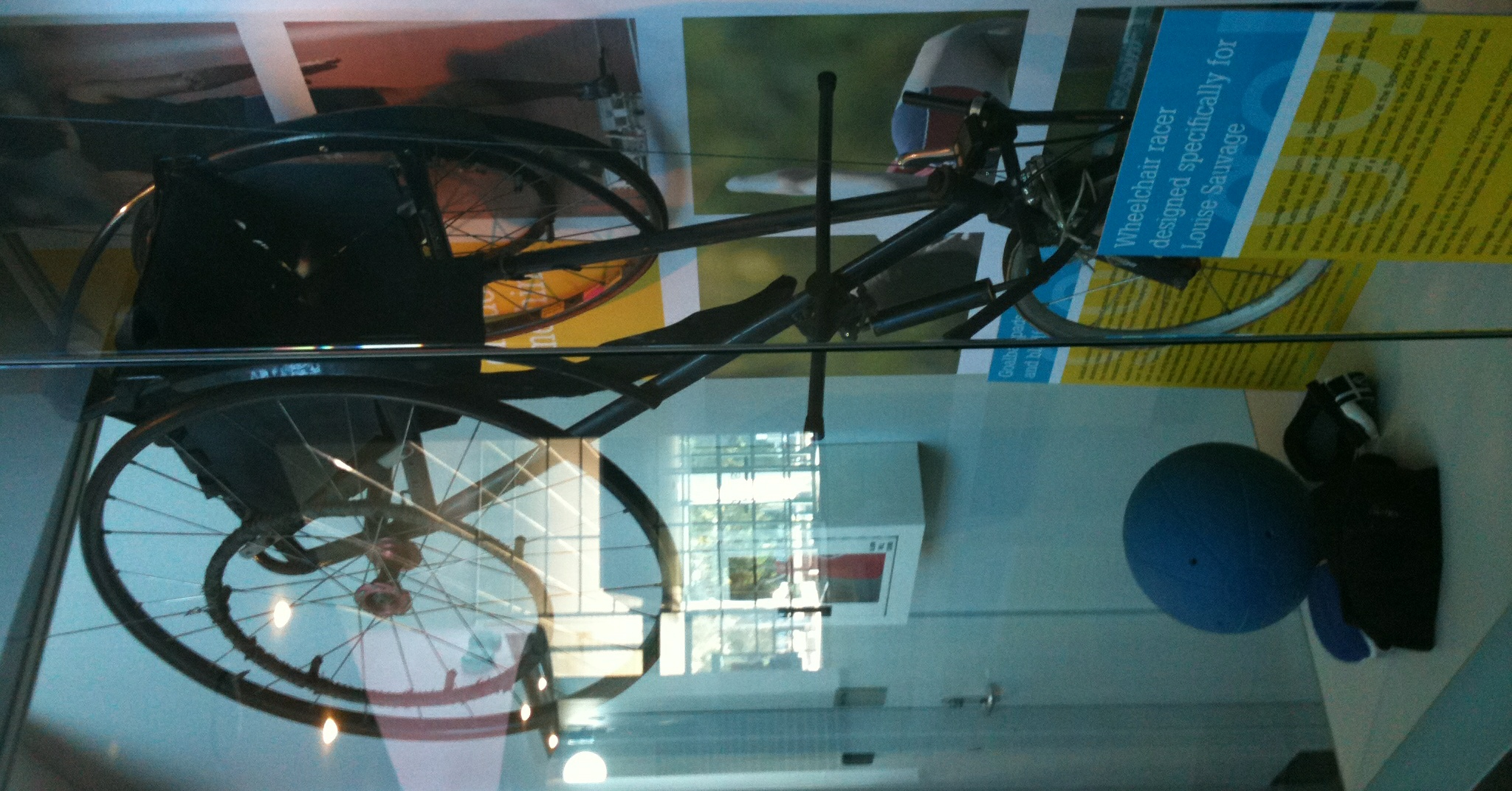
Louise Sauvage's wheelchair from the 1996 Paralympic Games

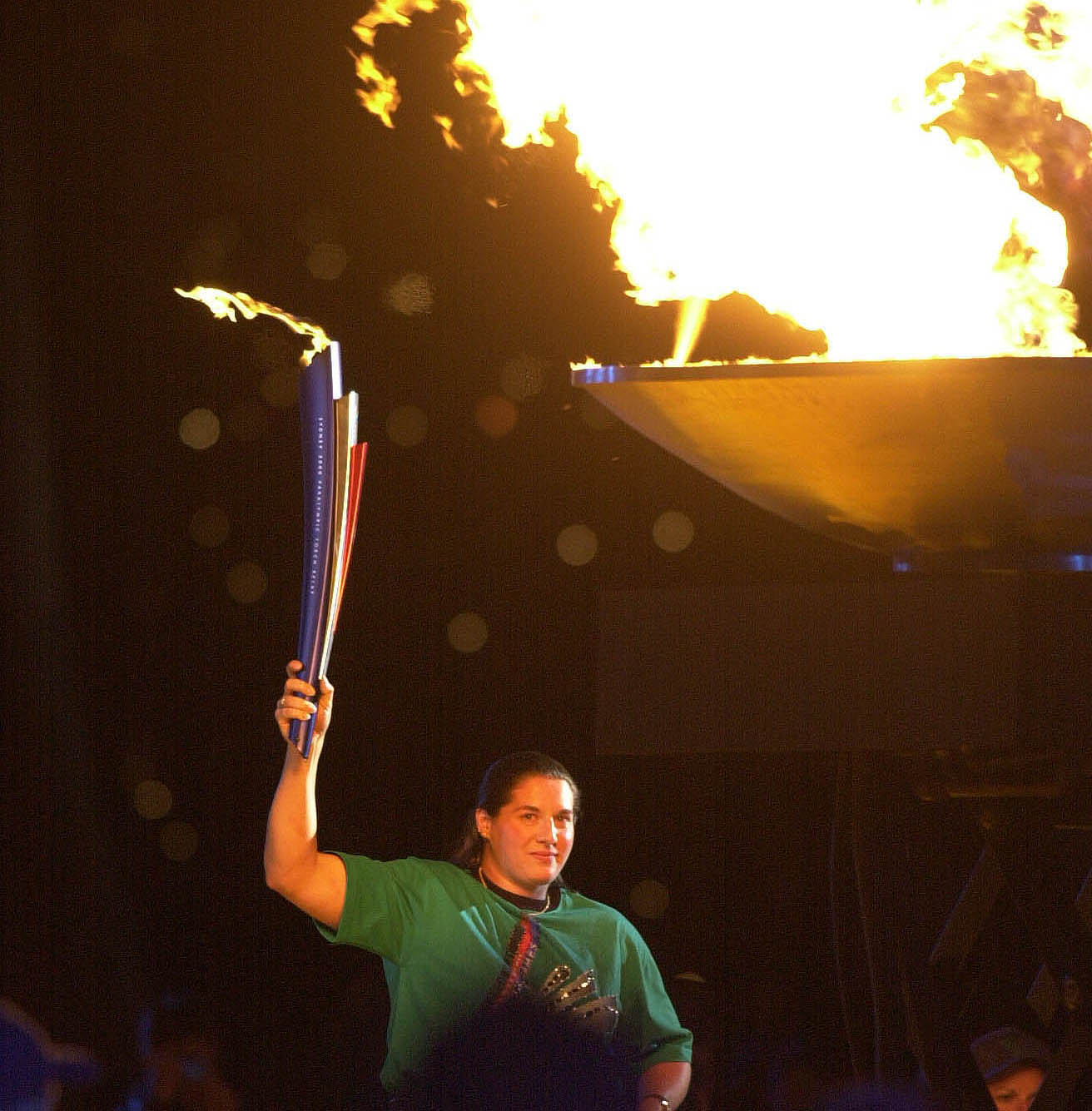
Sauvage lights the Paralympic flame at the 2000 Summer Paralympics

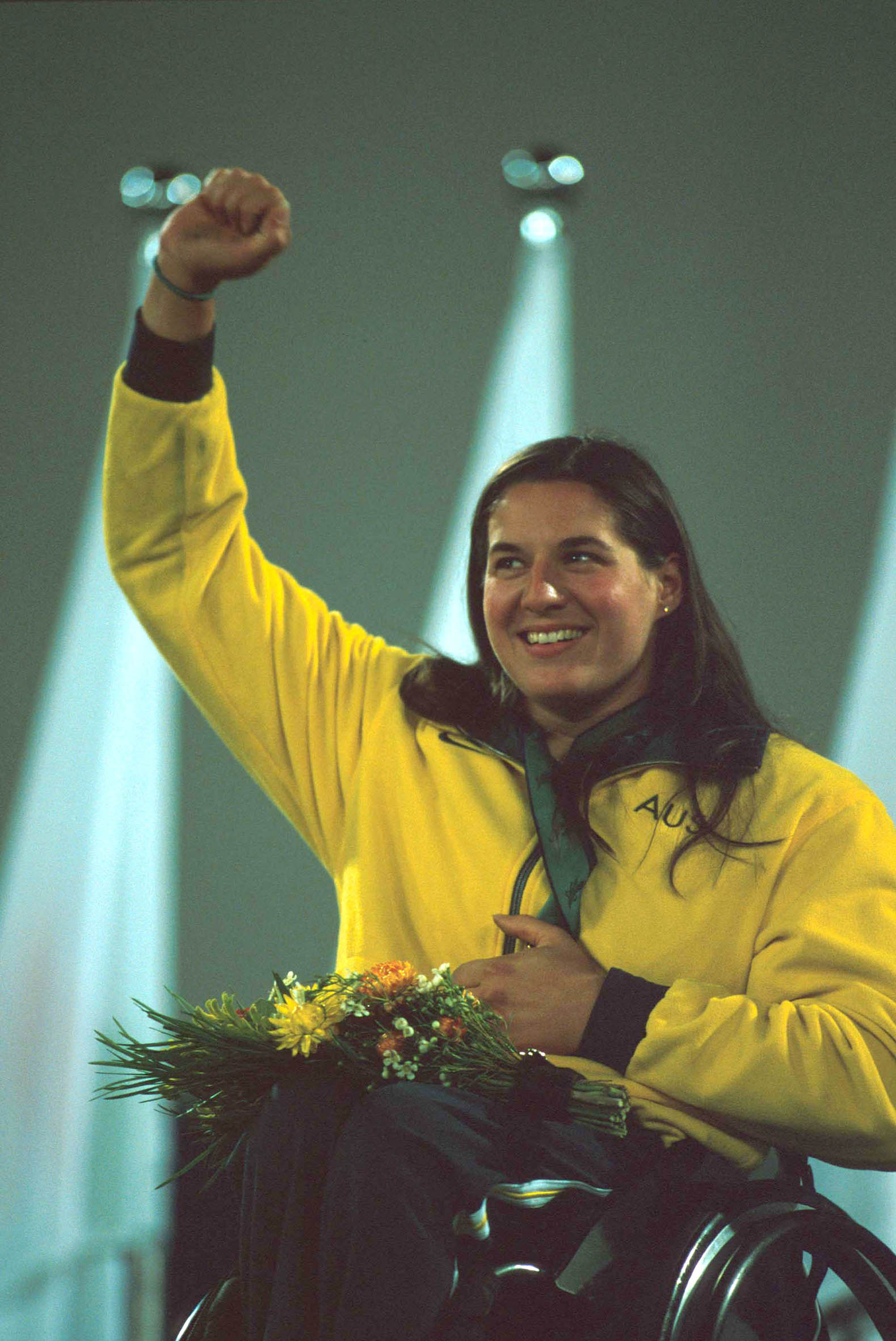
Sauvage shown waving to the crowd whilst on the medal podium at the 2000 Summer Paralympics

If I had to pick my greatest moment, it would be winning the demonstration event at the 2000 Games and coming back later that evening and having my medal presented to me by Juan Antonio Samaranch, who was head of the IOC. I was on the dais in the No.1 position, and the flag was being raised and the anthem was being played because you're No.1. You have got 110,000 people singing the anthem with you, it's just unbelievable. There was no time to be emotional, I just couldn't stop smiling, it was just awesome.

— Louise Sauvage

From the ages of 10 to 13, Sauvage represented Western Australia in the national swim championships. She was forced to retire from swimming when she turned 14, because of surgery.

When Sauvage first started competing in wheelchair racing, the chairs all had four wheels and were similar to the chairs that they used off the track. The chairs did not have any form of steering. The front wheels were smaller than the back wheels, and when at high speed, they were prone to wobbling. By 1997, racing wheelchairs had basically finished undergoing massive changes to improve them.

In 1990, Sauvage competed in her first international competition in Assen, Holland, where she won gold in the 100 m setting a new world record. She also won the 200 m race but was disqualified for moving out of her lane. At the Stoke Mandeville Games in England the same year, Sauvage took gold in the 100 m, 200 m, 400 m, and two relays.

=== Paralympic Games ===
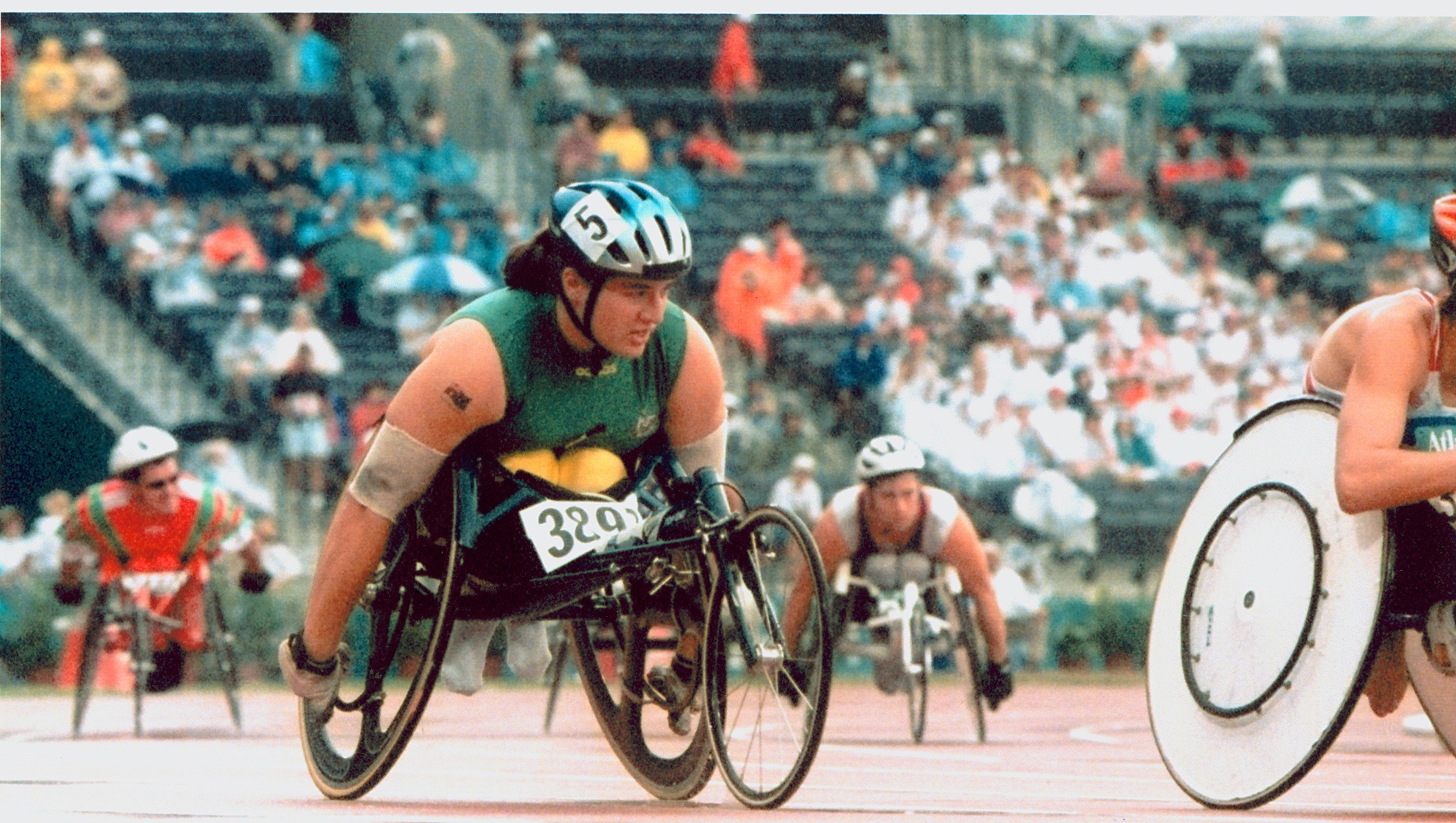
Australian athlete Louise Sauvage races at the 1996 Atlanta Paralympic Games

Before the start of the 1992 Summer Paralympics, Sauvage held Australian records for the 100 m, 200 m, 800 m, 1500 m and marathon in women's wheelchair racing events. She was being marketed by the Australian Paralympic Federation as Australia's top female wheelchair road racer. At the Barcelona Paralympic Games, she won gold medals in the 100 m, 200 m and 400 m and a silver in the 800 m TW4 events and finished sixth in Marathon TW3-4. In recognition of her athletic feats she was awarded a Medal of the Order of Australia. Sauvage was in danger of not going to the 1992 Paralympics because of funding issues for the Australian Paralympic Federation. The Federation made an emergency appeal for funding from the public in order to cover the cost of transporting the Australian team to Barcelona. The Federation found funding through a variety of small donations that allowed Sauvage and other Australian athletes to compete.

At the 1996 Atlanta Paralympic Games, she won four gold medals - 400 m (T53), 800 m (T53), 1500 m (T52-53) and 1500 m (T52-53) and finished fourth in Marathon (T52-53). She won these while having an injured wrist. She set world records in the 1500 m and 5000 m events during these Games. Sauvage won the 5000 m and the 400 m golds only an hour apart. At her final Paralympics in Sydney, 2000, she won two gold medals - 1500 m and 5000 m T54 events and silver medal in 800 m T54.

=== IPC Athletics World championships ===
Sauvage competed at three IPC Athletics World Championships. At the 1994 Championships in Berlin, Germany, she won four gold medals in T53 events - 800 m, 1500 m, 5000 m and Marathon. At the 1998 Championships in Birmingham, England, she won six gold medals in 800 m, 1500 m, 5000 m, Marathon - T55 events, 4 × 100 m and 4 × 400 m (T54-55). At her final Championships in 2002 at Lille, France, she won gold medal in 800 m T54 and silver medals in 1500 m and 5000 m T54.

=== Road racing ===
1993 was Sauvage's first year on the international wheelchair racing circuit, competing in the US and Europe. It was also the year that she got her first kneeling wheelchair. The pinnacle being the world-famous Boston Marathon where she recorded her first victory, in the women's wheelchair division, in 1997, breaking the stranglehold of the 'Queen of Boston', US racer Jean Driscoll. Sauvage went on to win a further three Boston titles in 1998, 1999 and 2001. She has won the Los Angeles Marathon, Honolulu Marathon and Berlin Marathon. Sauvage won the prestigious Oz Day 10K Wheelchair Road Race ten times – 1993–1999 and 2001–2003.

=== Demonstration events ===
From 1993 to 2001, Sauvage won every IAAF wheelchair demonstration event at IAAF World Athletics Championships. In that same period, she also won the demonstration events for wheelchair racing in the 800 metre race at the Olympic games. The 800 metre event does not require that athletes stay in their lanes after the first turn. For this reason, athletes like Sauvage are required to wear helmets when racing. In 2000, Sauvage won the Olympic demonstration event and was expected to win the Paralympic gold. She was upset by Canadian Chantal Petitclerc. The Australian delegation appealed the result, claiming the race was not fair because another racer, Ireland's Patrice Dockery, was disqualified for leaving her lane too early. The appeal was rejected, because Dockery was too far behind the front runners to impact the results. Sport academics who research the Paralympic Games consider this protest to be pivotal, because it shows the passion of athletes to win and the extent that sports people will go to claim gold. It also highlighted that the rivalries in the sport were real. Petitclerc said of her rivalry with Sauvage that "I dream more about Louise than I do my boyfriend." In 2002, Petitclerc beat Sauvage again at the 2002 Commonwealth Games, where the 800 metre event was a full medal event at the games for the first time. It was only the second time that Sauvage had lost to Petitclerc.

I think I was just so pumped up from the 5000 m, and warm enough, and hearing the anthem for Dave Evans [who had just won the men's 1500 m event] – that was fantastic to hear that in the background.

— Louise Sauvage

== Training ==
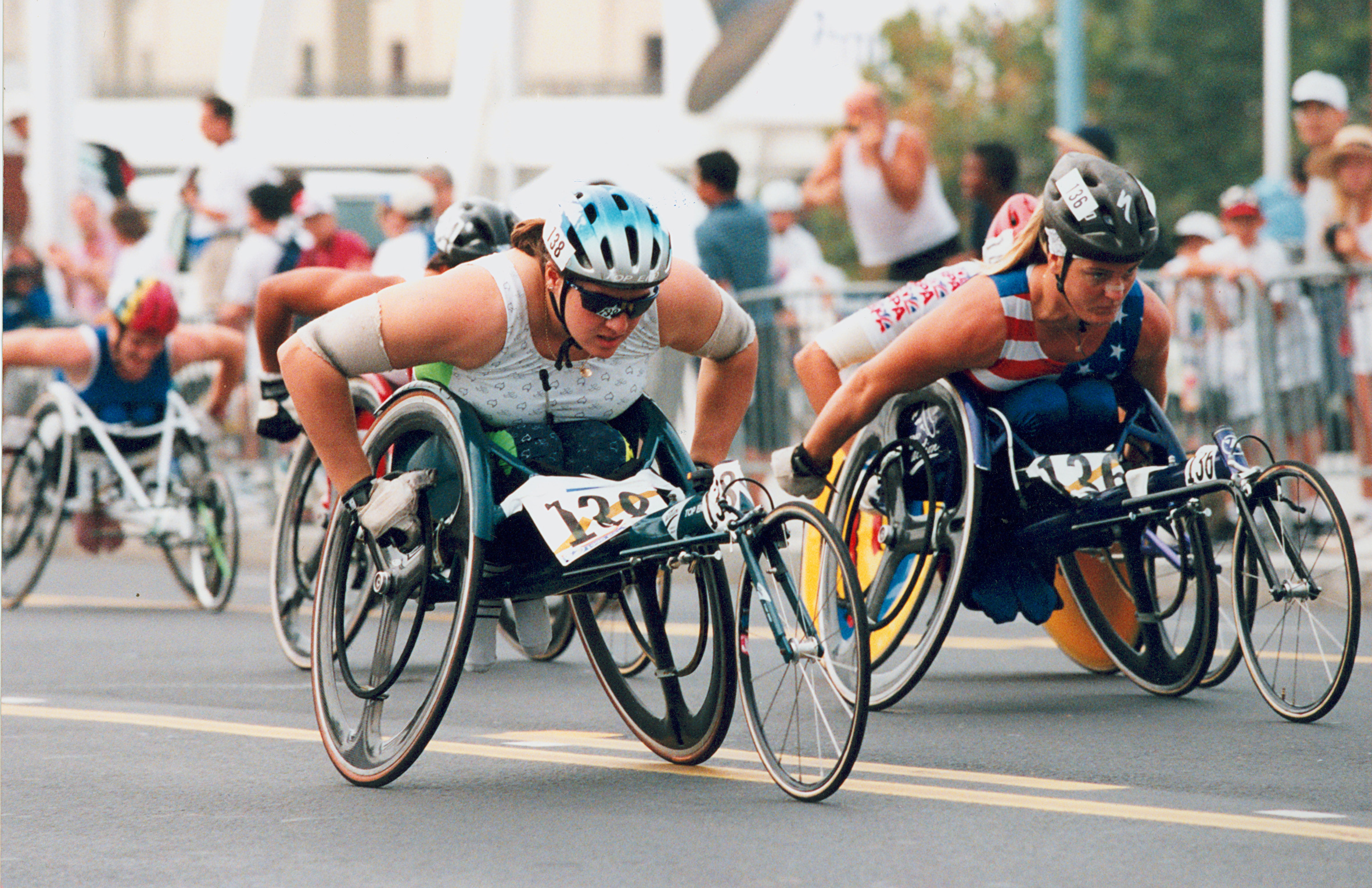
Australian T53 wheelchair athlete Louise Sauvage competes in the marathon at the 1996 Atlanta Paralympic Games.

Sauvage trained 10 to 14 hours a week when she was actively competing. Her training was very focused, and she attempted to make it fun to help her maintain interest. She often trained six days a week. Her training included boxing, swimming and racing between 25 and 35 km in a single session.

Frank Ponta was one of Sauvage's first coaches. She was subsequently coached by Jenni Banks, who oversaw much of Sauvage's development as an elite wheelchair athlete, from her first international success at the World Games in Assen in 1990, to her best ever medal tally at the Olympic and Paralympic Games in Atlanta in 1996. Andrew Dawes was her coach after the 1996 Paralympics.

== Coaching career ==
After her retirement from competition, she became involved in coaching young wheelchair athletes, establishing a foundation to help support children with disabilities in 2001. In 2004, Sauvage started coaching other wheelchair athletes. The first athlete that she coached was Angie Ballard. Sauvage's coaching helped Ballard win gold 400 m and silver in the 100 m, 200 m, 800 m and 1500 m at the Summer Down Under Series in 2005.

Sauvage has attended several international competitions as a coach. She was an athletics coach with the Australian team 2008 Beijing Games and 2011 IPC Athletics World Championships. She is currently Wheelchair Track & Road Elite Development Coach at the New South Wales Institute of Sport and coaches Madison de Rozario.

== Retirement ==
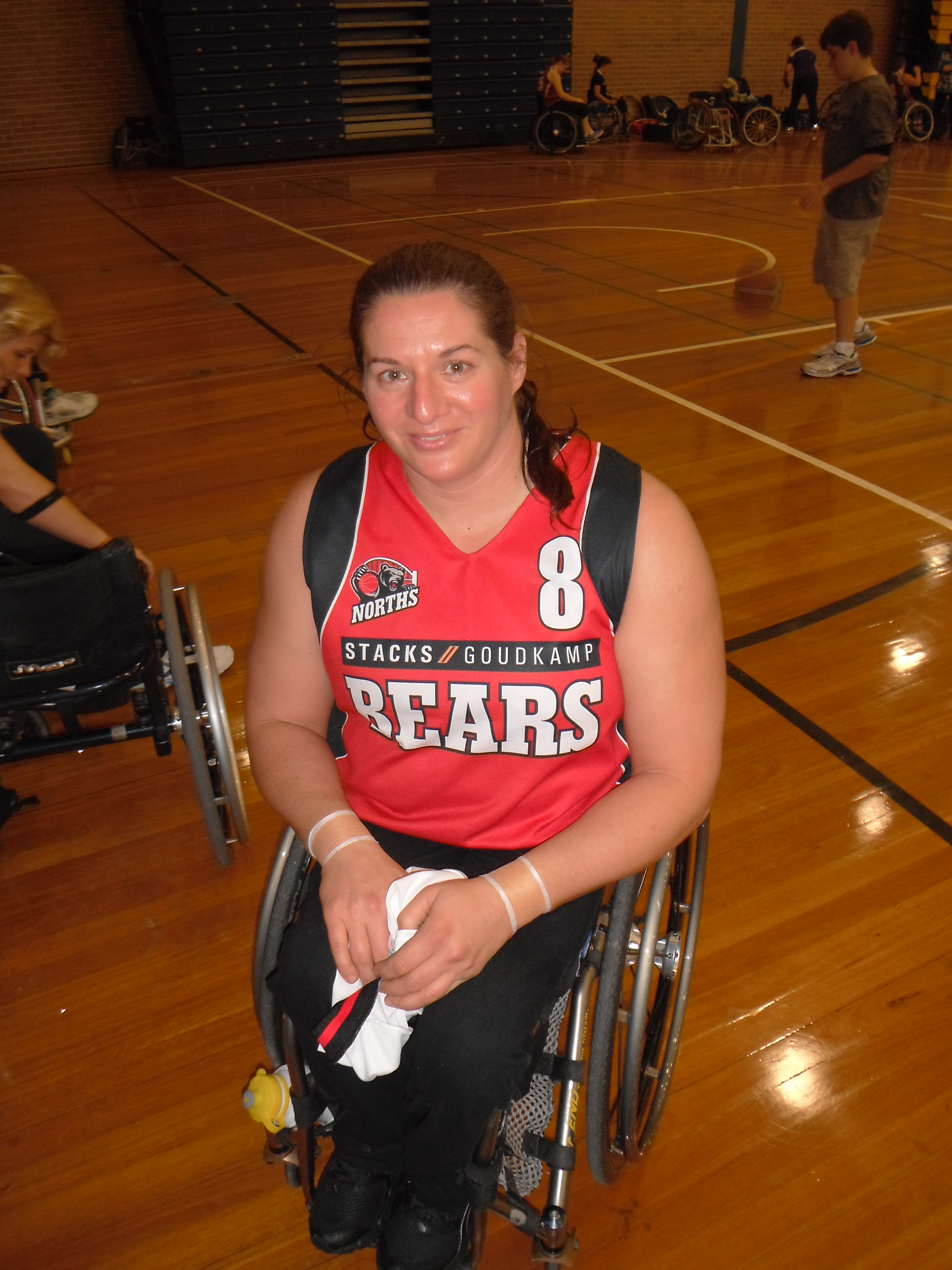
As a wheelchair basketball player for the Stacks Goudcamp Bears in the WNWBL in 2013

During her retirement from being an athlete, Sauvage created a consulting company that she works for. In 2010, Sauvage was a speaker at the IPC Women in Sport Summit. She spoke alongside Amy Winters and Jayme Paris.

In February 2011, Sauvage participated in the Charter Hall Malabar Magic Ocean Swim. The event was created to raise funds for Rainbow Club. It was Sauvage's first ocean swim. She finished the 1 km race in 25:19.

In 2011, as part of the Australian Centre for Paralympic Studies oral history project of the National Library of Australia, Ian Jobling conducted an extensive interview with Sauvage.

== Disability rights ==
Sauvage and Paul Nunnar lobbied Virgin Blue during 2006 to drop a requirement that people in wheelchairs be accompanied by a carer if they wish to ride on a Virgin Blue aircraft. Previously, both athletes had tried to lobby Qantas to lift a limit of only two electric wheelchairs on domestic flights flying on Boeing 737s. The pair were ineffective because the change would have required a change in law, not in airline policy. Sauvage and Nunnar did receive an invitation to help train Qantas staff and help make staff more aware of the needs of disabled people.

== Recognition ==
Sport is my life. I have made a career out of it – I am a professional athlete. Living in Australia we are all very sport minded and I cannot see a life without it.

— Louise Sauvage

Sauvage was the Australian Paralympian of the Year in 1994, 1996, 1997 and 1998. She was also the Australian Institute of Sport (AIS) Athlete of the year in 1997 and in 2001 inducted into the AIS 'Best of the Best'. In 1998, she won the Australian of the Year Award in the ABIGGRIUOP National Sports Award category. In 2000, Sauvage was named the Female Athlete of the Year in the Sport Australia Awards. In 2000, she was named the "World Sportsperson of the Year with a Disability" at the first Laureus Sports Awards held in Monte Carlo. In 1999 and 2000, she was named the International Female Athlete of the Year. She was awarded the Australian Sports Medal in 2000.

At the 2000 Summer Paralympics in Sydney, Sauvage lit the cauldron during the opening ceremonies for the games. In 2004, Sauvage carried the Australian flag into the stadium at the 2004 Summer Paralympics.

In 2001, the State Transit Authority named a SuperCat ferry after Sauvage. The Louise Sauvage Pathway, a 6.3-kilometre (3.9 mi) wheelchair-accessible bicycle and walking path within Sydney Olympic Park, is also named in her honour. Sauvage and New South Wales Treasurer Michael Egan christened the park on 6 March 2003.

She was inducted onto the Victorian Honour Roll of Women in 2001 and into the Sport Australia Hall of Fame in 2007. In 2009, Sauvage was awarded Legend status in the New South Wales Hall of Champions. In 2011, she was one of the first people to be inducted into the Australian Paralympian Hall of Fame, along with Frank Ponta and George Bedbrook. In 2012, she was inducted into the International Paralympic Hall of Fame. In 2014, she was inducted into the Athletics Australia Hall of Fame and the Sydney Olympic Park Athletic Centre Path of Champions.

In November 2018, Sauvage was awarded Sport NSW Coach of the Year. Young Athlete of the Year with a Disability. In 2019, Sauvage was made a Legend in the Sport Australia Hall of Fame. She became the first Australian Paralympian to be awarded Legend status.

Sauvage was awarded Paralympics Australia 2020 Coach of the Year.

In November 2021, she was awarded New South Wales Institute of Sport Coach of the Year. In 2025, she was an inaugural inductee of the Stadium Australia Hall of Fame.

Several Paralympians cite Sauvage as inspiring them to become athletes, including wheelchair racer Kurt Fearnley.

Olympic Games
Preceded by Naoya Maruyama	Final Paralympic Torchbearer; Sydney 2000	Succeeded by Muffy Davis and Chris Waddell
Preceded by Mark Wellman	Final Summer Paralympic Torchbearer; Sydney 2000	Succeeded by Georgios Toptsis
