= Claude Issorat =

French Paralympic athlete

Medal record

Men's para athletics

Representing France

Paralympic Games
| Gold medal – first place | 1992 Barcelona | 100 metres - TW4 |
| Gold medal – first place | 1992 Barcelona | 200 metres - TW4 |
| Gold medal – first place | 1996 Atlanta | 200 metres - T53 |
| Gold medal – first place | 1996 Atlanta | 400 metres - T53 |
| Gold medal – first place | 1996 Atlanta | 4x400m - T53 |
| Gold medal – first place | 2000 Sydney | 400 metres - T54 |
| Gold medal – first place | 2000 Sydney | 4x400m - T54 |
| Silver medal – second place | 1992 Barcelona | 400 metres - TW4 |
| Silver medal – second place | 1992 Barcelona | Marathon - TW3-4 |
| Silver medal – second place | 2000 Sydney | 200 metres - T54 |
| Silver medal – second place | 2004 Athens | 4x400m - T53-54 |
| Bronze medal – third place | 1996 Atlanta | 100 metres - T53 |
| Bronze medal – third place | 2004 Athens | 4x100m - T53-54 |

Claude Issorat (born 7 February 1966, in Pointe-à-Pitre, Guadeloupe) is a Paralympian track and field athlete from France competing mainly in category T54 wheelchair racing sprint events.

Issorat is one of the most successful French track and field Paralympians with 13 medals, 7 gold, across 4 games. He has medalled in events ranging from 100 m up to marathon.
