= Cycling at the 2012 Summer Paralympics – Men's road race B =

Cycling, Men's road race B at the XIV Paralympic Games
- Venue: Brands Hatch
- Dates: 8 September 2012
- Competitors: 18 from 14 nations

Medalists
1st place, gold medalist(s)		Ivano Pizzi; Lucca Pizzi	Italy
2nd place, silver medalist(s)		Krzysztof Kosikowski; Artur Korc	Poland
3rd place, bronze medalist(s)		Vladislav Janovjak; Robert Mitosinka	Slovakia

The Men's road race B event at the 2012 Summer Paralympics took place on 8 September at Brands Hatch. Eighteen riders from fourteen different nations competed. The race distance was 104 km.

== Results ==
DNF = Did Not Finish. LAP = Lapped (8 km).

Rank	Name	Country	Time
1st place, gold medalist(s)	Ivano Pizzi; Pilot: Lucca Pizzi	Italy	2:26:52
2nd place, silver medalist(s)	Krzysztof Kosikowski; Pilot: Artur Korc	Poland	2:26:57
3rd place, bronze medalist(s)	Vladislav Janovjak; Pilot: Robert Mitosinka	Slovakia	2:26:59
4	Christian Venge; Pilot: David Llaurado Caldero	Spain	2:27:09
5	Jarmo Ollanketo; Pilot: Marko Tormanen	Finland	2:27:17
6	Olivier Donval; Pilot: John Saccomandi	France	2:27:51
7	Bryce Lindores; Pilot: Sean Finning	Australia	2:28:48
8	Rinne Oost; Pilot: Patrick Bos	Netherlands	2:29:47
9	Daniel Chalifour; Pilot: Alexandre Cloutier	Canada	2:29:47
10	Clark Rachfal; Pilot: David Swanson	United States	2:29:51
11	Milan Petrovic; Pilot: Goran Smelcerovic	Serbia	2:33:37
	Alberto Lujan Nattkemper; Pilot: Jonatan Ithurrart	Argentina	LAP
	Kieran Modra; Pilot: Scott McPhee	Australia	DNF
	Miguel Angel Clemente Solano; Pilot: Diego Javier Munoz	Spain	DNF
	Mohd Khairul Hazwan Wahab; Pilot: Khairul Naim Azhar	Malaysia	DNF
	James Brown; Pilot: Damien Shaw	Ireland	DNF
	Damien Debeaupuits; Pilot: Alexis Febvay	France	DNF
	Jose Enrique Porto Lareo; Pilot: Jose Antonio Villanueva Trinidad	Spain	DNF
