= 2011 UCI Para-cycling Track World Championships – Men's individual pursuit =

Rainbow jersey

The Men's individual pursuit events at the 2011 UCI Para-cycling Track World Championships was held on March 11 and 12.

== Medalists ==
Distance	Class	Gold	Silver	Bronze
3 km	C1	Juan José Méndez; Spain	Chris Jaco Nel; South Africa	Rodrigo López; Argentina
3 km	C2	Guihua Liang; China	Fabrizio Macchi; Italy	Michal Stark; Czech Republic
3 km	C3	Darren Kenny; United Kingdom	Shaun McKeown; United Kingdom	Richard Waddon; United Kingdom
4 km	C4	Jirí Ježek; Czech Republic	Jody Cundy; United Kingdom	Carol-Eduard Novak; Romania
4 km	C5	Michael Gallagher; Australia	Xinyang Liu; China	Yegor Dementyev; Ukraine
4 km	B	Scott McPhee, Kieran Modra; Australia	Diego Javier Muñoz, Miguel Ángel Clemente; Spain	Sean Finning, Bryce Lindores; Australia

== Results ==
=== C1 ===
- C1 – locomotor disability: Neurological, or amputation

==== Qualifying ====
Rank	Name	Nation	Time	Notes
1	Juan José Méndez Fernandez	Spain	4:10.597	
2	Jaco Nel	South Africa	4:15.058	
3	Rodrigo Fernando Lopez	Argentina	4:17.350	
4	Erich Winkler	Germany	4:20.365	
5	Jaye Milley	Canada	4:23.507	
6	Brayden McDougall	Canada	4:24.813	
7	Andreas Zirkl	Austria	4:30.552	
8	Pierre Senska	Germany	4:35.789	
	Sergei Ipatov	Russia	DNF	

==== Finals ====
Rank	Name	Nation	Time
Gold Medal Race
1st place, gold medalist(s)	Juan José Méndez Fernandez	Spain	4:11.737
2nd place, silver medalist(s)	Jaco Nel	South Africa	4:15.880
Bronze Medal Race
3rd place, bronze medalist(s)	Rodrigo Fernando Lopez	Argentina	2:04.550
4	Erich Winkler	Germany	OVL

=== C2 ===
- C2 – locomotor disability: Neurological, decrease in muscle strength, or amputation

==== Qualifying ====
Rank	Name	Nation	Time	Notes
1	Gui Hua Liang	China	3:48.149	WR
2	Fabrizio Macchi	Italy	3:54.078	
3	Michal Stark	Czech Republic	3:58.178	
4	Tobias Graf	Germany	4:00.260	
5	Maurice Far Eckhard Tió	Spain	4:00.686	
6	Colin Lynch	Ireland	4:00.925	
7	Antonio Garcia Martinez	Spain	4:04.100	
8	Michael Teuber	Germany	4:05.555	
9	Alvaro Galvis Becerra	Colombia	4:06.276	
10	Xiao Ming Gao	China	4:08.630	
11	Arslan Gilmutdinov	Russia	4:13.044	
12	Stephen Hills	New Zealand	4:14.867	
13	Gijs van Butselaar	Netherlands	4:21.273	
14	Matthieu Parent	Canada	4:22.922	
15	Roger Bolliger	Switzerland	4:24.710	
16	Attila Olah	Romania	4:56.093	
	Vitorio Silvestre	Brazil	DNF	

==== Finals ====
Rank	Name	Nation	Time
Gold Medal Race
1st place, gold medalist(s)	Gui Hua Liang	China	3:51.514
2nd place, silver medalist(s)	Fabrizio Macchi	Italy	3:58.915
Bronze Medal Race
3rd place, bronze medalist(s)	Michal Stark	Czech Republic	3:57.968
4	Tobias Graf	Germany	3:58.790

=== C3 ===
- C3 – locomotor disability: Neurological, or amputation

==== Qualifying ====
Rank	Name	Nation	Time	Notes
1	Darren Kenny	United Kingdom	3:41.075	
2	Shaun Mc Keown	United Kingdom	3:42.597	
3	Richard Waddon	United Kingdom	3:44.643	
4	Nathan Smith	New Zealand	3:50.973	
5	Roberto Bargna	Italy	3:52.639	
6	Masaki Fujita	Japan	3:52.853	
7	William Chesebro	United States	3:54.419	
8	Amador Granados Alkorta	Spain	3:55.999	
9	Steffen Warias	Germany	4:05.256	
10	Miroslav Dongres	Czech Republic	4:06.849	
11	Sven Boekhoven	Netherlands	4:07.235	
12	Alexey Obydennov	Russia	4:09.815	
13	Matej Benda	Czech Republic	4:10.849	
14	Carmelo Sanchez Oviedo	Colombia	4:11.992	
15	Ivo Koblasa	Czech Republic	4:12.765	
16	Christopher Burns	Ireland	4:22.384	
17	Zhang Lu	China	4:26.709	
18	Vladislav Adanichkin	Russia	4:45.100	

==== Finals ====
Rank	Name	Nation	Time
Gold Medal Race
1st place, gold medalist(s)	Darren Kenny	United Kingdom	3:43.156
2nd place, silver medalist(s)	Shaun McKeown	United Kingdom	3:46.769
Bronze Medal Race
3rd place, bronze medalist(s)	Richard Waddon	United Kingdom	3:49.559
4	Nathan Smith	New Zealand	3:51.730

=== C4 ===
- C4 – locomotor disability: Neurological, or amputation

==== Qualifying ====
Rank	Name	Nation	Time	Notes
1	Jiří Ježek	Czech Republic	4:41.895	
2	Jody Cundy	United Kingdom	4:44.085	
3	Carol-Eduard Novak	Romania	4:46.488	
4	Diego Germán Dueñas Gómez	Colombia	4:54.196	
5	Aaron Trent	United States	4:55.520	
6	Jiri Bouska	Czech Republic	4:56.881	
7	Samuel Kavanagh	United States	5:00.118	
8	Gianluca Fantoni	Italy	5:00.600	
9	Michele Pittacolo	Italy	5:01.003	
10	Manfred Gattringer	Austria	5:04.990	
11	Masashi Ishii	Japan	5:08.285	
12	Haohua Huang	China	5:10.167	
13	Xiaofei Ji	China	5:11.020	
14	Janos Plekker	South Africa	5:12.827	
15	Eric Bourgault	Canada	5:13.131	
16	Klaus Lungershausen	Germany	5:13.267	
17	Teun Kruijff	Netherlands	5:21.728	
18	Yuan Chao Zheng	China	5:22.737	
19	Tino Käßner	Germany	5:24.169	
20	Antonin Hajek	Czech Republic	5:30.575	
21	Vitaliy Malyshev	Russia	5:59.667	
22	Vyacheslav Telelyukhin	Russia	6:13.359	

==== Finals ====
Rank	Name	Nation	Time
Gold Medal Race
1st place, gold medalist(s)	Jiří Ježek	Czech Republic	4:44.708
2nd place, silver medalist(s)	Jody Cundy	United Kingdom	4:51.919
Bronze Medal Race
3rd place, bronze medalist(s)	Carol-Eduard Novak	Romania	
4	Diego Germán Dueñas Gómez	Colombia	OVL

=== C5 ===
- C5 – locomotor disability: Neurological, or amputation

==== Qualifying ====
Rank	Name	Nation	Time	Notes
1	Michael T. Gallagher	Australia	4:37.230	WR
2	Xinyang Liu	China	4:40.573	
3	Andrea Tarlao	Italy	4:43.456	
4	Yegor Dementyev	Ukraine	4:44.085	
5	Cathal Miller	Ireland	4:45.483	
6	Lauro Chaman	Brazil	4:46.810	
7	Wolfgang Sacher	Germany	4:49.940	
8	Fabio Triboli	Italy	4:50.000	
9	Soelito Gohr	Brazil	4:51.779	
10	Jon-Allan Butterworth	United Kingdom	4:54.089	
11	Wolfgang Eibeck	Austria	4:54.146	
12	Joao Alberto Schwindt Filho	Brazil	4:56.258	
13	Vincent Juarez	United States	4:57.102	
14	Benjamin Landier	France	4:59.111	
15	Pierpaolo Addesi	Italy	5:00.270	
16	Bastiaan Gruppen	Netherlands	5:03.728	
17	Christopher Ross	New Zealand	5:04.301	
18	Edwin Fabián Mátiz Ruiz	Colombia	5:06.367	
19	Christoph Leiter	Germany	5:08.032	
20	Radim Pavlik	Czech Republic	5:10.188	
21	Takahiro Abe	Japan	5:11.673	
22	Ioannis Kalaitzakis	Greece	5:12.703	
23	Martin Bruun Jacobsen	Denmark	5:18.436	
24	Pavel Komotskiy	Russia	5:30.536	
25	Imre Torok	Romania	5:31.015	
26	Anatolii Kolunov	Russia	5:42.456	

==== Finals ====
Rank	Name	Nation	Time
Gold Medal Race
1st place, gold medalist(s)	Michael T. Gallagher	Australia	4:41.423
2nd place, silver medalist(s)	Xinyang Liu	China	4:44.060
Bronze Medal Race
3rd place, bronze medalist(s)	Yegor Dementyev	Ukraine	4:45.833
4	Andrea Tarlao	Italy	4:50.403

=== Tandem B ===
- Tandem B – visual impairment

==== Qualifying ====
Rank	Name	Nation	Time	Notes
1	Kieran Modra, Scott McPhee	Australia	4:17.780	WR
2	Miguel Ángel Clemente Solano, Diego Javier Muñoz Sanchez	Spain	4:23.918	
3	Bryce Lindores, Sean Finning	Australia	4:24.088	
4	Christian Venge Balboa, David Llaurado Caldero	Spain	4:27.011	
5	Daniel Chalifour, Alexandre Cloutier	Canada	4:27.112	
6	Clark Rachfal, David Swanson	United States	4:27.886	
7	Anthony Kappes, Barney Storey	United Kingdom	4:28.064	
8	Ivano Pizzi, Luca Pizzi	Italy	4:30.100	
9	Andrew Fitzgerald, Damien Shaw	Ireland	4:30.668	
10	Michael Delaney, Con Collis	Ireland	4:32.633	
11	Rinne Oost, Patrick Bos	Netherlands	4:33.228	
12	Brian Cowie, Luc Dionne	Canada	4:36.610	
13	Alfred Stelleman, Timo Fransen	Netherlands	4:37.698	
14	Olivier Donval, Olivier Derquenne	France	4:39.346	
15	Emanuele Bersini, Daniele Riccardo	Italy	4:40.081	
16	Richard Bonhof, Jeroen Lute	Netherlands	4:41.883	
17	Laurent Delez, Christophe Grenard	Switzerland	4:42.558	
18	Elicer Orjuela Prada, Manuel Javier Tunjano	Colombia	4:47.152	
19	Damien Debeaupuits, Alexis Febvay	France	4:47.751	
20	Marek Moflar, Jiri Chyba	Czech Republic	4:52.229	
21	Nikolaos Manatakis, Nikolaos Koumpenakis	Greece	5:12.018	
22	Pablo Reinaldo Astoreca, Osvaldo De Bona	Argentina	5:17.520	
–	Przemyslaw Wegner, Arkadiusz Garczarek	Poland	DSQ	

==== Finals ====
Rank	Name	Nation	Time
Gold Medal Race
1st place, gold medalist(s)	Kieran Modra, Scott McPhee	Australia	4:21.327
2nd place, silver medalist(s)	Miguel Ángel Clemente Solano, Diego Javier Muñoz Sanchez	Spain	4:28.807
Bronze Medal Race
3rd place, bronze medalist(s)	Bryce Lindores, Sean Finning	Australia	4:26.516
4	Christian Venge Balboa, David Llaurado Caldero	Spain	4:28.642

== See also ==
- 2011 UCI Track Cycling World Championships – Men's individual pursuit
