= Cycling at the 2012 Summer Paralympics – Men's individual pursuit B =

Cycling, Men's Ind. Pursuit B at the XIV Paralympic Games
- Venue: ExCeL Exhibition Centre
- Dates: 30 August
- Competitors: 8 from 6 nations

Medalists
1st place, gold medalist(s)		Kieran Modra; Scott McPhee	Australia
2nd place, silver medalist(s)		Bryce Lindores; Sean Finning	Australia
3rd place, bronze medalist(s)		Miguel Angel Clemente Solano; Diego Javier Munoz	Spain

The Men's Individual Pursuit B track cycling event at the 2012 Summer Paralympics took place on 30 August at London Velopark. This class was for blind and visually impaired cyclists riding with a sighted pilot. Eight pairs from six different nations competed.

The competition began with four head to head races between the eight riders. These races were held over a 4000m course and each rider was given a time for their race. The fastest two riders were advanced to the gold medal final whilst the third and fourth fastest times raced it out for the bronze.

== Preliminaries ==
Q = Qualifier PR = Paralympic Record WR = World Record

Rank	Name	Country	Time
1	Kieran Modra; Pilot: Scott McPhee	Australia	4:18.752
2	Bryce Lindores; Pilot: Sean Finning	Australia	4:21.219
3	Miguel Angel Clemente Solano; Pilot: Diego Javier Munoz	Spain	4:24.539
4	James Brown; Pilot: Damien Shaw	Ireland	4:25.557
5	Christian Venge; Pilot: David Llaurado Caldero	Spain	4:27.997
6	Clark Rachfal; Pilot: David Swanson	United States	4:28.030
7	Daniel Chalifour; Pilot: Alexandre Cloutier	Canada	4:28.648
8	Alberto Lujan Nattkemper; Pilot: Jonatan Ithurrart	Argentina	5:09.568

== Finals ==
Gold medal match

Name	Time	Rank
Kieran Modra (AUS); Pilot: Scott McPhee (AUS)	4:17.756 WR	1st place, gold medalist(s)
Bryce Lindores (AUS); Pilot: Sean Finning (AUS)	4:22.269	2nd place, silver medalist(s)

Bronze medal match

Name	Time	Rank
Miguel Angel Clemente Solano (ESP); Pilot: Diego Javier Munoz (ESP)	4:24.015	3rd place, bronze medalist(s)
James Brown (IRL); Pilot: Damien Shaw (IRL)	4:26.075	4
