= Cycling at the 2012 Summer Paralympics – Men's individual pursuit =

The Men's individual pursuit events at the 2012 Summer Paralympics took place on 30 August–1 September at London Velopark.

== Classification ==
Cyclists are given a classification depending on the type and extent of their disability. The classification system allows cyclists to compete against others with a similar level of function. The class number indicates the severity of impairment with "1" being most impaired.

Pursuit cycling classes are:

- B: Blind and visually impaired cyclists use a Tandem bicycle with a sighted pilot on the front
- C 1-5: Cyclists with an impairment that affects their legs, arms and/or trunk but are capable of using a standard bicycle

== B ==
The men's 4 km individual pursuit (B) took place on 30 August.

Gold	Silver	Bronze
Kieran Modra; Pilot: Scott McPhee; Australia	Bryce Lindores; Pilot: Sean Finning; Australia	Miguel Ángel Clemente Solano; Pilot: Diego Javier Muñoz; Spain

== C1 ==
The men's 3 km individual pursuit (C1) took place on 31 August.

Gold	Silver	Bronze
Mark Lee Colbourne; Great Britain	Li Zhang Yu; China	Rodrigo Fernando Lopez; Argentina

== C2 ==
The men's 3 km individual pursuit (C2) took place on 31 August.

Gold	Silver	Bronze
Liang Guihua; China	Tobias Graf; Germany	Laurent Thirionet; France

== C3 ==
The men's 3 km individual pursuit (C3) took place on 31 August.

Gold	Silver	Bronze
Joseph Berenyi; United States	Shaun McKeown; Great Britain	Darren Kenny; Great Britain

== C4 ==
The men's 4 km individual pursuit (C4) took place on 1 September.

Gold	Silver	Bronze
Carol-Eduard Novak; Romania	Jiří Ježek; Czech Republic	Jody Cundy; Great Britain

== C5 ==
The men's 4 km individual pursuit (C5) took place on 1 September.

Gold	Silver	Bronze
Michael Gallagher; Australia	Jon-Allan Butterworth; Great Britain	Liu Xinyang; China
