= Cycling at the 2012 Summer Paralympics – Men's road time trial B =

Cycling, Men's road time trial B at the XIV Paralympic Games
- Venue: Brands Hatch
- Dates: September 5, 2012
- Competitors: 17 from 15 nations

Medalists
1st place, gold medalist(s)		Christian Venge; David Llaurado Caldero	Spain
2nd place, silver medalist(s)		Ivano Pizzi; Lucca Pizzi	Italy
3rd place, bronze medalist(s)		James Brown; Damien Shaw	Ireland

The Men's time trial B road cycling event at the 2012 Summer Paralympics took place on September 5 at Brands Hatch. Seventeen riders from fifteen different nations competed. The race distance was 24 km.

== Results ==
Rank	Name	Country	Time
1st place, gold medalist(s)	Christian Venge; Pilot: David Llaurado Caldero	Spain	30:48.25
2nd place, silver medalist(s)	Ivano Pizzi; Pilot: Lucca Pizzi	Italy	30:50.41
3rd place, bronze medalist(s)	James Brown; Pilot: Damien Shaw	Ireland	31:13.00
4	Daniel Chalifour; Pilot: Alexandre Cloutier	Canada	31:35.68
5	Damien Debeaupuits; Pilot: Alexis Febvay	France	31:38.75
6	Vladislav Janovjak; Pilot: Robert Mitosinka	Slovakia	31:38.83
7	Krzysztof Kosikowski; Pilot: Artur Korc	Poland	31:48.86
8	Clark Rachfal; Pilot: David Swanson	United States	31:53.97
9	Jarmo Ollanketo; Pilot: Marko Tormanen	Finland	32:07.15
10	Olivier Donval; Pilot: John Saccomandi	France	32:17.51
11	Miguel Angel Clemente Solano; Pilot: Diego Javier Munoz	Spain	32:20.57
12	Rinne Oost; Pilot: Patrick Bos	Netherlands	32:33.72
13	Bryce Lindores; Pilot: Sean Finning	Australia	33:12.27
14	Milan Petrovic; Pilot: Goran Smelcerovic	Serbia	34:20.76
15	Mohd Khairul Hazwan Wahab; Pilot: Khairul Naim Azhar	Malaysia	37:20.51
16	Alberto Lujan Nattkemper; Pilot: Jonatan Ithurrart	Argentina	38:23.82
17	Christos Stefanakis; Pilot: Konstantinos Troulinos	Greece	42:14.22
