= Cycling at the 2008 Summer Paralympics – Men's individual pursuit (B&VI 1–3) =

Men's individual pursuit (B&VI 1–3) at the XIII Paralympic Games
- Venue: Laoshan Velodrome
- Dates: September 7
- Competitors: 14 from 11 nations
- Winning time: 4:18.166

Medalists
1st place, gold medalist(s)		Kieran Modra & Tyson Lawrence	Australia
2nd place, silver medalist(s)		Christian Venge & David Llaurado	Spain
3rd place, bronze medalist(s)		Bryce Lindores & Steven George	Australia

The Men's individual pursuit (B&VI 1–3) at the 2008 Summer Paralympics took place on August 7 at the Laoshan Velodrome in Beijing, China.

== Preliminaries ==
In the preliminary round, Kieran Modra and Tyson Lawrence (Australia) broke their own world record, and the paralympic record set by Modra and his pilot at the 2004 Summer Paralympics, Robert Crowe.

Records prior to the preliminary round
PR	4:21.451	Kieran Modra (AUS); Pilot: Robert Crowe (AUS)	Athens (Greece)	September 19, 2004
WR	4:20.891	Kieran Modra (AUS); Pilot: Tyson Lawrence (AUS)	Bordeaux (France)	August 21, 2007

Q = Qualifier PR = Paralympic Record WR = World Record

Rank	Name	Time
1	Kieran Modra (AUS); Pilot: Tyson Lawrence (AUS)	4:18.961 Q WR
2	Christian Venge (ESP); Pilot: David Llaurado (ESP)	4:25.335 Q
3	Daniel Chalifour (CAN); Pilot: Alexandre Cloutier (CAN)	4:25.554 Q
4	Bryce Lindores (AUS); Pilot: Steven George (AUS)	4:27.578 Q
5	Brian Cowie (CAN); Pilot: Devon Smibert (CAN)	4:29.195
6	Gavin Kilpatrick (RSA); Pilot: Michael Thomson (RSA)	4:32.191
7	Vladislav Janovjak (SVK); Pilot: Robert Mitosinka (SVK)	4:32.236
8	Francisco Gonzalez (ESP); Pilot: Juan Francisco Suarez (ESP)	4:38.548
9	Alfred Stelleman (NED); Pilot: Jaco Tettelaar (NED)	4:40.432
10	Stephane Cote (CAN); Pilot: Pierre-Olivier Boily (CAN)	4:41.677
11	Olivier Donval (FRA); Pilot: John Saccomandi (FRA)	4:44.890
12	Carlos Arciniegas (COL); Pilot: Juan Carreno (COL)	4:47.730
13	Michael Delaney (IRL); Pilot: David Patrick Peelo (IRL)	4:49.911
14	Arnold Csaba Butu (ROU); Pilot: Lehel Rusza (ROU)	5:11.936

== Finals ==
The final rounds saw the world record broken again by Modra and Lawrence, this time taking 0.795 seconds off the time.

Records prior to the final
PR	4:18.961	Kieran Modra (AUS); Pilot: Tyson Lawrence (AUS)	Beijing (China)	September 7, 2008
WR	4:18.961	Kieran Modra (AUS); Pilot: Tyson Lawrence (AUS)	Beijing (China)	September 7, 2008

Gold medal match

Name	Time	Rank
Kieran Modra (AUS); Pilot: Tyson Lawrence (AUS)	4:18.166 WR	1
Christian Venge (ESP); Pilot: David Llaurado (ESP)	caught	1

Bronze medal match

Name	Time	Rank
Bryce Lindores (AUS); Pilot: Steven George (AUS)	4:26.626	1
Daniel Chalifour (CAN); Pilot: Alexandre Cloutier (CAN)	4:28.171	4
