= 2011 UCI Para-cycling Track World Championships =

- Venue: Montichiari, Italy
- Date: 11–13 March 2011
- Velodrome: Montichiari Velodrome
- Nations participating: 27
- Cyclists participating: over 230

The 2011 UCI Para-cycling Track World Championships were the World Championships for track cycling where athletes with a physical disability competed in 2011. The Championships took place at the Montichiari Velodrome in Montichiari, Italy from 11 to 13 March 2011.

== Classification ==
Sport class

- Cycling
  - C1 - locomotor disability: Neurological, or amputation
  - C2 - locomotor disability: Neurological, decrease in muscle strength, or amputation
  - C3 - locomotor disability: Neurological, or amputation
  - C4 - locomotor disability: Neurological, or amputation
  - C5 - locomotor disability: Neurological, or amputation
- Tandem
  - Tandem B - visual impairment

== Medal summary ==
Event	Class	Gold		Silver		Bronze	
Men's events
Sprint	Tandem B	Craig MacLean, Neil Fachie; United Kingdom		Barney Storey, Anthony Kappes; United Kingdom		Patrick Bos, Rinne Oost; Netherlands	
1000m time trial	C1	Rodrigo López; Argentina	1:19.991 WR	Chris Jaco Nel; South Africa	1:20.558	Jaye Miley; Canada	1:23.275
1000m time trial	C2	Gui Hua Liang; China	1:16.497 WR	Andrew Panazzolo; Australia	1:18.048	Tobias Graf; Germany	1:18.640
1000m time trial	C3	Darren Kenny; United Kingdom	1:11.293	Richard Waddon; United Kingdom	1:11.733	Amador Granados; Spain	1:12.985
1000m time trial	C4	Jody Cundy; United Kingdom	1:05.144 WR	Terry Byrne; United Kingdom	1:07.694	Jiří Bouška; Czech Republic	1:09.601
1000m time trial	C5	Jon-Allan Butterworth; United Kingdom	1:07.615 WR	Vincent Juarez; United States	1:08.872	Pablo Jaramillo Gallardo; Spain	1:09.108
1000m time trial	Tandem B	Craig MacLean, Neil Fachie; United Kingdom	1:02.659	Barney Storey, Anthony Kappes; United Kingdom	1:02.681	José Antonio Villanueva Trinidad, José Enrique Porto Lareo; Spain	1:04.350
3km pursuit	C1	Juan José Méndez; Spain	4:11.737	Chris Jaco Nel; South Africa	4:15.880	Rodrigo López; Argentina	2:04.550
3km pursuit	C2	Guihua Liang; China	3:51.514	Fabrizio Macchi; Italy	3:58.915	Michal Stark; Czech Republic	3:57.968
3km pursuit	C3	Darren Kenny; United Kingdom	3:43.156	Shaun McKeown; United Kingdom	3:46.769	Richard Waddon; United Kingdom	3:49.559
4km pursuit	C4	Jiří Ježek; Czech Republic	4:44.708	Jody Cundy; United Kingdom	4:51.919	Carol-Eduard Novak; Romania	
4km pursuit	C5	Michael Gallagher; Australia	4:41.423	Xinyang Liu; China	4:44.060	Yegor Dementyev; Ukraine	4:45.833
4km pursuit	Tandem B	Scott McPhee, Kieran Modra; Australia	4:21.327	Diego Javier Muñoz, Miguel Angel Clemente; Spain	4:28.807	Sean Finning, Bryce Lindores; Australia	4:26.516
Women's events
500m time trial	C1	Only one contestant in C1. No medals awarded.					
500m time trial	C2	Qi Tang; China	45.373	Bianbian Sun; China	45.412	Allison Jones; United States	46.276
500m time trial	C4	Jianping Ruan; China	39.359	Susan Powell; Australia	41.347	Yaping Ye; China	41.922
500m time trial	C5	Sarah Storey; United Kingdom	37.733	Ju Fang Zhou; China	38.506	Jennifer Schuble; United States	38.615
1000m time trial	Tandem B	Stephanie Morton, Felicity Johnson; Australia	1:09.393	Helen Scott, Aileen McGlynn; United Kingdom	1:09.474	Sonia Waddell, Jayne Parsons; New Zealand	1:11.835
3km pursuit	C1	Only one contestant in C1. No medals awarded.					
3km pursuit	C2	Allison Jones; United States	4:27.155	Raquel Acinas Poncelas; Spain	4:37.108	Qi Tang; China	
3km pursuit	C4	Susan Powell; Australia	4:09.367	Marie-Claude Molnar; Canada		Alexandra Green; Australia	
3km pursuit	C5	Sarah Storey; United Kingdom		Greta Neimanas; United States		Jennifer Schuble; United States	4:03.255
3km pursuit	Tandem B	Sonia Waddell, Jayne Parsons; New Zealand	3:39.376	Fiona Duncan, Lora Turnham; United Kingdom	3:41.450	Francine Meehan, Catherine Walsh; Ireland	3:42.730
Mixed events
Team sprint	C1–5	Terry Byrne, Jody Cundy, Darren Kenny; United Kingdom	49.540 WR	Xiaofei Ji, Zhang Lu, Yvan Chao Zheng; China	51.771	Jiří Bouška, Jiří Ježek, Tomáš Kvasnička; Czech Republic	52.290

== Medal table ==
Rank	Nation	Gold	Silver	Bronze	Total
1	Great Britain (GBR)	9	8	1	18
2	China (CHN)	4	4	2	10
3	Australia (AUS)	4	2	2	8
4	Spain (ESP)	1	2	3	6
4	United States (USA)	1	2	3	6
6	Czech Republic (CZE)	1	0	3	4
7	Argentina (ARG)	1	0	1	2
7	New Zealand (NZL)	1	0	1	2
9	South Africa (RSA)	0	2	0	2
10	Canada (CAN)	0	1	1	2
11	Italy (ITA)	0	1	0	1
12	Germany (GER)	0	0	1	1
12	Ireland (IRL)	0	0	1	1
12	Netherlands (NED)	0	0	1	1
12	Romania (ROM)	0	0	1	1
12	Ukraine (UKR)	0	0	1	1
Totals (16 entries)		22	22	22	66

== Participating nations ==
27 nations participated.

- Argentina
- Australia
- Austria
- Brazil
- Canada
- China
- Colombia
- Czech Republic
- Denmark
- France
- Germany
- Greece
- Ireland
- Italy
- Japan
- Netherlands
- New Zealand
- Poland
- Romania
- Russia
- Serbia
- South Africa
- Spain
- Switzerland
- Ukraine
- United Kingdom
- United States
