= Cycling at the 2008 Summer Paralympics – Men's individual pursuit (LC 1) =

Men's Individual Pursuit LC1 at the XIII Paralympic Games
- Paralympic Cycling (track)
- Venue: Laoshan Velodrome
- Dates: 8 September 2008
- Competitors: 15 from 12 nations

Medalists
1st place, gold medalist(s)		Michael Gallagher	Australia
2nd place, silver medalist(s)		Wolfgang Sacher	Germany
3rd place, bronze medalist(s)		Fabio Triboli	Italy

The Men's individual pursuit LC1 track cycling event at the 2008 Summer Paralympics was competed on 8 September. It was won by Michael Gallagher, representing Australia.

== Qualifying ==
Qualified for gold medal race
Qualified for bronze medal race

8 September 2008, 09:30

Rank	Athlete	Time	Notes
1	Michael Gallagher (AUS)	4:40.65	PR
2	Wolfgang Sacher (GER)	4:44.38	
3	Fabio Triboli (ITA)	4:46.90	
4	Soelito Gohr (BRA)	4:50.11	
5	Cathal Gustavus Miller (IRL)	4:53.97	
6	Manfred Gattringer (AUT)	4:54.72	
7	Pierpaolo Addesi (ITA)	4:58.19	
8	Wolfgang Eibeck (AUT)	4:58.89	
9	Ivan Renggli (SUI)	5:06.91	
10	David Mercier (FRA)	5:08.64	
11	Damien Severi (FRA)	5:10.59	
12	Mark Breton (CAN)	5:12.36	
13	Zhang Kuidong (CHN)	5:12.67	
14	Kennedy Jacome (COL)	5:16.90	
15	Ioannis Kalaitzakis (GRE)	5:20.03	

== Final round ==
8 September 2008, 15:20

Gold

Rank	Athlete	Time	Notes
1st place, gold medalist(s)	Michael Gallagher (AUS)	4:43.28	
2nd place, silver medalist(s)	Wolfgang Sacher (GER)	4:46.79	

Bronze

Rank	Athlete	Time	Notes
3rd place, bronze medalist(s)	Fabio Triboli (ITA)	4:45.68	
4	Soelito Gohr (BRA)	4:53.41	
