= Kerry Golding =

Australian tandem cycling pilot

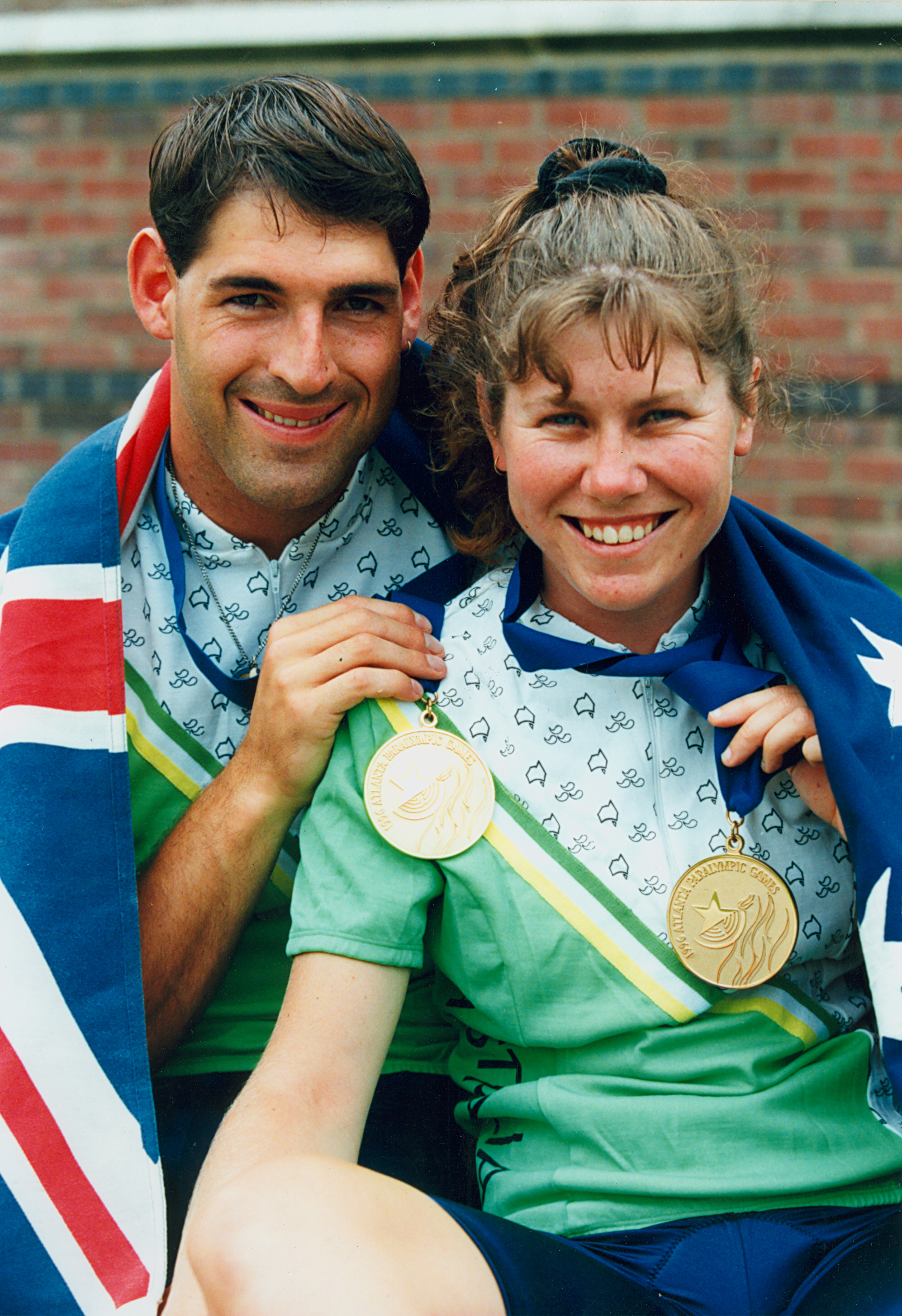
- Kieran Modra (left) and his wife and pilot Kerry Modra in 2008 showing the gold medal that they won in the 200 m sprint event at the 1996 Atlanta Paralympics

Personal information
- Full name: Kerry Joan Modra
- Nationality: Australia
- Born: Kerry Joan Golding; 27 November 1973 (age 52) Nowra, New South Wales
- Spouse: Kieran Modra (m. 1997; died 2019)
Medal record
Women's para-cycling
Representing Australia
Paralympic Games
Gold medal – first place	1996 Atlanta	Mixed 200 m Sprint Tandem open
UCI Para-cycling Track World Championships
Gold medal – first place	1998 Colorado Springs	Mixed Tandem Sprint B
Gold medal – first place	1998 Colorado Springs	Mixed Tandem Time Trial B
Gold medal – first place	1998 Colorado Springs	Mixed Tandem Individual Pursuit B

Kerry Joan Modra OAM (née Golding; born 27 November 1973) is an Australian Paralympic tandem cycling pilot. She was born in the New South Wales city of Nowra. She was introduced to Kieran Modra, a visually impaired cyclist, at a friend's 21st birthday party. He convinced her to take up cycling; she had only played netball before then. She became Modra's pilot, and six months later, she won a gold medal with him at the 1996 Atlanta Games in the Mixed 200 m Sprint Tandem open event, for which she received a Medal of the Order of Australia.

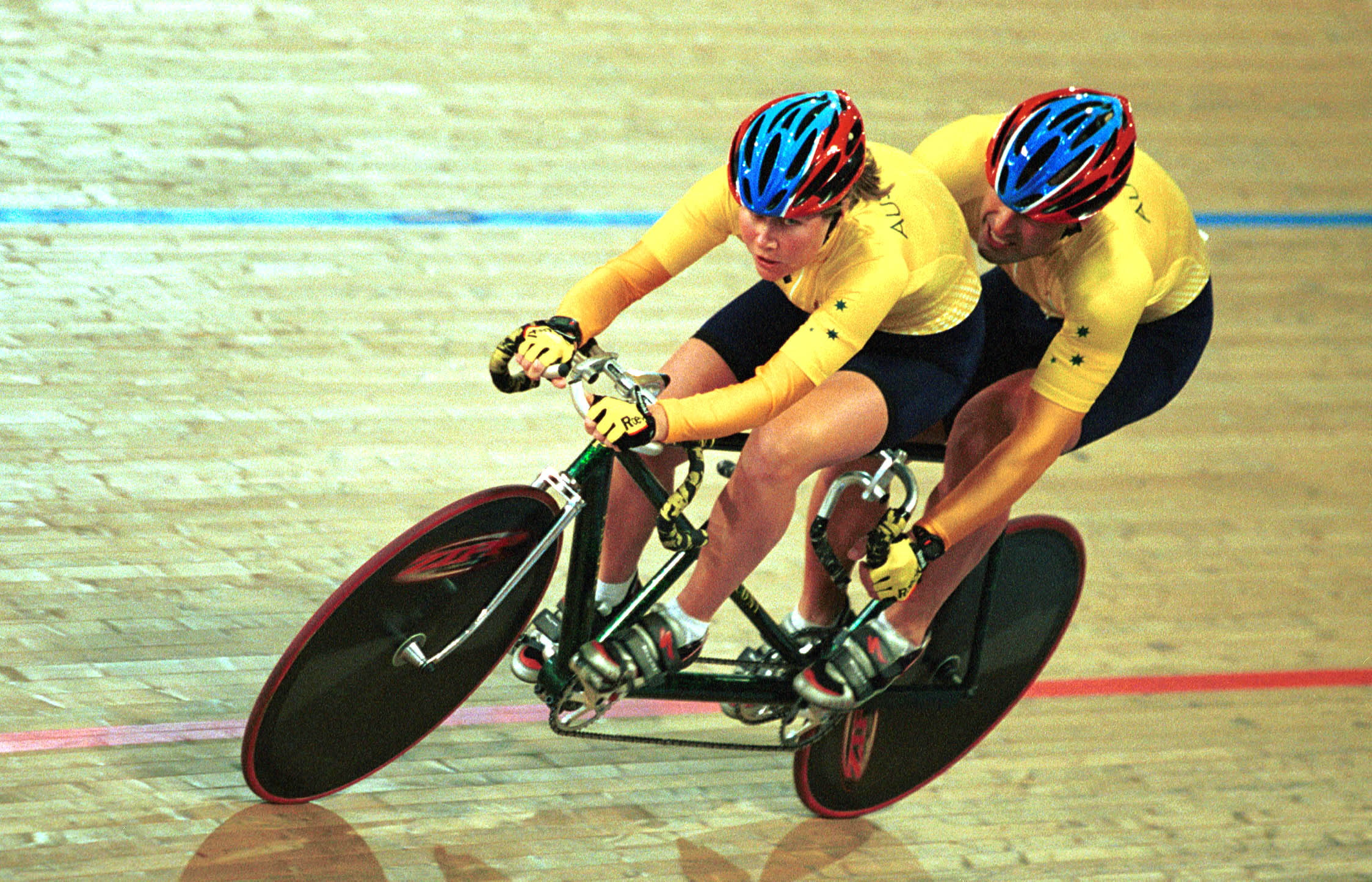
Action shot of Kerry Modra (pilot, shown front) with her cycling partner and husband Kieran Modra during the 1 km Time Trial at the 2000 Summer Paralympics

She was married to Modra from May 1997 until his death in 2019, and they had three daughters. As Kieran's pilot at the 1998 UCI Para-cycling Track World Championships in Colorado Springs, she won gold medals in the Mixed Tandem Sprint B, Mixed Tandem Time Trial B and Mixed Individual Pursuit B. At the 2000 Sydney Games, she did not win any medals. At the games, she was pregnant with the couple's first child, and fainted due to low blood pressure during a quarter-final sprint race; she was replaced as Kieran's pilot by his sister Tania for the rest of the games. In 2000, she received an Australian Sports Medal.
