= Tania Modra =

Australian Paralympic tandem pilot

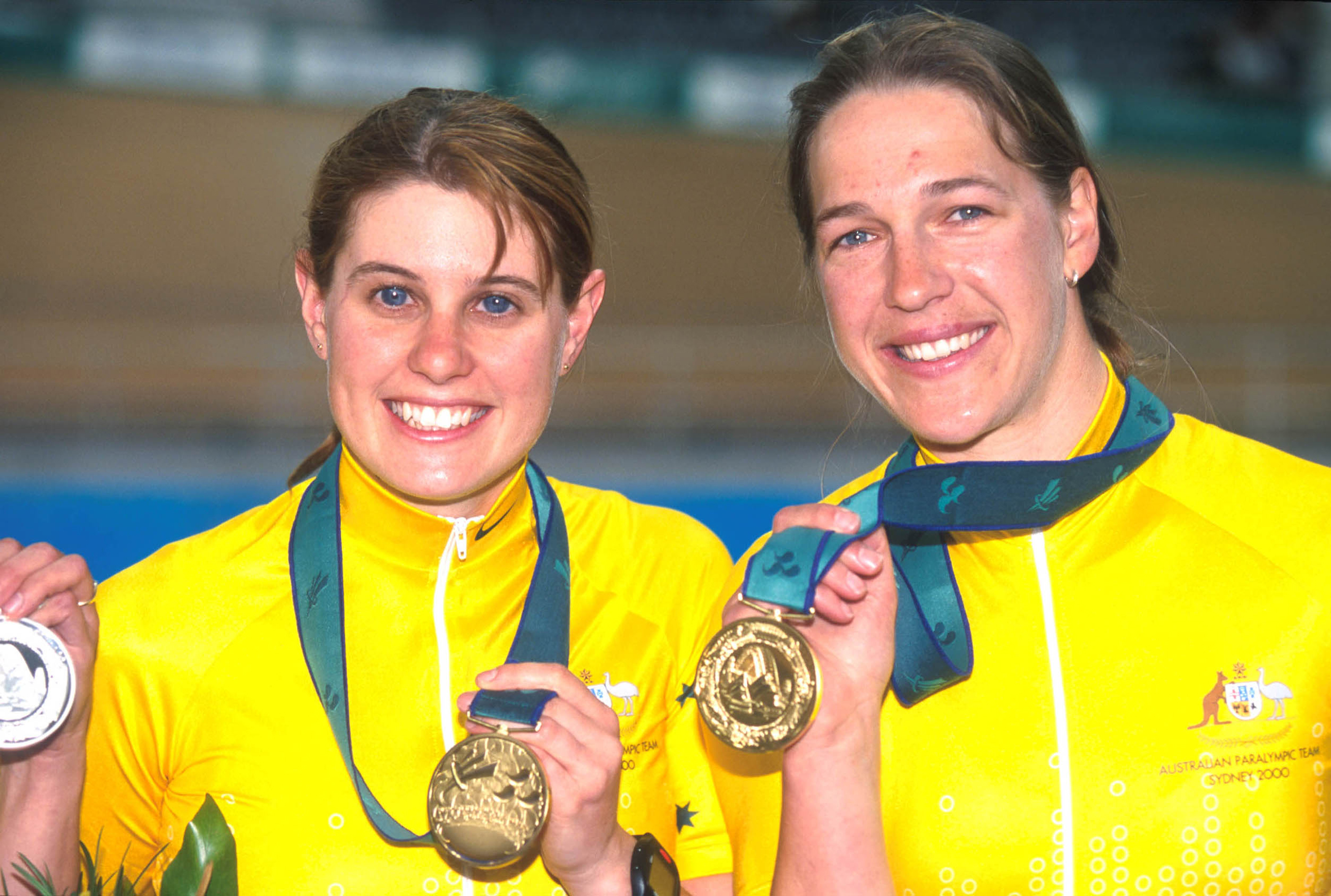
- Modra (shown right) and her cycling partner Sarnya Parker (left) with their gold medals won at the 2000 Summer Paralympics

Personal information
- Full name: Tania Modra
- Nationality: Australia
- Born: 14 January 1975 (age 51) Port Lincoln, South Australia
Medal record
Women's cycling
Representing Australia
Paralympic Games
Gold medal – first place	2000 Sydney	1 km Time Trial Tandem open
Gold medal – first place	2000 Sydney	Individual Pursuit Tandem open

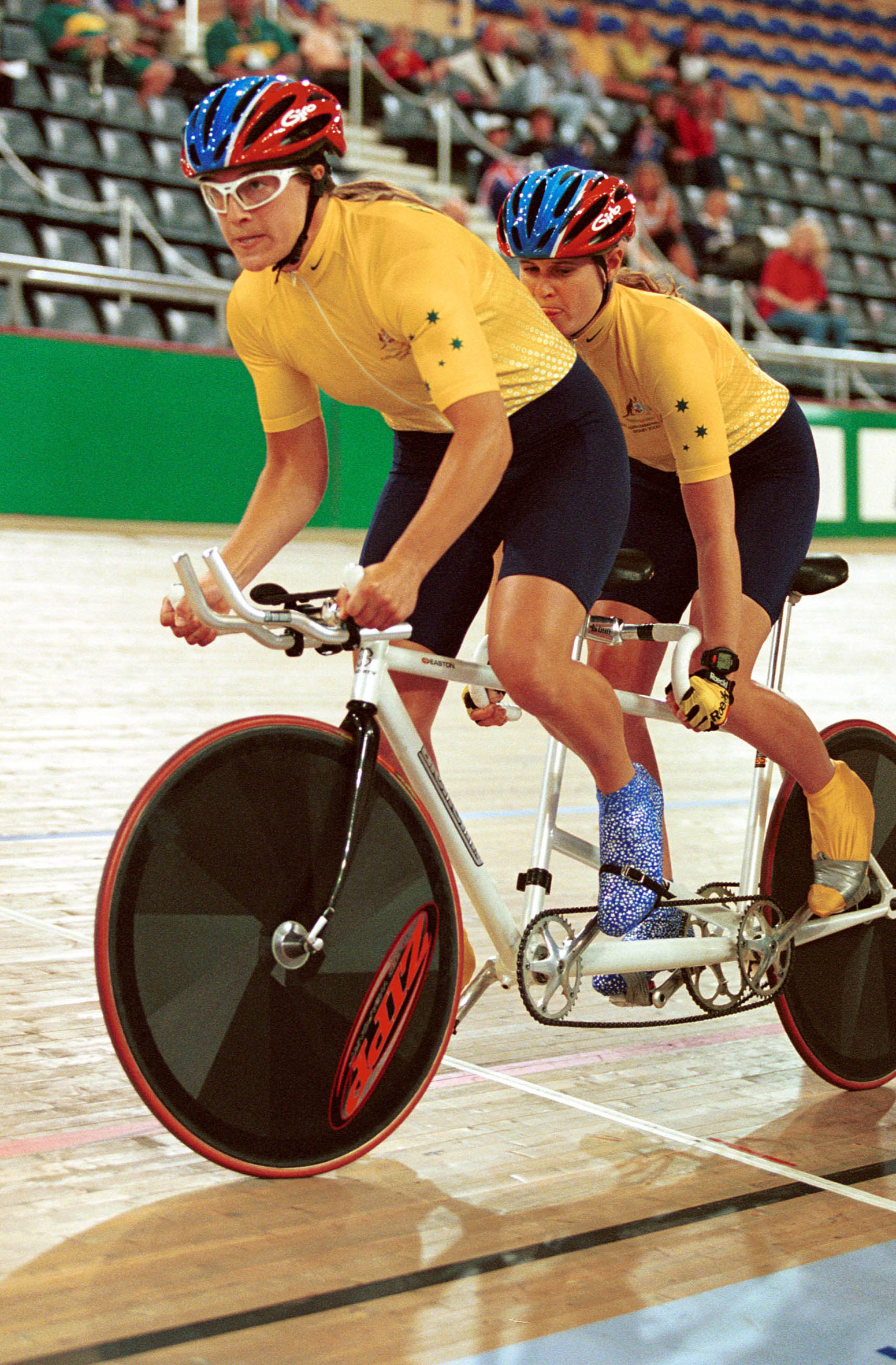
Action shot of Tania Modra (pilot) and Sarnya Parker on their way to winning gold in the 2000 Summer Paralympics Women's Tandem 1 km Time Trial

Tania Modra, OAM (born 14 January 1975) is an Australian Paralympic tandem cycling pilot and two-time gold medalist at the 2000 Paralympics.

== Early life and education ==
She was born on 14 January 1975 in the South Australian town of Port Lincoln, grew up on a farm in Green Patch (part of the District Council of Lower Eyre Peninsula), about 20 kilometres (12 mi) north of Port Lincoln. Her father was a sheep farmer and the owner of Thistle Island, which he sold in the 1980s. Her parents, Theo and Sylvia, had three sons in addition to her.

Together with her brothers, she attended Immanuel College in Adelaide. Tania later attended Port Lincoln High School, where she set junior records in the U14 category for the 200 and 800 meters, as well as in the U15 category for 800 meters. In her free time, she also practiced tennis, volleyball, aikido, and water sports.

== Career ==
Eighteen months before the 2000 Sydney Games, her brother, visually impaired Paralympic tandem cyclist Kieran Modra, introduced her to tandem cyclist Sarnya Parker, and Tania became Sarnya's pilot. Neither Tania nor Parker had experience in competitive cycling. During this period, they trained for about 22 hours a week while also working professionally. Aside from training they also needed to compete to qualify for the Games. They won 5 gold medals at the Southern Cross Games and 3 gold medals at the 2000 Australian National Championship.

She won two gold medals at the Sydney Paralympics with Parker in the Women's 1 km Time Trial Tandem open and Women's Individual Pursuit Tandem open events, the pair broke the world record in both events. At the 2000 Games, she also piloted her brother Kieran after his wife Kerry, who was pregnant with the couple's first child, had fainted due to low blood pressure during a quarter-final sprint race.

In 2001, she also had a very successful performance at the European Championships in Switzerland, where she and Parker won all the events they participated in, including four track events and the road time trial.

== Awards and honours ==
In 2000, shortly after the Olympics, Australia Post issued stamps featuring the gold medal-winning tandem team.

In January 2001, she was awarded the Medal of the Order of Australia (OAM). In June 2001, she received the Sportsperson of the Year award from a local Rotary Club.
