= James Brown (cyclist) =

Paralympic athlete and activist

Personal information
- Nationality: British
- Born: 8 October 1964 (age 62) Portaferry, Northern Ireland

Sport
- Country: Ireland (since 2009)
- Sport: Cycling
Medal record
Men's athletics
Representing United Kingdom
Paralympic Games
Gold medal – first place	1984 New York	800 m B3
Gold medal – first place	1984 New York	1500 m B3
Men's cycling
Representing Ireland
Paralympic Games
Bronze medal – third place	2012 London	Road Time Trial B

James Brown (born 8 October 1964) is a former Northern Irish paralympic-cyclist, who competed for Great Britain, Ireland, and Northern Ireland. He is visually impaired and participated in five Paralympic Games in various sports. Brown earned two gold medals at the 1984 Summer Paralympics in athletics and a bronze medal at the 2012 Summer Paralympics in the men's road time trial with sighted pilot Damien Shaw.

== Paralympic career ==
Brown is visually impaired from birth and began cycling at the age of five and running at the age of 13 while attending the Royal National College for the Blind. Following instruction in skiing, he joined the British Paralympic Team for the 1982 Disabled Alpine World Championships. He later worked at the Royal National College for the Blind as a volunteer guide runner, including at the World Youth Games for the Disabled.

At the 1984 Summer Paralympics in New York City, Brown won two gold medals in athletics for Great Britain in the 800-metre and 1500-metre. He later participated in several other editions of the Summer and Winter Paralympics in other events, including cross-country skiing and the biathlon.

Brown planned to enter the 2008 Paralympic Games as a cyclist, but missed the games because of an injury. The following year, he joined the Irish team and began his partnership with sighted pilot Damien Shaw in 2011. At the 2012 Paralympic Games, Brown and Shaw won a bronze medal in the men's road time trial B. The pair had also finished fourth in the men's individual pursuit B and ninth in the men's 1 km time trial B.

He later represented Northern Ireland at the 2014 Commonwealth Games, partnering with Dave Readle in the men's tandem sprint B and men's tandem time trial B, finishing fifth in both events. Brown was banned from competition from 2016 to 2018 by Sport Ireland and Cycling Ireland for violating anti-doping rules, to which he admitted.

== Personal life ==
Brown retired from sport in 2015 and joined Mobiloo, a social enterprise that aims to provide portable toilets that are accessible for the disabled. He has since participated in several Extinction Rebellion protests and has been arrested several times for non-violent civil disobedience; he has cited his daughter for inspiring his climate change activism. On 10 October 2019, he climbed on the fuselage of a British Airways plane at London City Airport as part of Extinction Rebellion's takeover of the airport. At a subsequent court hearing, he denied the charge of causing a public nuisance and was granted conditional bail by a district judge that barred him from being within one mile (1.6 km) of an airport. On 28 July 2021, following a trial at Southwark Crown Court, Brown was convicted of causing a public nuisance. Presiding judge Gregory Perrins set a sentencing hearing for 17 September. On 24 September 2021, he was given a prison term of one year. In February 2022, Brown was found guilty of aggravated trespass after he climbed on top of a High Speed 2 drilling rig in February 2020.
