= Michael Gallagher (cyclist) =

Australian-Scottish Paralympic cyclist

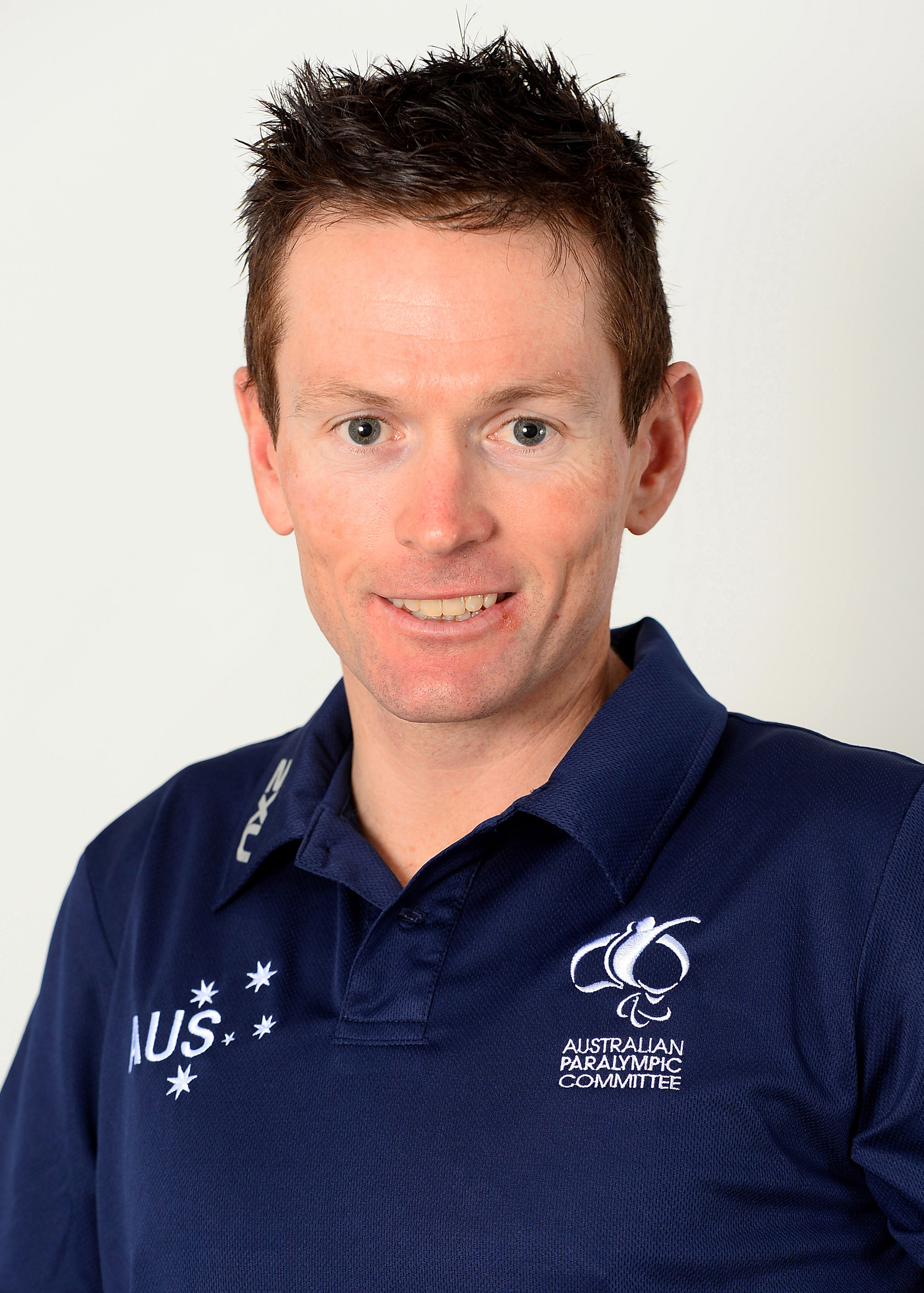
- 2016 Australian Paralympic team portrait of Gallagher

Personal information
- Full name: Michael Thomas Gallagher
- Nationality: Australian
- Born: 14 December 1978 (age 47) Scotland

Sport
- Sport: Track and road cycling
- Disability: Erb's palsy
- Disability class: C5
- Club: Carnegie Caulfield Cycling Club
Medal record
Men's para-cycling
Representing Australia
Paralympic Games
Gold medal – first place	2008 Beijing	Individual Pursuit LC1
Gold medal – first place	2012 London	Individual Pursuit C5
Bronze medal – third place	2008 Beijing	Individual Road Race LC1-2/CP4
Bronze medal – third place	2012 London	Individual Road Time Trial C5
IPC World Championships
UCI Para-cycling Track World Championships
Gold medal – first place	2006 Aigle	Men's 1k Time Trial LC1
Gold medal – first place	2006 Aigle	Men's 4k Individual Pursuit
Gold medal – first place	2007 Bordeaux	Men's 1 km Time Trial LC1
Gold medal – first place	2007 Bordeaux	Men's 4 km Individual Pursuit LC1
Gold medal – first place	2009 Manchester	Men's 4 km Time Trial LC1
Gold medal – first place	2011 Montichiari	Men's 4 km Individual Pursuit C5
Gold medal – first place	2012 Carson	Men's 4 km Individual Pursuit C4/C5
Gold medal – first place	2014 Aguascalientes	Men's 4 km Individual Pursuit C4
Gold medal – first place	2015 Appledorn	Men's 4 km Individual Pursuit C5
Gold medal – first place	2016 Montichiari	Men's 4 km Individual Pursuit C5
Bronze medal – third place	2012 Carson	Men's Scratch Race C4/C5
Bronze medal – third place	2015 Appledorn	Men's 15km Scratch Race
UCI Para-cycling Road World Championships
Gold medal – first place	2013 Baie-Comeau	Men's Road Race C5
Silver medal – second place	2009 Italy	Men's Road Time Trial LC1
Silver medal – second place	2010 Canada	Men's Road Time Trial C5
Silver medal – second place	2011 Denmark	Men's Road Time Trial C5

Michael Thomas Gallagher, OAM (born 14 December 1978) is an Australian Paralympic cyclist from Scotland. He has won gold medals at the Beijing and 2012 London Paralympics. He was selected in the Australian team for the 2016 Rio Paralympics. The Australian Sports Anti-Doping Agency (ASADA) revealed that Gallagher had returned a positive A sample for erythropoietin (EPO) in an out-of-competition training camp in Italy in July 2016. This A positive disqualified him from the Rio Paralympics.

== Personal ==
Gallagher was born on 14 December 1978 in Scotland and moved to Australia as a five-year-old. He has Erb's palsy in his right shoulder, due to an accident at birth. He lives in Melbourne and runs a construction business.

== Cycling ==
Gallagher is a C5 classified track and road cyclist. He started cycling with a family friend when he was twenty-five years old, and then started taking the sport more seriously. He cycles for Carnegie Caulfield Cycling Club, is affiliated with the Victorian Institute of Sport and is coached by Hilton Clarke Senior. He first represented Australia in 2005 at the IPC European Championships. His cycling is sponsored by Victorian Institute of Sport (VIS), Bianchi, 2XU and CSM Cycles.

He was part of the Australian team at the 2005 IPC European Championships, the 2006 and 2007 Para-cycling World Championships, and the 2009, 2011 and 2012 Para-cycling Track World Championships. I He has also participated in road-racing competitions, including the 2009 Para-cycling Road World Championships and the 2011 Para-cycling Road World Cup in Australia.

At the 2008 Beijing Games, he won a gold medal in the Men's Individual Pursuit LC1 event, for which he received a Medal of the Order of Australia, and a bronze medal in the Men's Individual Road Race LC1–2/CP4 event. At the 2012 London Paralympics, he participated in the Men's Road Race C4–5, Men's Time Trial C5, Men's Individual Pursuit C5 and the Mixed Team Sprint C1–5 events – winning a gold medal in the Individual Pursuit C5 and a bronze medal in the Time Trial C5.

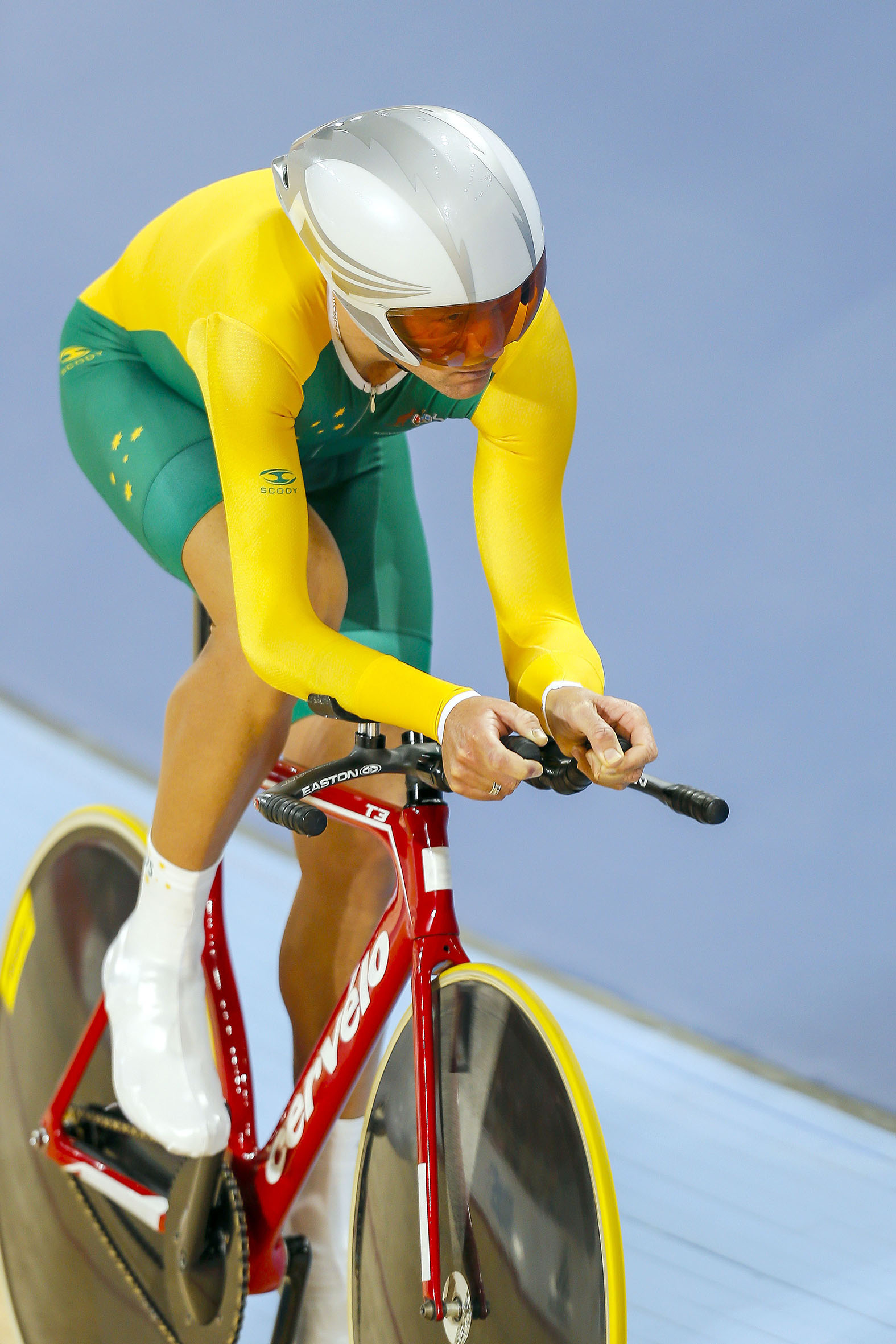
Gallagher at the 2012 London Paralympics

Competing at the 2013 UCI Para-cycling Road World Championships in Baie-Comeau, Canada, he won a gold medal in the Men's Road Race C5. At the 2014 UCI Para-cycling Track World Championships in Aguascalientes, Mexico, he won the gold medal in the Men's 4 km Individual Pursuit C4. He broke the world record with a time of 4minutes and 24.057 seconds in the qualifying.

At the 2015 UCI Para-cycling Track World Championships in Appledorn, Netherlands, he won the gold medal in the Men's 4 km Individual Pursuit C5 and a bronze medal in the 15 km Scratch Race C5.

Competing at the 2015 UCI Para-cycling Road World Championships in Nottwil, Switzerland, he finished tenth in the Men's Time Trial C5 and fifth in the Men's Road Race C5.

At the 2016 UCI Para-cycling Track World Championships in Montichiari, Italy, he defended his Men's 4 km Individual Pursuit C5 title by defeating fellow Australian Alistair Donohoe.

In 2016, he was a Victorian Institute of Sport scholarship holder.

In 2016 he was found to have tested positive for the banned substance EPO and removed from the Australian Paralympic team for Rio 2016 Paralympics.

In 2023 he was part of Team HKL/ROKiTs WTRL APAC Open Shield A1 winning squad. He competed with Matt Sherwin (the 40yearpro) prior to his debut at the 2026 Tour of Magnificent Qinghai.

== Recognition ==
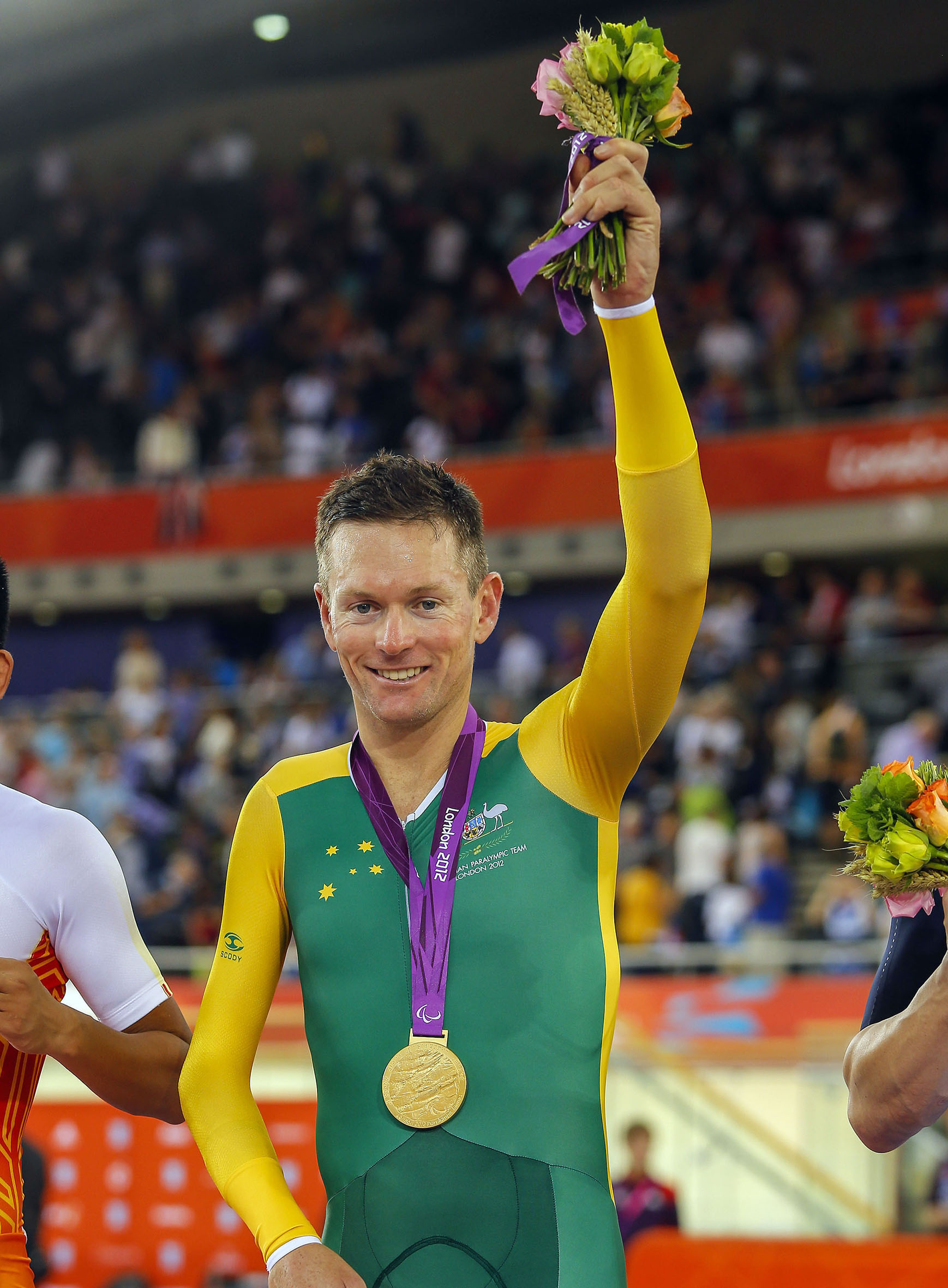
Gallagher gold medallist at the 2012 London Paralympics

Gallagher was named the Victorian Athlete of the Year with a Disability in 2006 and 2007. He was one of the top three finalists for the Australian Sportsperson of the Year with a Disability award in 2006 and the Victorian Institute of Sport Award of Excellence in 2007. He also received the Victorian Institute of Sport Coaches Award for Cycling in 2006. In 2006, 2007, 2009 and 2010, he was named the Cycling Australia Male Para-cyclist of the Year. In 2008, he was one of eighty Australians to participate in the 2008 Summer Olympics torch relay. In November 2013, he was named Cycling Australia's Elite Male Para-Cyclist of the Year.
