= Tyson Lawrence =

Australian Paralympic tandem cycling pilot

Personal information
- Full name: Tyson John Lawrence
- Nationality: Australia
- Born: 9 June 1978 (age 48)

Sport
- Club: Australia
Medal record
Cycling
Paralympic Games
Gold medal – first place	2008 Beijing	Men's Individual Pursuit B VI 1-3
Bronze medal – third place	2008 Beijing	Men's 1 km Time Trial B VI 1-3

Tyson John Lawrence, OAM (born 9 June 1978) is an Australian Paralympic tandem cycling pilot, who worked with Kieran Modra at the 2008 Beijing Games. At the games, he won a gold medal in the Men's Individual Pursuit B VI 1-3 event, for which he received a Medal of the Order of Australia, and a bronze medal in the Men's 1 km Time Trial B VI 1-3 event.
