= Damien Shaw =

Irish cyclist

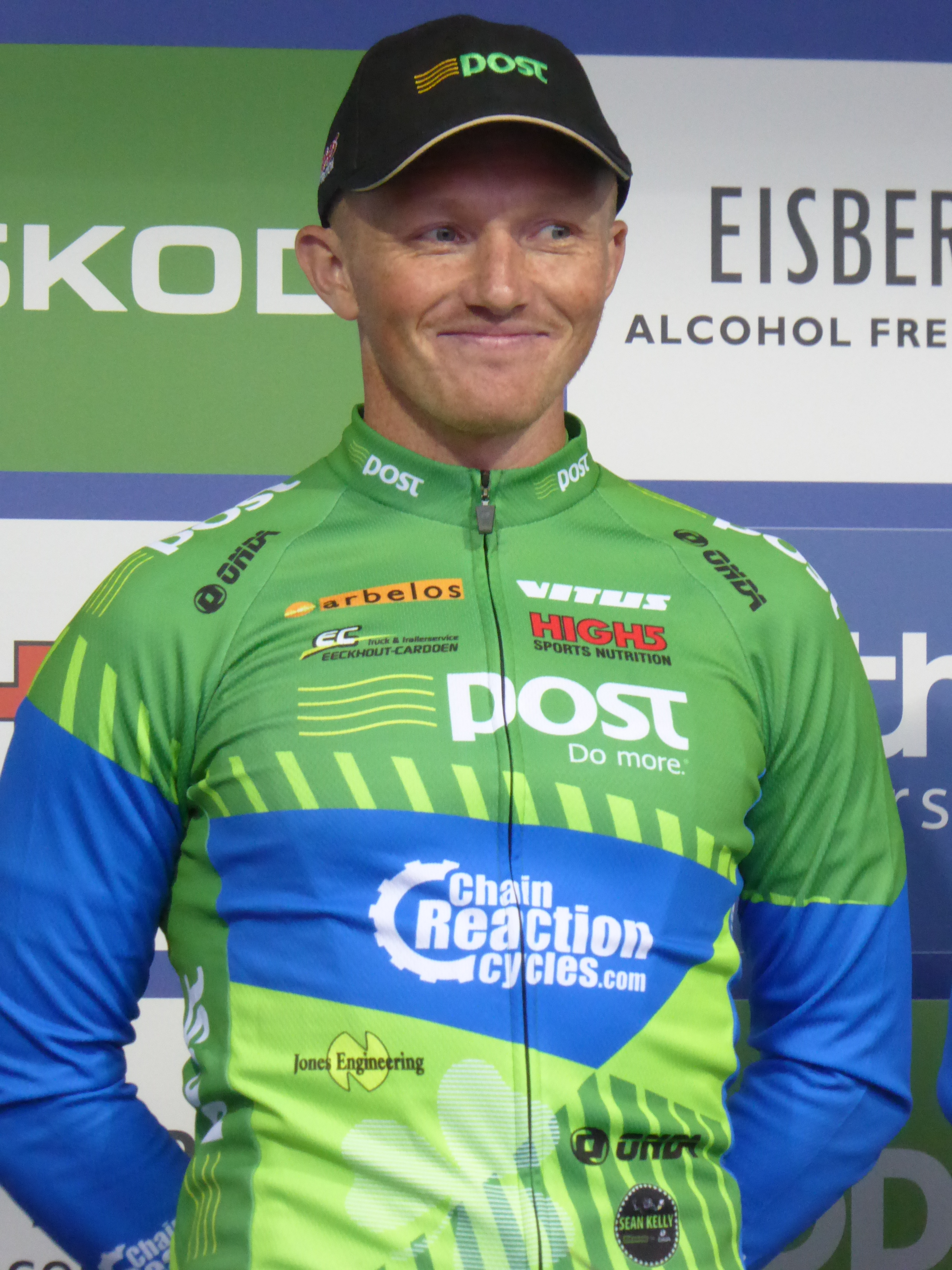
- Shaw at the 2016 Tour of Britain

Personal information
- Born: 10 July 1984 (age 42) Mullingar, Republic of Ireland

Cycling career
- Sport: Cycling
- Current team: Retired
- Discipline: Road
- Role: Rider

Amateur teams
- 2011–2012: Lakeside Wheelers CC
- 2013–2014: Aquablue
- 2015: Team Asea
- 2019: Strata 3–VeloRevolution

Professional teams
- 2016–2017: An Post–Chain Reaction
- 2018: Holdsworth

Damien Shaw (born 10 July 1984) is a retired Irish road racing cyclist who rode professionally for An Post–Chain Reaction and Holdsworth. He was the 2015 Irish National Road Race Champion and won a stage on the UCI Europe Tour at the 2017 Tour du Loir et Cher.

== Career ==
Shaw was a tandem pilot at the 2011 UCI Para-cycling Track World Championships and the 2012 Summer Paralympics, winning a bronze medal in 2012 in the road time trial B with James Brown.

He was the Irish National Road Race Champion in 2015, finishing one minute and two seconds ahead of future Grand Tour stage winner Eddie Dunbar. Shaw also finished third in the 2013 edition of the race, and had four second-place finishes in the National Championship Criterium race.

Prior to turning professional in 2016, Shaw worked as a firefighter and combined this with his cycling training. After spells with Lakeside Wheelers and Aquablue, he was riding with Team ASEA Louth when he won the Irish Road Race Championship. He also competed for Louth at the 2015 An Post Rás where he won the County Rider classification.

The second and final victory of his career came on the UCI Europe Tour at the 2017 Tour du Loir et Cher riding for Irish professional team An Post–Chain Reaction. Shaw was victorious on stage one and held the race lead until the end of stage four. He finished the race in sixth place, within a minute of winner Alexander Kamp and twelve seconds behind fourth-placed finisher and future Tour de France winner Jonas Vingegaard.

== Major results ==
2011
2nd Criterium, National Road Championships
2012
2nd Criterium, National Road Championships
2013
3rd Road race, National Road Championships
2014
2nd Criterium, National Road Championships
2015
1st Road race, National Road Championships
1st County rider classification Rás Tailteann
2016
5th Overall Rás Tailteann
2017
5th Overall Rás Tailteann
6th Overall Tour du Loir-et-Cher

1st Stage 1

2018
2nd Criterium, National Road Championships
4th Overall Rás Tailteann
