= Scott McPhee =

Australian cyclist (born 1992)

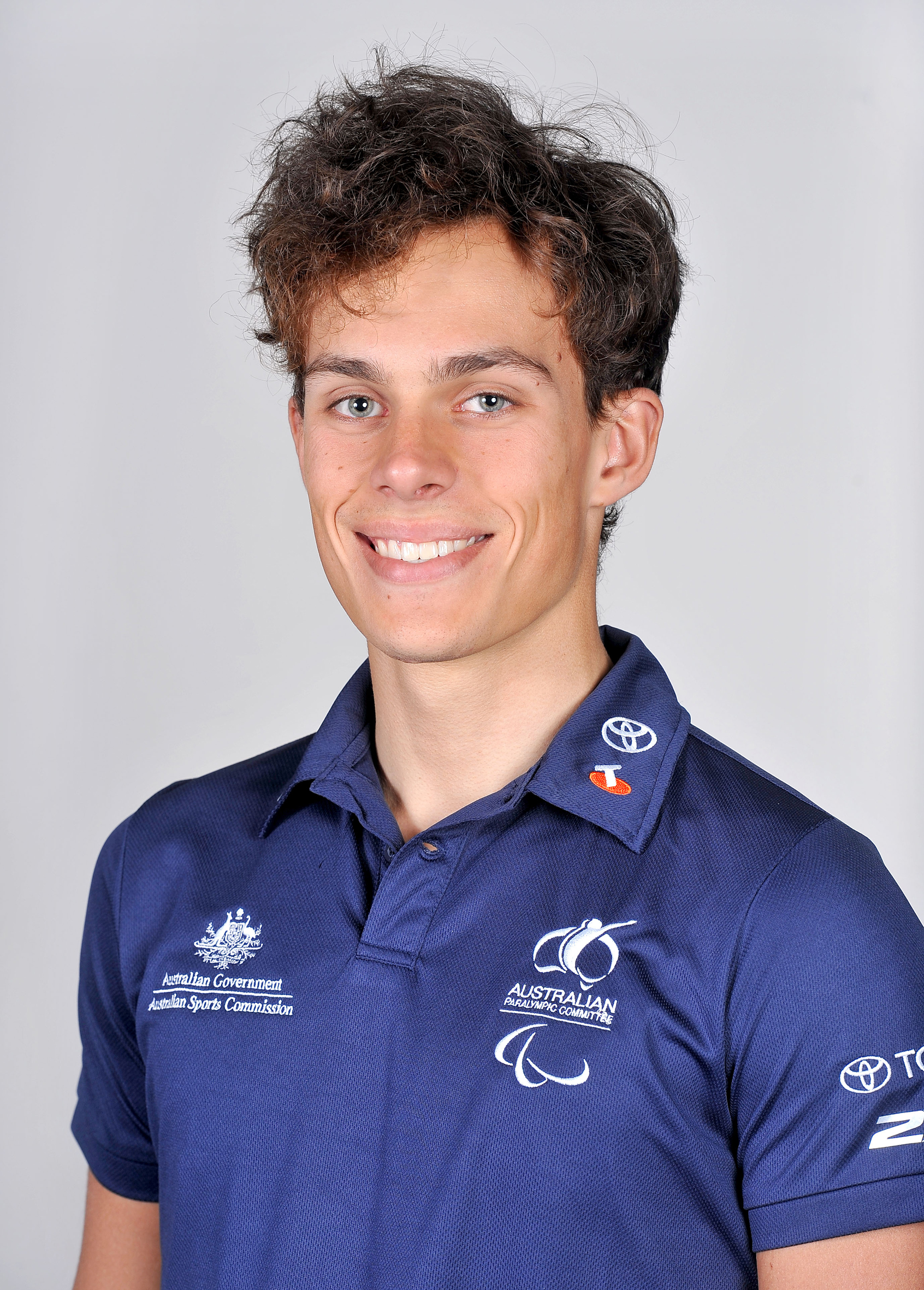
- 2012 Australian Paralympic team portrait of McPhee

Personal information
- Full name: Scott Matthew McPhee
- Nickname: Scotty
- Nationality: Australian
- Born: 2 January 1992 (age 34) Adelaide, Australia
- Height: 1.80 m (5 ft 11 in)
- Weight: 73 kg (161 lb)

Sport
- Country: Australia
- Sport: Cycling
- Events: Individual road race (Pilot); Individual pursuit (Pilot); Individual time trial (Pilot); 1 km Time trial (Pilot)
- Club: Central Districts
- Team: PCT-Tomacc
- Coached by: Kevin McIntosh

Achievements and titles
- Paralympic finals: 2012
- World finals: 2011/2012
- Highest world ranking: 1st
Medal record
Men's para-cycling
Representing Australia
Paralympic Games
Gold medal – first place	2012 London	Individual pursuit B

Scott Matthew McPhee, OAM (born 2 January 1992) is an Australian cyclist, who piloted Kieran Modra in tandem cycling. He won a gold medal with Modra at the 2012 London Paralympics.

== Personal ==
McPhee was born in Adelaide on 2 January 1992. He grew up in the Adelaide suburb of Wayville. He attended West Lakes Shore Primary School and completed high school at Prince Alfred College. He studied a Bachelor of Law at the University of Adelaide and a Bachelor of Civil Engineering at the University of South Australia.. Scott has worked as civil engineer at Acciona and presently works as a civil engineer at Australian Rail Track Corporation (ARTC).

== Cycling ==
In 2010, McPhee competed in the Rendition Homes Teams Series as a member of the South Australian Institute of Sport team. He won the Green Sprinters Jersey in the same event in 2011 riding for Team Bike Station Watermark and again in 2013 riding for Team Mcniell Logistics.

McPhee served as sighted pilot for visually impaired athlete Kieran Modra in tandem racing. At the 2011 Paracycling Track World Championships in Montichiari Italy the pair won the 4 km tandem pursuit in world record time. Throughout the year the pair had numerous results in Europe on the track and road including a bronze in the Segovia, Spain World cup road time trial. He also piloted for Modra at the 2011 UCI Para-cycling Road World Championships in Copenhagen however as favourites for the road time trial the pair returned home early when Kieran suffered a broken collarbone in a training accident prior to the event.

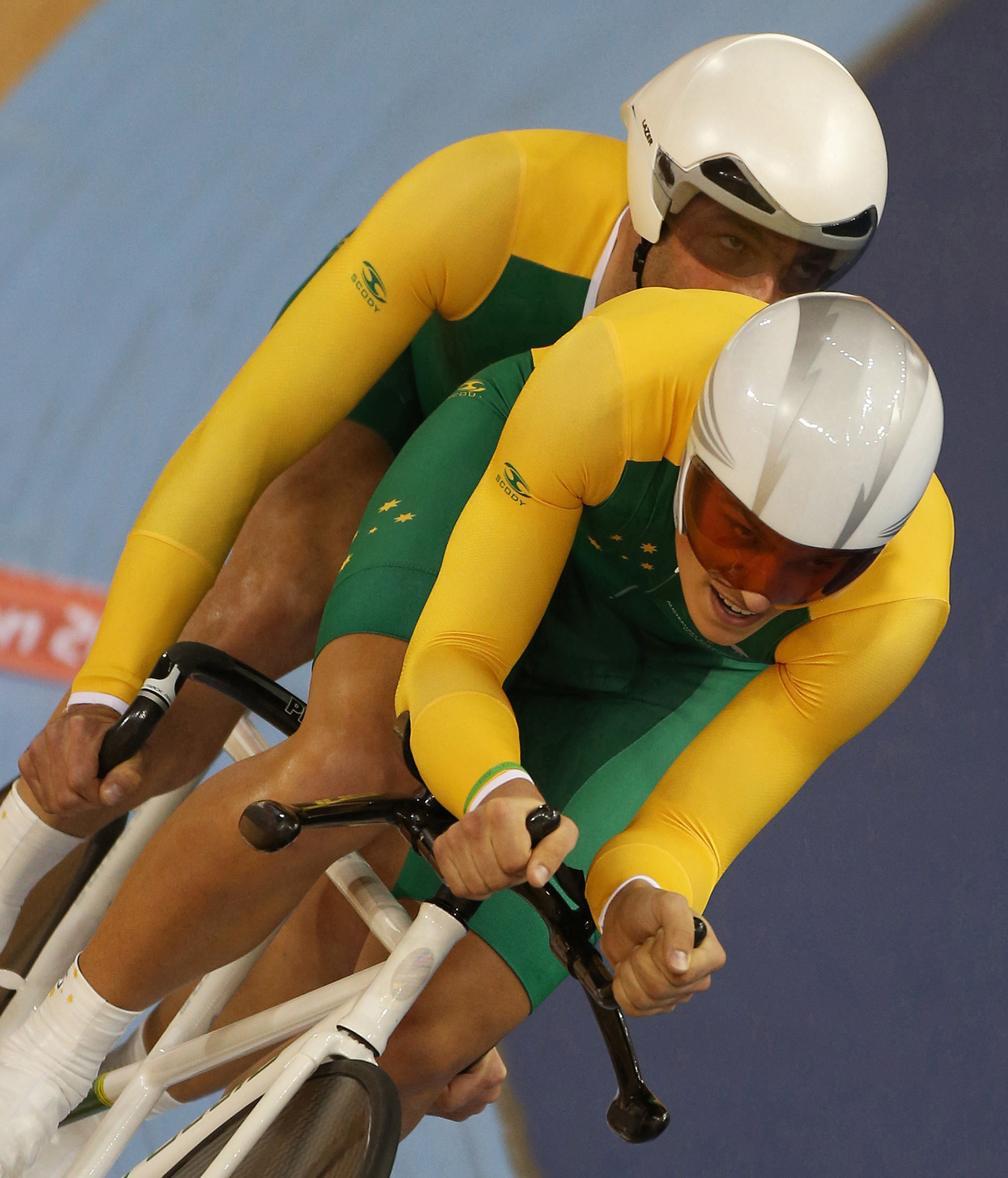
Kieran Modra and his pilot Scott McPhee at the 2012 London Paralympics

McPhee partnered with Bryce Lindores at the 2012 Paracycling Track World Championships. Modra had suffered severe injuries in late 2011 preventing him from competing at the titles; McPhee was asked to aid by piloting Lindores whose regular pilot was unavailable for the competition. The pair won the 4 km tandem pursuit defending back to back titles for Scott and securing Bryce's first title. Leading into the 2012 London Paralympics, McPhee was an integral part of Modra's rehabilitation back onto the bike in a bid to have him ready to compete. At the Games, he won a gold medal in the Men's 4 km Tandem Pursuit with Modra and secured a new world record time for the event. Following the Games Scott retired from tandem cycling and returned to able bodied single bike racing. In 2013 Scott rode for Euride Racing in the Australian National Road Series. Scott has raced for Cycling Team Tomacc based in Poperinge, Belgium for the 2014/2015 seasons.

== Recognition ==
McPhee was awarded an Order of Australia Medal in the 2014 Australia Day Honours "for service to sport as a Gold Medallist at the London 2012 Paralympic Games."
