= Fabrizio Macchi =

Italian Paralympic cyclist

Personal information
- Born: 26 July 1970 (age 55) Varese, Italy

Sport
- Country: Italy
- Sport: Para-cycling
Medal record
Event	1st	2nd	3rd
Paralympic Games	0	0	1

Fabrizio Macchi (born 26 July 1970) is a former Italian paralympic cyclist who won a bronze medal at the 2004 Summer Paralympics.
