= Kieran Modra =

Australian cyclist

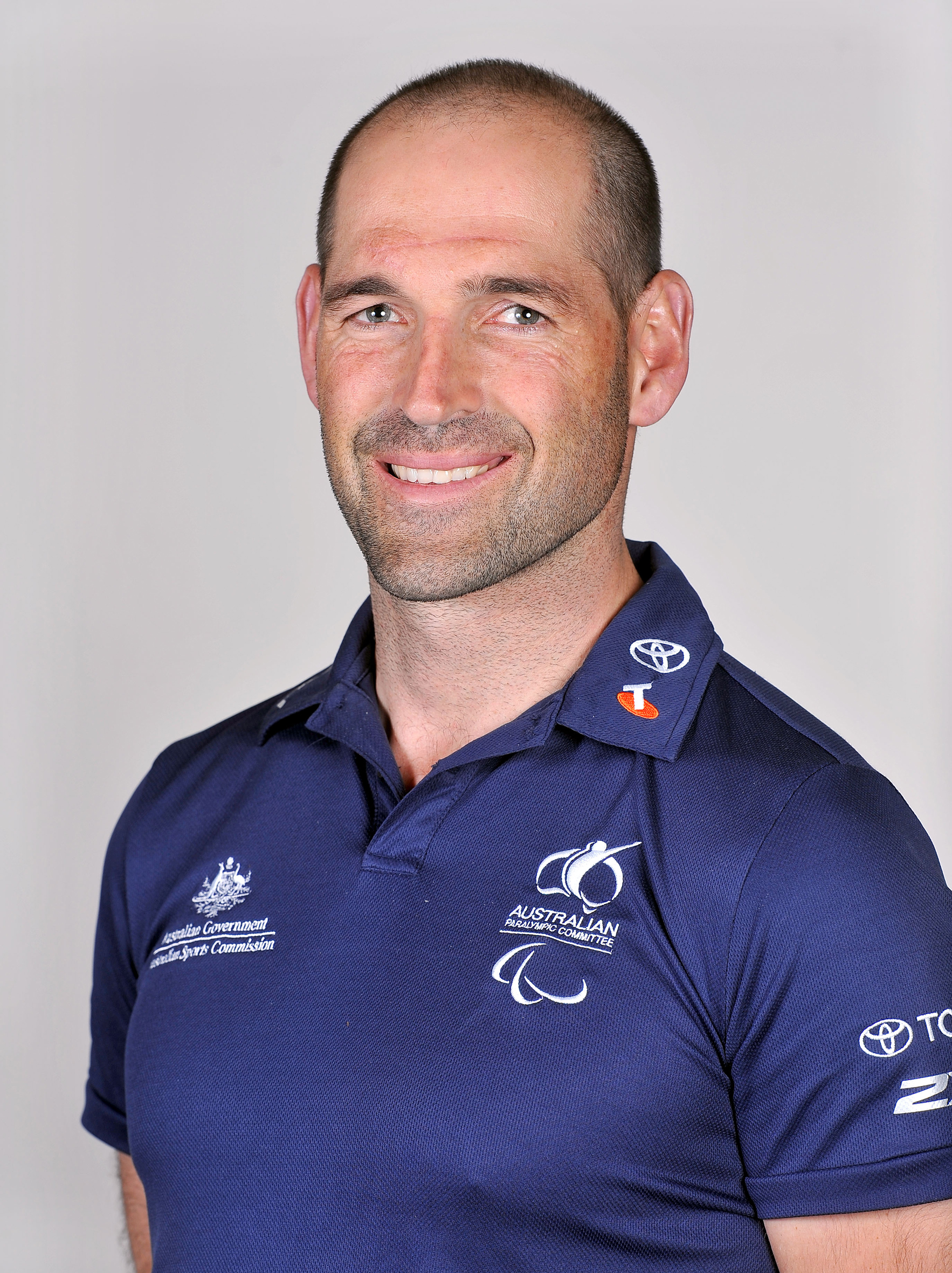
- 2012 Australian Paralympic team portrait of Modra

Personal information
- Full name: Kieran John Modra
- Born: 27 March 1972 Port Lincoln, South Australia, Australia
- Died: 13 November 2019 (aged 47) Kingsford, South Australia, Australia
- Spouse: Kerry Golding (m. 1997)

Sport
- Sport: Athletics, swimming, cycling
Medal record
Men's swimming
Paralympic Games
Bronze medal – third place	1992 Barcelona	Men's 100 m Backstroke B3
Bronze medal – third place	1992 Barcelona	Men's 200 m Backstroke B3
Men's cycling
Paralympic Games
Gold medal – first place	1996 Atlanta	Mixed 200 m Sprint Tandem open
Gold medal – first place	2004 Athens	Men's Individual Pursuit Tandem B1–3
Gold medal – first place	2004 Athens	Men's Sprint Tandem B1–3
Gold medal – first place	2008 Beijing	Men's Individual Pursuit B&VI 1–3
Gold medal – first place	2012 London	Men's Individual pursuit B
Bronze medal – third place	2004 Athens	Men's Road Race / Time Trial Tandem B1–3
Bronze medal – third place	2008 Beijing	Men's 1km time trial B&VI 1–3
Bronze medal – third place	2016 Rio de Janeiro	Road time trial B
UCI Para-cycling Track World Championships
Gold medal – first place	1998 Colorado Springs	Mixed Tandem Sprint B
Gold medal – first place	1998 Colorado Springs	Mixed Tandem Time Trial B
Gold medal – first place	1998 Colorado Springs	Mixed Tandem Individual Pursuit B
Gold medal – first place	2002 Altenstadt	Mixed Tandem Sprint
Gold medal – first place	2002 Altenstadt	Mixed Tandem 1km Time Trial
Gold medal – first place	2011 Montichiari	Men's Tandem 4 km Pursuit B
Silver medal – second place	2014 Aguascalientes	Men's Tandem 1km Time Trial B
Silver medal – second place	2014 Aguascalientes	Men's Tandem Sprint B
Gold medal – first place	2016 Montichiari	Men's Tandem 4 km Pursuit B
Commonwealth Games
Silver medal – second place	2014 Glasgow	Men's Tandem 1 km Time Trial B
Silver medal – second place	2014 Glasgow	Men's Tandem Sprint B

Kieran John Modra AM (27 March 1972 – 13 November 2019) was an Australian Paralympic swimmer and tandem cyclist. He won five gold and five bronze medals at eight Paralympic Games from 1988 to 2016, along with two silver medals at the 2014 Glasgow Commonwealth Games.

== Early life ==
Modra was born in the South Australian town of Port Lincoln on 27 March 1972 as the third of four children, and became visually impaired due to congenital juvenile optic atrophy. He grew up on a farm in Greenpatch, about 20 kilometres (12 mi) north of Port Lincoln, and attended high school at Immanuel College.

== Career ==
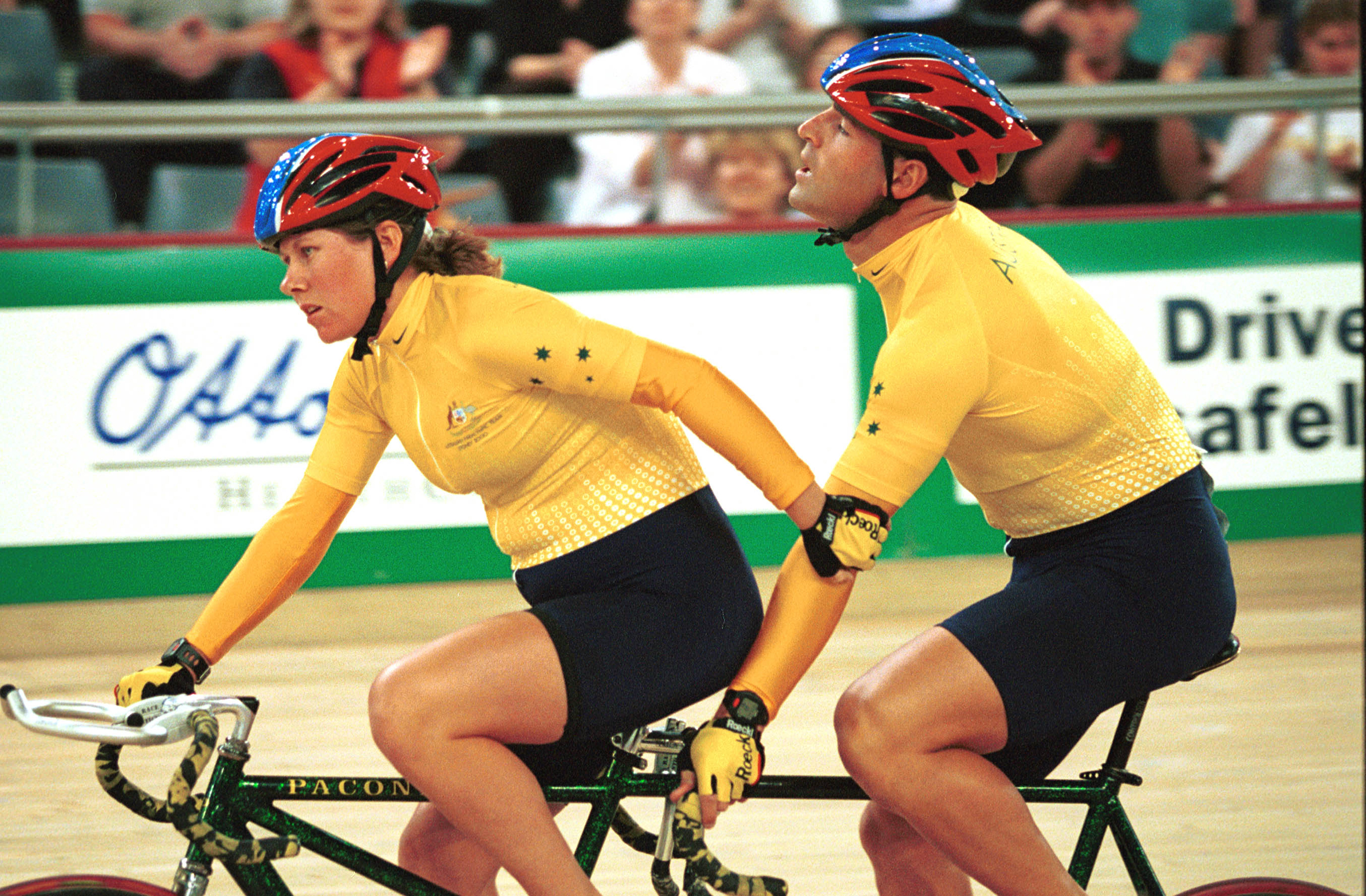
Modra with his cycling pilot and wife Kerry Modra during the 1 km Time Trial at the 2000 Summer Paralympics

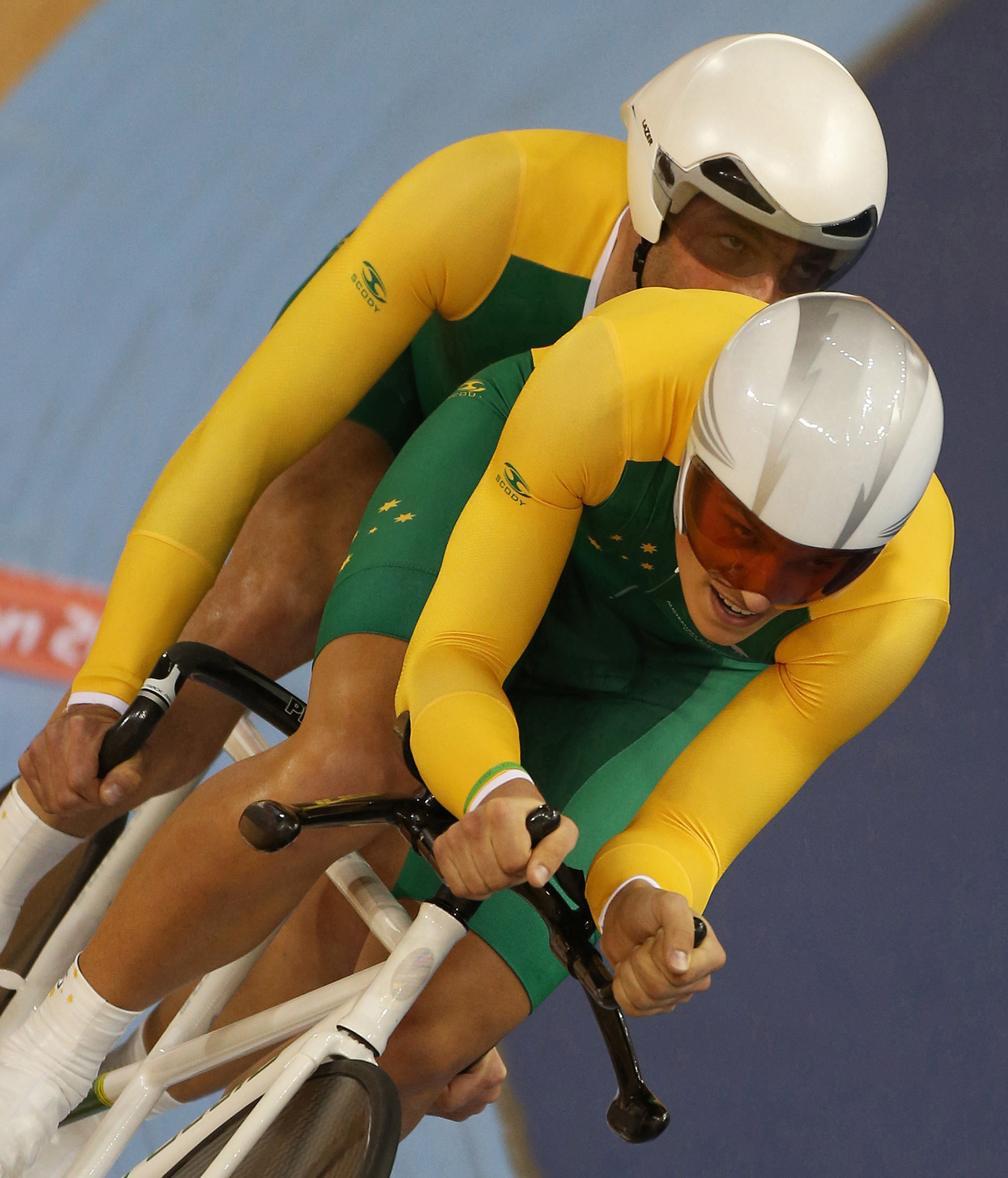
Modra and his pilot Scott McPhee at the 2012 London Paralympics

Modra began pole vaulting in 1987 and won the pole vaulting competition at the 1989 Australian All-School Championships. He competed in athletics at the 1988 Seoul Paralympics where he competed in the Men's 1500 m B3 and Men's Javelin B3. He took up swimming to aid his recovery from a knee injury, and began competing in the sport in 1990. At the 1992 Paralympics in Barcelona, where he competed in both athletics and swimming, he won two bronze medals in the Men's 100 m Backstroke B3 and Men's 200 m Backstroke B3 events.

Modra then switched to road and track cycle racing in 1995, because it was a "mode of transport". At the 1996 Atlanta Games, where he was piloted by his future wife Kerry Golding, he won a gold medal in the Mixed 200 m Sprint Tandem open event. In 1998 and 1999, he held an Australian Institute of Sport Athletes with a Disability scholarship. At the 1998 UCI Para-cycling Track World Championships in Colorado Springs with pilot Kerry Modra, he won gold medals in the Mixed Tandem Sprint B, Mixed Tandem Time Trial B and Mixed Individual Pursuit B. He competed in the 2000 Sydney Games, but did not win any medals at those Games. Modra's pilot, Kerry, was pregnant with the couple's first child at the games, and fainted due to low blood pressure during a quarter-final sprint race; Modra's sister, Tania Modra, was his pilot for the rest of the games. His sister Tania also piloted Sarnya Parker in tandem cycling at the 2000 Sydney Games, where the pair won two gold medals. At the 2002 IPC World Cycling Championships in Altenstadt, Germany with pilot Darren Harry, he won gold medals in the Men's Tandem Sprint Time Trial and Men's Tandem 1 km Time Trial.

Leading up to the 2004 Athens Games, Modra was piloted by David Short and Robert Crowe for sprint and endurance events, respectively. Shortly before the games, he was evicted from the Australian cycling team due to a successful appeal to the Court of Arbitration for Sport by fellow tandem cyclist Lyn Lepore, on the grounds that she deserved her place in the team because when each of Modra's pilot–rider combinations was counted separately, she had a higher rank than Modra. The day before the opening ceremony, the Australian Paralympic Committee successfully appealed to the International Paralympic Committee to give Modra an extra place in the team.

At the 2004 games, he won two gold medals, in the Men's Individual Pursuit Tandem B1–3 event, in which he broke a world record with a time of 4:21.451, and the Men's Sprint Tandem B1–3 event, and a bronze medal in the Men's Road Race / Time Trial Tandem B1–3 event. In the second of the three races in the individual sprint semi-final, Modra and Short fell off their bike after its front tyre rolled off the wheel. Despite having skin torn off their arms, legs and shoulders in the fall, they won the third semi-final race and rode in the final 45 minutes later, where they won the gold medal.

The individual pursuit (B&VI 1–3) world record was broken by Modra and Tyson Lawrence in Bordeaux on 21 August 2007, in a time of 4:20.891.

He broke his own world record in the preliminary round of the individual pursuit (B&VI 1–3) with a time of 4:18.961, piloted by Lawrence, they broke the record again in the final with a time of 4:18.166.

At the 2008 Summer Paralympics, Modra represented Australia with Lawrence in the 1 km time trial (B&VI 1–3) and individual pursuit (B&VI 1–3) events, winning a bronze and gold medal, respectively.

In 2011 Modra made a return to the bike with new pilot Scott McPhee where they won gold in the tandem B&VI 4 km pursuit at the 2011 Montichiari UCI Para-cycling Track World Championships setting a new world record of 4:17.780. They placed 2nd at the Sydney road world cup in the tandem road race and 3rd in the tandem road time trial at the 2011 Segovia world cup. In the lead up to the road world championships in September Modra suffered a broken collarbone and fractured hip due to a fall in training. His recovery was swift and he returned to the bike a month later to win the Oceania 4 km pursuit championship. In December 2011, he collided with a car while cycling to work, breaking two vertebrae in his neck and one in his spine; this accident hampered his preparations for the 2012 London Games. He won a gold medal at the games in the Men's Individual Pursuit B with McPhee.

At the 2014 UCI Para-cycling Track World Championships in Aguascalientes, Mexico, he teamed with pilot Jason Niblett to win the silver medals in the Men's Sprint B and Men's B 1 km Time Trial. With pilot Jason Niblett, he won two silver medals in the Men's tandem sprint B and Men's tandem time trial at the 2014 Glasgow Commonwealth Games. At the 2016 Montichiari UCI Para-cycling Track World Championships, Modra won gold with pilot David Edwards in the Men's Tandem 4 km Pursuit.

At the 2016 Rio de Janeiro Paralympics, Modra and his pilot David Edwards won the bronze medal in the Men's Road Time Trial B. His other results were sixth in the Men's Individual Pursuit B and fifth in the Men's Road Race B.

== Personal life ==
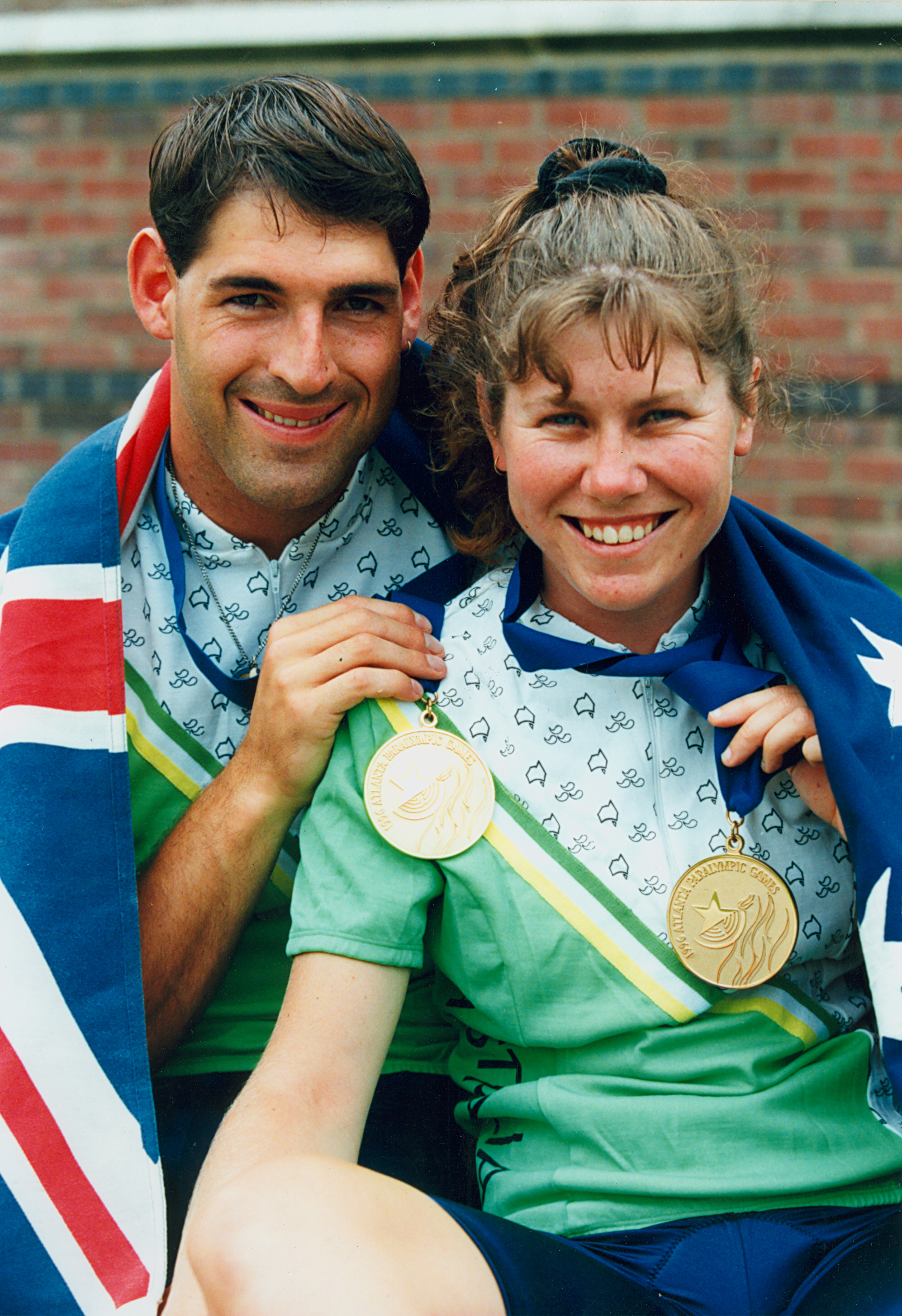
Modra (left) and his pilot and wife Kerry in 2008 showing the gold medal that they won in the 200 m sprint event at the 1996 Atlanta Paralympics

Modra married Kerry Golding in May 1997, whom he met at a friend's 21st birthday party, and they had three daughters.

=== Death ===
Modra died after he was hit by a car travelling in the same direction on the Sturt Highway in Kingsford on 13 November 2019. He was cycling from Gawler to his uncle and aunt's house near Tanunda to join a ride with them in the Clare Valley.

== Recognition ==
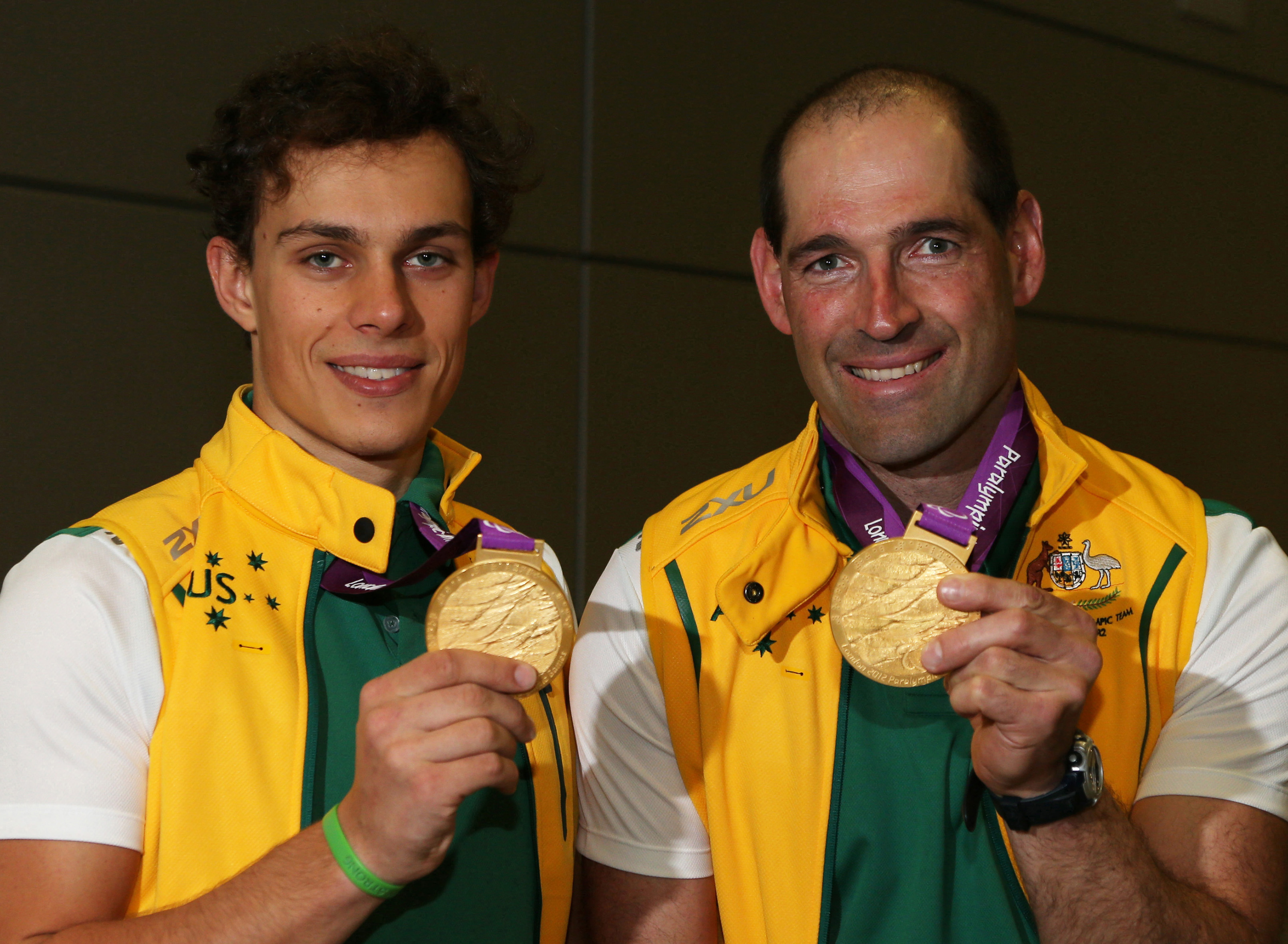
Modra (right) and McPhee (left), gold medallists at the 2012 London Paralympics

Modra received the following awards:

- 1997: Medal of the Order of Australia
- 2000: Australian Sports Medal
- 2004: Australian Male Paralympian of the Year
- 2011: South Australian Institute of Sport Athlete with a Disability of the Year with Scott McPhee.
- 2014: Appointed a Member of the Order of Australia in the 2014 Australia Day Honours "For significant service to sport as an athlete representing Australia at Paralympic Games, and to people who are blind or have low vision"
- 2014: South Australian Institute of Sport Male Athlete with a Disability of the Year with Jason Niblett
- 2020: AusCycling Meritorious Award
- 2025: AusCycling Hall of Fame
