= Sean Finning =

Australian cyclist (born 1985)

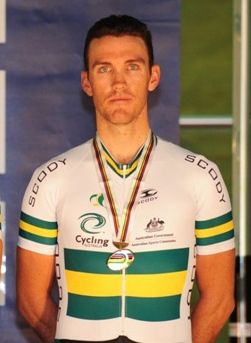
- Portrait of Australian Paralympic Team cyclist Finning

Personal information
- Nationality: Australian
- Born: 22 January 1985 (age 41)

Sport
- Country: Australia
- Sport: Cycling
- Club: Castlemaine CC
Medal record
Cycling
Paralympic Games
Silver medal – second place	2012 London	Men's individual pursuit B

Sean Finning (born 22 January 1985) is an Australian cyclist. He competed at the 2006 Commonwealth Games where he won a gold medal. He was selected to represent Australia at the 2012 Summer Paralympics in cycling as a sighted pilot.

== Personal ==
Finning was born on 22 January 1985 in Kyneton, Victoria. He attended Castlemaine Secondary College, leaving school after year 11. As of 2012, he lives in Castlemaine, Victoria and works for PJ's Discount Tyres.

== Cycling ==
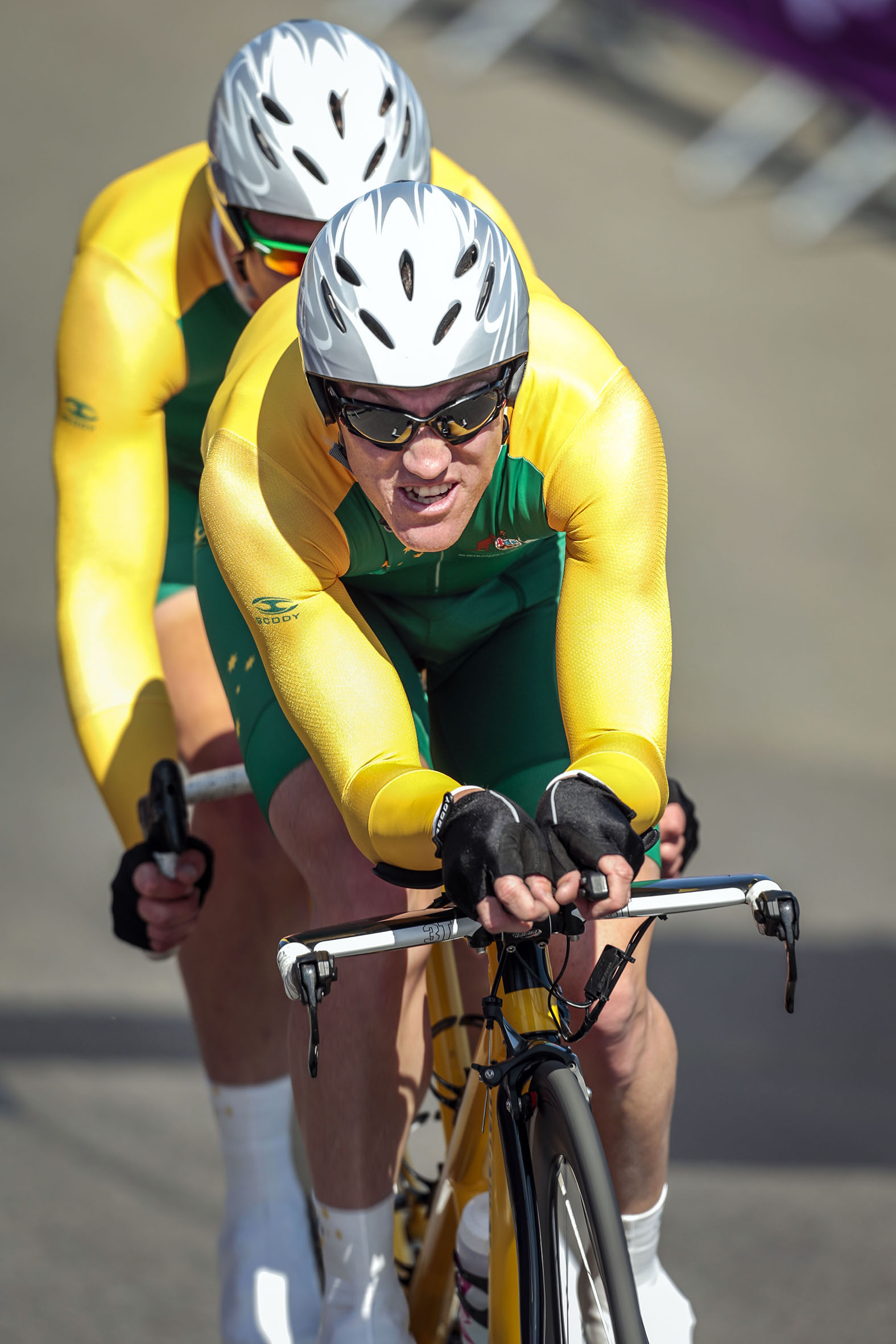
Bryce Lindores & Sean Finning at the 2012 London Paralympics

Finning is a cyclist. He is a member of the Castlemaine CC.

Finning competed at the 2006 Commonwealth Games where he won a gold medal. In 2010, he was the sighted pilot for Bryce Lindores at the Segovia Para-cycling World Cup where he earned a gold medal. He competed solo at the 2012 Bendigo International Madison. He was selected to represent Australia at the 2012 Summer Paralympics in cycling as a sighted pilot for Bryce Lindores.
