= Bryce Lindores =

Australian Paralympic cyclist

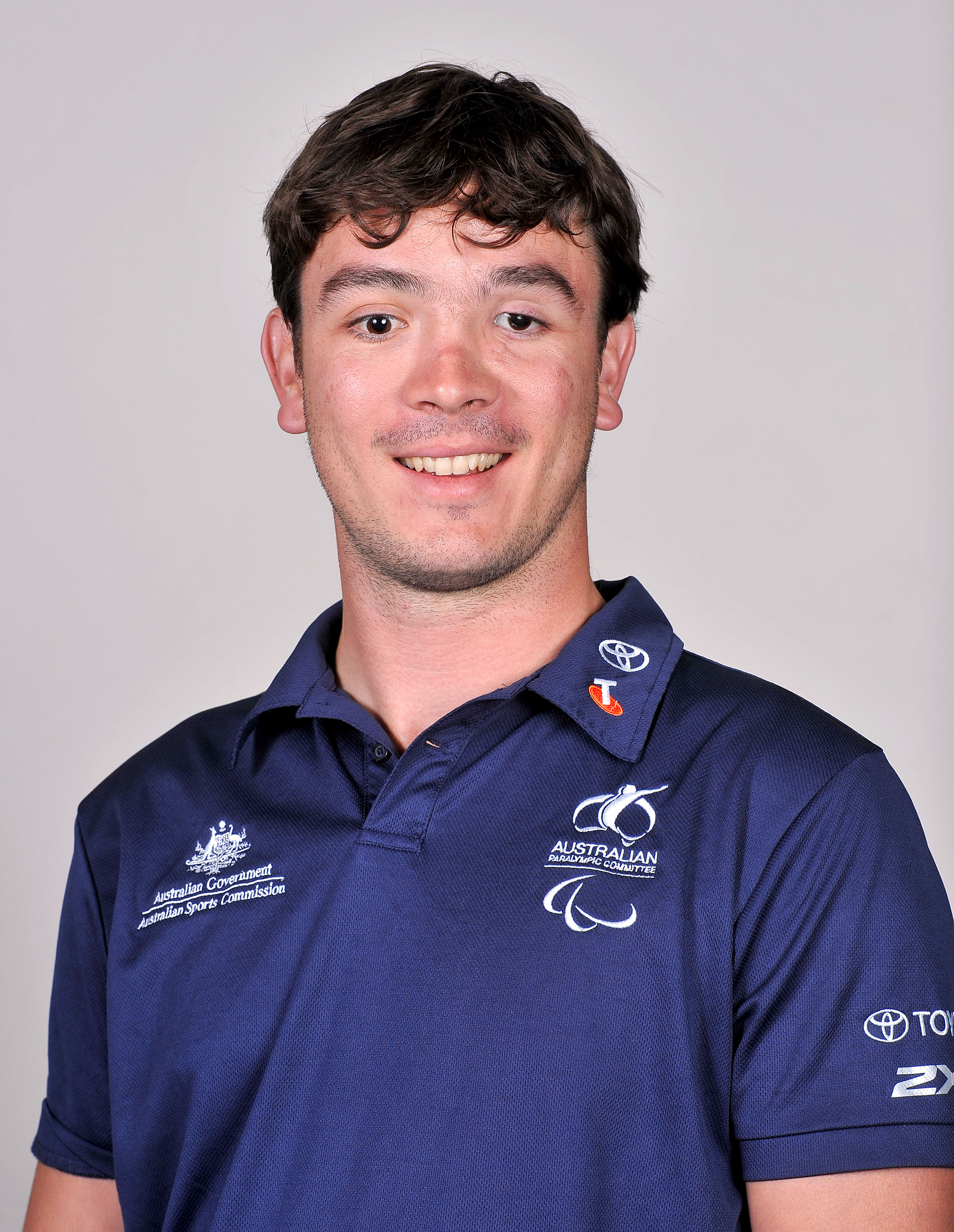
- 2012 Australian Paralympic team portrait of Lindores

Personal information
- Nationality: Australia
- Born: 12 September 1986 (age 39) Gold Coast, Queensland

Sport
- Disability class: B1
Medal record
Cycling
Paralympic Games
Silver medal – second place	2012 London	Men's individual pursuit B
Bronze medal – third place	2008 Beijing	Men's individual pursuit B VI 1-3
UCI Para-cycling Track World Championships
Bronze medal – third place	2006 Aigle	Men's Sprint B
Gold medal – first place	2012 Carsonu	Men's Sprint B
Bronze medal – third place	2011 Montichiari	Men's individual pursuit B

Bryce Lindores (born 12 September 1986) is an Australian Paralympic tandem cyclist.

== Biography ==
Lindores was born on the Gold Coast and attended Somerset College, at which a road was later named after him. He played rugby, tennis and touch football when he was young. He became blind six days before his eighteenth birthday due to an accident in which a towing rope snapped while he was towing a car with his ute.

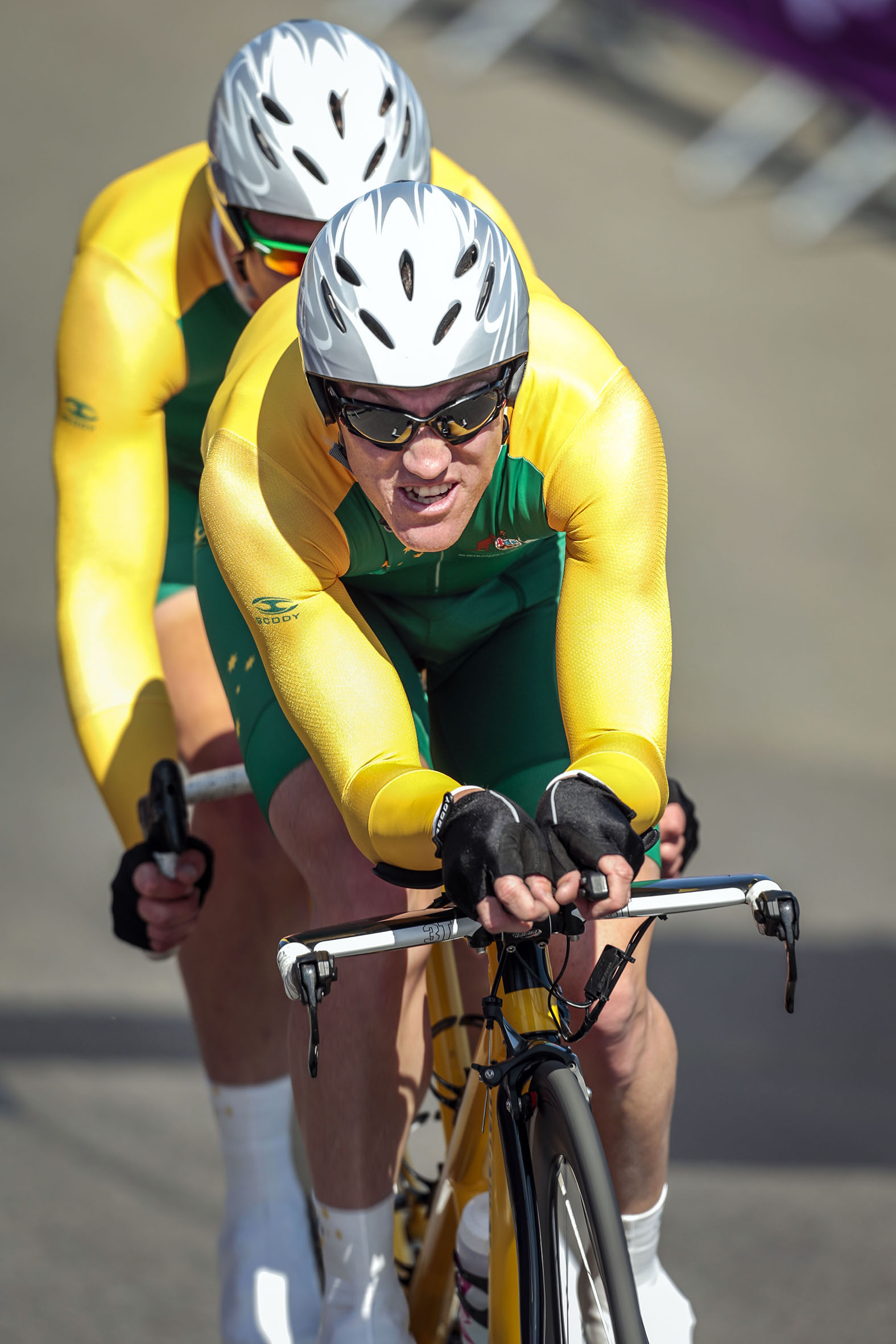
Bryce Lindores & Sean Finning at the 2012 London Paralympics

Lindores began cycling in 2006, two years after the accident that took his sight. Six months later, he won a bronze medal riding with pilot Steve Storer at the 2006 UCI Para-cycling Track World Championships in Aigle, Switzerland and was awarded the 2006 Queensland Tandem Cyclist of the Year. He won a bronze medal at the 2008 Beijing Games in the Men's Individual Pursuit B VI 1–3 event with his pilot Steven George; the pair took six seconds off their personal best. In 2009, he climbed Mount Kilimanjaro, Africa's highest mountain. He won a road racing gold medal at the 2010 Road World Cup. In 2011, his pilot was Sean Finning; that year he won a bronze medal in the 4 km individual pursuit at the 2011 UCI Para-cycling Track World Championships and a gold and silver medal in road events at the national championships. In 2012 he won a gold medal at the UCI Para-cycling Track World Championships in the men's tandem 4 km pursuit with his pilot Scott McPhee in their first competition together; his usual pilot, former world champion Mark Jamieson, could not attend the competition. He competed with Sean Finning at the 2012 London Paralympics and they won the silver medal in the Men's individual pursuit B . Lindores was due to ride with Jamieson, but Jamieson was denied a visa to enter England due to a criminal record. He had planned to compete at the 2016 Rio de Janeiro Paralympics but was forced to retire from sport due to a bulging disc. He then went on to manage his father's farm in Allenview which became a turf farm.
