= Diego Javier Muñoz =

Spanish cyclist

Personal information
- Nationality: Spanish
- Born: 5 April 1974 (age 52)

Sport
- Country: Spain
- Sport: Cycling

Diego Javier Muñoz (born 5 April 1974) is a Spanish cyclist, who has served as a pilot for visually impaired Paralympic competitor Miguel Ángel Clemente Solano. Competing with Clemente, they won a silver at the 2011 World Championships and a bronze at the 2012 Summer Paralympics.

== Personal ==
Muñoz was born on 5 May 1974 outside of Spain. He is from Murcia, residing in Santiago El Mayor in 2012. In 2013, Muñoz was awarded the bronze Real Orden al Mérito Deportivo.

== Cycling ==
In 2011, as the pilot for Miguel Ángel Clemente Solano, Muñoz won a silver medal in the track pursuit event. Muñoz competed at the 2012 Summer Paralympics in cycling as a guide for Miguel Ángel Clemente Solano. In the track pursuit event, the pair won a bronze medal when racing head to head against a pair from Ireland.
