= Miguel Ángel Clemente =

Spanish cyclist (born 1969)

Personal information
- Full name: Miguel Ángel Clemente Solano
- Nationality: Spanish
- Born: 19 December 1969 (age 56) Murcia, Spain

Sport
- Country: Spain
- Sport: Cycling

Miguel Ángel Clemente Solano (born 19 December 1969 in Murcia) is a cyclist from Spain.

== Personal ==
He has a vision impairment. In 2013, he was awarded the bronze Real Orden al Mérito Deportivo.

== Cycling ==
He competed at the 2004 Summer Paralympics in cycling. He competed at the 2012 Summer Paralympics in cycling, winning a bronze in the men's visually impaired team pursuit race while racing with guide cyclist Diego Javier Muñoz.
