= 2015 WNWBL season =

- League: Women's National Wheelchair Basketball League
- Season: 2015
- Duration: 8 May – 12 July 2015 (Regular season); 7–9 August 2015 (Finals series)
- Matches played: 45
- Teams: 5

Regular season
- Season champions: Kilsyth Cobras
- Season MVP: (Australia) Clare Nott (Kilsyth Cobras)

Finals
- Champions: Kilsyth Cobras (4th title)
- Runners-up: Be Active Western Stars
- Semi-finalists: MineCraft Comets; Stacks Goudkamp Bears

Statistical leaders
Points	(Australia) Amber Merritt (Western Stars)	31.6
Rebounds	(Australia) Georgia Munro-Cook (SG Bears)	11.3
Assists	(Australia) Kylie Gauci (SG Bears)	7.8

WNWBL seasons
- ← 2014 2016 →
- Statistics are approximations based on available data from games

The 2015 WNWBL season was the 16th season of the Women's National Wheelchair Basketball League since its establishment in 2000. A total of five teams contested the league during the season, with a regular season taking place between 8 May and 12 July 2015, followed by a finals series involving the top four teams from 7 to 9 August 2015 at the Herb Graham Recreation Centre in Mirrabooka, Western Australia.

In their first season after rebranding, the Kilsyth Cobras won their fourth championship, under a fourth different name, after defeating the Be Active Western Stars in the Grand Final. Kilsyth also won the National Wheelchair Basketball League during the 2015 season, marking the first and only time, as of 2026, that a club has won both competitions in the same season.

== Teams ==
The same five teams contested the league as in the 2014 season, after Victoria rebranded as the Kilsyth Cobras.

Club	City	Region/State	Arena
Be Active Western Stars	Perth	Western Australia	Herb Graham Recreation Centre
Kilsyth Cobras	Melbourne	Victoria	Kilsyth Sports Centre
MineCraft Comets	Brisbane	Queensland	Eagle Sports Complex
Stacks Goudkamp Bears	Sydney	New South Wales	North Sydney Indoor Sports Centre
Sydney University Flames	Sydney	New South Wales	Sydney University Sports and Aquatic Centre

== Regular season ==
The regular season began on 8 May 2015 and consisted of 40 games (16 per team) spread across four central venue rounds, ending on 12 July 2015. Statistical data is incomplete for this season, and is only included for matches where the data is complete.

=== Round 1 ===
8 May 2015	Sydney University Flames	49–52	Kilsyth Cobras	Sydney Uni Sports & Aquatic Centre, Sydney
18:00 AEST
	Pts: Stewart 23; Rebs: Stewart 11; Asts: Stewart 8	boxscore	Pts: Del Toso 29; Rebs: Chaplin 10; Asts: Chaplin 7

8 May 2015	Be Active Western Stars	54–50	MineCraft Comets	Sydney Uni Sports & Aquatic Centre, Sydney
20:00 AEST
		boxscore

9 May 2015	Kilsyth Cobras	62–35	Stacks Goudkamp Bears	Sydney Uni Sports & Aquatic Centre, Sydney
13:00 AEST
	Pts: Chaplin 23; Rebs: Hammond 19; Asts: Nott 8	boxscore	Pts: O'Kelly-Kennedy 16; Rebs: O'Kelly-Kennedy 13; Asts: Gauci 4

9 May 2015	Sydney University Flames	37–33	MineCraft Comets	Sydney Uni Sports & Aquatic Centre, Sydney
15:00 AEST
		boxscore

9 May 2015	Stacks Goudkamp Bears	65–55	Be Active Western Stars	Sydney Uni Sports & Aquatic Centre, Sydney
17:00 AEST
	Pts: Gauci 23; Rebs: Munro-Cook 13; Asts: Gauci 11	boxscore	Pts: Merritt 20; Rebs: Merritt 7 Asts: Merritt 8

9 May 2015	MineCraft Comets	37–63	Kilsyth Cobras	Sydney Uni Sports & Aquatic Centre, Sydney
19:00 AEST
		boxscore

10 May 2015	Be Active Western Stars	75–56	Sydney University Flames	Sydney Uni Sports & Aquatic Centre, Sydney
09:00 AEST
	Pts: Merritt 43; Rebs: Merritt 14; Asts: Inglis 6	boxscore	Pts: Stewart 22; Rebs: Stewart 11; Asts: Dinga 7

10 May 2015	Stacks Goudkamp Bears	51–57	MineCraft Comets	Sydney Uni Sports & Aquatic Centre, Sydney
11:00 AEST
		boxscore

10 May 2015	Kilsyth Cobras	62–58	Be Active Western Stars	Sydney Uni Sports & Aquatic Centre, Sydney
13:00 AEST
	Pts: Del Toso 27; Rebs: Hammond 10; Asts: Nott 8	boxscore	Pts: Merritt 33; Rebs: Merritt 13; Asts: Vinci 5

10 May 2015	Sydney University Flames	54–45	Stacks Goudkamp Bears	Sydney Uni Sports & Aquatic Centre, Sydney
15:00 AEST
	Pts: Lisle 17; Rebs: Stewart, van Leeuwen 8 Asts: Stewart 10	boxscore	Pts: Munro-Cook 17; Rebs: Munro-Cook 9 Asts: Gauci 8

=== Round 2 ===
15 May 2015	Stacks Goudkamp Bears	36–57	Kilsyth Cobras	Eagle Sports Complex, Brisbane
18:00 AEST
	Pts: Gauci 22; Rebs: Carruthers 10; Asts: Gauci 4	boxscore	Pts: Hammond 29; Rebs: Hammond 18; Asts: Del Toso 5

15 May 2015	MineCraft Comets	64–51	Sydney University Flames	Eagle Sports Complex, Brisbane
20:00 AEST
		boxscore

16 May 2015	Kilsyth Cobras	62–59	Be Active Western Stars	Eagle Sports Complex, Brisbane
10:00 AEST
	Pts: Hammond 22; Rebs: Hammond 14; Asts: Nott 9	boxscore	Pts: Merritt 22; Rebs: Merritt 12; Asts: Inglis 7

16 May 2015	Sydney University Flames	47–42	Stacks Goudkamp Bears	Eagle Sports Complex, Brisbane
12:00 AEST
	Pts: Stewart 20; Rebs: Stewart 11; Asts: Stewart 8	boxscore	Pts: Gauci 24; Rebs: Munro-Cook 11; Asts: Gauci 7

16 May 2015	MineCraft Comets	38–43	Kilsyth Cobras	Eagle Sports Complex, Brisbane
14:00 AEST
		boxscore

16 May 2015	Be Active Western Stars	68–22	Sydney University Flames	Eagle Sports Complex, Brisbane
16:00 AEST
	Pts: Merritt 31; Rebs: Delcoure 12; Asts: Inglis 6	boxscore	Pts: Stewart 15; Rebs: Stewart 13; Asts: Cronje, Nelson 7

16 May 2015	Stacks Goudkamp Bears	47–51	MineCraft Comets	Eagle Sports Complex, Brisbane
18:00 AEST
		boxscore

17 May 2015	Be Active Western Stars	62–44	Stacks Goudkamp Bears	Eagle Sports Complex, Brisbane
09:00 AEST
	Pts: Merritt 37; Rebs: Delcoure 12; Asts: Inglis, Merritt 4	boxscore	Pts: Munro-Cook 25; Rebs: Munro-Cook 10; Asts: Gauci 9

17 May 2015	Sydney University Flames	48–52	Kilsyth Cobras	Eagle Sports Complex, Brisbane
11:00 AEST
	Pts: Stewart 25; Rebs: Stewart 11; Asts: Stewart 6	boxscore	Pts: Del Toso 30; Rebs: Del Toso 11; Asts: Del Toso 3

17 May 2015	MineCraft Comets	35–56	Be Active Western Stars	Eagle Sports Complex, Brisbane
13:00 AEST
		boxscore

=== Round 3 ===
12 June 2015	Sydney University Flames	33–48	MineCraft Comets	Kilsyth Sports Centre, Melbourne
16:00 AEST
		boxscore

12 June 2015	Be Active Western Stars	61–51	Stacks Goudkamp Bears	Kilsyth Sports Centre, Melbourne
18:00 AEST
	Pts: Merritt 35; Rebs: Merritt 13; Asts: Inglis 11	boxscore	Pts: Munro-Cook 23; Rebs: Munro-Cook 13; Asts: Gauci 9

12 June 2015	MineCraft Comets	53–56	Kilsyth Cobras	Kilsyth Sports Centre, Melbourne
20:00 AEST
		boxscore

13 June 2015	Sydney University Flames	29–65	Stacks Goudkamp Bears	Kilsyth Sports Centre, Melbourne
08:00 AEST
	Pts: Dinga, Cronje 8 Rebs: Dinga 14; Asts: Dinga 4	boxscore	Pts: Gauci 34; Rebs: O'Kelly-Kennedy 12; Asts: O'Kelly-Kennedy 5

13 June 2015	MineCraft Comets	54–50	Be Active Western Stars	Kilsyth Sports Centre, Melbourne
10:00 AEST
		boxscore

13 June 2015	Kilsyth Cobras	71–33	Sydney University Flames	Kilsyth Sports Centre, Melbourne
12:00 AEST
	Pts: Hammond 24; Rebs: Del Toso 12; Asts: Chaplin 8	boxscore	Pts: Dinga 13; Rebs: Dodd, van Leeuwen 8 Asts: Dinga 4

13 June 2015	Stacks Goudkamp Bears	51–68	MineCraft Comets	Kilsyth Sports Centre, Melbourne
14:00 AEST
		boxscore

13 June 2015	Be Active Western Stars	51–66	Kilsyth Cobras	Kilsyth Sports Centre, Melbourne
10:00 AEST
	Pts: Merritt 41; Rebs: Merritt 11; Asts: Inglis 8	boxscore	Pts: Del Toso 22; Rebs: Del Toso, Chaplin 9 Asts: Chaplin 10

14 June 2015	Sydney University Flames	38–56	Be Active Western Stars	Kilsyth Sports Centre, Melbourne
08:00 AEST
	Pts: Lisle, Cronje, van Leeuwen 10; Rebs: Dinga 12; Asts: Dodd 5	boxscore	Pts: Merritt 29; Rebs: Delcoure 11; Asts: Inglis 10

14 June 2015	Kilsyth Cobras	68–46	Stacks Goudkamp Bears	Kilsyth Sports Centre, Melbourne
10:00 AEST
	Pts: Del Toso 28; Rebs: Del Toso 10; Asts: Nott 6	boxscore	Pts: Munro-Cook 17; Rebs: Munro-Cook 12; Asts: Gauci 9

=== Round 4 ===
10 July 2015	Be Active Western Stars	33–65	MineCraft Comets	North Sydney Indoor Sports Centre, Sydney
18:00 AEST
		boxscore

10 July 2015	Stacks Goudkamp Bears	47–76	Kilsyth Cobras	North Sydney Indoor Sports Centre, Sydney
20:00 AEST
	Pts: Gauci 18; Rebs: Munro-Cook 11; Asts: Gauci 5	boxscore	Pts: Hammond 33; Rebs: Chaplin 9 Asts: Chaplin 13

11 July 2015	Sydney University Flames	32–59	MineCraft Comets	North Sydney Indoor Sports Centre, Sydney
10:00 AEST
		boxscore

11 July 2015	Stacks Goudkamp Bears	47–60	Be Active Western Stars	North Sydney Indoor Sports Centre, Sydney
12:00 AEST
	Pts: Munro-Cook 16; Rebs: Munro-Cook 12; Asts: Gauci 8	boxscore	Pts: Merritt 33; Rebs: Merritt 13; Asts: Inglis 9

11 July 2015	Kilsyth Cobras	83–28	Sydney University Flames	North Sydney Indoor Sports Centre, Sydney
14:00 AEST
	Pts: Hammond 26; Rebs: Hammond 13; Asts: Hammond 8	boxscore	Pts: Dinga 10; Rebs: Dinga 6 Asts: Dinga 5

11 July 2015	MineCraft Comets	60–37	Stacks Goudkamp Bears	North Sydney Indoor Sports Centre, Sydney
16:00 AEST
		boxscore

11 July 2015	Be Active Western Stars	42–63	Kilsyth Cobras	North Sydney Indoor Sports Centre, Sydney
18:00 AEST
	Pts: Merritt 30; Rebs: Inglis 12; Asts: Merritt 5	boxscore	Pts: Del Toso 26; Rebs: Chaplin 9 Asts: Chaplin 12

12 July 2015	Sydney University Flames	28–56	Be Active Western Stars	North Sydney Indoor Sports Centre, Sydney
09:00 AEST
	Pts: Cronje 12; Rebs: Lisle 12; Asts: Dinga 5	boxscore	Pts: Merritt 25; Rebs: Delcoure 10; Asts: Inglis 5

12 July 2015	Kilsyth Cobras	67–43	MineCraft Comets	North Sydney Indoor Sports Centre, Sydney
11:00 AEST
		boxscore

12 July 2015	Stacks Goudkamp Bears	73–26	Sydney University Flames	North Sydney Indoor Sports Centre, Sydney
13:00 AEST
	Pts: Munro-Cook 27; Rebs: Munro-Cook, Carruthers 14; Asts: Gauci 16	boxscore	Pts: Cronje 16; Rebs: Dinga, Dodd 8 Asts: Dinga 4

== Ladder ==
Pos	Team	Pld	W	L	PF	PA	PD	PCT	Qualification
1	Kilsyth Cobras	16	16	0	1003	703	+300	1.000	Qualification to finals series
2	MineCraft Comets	16	9	7	815	761	+54	.563 (Note: MineCraft Comets 2–2, +11 PD, Be Active Western Stars 2–2, –11 PD.)	Qualification to finals series
3	Be Active Western Stars	16	9	7	896	808	+88	.563	Qualification to finals series
4	Stacks Goudkamp Bears	16	3	13	782	893	−111	.188 (Note: Stacks Goudkamp Bears 2–2, +69 PD, Sydney University Flames 2–2, –69 PD.)	Qualification to finals series
5	Sydney University Flames	16	3	13	611	942	−331	.188	

Updated to match(es) played on 12 June 2015. Source: WNWBL via Game Day
Rules for classification: 1) win percentage; 2) head-to-head record; 3) points differential among tied teams; 4) points for among tied teams; 5) points differential overall; 6) points for overall.

=== Ladder progression ===
2015 WNWBL season
Team ╲ Round	1	2	3	4
Be Active Western Stars	2	2	2	3
Kilsyth Cobras	1	1	1	1
MineCraft Comets	4	3	3	2
Stacks Goudkamp Bears	5	5	5	4
Sydney University Flames	3	4	4	5

Updated to match(es) played on 17 May 2015. Source: WNWBL via Game Day
= Leader and qualification to finals series; = Qualification to finals series

== Finals series ==
Semi-finals
7 August – Mirrabooka
1	Kilsyth Cobras	66
2	MineCraft Comets	63
7 August – Mirrabooka
3	Be Active Western Stars	57
4	Stacks Goudkamp Bears	56

Preliminary final
8 August – Mirrabooka
MineCraft Comets	47
Be Active Western Stars	48

Grand Final
9 August – Mirrabooka
Kilsyth Cobras	60
Be Active Western Stars	45
Third place play-off
9 August – Mirrabooka
MineCraft Comets	84
Stacks Goudkamp Bears	43

Source: WNWBL via Game Day

=== Semi-finals ===
7 August 2015	Kilsyth Cobras	66–63	MineCraft Comets	Herb Graham Recreation Centre, Perth
18:00 AWST
	Pts: Hammond 38; Rebs: Hammond 19; Asts: Del Toso 9	boxscore	Pts: Kean 31; Rebs: Crispin 13; Asts: Cronau 5

7 August 2015	Be Active Western Stars	57–56	Stacks Goudkamp Bears	Herb Graham Recreation Centre, Perth
20:00 AWST
	Pts: Merritt 25; Rebs: Vinci, Delcoure, Inglis, Merritt 10; Asts: Inglis 8	boxscore	Pts: Munro-Cook 26; Rebs: Munro-Cook, Carruthers 10; Asts: Gauci 8

=== Preliminary final ===
8 August 2015	MineCraft Comets	47–48	Be Active Western Stars	Herb Graham Recreation Centre, Perth
18:00 AWST
	Pts: Crispin 16; Rebs: Crispin 13; Asts: Kean 7	boxscore	Pts: Merritt 16; Rebs: Inglis, Merritt 10; Asts: Inglis, Merritt 4

=== Third place play-off ===
9 August 2015	MineCraft Comets	84–43	Stacks Goudkamp Bears	Herb Graham Recreation Centre, Perth
11:00 AWST
	Pts: Crispin 30; Rebs: Crispin 12; Asts: Kean 9	boxscore	Pts: Munro-Cook 16; Rebs: Carruthers 11; Asts: Gauci 7

=== Grand Final ===
9 August 2015	Kilsyth Cobras	60–45	Be Active Western Stars	Herb Graham Recreation Centre, Perth
13:00 AWST
	Pts: Chaplin 15; Rebs: Del Toso 14; Asts: Chaplin 7	boxscore	Pts: Merritt 30; Rebs: Merritt 14; Asts: Delcoure, Inglis 3

== Honours ==
=== Season awards ===
- Most Valuable Player (Overall): Clare Nott (Kilsyth Cobras)
- Most Valuable 1-Point Player: Clare Nott (Kilsyth Cobras)
- Most Valuable 2-Point Player: Kylie Gauci (Stacks Goudkamp Bears)
- Most Valuable 3-Point Player: Leanne Del Toso (Kilsyth Cobras)
- Most Valuable 4-Point Player: Amber Merritt (Be Active Western Stars)
- Finals Series Most Valuable Player: Clare Nott (Kilsyth Cobras)
- Highest Point Scorer: Amber Merritt (Be Active Western Stars)
- Best New Talent: Zeena Suavaga (Stacks Goudkamp Bears)

=== All-Star Five ===
- Clare Nott (Kilsyth Cobras)
- Kylie Gauci (Stacks Goudkamp Bears)
- Leanne Del Toso (Kilsyth Cobras)
- Amber Merritt (Be Active Western Stars)
- Sarah Vinci (Be Active Western Stars)
