= Women's National Wheelchair Basketball League =

Australian wheelchair basketball league

- Current season, competition or edition: 2026 WNWBL season
- Sport: Wheelchair basketball Wheelchair 3x3 basketball
- Founded: 2000
- No. of teams: 6
- Country: Australia
- Continent: IWBF Asia Oceania
- Most recent champions: 5v5: Sydney Blues (3rd title); 3x3: Sydney Blues (1st title)
- Most titles: 5v5: Sydney Uni Lions (11); 3x3: Sydney Blues (1)
- Website: Wheelchair Basketball Australia

The Women's National Wheelchair Basketball League (WNWBL) is a women's semi-professional wheelchair basketball league in Australia currently composed of six teams. The league was founded in 2000 and is the women's counterpart to the National Wheelchair Basketball League (NWBL). The league was in recess during the 2020 and 2021 seasons, and again in 2023, before being revived in 2024 under the governance of Wheelchair Basketball Australia. Since 2025, the league has included a concurrent 3x3 competition.

== History ==
The Women's National Wheelchair Basketball League was founded in 2000 in the lead-up to the Summer Paralympics being hosted in Sydney. The history of the early years of the league is not easy to establish, but the inaugural championship appears to have been contested by up to six teams—Adelaide Storm, Hills Hornets, Northern Premiers, North Sydney Bears, Victorian Wheelies and Whittlesea City Pacers—and was won by the Victorian Wheelies, while Liesl Tesch was named the inaugural Most Valuable Player.

The remainder of the league's first decade was dominated by Sydney-based teams, with the North Sydney Bears winning the 2001 title, before the Hills Hornets won eight consecutive titles between 2002 and 2009, led by Liesl Tesch and Kylie Gauci, and later by Sarah Stewart. The Adelaide Storm and Whittlesea City Pacers left the league after only a few seasons, before the Western Stars joined in 2006, while the MineCraft Comets went into recess after the 2008 season.

The four seasons between 2007 and 2010 saw all four remaining foundation clubs undergoing rebrands, with the former Hills Hornets winning a ninth consecutive title in 2010 as the Sydney University Flames. The Flames' dominance came to an end in the following season as the VIC Dandenong Rangers claimed their second title with a three-point win at North Sydney. The 2011 season also saw the return of the MineCraft Comets, while Western Stars forward Amber Merritt announced herself as a force, winning her first of nine consecutive scoring titles and earning the first of nine consecutive selections as the Most Valuable 4-Point Player, both of which are league records.

Despite rebranding as simply Victoria for the 2012 season, the former Rangers won back-to-back titles with a dominant performance on their home court at Dandenong Stadium. The 2013 season saw the Western Stars come from third place on the ladder after the regular season to upset Victoria and the Stacks Goudkamp Bears to claim their maiden title at the Sydney University Sports and Aquatic Centre (SUSAC). The MineCraft Comets broke through for their maiden title in 2014 led by Ella Sabljak and on home court at Mount Gravatt.

Entering the 2015 season, Victoria affiliated with a third different South East Australian Basketball League club in the last decade, rebranding as the Kilsyth Cobras, and immediately winning their fourth title on the back of All-Star Five selection for Leanne Del Toso and a Most Valuable Player award for Clare Nott. The Cobras produced the first perfect season in league history, winning all sixteen regular season games before defeating the MineCraft Comets and Western Stars to win the title. Led by Amber Merritt and Sarah Vinci, the Western Stars went close to matching this performance in 2016, losing just one game on the penultimate day of the regular season, before defeating the newly rebranded Sydney Metro Blues twice to claim their second title.

The league introduced a sixth team going into the 2017 season, with the Melbourne-based Red Dust Lady Heelers joining the competition. After winning their first title in 2001, and going through a series of rebrands between 2008 and 2016, the Sydney Metro Blues entered the 2017 season on the back of eight consecutive finals appearances. Led by eight-time Most Valuable Player and sixteen-time All-Star Five selection Kylie Gauci, the Blues finally broke through for their second title after previously losing in the Grand Final in 2012, 2013 and 2016. The season also saw Georgia Munro-Cook have a breakout season for the Blues, recording five double-doubles during the season and leading the team in scoring on the way to her first All-Star Five selection.

After affiliating with the Hills Hornets of the Waratah League, the Sydney Metro Blue Hornets reached a tenth consecutive finals appearance after the 2018 regular season, but lost twice to their cross-town rivals Sydney University Flames to finish the season in fourth. The Queensland Comets, meanwhile, recorded back-to-back wins against the Western Stars in the semi-final and grand final to win their second title. The Sydney University Flames returned to the winners list in 2019, winning a record-extending tenth title after losing in their semi-final against the rebranded Perth Wheelcats, before defeating the Sydney Metro Blue Hornets in the preliminary final and the Wheelcats in the grand final.

The outbreak of the COVID-19 pandemic saw the league go into recess for the 2020 and 2021 seasons. Upon its return in 2022, neither the Kilsyth Cobras nor the Red Dust Lady Heelers returned and the competition reverted to a four-team league. The Perth Wheelcats produced the second perfect season in league history, winning all nine regular season games by an average of 36 points, before defeating the Sydney Metro Blue Hornets in both the semi-final and grand final by a combined margin of 49 points on the way to their third title.

The league went into recess again for the 2023 season, but was revived again after just one season under the governance of the newly-founded Wheelchair Basketball Australia (WBA), again contested by the same four teams, although the Blue Hornets had rebranded as the Sydney Blues. The Perth Wheelcats picked up where they left off, winning all six of their regular season games—marking seventeen wins in succession since the start of 2022—before being upset by the Sydney Uni Flames in the semi-final. Although they bounced back in the preliminary final against the Sydney Blues, they were again defeated by the Flames in the grand final as Sydney Uni went on to claim their eleventh league title.

The 2025 season saw a massive shake-up for the league, with the Queensland Comets folding, the Flames rebranding as the Sydney Uni Lions and three new teams—Adelaide Thunder, Gold Coast Rollers and Victoria Wonders—joining the competition. WBA also introduced a new 3x3 competition to run alongside the main league, using slightly modified rules to allow games to be played on a normal basketball court. In the main league, the Sydney Blues were dominant, losing just one regular season game before defeating the Sydney Uni Lions twice in the finals series to win their third title. The Blues were similarly dominant in the 3x3 competition, dropping just one game to the Perth Wheelcats on the way to claiming the first ever 3x3 title.

== Teams ==
=== Current clubs ===
Overview of WNWBL teams
Club	Founded	City	Region/State	Arena (Note: Arenas shown with their non-commercial names where possible.)	Capacity	Head coach	Title(s)
Adelaide Thunder	2025	Adelaide	South Australia	State Basketball Centre	1,600	(Australia) David Gould	0
Gold Coast Rollers	2025	Gold Coast	Queensland	Carrara Indoor Stadium	2,992	(Australia) Ella Sabljak	0
Perth Wheelcats (Note: Founded as the Western Stars (2006–2018).)	2006	Perth	Western Australia	WA Basketball Centre	2,000	(Australia) Rob Pike	3
Sydney Blues (Note: Founded as the North Sydney Bears (2000–2007), also previously known as the Goudkamp Gladiators (2008–2010), the Stacks Goudkamp Bears (2011–2015), the Sydney Metro Blues (2016–2017), and the Sydney Metro Blue Hornets (2018–2022).)	2000	Sydney	New South Wales	Auburn Basketball Centre	500	(Australia) Troy Sachs	3
Sydney Uni Lions (Note: Founded as the Hills Hornets (2000–2009), also previously known as the Sydney University/Sydney Uni Flames (2010–2024).)	2000	Sydney	New South Wales	Sydney Uni Sport and Fitness (Note: Sydney Uni Lions currently also host home games at Kevin Betts Stadium (capacity: 500).)	600	(Australia) Hannah Dodd	11
Victoria Wonders	2025	Melbourne	Victoria	State Basketball Centre (Note: Victoria Wonders currently also host home games at Bendigo Stadium (capacity: 4,000) and Keilor Stadium (capacity: 2,000).)	3,200	(Australia) Lauren Robinson	0

=== Former clubs ===
Club	Founded	Last season	City	Region/State	Arena	Capacity	Title(s)
Kilsyth Cobras (Note: Founded as the Victorian Wheelies (2000–2004), also previously known as the Knox Raiders (2005–2008) VIC Dandenong Rangers (2009–2011), and Victoria (2012–2014).)	2000	2019	Melbourne	Victoria	Kilsyth Sports Centre	500	4
Queensland Comets (Note: Founded as the Northern Premiers (2000–2001), also previously known as the Queensland Storm (2002–2005), MineCraft Comets (2006–2008, 2011–2015), and MineCraft Queensland Comets (2016).)	2000	2024 (Note: The Comets were in recess between 2008 and 2011.)	Brisbane	Queensland	Mt Warren Sports and Fitness Centre	1,000	2
Red Dust Lady Heelers	2017	2019	Melbourne	Victoria	LaTrobe University	—	0

== Honours ==
=== List of WNWBL champions ===
==== 5v5 ====
Year	Winner	Result	Runner-up	Venue	Ref.
2000	Victorian Wheelies	details unknown			
2001	North Sydney Bears	details unknown			
2002	Hills Hornets	details unknown			
2003	Hills Hornets	details unknown			
2004	Hills Hornets	details unknown			
2005	Hills Hornets	details unknown			
2006	Hills Hornets	details unknown			
2007	Hills Hornets	details unknown			
2008	Hills Hornets	details unknown			
2009	Hills Hornets	66–49	Western Stars	Sydney University Sports and Aquatic Centre	
2010	Sydney University Flames	61–51	Western Stars	Herb Graham Recreation Centre	
2011	VIC Dandenong Rangers	62–59	Sydney University Flames	North Sydney Indoor Sports Centre	
2012	Victoria	78–39	Stacks Goudkamp Bears	Dandenong Stadium	
2013	Western Stars	43–40	Stacks Goudkamp Bears	Sydney University Sports and Aquatic Centre	
2014	MineCraft Comets	40–38	Victoria	Hibiscus Sports Complex	
2015	Kilsyth Cobras	60–45	Western Stars	Herb Graham Recreation Centre	
2016	Western Stars	72–58	Sydney Metro Blues	Sydney University Sports and Aquatic Centre	
2017	Sydney Metro Blues	57–44	Sydney University Flames	Coomera Indoor Sports Centre	
2018	Queensland Comets	71–64	Perth Wheelcats	WA Basketball Centre	
2019	Sydney University Flames	55–50	Perth Wheelcats	Southern Districts Basketball Centre	
2020	League in recess due to COVID-19 pandemic				
2021	League in recess due to COVID-19 pandemic				
2022	Perth Wheelcats	52–35	Sydney Metro Blue Hornets	Darwin Basketball Stadium	
2023	League in recess				
2024	Sydney University Flames	57–44	Perth Wheelcats	Shellharbour City Stadium	
2025	Sydney Blues	69–38	Sydney Uni Lions	Northern Beaches Indoor Sports Centre	

==== 3x3 ====
Year	Winner	Result	Runner-up	Venue	Ref.
2025	Sydney Blues	8–7	Perth Wheelcats	Northern Beaches Indoor Sports Centre	

=== Awards ===
MVP – 1 Pointer
Year	Player	Team	Reference
2009	Clare Burzynski	Western Stars	
2010	Clare Burzynski	Western Stars	
2011	Clare Burzynski	Be Active Western Stars	
2012	Amanda Carter	Dandenong Rangers	
2013	Clare Nott	Be Active Western Stars	
2014	Ella Sabljak	Minecraft Comets	
2015	Clare Nott	Kilsyth Cobras	
2016	Sarah Vinci	Be Active Western Stars	
2017	Sarah Vinci	Be Active Western Stars	
2018	Hannah Dodd	Sydney Uni Flames	
2019	Hannah Dodd	Sydney Uni Flames	

MVP – 2 Pointer
Year	Player	Team	Reference
2009	Kylie Gauci	Goudcamp Gladiators	
2010	Kylie Gauci	Goudcamp Gladiators	
2011	Kylie Gauci	Sachs Goudcamp Bears	
2012	Kylie Gauci	Sachs Goudcamp Bears	
2013	Kylie Gauci	Sachs Goudcamp Bears	
2014	Kylie Gauci	Sachs Goudcamp Bears	
2015	Kylie Gauci	Sachs Goudcamp Bears	
2016	Kylie Gauci	Sydney Metro Blues	
2017	Hannah Dodd	Sydney University Flames	
2018	Kylie Gauci	Sydney Metro Blues	
2019	Georgia Inglis	Perth Wheelcats	

MVP – 3 Pointer
Year	Player	Team	Reference
2009	Sarah Stewart	Hills Hornets	
2010	Sarah Stewart	Sydney University Flames	
2011	Shelley Chaplin	Dandenong Rangers	
2012	Shelley Chaplin	Dandenong Rangers	
2013	Sarah Stewart	Sydney University Flames	
2014	Sarah Stewart	Sydney University Flames	
2015	Leanne Del Toso	Kilsyth Cobras	
2016	Sarah Stewart	Sydney University Flames	
2017	Sarah Stewart	Sydney University Flames	
2018	Leanne Del Toso	Kilsyth Cobras	
2019	Leanne Del Toso	Kilsyth Cobras	

MVP – 4 Pointer
Year	Player	Team	Reference
2010	Liesl Tesch	Sydney Uni Flames	
2011	Amber Merritt	Be Active Western Stars	
2012	Amber Merritt	Be Active Western Stars	
2013	Amber Merritt	Be Active Western Stars	
2014	Amber Merritt	Be Active Western Stars	
2015	Amber Merritt	Be Active Western Stars	
2016	Amber Merritt	Be Active Western Stars	
2017	Amber Merritt	Be Active Western Stars	
2018	Amber Merritt	Be Active Western Stars	
2019	Amber Merritt	Perth Wheelcats	

Finals series MVP
Year	Player	Team	Reference
2009	Katie Hill	Hills Hornets	
2010	Liesl Tesch	Sydney Uni Flames	
2011	Shelley Chaplin	Victoria Dandenong Rangers	
2012	Cobi Crispin	Victoria Dandenong	
2013	Mari Amimoto	Stacks Goudkamp Bears	

Overall MVP
Year	Player	Team	Reference
2000	Liesl Tesch	Hills Hornets	
2001	Liesl Tesch	Hills Hornets	
2002	Alison Mosely	Queensland Storm	
2003	Kylie Gauci	Hills Hornets	
2004	Liesl Tesch	Hills Hornets	
2005	Shelley Chaplin	Knox Ford Raiders	
2006	Alison Mosely	Queensland Comets	
2007	Kylie Gauci	Goudcamp Gladiators	
2008	Kylie Gauci	Goudcamp Gladiators	
2009	Kylie Gauci	Goudcamp Gladiators	
2010	Kylie Gauci	Goudcamp Gladiators	
2011	Kylie Gauci	Sachs Goudcamp Bears	
2012	Kylie Gauci	Sachs Goudcamp Bears	
2013	Kylie Gauci	Sachs Goudcamp Bears	
2014	Kylie Gauci	Sachs Goudcamp Bears	
2015	Clare Nott	Kilsyth Cobras	
2016	Sarah Stewart	Sydney University Flames	
2018	Cobi Crispin	Queensland Comets	
2019	Annabelle Lindsay	Sydney Uni Flames	

All Star Five
Year	Player	Team	Reference
2000	Liesl Tesch	Hills Hornets	
2000	Paula Coughlan	Victorian Wheelies	
2000	Alison Mosely	Northern Premiers	
2000	Lisa O'Nion	North Sydney Bears	
2000	Coralie Crossley	Adelaide Storm	
2001	Liesl Tesch	Hills Hornets	
2001	Alison Mosely	Northern Premiers	
2001	Lisa O'Nion	North Sydney Bears	
2001	Juilianne Adams	Victorian Wheelies	
2001	Kylie Gauci	Hills Hornets	
2002	Alison Mosely	Queensland Storm	
2002	Lisa O'Nion	North Sydney Bears	
2002	Juilianne Adams	Victorian Wheelies	
2002	Kylie Gauci	Hills Hornets	
2002	Paula Coughlan	Victorian Wheelies	
2003	Kylie Gauci	Hills Hornets	
2003	Alison Mosely	Queensland Storm	
2003	Juilianne Adams	Victorian Wheelies	
2003	Lisa O'Nion	North Sydney Bears	
2003	Liesl Tesch	Hills Hornets	
2004	Liesl Tesch	Hills Hornets	
2004	Jenny Pattison	North's Bears	
2004	Tina Mckenzie	Knox Raiders	
2004	Kylie Gauci	Hills Hornets	
2004	Sarah Stewart	North's Bears	
2005	Shelley Chaplin	Knox Ford Raiders	
2005	Alison Mosely	Queensland Storm	
2005	Kylie Gauci	Hills Hornets	
2005	Jane Sachs	North's Bears	
2005	Melanie Hall	Queensland Storm	
2006	Alison Mosely	Queensland Comets	
2006	Jenny Nichols	North's Bears	
2006	Tina Mckenzie	Knox Raiders	
2006	Kylie Gauci	North's Bears	
2006	Mandy Bonavita	Western Stars	
2007	Liesl Tesch	Hills Hornets	
2007	Nu Nguyen-Thi	Western Stars	
2007	Tina Mckenzie	Knox Raiders	
2007	Katie Hill	Hills Hornets	
2007	Kylie Gauci	North's Bears	
2008	Amanda Carter	Dandenong Rangers	
2008	Kylie Gauci	Goudkamp Gladiators	
2008	Sarah Stewart	Hills Hornets	
2008	Cobi Crispin	Western Stars	
2008	Liesl Tesch	Hills Hornets	
2009	Clare Burzynski	Western Stars	
2009	Kylie Gauci	Goudkamp Gladiators	
2009	Sarah Stewart	Hills Hornets	
2009	Cobi Crispin	Western Stars	
2009	Liesl Tesch	Hills Hornets	
2010	Clare Burzynski	Western Stars	
2010	Kylie Gauci	Goudkamp Gladiators	
2010	Sarah Stewart	Sydney Uni Flames	
2010	Cobi Crispin	Western Stars	
2010	Liesl Tesch	Sydney Uni Flames	
2011	Clare Burzynski	Western Stars	
2011	Kylie Gauci	Goudkamp Gladiators	
2011	Shelley Chaplin	Dandenong Rangers	
2011	Amber Merritt	Western Stars	
2011	Cobi Crispin	Dandenong Rangers	
2012	Amanda Carter	Dandenong Rangers	
2012	Kylie Gauci	Stacks Goudkamp Bears	
2012	Shelley Chaplin	Dandenong Rangers	
2012	Amber Merritt	Western Stars	
2012	Sarah Stewart	Sydney Uni Flames	
2013	Clare Nott	Be Active Western Stars	
2013	Kylie Gauci	Stacks Goudkamp Bears	
2013	Sarah Stewart	Sydney Uni Flames	
2013	Amber Merritt	Western Stars	
2013	Cobi Crispin	Victoria	
2014	Ella Sabljak	Minecraft Comets	
2014	Kylie Gauci	Stacks Goudkamp Bears	
2014	Sarah Stewart	Sydney Uni Flames	
2014	Amber Merritt	Western Stars	
2014	Georgia Inglis	Western Stars	
2015	Clare Nott	Kilsyth Cobras	
2015	Kylie Gauci	Stacks Goudkamp Bears	
2015	Leanne Del Toso	Kilsyth Cobras	
2015	Amber Merritt	Be Active Western Stars	
2015	Sarah Vinci	Be Active Western Stars	
2016	Sarah Vinci	Be Active Western Stars	
2016	Kylie Gauci	Sydney Metro Blues	
2016	Sarah Stewart	Sydney Uni Flames	
2016	Amber Merritt	Be Active Western Stars	
2016	Bridie Kean	Sydney Metro Blues	
2017	Sarah Vinci	Be Active Western Stars	
2017	Hannah Dodd	Sydney Uni Flames	
2017	Sarah Stewart	Sydney Uni Flames	
2017	Amber Merritt	Be Active Western Stars	
2017	Georgia Munro-Cook	Sydney Metro Blues	
2018	Hannah Dodd	Sydney Uni Flames	
2018	Kylie Gauci	Sydney Metro Blues	
2018	Leanne Del Tosos	Kilsyth Kobras	
2018	Amber Merritt	Be Active Western Stars	
2018	Cobi Crispin	Queensland Comets	
2019	Hannah Dodd	Sydney Uni Flames	
2019	Georgia Inglis	Perth Wheelcats	
2019	Leanne Del Tosos	Kilsyth Kobras	
2019	Amber Merritt	Perth Wheelcats	
2019	Sarah Vinci	Perth Wheelcats	

Voted by the coaches and referees

Best New Talent
Year	Player	Team	Reference
2001	Emily Jansen	Victorian Wheelies	
2002	Sarah Stewart	North Sydney Bears	
2003	Jenny Pattison	North's Bears	
2004	Emily Tobin	Queenslanders	
2005	Clare Burzynski	Queensland Storm	
2006	Sharnie Grazules	Hills Hornets	
2007	Leanne Del Toso	Knox Raiders	
2008	Amber Merritt	Western Stars	
2009	Anne Marie Howarth	Goupkamp Gladiators	
2010	Shelley Cronau	Sydney University Flames	
2011	Natalie Hodges	Minecraft Comets	
2012	Jasmine Clark	Minecraft Comets	
2013	Ellie Cole	Victoria	
2014	Laura Bassegio	Victoria	
2015	Zeena Suavaga	Stacks Goudkamp Bears	
2016	Annabelle Lindsay	Sydney University Flames	
2017	Teisha Shadwell	Kilsyth Cobras	

Voted by the captain of each team.

Highest Point Scorer
Year	Player	Team	Reference
2000	Liesl Tesch	Hills Hornets	
2001	Alison Mosely	North Sydney Bears	
2002	Alison Mosely	Queensland Storm	
2003	Kylie Gauci	Hills Hornets	
2004	Alison Mosely	Queenslanders	
2005	Jenny Nichols	North's Bears	
2006	Alison Mosely	Queensland Comets	
2007	Liesl Tesch	Hills Hornets	
2008	Liesl Tesch	Hills Hornets	
2009	Cobi Crispin	Perth Western Stars	
2010	Sarah Stewart	Sydney University Flames	
2011	Amber Merritt	Be Active Western Stars	
2012	Amber Merritt	Be Active Western Stars	
2013	Amber Merritt	Be Active Western Stars	
2014	Amber Merritt	Be Active Western Stars	
2015	Amber Merritt	Be Active Western Stars	
2016	Amber Merritt	Be Active Western Stars	
2017	Amber Merritt	Be Active Western Stars	
2018	Amber Merritt	Be Active Western Stars	
2019	Amber Merritt	Perth Wheelcats	
