= National Wheelchair Basketball League =

National Wheelchair Basketball League may refer to:

- National Wheelchair Basketball League (Australia), Australian mixed league
- Women's National Wheelchair Basketball League, Australian women's league
