= Sarah Vinci =

Australian wheelchair basketball player (born 1991)

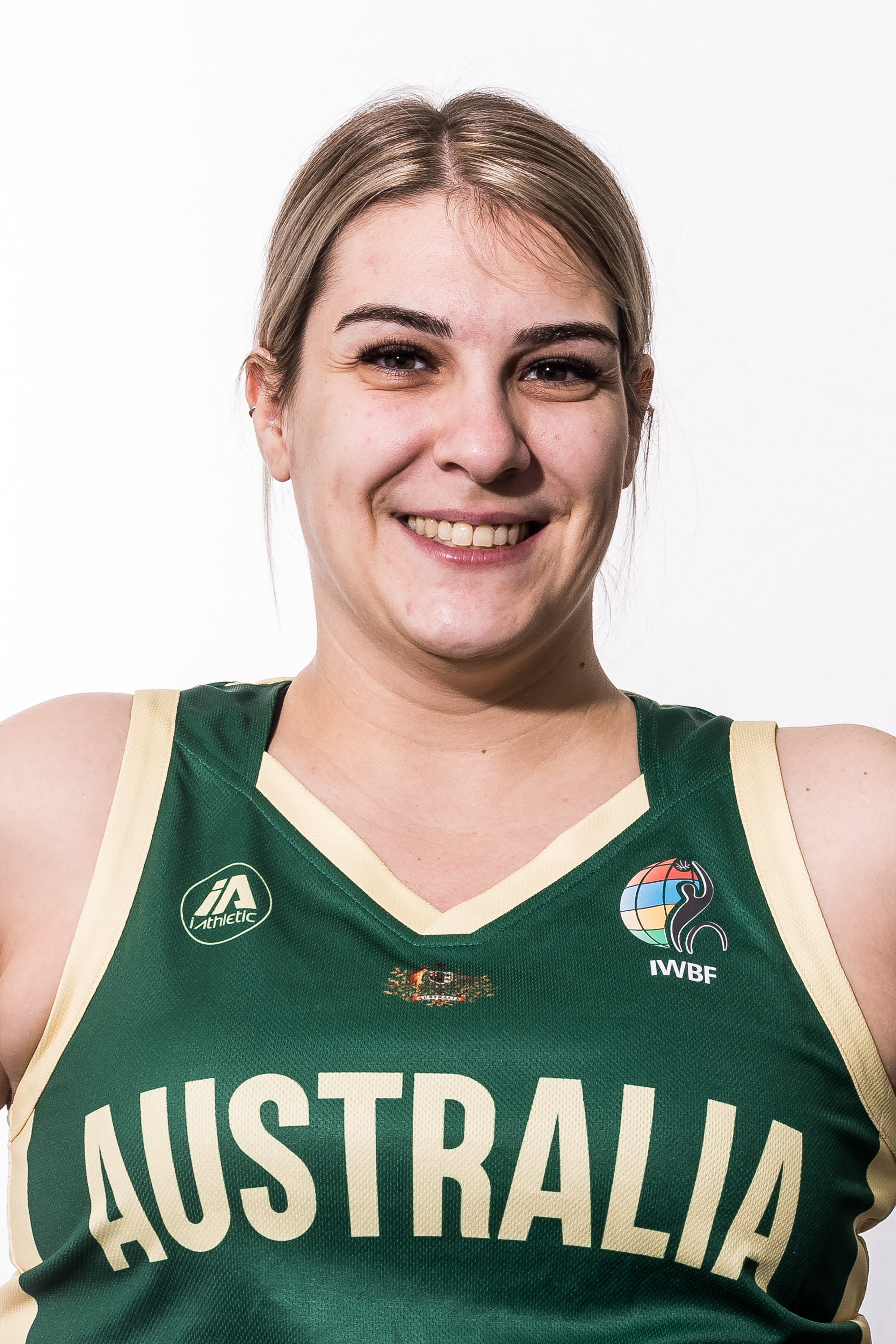
- No. 4 Sarah Vinci

Personal information
- Born: 4 December 1991 (age 34)

Sport
- Country: Australia
- Sport: Wheelchair basketball
- Disability: Spina bifida
- Disability class: 1.0
- Event: Women's team
- Club: Perth Wildcats
Medal record
Wheelchair basketball
Paralympic Games
Silver medal – second place	2012 London	Women's Wheelchair basketball
U25 Women's World Championships
Silver medal – second place	2011 St Catharines	Women's wheelchair basketball
Silver medal – second place	2015 Beijing	Women's wheelchair basketball

Sarah Vinci (born 4 December 1991) is a 1 point wheelchair basketball player who plays for the Perth Western Stars in the Australian Women's National Wheelchair Basketball League. She made her debut with the Australia women's national wheelchair basketball team, known as the Gliders, in 2011, when she played in the Osaka Cup in Japan. Vinci represented Australia at the 2012 Summer Paralympics in London in wheelchair basketball, winning a silver medal. She represented Australia at the 2020 Summer Paralympics in Tokyo.

== Personal life ==
Vinci was born on 4 December 1991 in Perth, Western Australia. She has spina bifida. As of 2013, Vinci lived in Perth, Western Australia, and was a student. She has attended a Technical and Further Education (TAFE) institute, where she earned a certificate in digital media.

Sarah volunteers at the Telethon community cinemas to help support children's charities.

== Career ==
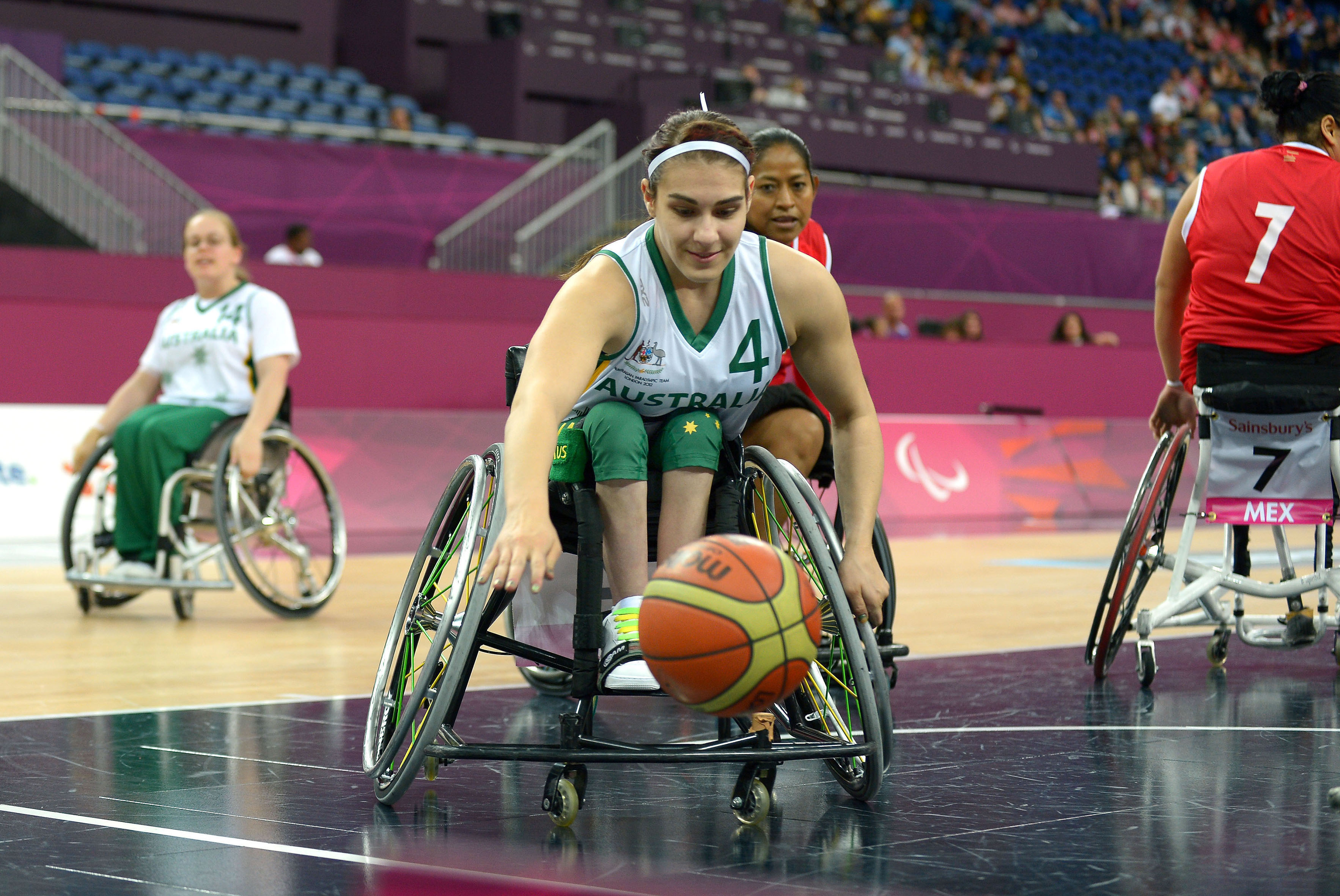
Vinci at the 2012 London Paralympics

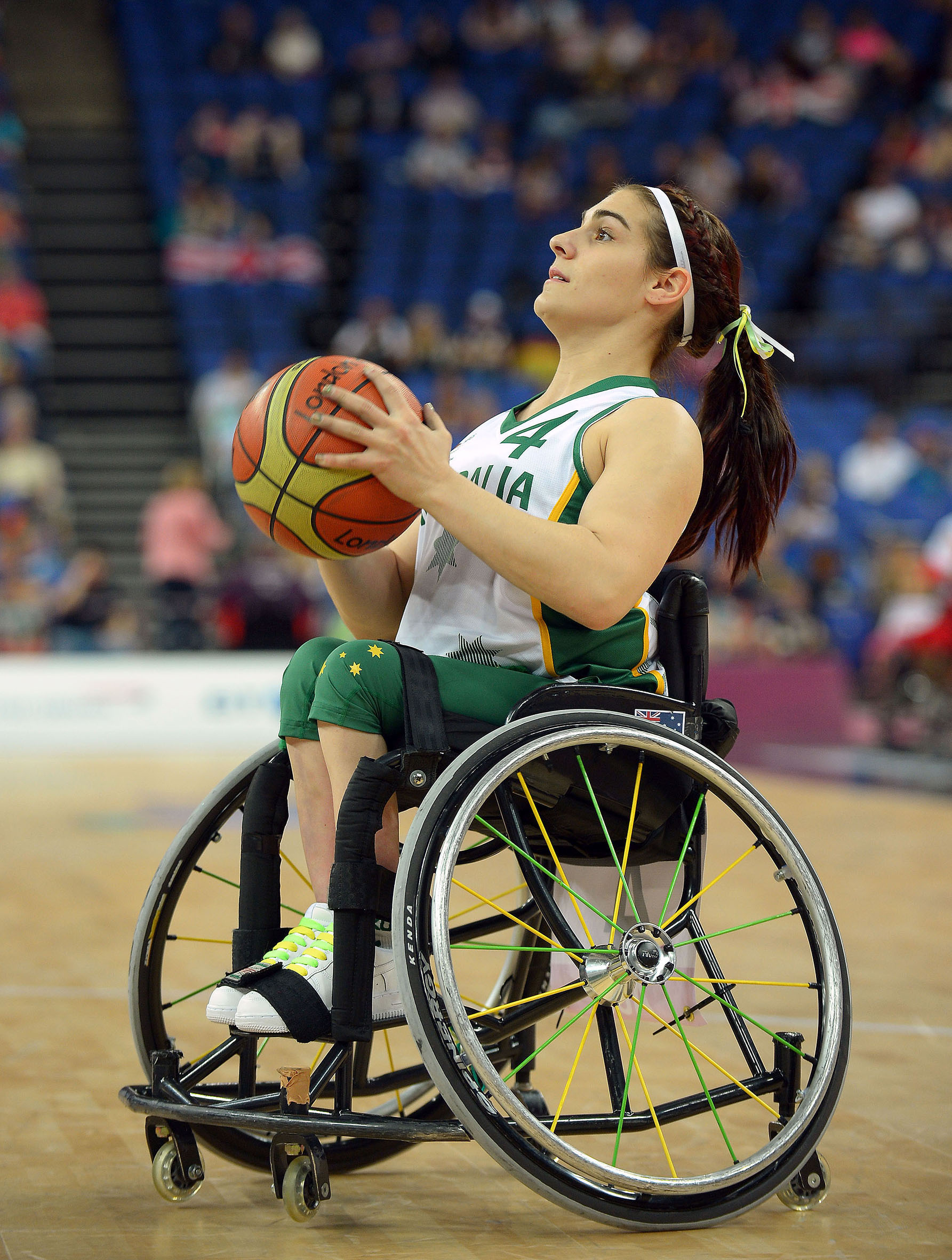
Vinci at the 2012 London Paralympics

Wikinews reporters interview Australian Glider Leanne Del Toso, Sarah Vinci, Amber Merritt and Clare Nott

Vinci is a 1 point wheelchair basketball player. She started playing wheelchair basketball in 2006. Vinci joined the Perth Western Stars in the Women's National Wheelchair Basketball League (WNWBL) in 2009, and has been with the club into the 2013 season. In 2010, she won the league's junior championship, the Kevin Coombs Cup, when her team beat the New South Wales side 63–58.

Vinci was selected to participate in a national team training camp in 2010, and made her debut with the national team, universally known as the Gliders, the following year, when she played in the Osaka Cup in Japan. She competed in the 2011 Asia Oceania Regional Championships, the 2011 U25 World Championships, and the 2012 BT Paralympic World Cup, competing in the final match against Germany.

Vinci was selected to represent Australia at the 2012 Summer Paralympics in wheelchair basketball. The London Games were her first. She attended a Paralympic farewell ceremony at Perth's State Basketball Centre in late July.

In the group stage, the Australia women's national wheelchair basketball team at the 2012 Summer Paralympics posted wins against Brazil, Great Britain, and the Netherlands, but lost to Canada. This was enough to advance the Gliders to the quarter-finals, where they beat Mexico. The Gliders then defeated the United States by a point to set up a final clash with Germany. The Gliders lost 44–58, and earned a silver medal.

At the 2013 Osaka Cup in Japan, Vinci and the Gliders successfully defended the title they had previously won in 2008, 2009, 2010 and 2012. She represented Australia at the 2018 Wheelchair Basketball World Championship where the team came ninth. At the 2020 Tokyo Paralympics, the Gliders finished ninth after winning the 9th-10th classification match. In June 2023, she was a member of the Gliders team at the 2022 Wheelchair Basketball World Championships in Dubai.

== Statistics ==
Season statistics
Competition	Season	Matches	FGM–FGA	FG%	3FGM–3FGA	3FG%	FTM–FTA	FT%	PF	Pts	TOT	AST	PTS
WNWBL	2009	17	16–39	41.0	–	0.0	2–6	33.3	9	34	1.8	0.4	2.0
WNWBL	2010	17	15–27	55.6	–	0.0	–	0.0	8	30	1.6	0.4	1.8
WNWBL	2011	19	35–106	33.0	–	0.0	3–13	23.1	14	73	3.3	1.5	3.8
WNWBL	2012	15	32–102	31.4	–	0.0	3–8	37.5	16	67	2.9	1.1	4.5
WNWBL	2013	19	31–91	34.1	–	0.0	4–11	36.4	17	66	1.8	0.4	2.0

Key
FGM, FGA, FG%: field goals made, attempted and percentage	3FGM, 3FGA, 3FG%: three-point field goals made, attempted and percentage
FTM, FTA, FT%: free throws made, attempted and percentage	PF: personal fouls
Pts, PTS: points, average per game	TOT: turnovers average per game, AST: assists average per game

== Gallery ==
Sarah Vinci
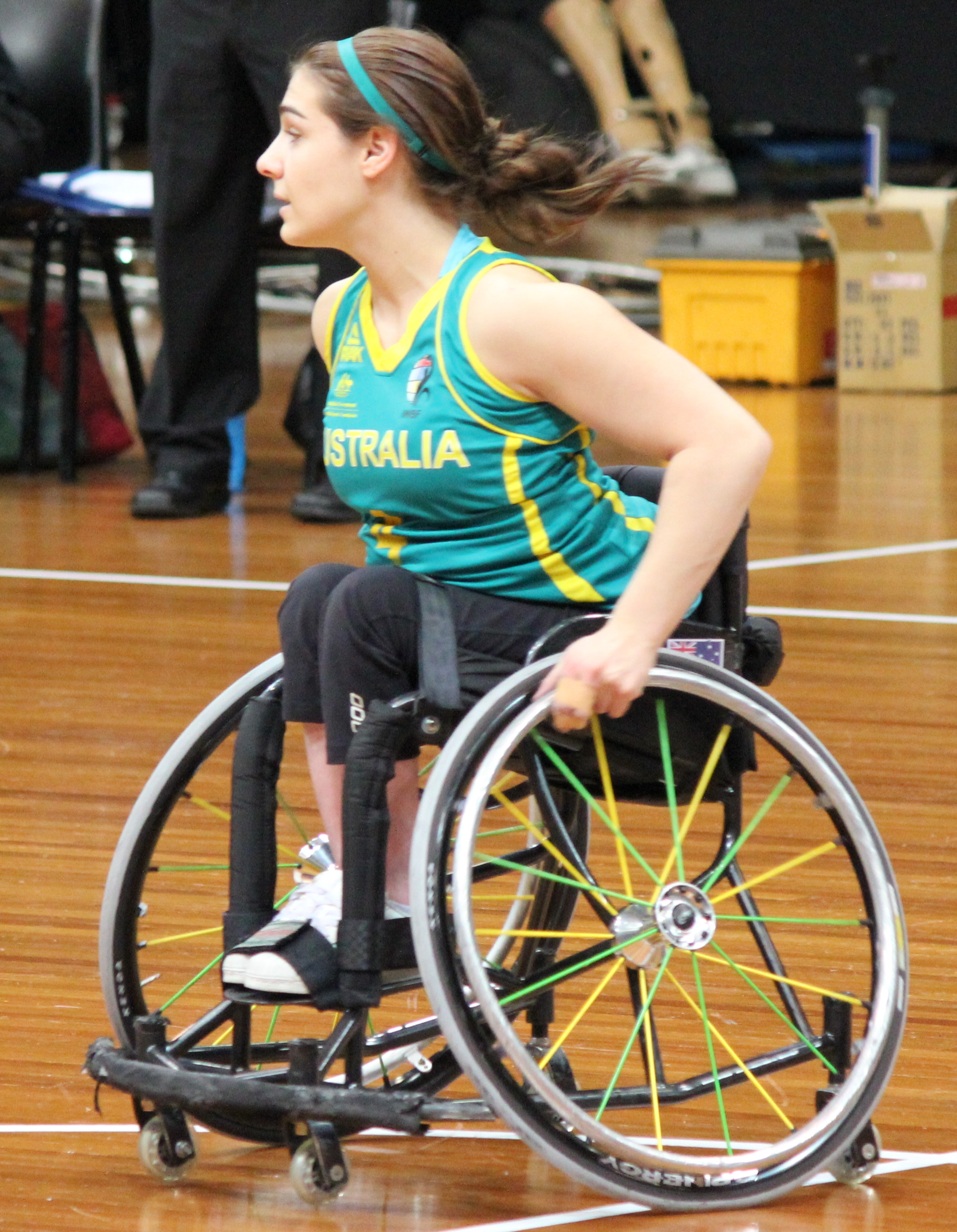
Sarah Vinci at the Gliders and Rollers World Challenge, Sydney, July 2013

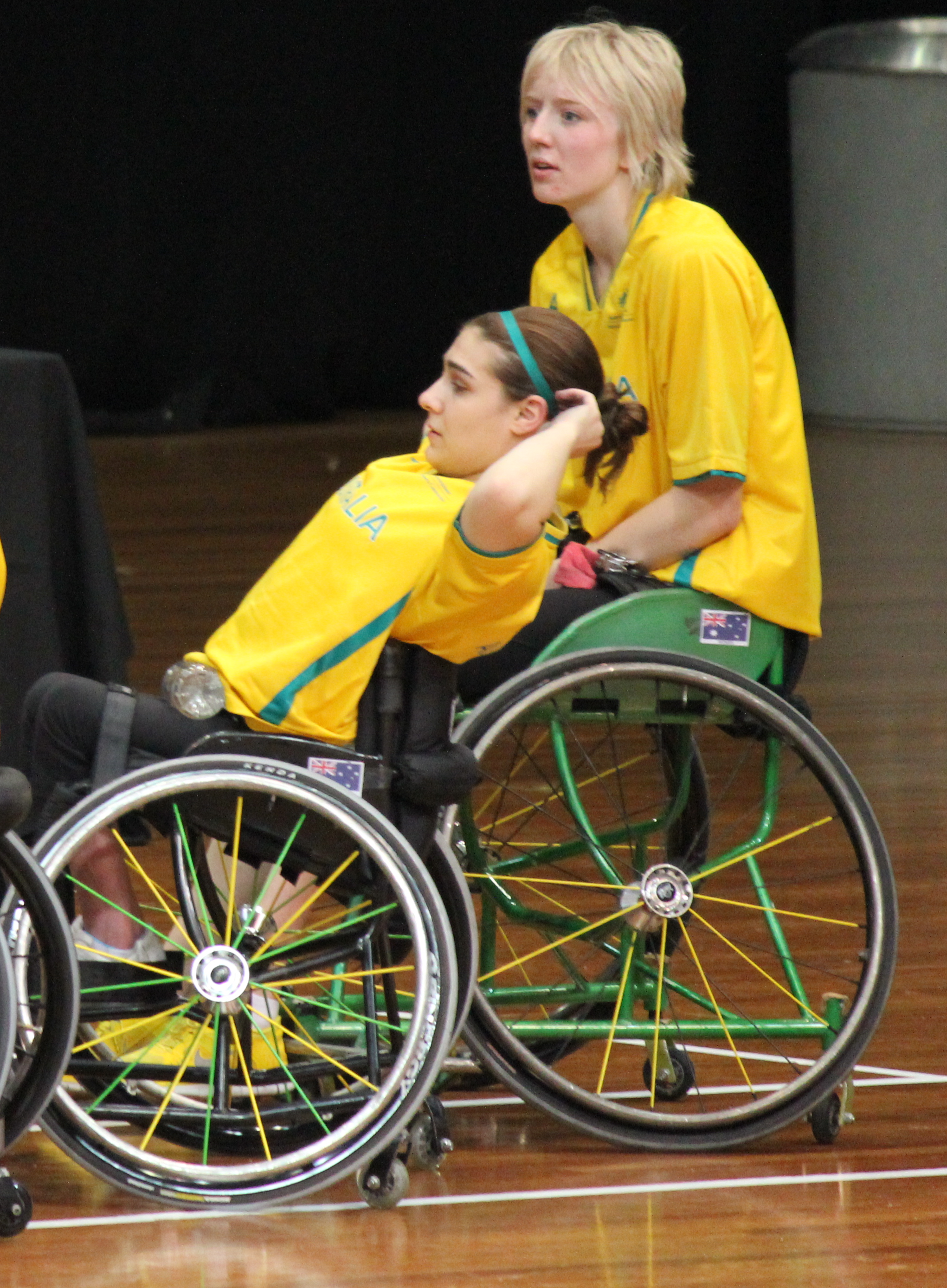
Vinci and teammate Amber Merritt during a time out at the 2012 Rollers & Gliders World Challenge in Sydney in July 2012

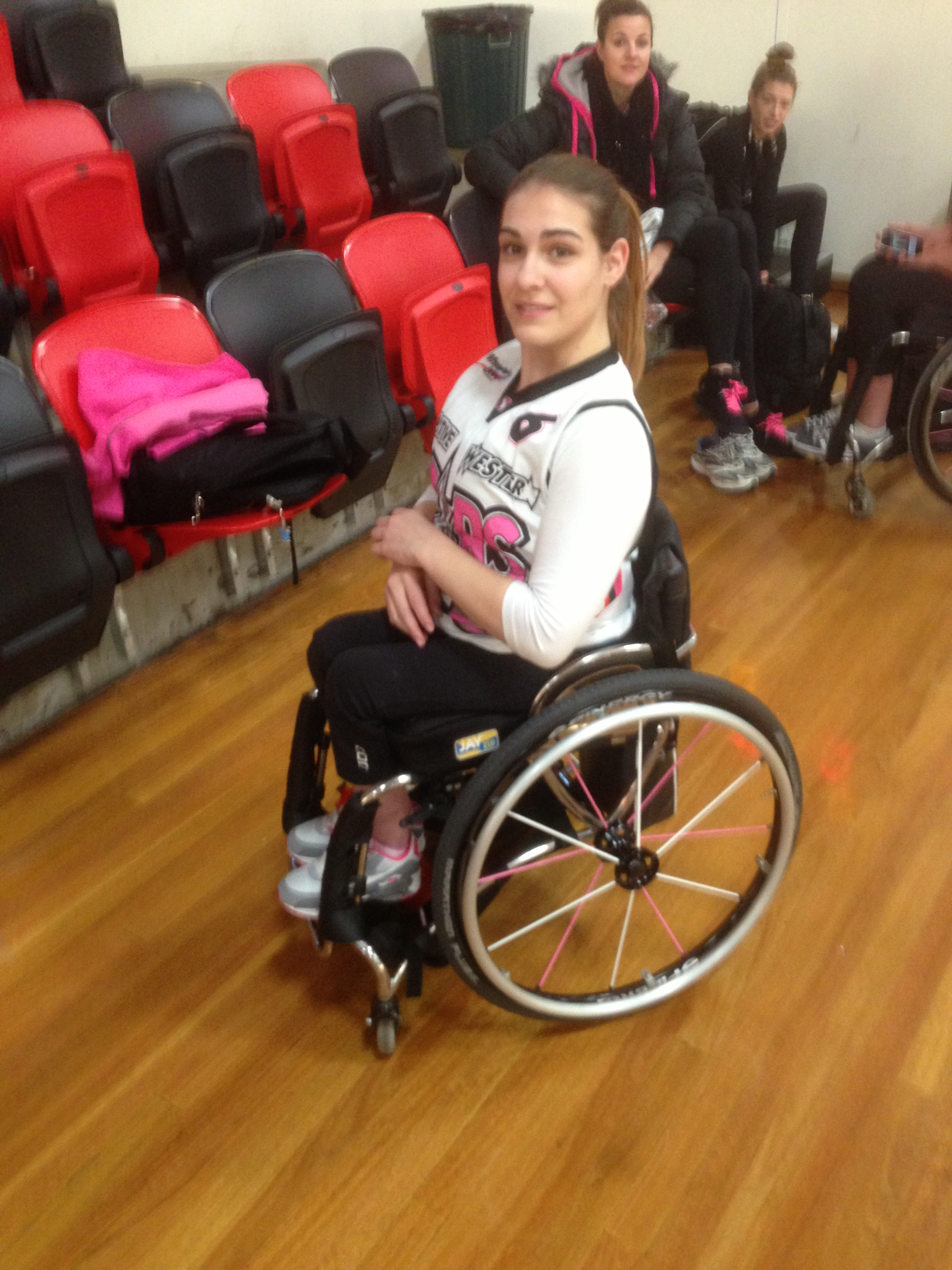
Sarah Vinci of the Western Stars women's wheelchair basketball team. Sydney, 14 July 2013
