= 3 point player =

Disability sport classification for wheelchair basketball

3-point player is a disability sport classification for wheelchair basketball. People in this class have good forward and backward trunk movement but poor to no sideways trunk movement. The class includes people with L2–L4 paraplegia and amputations. Amputees are put into this class generally if they have hip disarticulations or hip abductions. Players in this class can generally rebound balls that are over their heads, but they can have some issues with balance during lateral rebounds.

Classification into these classes has four phases. They are a medical assessment, observation during training, observation during competition and assessment. Observation during training may include a game of one on one. Once put into this class, it is very difficult to be classified out of it.

Players in this class include Australia's Tina McKenzie, Sarah Stewart and Katie Hill.

== Definition ==
This classification is for wheelchair basketball. Classification for the sport is done by the International Wheelchair Basketball Federation. Classification is extremely important in wheelchair basketball because when players point totals are added together, they cannot exceed fourteen points per team on the court at any time. Jane Buckley, writing for the Sporting Wheelies, describes the wheelchair basketball players in this classification as players having: "May have some limb movement more control of their trunk. They are quite limited in their sideways movement." The Australian Paralympic Committee defines this classification as: "Players with good trunk movement in the forward direction to the floor and up again without arm support. They have good trunk rotation but no controlled sideways movement." The International Wheelchair Basketball Federation defines a 3-point player as "Good trunk movement in the forward direction to the floor and up again without arm support. Has good trunk rotation but no controlled sideways movement." The Cardiff Celts, a wheelchair basketball team in Wales, explain this classification as, "excellent stability of the trunk in a forwards and backwards direction. [...] Typical Class 3 Disabilities include : L2–L4 paraplegia, with control of hip flexion and adduction movements, but without control of hip extension or abduction. Post-polio paralysis with minimal control of lower extremity movements. Hip disarticulation or above-knee amputees with very short residual limbs."

A player can be classified as a 3.5–point player if they display characteristics of a 3-point player and 4-point player, and if it is not easy to determine exactly which of these two classes the player fits in. For example, Australian Shelley Chaplin is classified as 3.5-point player.

== Strategy and on court ability ==
3-point players generally can grab, with both hands, rebounds over their head by moving their trunk forward. They have issues with balance when trying to laterally rebound the ball unless it is a one handed catch to the side of their chair. While navigating their chair on the court, they can move it forcefully without upsetting their balance. There is a significant difference in special endurance between 2-point players, and 3- and 4-point players, with 2-point players having less special endurance.

== Disability groups ==
People with amputations may compete in this class.

=== Amputees ===
People with amputations may compete in this class. This includes A1, A3 and A9 ISOD classified players. Because of the potential for balance issues related to having an amputation, during weight training, amputees are encouraged to use a spotter when lifting more than 15 pounds (6.8 kg).

==== Lower limb amputees ====
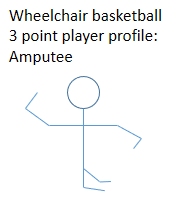
Profile of an A1 player who is classified as a 3 point player.

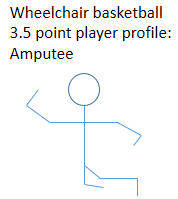
ISOD A3 classified player profile as a 3.5 point player

ISOD classified A1 players may be found in this class. This ISOD class is for people who have both legs amputated above the knee. There is a lot of variation though in which IWBF class these players may be put into. Those with hip articulations are generally classified as 3-point players, while those with slightly longer leg stumps in this class are 3.5-point players. Lower-limb amputations affect a person's energy cost for being mobile. To keep their oxygen consumption rate similar to people without lower limb amputations, they need to walk slower. A1 basketball players use around 120% more oxygen to walk or run the same distance as someone without a lower limb amputation.

ISOD classified A3 tend to be classified a 4-point players or 4.5-point players, though they could also be classified as 3.5 point players. The cut off point between the three classes is generally based on the location of the amputations. People with amputations longer than 2/3rds the length of their thigh are generally 4.5 point players. Those with shorter amputations are 4 point players. A3 players use around 41% more oxygen to walk or run the same distance as someone without a lower limb amputation. Players in this class can have issues with controlling their sideways movements.

Because of the potential for balance issues related to having an amputation, during weight training, amputees are encouraged to use a spotter when lifting more than 15 pounds (6.8 kg).

==== Upper and lower limb amputees ====
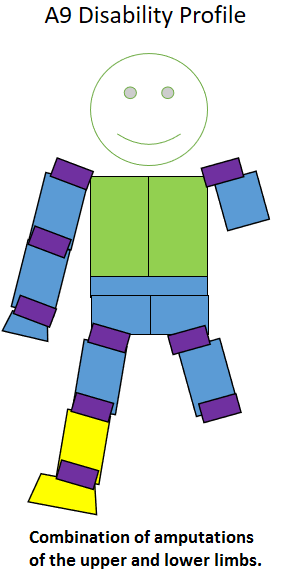
Type of amputation for an A9 classified sportsperson.

ISOD classified A9 players may be found in this class. The class they play in will be specific to the location of their amputations and their lengths. Players with hip disarticulation in both legs are 3.0-point players while players with two slightly longer above the knee amputations are 3.5-point players. Players with one hip disarticulation may be 3.5-point players or 4-point players. People with amputations longer than 2/3rds the length of their thigh when wearing a prosthesis are generally 4.5-point players. Those with shorter amputations are 4-point players. At this point, the classification system for people in this class then considers the nature of the hand amputation by subtracting points to assign a person to a class. A wrist disarticulation moves a player down a point class while a pair of hand amputations moves a player down two point classes, with players with upper limb amputations ending up as low as a 1-point player.

== History ==
The classification was created by the International Paralympic Committee and has roots in a 2003 attempt to address "the overall objective to support and co-ordinate the ongoing development of accurate, reliable, consistent and credible sport focused classification systems and their implementation."

Wheelchair basketball players who went to compete at the 2012 Summer Paralympics in this classification need to have their classification be in compliance with the system organised by the IWBF and their status being listed as ‘Review’ or ‘Confirmed’. For the 2016 Summer Paralympics in Rio, the International Paralympic Committee had a zero classification at the Games policy. This policy was put into place in 2014, with the goal of avoiding last minute changes in classes that would negatively impact athlete training preparations. All competitors needed to be internationally classified with their classification status confirmed prior to the Games, with exceptions to this policy being dealt with on a case by case basis. In case there was a need for classification or reclassification at the Games despite best efforts otherwise, wheelchair basketball classification was scheduled for September 4 to 6 at Carioca Arena 1.

== Getting classified ==
Classification generally has four phase. The first stage of classification is a health examination. For amputees in this class, this is often done on site at a sports training facility or competition. The second stage is observation in practice, the third stage is observation in competition and the last stage is assigning the sportsperson to a relevant class. Sometimes the health examination may not be done on site for amputees because the nature of the amputation could cause not physically visible alterations to the body. This is especially true for lower limb amputees as it relates to how their limbs align with their hips and the impact this has on their spine and how their skull sits on their spine. For wheelchair basketball, part of the classification process involves observing a player during practice or training. This often includes observing them go one on one against someone who is likely to be in the same class the player would be classified into. Once a player is classified, it is very hard to be classified into a different classification. Players have been known to have issues with classification because some players play down their abilities during the classification process. At the same time, as players improve at the game, movements become regular and their skill level improves. This can make it appear like their classification was incorrect.

In Australia, wheelchair basketball players and other disability athletes are generally classified after they have been assessed based on medical, visual or cognitive testing, after a demonstration of their ability to play their sport, and the classifiers watching the player during competitive play.

== Competitors ==
Australian Shaun Norris is a 3 point player. Tina McKenzie, Sarah Stewart and Katie Hill are 3-point players for Australia's women's national team. Yvon Rouillard is a 3-point player for the Canadian men's national team. Dave Durepos and Mickael Poulin are 3.5-point players for the Canadian men's national team. U.S. Senator-elect Josh Turek also was a 3.5-point player during his career.

== Variants ==
Wheelchair Twin Basketball is a major variant of wheelchair basketball. This version is supposed by the International Stoke Mandeville Wheelchair Sports Federation, and played in Japan. Twin basketball has a three-point classification system based on the evaluation of the mobility of people with cervical cord injuries. In this variant, the equivalent to 3-point players would be players without a head band. These players are "Players without a headband (no band players) - the players possess good triceps, a good balance of the hand and some finger functions. They can score by shooting with a smaller and lighter basketball to the normal basket."
