= 1 point player =

Disability classification for wheelchair basketball

1 point player is a disability sport classification for wheelchair basketball. It is for people who have significant loss of trunk control.

== Definition ==
This classification is for wheelchair basketball. Classification for the sport is done by the International Wheelchair Basketball Federation. Classification is extremely important in wheelchair basketball because when players point totals are added together, they cannot exceed fourteen points per team on the court at any time. Jane Buckley, writing for the Sporting Wheelies, describes the wheelchair basketball players in this classification as players having, "No lower limb and little or no trunk movement. Rebound overhead single handed." The Australian Paralympic Committee defines this classification as, "Players with little or no controlled trunk movement in all planes. Their balance in both forward and sideways directions is significantly impaired and they rely on their arms to return them to the upright position when unbalanced. One point players have no active trunk rotation." The International Wheelchair Basketball Federation defines a 1-point player as, "Little or no controlled trunk movement in all planes. Balance in both forward and sideways directions significantly impaired and players rely on their arms to return them to the upright position when unbalanced. No active trunk rotation." The Cardiff Celts, a wheelchair basketball team in Wales, explain this classification as, "significant loss of stability in the trunk so that (for example) the player would need to hold onto the chair (or wheel) with one hand whilst making a one handed pass or reaching for a rebound etc. whilst pushing Class 1 players will lean into the back of the wheelchair, with head movement forward and back with each push. Typical Class 1 Disabilities include : T1-T7 paraplegia without abdominal muscle control, post-polio paralysis with arm involvement and without control of trunk musculature." A player can be classified as a 1.5 point player if they display characteristics of a 1-point player and 2 point player, and it is not easy to determine exactly which of these two classes the player fits in. For example, Heidi Kirstie of Germany was a 1.5 point player.

== Rules ==
If a 1-point player fouls out of a game, their team is required to replace them in order to keep five players on the court. The team may need to make additional substitutions in order to ensure they do not exceed their point total of fourteen.

== Strategy and on court performance ==
One point players often play more minutes than other players because their low point value means another higher point player can be on the court. 4 point players can move their wheelchairs at a significantly faster speed than 1 point players. In games, 4 point players steal the ball three times more often than 1 point players. 1 point and 2 point players handle the ball the least on court.

Early on in the sports history, 1 point players would use strapping to connect themselves to their chairs and get better balance and give some semblance of trunk movement. This technique led to players in other classes using strapping to improve their functionality, especially in regards to strapping their feet. During the 1990s, there was a push to ban tilting in wheelchair basketball. One of the major arguments against its use was that 1 and 2 point players could not execute this move. This ban occurred in 1997, despite American 2 point player Melvin Juette demonstrating that it was possible for lower point players to execute at the 1997 IWBF 5 Junior Championships in Toronto, Canada. The tilting ban was lifted in 2006.

In a push to increase participation the sport, people involved with the National Wheelchair Basketball Association have argued allowing able-bodied athletes to compete would help 1 and 2 point players because there would be a need to balance participation on the team because of the rules regarding maximum points on the floor.

== History ==
The original classification system for wheelchair basketball was a 3 class medical one managed by ISMGF. Players in this system were class 1. Following the move to the functional classification system in 1983, class 1 players continued to be class 1 players.

The classification was created by the International Paralympic Committee and has roots in a 2003 attempt to address "the overall objective to support and co-ordinate the ongoing development of accurate, reliable, consistent and credible sport focused classification systems and their implementation."

In 2005 and 2006, there was an active effort by the National Wheelchair Basketball Association to try to move from a three player classification system to a four-point classification system like the one used by the International Wheelchair Basketball Federation.

For the 2016 Summer Paralympics in Rio, the International Paralympic Committee had a zero classification at the Games policy. This policy was put into place in 2014, with the goal of avoiding last minute changes in classes that would negatively impact athlete training preparations. All competitors needed to be internationally classified with their classification status confirmed prior to the Games, with exceptions to this policy being dealt with on a case-by-case basis. In case there was a need for classification or reclassification at the Games despite best efforts otherwise, wheelchair basketball classification was scheduled for September 4 to 6 at Carioca Arena 1.

== Variants ==
Wheelchair Twin Basketball is a major variant of wheelchair basketball. This version is supposed by the International Stoke Mandeville Wheelchair Sports Federation, and played in Japan. Twin basketball has a three-point classification system based on the evaluation of the mobility of people with spinal cord injuries. In this variant, the equivalent to one point players would be red band head players. These players are "functional are only mm. Biceps, small pectorals, delta and hand extensor. Missing are mm. triceps, hand flexion and all finger functions. They represent the most severe handicapped group of players."

== Getting classified ==
Wheelchair basketball players who are going to compete at the 2012 Summer Paralympics in this classification need to have their classification be in compliance with the system organized by the IWBF, and their status listed as "review" or "confirmed".

In Australia, wheelchair basketball players and other disability athletes are generally classified after they have been assessed based on medical, visual or cognitive testing, after a demonstration of their ability to play their sport, and the classifiers watching the player during competitive play.

Once a player is classified, it is very hard to be classified into a different classification. Players have been known to have issues with classification because some players play down their abilities during the classification process. At the same time, as players improve at the game, movements become regular and their skill level improves. This can make it appear like their classification was incorrect.

== Competitors ==
Australians Brendan Dowler and Tige Simmons are 1 point players. Melanie Domaschenz and Clare Nott are 1 point players for Australia's women's national team. Other 1 point players include Britt Tuns of Germany; Abdi Dini and Brandon Wagner are a 1-point players for the Canadian men's national team; and Chad Jassman and Tyler Miller are 1.5 point players for the Canadian men's national team.

== See also ==
- Wheelchair basketball classification
- Wheelchair basketball at the Summer Paralympics
