= Leanne Del Toso =

Australian wheelchair basketball player (born 1980)

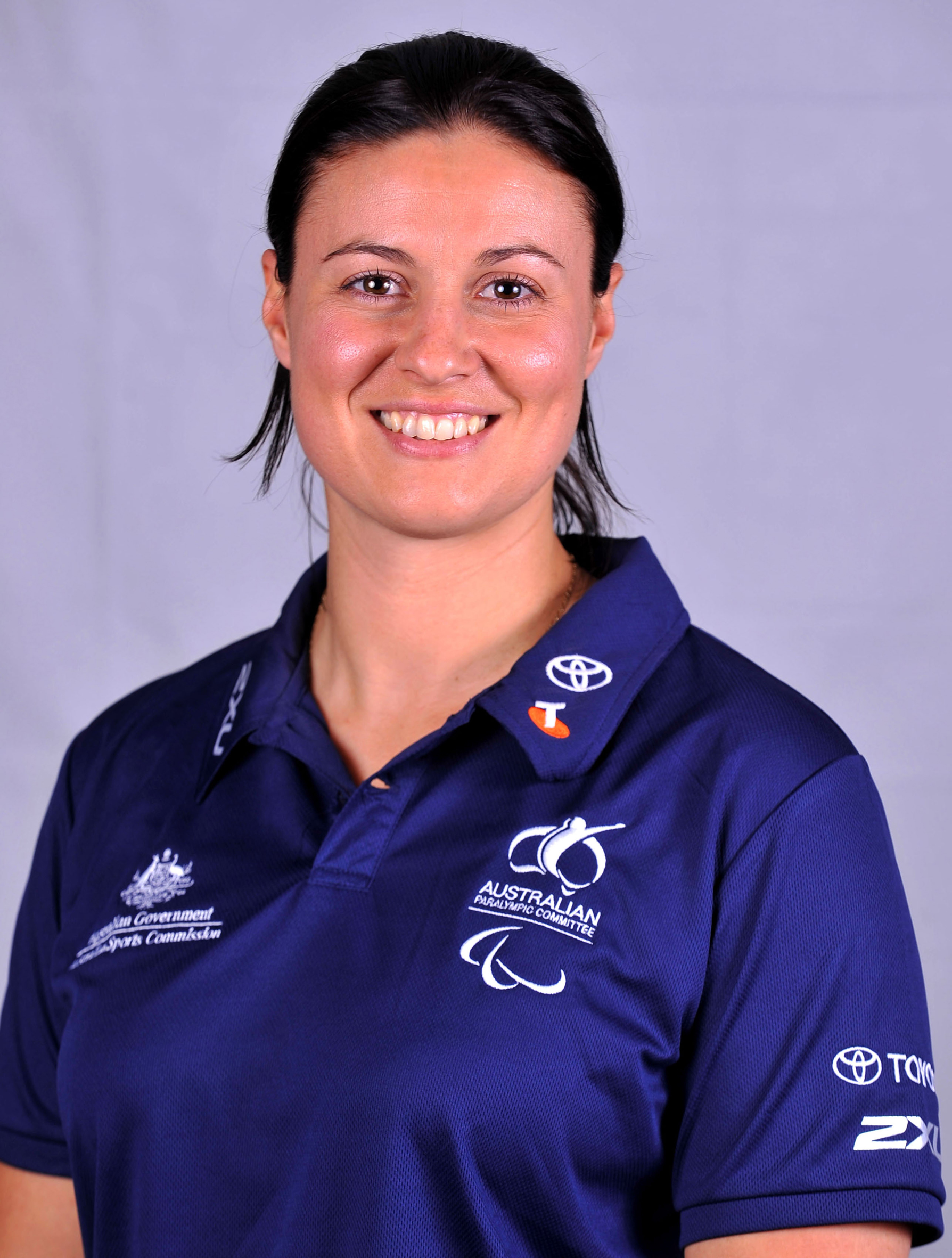
- 2012 Australian Paralympic team portrait of Del Toso

Personal information
- Born: 12 August 1980 (age 46)

Sport
- Country: Australia
- Sport: Wheelchair basketball
- Disability class: 3.5
- Event: Women's team
- Club: Victoria
Medal record
Wheelchair basketball
Paralympic Games
| Silver medal – second place | 2012 London | Wheelchair basketball |

Leanne Del Toso (born 12 August 1980) is a 3.5 point wheelchair basketball player who represented Australia at the 2012 Summer Paralympics in London, where she won a silver medal. Diagnosed with chronic inflammatory demyelinating polyneuropathy at the age of nineteen, Del Toso started playing wheelchair basketball in 2006. Playing in the local Victorian competition, she was named the league's most valuable player in 2007. That year started playing for the Knox Ford Raiders in the Women's National Wheelchair Basketball League (WNWBL). The following year, she was named the team's Players' Player and Most Valuable Player (MVP).

Del Toso has played for the Dandenong Rangers in the WNWBL since 2008. In the semifinal between her Dandenong Rangers and the Goudkamp Gladiators in 2009, she scored 31 points while pulling down 19 rebounds that saw the Rangers win 81–42. The Dandenong Rangers won back-to-back titles in 2011 and 2012.

Del Toso made her debut with the Australia women's national wheelchair basketball team, known as the Gliders, at the 2009 Osaka Cup in Japan. Since winning a silver medal in London, she has participated in the 2013 Osaka Cup in Japan, where the Gliders successfully defended the title they had won in 2008, 2009, 2010 and 2012.

== Personal life ==
Nicknamed Dori, Del Toso was born on 12 August 1980. At the age of nineteen, she was diagnosed with chronic inflammatory demyelinating polyneuropathy (CIDP), a condition that involves damage to the nerves. Del Toso has two siblings; her younger brother Daniel also developed the disease. Prior to her diagnosis, she played regular basketball. Del Toso has worked as a receptionist, and as a participation assistant for Basketball Victoria. As of 2013, she lives in Watsonia, Victoria.

== Wheelchair basketball ==
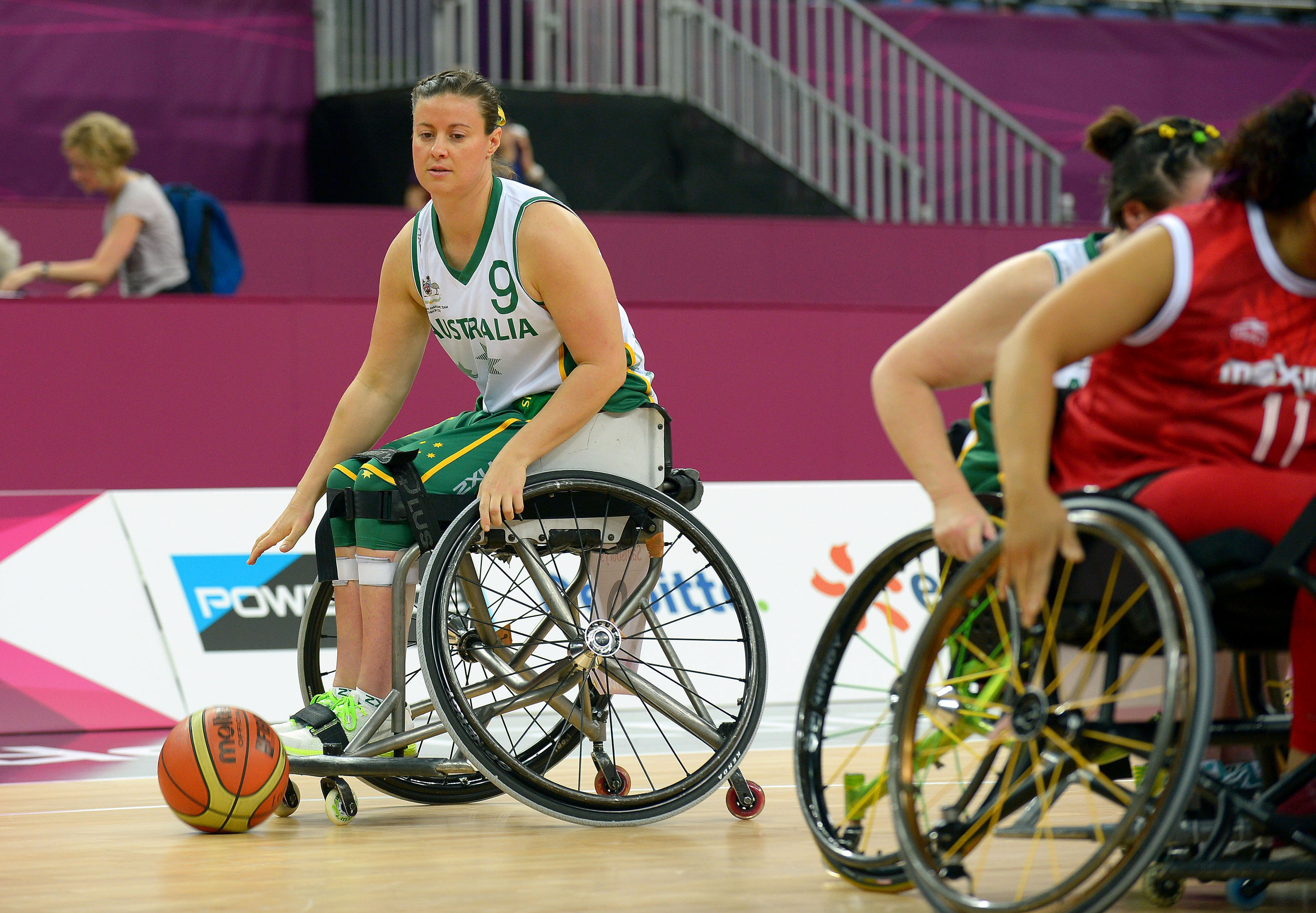
Del Toso at the 2012 London Paralympics

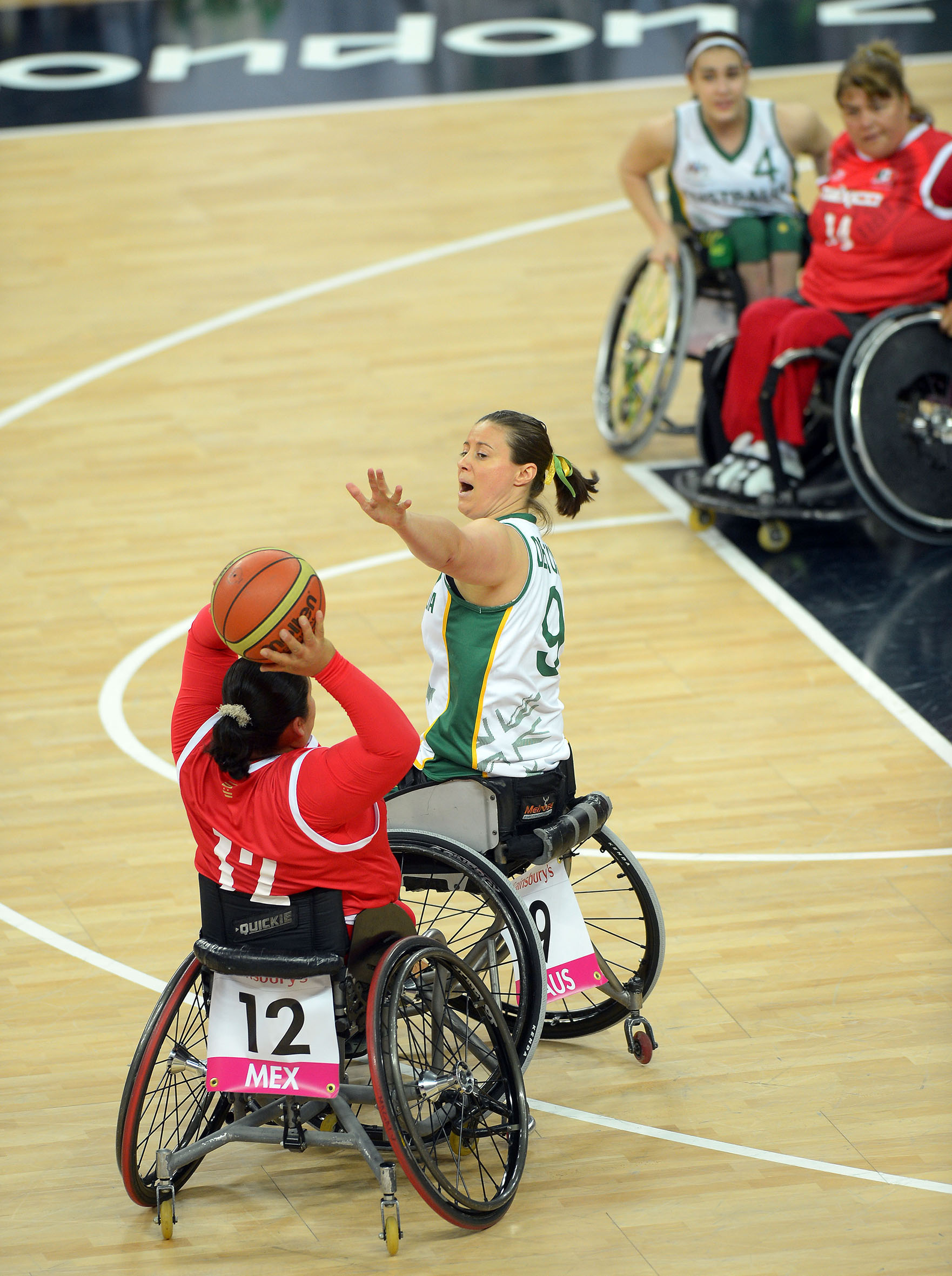
Del Toso at the 2012 London Paralympics

Wikinews reporters interview Australian Glider Leanne Del Toso, Sarah Vinci, Amber Merritt and Clare Nott

Del Toso was a 4 point wheelchair basketball player. Due to the progress of her disease, she was reclassified as a 3.5 point player in 2013. As of 2012, she has a scholarship with the Victorian Institute of Sport, and in financial year 2012/13, she received a A$20,000 grant from the Australian Sports Commission as part of its Direct Athlete Support (DAS) program. She received $17,000 in 2011/12 and 2010/11, $5,571.42 in 2009/10 and $5,200 in 2008/09. In 2012, she trained in Dandenong, Kew, Box Hill and Knox.

=== Club ===
Del Toso started playing wheelchair basketball in 2006. An Australian Paralympic Committee flyer on the wall at her local gym asking "Are you the next Paralympian?" prompted Del Toso to respond. She was advised to take up wheelchair basketball. Playing in the local Victorian competition in 2007, she was named the league's most valuable player. That year, she made her debut in the Women's National Wheelchair Basketball League (WNWBL) with the Knox Ford Raiders. At the end of the season, she was named the most improved player. She played for the Rangers (now known as Victoria) since 2008. In the second round of the 2008 season, the Dandenong Rangers defeated the Western Stars 53–47. She scored 20 points in her team's victory. In the second round of the 2008 season, playing for the Dandenong Rangers in a 38–72 loss to the Hills Hornets, she scored 12 points. That season, she was named the team's Players Player and Most Valuable Player (MVP).

In 2009, Del Toso played in the WNWBL finals. In the semifinal between the Dandenong Rangers and the Goudkamp Gladiators, she scored 31 points while pulling down 19 rebounds that saw the Rangers win 81–42. In 2010, she was named the Dandenong Rangers's Most Valuable Player. The Rangers won the WNWBL title in 2011. In a round four game in 2012, against Sydney Uni Flames that the Rangers won 55–44, she scored 14 rebounds. The Rangers won the league championship again that year.

=== National ===
In 2008, Del Toso was named as a reserve for the Australia women's national wheelchair basketball team, known as the Gliders, for the 2008 Summer Paralympics. She made her national team debut at the 2009 Osaka Cup the following year, when her team finished first. That year, she also participated in the Four Nations in Canada and the Japan Friendly Series, one of six players who played for the Dandenong Rangers in the WNWBL. She was selected to participate in a national team training camp in 2010. In July 2010, she played in a three-game test series against Germany. She was member of the Australian team at the 2010 World Championships that finished fourth. She also played in the 2010 Osaka Cup where her team finished first. She played in four games in the 2012 Gliders World Challenge.

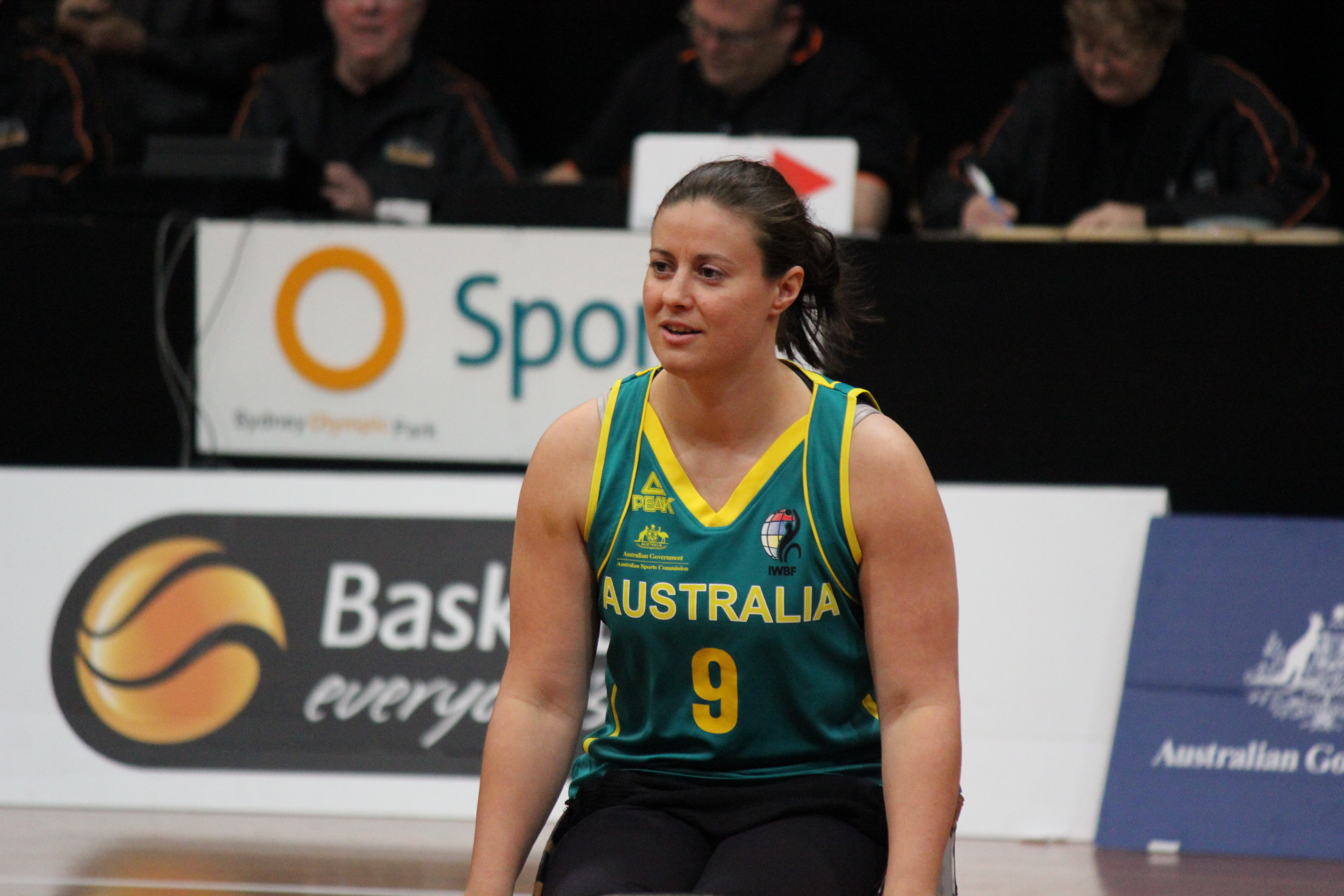
Del Toso at a game in Sydney in July 2012

Del Toso was selected to represent Australia at the 2012 Summer Paralympics in wheelchair basketball. The London Games were her first. In the group stage, the Australia women's national wheelchair basketball team at the 2012 Summer Paralympics posted wins against Brazil, Great Britain, and the Netherlands, but lost to Canada. This was enough to advance the Gliders to the quarter-finals, where they beat Mexico. The Gliders then defeated the United States by a point to set up a final clash with Germany. The Gliders lost 44–58, and earned a silver medal.

Since the games, Del Toso has participated in the 2013 Osaka Cup in Japan, where the Gliders successfully defended the title they had won in 2008, 2009, 2010 and 2012.

== Statistics ==
Season statistics
| Competition | Season | Matches | FGM–FGA | FG% | 3FGM–3FGA | 3FG% | FTM–FTA | FT% | PF | Pts | TOT | AST | PTS |
| WNWBL | 2009 | 17 | 115–254 | 45.3 | 0–7 | 0.0 | 30–63 | 47.6 | 46 | 260 | 13.6 | 2.6 | 15.3 |
| WNWBL | 2010 | 18 | 107–232 | 46.1 | 1–6 | 16.7 | 35–67 | 52.2 | 39 | 250 | 9.1 | 2.0 | 13.9 |
| WNWBL | 2011 | 18 | 117–217 | 53.9 | 0–1 | 0.0 | 15–42 | 35.7 | 29 | 249 | 7.8 | 2.4 | 13.8 |
| WNWBL | 2012 | 14 | 102–194 | 52.6 | 0–0 | 0.0 | 13–25 | 52.0 | 31 | 217 | 10.4 | 3.8 | 15.5 |
| WNWBL | 2013 | 12 | 80–151 | 53.0 | 0–0 | 0.0 | 16–24 | 66.7 | 25 | 176 | 82.5 | 3.1 | 14.7 |

Key
| FGM, FGA, FG%: field goals made, attempted and percentage | 3FGM, 3FGA, 3FG%: three-point field goals made, attempted and percentage |
| FTM, FTA, FT%: free throws made, attempted and percentage | PF: personal fouls |
| Pts, PTS: points, average per game | TOT: turnovers average per game, AST: assists average per game |
