= Clare Nott =

Australian wheelchair basketball player (born 1986)

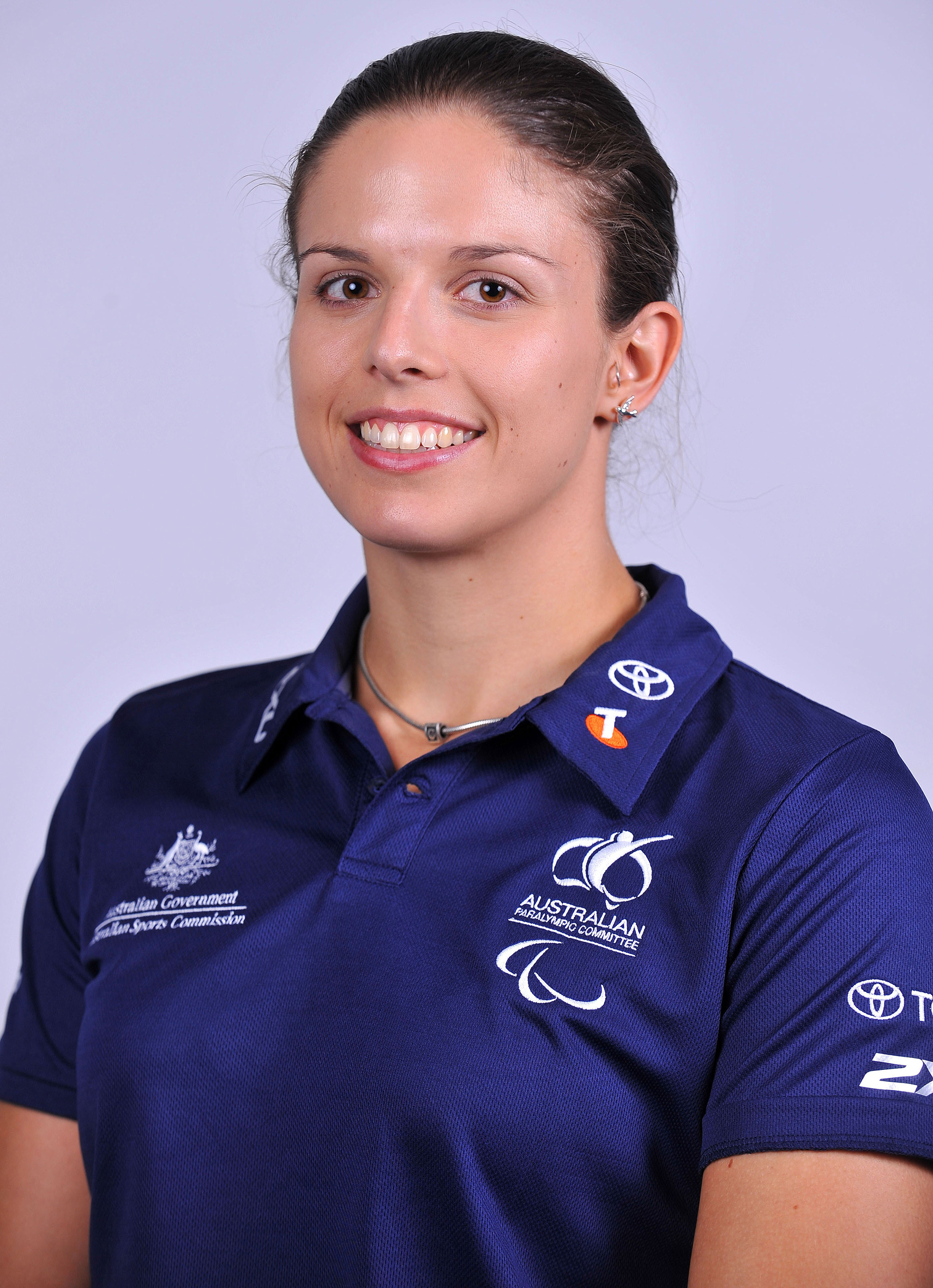
- 2012 Australian Paralympic team portrait of Nott

Personal information
- Nickname: Buzz
- Born: 11 August 1986 (age 40) Newcastle, New South Wales, Australia

Sport
- Country: Australia
- Sport: Wheelchair basketball
- Disability class: 1.0
- Event: Women's team
- Club: Kilsyth Cobras and Red Dust Heelers
Medal record
Women's wheelchair basketball
Representing Australia
Paralympic Games
Bronze medal – third place	2008 Beijing	Team competition
Silver medal – second place	2012 London	Team competition

Clare Nott (née Burzynski, born 11 August 1986) is a former Australian 1.0 point wheelchair basketball player who played for the Kilsyth Cobras in the Women's national Wheelchair Basketball League (WNWBL) and for the Red Dust Heelers in the mixed National Wheelchair basketball League (NWBL). She participated in the 2008 Summer Paralympics in Beijing, where she won a bronze medal, and the 2012 Summer Paralympics in London, where she won a silver medal.

A paraplegic as a result of a car crash, Nott was named the WNWBL's Best New Talent in 2005. She was the league's Most Valuable Player (MVP) in the 1 point class and a member of its All Star Five in 2009, 2010, 2011, 2013 and 2015. She has also won four National League premierships with the Wheelcats and two National Women's League premierships with the Western Stars (2013) and the Kilsyth Cobras (2015). She made her debut with the Australia women's national wheelchair basketball team, known as the Gliders, in a tournament in Canada in 2005, and has since played 141 international games. She won gold medals at the 2009, 2010 and 2012 Osaka Cups in Japan.

== Personal life ==
Clare Louise Burzynski was born in Newcastle, New South Wales, on 11 August 1986, the daughter of Eddie and Barbara Burzynski. She has an older sister, Lauren. All four members of the family were injured in a car accident on 28 June 1989, while holidaying in Queensland. Clare was treated at the hospital in Nambour, Queensland and then at the Royal Children's Hospital in Brisbane. It was discovered that her spinal cord was severed at the T8 spinal nerve, rendering her a paraplegic.

Burzynski was educated at Tranby College from 1996 to 2000, and at Ormiston College from 2000 to 2004. As of 2013 lives in Landsdale, Western Australia, and attended Murdoch University, where she graduated in 2013 with a Bachelor of Legal Studies and Criminology degree. She is married to Lee Nott, and works as a legal secretary. Before becoming a basketball player, she competed in swimming from 1998 to 2004.

== Basketball ==
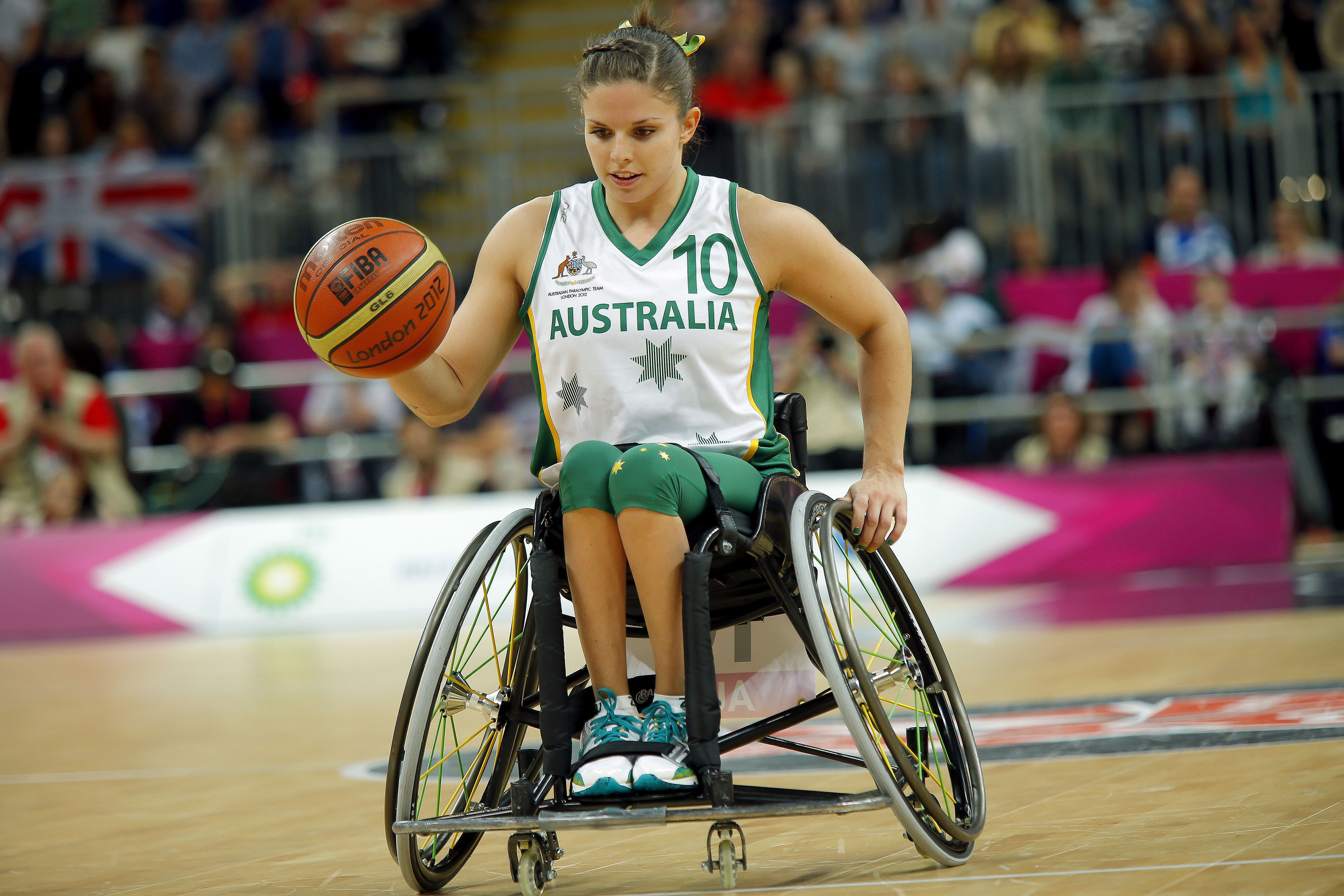
Nott at the 2012 London Paralympics

Nott is a 1.0 point player, who plays point guard. The Australian Sports Commission gave her a A$20,000 grant in financial year 2012/2013, and $11,000 in 2011/2012 as part of its Direct Athlete Support (DAS) program. She was a Western Australian Institute of Sport scholarship holder from 2009 to 2012.

=== Club ===
Nott plays club basketball for the Kilsyth Cobras in the Women's national Wheelchair Basketball League (WNWBL) and for the Red Dust Heelers in the mixed National Wheelchair basketball League (NWBL). In the WNWBL she played for the Queensland Comets from 2005 to 2006, the Western Stars since 2007 to 2014, and the Kilsyth Cobras since 2015. She won two Women's National League premierships with the Western Stars (2013) and the Kilsyth Cobras (2015). In the NWBL she played for the Brisbane Spinning Bullets in 2006, the Perth Wheelcats from 2007 to 2011, and the Red Dust Heelers since 2014. She has won four National League premierships with the Wheelcats.

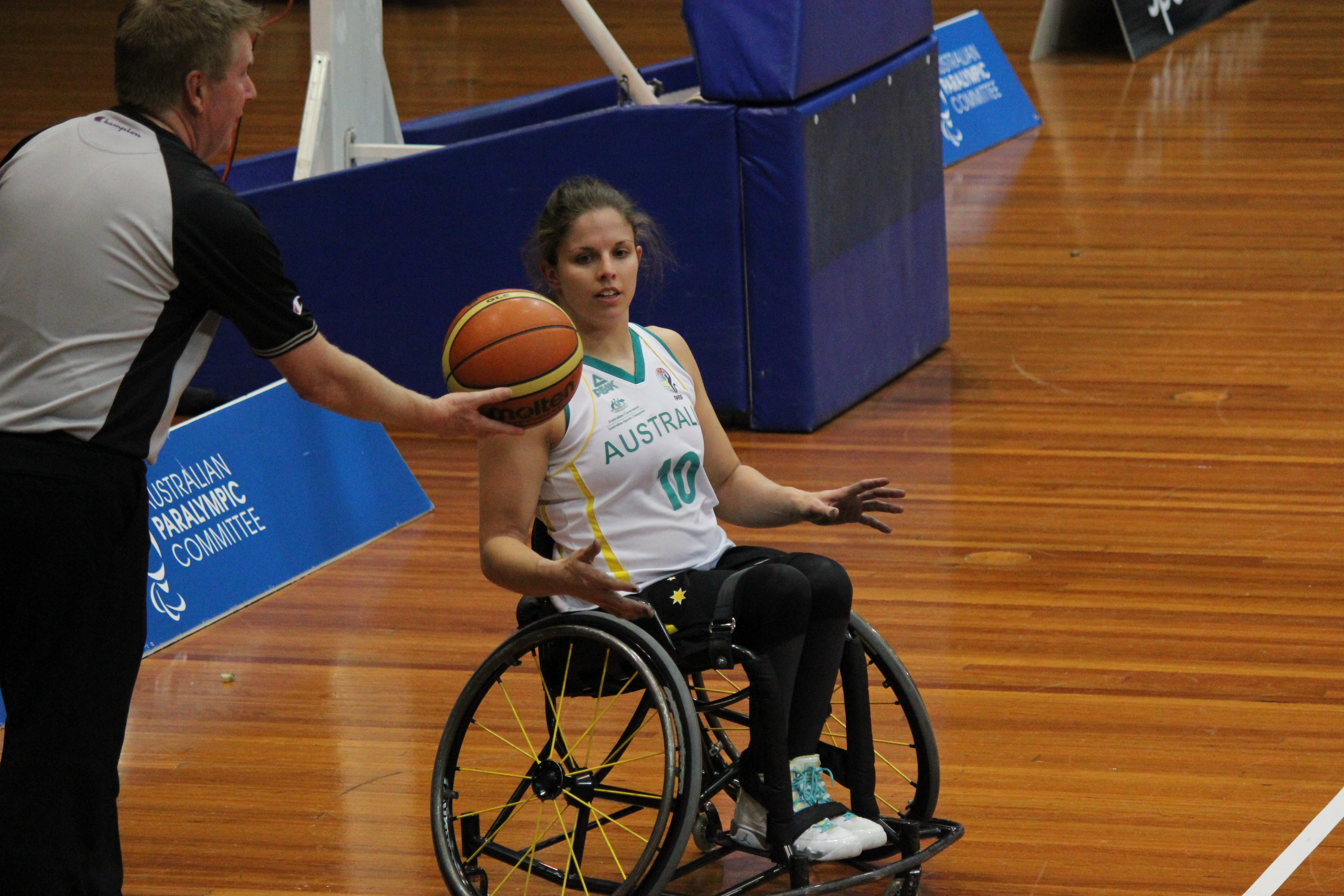
Clare Nott waits to be given the ball before a throw in

In 2005 Nott was named the WNWBL's Best New Talent. She was the league's Most Valuable Player (MVP) in the 1 point class and a member of the WNWBL All Star Five in 2009, 2010, 2011, 2013 and 2015. She was the first female to be named in a NWBL All Star 5 in 2014 while representing the Red Dust Heelers. She was also WNWBL Final Series MVP in 2015 while representing the Kilsyth Cobras. She names Alison Mosely, who helped her in the early stages of her basketball career, as her sporting heroine.

=== National team ===
An interview with Nott and three other members of the Gliders

Nott made her debut with the Australia women's national wheelchair basketball team, known as the Gliders, in a tournament in Canada in 2005. She also won gold medals at the 2009, 2010 and 2012 Osaka Cups in Japan. She was part of the bronze medal-winning Gliders team at the 2008 Summer Paralympics in Beijing, and the fourth-place finishing team at the 2010 World Championships. As of 2013, has played 141 international games.

Nott was part of the Australia women's national wheelchair basketball team at the 2012 Summer Paralympics in London. The Gliders posted wins in the group stage against Brazil, Great Britain, and the Netherlands, but lost to the Canada. This was enough to advance the Gliders to the quarter-finals, where they beat Mexico. The Gliders then defeated the United States by a point to set up a final clash with Germany. The Gliders lost 44–58, and earned a silver medal.

The team earned a silver medal at the 2015 Asia-Oceania Championship; however, they did not qualify for the 2016 paralympics in Rio.

Nott was named as one of the Women’s All-Star Five at the 2017 IWBF Asia Oceania Championships.

Nott retired from the National Team in May 2019; her final game was against Spain.

In 2024, she works as a public speaker in Perth.

== Statistics ==
Season statistics
Competition	Season	Matches	FGM–FGA	FG%	3FGM–3FGA	3FG%	FTM–FTA	FT%	PF	Pts	TOT	AST	PTS
WNWBL	2009	17	43–98	43.9	—	0.0	1–10	10.0	34	87	5.8	3.3	5.1
WNWBL	2010	17	35–72	48.6	—	0.0	2–7	28.6	23	72	5.9	3.1	4.2
WNWBL	2011	19	74–191	38.7	—	0.0	7–29	24.1	38	155	4.9	5.1	8.2
WNWBL	2012	15	35–116	30.2	—	0.0	1–12	8.3	33	71	4.9	4.7	4.7
WNWBL	2013	12	43–82	52.4	—	0.0	---	14.3	19	87	5.1	6.5	7.3
WNWBL	2014	1	5-8	62	—	0.0	1–7	---	---	---	1	---	---
WNWBL	2015	1	2-7	29	—	0.0	1	---	---	---	---	---	---
WNWBL	2016	15	21-47	45	—	0.0	1–2	50	---	---	1.4	0.53	---
WNWBL	2017	3	4-7	57.14	—	0.0	---	---	---	---	2.67	1	---
WNWBL	2018	3	4-11	36.36	—	0.0	1	---	---	---	1.33	1.33	---
WNWBL	2019	3	3-6	50	—	0.0	---	---	---	---	1.67	0.33	---

Key
FGM, FGA, FG%: field goals made, attempted and percentage	3FGM, 3FGA, 3FG%: three-point field goals made, attempted and percentage
FTM, FTA, FT%: free throws made, attempted and percentage	PF: personal fouls
Pts, PTS: points, average per game	TOT: turnovers average per game, AST: assists average per game
