= Sarah Stewart (basketball) =

Wheelchair basketball player of Australia (born 1976)

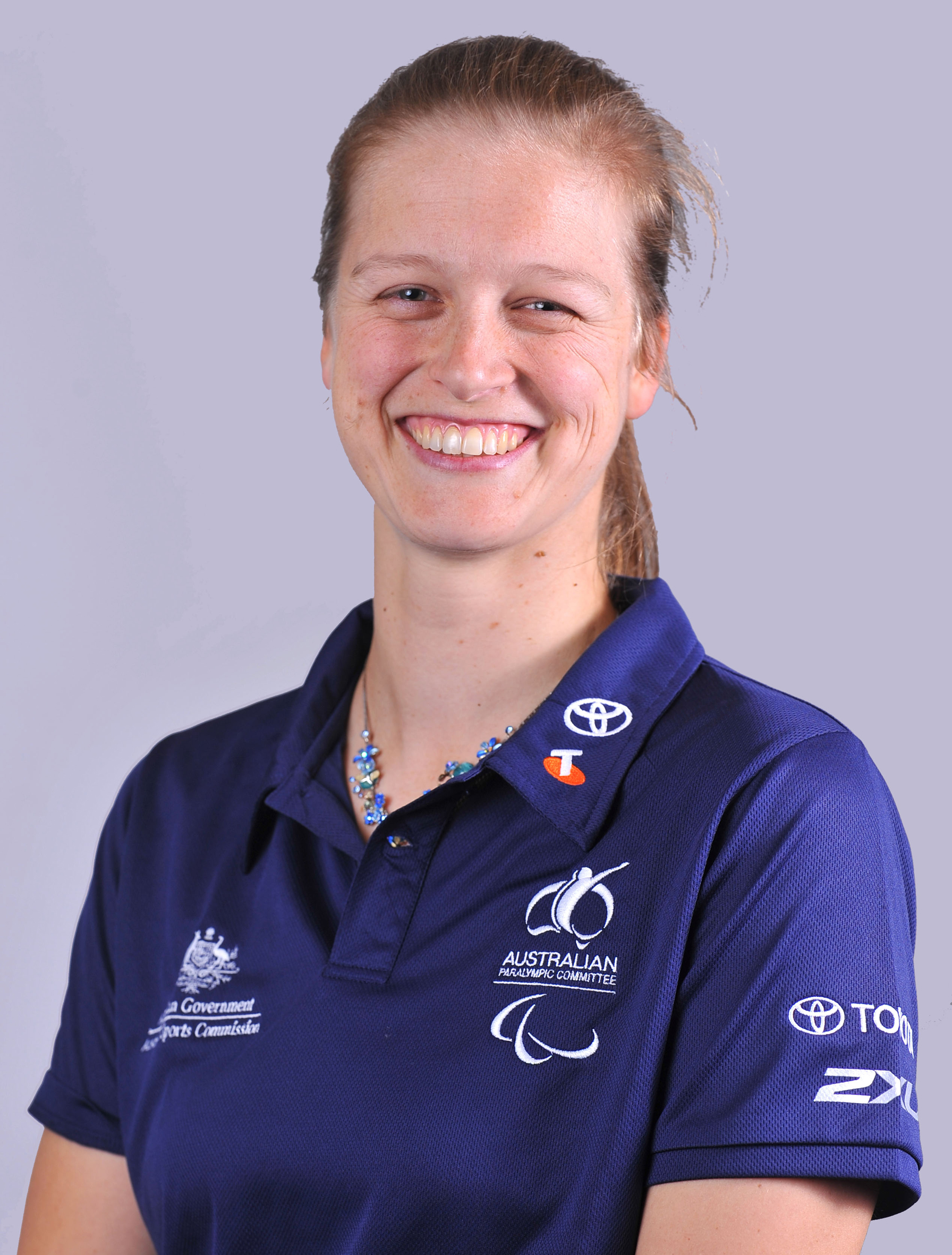
- 2012 Australian Paralympic team portrait of Stewart

Personal information
- Born: 13 June 1976 (age 50)

Sport
- Country: Australia
- Sport: Wheelchair basketball
- Disability class: 3.0
- Event: Women's team
- Club: Sydney University Flames
Medal record
Wheelchair basketball
Paralympic Games
Silver medal – second place	2004 Athens	Women's wheelchair basketball
Bronze medal – third place	2008 Beijing	Women's wheelchair basketball
Silver medal – second place	2012 London	Women's wheelchair basketball

Sarah Stewart (born 13 June 1976) is a 3.0 point wheelchair basketball player from Australia. She participated in the 2004 Summer Paralympics in Athens, where she won a silver medal; in the 2008 Summer Paralympics in Beijing, where she won a bronze medal; and the 2012 Summer Paralympics in London, where she won a second silver medal.

Stewart has played in the Australian Women's National Wheelchair Basketball League (WNWBL) and the National Wheelchair Basketball League (NWBL) since 2002. She has won numerous awards, including being named to the 2004, 2008, 2009, 2010 and 2012 WNWBL All-Star Five; the 2009 and 2010 WNWBL Most Valuable Player (MVP) in the 3 point class; and the 2002 WNWBL Best New Talent. She was 2010 WNWBL Champion with the Sydney Uni Flames, and 2005, 2006, 2007, 2008, and 2009 WNWBL Champion with the Hills Hornets. She was the WNWBL's Highest point scorer in 2010. She was also a 2005 and 2004 NWBL Champion with the West Sydney Razorbacks.

Stewart was first selected to play for the Australia women's national wheelchair basketball team, known as the Gliders, in 2003. Since then she has played over 150 international games for Australia, winning gold medals at the Asia-Oceania 2012 and 2008 Paralympic Qualifiers, the Asia-Oceania 2006 World Cup Qualifiers, and the 2009, 2010 and 2012 Osaka Cup. She was named MVP of the 2012 Osaka Cup and was All-Star Five in the Four-Nation International in Sydney in 2007.

In 2022, Stewart was appointed Chair of Paralympics Australia Athletes Commission.

== Personal life ==
Stewart was born on 13 June 1976. When she was 17 years old she injured her right ankle when she tripped on the stairs. This developed into reflex sympathetic dystrophy. She then fractured a bone in her left leg, which set off dystrophy in that leg as well. This resulted in her needing a wheelchair for mobility. She plays the saxophone in a band. She attended University of New South Wales and Sydney University, where she took classes in Cognitive Science, English, and Philosophy. She has BSc (Honours) in Philosophy and Cognitive Science and a BA in English from the University of New South Wales.

Stewart earned the Sydney University Vice Chancellor's Award for Academic and Sporting Achievement in 2004, and the New South Wales Institute of Sport (NSWIS) University of Sydney Academic Excellence award in 2009. In 2012 she was a PhD candidate at the University of Sydney. She is a vegan and used Twitter to connect with others about being vegan.

== Wheelchair basketball ==
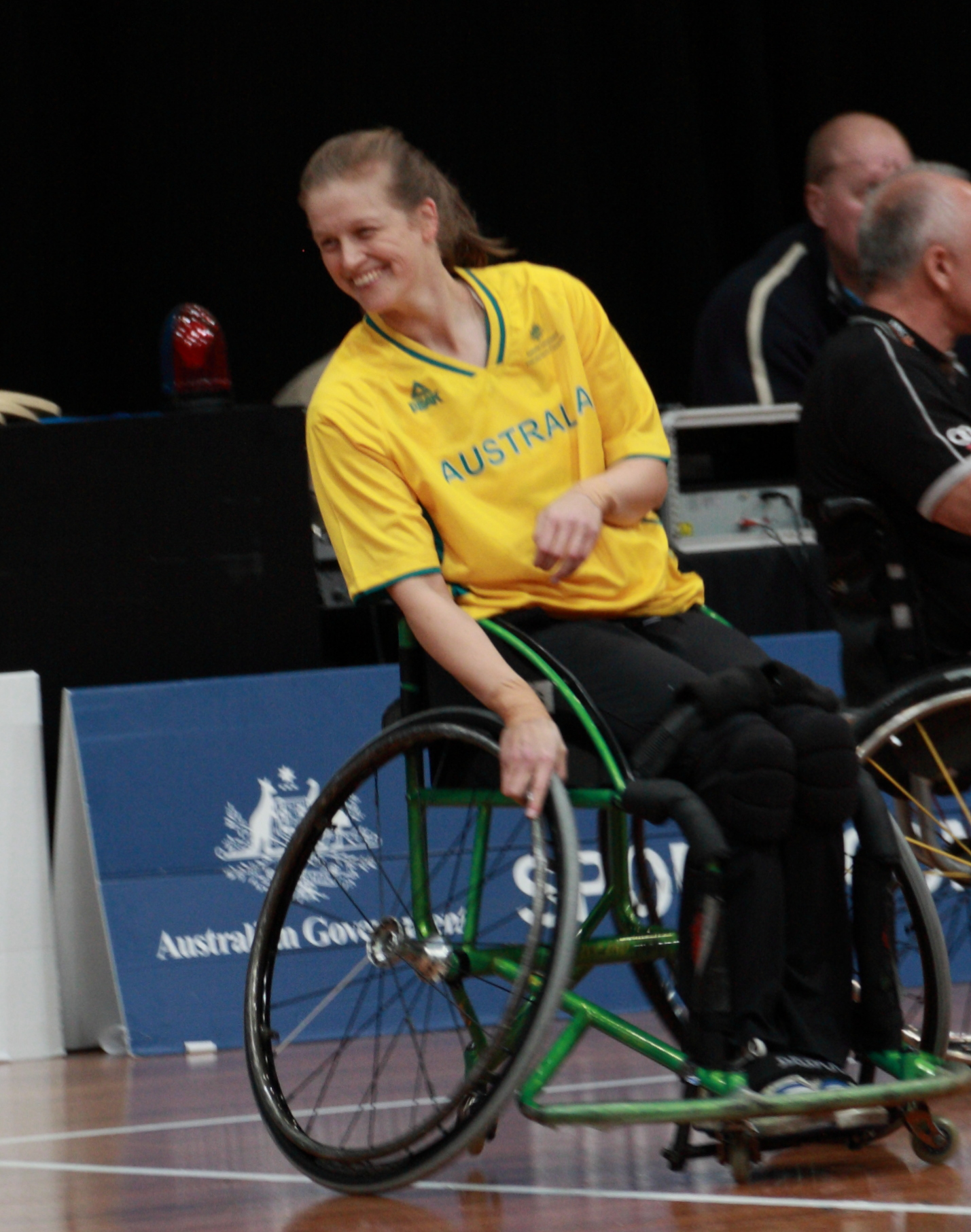
Stewart warming up before playing wheelchair basketball for the Australian Women's team at the Rollers & Gliders World Challenge in Sydney

Stewart is a 3.0 point player. She took up the sport while attending the University of NSW following a visit by a Wheelchair Sports NSW road show. "From the moment I jumped in the basketball chair and started playing", she later recalled, "it felt like Quidditch on wheels!" From 2003 to 2012, she had a scholarship with the New South Wales Institute of Sport.

=== Club ===
Stewart has played in the Women's National Wheelchair Basketball League (WNWBL) in Australia since 2002, with the North Sydney Bears from 2002 to 2004, the Hills Hornets from 2005 to 2010, and the Sydney University Flames since 2011. In the National Wheelchair Basketball League (NWBL), a mixed competition, she played for the West Sydney Razorbacks from 2002 to 2011. Since 2011 she has played for the Sydney University Wheelkings.

Stewart won the 2001 and 2002 Encouragement Award in the Women's National Club Championships. In 2002, she was also named the Most Valuable Player (MVP) of the Southern Challenge. She has won numerous awards, including named part of the 2004, 2008, 2009, 2010 and 2012 WNWBL All-Star Five; the 2009 and 2010 WNWBL MVP in the 3 point class; and the 2002 WNWBL Best New Talent. She was also the WNWBL's highest point scorer in 2010. She was part of the 2004 and 2005 NWBL Championship side with the West Sydney Razorbacks, the 2005, 2006, 2007, 2008, and 2009 WNWBL Championship winning Hills Hornets, and won the 2010 WNWBL Champion with the Sydney Uni Flames.

In the second round of the 2008 season, the Western Stars defeated the Hills Hornets 52–44. Playing for the Hornets, Stewart scored 20 points in her team's loss. Also in the second round that year, the team played the Dandenong Rangers, where Stewart scored 24 points in her team's 72–38 victory.

=== National team ===
Stewart was first selected to play for the Australia women's national wheelchair basketball team, known as the Gliders, in 2003. Since then she has played over 150 international games for Australia. Her international career highlights include gold medals at the Asia-Oceania 2008 and 2012 Paralympic Qualifiers, the Asia-Oceania 2006 World Cup Qualifiers, and the 2009, 2010 and 2012 Osaka Cup. She was named MVP of the tournament at the 2012 Osaka Cup, and was All-Star Five for the Four-Nation International in Sydney in 2007. She competed at the 2006 and 2010 World Wheelchair Basketball Championship. The Gliders finished fourth both times. She was selected to participate in a national team training camp in 2010.

==== Paralympics ====
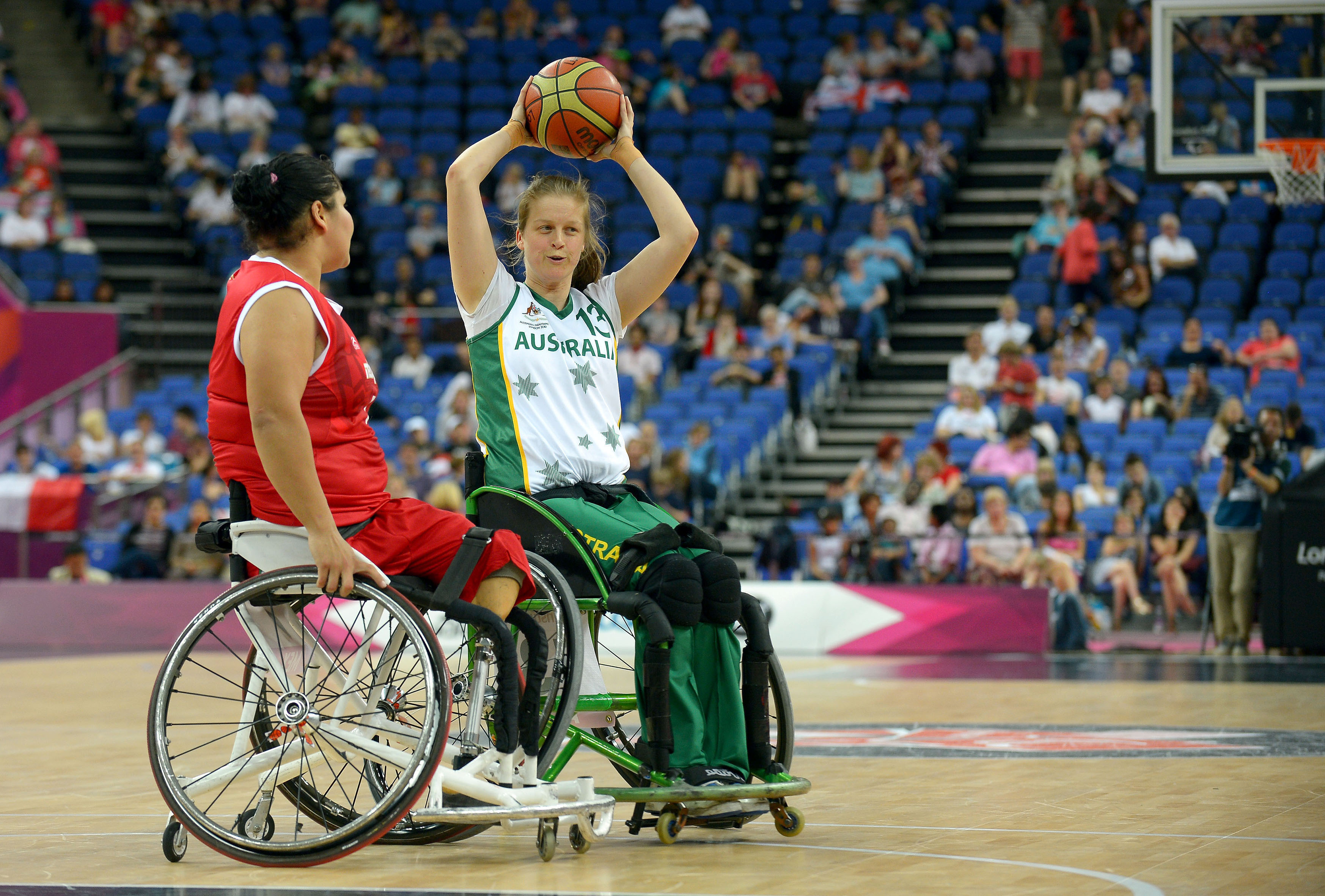
Stewart at the 2012 London Paralympics

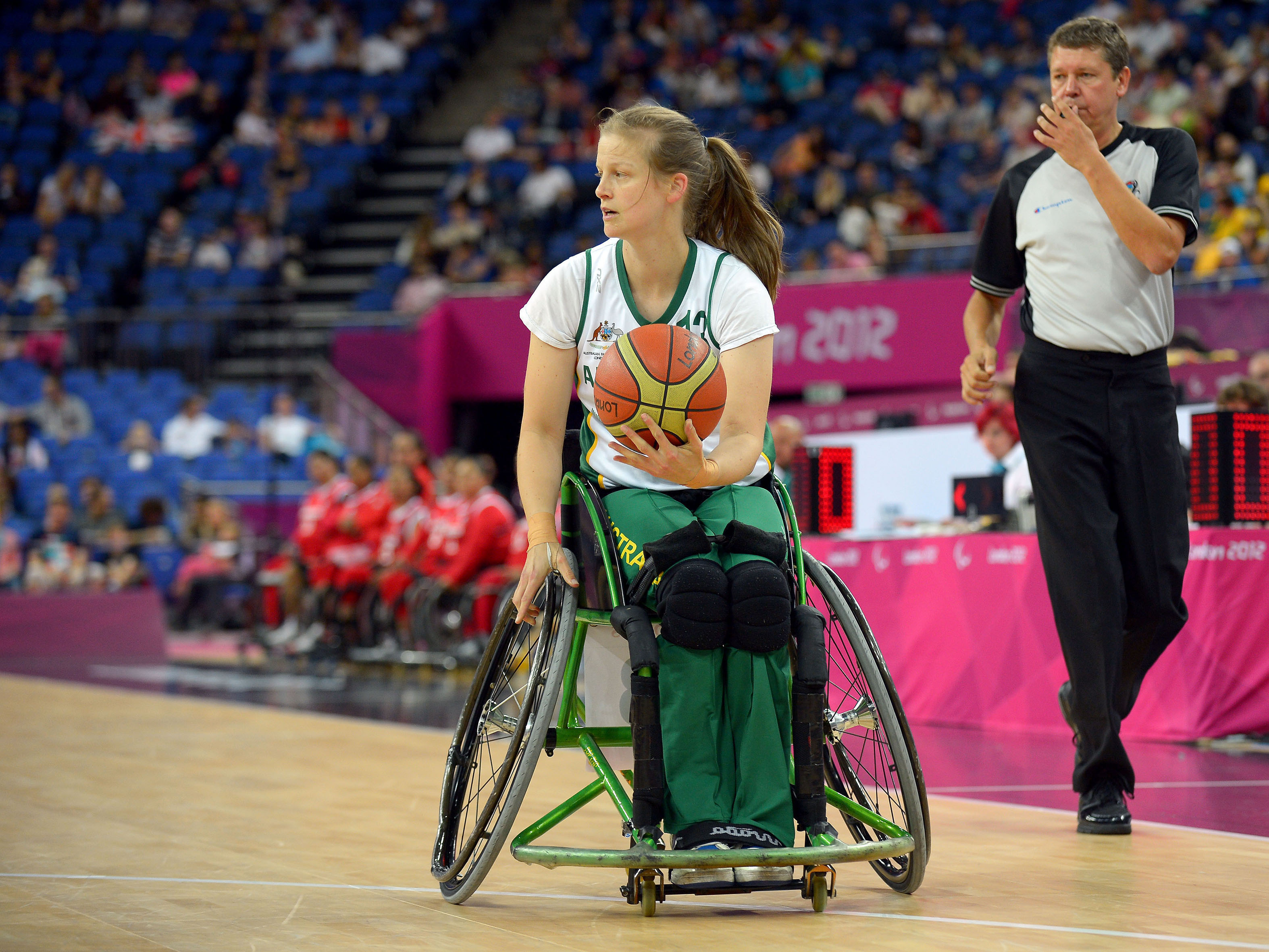
Stewart at the 2012 London Paralympics

Stewart was part of the silver medal-winning team, at the 2004 Summer Paralympics in Athens, and the bronze medal-winning team at the 2008 Summer Paralympics in Beijing. She played in the team's semi-final loss to the United States and was one of Australia's key defenders in the game.

Stewart was selected to represent Australia at the 2012 Summer Paralympics in London. In the group stage, the Australia women's national wheelchair basketball team at the 2012 Summer Paralympics posted wins against Brazil, Great Britain, and the Netherlands, but lost to the Canada. This was enough to advance the Gliders to the quarter-finals, where they beat Mexico. The Gliders then defeated the United States by a point to set up a final clash with Germany. The Gliders lost 44–58, and earned a silver medal.

== Statistics ==
Season statistics
Competition	Season	Matches	FGM–FGA	FG%	3FGM–3FGA	3FG%	FTM–FTA	FT%	PF	Pts	TOT	AST	PTS
WNWBL	2009	16	117–351	33.3	0–13	0.0	17–40	42.5	24	251	12.4	4.4	15.7
WNWBL	2010	14	98–275	35.6	0–7	0.0	14–41	34.1	29	210	12.7	4.1	15.0
WNWBL	2011	18	148–371	39.9	1–9	11.1	26–51	51.0	34	323	11.9	3.7	17.9
WNWBL	2012	18	170–380	34.7	0–16	0.0	23–45	51.1	30	363	12.6	4.1	20.2
WNWBL	2013	16	120–280	42.9	1–10	10.0	28–49	57.1	30	269	10.9	4.1	16.8

Key
FGM, FGA, FG%: field goals made, attempted and percentage	3FGM, 3FGA, 3FG%: three-point field goals made, attempted and percentage
FTM, FTA, FT%: free throws made, attempted and percentage	PF: personal fouls
Pts, PTS: points, average per game	TOT: turnovers average per game, AST: assists average per game
