= Alison Mosely =

Australian wheelchair basketball player

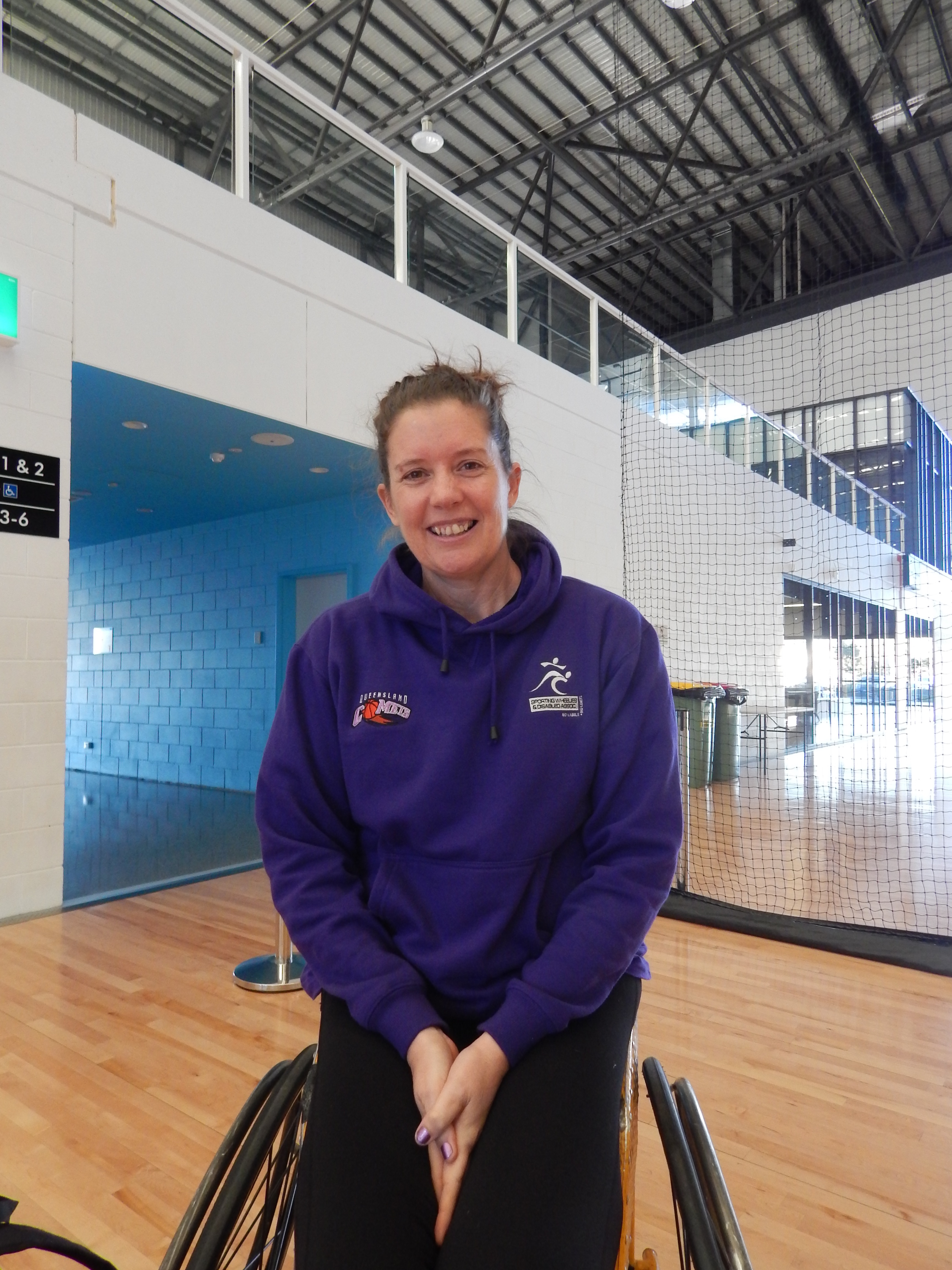
- Alison Mosely playing for the Minecraft Comets in Brisbane in 2017

Personal information
- Nationality: Australia
- Born: 17 August 1972 (age 53) Warwick, Queensland

Sport
- Club: Minecraft Comets
Medal record
Wheelchair basketball
Paralympic Games
| Silver medal – second place | 2000 Sydney | Women's wheelchair basketball |
| Silver medal – second place | 2004 Athens | Women's wheelchair basketball |

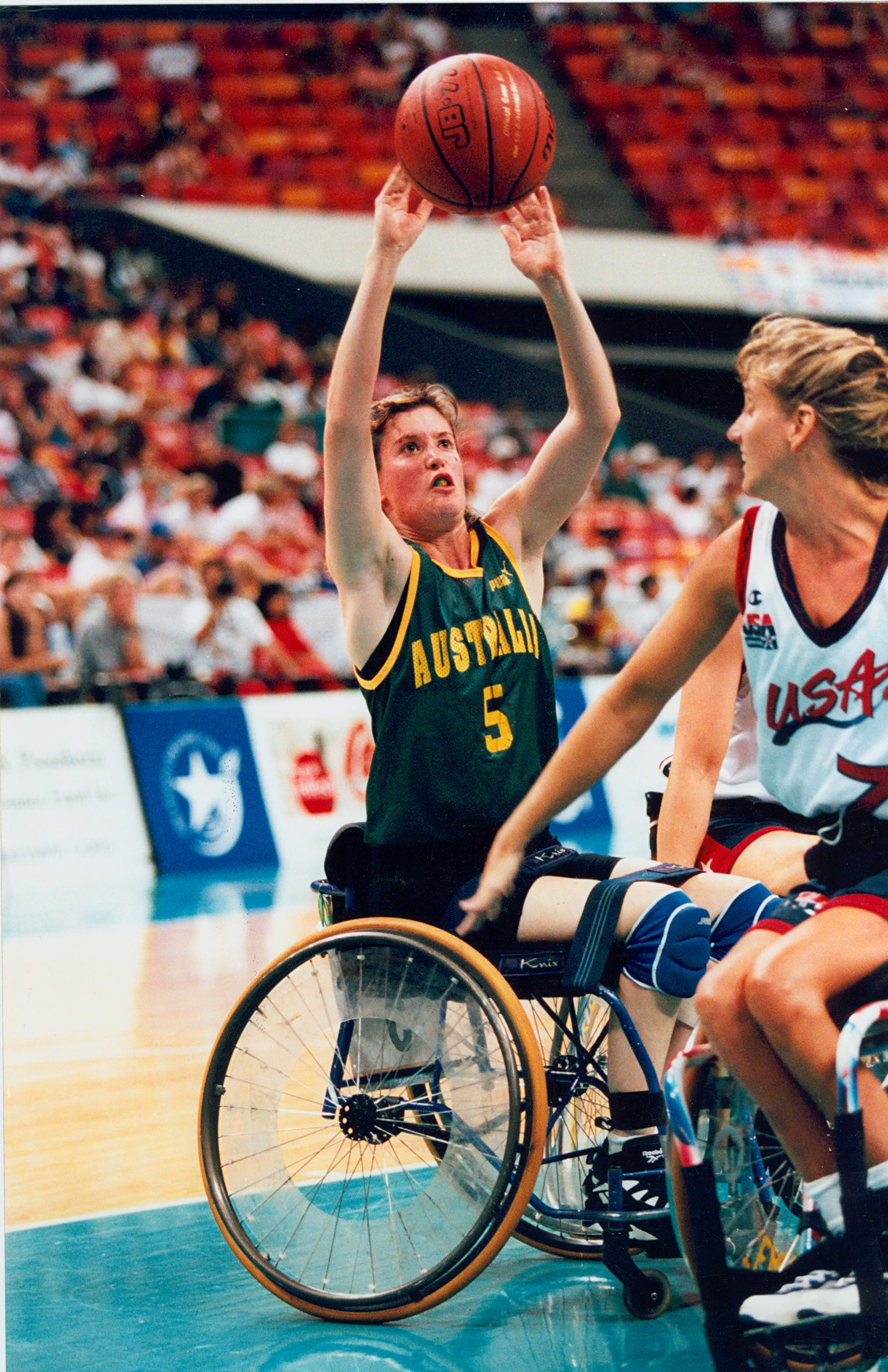
Australian women's wheelchair basketballer Alison Mosely passes the ball in the game against the US at the 1996 Atlanta Paralympics

Alison Mosely (born 17 August 1972 in Warwick, Queensland) is a wheelchair basketball player from Australia. She was part of the silver medal-winning Australia women's national wheelchair basketball team at the 2004 Summer Paralympics. She was part of the silver medal-winning Australia women's national wheelchair basketball team at the 2000 Summer Paralympics.
