= Australia women's national wheelchair basketball team at the 2012 Summer Paralympics =

- Coach: John Triscari
- 2012 Summer Paralympics: Silver
Home	Away

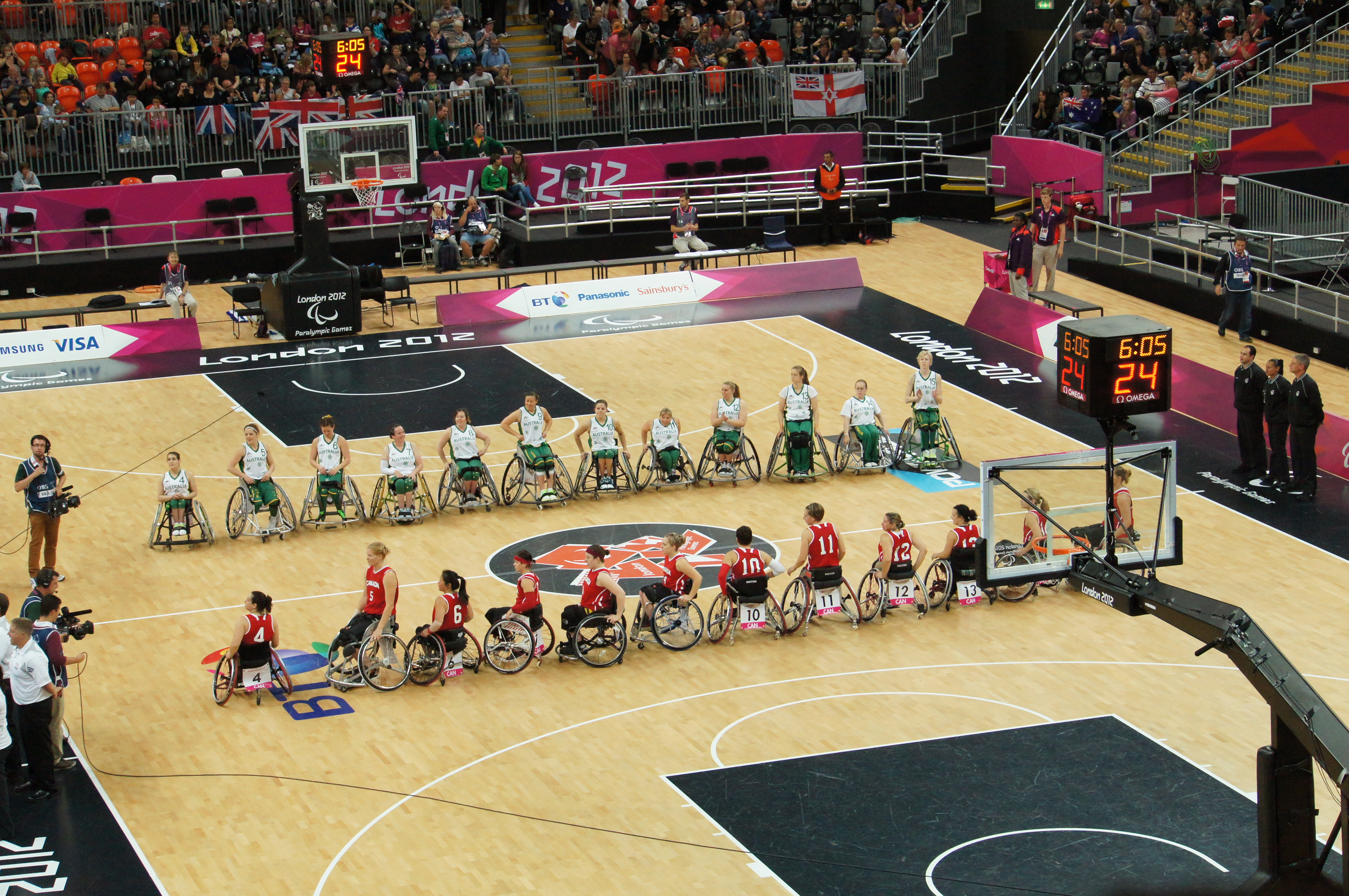
The Gliders (in green and white) line up for the national anthem in the match with Canada (in red).

The Australian women's national wheelchair basketball team, known as the Gliders, played in the 2012 Summer Paralympics in London. The team of twelve included nine Paralympic veterans with fifteen Paralympic Games between them: Bridie Kean, Amanda Carter, Sarah Stewart, Tina McKenzie, Kylie Gauci, Katie Hill, Cobi Crispin, Clare Nott and Shelley Chaplin. There were three newcomers playing in their first Paralympics: Amber Merritt, Sarah Vinci and Leanne Del Toso. Carter returned to the Gliders' lineup after being sidelined by a crippling elbow injury at the 2000 Summer Paralympics in Sydney. The Gliders had won silver in Sydney and the 2004 Summer Paralympics in Athens, but had never won gold.

The first stage of the Paralympic competition was the group stage, a round-robin tournament. The Gliders faced a formidable task just to make the finals, as their pool included Brazil, Great Britain, Canada and the Netherlands. Canada had beaten the Gliders in 2010, and the Netherlands was rated as one of the competition's best teams. After a narrow victory over Brazil, and an easier one against Great Britain, the Gliders were again defeated by Canada, but won their final match against the Netherlands to finish at the top of their pool. The Gliders went on to win the quarterfinal against Mexico and the semifinal against the United States, but lost to Germany in the final, winning silver.

== Background ==
Prior to the 2012 Summer Paralympics in London, the Australian women's national wheelchair basketball team, known as the Gliders, had won silver at the 2000 Summer Paralympics in Sydney and the 2004 Summer Paralympics in Athens, and bronze at the 2008 Summer Paralympics in Beijing, but had never won gold. The announcement of the membership of the Paralympic team was made on 5 July 2012. The team of twelve included nine veterans with 15 Paralympic Games between them: Bridie Kean, Amanda Carter, Sarah Stewart, Tina McKenzie, Kylie Gauci, Katie Hill, Cobi Crispin, Clare Nott and Shelley Chaplin. Amber Merritt, Sarah Vinci and Leanne Del Toso were newcomers competing at their first Paralympics. Kean, aged 25, was selected as their captain.

The oldest team member was Amanda Carter, aged 48, who was coming back for a fourth Paralympic games having competed in the 1992 Summer Paralympics in Barcelona, the 1996 Summer Paralympics in Atlanta and the 2000 Summer Paralympics in Sydney, at which she had been sidelined by a crippling elbow injury. She returned to the Gliders' lineup in 2009. The youngest, who had not even been born when Carter had played in Barcelona, was 19-year-old Amber Merritt. British-born Merritt was originally a swimmer, but had been recruited into basketball by Paralympic Hall of Fame coach Frank Ponta. Merritt had averaged 20 points and 8.4 rebounds per game in the Gliders' World Challenge series against Japan, Germany and China in Sydney in July 2012, including a game against Germany in which she scored 21 points and eight rebounds. Another young player from whom much was hoped was Cobi Crispin, who had been named Australian Women's Wheelchair Basketball International Player of the Year in 2011, and had since posted impressive performances in the May 2012 Paralympic World Cup in Manchester and the Gliders World Challenge.

2012 Australian women's national wheelchair basketball team
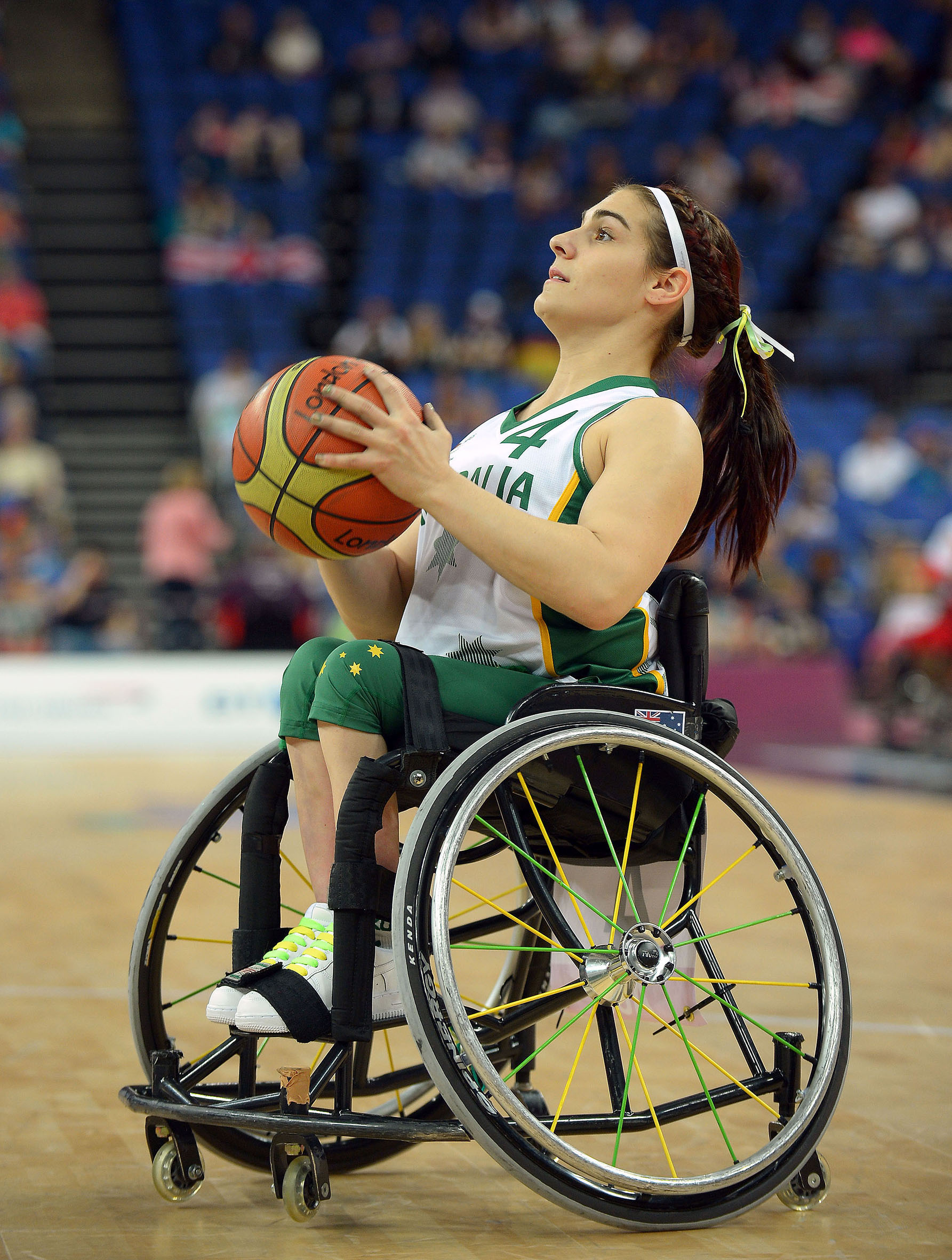
Sarah Vinci
Spearwood, Western Australia
35 international games

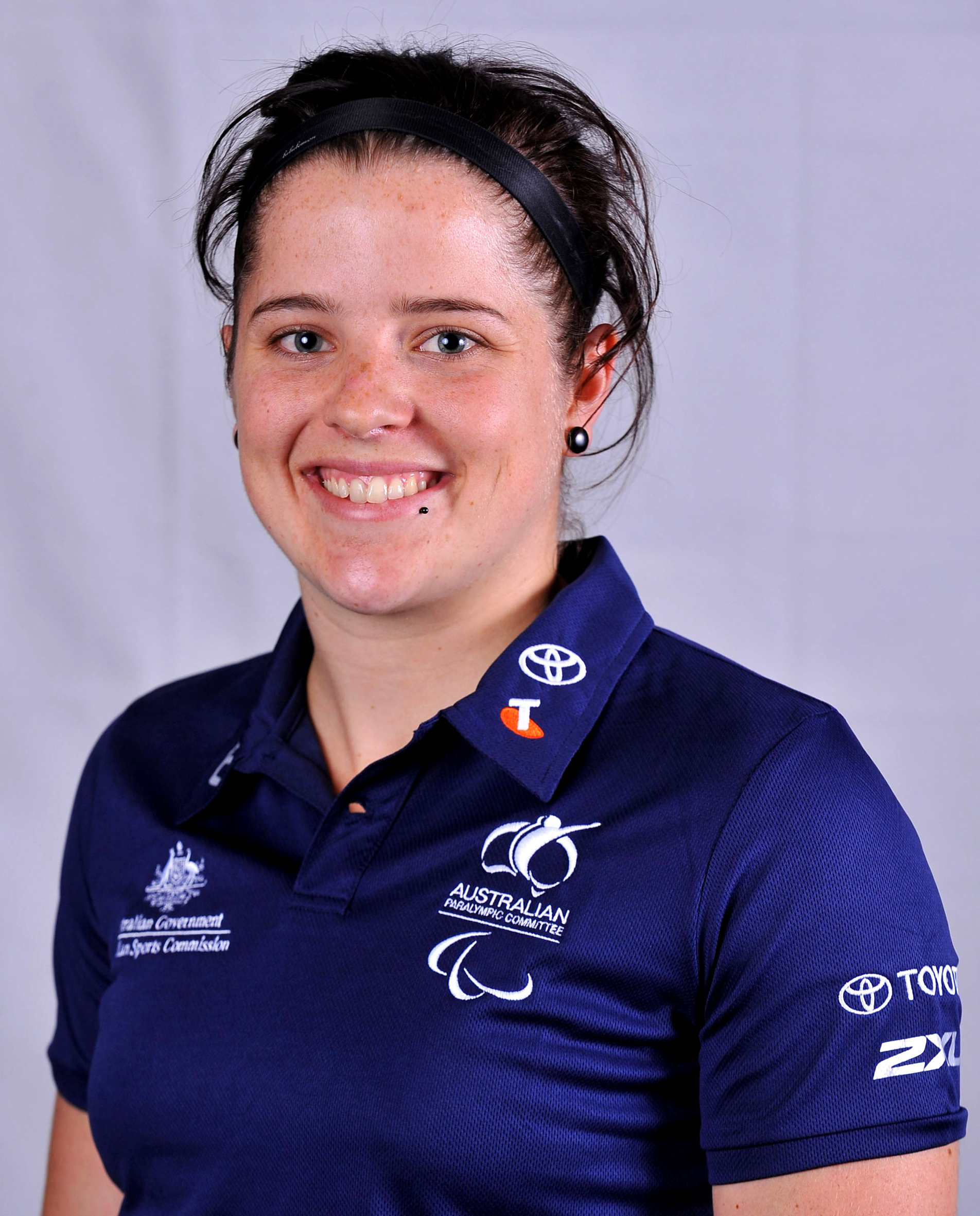
Cobi Crispin
Ashburton, Victoria
125 international games

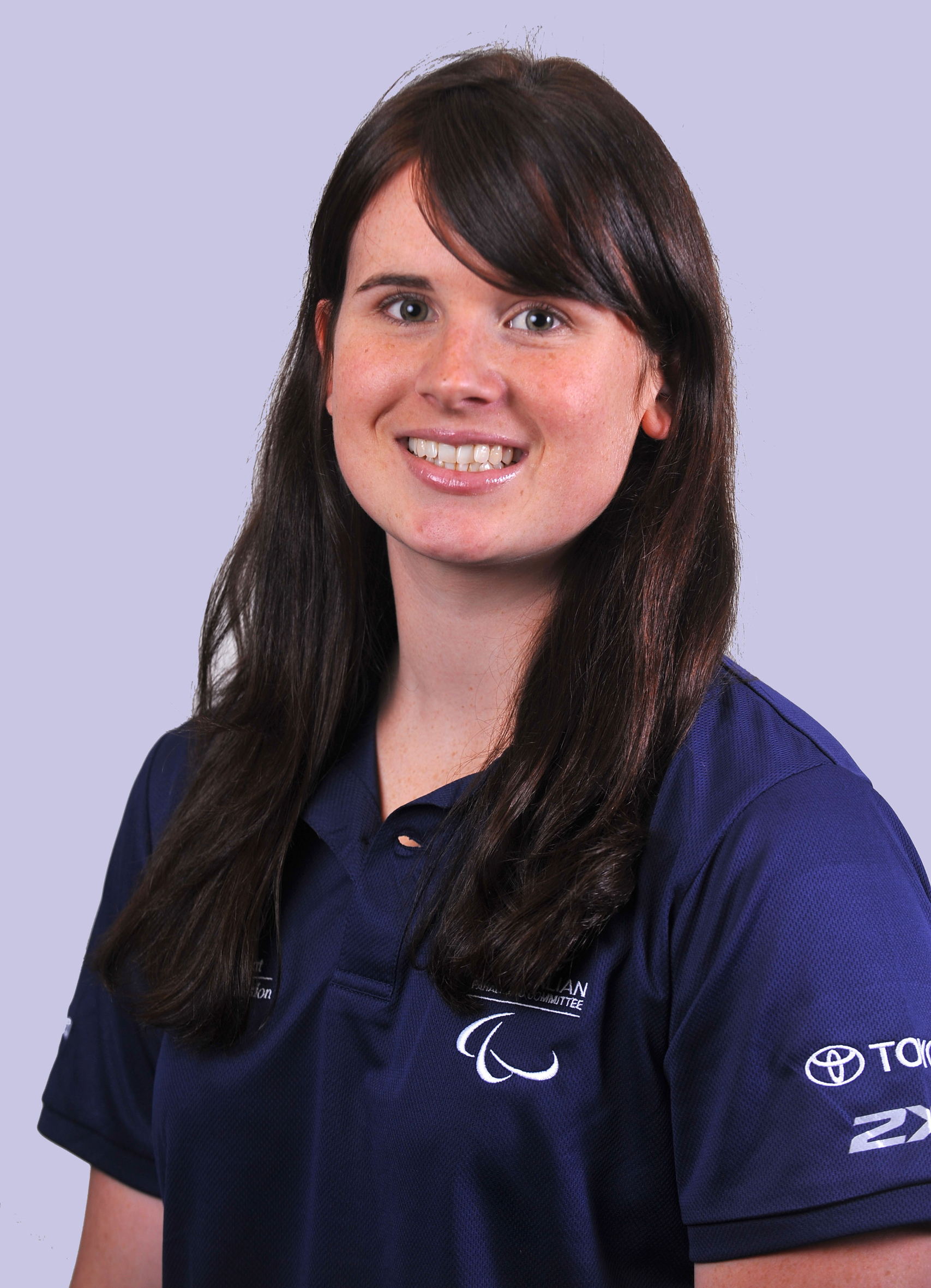
Bridie Kean
Alexandra Headland, Queensland
98 international games

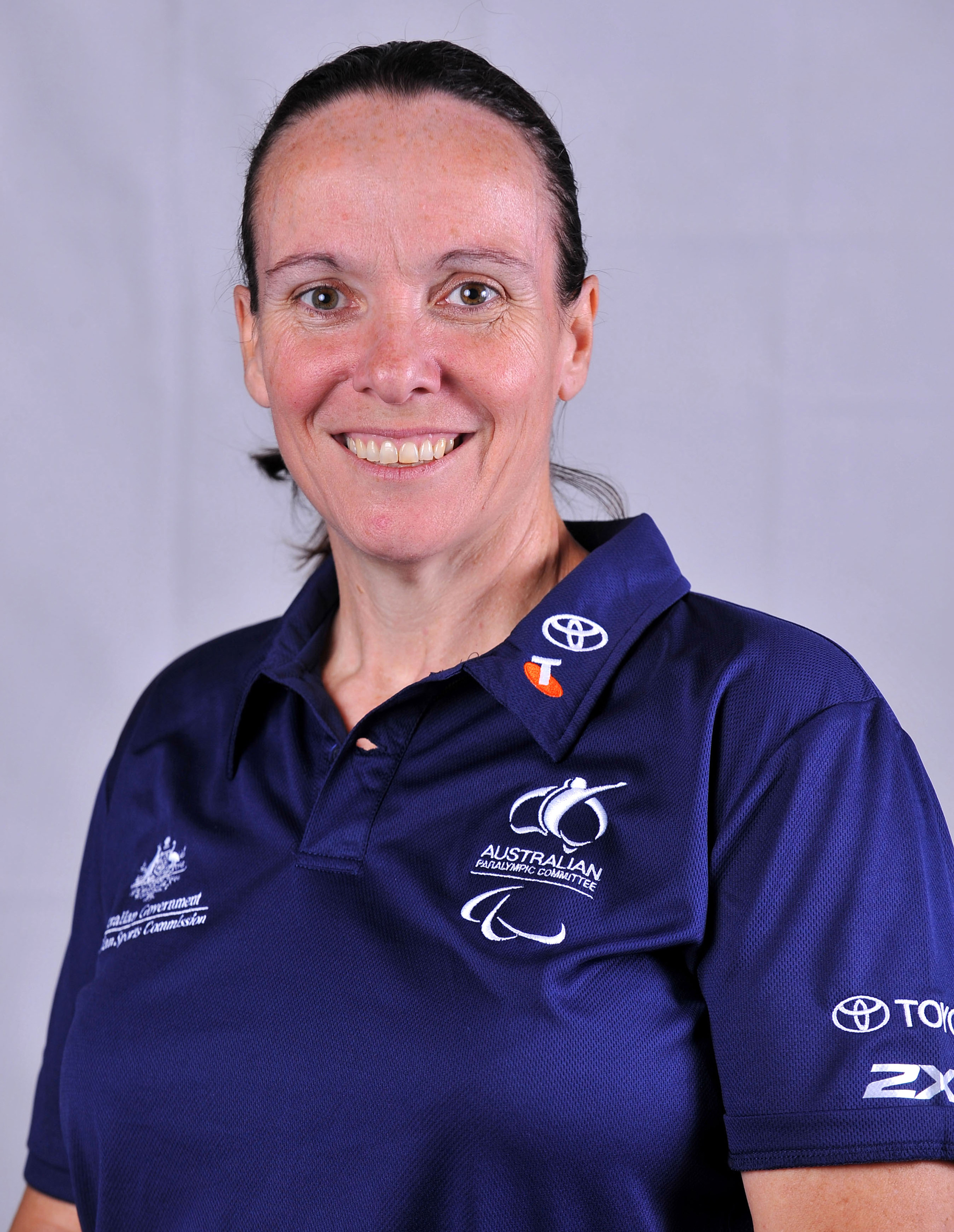
Amanda Carter
Heidelberg West, Victoria
126 international games

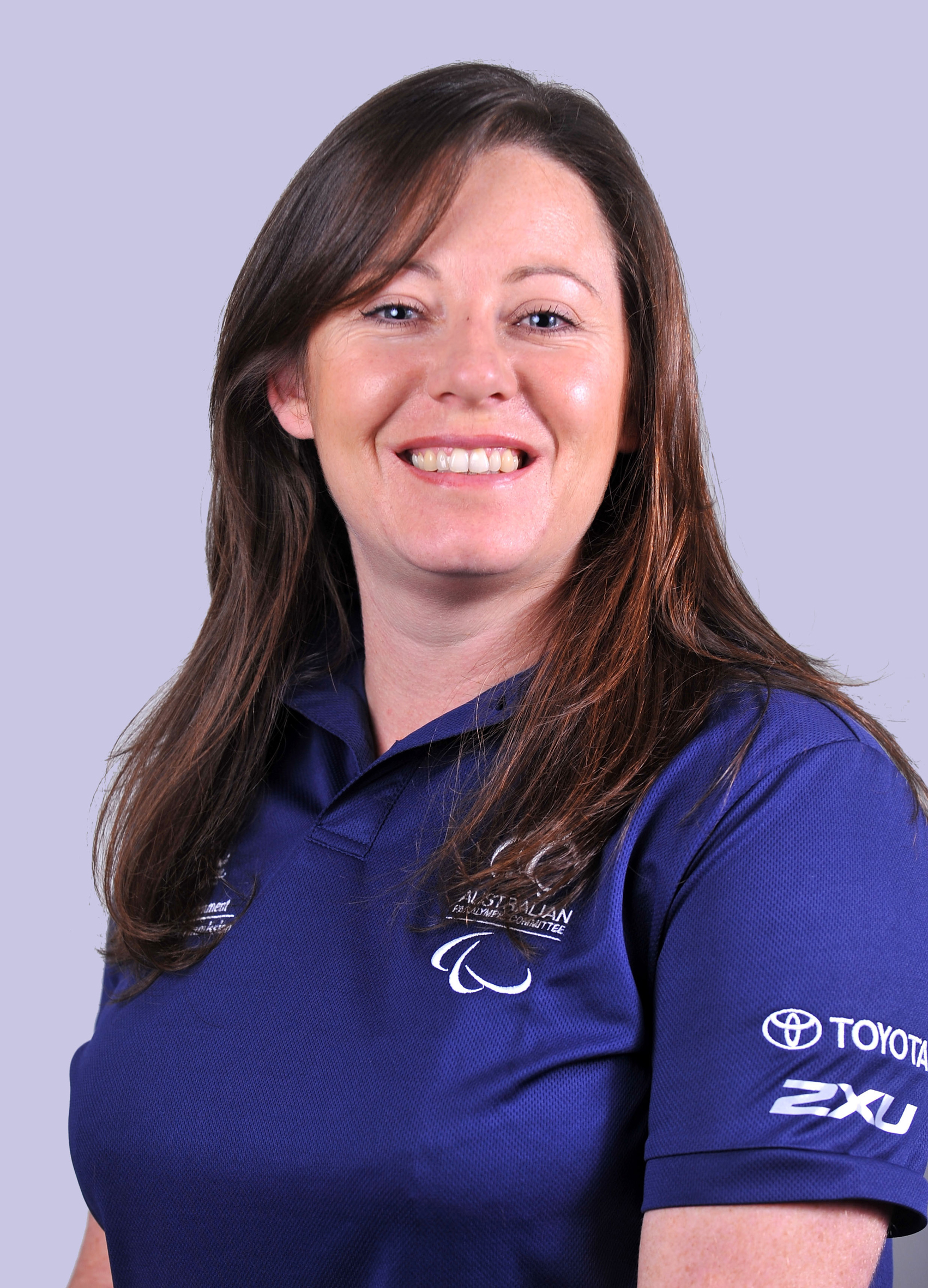
Tina McKenzie
St Peters, New South Wales
168 international games

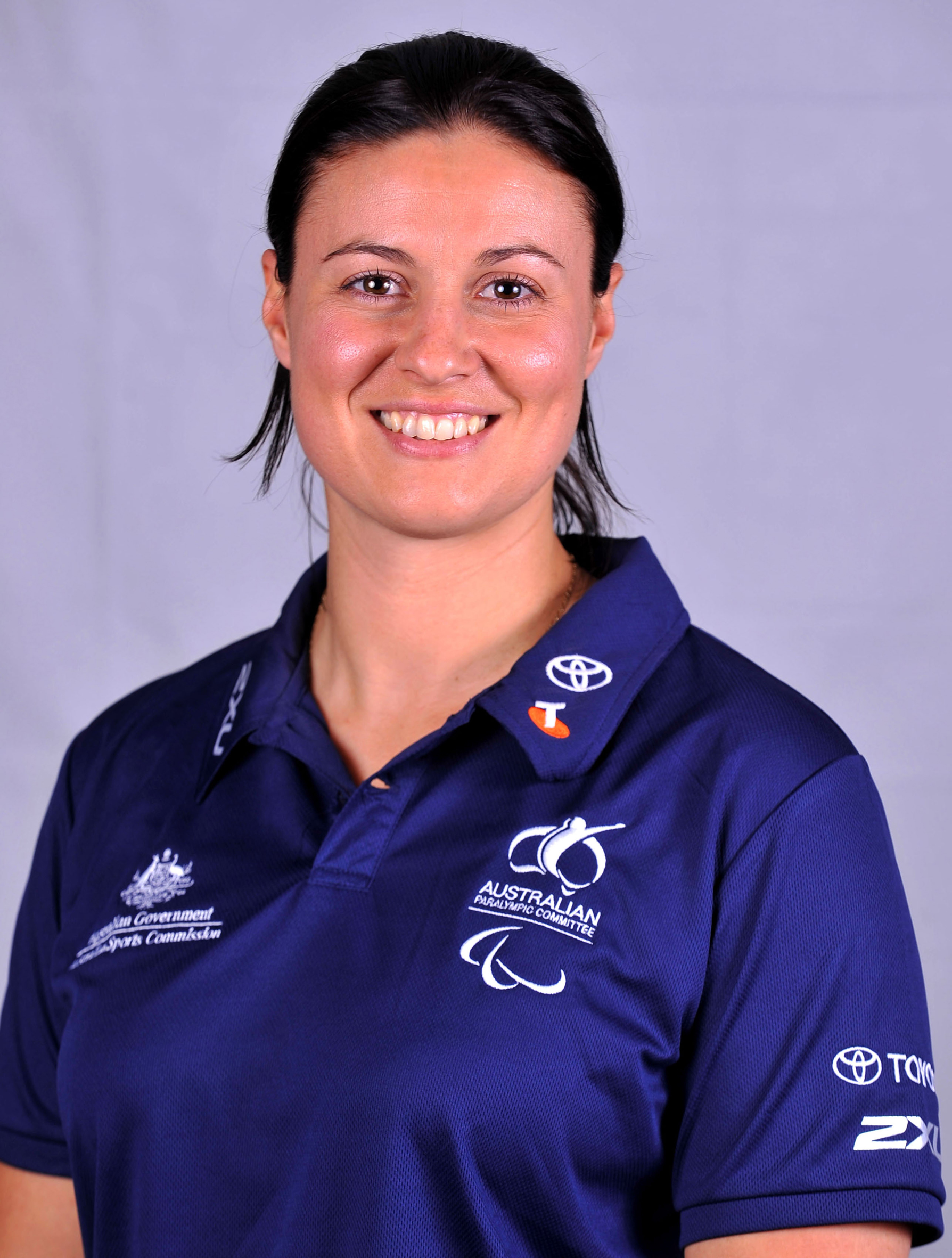
Leanne Del Toso
Watsonia, Victoria
62 international games

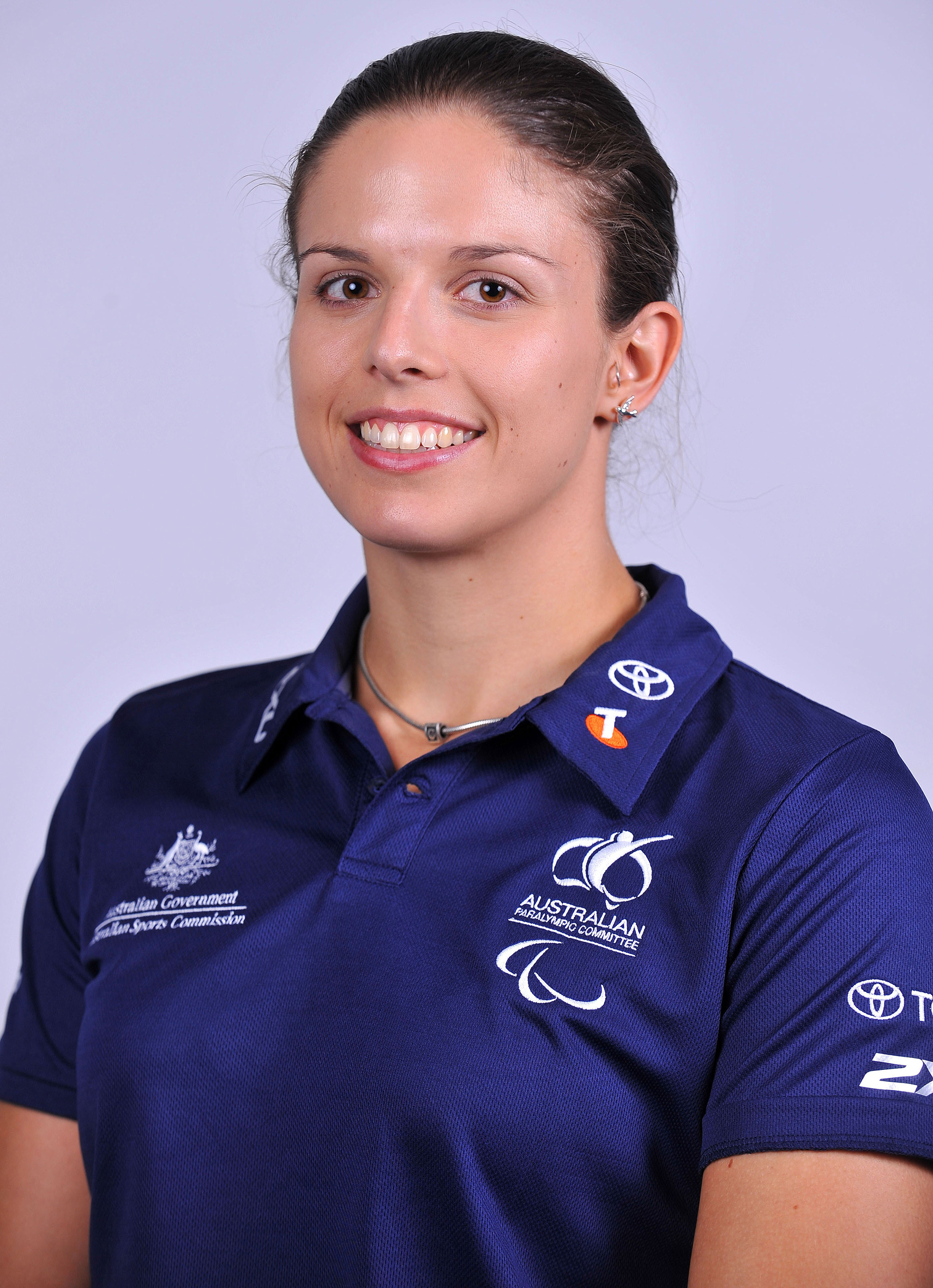
Clare Nott
Landsdale, Western Australia
134 international games

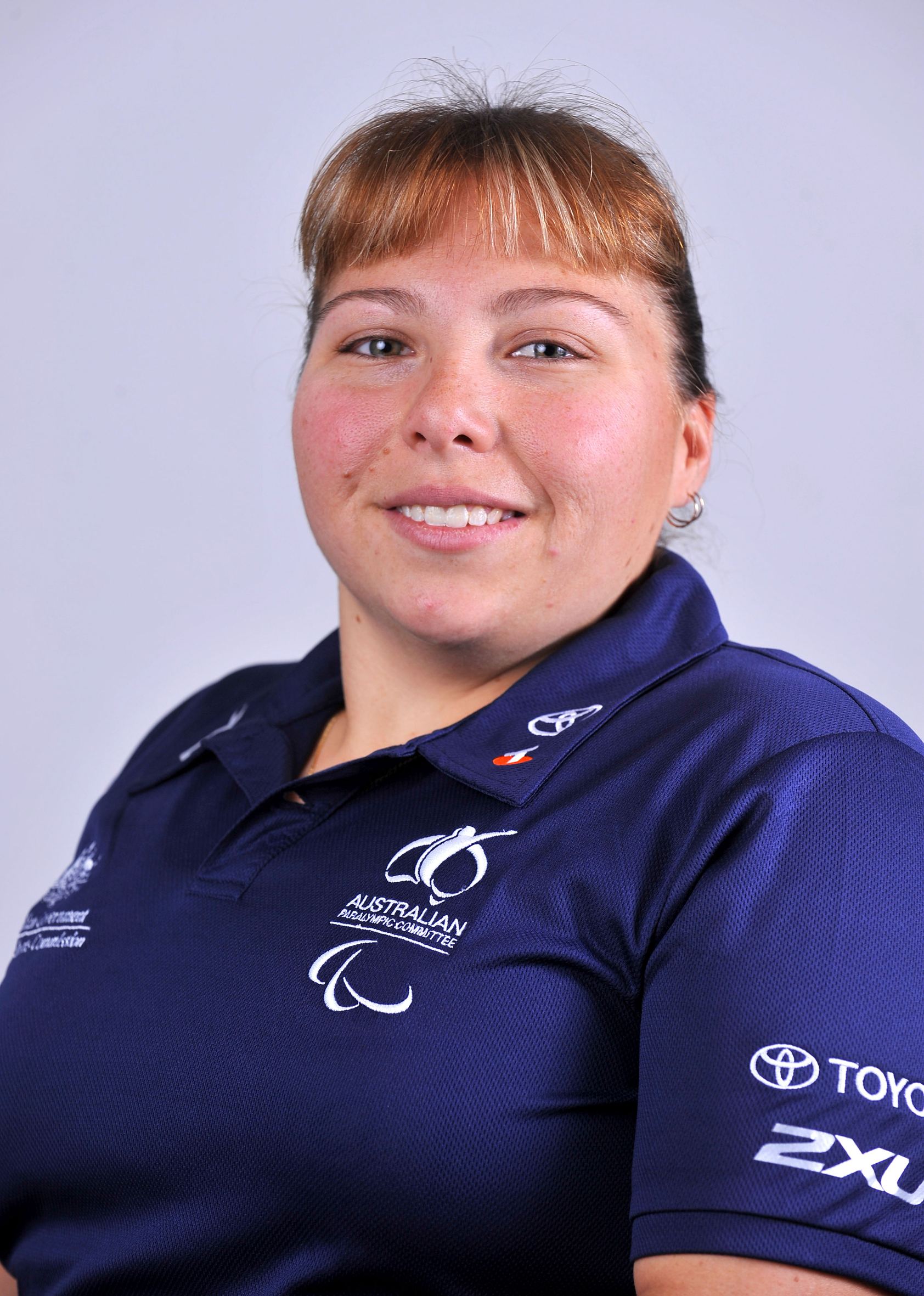
Kylie Gauci
Rooty Hill, New South Wales
177 international games

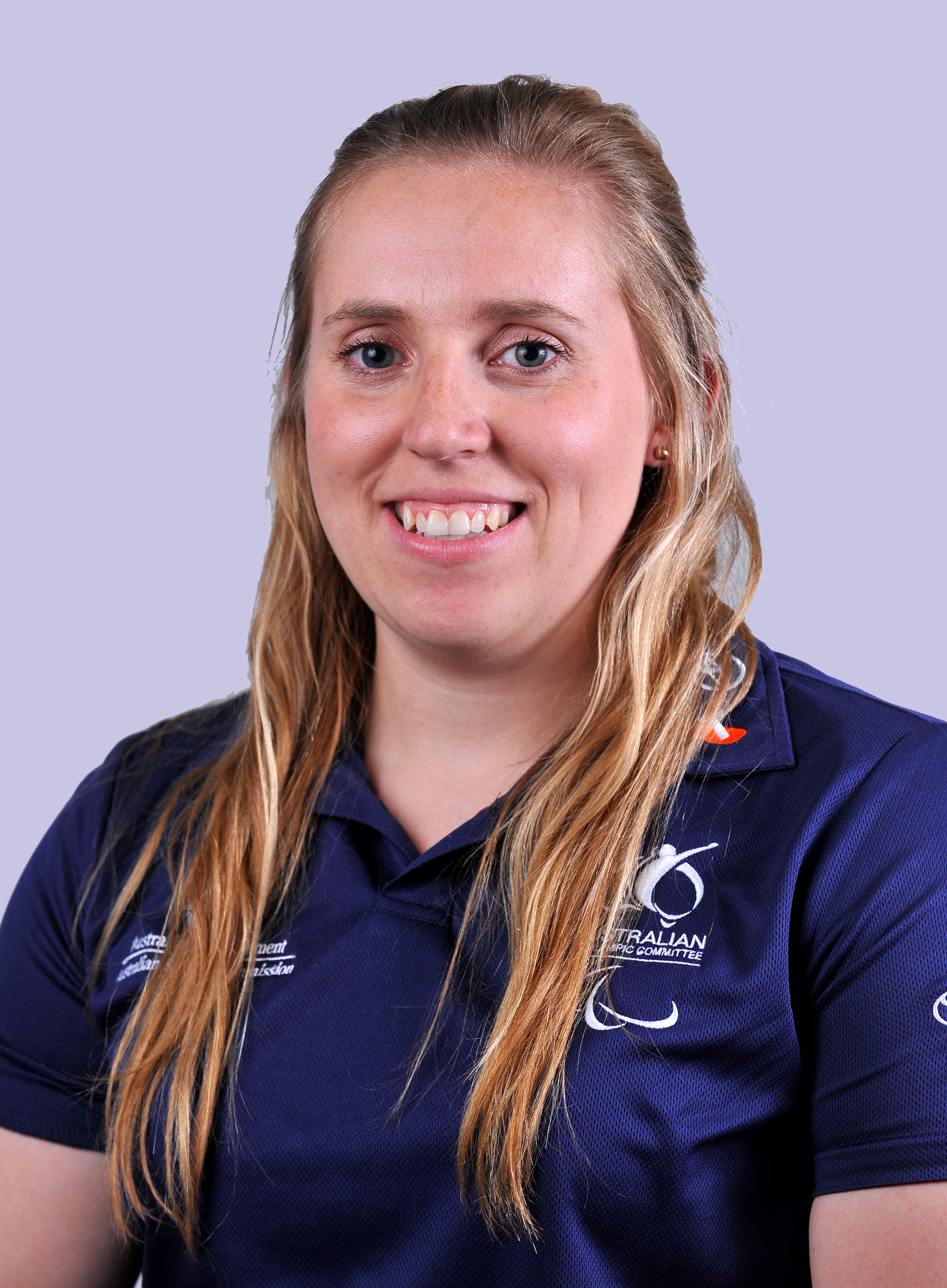
Shelley Chaplin
Ashburton, Victoria
166 international games

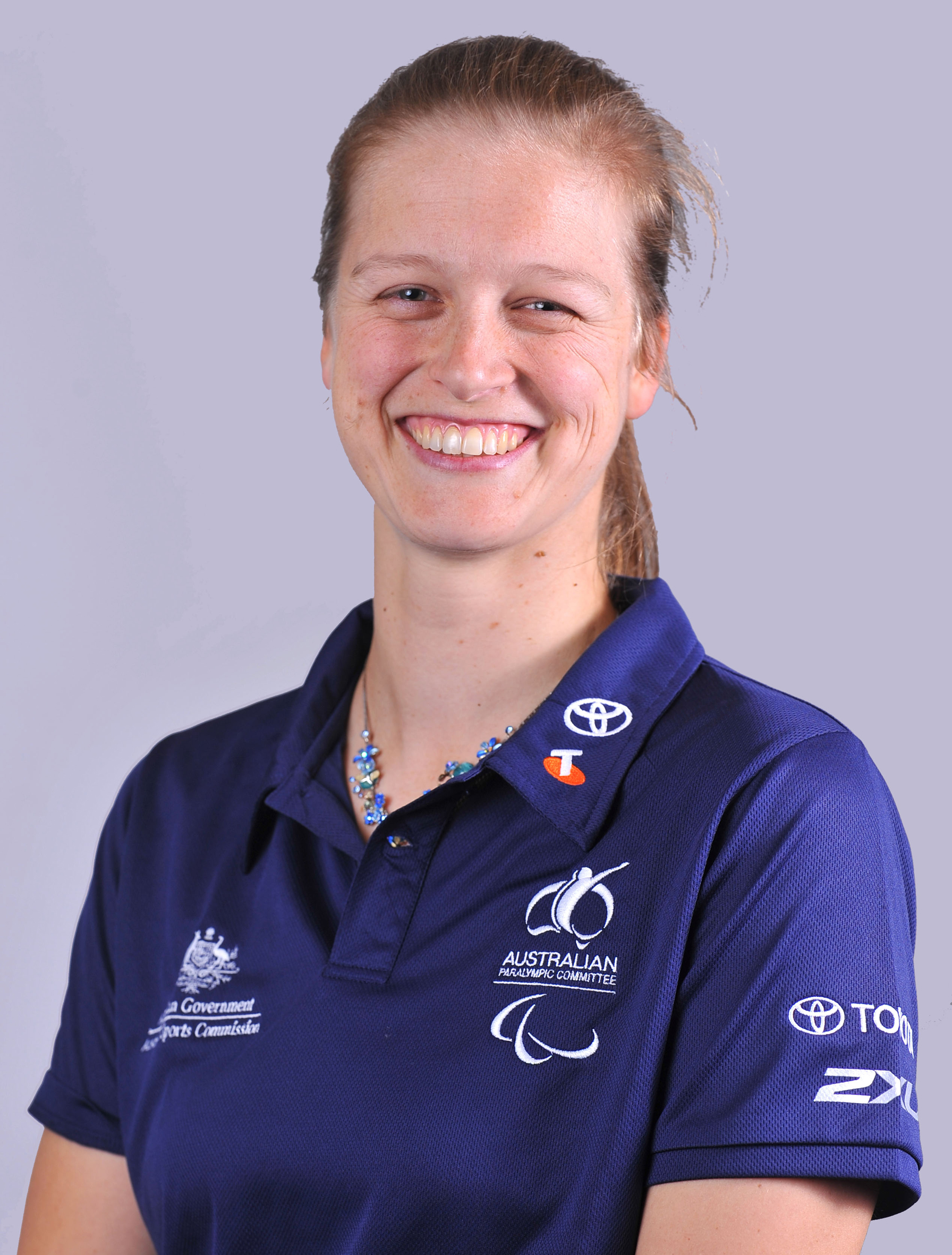
Sarah Stewart
Maroubra, New South Wales
165 international games

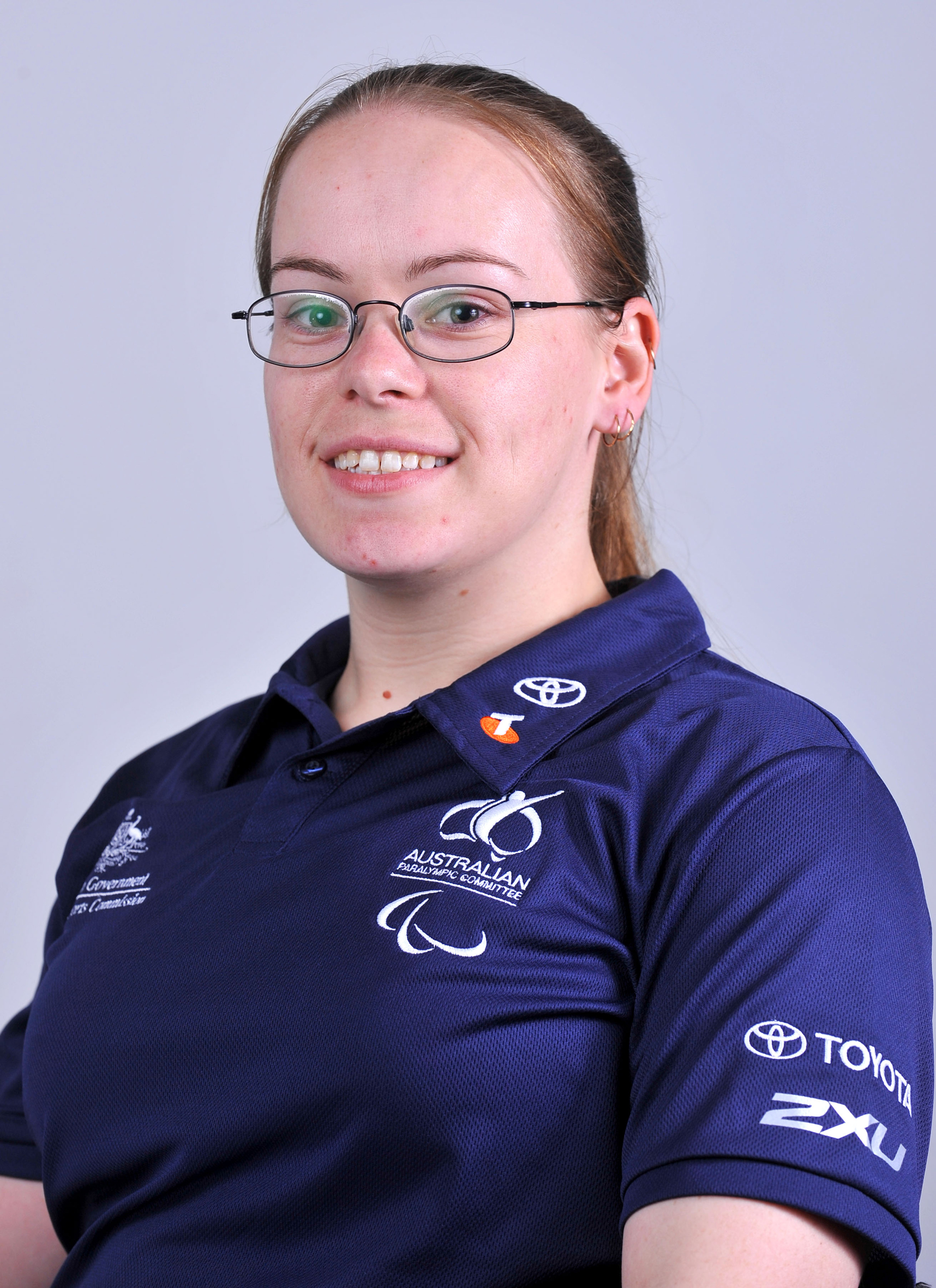
Katie Hill
Panania, New South Wales
110 international games

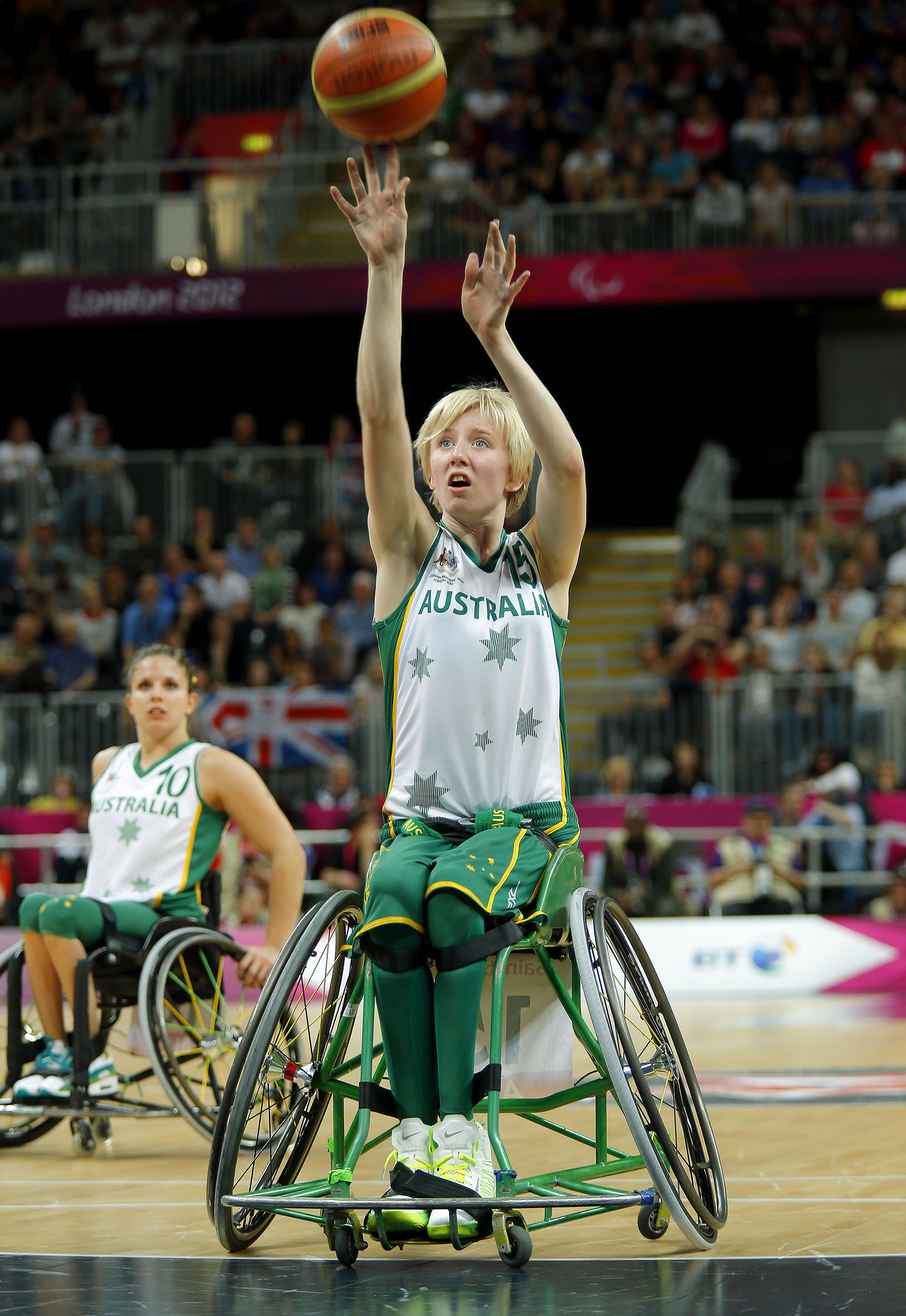
Amber Merritt
Wanneroo, Western Australia
70 international games

Source: Basketball Australia; International Games as at 29 August 2012 from Official Results Book, p. 4152.

== Group stage ==
The first part of the competition was the group stage. The Gliders' pool included Brazil, Great Britain, Canada and the Netherlands. Canada had defeated them in the bronze medal game at the 2010 Wheelchair Basketball World Championship in Birmingham in July 2010. The Gliders' head coach, John Triscari, admitted Canada and the Netherlands would be hard to beat:

Canada beat us at the World Championships in the bronze medal game and although we’ve since gotten back on top of them, they will be a tough side to beat, as will the Netherlands, who historically have beaten us by just a few points on a few occasions. We've worked really hard to improve the team's shooting percentage, we've had strength and conditioning coaches working with the girls to up their fitness and we’ve increased the volume of shooting during training. Hopefully all the hard work the girls are putting in now, will pay off in London.

Team	Pld	W	L	PF	PA	PD	Pts	Qualification
Australia	4	3	1	211	180	+31	7 (Note: head-to-head score differential: AUS: +2; NED: +2; CAN: −4) (Note: Netherlands and Australia have the same score difference but Australia won the match from the Netherlands (58–49))	Quarter-finals
Netherlands	4	3	1	236	194	+42	7	Quarter-finals
Canada	4	3	1	248	231	+17	7	Quarter-finals
Great Britain	4	1	3	151	217	−66	5	Quarter-finals
Brazil	4	0	4	190	214	−24	4	Eliminated

Rules for classification: 1) Table points, 2) Head-to-head score differential

=== Brazil ===
30 August 2012
18:30

Report

Australia	52–50	Brazil
Scoring by quarter: 14–12, 11–13, 14–12, 13–13
Pts: Crispin 18; Rebs: Merritt 10; Asts: three players 3		Pts: Soares Martins 27; Rebs: Soares Martins 14; Asts: Guimarrães da Costa 12

Basketball Arena, London
Referees: Linas Radykas (LTU)

Report:

Key: Pts = points, Rebs = rebounds, Asts = assists

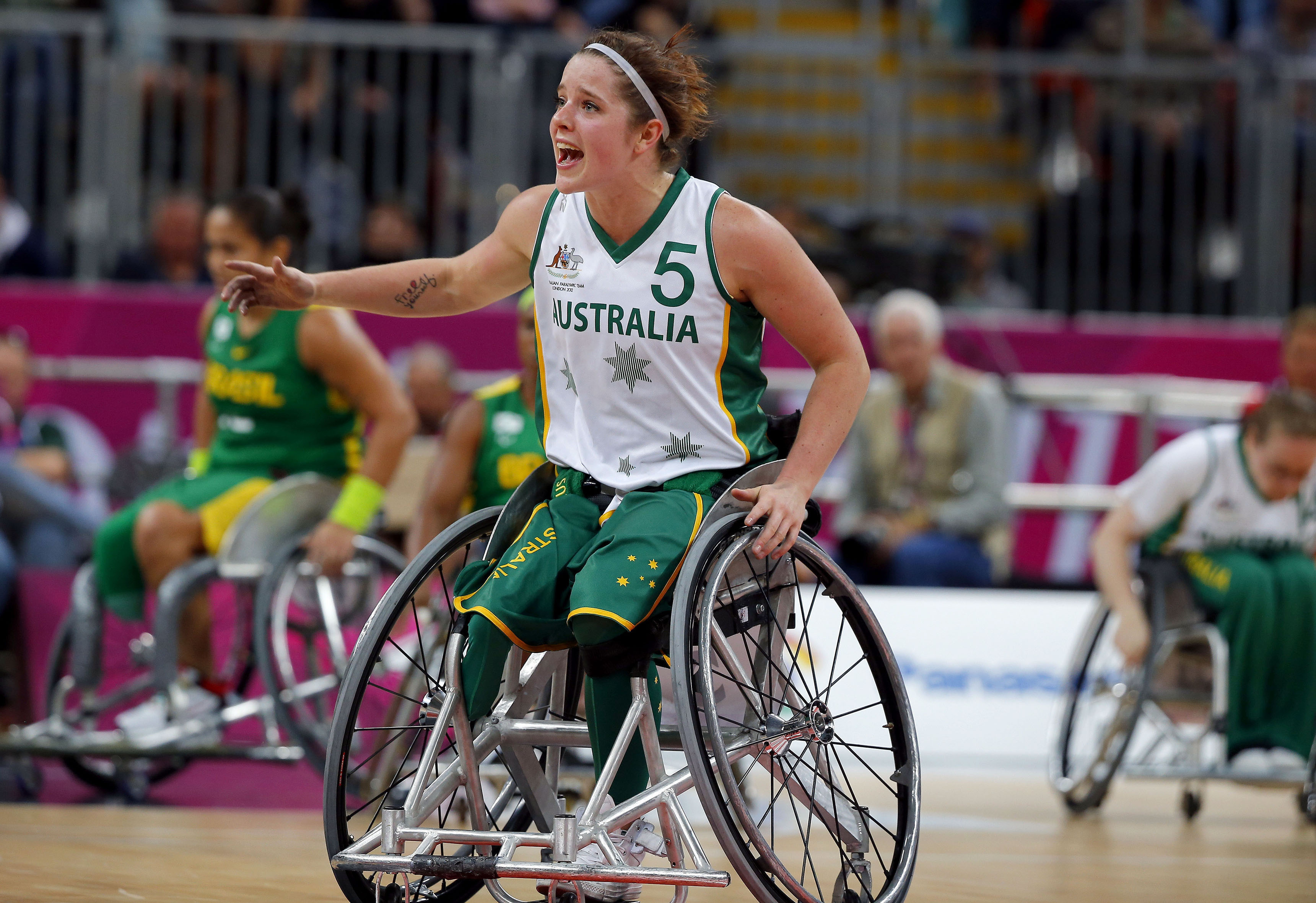
Cobi Crispin in the match against Brazil

The Gliders' first game was on 30 August in front of a crowd of 3,288 at the Basketball Arena in Olympic Park in Stratford, London; a venue also known as "The Marshmallow". The Gliders had not played Brazil in four years, and what little they knew about them came from watching videotapes.

The scores were tied fifteen times, and at no point were the Australians more than five points in front. With six minutes to go in the final quarter, the Gliders were up by only two points, with the score 45–43. Crispin was sent to the free-throw line where she extended her team's lead to 47–43. A technical foul saw her straight back to the free-throw line to make it 48–43, the Gliders' biggest lead of the game. Brazil then struck back, scoring five unanswered points to tie the score again at 48–48, but Merritt scored one from the paint to put the Gliders back in front. She followed by taking a defensive rebound and then another shot to make it 52–48. Brazil scored once more, but time ran out, and the Gliders won, 52–50. Leading scorers for the Gliders were Crispin with 18 points and Merritt with 16.

Women's wheelchair basketball – Group A preliminary – Australia vs Brazil – Statistics

Women's wheelchair basketball – Group A preliminary – Australia vs Brazil
No.	Name	Class	Minutes	Points	2 points		3 points		Free throws		Rebounds			Assists	Turnovers	Steals	Blocked shots	Personal fouls	Fouls drawn
					Made/Attempts	%	Made/Attempts	%	Made/Attempts	%	Offensive	Defensive	Total						
4	Sarah Vinci	1.0	15:12	0	0/0	0	0/0	0	0/0	0	0	1	1	0	0	0	0	0	0
5	Cobi Crispin	4.0	32:34	18	7/14	50	0/0	0	4/7	57	2	5	7	3	3	2	0	2	4
6	Bridie Kean (C)	4.0	14:53	2	1/2	50	0/0	0	0/0	0	0	5	5	0	1	0	0	1	0
7	Amanda Carter	1.0	05:39	0	0/0	0	0/0	0	0/0	0	0	0	0	0	0	0	0	0	0
8	Tina McKenzie	3.0	0	0	0/0	0	0/0	0	0/0	0	0	0	0	0	0	0	0	0	0
9	Leanne Del Toso	3.5	01:46	0	0/0	0	0/0	0	0/0	0	0	1	1	0	0	0	0	0	0
10	Clare Nott	1.0	35:04	6	3/6	50	0/0	0	0/0	0	1	3	4	3	3	0	0	0	0
11	Kylie Gauci	2.0	24:05	4	2/7	29	0/1	0	0/0	0	0	3	3	2	3	0	0	0	2
12	Shelley Chaplin	3.5	20:42	0	0/4	0	0/0	0	0/0	0	0	1	1	1	3	0	0	3	2
13	Sarah Stewart	3.0	07:21	2	1/2	50	0/0	0	0/0	0	0	0	0	1	0	0	0	1	1
14	Katie Hill	3.0	19:23	4	2/6	33	0/0	0	0/0	0	0	2	2	3	0	0	0	0	1
15	Amber Merritt	4.5	23:21	16	8/11	73	0/0	0	0/0	0	3	7	10	0	3	0	0	1	2
	Team										2	3	5	0	3	0	0	0	0
	Team totals			52							8	31	39	13	19	2	0	8	12

Source: Women's Wheelchair Basketball – Group A Preliminary – Australia vs Brazil – Statistics

=== Great Britain ===
31 August 2012
13:00

Report

Great Britain	24–51	Australia
Scoring by quarter: 5–11, 6–14, 3–14, 10–12
Pts: Hamer 8 Rebs: Strange 7 Asts: three players 2		Pts: Merritt 10; Rebs: Crispin 7 Asts: Gauci 4

North Greenwich Arena, London
Referees: Nureddin Bilmez (TUR)

Report:

The Gliders' next match was against Great Britain, and was held at the North Greenwich Arena, which could accommodate a larger crowd than the Marshmallow. A crowd of 5,331 saw a low-scoring affair. The Gliders concentrated on defence, and led by only 11–5 at quarter time. By halftime, they had extended their lead to 25–11. The third quarter went badly for Team Great Britain, which only scored three more points to Australia's 14, making the score 39–14 at three-quarter time. The final quarter was Great Britain's best, but the score was still 51–24. Merritt and Crispin were again the Gliders' top scorers, with 10 and 8 points respectively, but they moved the ball around, and every Glider except McKenzie scored at least two points. Gary Peel, the British coach, "preparing to unleash his best impression of Sir Alex Ferguson's hairdryer on his beleaguered team", was scathing about their performance. "They know that's not the way we play", he said, "and I'm disappointed for the crowd and them because they are tons better than that. It was an absolutely disgraceful effort out there. It really was bad."

Women's wheelchair basketball – Group A preliminary – Australia vs Great Britain – Statistics

Women's wheelchair basketball – Group A preliminary – Australia vs Great Britain
No.	Name	Class	Minutes	Points	2 points		3 points		Free throws		Rebounds			Assists	Turnovers	Steals	Blocked shots	Personal fouls	Fouls drawn
					Made/Attempts	%	Made/Attempts	%	Made/Attempts	%	Offensive	Defensive	Total						
4	Sarah Vinci	1.0	25:30	4	2/4	50	0/0	0	0/0	0	2	0	2	1	2	0	0	3	0
5	Cobi Crispin	4.0	20:49	8	4/10	40	0/0	0	0/0	0	2	5	7	1	1	0	0	3	2
6	Bridie Kean (C)	4.0	20:42	4	2/4	50	0/0	0	0/2	0	1	5	6	0	0	1	0	0	2
7	Amanda Carter	1.0	13:28	2	1/2	50	0/0	0	0/0	0	0	0	0	0	1	0	0	1	0
8	Tina McKenzie	3.0	7:02	0	0/0	0	0/0	0	0/0	0	0	1	1	2	0	0	0	0	0
9	Leanne Del Toso	3.5	10:00	2	1/4	25	0/0	0	0/0	0	2	4	6	1	2	0	0	1	1
10	Clare Nott	1.0	23:25	6	3/6	50	0/0	0	0/0	0	0	2	2	0	1	2	0	0	0
11	Kylie Gauci	2.0	17:37	6	3/7	43	0/0	0	0/0	0	0	2	2	4	4	1	0	2	1
12	Shelley Chaplin	3.5	17:14	4	2/8	25	0/0	0	0/0	0	1	1	2	0	2	1	0	0	1
13	Sarah Stewart	3.0	9:45	3	1/5	20	0/0	0	1/4	25	3	1	4	3	0	0	0	2	2
14	Katie Hill	3.0	9:02	2	1/1	100	0/0	0	0/0	0	1	0	1	0	1	0	0	2	0
15	Amber Merritt	4.5	25:26	10	5/11	45	0/0	0	0/0	0	2	4	6	2	1	3	0	3	0
	Team										1	7	8	0	2	0	0	0	0
	Team totals			51							15	32	47	14	17	8	0	17	9

Source: Women's Wheelchair Basketball – Group A Preliminary – Australia vs Great Britain – Statistics

=== Canada ===
1 September 2012
18:30

Report

Australia	50–57	Canada
Scoring by quarter: 12–20, 20–13, 8–10, 10–14
Pts: Merritt 16; Rebs: Crispin 15; Asts: Chaplin 7		Pts: McLachlan 28; Rebs: McLachlan 21; Asts: Ouellet 9

Basketball Arena, London
Referees: Karen Molina (COL)

Report:

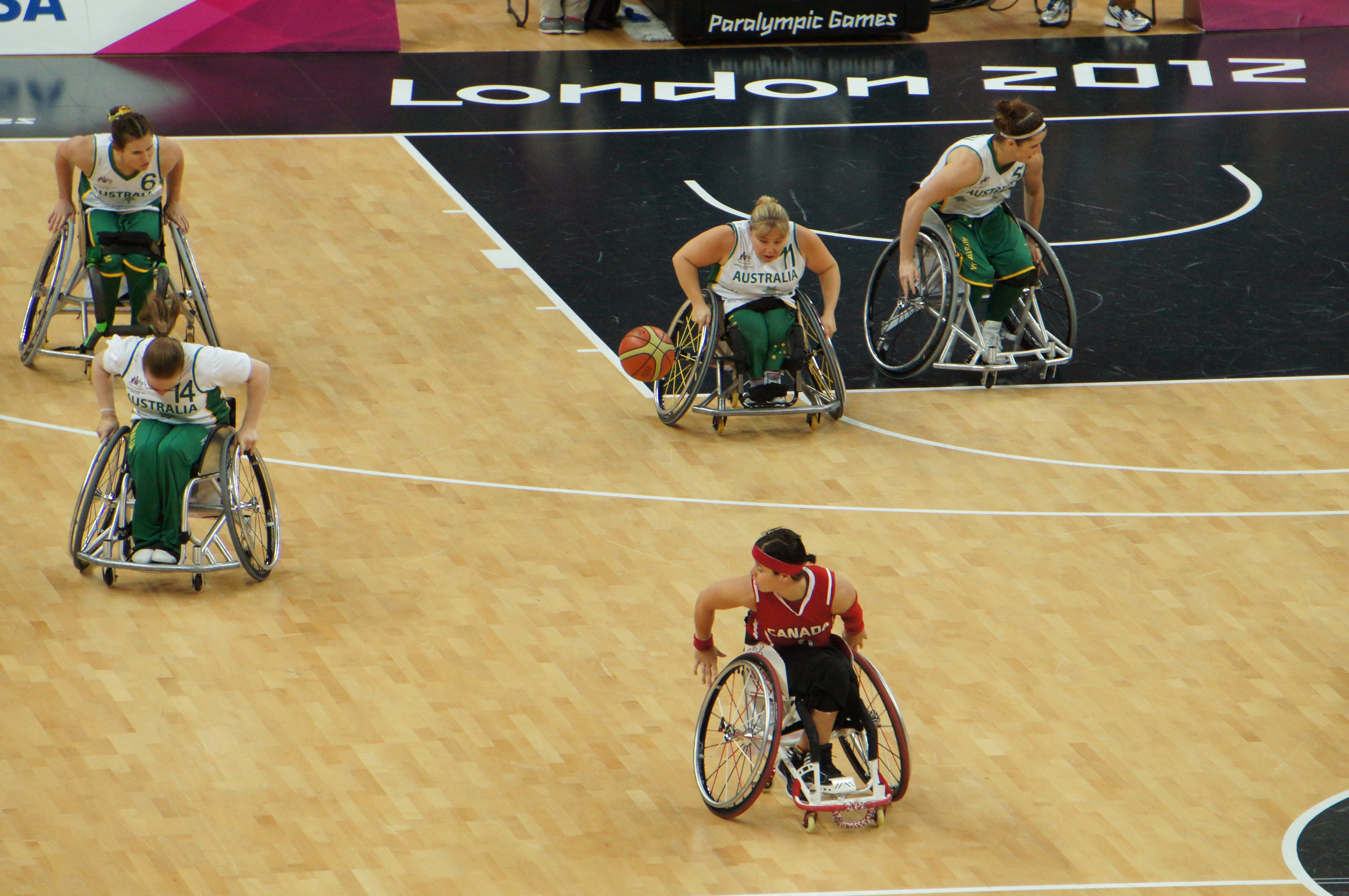
Match with Canada. Left to right: Bridie Kean, Katie Hill, Kylie Gauci and Cobi Crispin, with Canada's Cindy Ouellet

The Gliders returned to the Marshmallow the next day for a match against Canada, another team considered a strong chance for a medal, in front of a capacity crowd of 7,200. The Gliders squandered early opportunities, and Canada won the first quarter 20–12. Strong defensive play by Nott and Gauci helped the Gliders reverse this in the second, and left Canada with only a one-point 33–32 lead at half time. The second half saw Canada slowly increase their lead, keeping tied with Australia 4–4 in the first half of third, 6–4 in the last half of the third, 6–4 in the first half of the fourth, and 8–6 in the last half of the fourth. Australia's top players were Crispin, who had 13 points and 15 rebounds; Merritt, who earned 16 points; and Chaplin, with eight points, five rebounds and seven assists. The loss raised the prospect that Australia might not make the finals at all, but Crispin remained confident that they could.

Triscari identified the Gliders' poor shooting as their critical problem. "That was a really tough game," he said, "and full credit to Canada, but we can't beat top teams in the world when we only shoot at 34%, that was the key statistic." Merritt said that she had "the utmost respect for Canada. They're a great team, but we'll refocus on the game tomorrow and go out and play like we know we can, the Australian way."

Women's wheelchair basketball – Group A preliminary – Australia vs Canada – Statistics

Women's wheelchair basketball – Group A preliminary – Australia vs Canada
No.	Name	Class	Minutes	Points	2 points		3 points		Free throws		Rebounds			Assists	Turnovers	Steals	Blocked shots	Personal fouls	Fouls drawn
					Made/Attempts	%	Made/Attempts	%	Made/Attempts	%	Offensive	Defensive	Total						
4	Sarah Vinci	1.0	19:53	0	0/0	0	0/0	0	0/0	0	0	1	1	0	0	1	0	0	0
5	Cobi Crispin	4.0	29:43	12	5/13	38	0/0	0	2/3	67	4	11	15	3	3	0	0	5	3
6	Bridie Kean (C)	4.0	13:37	0	0/8	0	0/0	0	0/0	0	1	3	4	0	1	1	0	3	1
7	Amanda Carter	1.0	0	0	0/0	0	0/0	0	0/0	0	0	0	0	0	0	0	0	0	0
8	Tina McKenzie	3.0	0	0	0/0	0	0/0	0	0/0	0	0	0	0	0	0	0	0	0	0
9	Leanne Del Toso	3.5	0	0	0/0	0	0/0	0	0/0	0	0	0	0	0	0	0	0	0	0
10	Clare Nott	1.0	40:00	4	2/5	40	0/0	0	0/0	0	1	3	4	3	1	0	1	2	0
11	Kylie Gauci	2.0	20:07	6	3/9	33	0/0	0	0/0	0	1	1	2	1	0	0	0	0	1
12	Shelley Chaplin	3.5	31:08	8	4/14	29	0/0	0	0/0	0	1	4	5	7	1	0	0	2	0
13	Sarah Stewart	3.0	7:09	2	1/3	33	0/0	0	0/0	0	0	0	0	1	0	0	0	0	0
14	Katie Hill	3.0	12:58	2	1/3	33	0/0	0	0/0	0	0	2	2	0	1	0	0	0	0
15	Amber Merritt	4.5	25:25	16	7/13	54	0/1	0	2/5	40	3	3	6	2	1	0	0	4	5
	Team										1	0	1	0	2	0	0	0	0
	Team totals			50							12	28	40	17	8	2	1	16	10

Source: Women's Wheelchair Basketball – Group A Preliminary – Australia vs Canada – Statistics

=== Netherlands ===
2 September 2012
21:15

Report

Netherlands	49–58	Australia
Scoring by quarter: 12–18, 8–12, 9–10, 20–18
Pts: Huitzing 14; Rebs: Huitzing 8 Asts: Huitzing 7		Pts: Merritt 19; Rebs: Crispin 7 Asts: Chaplin 7

North Greenwich Arena, London
Referees: Darrell Hargreaves (USA)

Report:

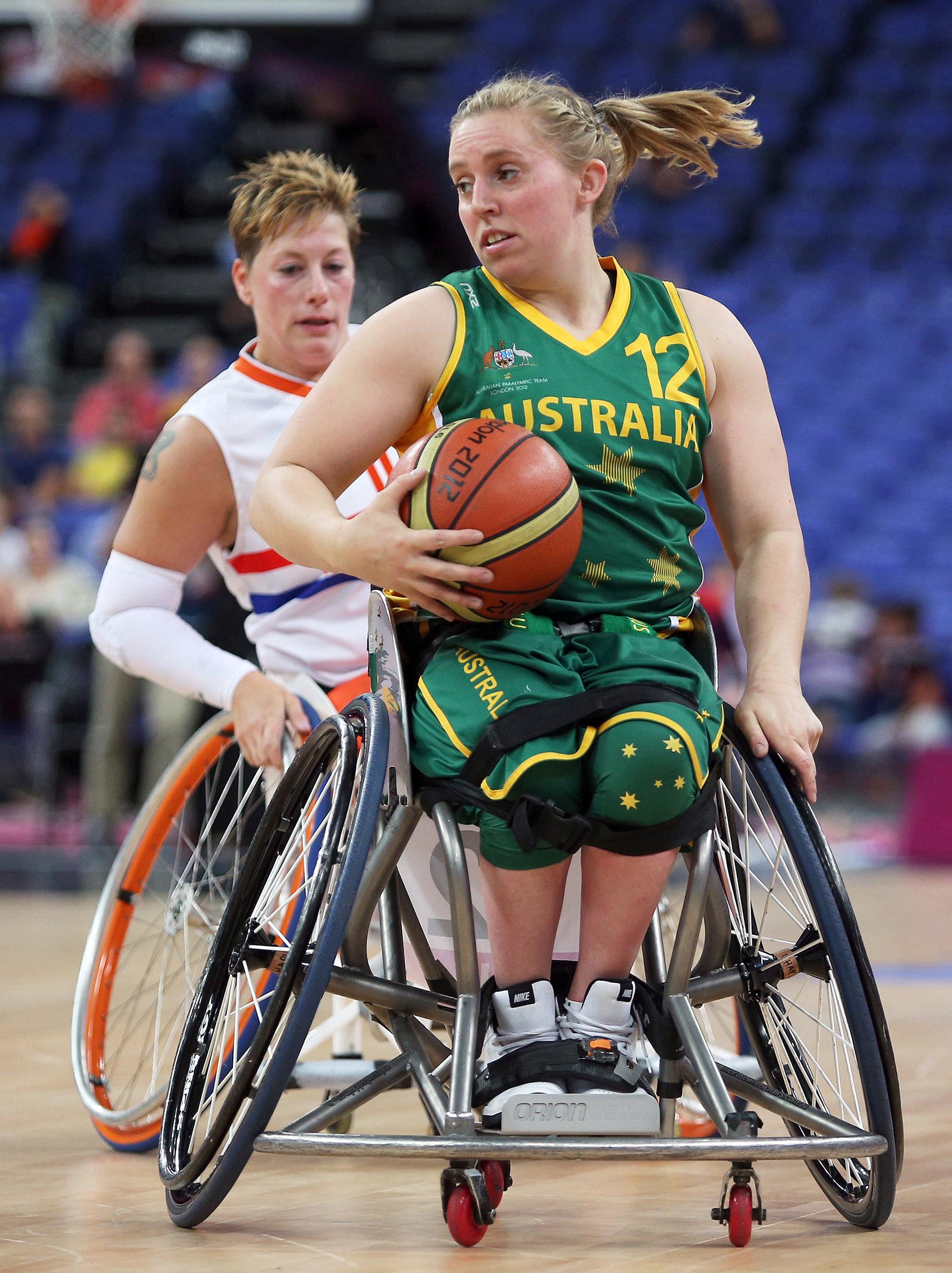
Shelley Chaplin in the match against the Netherlands with Cher Korver behind her

The loss to Canada meant that the Gliders needed a win against the Netherlands, who were considered one of the competition's best teams, and who had beaten Canada. Crispin told the media that "We will go out like we have in every other game and stick to our game plan and hopefully we'll come out on top".

The Netherlands scored first, but Kean soon equalised, assisted by Stewart. The Dutch team responded, but Gauci took two points with a fast break, and then assisted Crispin in putting Australia in the lead, one which the Gliders would not relinquish. Stewart made the next two scores, from outside the paint, and assisted Crispin to bring the score to 6–16. The Dutch team fought back, but there was a 12–18 deficit at quarter time. The Australian defence shut down their opportunities in the second quarter, and the score was 20–30 in Australia's favour at half time, and 29–40 by the end of the third quarter. The Dutch team redoubled their efforts in the final quarter, and won the quarter 20–18, but the Gliders won the game, 49–58.

Once again Merritt led Australia's scoring, with 19 points and considerably improved accuracy of 9 shots from 14 attempts, while Crispin had ten points and seven rebounds. The rest of the team performed equally well. Stewart scored six points and five rebounds. Chaplin's reputation as a play-maker was burnished with four rebounds and seven assists. Gauci had eight points and six assists. Nott had played all 40 minutes of the game against Canada the night before, then over 32 minutes in this game, and was particularly active in the final quarter. Triscari praised both the Gliders and their opponents:

We focused on stopping a lot of their big players, particularly Beijer, from getting into the keyway, and the girls did a sensational job. Gert [Gertjan van der Linden] is very hard to coach against because he throws a lot of stuff at you. Tonight, he was the one having to make the changes. Another day, it will probably be me.

Women's wheelchair basketball – Group A preliminary – Netherlands vs Australia – Statistics

Women's wheelchair basketball – Group A preliminary – Netherlands vs Australia
No.	Name	Class	Minutes	Points	2 points		3 points		Free throws		Rebounds			Assists	Turnovers	Steals	Blocked shots	Personal fouls	Fouls drawn
					Made/Attempts	%	Made/Attempts	%	Made/Attempts	%	Offensive	Defensive	Total						
4	Sarah Vinci	1.0	15:45	2	1/1	100	0/0	0	0/0	0	0	1	1	0	0	0	0	1	0
5	Cobi Crispin	4.0	25:09	10	5/10	50	0/0	0	0/0	0	1	6	7	2	1	0	0	3	1
6	Bridie Kean (C)	4.0	13:22	2	1/4	25	0/0	0	0/0	0	1	4	5	1	0	0	0	0	0
7	Amanda Carter	1.0	0	0	0/0	0	0/0	0	0/0	0	0	0	0	0	0	0	0	0	0
8	Tina McKenzie	3.0	0	0	0/0	0	0/0	0	0/0	0	0	0	0	0	0	0	0	0	0
9	Leanne Del Toso	3.5	0	0	0/0	0	0/0	0	0/0	0	0	0	0	0	0	0	0	0	0
10	Clare Nott	1.0	32:49	7	3/4	75	0/0	0	1/5	20	0	1	1	1	0	0	1	2	3
11	Kylie Gauci	2.0	31:26	8	4/10	40	0/0	0	0/0	0	0	2	2	6	0	0	0	0	1
12	Shelley Chaplin	3.5	26:38	0	0/3	0	0/0	0	0/2	0	2	2	4	7	2	0	0	2	3
13	Sarah Stewart	3.0	19:47	6	3/6	50	0/0	0	0/1	0	0	5	5	2	1	1	0	2	1
14	Katie Hill	3.0	11:39	4	2/3	67	0/0	0	0/0	0	0	1	1	2	0	0	0	0	0
15	Amber Merritt	4.5	23:25	19	9/14	64	0/0	0	1/2	50	0	5	5	0	1	0	1	3	2
	Team										0	1	1	0	1	0	0	0	0
	Team totals			58							4	28	32	21	6	1	2	13	11

Source: Women's Wheelchair Basketball – Group A Preliminary – Netherlands vs Australia – Statistics

== Finals ==
Quarterfinals
Australia	62
Mexico	37
United States	67
Canada	55
Netherlands	59
China	37
Germany	55
Great Britain	44

Semifinals
Australia	40
United States	39
Netherlands	46
Germany	49

Gold medal
Australia	44
Germany	58
Bronze medal
United States	47
Netherlands	71

=== Quarterfinal – Mexico ===
4 September 2012
13:00

Report

Australia	62–37	Mexico
Scoring by quarter: 21–10, 23–10, 6–9, 12–8
Pts: Merritt 14; Rebs: Kean 5 Asts: Gauci 7		Pts: Estrada Bernal 11; Rebs: Estrada Bernal 4 Asts: Estrada Bernal 16

North Greenwich Arena, London
Referees: Valerie Farrugia (FRA)

Report:

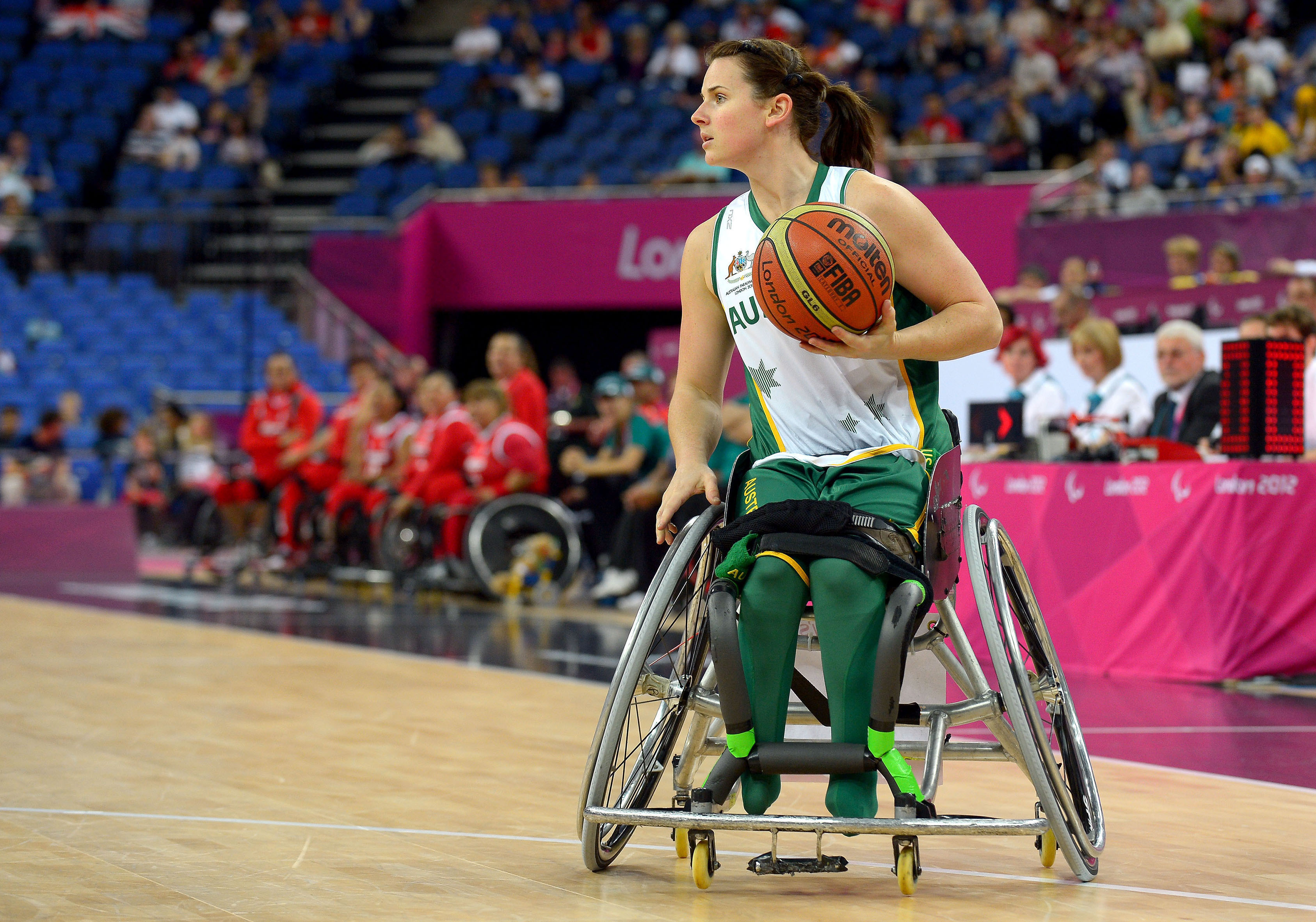
Bridie Kean in the match against Mexico

The loss to Canada meant that the Gliders had won three out of four games, the same number as Canada and the Netherlands. Since Australia had lost to Canada by 7 points and defeated the Netherlands by 9, and the Netherlands had defeated Canada by 11 points, a tiebreaker on points differential gave Australia 9 – 7 = +2, Netherlands 11 – 9 = +2, and Canada 7 – 11 = -4. Canada therefore finished third, while Australia, tied with the Netherlands, was placed ahead of them based on defeating them in their match. As a result, the Gliders topped their pool, and received a quarterfinal berth against Mexico, which had managed to qualify despite only winning one game. Triscari was confident, but was not taking the match lightly. He cautioned the media:

No game's easy, you know. We finished on top, so the crossover with the other side is in our favour. But they are by no means easy. We only beat Brazil by two points and Brazil only beat Mexico by two in the PanAm (Parapan championships) play-offs for third and fourth, so it's going to be tough.

The Gliders planned to dominate Mexico early, playing as aggressively against them as they had played against the Netherlands. Australia's first shots at goal were taken by Kean from the free-throw line, but she missed both. Mexico's Lucia Vazquez Delgadillo then opened the scoring to give Mexico a two-point lead, which turned out to be their biggest of the game. Gauci then put points on the scoreboard for the Gliders. Mexico turned the ball over, and Crispin got her first from the paint, assisted by Gauci, which was repeated on the next play, with Stewart providing the assist this time. Mexico scored, but the Gliders responded with another shot from Crispin. On the next play, Gauci stole the ball and charged down the court, but failed to make the shot. Nott then took a defensive rebound, leading to Crispin scoring again. She was also fouled, but missed the resulting free throw. Shortly thereafter, Stewart drew another foul, and made both shots to bring the score to 14–4.

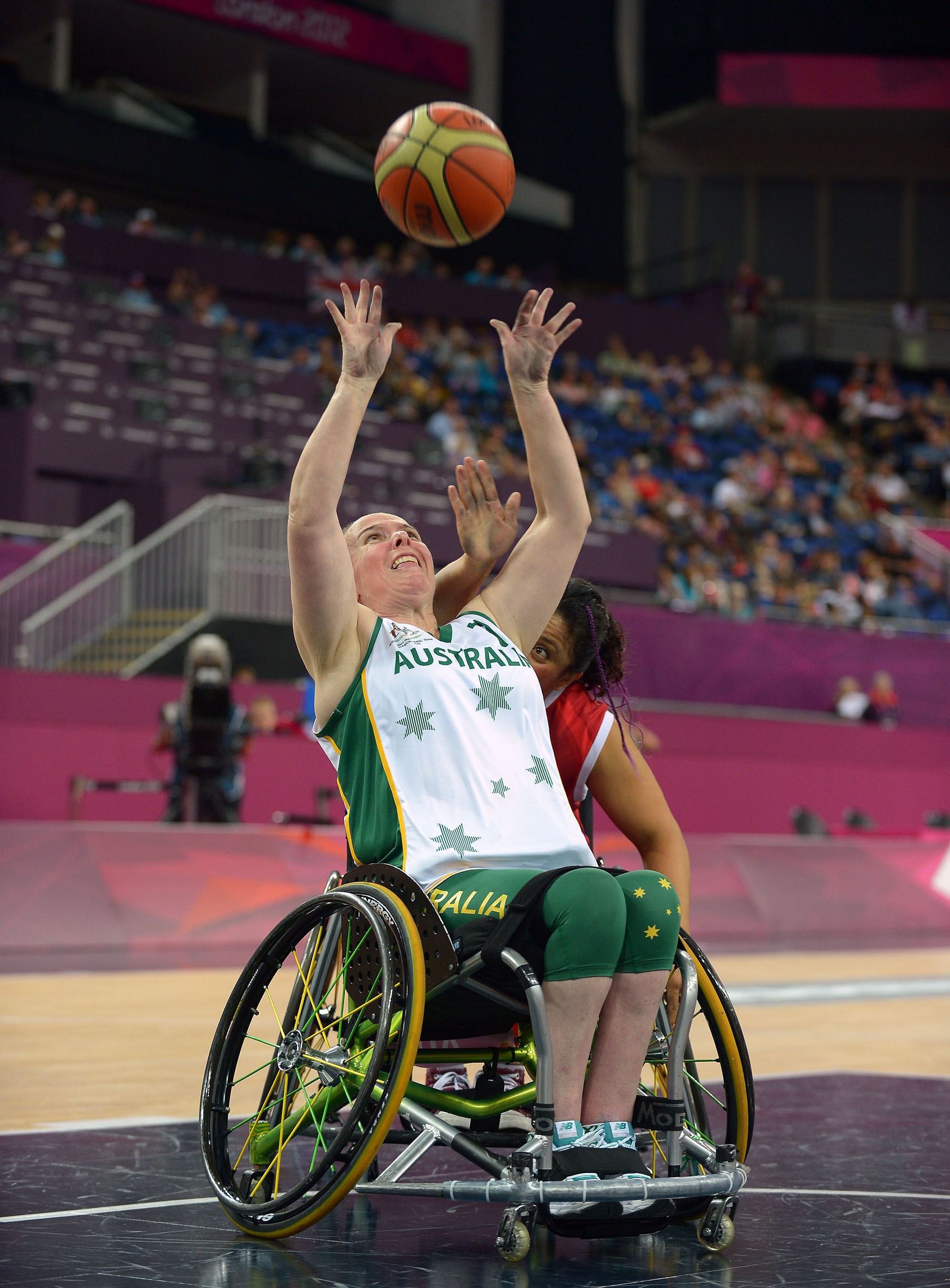
Amanda Carter in the match against Mexico

The Gliders put Mexico under intense defensive pressure. Mexico had six team turnovers to the Gliders' one, and wound up with 19 turnovers in total to Australia's 6. Australia scored 18 points from turnovers, compared to 6 for Mexico. Gauci, a two-point player, took a three-pointer to take the score to 17–8. Mexico was unable to recover from Australia's high scoring from Merritt, who ultimately scored 14 points with 70 per cent shooting, and Crispin, who scored twelve points with 67 per cent shooting. The teams went into the quarter-time break with the score 21 points to 10. Mexico fell further behind in the second quarter. Amanda Carter immediately stole the ball from Mexico, which let Merritt score two points. A few minutes later, Carter, assisted by Chaplin, scored a basket from the paint, and was fouled in the process. A successful free throw made the score 36–16. Another steal by Merritt led to a fast break, bringing her contribution to ten points, and the score to 38–16. At the halftime break, the score was 44–20.

In the third quarter, a team turnover and a series of missed shots by Hill, Kean and Crispin allowed Mexico to outscore Australia by one point, leaving the score at 50–27 at the end of the quarter. The final quarter saw Australia's Del Toso miss a shot at one end, and Mexico's Floralia Estrada Bernal miss one at the other. Stewart also missed, before a Mexican turnover led to the first score of the quarter, by Stewart. Mexico's Rocio Torres Lopez scored in response. Another shot by Stewart missed, but Carter took an offensive rebound, and scored. Turnovers by Kean and Del Toso allowed Mexico to put four points on the board, but successive fouls sent Kean to the free-throw line to score three points in response.

Merritt brought the score to 59–35 with her seventh scoring shot. As the game drew to a close, there were several missed shots by Sarah Vinci and Hill, but Mexico was unable to capitalise on the opportunities, continuing to miss shots and turn over the ball. With nineteen seconds of play remaining, Hill took a two-point shot from inside the paint; attracting a foul, she scored another point from a free throw. Although Mexico's Wendy Garcia Amador scored the last two points of the game, her team lost to Australia 62–37.

Women's wheelchair basketball – Quarterfinal – Australia vs Mexico – Statistics

Women's wheelchair basketball – Quarterfinal – Australia vs Mexico
No.	Name	Class	Minutes	Points	2 points		3 points		Free throws		Rebounds			Assists	Turnovers	Steals	Blocked shots	Personal fouls	Fouls drawn
					Made/Attempts	%	Made/Attempts	%	Made/Attempts	%	Offensive	Defensive	Total						
4	Sarah Vinci	1.0	29:12	0	0/2	0	0/0	0	0/0	0	0	3	3	0	0	0	1	0	1
5	Cobi Crispin	4.0	17:08	12	6/9	67	0/0	0	0/2	0	0	2	2	1	1	1	0	0	3
6	Bridie Kean (C)	4.0	18:18	5	2/3	67	0/0	0	1/4	25	1	4	5	2	1	1	0	0	2
7	Amanda Carter	1.0	18:38	5	2/3	67	0/0	0	1/1	100	4	0	4	0	0	1	0	0	1
8	Tina McKenzie	3.0	10:47	0	0/2	0	0/0	0	0/0	0	0	3	3	0	1	0	0	2	0
9	Leanne Del Toso	3.5	12:25	2	1/3	33	0/0	0	0/0	0	0	2	2	1	1	0	0	1	0
10	Clare Nott	1.0	8:43	0	0/0	0	0/0	0	0/0	0	0	3	3	0	0	0	0	0	0
11	Kylie Gauci	2.0	23:27	7	2/7	29	1/1	100	0/0	0	1	0	1	7	0	1	0	0	0
12	Shelley Chaplin	3.5	18:44	6	3/6	50	0/1	0	0/3	0	0	2	2	5	1	0	0	2	3
13	Sarah Stewart	3.0	13:28	6	3/6	50	0/0	0	0/0	0	0	3	3	4	1	0	0	1	1
14	Katie Hill	3.0	10:48	5	2/7	29	0/0	0	1/1	100	0	0	0	0	0	0	0	0	1
15	Amber Merritt	4.5	18:22	14	7/10	70	0/0	0	0/0	0	0	3	3	1	0	2	0	2	1
	Team										1	1	2	0	1	0	0	0	0
	Team totals			62							7	26	33	21	7	6	1	8	13

Source: Women's Wheelchair Basketball – Quarterfinal – Australia vs Mexico – Statistics

=== Semifinal – United States ===
6 September 2012
13:00

Report

Australia	40–39	United States
Scoring by quarter: 10–12, 16–14, 12–2, 2–11
Pts: three players 8 Rebs: Merritt 6 Asts: three players 3		Pts: Murray 18; Rebs: Murray, Schneider 9 Asts: Murray 3

North Greenwich Arena, London
Referees: Sébastien Gauthier (CAN)

Report:

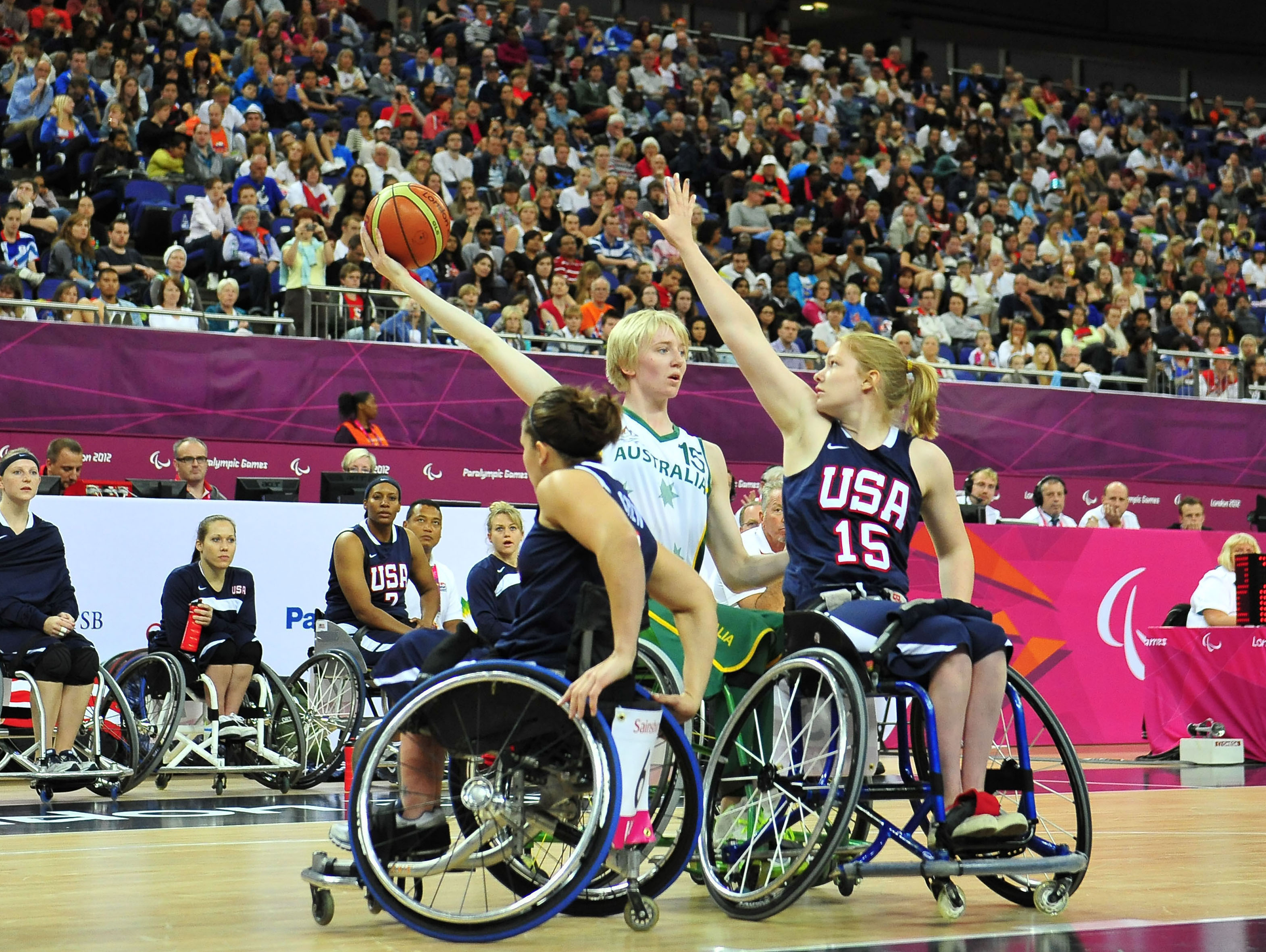
Match against USA. Amber Merritt takes a shot. Team USA's Rose Hollermann attempts to block.

In the semifinal, the Gliders had to beat the reigning champions, Team USA, in front of a small crowd of 4,428 at the North Greenwich Arena. Team USA had first possession and earned the first points of the game, but both teams' shooting was poor, and the score was only 10–12 at quarter time. The second quarter started with Merritt scoring twice to give Australia the lead 14–12. Team USA turned the ball over to the Gliders several times, but they were unable to capitalise on their strong defence, leaving the score tied at 26–26 at half time. In the third quarter, an early goal by Gauci from outside the paint gave the Gliders the lead. A series of steals gave the Gliders additional shots, most of which they missed, but Team USA gave up a series of turnovers, and their shooting was worse than their rivals', resulting in a 10–0 run by the Gliders. Team USA were unable to score at all until the last minute of the quarter. A hurried goal with seconds to go by Hill saw the Gliders leading 38–28. Team USA would ultimately post 28 turnovers to Australia's 17, and the Gliders would score 12 points from turnovers to Team USA's three. Triscari warned his players, "They will come back! We have to stop them!"

In the final quarter, the Australian defence remained strong, but their shooting did not improve. For the entire game, Crispin made only 3 out of 10 attempts, and Merritt just 4 out of 16. Nott, who played the entire game, ended up being the team's most accurate player, with four out of five attempts. Meanwhile, Team USA fought back to 40–39. Three timeouts were taken in the last minute. The game went down to the last seconds. Trailing 40–37 with less than 30 seconds to play, America's Desi Miller scored to have the USA trail by a point. Deliberately fouling Merrit put Miller out of the game, and sent Merritt to the free-throw line. It was a risk, but it paid off; Merritt missed both shots. The second was rebounded by Team USA's Rebecca Murray, who took the ball down the court, in the face of the Gliders' relentless defence. The ball was passed to Rose Hollermann, at 16 the youngest of Team USA's players. Spectators saw Hollermann's shot from the paint hit the ring with a second to go, but the shot clock was not reset. Team USA's Alana Nichols rebounded, and put the ball in the bucket, but not before time ran out and a shot clock violation was called. This left Australia with possession. In another 1.9 seconds, it was all over, and Australia had a controversial one-point win.

Women's wheelchair basketball – Semifinal – Australia vs United States – Statistics

Women's wheelchair basketball – Semifinal – Australia vs United States
No.	Name	Class	Minutes	Points	2 points		3 points		Free throws		Rebounds			Assists	Turnovers	Steals	Blocked shots	Personal fouls	Fouls drawn
					Made/Attempts	%	Made/Attempts	%	Made/Attempts	%	Offensive	Defensive	Total						
4	Sarah Vinci	1.0	8:35	0	0/0	0	0/0	0	0/0	0	0	0	0	0	0	0	0	0	0
5	Cobi Crispin	4.0	24:37	6	3/10	30	0/0	0	0/0	0	1	3	4	1	1	0	1	2	0
6	Bridie Kean (C)	4.0	14:55	2	1/3	33	0/1	0	0/0	0	0	3	3	3	0	2	0	2	2
7	Amanda Carter	1.0	0	0	0/0	0	0/0	0	0/0	0	0	0	0	0	0	0	0	0	0
8	Tina McKenzie	3.0	0	0	0/0	0	0/0	0	0/0	0	0	0	0	0	0	0	0	0	0
9	Leanne Del Toso	3.5	0	0	0/0	0	0/0	0	0/0	0	0	0	0	0	0	0	0	0	0
10	Clare Nott	1.0	38:37	8	4/5	80	0/0	0	0/0	0	3	1	4	0	2	2	1	3	0
11	Kylie Gauci	2.0	32:48	8	4/14	29	0/0	0	0/0	0	1	0	1	3	7	2	0	3	3
12	Shelley Chaplin	3.5	25:05	0	0/5	0	0/0	0	0/0	0	0	4	4	3	0	2	0	0	3
13	Sarah Stewart	3.0	11:43	4	2/3	67	0/0	0	0/0	0	0	0	0	1	0	0	0	0	1
14	Katie Hill	3.0	21:05	4	2/6	33	0/0	0	0/0	0	0	1	1	1	0	1	0	0	1
15	Amber Merritt	4.5	22:35	8	4/13	31	0/0	0	0/3	0	2	4	6	1	1	0	1	2	3
	Team										1	0	1	0	6	0	0	0	0
	Team totals			40							8	16	24	13	17	9	3	12	13

Source: Women's Wheelchair Basketball – Semifinal – Australia vs United States – Statistics

=== Gold medal match – Germany ===
7 September 2012
21:15

Report

Australia	44–58	Germany
Scoring by quarter: 10–14, 9–12, 9–8, 16–24
Pts: Gauci 15; Rebs: Gauci, Merritt 5 Asts: Crispin, Chaplin 5		Pts: Adermann 19; Rebs: Mohnen 9 Asts: Adermann, Zeyen 5

North Greenwich Arena, London
Referees: Sergio Giordano (CAN)

Report:

The Gliders would have to defeat Germany in front of a capacity crowd of 12,985 at the North Greenwich Arena to win the gold medal. Australia had narrowly defeated the German team 48–46 in the Gliders World Challenge in Sydney a few months earlier, and at that point had beaten them three of the previous four times they had played.

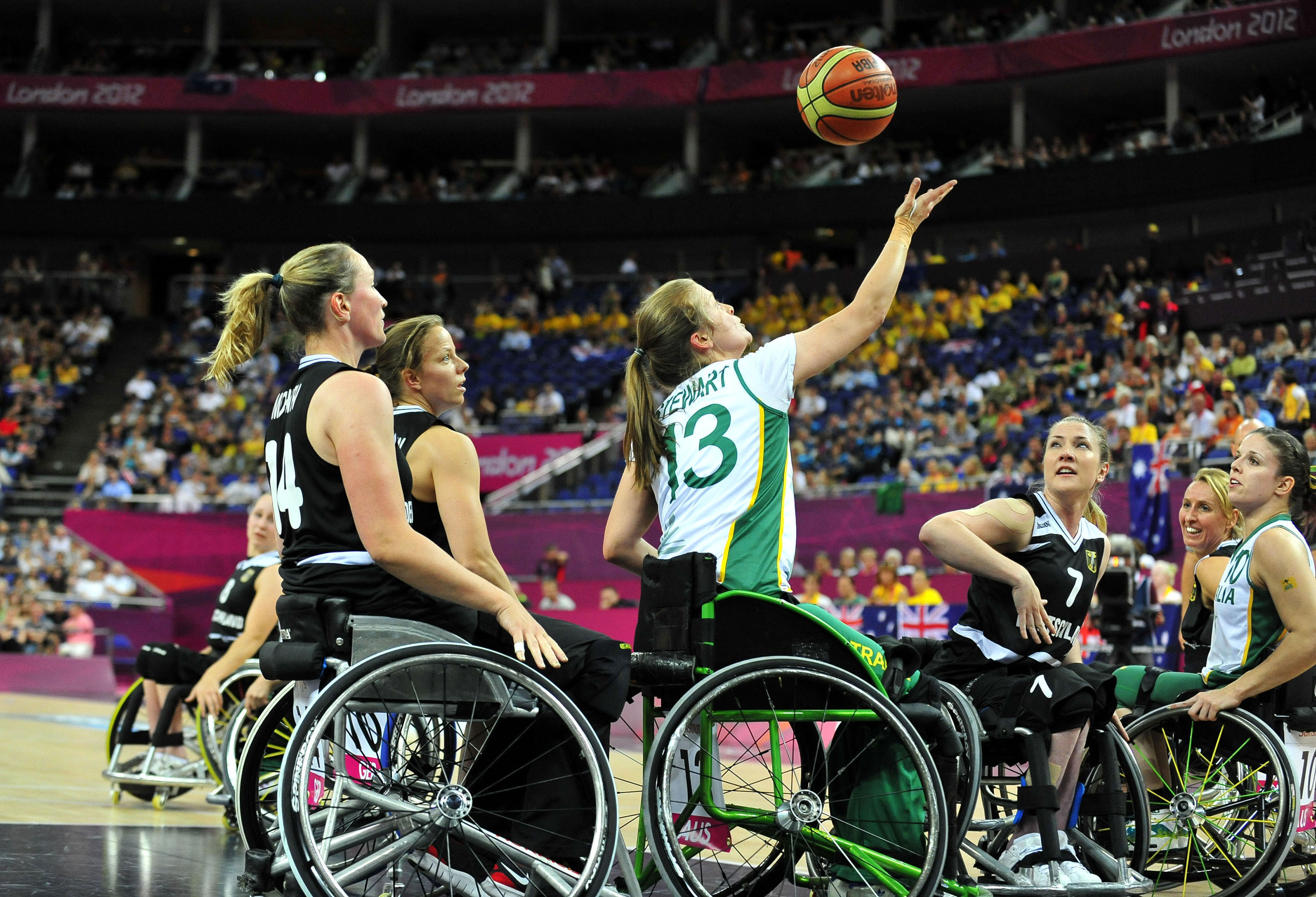
Match against Germany. Sarah Stewart takes possession, watched by Germany's Annika Zeyen, Marina Mohnen, Gesche Schünemann, Edina Müller and Maria Kühn, and Australia's Clare Nott.

Once again, Stewart took the opening tip. A defensive rebound by Kean after Germany missed two free throws resulted in the Gliders scoring first, with Gauci assisting Crispin. The Gliders used the same game plan that had defeated the United States, employing a strong defence against a normally high-scoring team. At first, they were successful; with three minutes to go in the quarter, despite several missed shots, Australia was ahead 10–4. In the last minutes, Germany scored ten points that gave them a 10–14 lead at quarter time.

In the second quarter, Germany extended their lead to ten points, but Kean scored a point from a free throw, and then, with seconds left on the clock, stole the ball, enabling Crispin to score, so the Gliders were only seven points behind at half time. The Gliders won the third quarter, but only by 9–8. They still had six points to make up, with strong defences from both teams. Gauci scored the most in this game, with 15 points, including a three-pointer, with five assists and four rebounds. In the end, the Gliders lost by fourteen points, 44–58.

Triscari felt that the Gliders did not put enough pressure on the Germans, and that their shooting was not accurate enough. In particular, they scored a dismal one point from twelve attempts from the free throw line. Basketball Australia CEO Kristina Keneally praised the Gliders' efforts. "The Gliders have been nothing short of brilliant at the Paralympic Games," she said, "and this Silver Medal is just reward for their outstanding performance. This is the Gliders' fourth consecutive Paralympic Medal – a remarkable achievement. All of the players, coaches and support staff have done a fantastic job and we can’t wait to greet them on their return home."

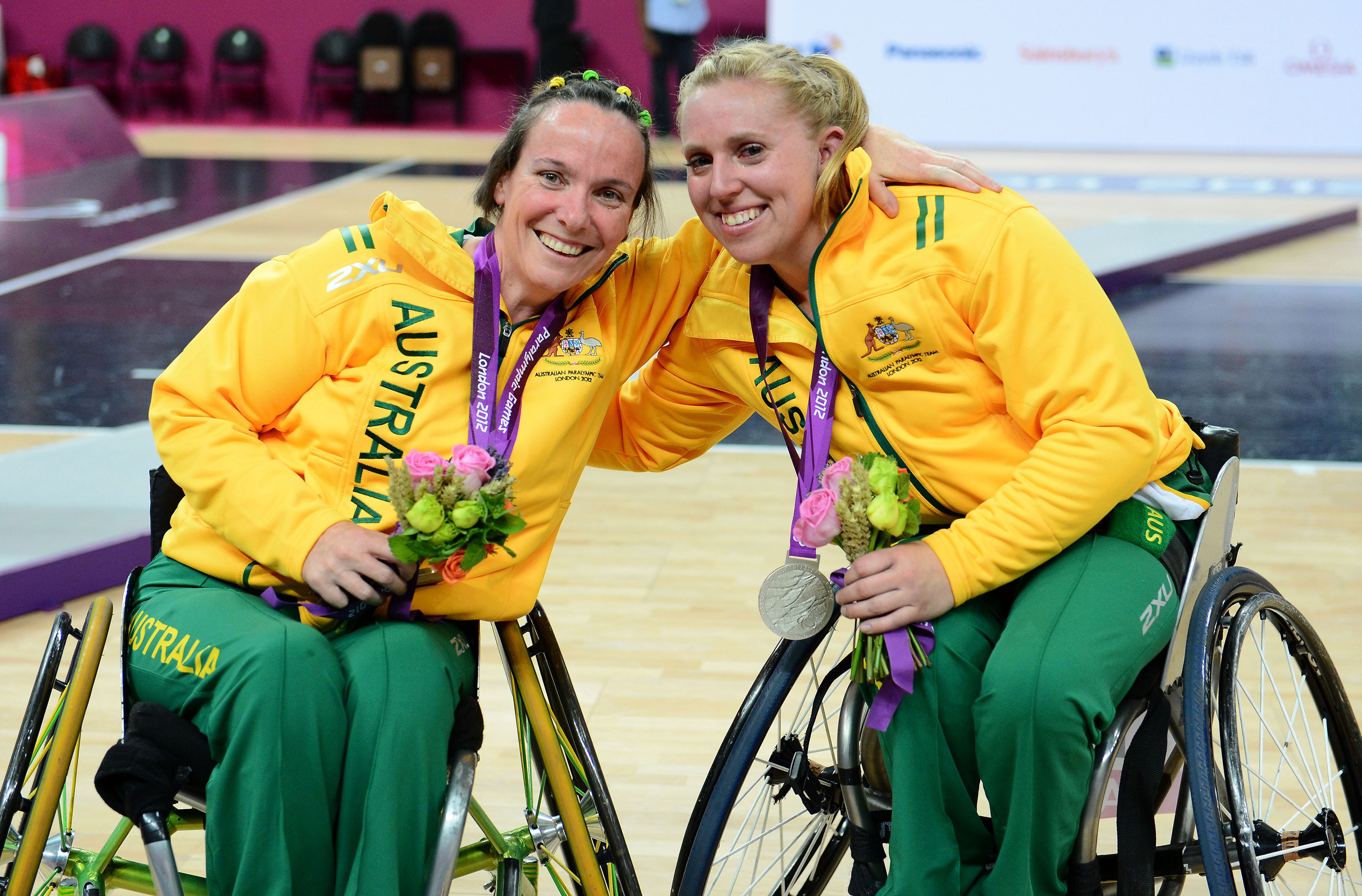
Amanda Carter and Shelley Chaplin with their medals

In 2013, Keneally announced a four-year development program for the Gliders that included the appointment of a full-time head coach for the first time, based at the National Wheelchair Centre of Excellence at the New South Wales Institute of Sport in Homebush, New South Wales. In May 2013, Tom Kyle was appointed the Gliders' new head coach.

"We have had the opportunity to play Germany a fair bit in our preparation so our game plan was to have strong defensive pressure and take it from there", Kean told the media. "It started off really good for us, unfortunately they just got a couple more runs than us and that's the way it goes sometimes. They played a great game. We stuck together 12 deep from the second the buzzer started, to that end buzzer and no one gave up. I think that we can hold our heads high because of that. I guess the plan is, next four years, Rio we go one more."

It was not to be. The Gliders did not qualify for the 2016 Rio Paralympics after finishing second to China at the 2015 Asia Oceania Qualifying Tournament.

Women's wheelchair basketball – Gold medal game – Australia vs Germany – Statistics

Women's wheelchair basketball – Gold medal game – Australia vs Germany – Statistics
No.	Name	Class	Minutes	Points	2 points		3 points		Free throws		Rebounds			Assists	Turnovers	Steals	Blocked shots	Personal fouls	Fouls drawn
					Made/Attempts	%	Made/Attempts	%	Made/Attempts	%	Offensive	Defensive	Total						
4	Sarah Vinci	1.0	10:39	2	1/2	50	0/0	0	0/0	0	0	0	0	0	0	1	0	0	0
5	Cobi Crispin	4.0	29:40	6	3/11	27	0/0	0	0/2	0	3	2	5	0	3	1	0	3	4
6	Bridie Kean (C)	4.0	13:02	1	0/2	0	0/0	0	1/2	50	1	3	4	0	1	1	0	2	1
7	Amanda Carter	1.0	0	0	0/0	0	0/0	0	0/0	0	0	0	0	0	0	0	0	0	0
8	Tina McKenzie	3.0	0	0	0/0	0	0/0	0	0/0	0	0	0	0	0	0	0	0	0	0
9	Leanne Del Toso	3.5	0	0	0/0	0	0/0	0	0/0	0	0	0	0	0	0	0	0	0	0
10	Clare Nott	1.0	33:12	6	3/6	50	0/1	0	0/2	0	1	1	2	0	0	0	0	3	1
11	Kylie Gauci	2.0	36:09	15	6/14	43	1/4	25	0/2	0	1	3	4	5	0	1	0	4	4
12	Shelley Chaplin	3.5	26:58	8	4/8	50	0/0	0	0/2	0	1	1	2	5	1	1	0	3	1
13	Sarah Stewart	3.0	14:12	2	1/2	50	0/0	0	0/0	0	1	3	4	0	0	1	0	1	0
14	Katie Hill	3.0	21:57	4	2/4	50	0/0	0	0/0	0	0	1	1	0	2	1	0	2	1
15	Amber Merritt	4.5	14:11	0	0/5	0	0/0	0	0/2	0	1	4	5	0	1	0	0	1	3
	Team										1	0	1	0	2	0	0	0	0
	Team totals			44							10	18	28	10	10	7	0	19	15

Source: Women's Wheelchair Basketball – Gold Medal Game – Statistics

Australia – Series – Statistics

Australia – After seven games
No.	Name	Class	Games	Minutes	Points	2 points		3 points		Free throws		Rebounds			Assists	Turnovers	Steals	Blocked shots	Personal fouls	Fouls drawn
						Made/Attempts	%	Made/Attempts	%	Made/Attempts	%	Offensive	Defensive	Total						
4	Sarah Vinci	1.0	7	125	8	4/9	44	–/–	—	–/–	—	2	6	8	1	2	2	1	4	1
5	Cobi Crispin	4.0	7	180	72	33/77	43	–/–	—	6/14	43	13	34	47	11	13	4	1	18	17
6	Bridie Kean	4.0	7	109	16	7/26	27	0/1	0	2/8	25	5	27	32	6	4	6	—	8	8
7	Amanda Carter	1.0	3	38	7	3/5	60	–/–	—	1/1	100	4	—	4	—	1	1	—	1	1
8	Tina McKenzie	3.0	2	18	—	0/2	0	–/–	—	–/–	—	—	4	4	2	1	—	—	2	–
9	Leanne Del Toso	3.5	3	24	4	2/7	29	–/–	—	–/–	—	2	7	9	2	3	—	—	2	1
10	Clare Nott	1.0	7	212	37	18/32	56	0/1	0	1/7	14	6	14	20	7	7	4	3	10	4
11	Kylie Gauci	2.0	7	186	54	24/68	35	2/6	33	0/2	0	4	11	15	28	14	5	—	9	12
12	Shelley Chaplin	3.5	7	166	26	13/48	27	0/1	0	0/7	0	5	15	20	28	10	4	—	12	13
13	Sarah Stewart	3.0	7	83	25	12/27	44	–/–	—	1/5	20	4	12	16	12	2	2	—	7	6
14	Katie Hill	3.0	7	107	25	12/30	40	–/–	—	1/1	100	1	7	8	6	4	2	—	4	4
15	Amber Merritt	4.5	7	153	83	40/77	52	0/1	0	3/12	25	11	30	41	6	8	5	2	16	16
	Team											7	12	19						
	Team totals				357	168/408	41	2/10	20	15/57	26	64	179	243	109	84	35	7	93	83

Source: Women's Wheelchair Basketball – Statistics
