= John Triscari =

Australian women's wheelchair basketball coach (born 1957)

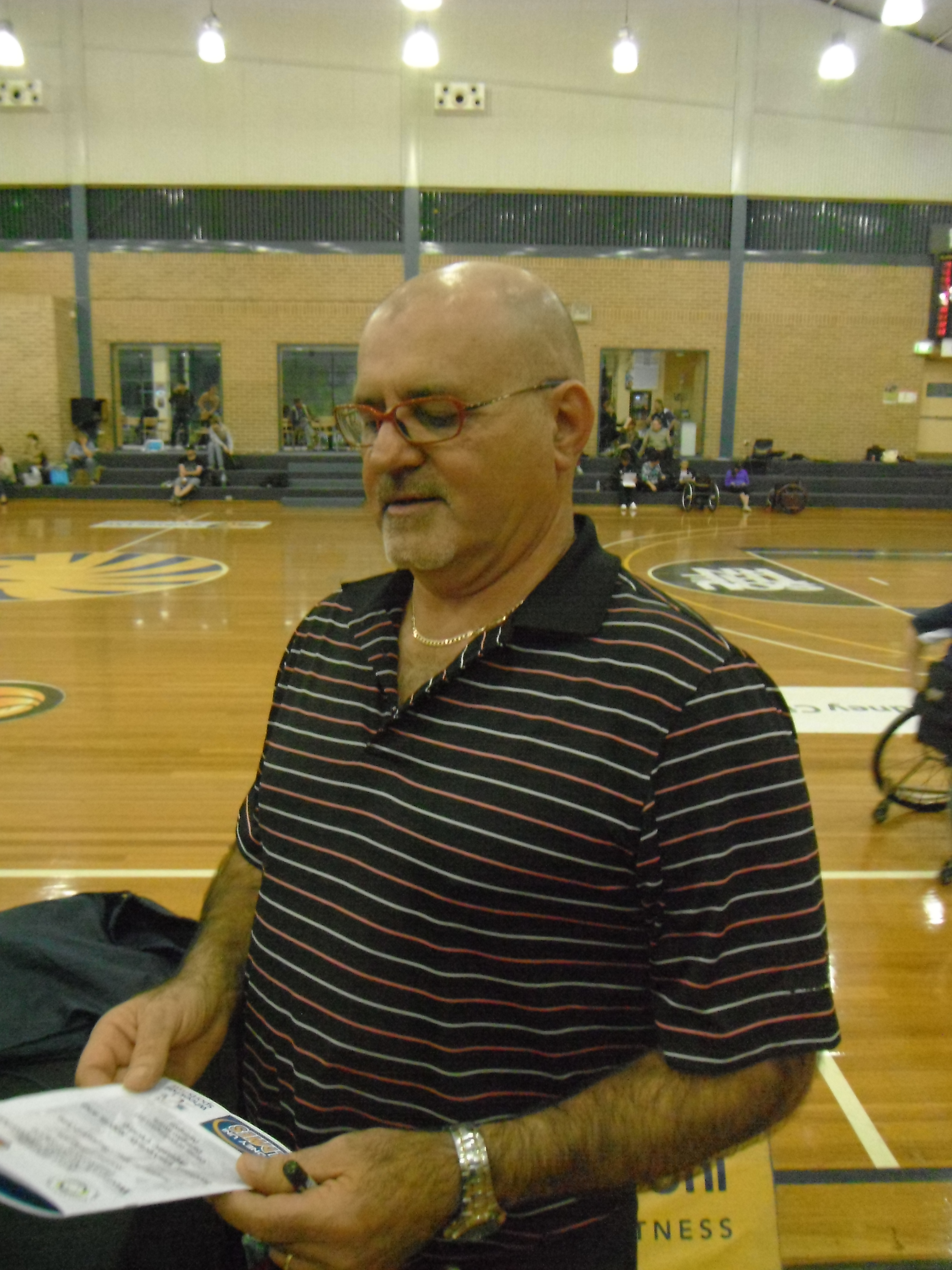
- Triscari in 2013

Personal information
- Born: 4 August 1957 (age 69)

Sport
- Country: Australia
- Sport: Basketball
Medal record
Wheelchair basketball
Paralympic Games
Silver medal – second place	2012 London	Women's Wheelchair basketball

John Triscari (born 4 August 1957) is an Australian basketball coach. He was the coach of the Australia women's national wheelchair basketball team at the 2012 Summer Paralympics, where the team won a silver medal, and of the Perth Western Stars in the Women's National Wheelchair Basketball League (WNWBL), taking them to a national championship in 2013. He has coached the Rockingham Flames, Mandurah Magic, Cockburn Cougars and South West Slammers in the Western Australian State Basketball League (SBL) and the Perth Wheelcats in the National Wheelchair Basketball League.

== Teaching ==
John Triscari was born on 4 August 1957. During the 2010s, Triscari served as the head of health and physical education at Rockingham Senior High School and as deputy principal of Safety Bay Senior High School, a position he retains as of 2024.

== Basketball ==
As a coach, he had stints with the Rockingham Flames and Mandurah Magic in the Western Australian State Basketball League (SBL). In 2015, he coached the Kalamunda Eastern Suns men's team. In 2016 and 2017, he coached the Cockburn Cougars women's team. The team reached the quarter finals both years. In 2019, he returned to the SBL as coach of the South West Slammers men's team, but left after one season. He served as assistant coach with the Perry Lakes Hawks men's team in 2020, 2021 and 2022. He joined the Willetton Tigers women's team as assistant coach in 2025.

== Wheelchair basketball ==
=== Perth Western Stars ===
Triscari was appointed the coach of the Perth Western Stars in the Women's National Wheelchair Basketball League (WNWBL) in 2007. "Basically," he told the media, "my goal is to develop the women's team to get them winning finals." This goal proved to be elusive. Fronted by young talents Cobi Crispin and Amber Merritt, the Western Stars made the WNWBL grand final in 2008, only to be beaten by the dominant Sydney-based Hills Hornets. The Hornets delivered a second grand final loss to the Stars in 2009. The Western Stars went into the grand final as favourites in 2010, but suffered yet another defeat at the hands of the Sydney team, now renamed the Sydney Uni Flames. In 2012, the Western Stars made the grand final again, only to be defeated this time by the Victoria-based Dandenong Rangers. Finally, in the 2013 grand final, the Western Stars came from being nine points down at three quarter time to claim their first ever WNWBL championship.

=== Gliders ===
In 2009, Triscari was named as the coach of the Australian women's national wheelchair basketball team, commonly known as the Gliders.

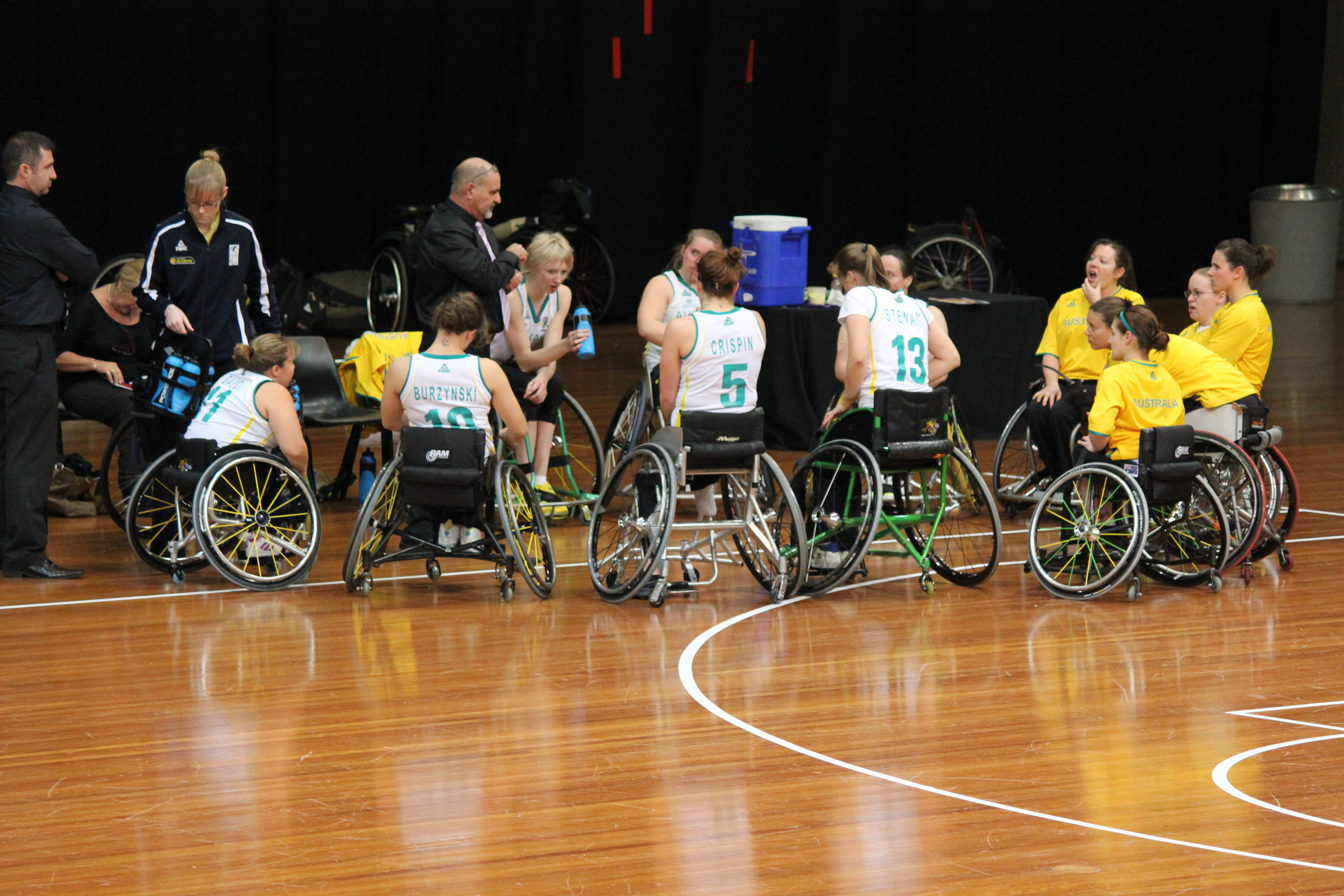
John Triscari (in black shirt and white tie) talks to his national team players.

Triscari's first tournament as the Gliders' coach was the 2009 Osaka Cup in Japan in February 2009. It was an auspicious start, with the Gliders beating the 2008 Summer Paralympics champions, the USA team, 57–38. Despite losses to Canada and the host nation, the Gliders came back to defeat the USA again and claim the Osaka Cup. The Gliders would win the Osaka Cup again under Triscai in 2010 and 2012, and were runners-up in 2011.

The Gliders competed in the 2010 Wheelchair Basketball World Championship in Birmingham, where they finished fourth, and the Four Nations Tournament in Canada in July and August 2010, where they defeated the USA 55–37 to claim the gold medal. A major hurdle was qualifying for the 2012 Summer Paralympic Games in London. The team had to finish first or second at the 2011 Asia Oceania Zone Championship in Goyang, South Korea. A loss to Japan meant that the Gliders had to beat Korea to qualify for London, which they did, 84–11. In the run-up to the London games in 2012, the Gliders won the Osaka Cup in Japan, came second in another four-nations tournament in Frankfurt, defeated Germany in the Gliders World Challenge in Sydney, and the United States in the BT Paralympic World Cup in Manchester.

The Australia women's national wheelchair basketball team at the 2012 Summer Paralympics posted wins against Brazil, Great Britain, and the Netherlands, but lost to Canada. It was enough to advance the Gliders to the quarter-finals, where they beat Mexico. The Gliders then defeated the United States by a point to set up a final clash with Germany. The Gliders lost 44–58, and earned the silver medal.

Triscari received a Coach of the Year Award from the Western Australian Department of Sports and Recreation in 2012, and again in 2013. He was succeeded as head coach of the Gliders by Tom Kyle in May 2013.

== Perth Wheelcats ==
Triscari was the coach of the Perth Wheelcats team in the National Wheelchair Basketball League in 2021.
