= Triscari =

Triscari is a surname of Italian origin. Notable people with the surname include:

- Gemma Triscari (born 1990), Australian cricketer
- John Triscari (born 1957), Australian basketball coach
