= Tom Kyle =

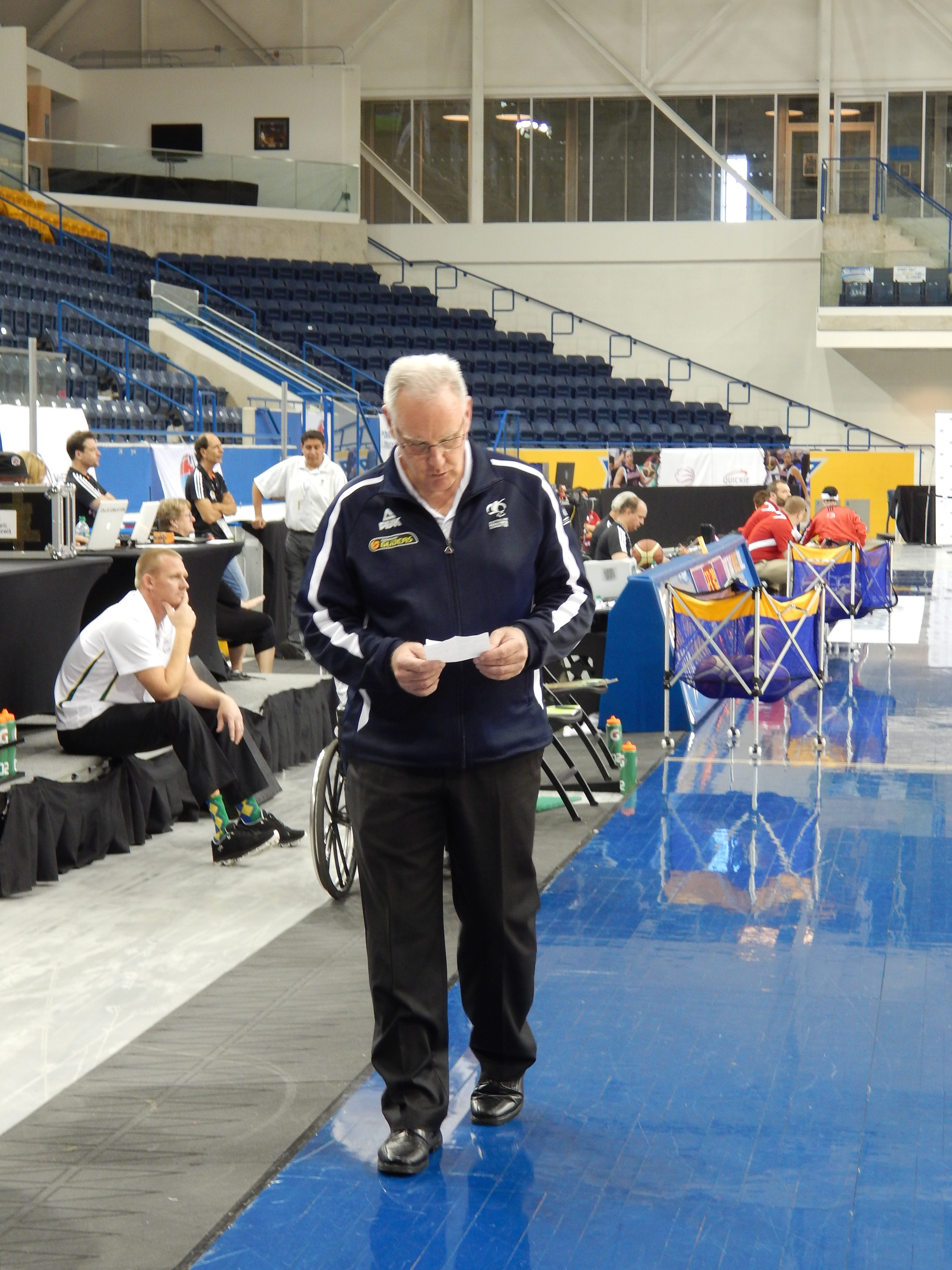
- Tom Kyle at the 2014 Women's World Wheelchair Basketball Championship in Toronto

Personal information
- Nationality: Australia
- Born: 5 June 1959 (age 67)

Sport
- Country: Australia
- Sport: Wheelchair basketball
- Event: Women's team
- Club: Queensland Spinning Bullets
- Team: Australian women's national wheelchair basketball team

Achievements and titles
- Paralympic finals: 2012 Summer Paralympics
Medal record
Wheelchair basketball
Paralympic Games
Silver medal – second place	2012 London	Men's Wheelchair basketball
World Championship
Gold medal – first place	2010 Birmingham	Men's Wheelchair basketball

Tom Kyle (born 15 June 1959) is an Australian wheelchair basketball coach who coaches the Queensland Spinning Bullets and the Australian women's national wheelchair basketball team. He was assistant coach of the Australian men's national wheelchair basketball team from 2009 to 2013, during which time it won gold at the IWBF Wheelchair Basketball World Championship, and silver at the 2012 Summer Paralympics in London.

== Biography ==
Tom Kyle was born on 15 June 1959 in Cooma, New South Wales, where his father worked for the Snowy Mountains scheme. As a boy he played cricket, and was captain of the Australian Capital Territory side at the age of 12. He also played rugby league, rugby union, Australian football, soccer and tennis. He began playing basketball when he was 12 or 13, and played with the Cooma Under 18 team when he was 14, and the senior men's team when he was 16. At that age he also began coaching, his first team being an Under 14 basketball side.

Kyle decided to become a basketball coach, and he repeated Year 12 in order to get sufficient marks for a scholarship to study Physical Education at the Wollongong Institute of Education, which merged with the University of Wollongong in 1982. He completed a double major in Health and Physical Education, receiving degrees from both the Wollongong Institute of Education and the University of Wollongong, from which he graduated in 1983. While there he played basketball for the university, and coached some university sides, learning practical coaching skills from Adrian Hurley.

After graduation, Kyle married, and moved to Brisbane, where he began teaching and coaching basketball and tennis at Anglican Church Grammar School. He became involved with the Brisbane Bullets, the local National Basketball League team, who trained at the school, and coached junior basketball. In 1985, he moved to Sydney, where he looked after the sports centre at the Harbord Diggers Memorial Club, and coached the Manly-Warringah Basketball senior men's and teams. He was director of the Warringah Aquatic Centre for a time before returning to Brisbane in 1989, to take up a job as a marketing officer at the Brisbane City Council Department of Recreation. While there he coached basketball at Marist College Ashgrove, which his two sons attended. He started his own IT company, selling software he had written that managed leisure centres. In 2000 he joined Jupiters Hotel and Casino as a business analyst. By 2003 his sons had graduated from high school and he had divorced his first wife. He accepted an offer to coach basketball at Villanova College, and worked various jobs, eventually joining Suncorp Metway as a project manager.

In 2008 Kyle and his second wife Jane became coach and team manager respectively of the Brisbane Spinning Bullets, Queensland's National Wheelchair Basketball League (NWBL) team. Through this he got to know Ben Ettridge, who coached a rival NWBL team, the Perth Wheelcats, but also the Australian men's national wheelchair basketball team, known as the Rollers. At Ettridge's invitation, he participated in a national training camp in Canberra. He then accepted an offer from Ettridge to join the Rollers at a training camp in Varese, and the Paralympic World Cup in Manchester, quitting his job at Subcorp Metway to do so. Afterwards, he accepted another offer from Ettridge, to become an assistant coach of the Under 23 national side at the 2009 IWBF U23 World Wheelchair Basketball Championship in Paris. He became an assistant coach of the Rollers in 2010, and participated in the Rollers' campaign at the 2012 Summer Paralympics in London, where they won silver. In 2013, he became head coach of the Under 23 national side, selecting David Gould, who had been the assistant coach in London of the Australian women's national wheelchair basketball team, known as the Gliders.

After London, Basketball Australia decided to appoint a full-time head coach for the Gliders for the first time. A selection panel chaired by Basketball Australia's General Manager of High Performance, Steven Icke that also included Rollers' head coach Ettridge, former Australian Opals head coach Jan Stirling and the General Manager of Sport at the Australian Paralympic Committee, Michael Hartung, chose Kyle. In announcing his appointment, the chief executive officer of Basketball Australia, Kristina Keneally, said that "in Tom, we have a coach who has the ability to lead the team to future success and understands the expectations on the Gliders program." Gould became his assistant coach, and Jane Kyle became the team manager. Troy Sachs also became an assistant coach in 2014. At the 2014 Women's World Wheelchair Basketball Championship though, the Gliders came a disappointing sixth. The Gliders did not qualify for the 2016 Paralympic Games in Rio de Janeiro after finishing second to China at the 2015 Asia Oceania Qualifying Tournament. In August 2016, David Gould succeeded him as the Gliders' coach. Kyle went to Rio as assistant coach of the Rollers.

== Achievements ==
- 2009: Gold at Paralympic World Cup (Australian Rollers)
- 2010: Gold at Wheelchair Basketball World Championship (Australian Rollers)
- 2011: NWBL Coach of the Year
- 2011: Sporting Wheelies and Disabled Association Coach of the Year
- 2012: Silver at 2012 Summer Paralympic Games (Australian Rollers)
