= Paralympic World Cup =

Annual international multi-sport event

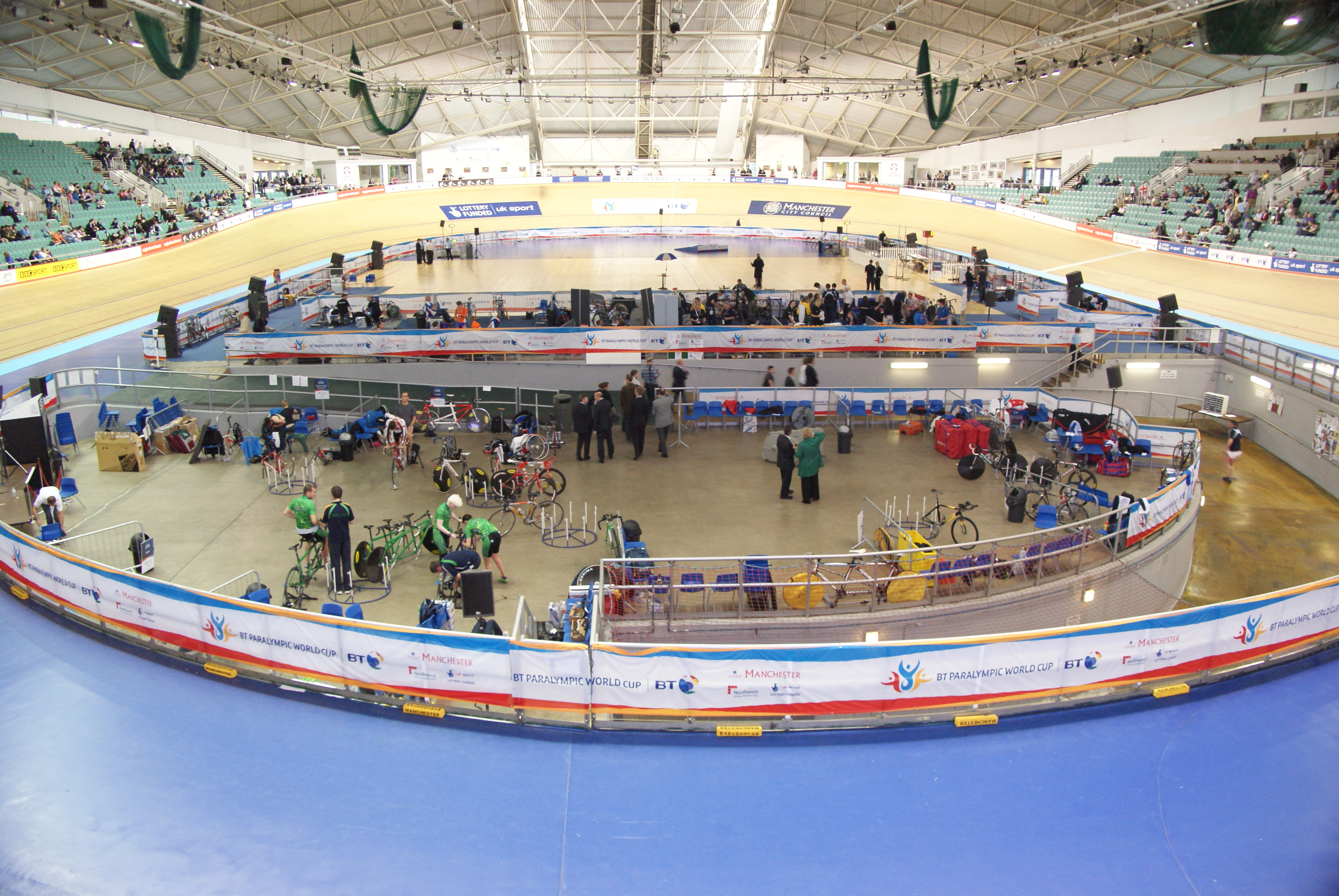
Cycling at the Manchester Velodrome, during the 2009 World Cup.

The Paralympic World Cup was an annual international multi-sport event for elite athletes with a disability, that was hosted in Manchester, England, from 2005 until 2012. It was announced in 2013, that the Paralympic World Cup had been scrapped for the 2013 season, in favour of a "new disability multi-sport event". It was organized by the British Paralympic Association (BPA) in coordination with the International Paralympic Committee (IPC).

== History ==
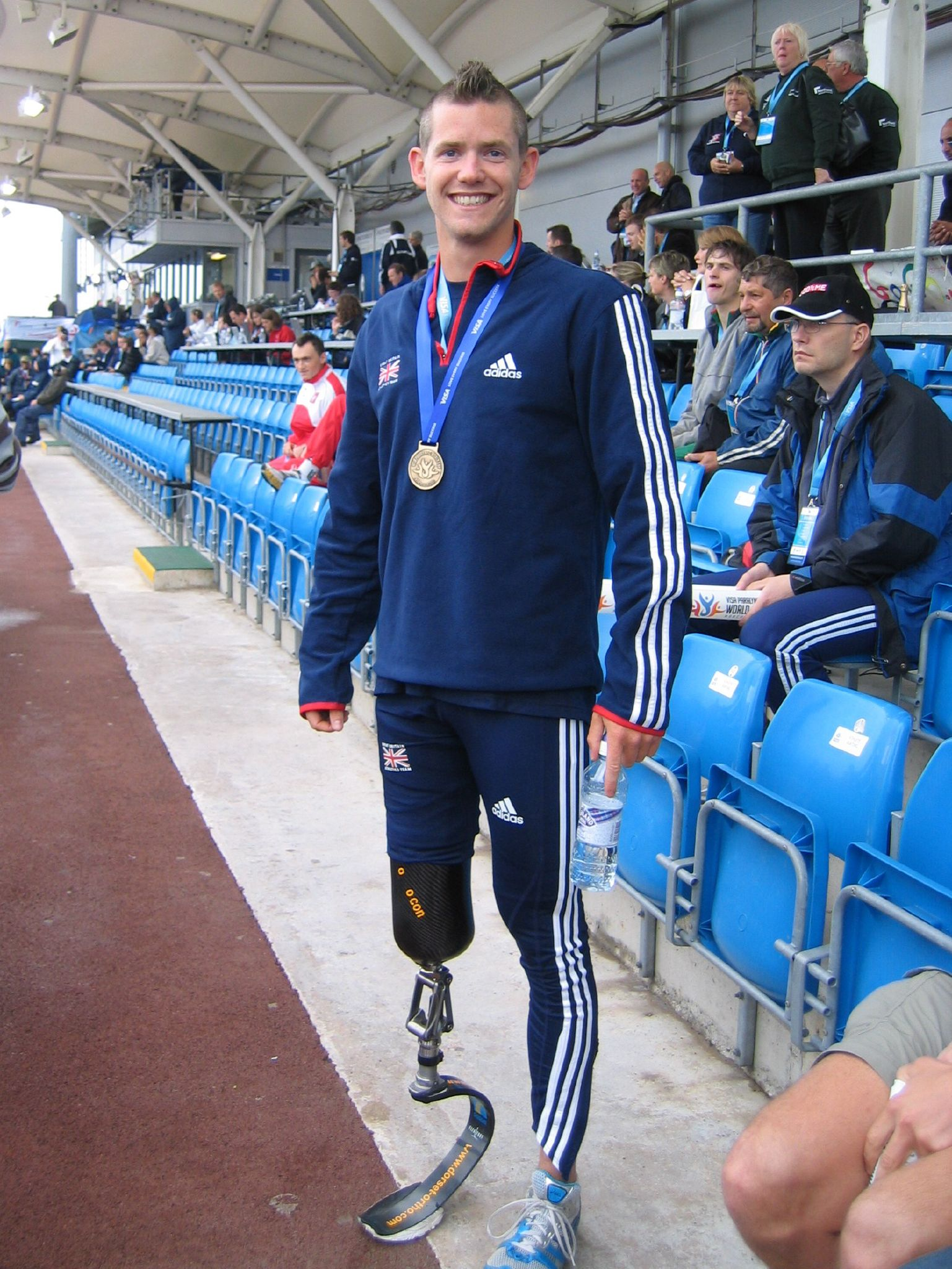
British sprinter John McFall, after taking the gold in the men's 200 metres T42 (single amputation above the knee) at the 2007 World Cup.

From 2010, athletes were divided into four teams: Great Britain, Europe, Americas and one team with the rest of the world. Athletes' individual performances also counted towards a team score, and the winning team got the BT Paralympic World Cup trophy.

Prior to 2011, the event was broadcast by the BBC with international highlights available. Prior to 2011, the credit card company Visa was the title sponsor for the event.

In 2011, the event's title sponsor was BT (British Telecommumications plc). For 2011 and 2012, Channel 4 was the host broadcaster.

== Collaborations ==
=== Ottobock ===
Ottobock is a company that works in orthopedic technology. They work to make, fix, and regulate prosthetics, orthotics, wheelchairs, and exoskeletons. In 2012, the company became "The Official Technical Service Provider" of the games. They have provided help to Paralympic athletes since 1988 and technical service at this World Cup since 2007. In 2012, the company was chosen as the Official Technical Service provider of the tournament. They provided a team of orthotists, prosthetists, and technicians of these devices and aided in providing equipment repair and maintenance throughout the games.

== Sports ==
- Athletics (2005–2012)
- Wheelchair basketball (2005–2012) - at the Manchester Regional Arena indoor track
- Swimming (2005–2012) - at the Manchester Aquatics Centre
- Track cycling (2005–2009) - at the Manchester Velodrome
- Football 7-a-side (2010)
- Demonstration sports
  - 2011 Sitting volleyball
  - 2011 Boccia

== Editions ==
| Games | Date | Nations | Athletes | Sports | Notes |
|---|---|---|---|---|---|
| 2005 Visa Paralympic World Cup | 12–15 May | ca 40 | ca 350 | 4 | |
| 2006 Visa Paralympic World Cup | 1–7 May | 40 | 360 | 4 | |
| 2007 Visa Paralympic World Cup | 7–13 May | 47 | ca 350 | 4 | |
| 2008 Paralympic World Cup | | 45 | ca 400 | 4 | |
| 2009 BT Paralympic World Cup | | 40 | over 400 | 4 | |
| 2010 BT Paralympic World Cup | 25–31 May | 28 | 303 | 4 | |
| 2011 BT Paralympic World Cup | 23–28 May | over 30 | over 300 | 3 | |
| 2012 BT Paralympic World Cup | 22-26 May | | | | |

== See also ==
- Paralympic Winter World Cup
- Paralympic Games
