= Gerry Hewson =

Australian wheelchair basketball player and coach

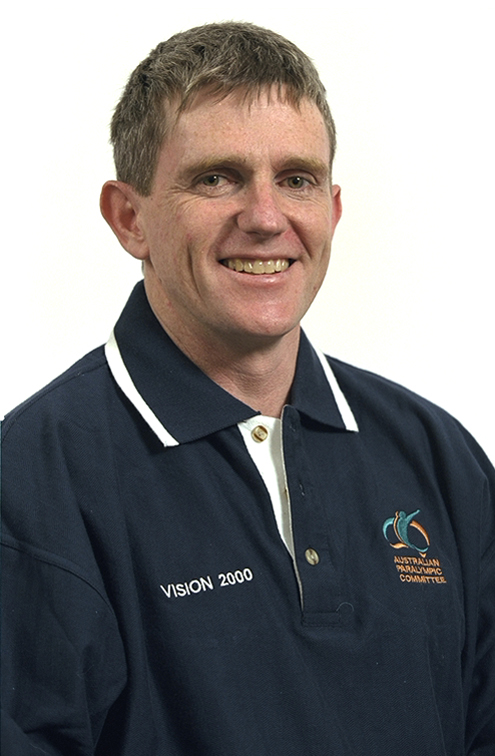
- 2000 Australian Paralympic team portrait of Hewson

Personal information
- Full name: Gerard Benjamin Hewson
- Nationality: Australia
- Born: 5 June 1958 (age 68) Young, New South Wales
Medal record
Wheelchair basketball
Paralympic Games – Athlete
Gold medal – first place	1996 Atlanta	Men's wheelchair basketball
Paralympic Games – Coach
Silver medal – second place	2004 Athens	Women's wheelchair basketball
Bronze medal – third place	2008 Beijing	Women's wheelchair basketball

Gerard "Gerry" Benjamin Hewson, OAM (born 5 June 1958) is an Australian former Paralympic wheelchair basketballer. He has coached wheelchair basketball on the national and international level in Australia. Gerry is now studying horticulture at TAFE and is the producer of Gerard Benjamin honey from Cedar Brush Creek.

== Personal ==
Hewson was born on 5 June 1958 in the New South Wales town of Young.

In 2007 a nude picture of Hewson and his pregnant wife was displayed at the Museum of Sex in New York City as part of an exhibit called "Intimate Encounters", that focused on the sex lives of disabled athletes. The photograph was published by Time Out New York in its section "This week in New York".

== Playing career ==
Hewson was a member of the Australian men's national wheelchair basketball team, competing at four Paralympic Games from 1988 to 2000. He won a gold medal as a member of the team at the 1996 Summer Paralympics, for which he received a Medal of the Order of Australia.

Hewson competed in the National Wheelchair Basketball League (NWBL) in 2001. That year, he was named as the Low Point MVP for the league. In 1999, 2000 and 2001, He was also named as part of the league's All Star Five.

=== Coaching career ===
sparks flying and occasionally you get wheels crash together and they will light up. There is a coating on the edge of the rim that actually lights up like a spark and it stays for about two, three seconds so that kind of splashes around the place every now and then so that is quite exciting and lots of smashing and banging of chairs and people falling out – it is great fun.

— Gerry Hewson discussing the appeal of wheelchair basketball

Hewson was the head coach for the Women's National Wheelchair Basketball League (WNWBL) Sydney Uni Wheelkings in 2011. He was coach of the NWBL's West Sydney Razorbacks from 2004 to 2006. During that time, he helped guide the team to championships during the 2004 and 2005 seasons. In 2006, Hewson was the head coach when the team competed at the Joseph F. Lyttle World Basketball Challenge and the 2006 Gold Cup. When he selected the athletes to make up the 2006 Australian side, he chose seven players who were under the age of twenty-five.

In 2002, Hewson was named assistant coach of the Australian women's national wheelchair team, known as the Gliders. It finished third at the 2002 Gold Cup. In 2003, he was named the team's head coach. He coached the team when they won a silver medal at the 2004 Summer Paralympics in Athens, and to the bronze medal at the 2008 Summer Paralympics in Beijing. In 2011, he also served as the coach of the women's U25 national wheelchair basketball team in the U25 Women's World Championship of Basketball in St. Catharines, Canada. The team won silver at the tournament.

== Influence and legacy ==
Hewson has inspired several Paralympians, including Kylie Gauci. Melanie Domaschenz considers Hewson to be one of the most important figures in her sporting career in terms of helping her to accomplish her sport related goals.

== Recognition ==
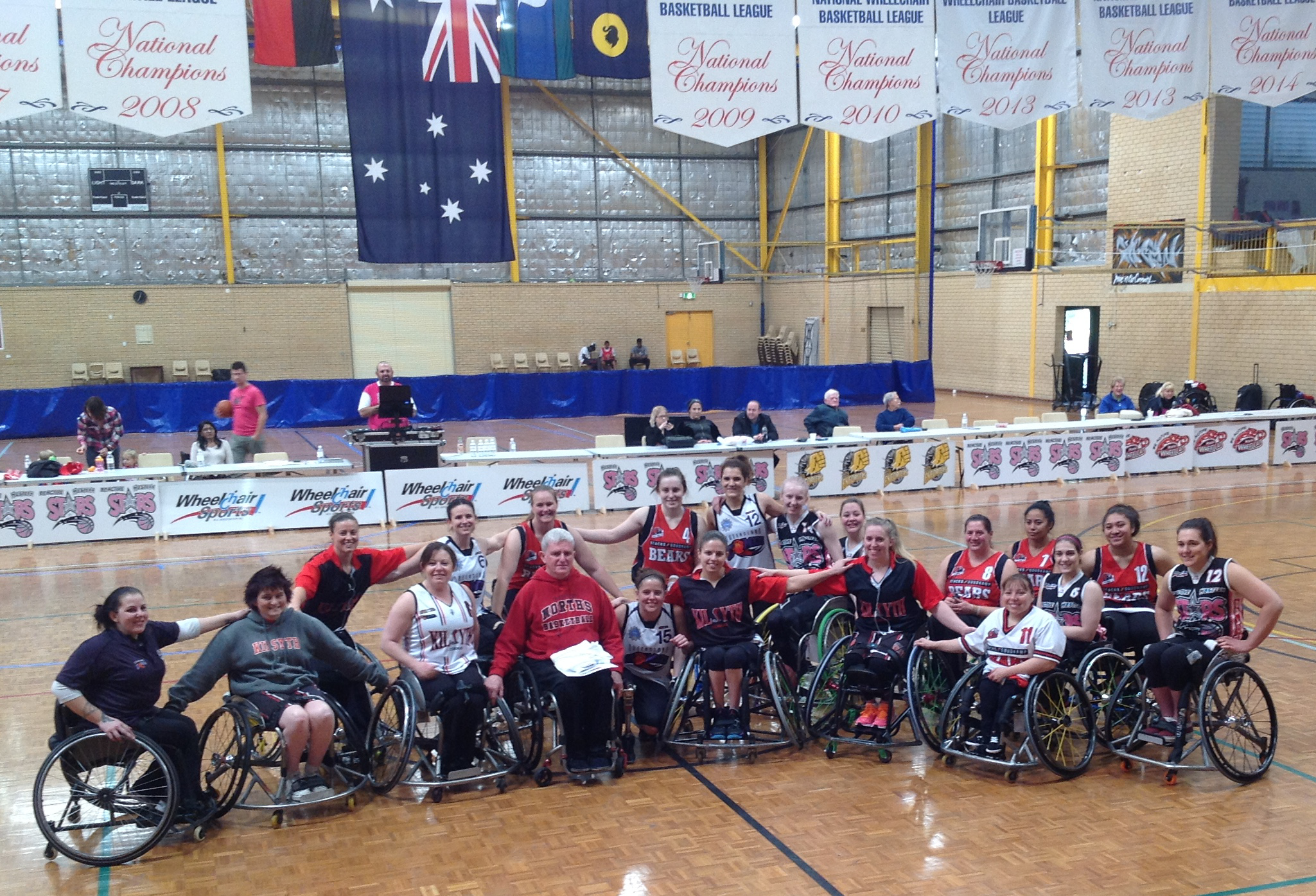
On his retirement as coach in 2015, Hewson is surrounded by players he has coached over the years with the Sachs Goudcamp Bears, the national team and the U25s.

In 2000, Hewson received an Australian Sports Medal. In 2008, the National Wheelchair Basketball League recognised his efforts at promoting the league and the sport of wheelchair basketball by naming him a life member alongside Michael Callahan and Errol Hyde. In 2019, he was inducted into the New South Wales Basketball Hall of Fame.
