= Mellissa Dunn =

Australian wheelchair basketball player

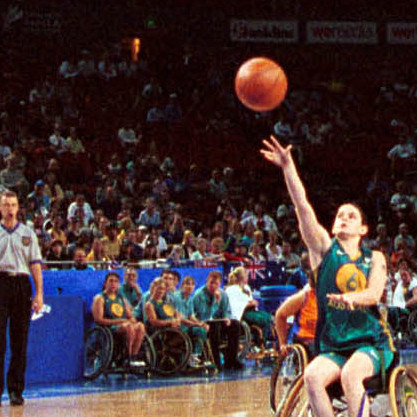
- Dunn takes a free throw during competition at the 2000 Sydney Paralympics

Personal information
- Nationality: Australia
- Born: 21 May 1976 (age 50) Melbourne, Victoria
Medal record
Wheelchair basketball
Paralympic Games
Silver medal – second place	2000 Sydney	Women's wheelchair basketball

Mellissa Dunn (born 21 May 1976) is an Australian wheelchair basketball player. She was part of the silver medal-winning Australia women's national wheelchair basketball team at the 2000 Sydney Paralympics. Dunn is a lawyer and mother who owns a law firm.

== Life ==
Dunn was born on 21 May 1976 in Melbourne. In 1994, she was a passenger in the back of a car which was involved in a traffic collision, breaking her back and neck, as well as further internal injuries. Her condition was severe enough that she was not expected to survive for more than 24 hours, but doctors decided to fly her to Adelaide in the hope that she might be helped. She was in hospital there for over six months and initially, apart from some movement in her toes, was paralysed and unable to walk.

During her recovery in Adelaide she was introduced to basketball, which she enjoyed. She gained some feeling in her legs and she was able to learn to walk, sit and stand. When she returned to Darwin she started a double degree in art and law. She also took up basketball competitively where she made the Northern Territory state team with Nadya Romeo. She was selected for the Australian Women's wheelchair basketball team and she joined them at the Paralympics in Sydney in 2000. The team included her previous teammate Nadya Romeo and Melanie Hall and they came second and were awarded silver medals.

After the Paralympics, Dunn qualified as a lawyer in 2001. The same year she successfully gave birth to a son, which was a difficult event given her previous injuries. In 2002 she was hired by Priestleys Lawyers, a company that deals in personal injuries, health at work as well as criminal law. Over the next few years she balanced the needs of her career and her son, and in 2005 she was able to purchase the law firm where she was working. Dunn said she sees challenges as "stepping stones" to success. As of March 2014, Dunn was still the principal of the company she purchased.
