= Nadya Romeo =

Australian wheelchair basketball player

Personal information
- Nationality: Australia
- Born: 1 June 1971 (age 55) Perth, Western Australia
Medal record
Wheelchair basketball
Paralympic Games
Silver medal – second place	2000 Sydney	Women's wheelchair basketball

Nadya Romeo (sometimes Nadia Romeo) (born 1 June 1971 in Perth, Western Australia) is a wheelchair basketball player from Australia.

== Life ==
Romeo made the Northern Territory state team with Mellissa Dunn. She was selected for the Australian Women's wheelchair basketball team and she joined them at the Paralympics in Sydney in 2000. The team included her previous teammate Dunn and Melanie Hall. She was part of the silver medal-winning Australia women's national wheelchair basketball team at the 2000 Summer Paralympics.
