= Australia women's national wheelchair basketball team =

Australia
- IWBF Ranking: 2nd
- IWBF zone: Asia Oceania
- National federation: Basketball Australia
- Coach: Jeremy Synot
- Nickname: Gliders

Paralympic Games
- Appearances: 7
- Medals: :0:3:1

World Championships
- Appearances: 10
- Medals: :0:0:3
Home	Away
Medal record
Paralympic Games
Silver medal – second place	2000 Sydney	Women's wheelchair basketball
Silver medal – second place	2004 Athens	Women's wheelchair basketball
Bronze medal – third place	2008 Beijing	Women's wheelchair basketball
Silver medal – second place	2012 London	Women's wheelchair basketball
World Wheelchair Basketball Championships
Bronze medal – third place	1994	Women
Bronze medal – third place	1998	Women
Bronze medal – third place	2002	Women
Osaka Cup
Silver medal – second place	2007	Women
Gold medal – first place	2008	Women
Gold medal – first place	2009	Women
Gold medal – first place	2010	Women
Silver medal – second place	2011	Women
Gold medal – first place	2012	Women
Gold medal – first place	2013	Women
Bronze medal – third place	2015	Women
Joseph F. Lyttle World Basketball Challenge
Bronze medal – third place	2008	Women's wheelchair

The Australia women's national wheelchair basketball team is the women's wheelchair basketball side that represents Australia in international competitions. The team is known as the Gliders. The team hasn't won a gold medal for Australia since it began competing at the 1992 Summer Paralympics, however it has won either the silver or bronze medal since the 2000 Summer Paralympics held in Sydney. Gliders finished 6th at the 2014 Women's World Wheelchair Basketball Championship but did not qualify for the 2016 Summer Paralympics.

== History ==
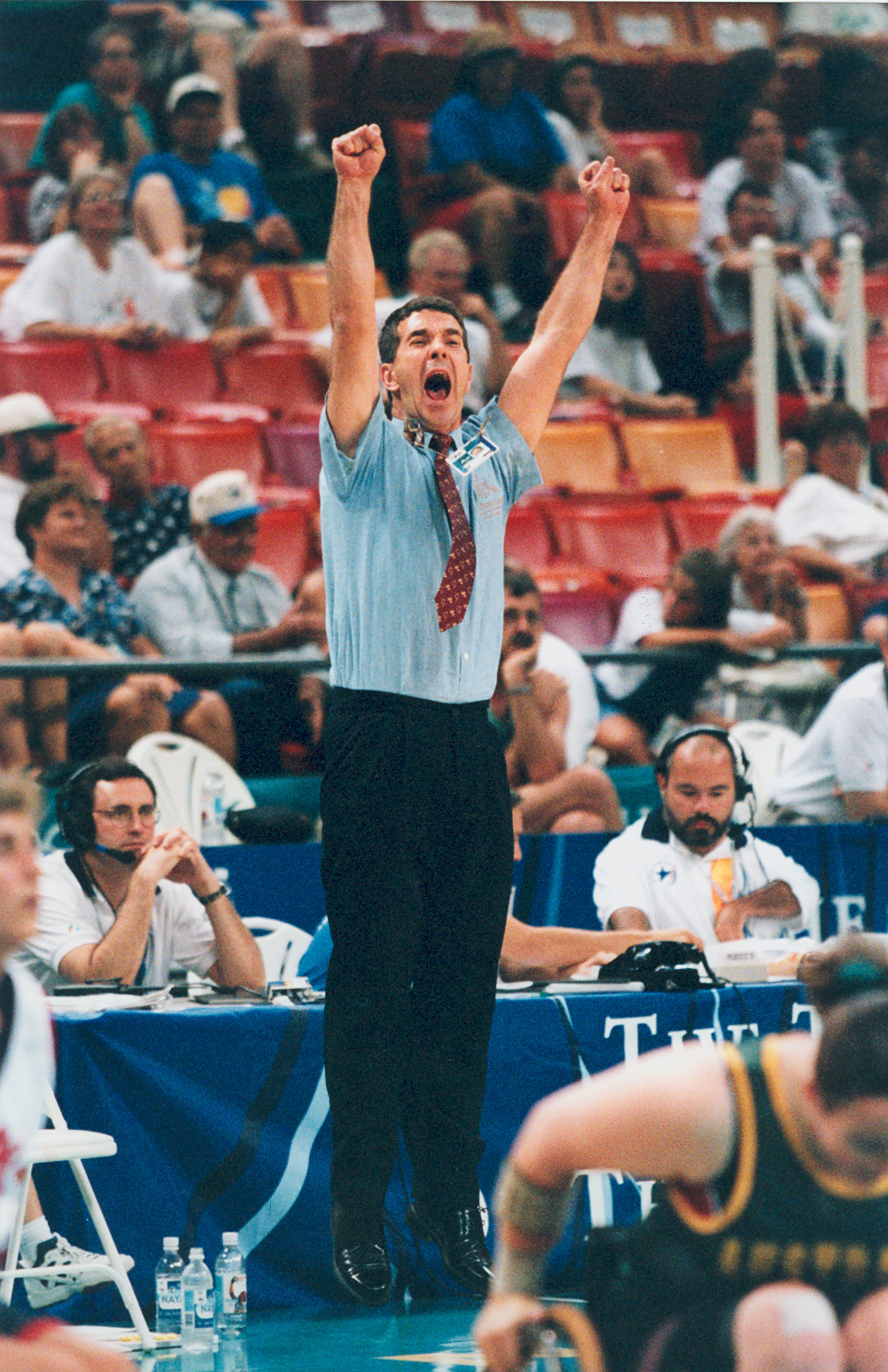
Peter Corr, Head Coach of the Australian women's wheelchair basketball team, the Gliders, celebrates at 1996 Atlanta Paralympics

Women's wheelchair basketball was first played at the 1968 Summer Paralympics in Tel Aviv, but Australia did not have a team that competed until 1992 in Barcelona.

The 1996 Summer Paralympics were the first Paralympics basketball tournament to feature the three-wheeled wheelchair. Most of the women on the Australian team opted to use the traditional four-wheeled wheelchair.

=== Competition history ===
Prior to the start of the 1996 Paralympics, Australia was ranked third in the world after their bronze medal at the 1994 Wheelchair Basketball World Championship, behind first placed Canada and United States. In lead up preparations for the games, the team toured Canada. Australia's women's team beat the American team at the Paralympics in pool play. This was viewed as extremely significant by Australian women's wheelchair basketball fans and the Australian Paralympic Federation because the game was invented in America. Also, it was the first time that the Australian women had defeated the Americans. The match had even more significance because Australia needed to win it in order to stay in contention for a medal. Australia was down 21–16 at halftime. Australia went up with seven minutes left in the second half. The match finished with a score of 31–27 in Australia's favour. American Sharon Herbst was their team's start performer and she caused a number of problems for Australia's defence. During the game, several players were knocked out of their wheelchairs, including Australia's Melissa Ferrett. The Americans challenged the win, protesting because they believed the Australians were not wearing matching uniforms. Australia beat Brazil 67–8, beat the USA 31–27 and lost to Germany 34–26 in pool play. They lost to Canada in the semi-finals, going down 31–36. They played the Americans in the bronze medal match, losing 30–41. The team's top scorer in the competition was Liesl Tesch.

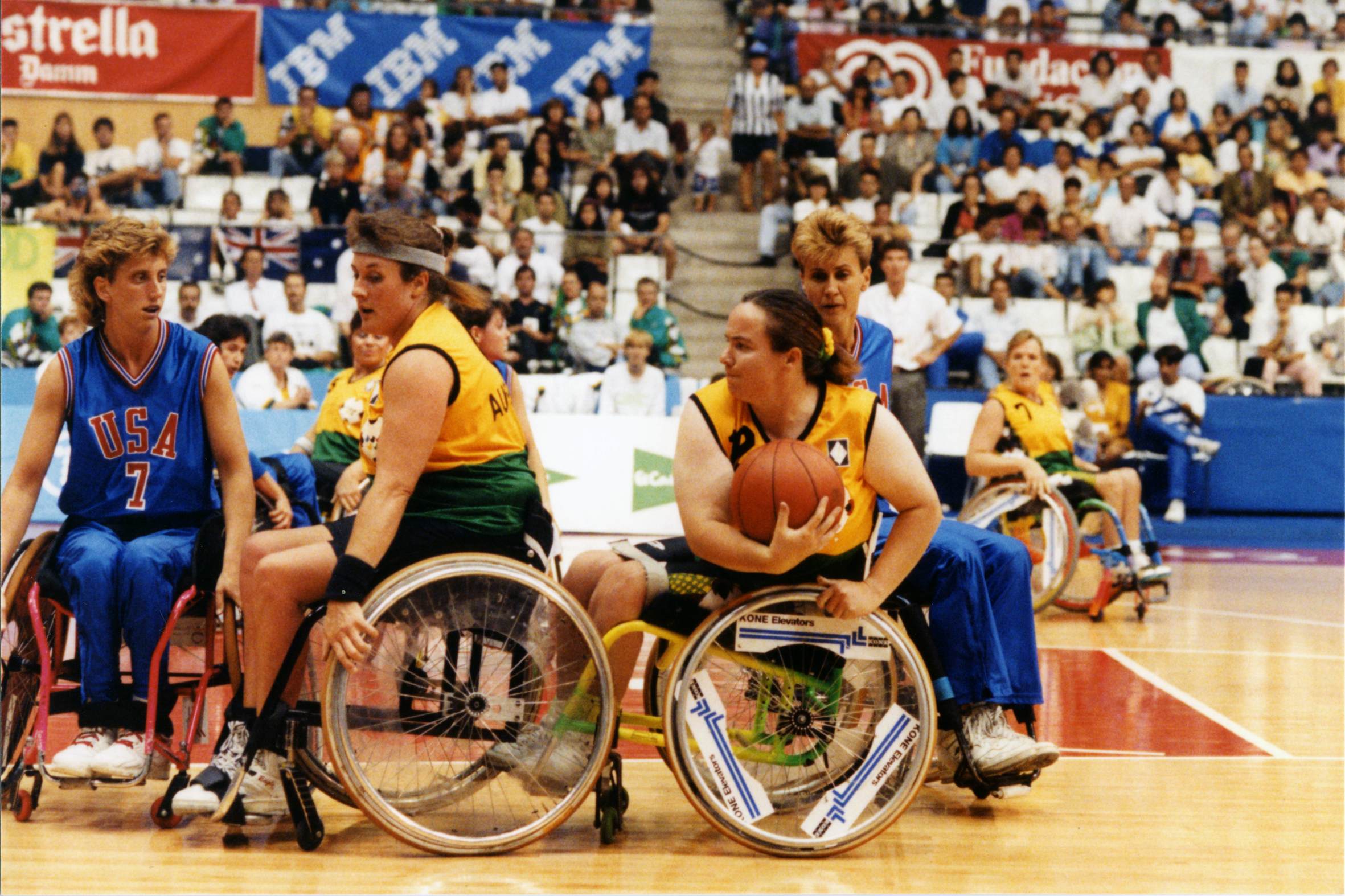
Gliders playing the United States at the 1992 Barcelona Paralympics

In 1998, the team again won a bronze medal at the World Championships. In April and May 1999, the team was invited by the Kinki Wheelchair Basketball Association and the Japanese Wheelchair Basketball Federation to compete in a tournament in Japan to celebrate twenty-five years of wheelchair basketball in that country. The Australian team won every game they competed in, including three test matches against the Japanese team. The last test was played before Japan's royalty, and Australia won 61–25. The team had an official team dinner with Emperor Akihito of Japan during this tour.

The team won silver medals at the 2000 Summer Paralympics in Sydney and the 2004 Summer Paralympics in Athens, with a bronze medal at the 2002 World Championships. Prior to the start of the 2008 Paralympics, the team was ranked fourth in the world. They received this rank by beating Japan and New Zealand in the qualifying tournament for the games.

In 2008, the team competed in the Osaka Cup. They earned a silver medal, only losing to the United States in the final. The Gliders lost to the United States 20–52. After the Osaka Cup, the team competed in the Goodluck Beijing Test Event, where they won three matches and lost one against China. The team then competed in the Joseph F. Lyttle World Basketball Challenge, where they finished third. They then went to the United States and competed in the North America Cup, where they finished fourth. The team then went back to China where they played five matches against China, where they went undefeated.

The Australia women's national wheelchair basketball team at the 2012 Summer Paralympics consisted of twelve included nine veterans with 15 Paralympic Games between them: Bridie Kean, Amanda Carter, Sarah Stewart, Tina McKenzie, Kylie Gauci, Katie Hill, Cobi Crispin, Clare Nott and Shelley Chaplin; and three newcomers: Amber Merritt, Sarah Vinci and Leanne Del Toso. The Gliders, who had won silver in the 2000 Summer Paralympics in Sydney and the 2004 Summer Paralympics in Athens, but had never won gold, finished at the top of their pool in the group stage of the competition with victories over Brazil, Great Britain and the Netherlands. They then went on to win in the quarter-final against Mexico and the semi-final against the United States, only to lose to Germany in the final.

== Major tournament record ==
=== Performance in Paralympic Games ===
- 1992 – 4th
- 1996 – 4th
- 2000 – Silver
- 2004 – Silver
- 2008 – Bronze
- 2012 – Silver
- 2016 – did not qualify
- 2020 – 9th
- 2024 – did not qualify
- 2028 –

=== Performance in Gold Cup / World Championships ===
- 1990 - 6th
- 1994 – Bronze
- 1998 – Bronze
- 2002 – Bronze
- 2006 – 4th
- 2010 – 4th
- 2014 – 6th
- 2018 – 9th
- 2022 – 6th
- 2026 – 10th

== Past Paralympic Games rosters ==
=== 1992 Paralympic Games ===
- Team Members – Amanda Carter, Coralie Churchett, Sue Hobbs, Paula Coghlan, Lisa O'Nion, Donna Ritchie, Amanda Rose, Julie Russell, Sharon Slann, Liesl Tesch; Coach – Peter Corr Official – John Crossley (escort).

=== 1996 Paralympic Games ===
- Team Members – Julianne Adams, Amanda Carter (2.0), Paula Ewin (4.5), Melissa Ferrett (1.0), Alison Mosely (4.5), Lisa O'Nion (3.0), Donna Philp (4.0), Donna Ritchie (1.5), Amanda Rose (2.5), Sharon Slann (3.0), Liesl Tesch (4.5), Jane Webb (3.0); Coaches – Peter Corr (head coach), Tracy York; Officials – Shona Casey .

=== 2000 Paralympic Games ===
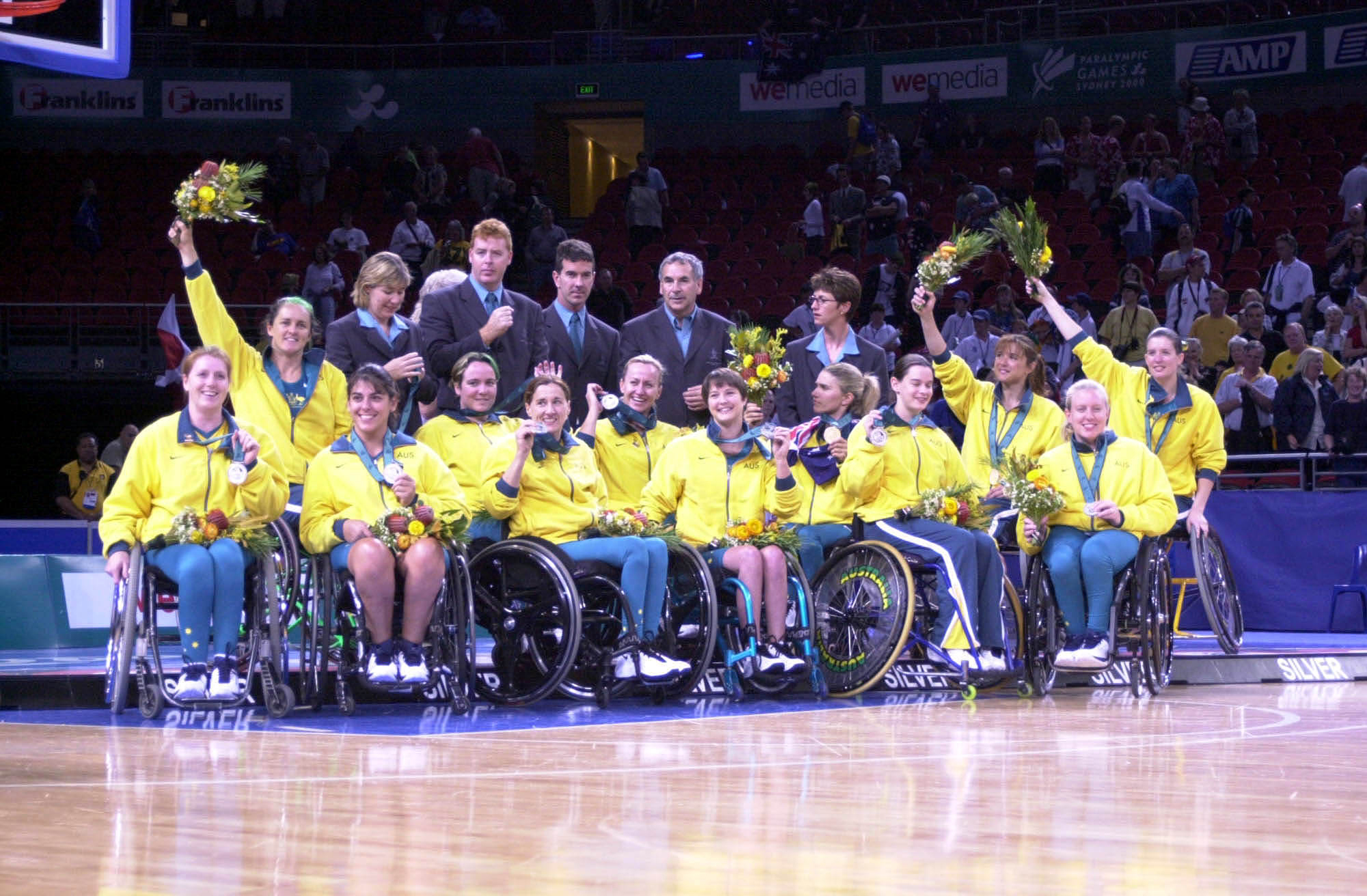
Australian Women's Basketball Silver Medal Presentation at the 2000 Sydney Paralympics

- Team Members – Julianne Adams (2.0), Amanda Carter (2.0), Paula Coghlan (4.5), Mellissa Dunn (4.5), Karen Farrell (1.0), Alison Mosely (4.5), Lisa O'Nion (3.0), Donna Ritchie (1.5), Nadya Romeo (1.0), Sharon Slann (2.5), Liesl Tesch (4.5), Jane Webb (3.0); Coaches – Peter Corr (head coach), Tracey York, Rob Beveridge Officials – Kevin Smith (manager)

=== 2004 Paralympic Games ===
- Team Members – Lisa Chaffey (1.0), Shelley Chaplin (3.5), Paula Coghlan (4.5), Melanie Domaschenz (1.0), Karen Farrell (1.0), Kylie Gauci (2.0), Tina McKenzie (3.0), Alison Mosely (4.5), Jane Sachs (3.0), Sarah Stewart (3.0), Liesl Tesch (4.0), Melinda Young (2.5); Coaches – Gerry Hewson (head coach), Darryl Durham (assistant coach); Officials – Sonia Healy (manager), Michael Dowling.

=== 2008 Paralympic Games ===
- Team Members – Clare Burzynski (1.0), Shelley Chaplin (3.5), Cobi Crispin (4.0), Melanie Domaschenz (1.0), Kylie Gauci (2.0), Melanie Hall (2.5), Katie Hill (3.0), Bridie Kean (4.0), Tina McKenzie (3.0), Kathleen O'Kelly-Kennedy (4.0), Sarah Stewart (3.0) Liesl Tesch (4.0); Coaches – Gerry Hewson (head coach), Mark Hewish Officials – Sonia Healy (Section Manager), Emma Whiteside.

=== 2012 Paralympic Games ===
- Team Members – Amanda Carter (1.0), Shelley Chaplin (3.5), Cobi Crispin (4.0), Leanne Del Toso (3.5), Kylie Gauci (2.0), Katie Hill (3.0), Bridie Kean (4.0), Tina McKenzie (3.0), Clare Nott (1.0), Amber Merritt (4.5), Sarah Stewart (3.0), Sarah Vinci (1.0) Coaches – John Triscari (head coach), David Gould (assistant coach), Ben Osborne (assistant coach) ; Officials – Marian Stewart (section manager), Miranda Wallis (physiotherapist)

=== 2016 Paralympic Games ===
Gliders failed to qualify after finishing second to China at the 2015 Asia Oceania Zone Qualifying Tournament.

=== 2020 Paralympic Games ===
- Team Members – Natalie Alexander (2.5), Jess Cronje (4.0), Shelley Cronau (2.5), Hannah Dodd (1.0), Mary Friday (1.0), Isabel Martin (1.0), Bree Mellberg (3.0), Amber Merritt (4.5), Georgia Munro-Cook (4.5), Taishar Ovens (1.0), Ella Sabljak (1.0), Sarah Vinci (1.0); Coaches – Craig Friday (head coach), Craig Campbell (assistant), Sarah Graham (assistant) Officials - Leigh Gooding (Program Manager), Cathy Lambert (team manager), Chloe Manuel (physiotherapist)

Detailed Results – Wheelchair basketball at the 2020 Summer Paralympics

=== 2024 Paralympic Games ===
Gliders failed to qualify after losing to Japan in the quarter-finals at the IWBF Repechage in Osaka, Japan.

== Past World Championship Rosters ==
=== 1990 Gold Cup ===
- Team Members – Julianne Adams, Amanda Carter, Coralie Churchett, Paula Ewin, Susan Hobbs, Lisa O'Nion, Mandy Rose, Donna Ritchie, Sharon Slann, Liesl Tesch, Jane Webb; Coach - Peter Corr

=== 1994 Gold Cup ===
- Team Members – F. Alaouie, Amanda Carter, Lisa Chaffey, Coralie Churchett, Karen Farrell, Lisa O'Nion, Donna Ritchie, Amanda Rose, Sharon Slann, F. Stanley, Liesl Tesch, Jane Webb; Coach - Peter Corr

=== 1998Gold Cup ===
- Team Members – Julianne Adams, Amanda Carter, Paula Coghlan, Melissa Collins, Mellissa Dunn, Karen Farrell, Alison Mosley, Lisa O’Nion, Donna Ritchie, Nadiy Romeo, Liesl Tesch, Jane Webb; Coaches - Peter Corr, C. Lueg (assistant coach)

=== 2002 Gold Cup ===
- Team Members – Julianne Adams, Lisa Chaffey, Shelley Chaplin, Paula Coglan, Melissa Collins, Karen Farrell, Kylie Gauci, Tina McKenzie, Alison Mosely, Lisa 'O'Nion, Jane Sachs, Liesl Tesch; Coaches - Elizabeth Fraser (head coach), Darryl Durham (assistant coach), Gerry Hewson (assistant coach)

=== 2006 Gold Cup ===
- Team Members – Clare Burzynski (1.0),Shelley Chaplin (3.5), Melanie Domaschenz (1.0), Kylie Gauci (2.0), Melanie Hall (2.5), Tina McKenzie (3.0), Alison Mosely (4.5), Kathleen O'Kelly-Kennedy (4.0), Jenny Nicholls (4.5), Sarah Stewart (3.0), Leisl Tesch (4.0), Coaches - Gerry Hewson (head coach),Matt Dunstan (assistant coach) ; Officials – Sonia Healy (Assistant coach/manager), David Spurrier (physiotherapist)

=== 2010 World Championships ===
- Team Members – Melanie Domaschenz (1.0), Cobi Crispin (4.0), Bridie Kean (4.0), Amber Merritt (4.5), Tina McKenzie (c) (3.0), Leisl Tesch (4.0), Clare Burzynski (1.0), Kylie Gauci (2.0), Sarah Stewart (3.0), Katie Hill (3.0), Leanne Del Toso (4.0), Shelley Chaplin (3.5); Coaches – John Triscari (head coach), Ben Osborne (assistant coach), Matt Dunstan (assistant coach); Officials – Marian Stewart (manager), Miranda Wallis (physiotherapist)

=== 2014 World Championships ===
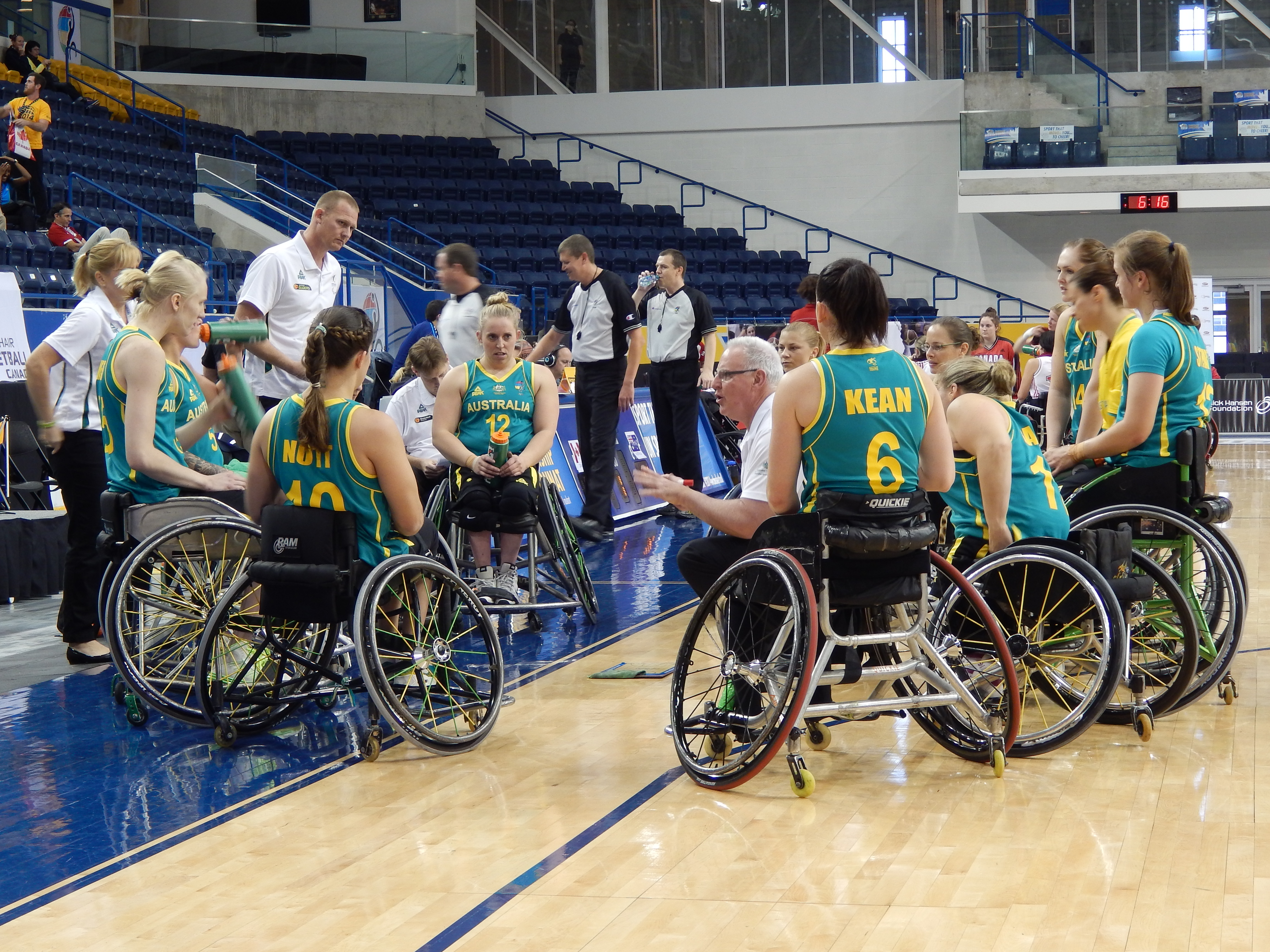
Australian Gliders at the 2014 Women's World Wheelchair Basketball Championship in Toronto

- Team Members – Shelley Chaplin (3.5), Cobi Crispin (4.0), Shelley Cronau (3.0), Leanne Del Toso (3.5), Kylie Gauci (2.0), Bridie Kean (4.0), Amber Merritt(4.5), Clare Nott (1.0), Kathleen O'Kelly-Kennedy (4.0), Sarah Stewart (3.0), Stephanie van Leeuwen (1.0), Sarah Vinci (1.0); Coaches – Tom Kyle (head coach), David Gould (assistant coach), Troy Sachs (assistant coach) ; Officials – Jane Kyle (manager), -

=== 2018 World Championships ===
- Team Members - Shelley Chaplin (3.5), Cobi Crispin, Shelley Cronau (3.0), Hannah Dodd (1.0), Leanne Del Toso (3.5), Kylie Gauci (2.0), Annabelle Lindsay(4.5), Georgia Munro-Cook (4.5), Clare Nott (1.0), Amber Merritt(4.5), Ella Sabljak, Sarah Vinci (1.0); Coaches David Gould (head coach), Stephen Charlton (assistant coach), Craig Campbell (Assistant/Technical Coach); Officials - Anna de Araugo (physiotherapist), Peta Forsyth (Physiologist), Cathy Lambert (team manager)

=== 2022 World Championships ===
- Team Members - Lucinda Bueti (4.0), Jess Cronje (4.0), Laura Davoli (4.0), Hannah Dodd (1.0), Annabelle Dennis (4.5), Breanna Fisk (1.0), Georgia Inglis (2.5), Maryanne Latu (2.5), Isabel Martin (1.0), Amber Merritt(4.5) Georgia Munro-Cook (4.5), Sarah Vinci (1.0); Coaches Craig Campbell (head coach), Tina McKenzie (head assistant coach), Lauren Robinson (assistant coach), Warren Brown (technical assistant)

=== 2026 World Championships ===
- Team Members - Lucinda Bueti (4.0), Laura Davoli (4.0), Hannah Dodd (1.0), Katelin Gunn (1.5), Sara Houston (4.0), Maryanne Latu (2.5), Isabel Martin (1.0),

Shelley Matheson (3.0), Georgia Munro-Cook (4.5), Taishar Ovens (1.0), Ebony Stevenson (3.0), Sarah Vinci (1.0); Coaches Jeremey Synot (head coach), Matthew McShane (assistant coach), Kelsey Griffin (assistant coach)

== See also ==
- Australia at the Paralympics
- Disabled sports
- Wheelchair basketball

== Bibliography ==
- Australian Paralympic Committee (September 1999). "Basketball – Wheelchair Women". Annual Report – 1999. Sydney, Australia: Australian Paralympic Committee.
- Australian Paralympic Committee (2008). "Basketball (Wheelchair)". Media Guide Beijing 2008. Sydney, New South Wales: Australian Paralympic Committee.
- Australian Paralympic Federation (November 1992). "History in Madrid". LINK. Sydney, New South Wales: Australian Paralympic Federation.
- Overington, Caroline (1996a). "Basketballers beat the US at their own game". Golden Days of Atlanta: Xth Paralympic Games Atlanta, Georgia, August 15–25, 1996. Sydney: Australian Paralympic Federation: 21–23. OCLC 222120061.
- Webster, Jim (1996). "Success for superteam". Golden Days of Atlanta: Xth Paralympic Games Atlanta, Georgia, August 15–25, 1996. Sydney: Australian Paralympic Federation: 6–8. OCLC 222120061.
