= Julianne Adams =

Australian wheelchair basketball player

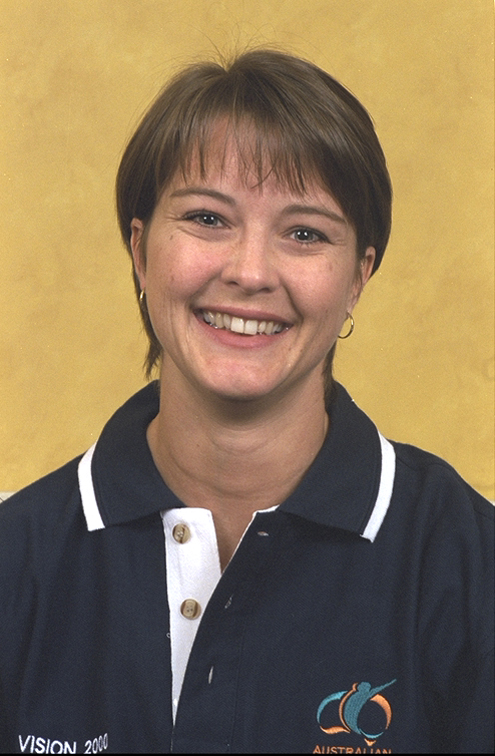
- 2000 Australian Paralympic team portrait of Adams

Personal information
- Nationality: Australia
- Born: 11 July 1966 (age 59)
Medal record
Wheelchair basketball
Paralympic Games
Silver medal – second place	2000 Sydney	Women's wheelchair basketball

Julianne Adams (born 11 July 1966) is an Australian wheelchair basketball player.

== Personal ==
Adams was born in Perth on 11 July 1966. As a child, Adams thought that she could perhaps be an Olympic gymnast. From the age of five to seventeen, Adams was involved with competitive gymnastics. During this period, she would often train for over thirty hours a week. While attending university, she worked in gymnastics as a designer of routines for other gymnasts, which could be video taped and compared against national standards. It was while practising routines she had done before that she injured herself falling on her neck, and severed her spinal cord after landing on her back. While she was in the hospital following her accident, she was approached by a wheelchair basketball player. The sport administrator knew of her background in competitive athletics and recruited her to play wheelchair basketball. She was not initially interested in participating in the sport, but her physiotherapy program required her to play. After playing the sport for the first time, she fell in love with it and decided to pursue it on a more competitive level.

== Competitive career ==
=== Wheelchair basketball national team ===
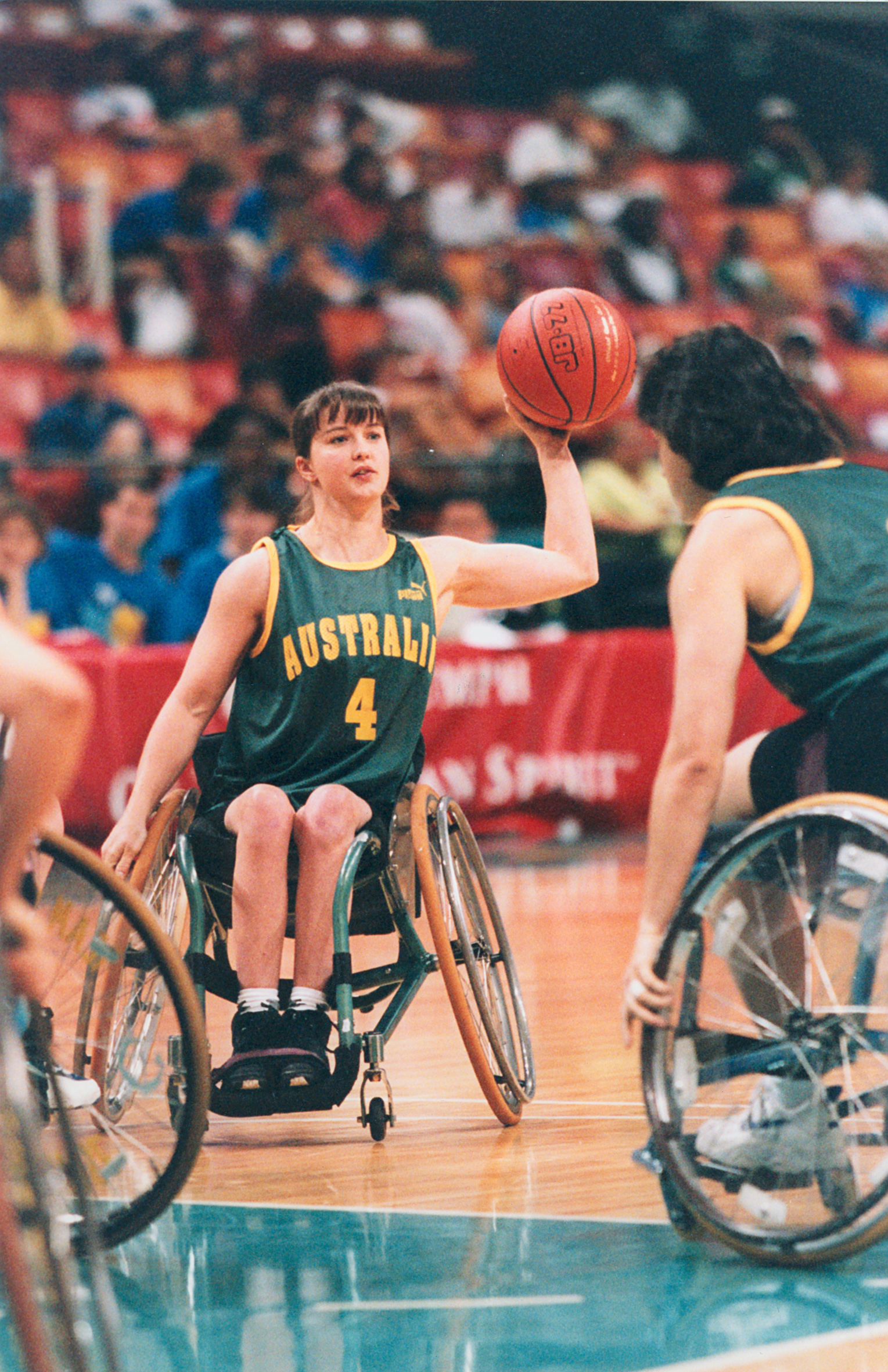
Adams passing the ball at the 1996 Atlanta Paralympics

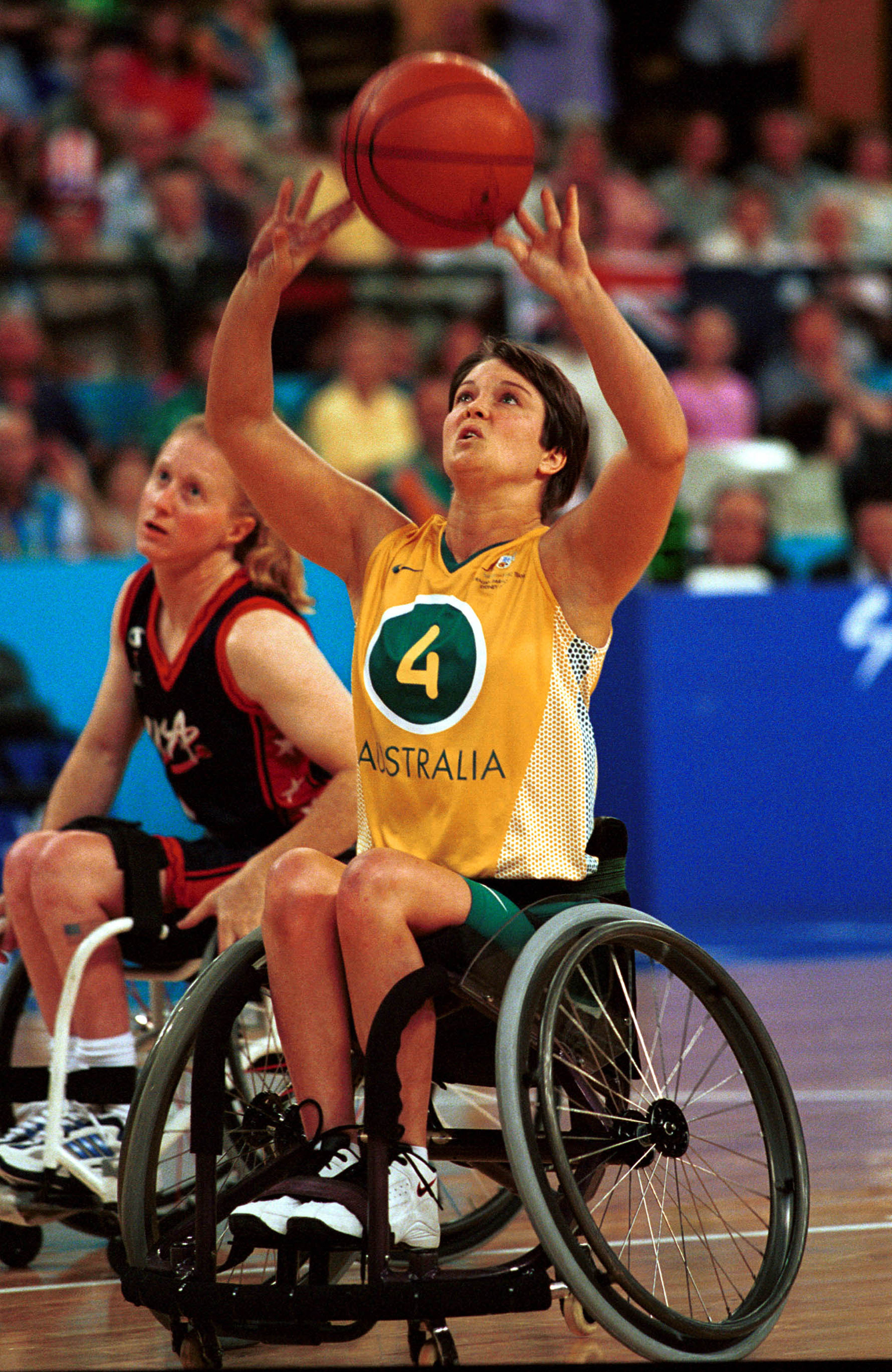
Adams shoots the ball during competition at the 2000 Sydney Paralympics

Adams competed in the Australian women's national wheelchair basketball team's first international tournament, which took place in Saint-Étienne, France in 1990, and Australia finished in sixth place. She participated in the training camp for the women's team in preparation for the 1992 Barcelona Paralympics but did not make the final selection. This disillusioned her and she did not compete in the sport for several years. She was selected for the 1996 Atlanta Games squad and moved from Western Australia to Melbourne to be on the national team. Between 1996 and 2000, the government increased funding for Australian Paralympic athletes. Before this period, Adams and other Paralympians were largely paying their own way to compete, such as the case with Adams paying her own way to compete in France. Getting compensation from government funding of sport organisations meant that she could spend more time working on improving her sporting performance. In the eight months before the 2000 Summer Paralympics, she could be an athlete full-time. She was part of the national squad that beat Canada in a June 2000 tournament. The victory against the Canadians was the first time Canada had lost a game in a tournament in ten years. She was part of the silver medal-winning Australia women's national wheelchair basketball team at the 2000 Summer Paralympics.

=== Women’s National Wheelchair Basketball League ===
She was named as one of the Women's National Wheelchair Basketball League's All Star Five in 2001, 2002 and 2003 as a member of the Victorian Wheelies. In 2008, she was competing for the Western Stars.

== Recognition ==
In 2000, she was given a special medallion by Victoria's Premier Steve Bracks and Community Services Minister Christine Campbell in recognition for her performance at the 2000 Paralympics. She appeared in the 2000 documentary Screamin' wheelies.
