= Jane Sachs =

Australian wheelchair basketball player (born 1972)

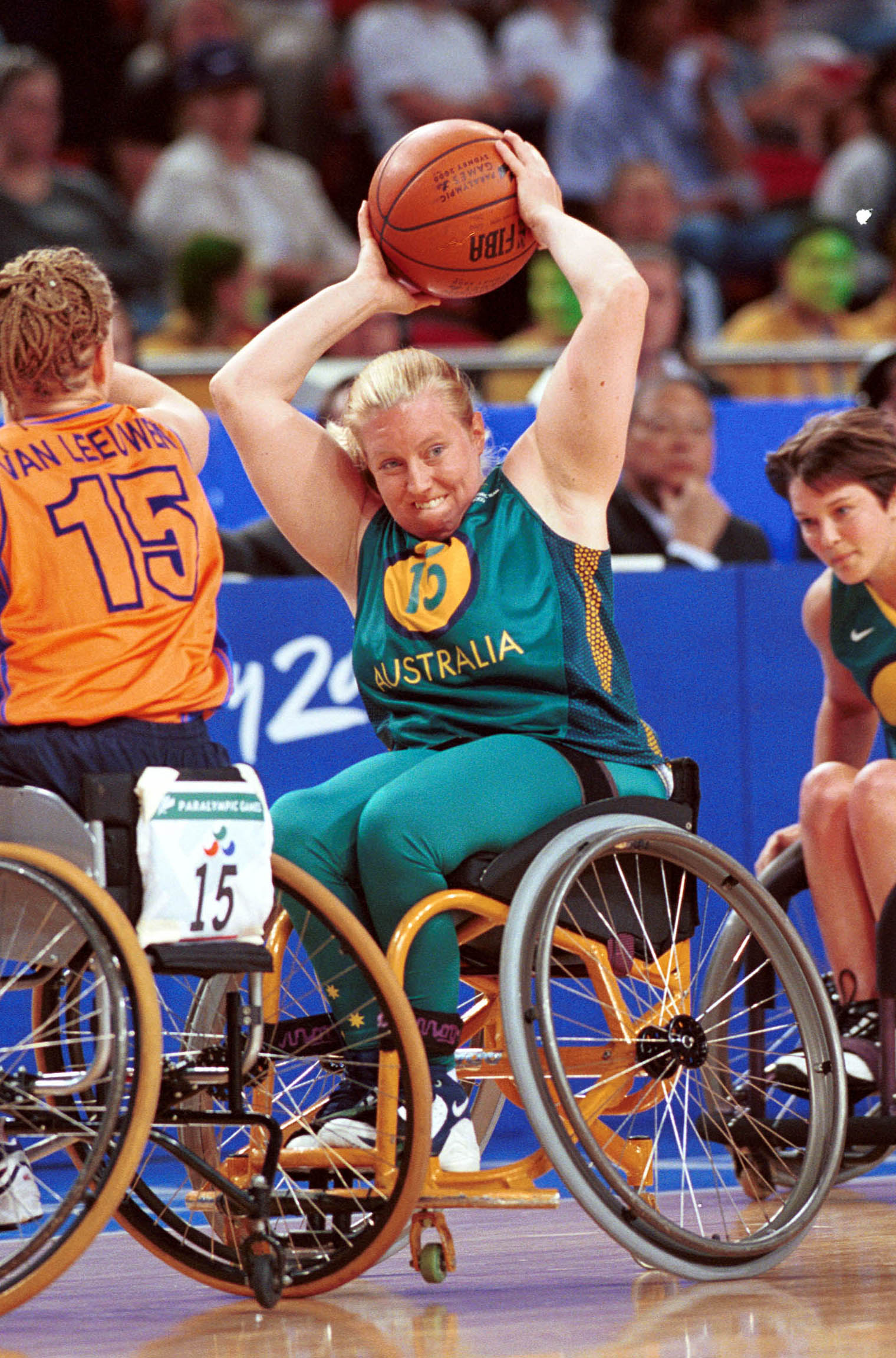
- Sachs with the ball during a match at the 2000 Sydney Paralympics

Personal information
- Nationality: Australian
- Born: 19 June 1972 (age 54) Hobart, Tasmania, Australia
Medal record
Women's wheelchair basketball
Representing Australia
Paralympic Games
Silver medal – second place	2000 Sydney	Team
Silver medal – second place	2004 Athens	Team

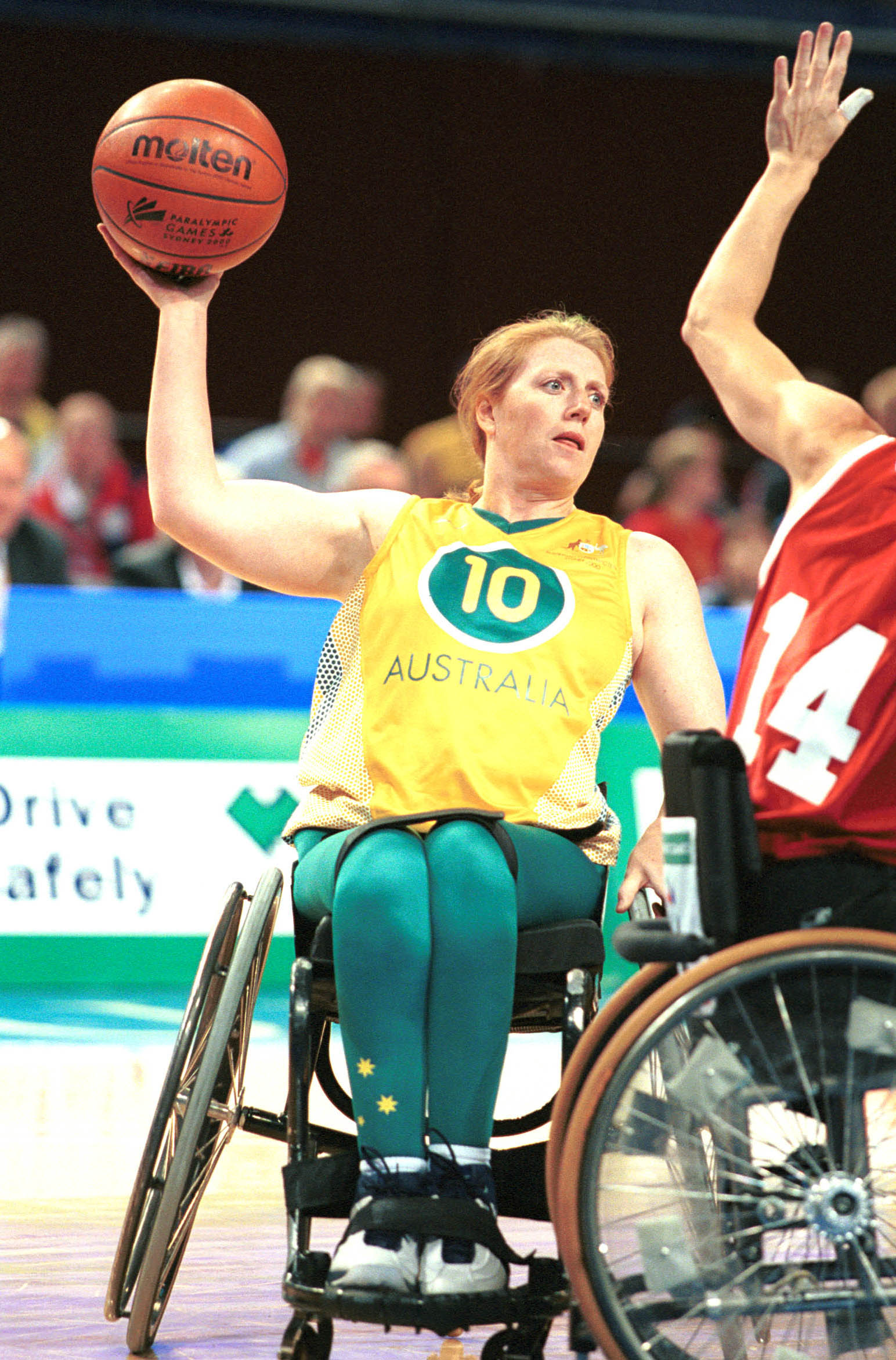
Sachs passes the ball during competition at the 2000 Sydney Paralympics

Jane Sachs (née Webb, born 19 June 1972) is an Australian wheelchair basketball player, who has won two medals at three Paralympics from 1996 to 2004.

== Personal ==
Sachs was born in Hobart on 19 June 1972. She competed in running and played netball before an accident at the age of nine, when she fell from a tree and landed on an exposed tree root, breaking her back. She works as a consultant for Westpac and lives in Sydney. She was married to wheelchair basketballer Troy Sachs and the couple had a daughter.

== Career ==
Sachs, a 3 point player, first represented Australia in the national wheelchair basketball squad at the 1989 FESPIC Games. She competed in the 1990 and 1994 Gold Cups, receiving a bronze medal in the latter event, and the 1994 FESPIC Games. Her first Paralympics was the 1996 Atlanta Games, where her team came fourth, and she won a bronze medal with her team at the 1998 Gold Cup. She won silver medals with her team at the 2000 Sydney and 2004 Athens Paralympics. She has played for the West Sydney Razorbacks and, most recently, the Stacks Goudkamp Bears (previously the North Sydney Bears).
