= Annabelle Dennis =

Australian wheelchair basketball player

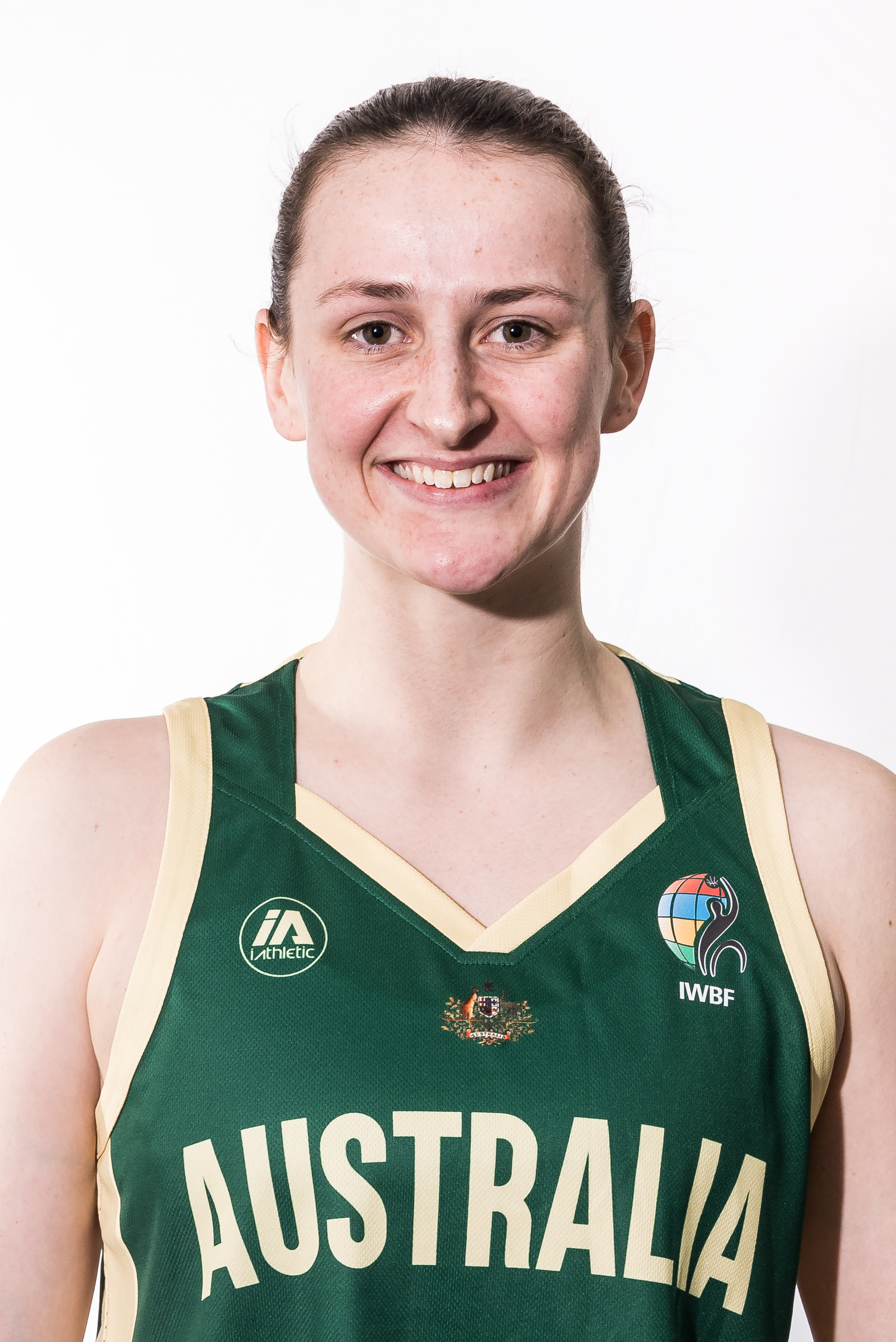
- Annabelle Dennis in 2023

Personal information
- Born: 19 January 1999 (age 27)

Sport
- Country: Australia
- Sport: Wheelchair basketball
- Disability class: 4.5
- Event: Women's team

Annabelle Dennis (born 19 January 1999) is a 4.5 point Australian wheelchair basketball player. She made her international debut with the Australian women's national wheelchair basketball team (the Gliders) at the 2022 IWBF Asia Oceania Championships in Phuket in May 2022. In June 2023, she represented Australia at the 2022 Wheelchair Basketball World Championships in Dubai. In October 2023 she will captain the Australian Under 25 wheelchair basketball team (the Devils) at the 2023 IWBF U25 Women's Wheelchair Basketball World Championships being held in Bangkok.

== Biography ==
Annabelle Dennis was born on 19 January 1999. She attended Westminster School in Adelaide, from which she graduated in 2016. When she was 13, an accident while kneeboarding left her with complex regional pain syndrome. In 2021, she took up wheelchair basketball. She is a 4.5 point player.

In May 2022, she was selected to play with the Australian women's national wheelchair basketball team (the Gliders) in the 2022 Asia Oceania Championships. In June 2023, she was a member of the Gliders team at the 2022 Wheelchair Basketball World Championships in Dubai.
