= Penola Catholic College =

Catholic School in Australia

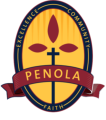
- Australia

Information
- Type: Private, co-ed, Catholic school, day school
- Established: 1995
- Principal: Ms Tracey Kift
- Campuses: Broadmeadows (Senior/Main campus) and Glenroy (Junior Campus)
- Colours: Maroon, gold & blue
- Website: www.penola.vic.edu.au

Penola Catholic College (also known as PCC or simply Penola) is a co-educational secondary college, located in Melbourne, Victoria, Australia. The Patron of the college is Saint Mary MacKillop. It has two campuses: one located at Glenroy, which is commonly known as the junior campus for Years 7 and 8 students; and the other, the main campus, in Broadmeadows for the Years 9 to 12 students. Penola Catholic College is the result of the amalgamation in 1995 of three Catholic secondary schools – Therry College, Geoghegan College and Sancta Sophia College. The site of Therry and Geoghegan Collegesis nows the home to Penola's Senior Campus (Years 9–12), which is located on Gibson Street, Broadmeadows. The Junior Campus of Penola (Year 7–8) is located on the original site of Sancta Sophia College in Glenroy.

The college is a member of the Sports Association of Catholic Co-educational Secondary Schools (SACCSS).

== Houses ==
The college operates a house group system. Students are divided into six house groups for the duration of their enrolment at the college. Students compete for house points in activities such as sport, debating and other extracurricular activities.

The six house groups are:

- Mackillop: Named after Mary MacKillop, the college's patron and is represented by the colour orange.
- Nolan: Named after Sister Livinus Nolan, long-serving Victorian Catholic school educator and member of the Sisters of St Joseph. Nolan is represented by the colour purple.
- Geoghegan: Named after one of three colleges amalgamated to form the college, and is represented by the colour green.
- Smyth: Named after Thomas Smyth, founding Principal of Penola Catholic College and is represented by the colour blue.
- Therry: Named after one of three colleges amalgamated to form the college and is represented by the colour gold.
- Sancta Sophia: Named after one of three colleges amalgamated to form the college and is represented by the colour red.

== History ==
Penola Catholic College is site of St Joseph's Foundling Hospital and a nursery taking in mothers without a family and providing hospitality.

- The college was established in 1995 but the foundations go much deeper.'

The school was formed as the result of an amalgamation of three former schools which were conducted on the sites of our two campuses, Sancta Sophia College (1967) at thr Junior campus, and Therry (1969) and Geoghegan Colleges (1973) at the Senior campus.

The College name, Penola Catholic College, was chosen because of the strong link of our Senior campus with Saint Mary MacKillop and the Sisters of St Joseph who established a foundling home on this site in 1901.

Penola, a small town in the south-east of South Australia, is where Mary MacKillop opened her first school in 1866 and where, together with Fr Julian Tenison Woods, she founded the order of the Sisters of St Joseph of the Sacred Heart.

- The Sisters of St Joseph ministered to the local community and lived on this site from 1901 until the late 1980’s.

== School Productions ==
School productions are an established part of the college community and are regularly staged for students and audiences.

- 2024: The Addams Family, School edditon. 25th-27th of July.
- 2025: Beauty and The Beast, Broadway Musical 31.
- 2026: Mamma Mia! 28th-30th May.

== Notable alumni ==
- David Rodan
- Adrian Zahra
- Jeremy Synot
- Ezi Magbegor
- The Janoskians
