= Sharon Slann =

Australian wheelchair basketball player (born 1966)

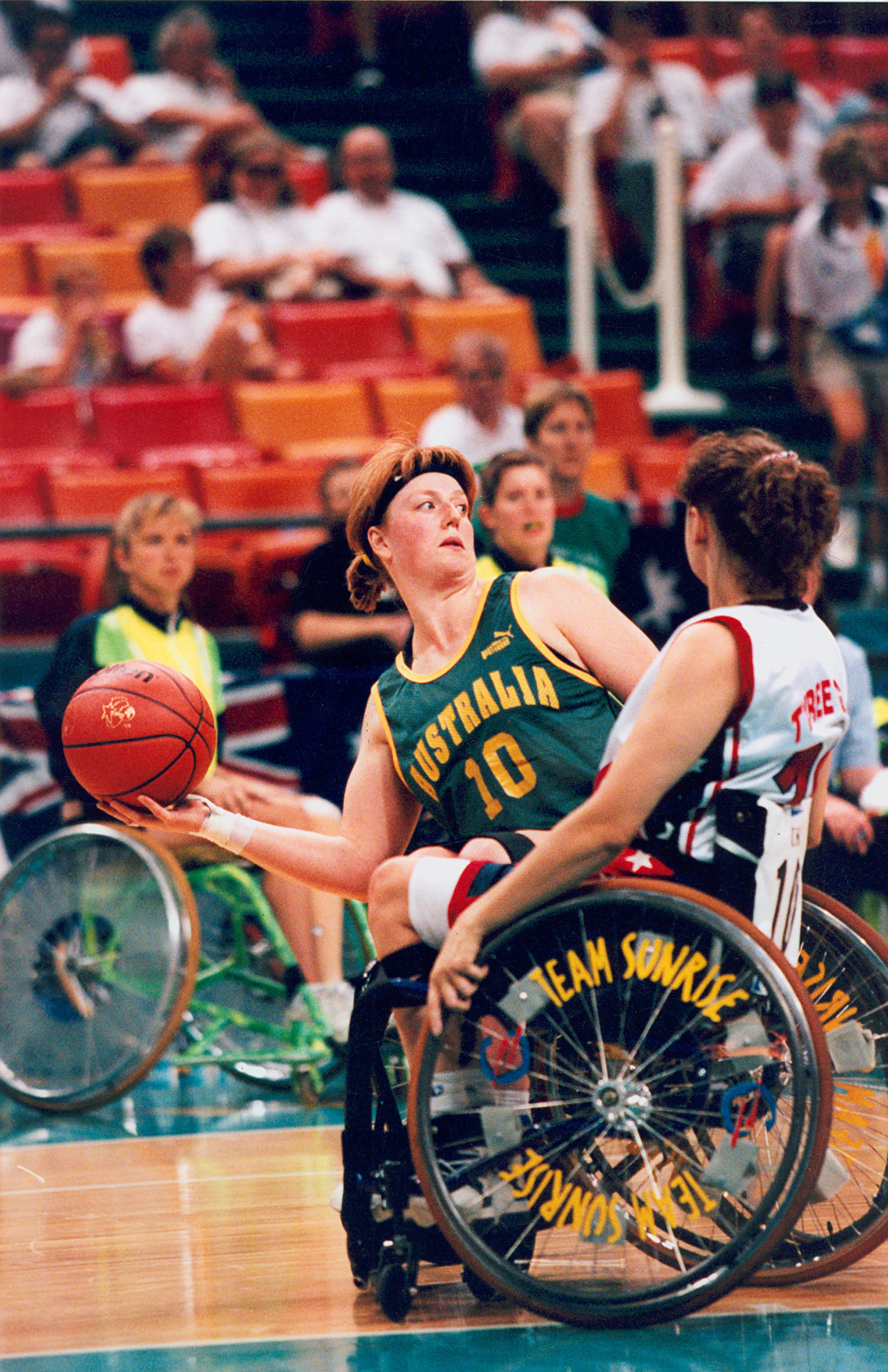

Personal information
- Nickname: shaz
- Nationality: Australia
- Born: 16 February 1966 (age 60) Clare, South Australia
- Height: 175 cm (5 ft 9 in)
Medal record
Wheelchair basketball
Paralympic Games
Silver medal – second place	2000 Sydney	Women's wheelchair basketball

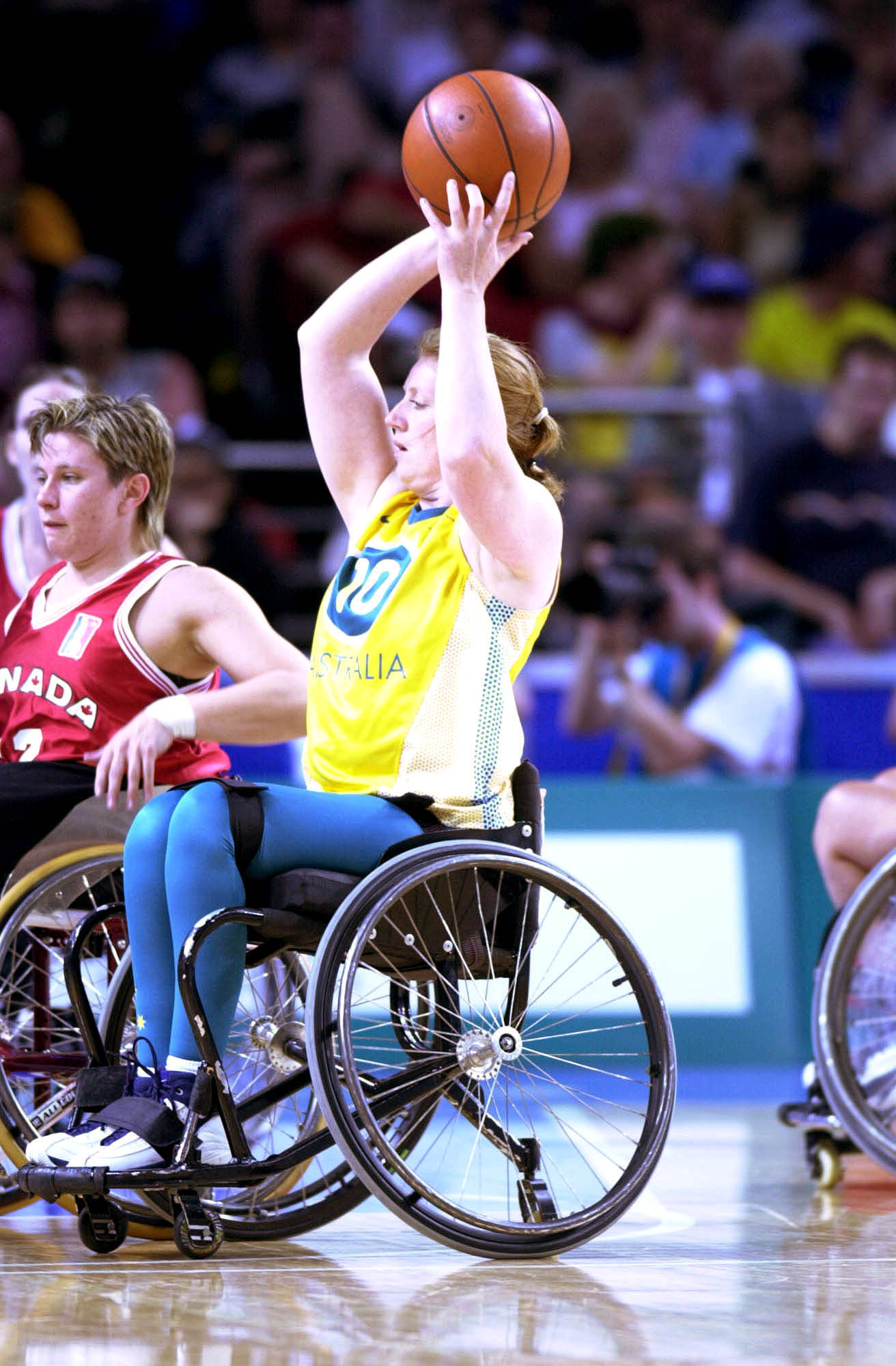
Slann with the ball during 2000 Sydney Paralympic Games match

Sharon Slann (born 12 February 1966 in Clare, South Australia) is a wheelchair basketball player from Australia. She was part of the silver medal-winning Australia women's national wheelchair basketball team at the 2000 Summer Paralympics. She was a member of the Australia team at the 1992 Barcelona Games and 1996 Athens Games. Her classification was 3.0 points at Atlanta and 2.5 points at Sydney Games.
