= Lisa Chaffey =

Australian wheelchair basketball player

Personal information
- Nationality: Australia
- Born: 16 January 1971 (age 55) Geelong, Victoria
Medal record
Wheelchair basketball
Paralympic Games
Silver medal – second place	2004 Athens	Women's wheelchair basketball

Lisa Chaffey (born 16 January 1971) is an Australian wheelchair basketball player. She was born in Geelong, Victoria. She was part of the silver medal-winning Australia women's national wheelchair basketball team at the 2004 Summer Paralympics.

Caffey is a qualified occupational therapist with a BOccTher(Hons) and a Doctor of Clinical Science ClinScD. Her academic profile is on Research Gate https://www.researchgate.net/profile/Lisa-Chaffey She is the founder of Equipped for Action (occupational therapy for sport and recreation). http://www.lisachaffey.com.au/
