= Paula Coghlan =

Australian wheelchair basketball player

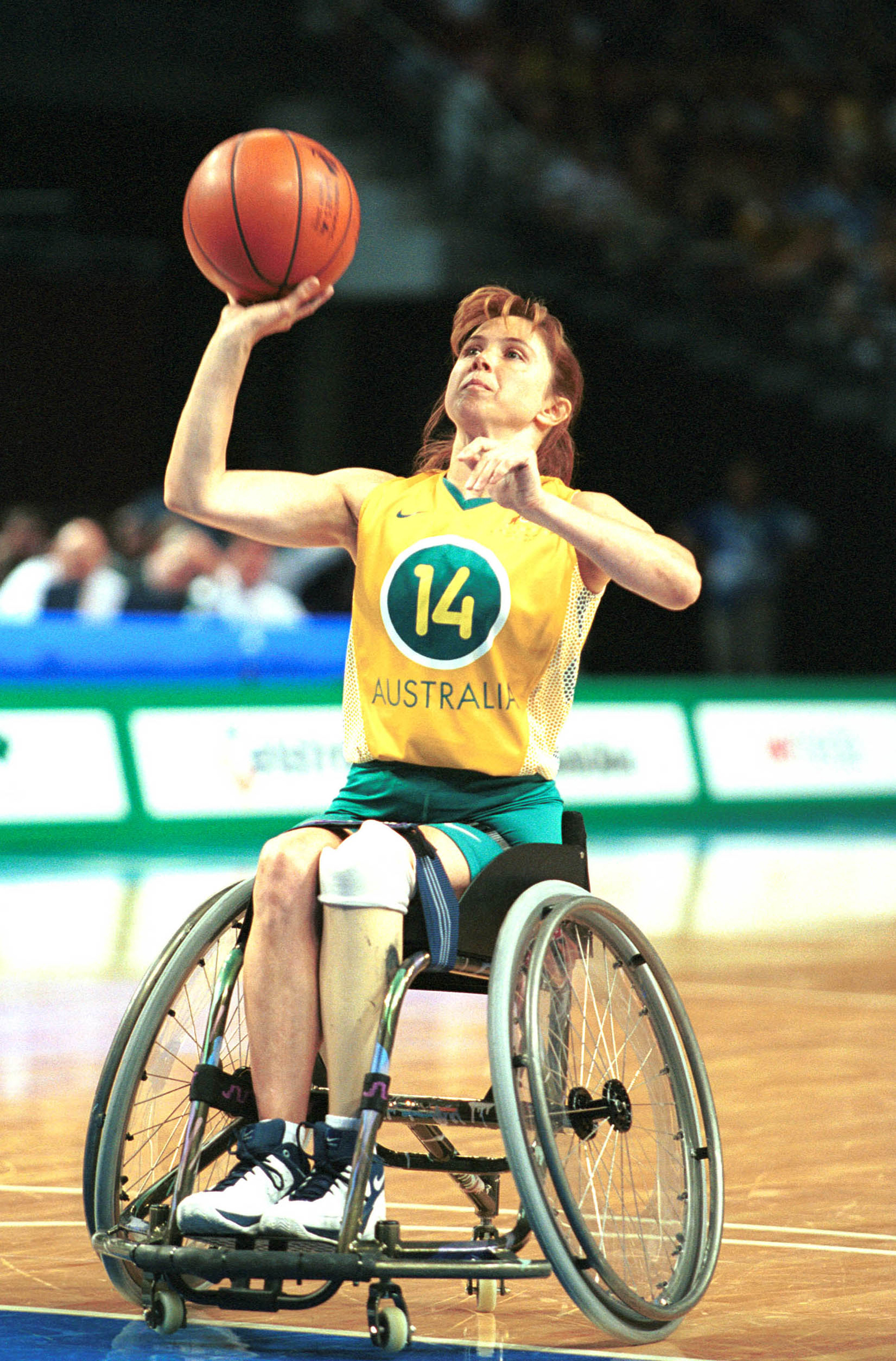
- Coghlan aims her shot during competition at the 2000 Sydney Paralympics

Personal information
- Nationality: Australia
- Born: 14 October 1965 (age 61) Box Hill, Victoria
Medal record
Women's wheelchair basketball
Representing Australia
Paralympic Games
Silver medal – second place	2000 Sydney	Team
Silver medal – second place	2004 Athens	Team

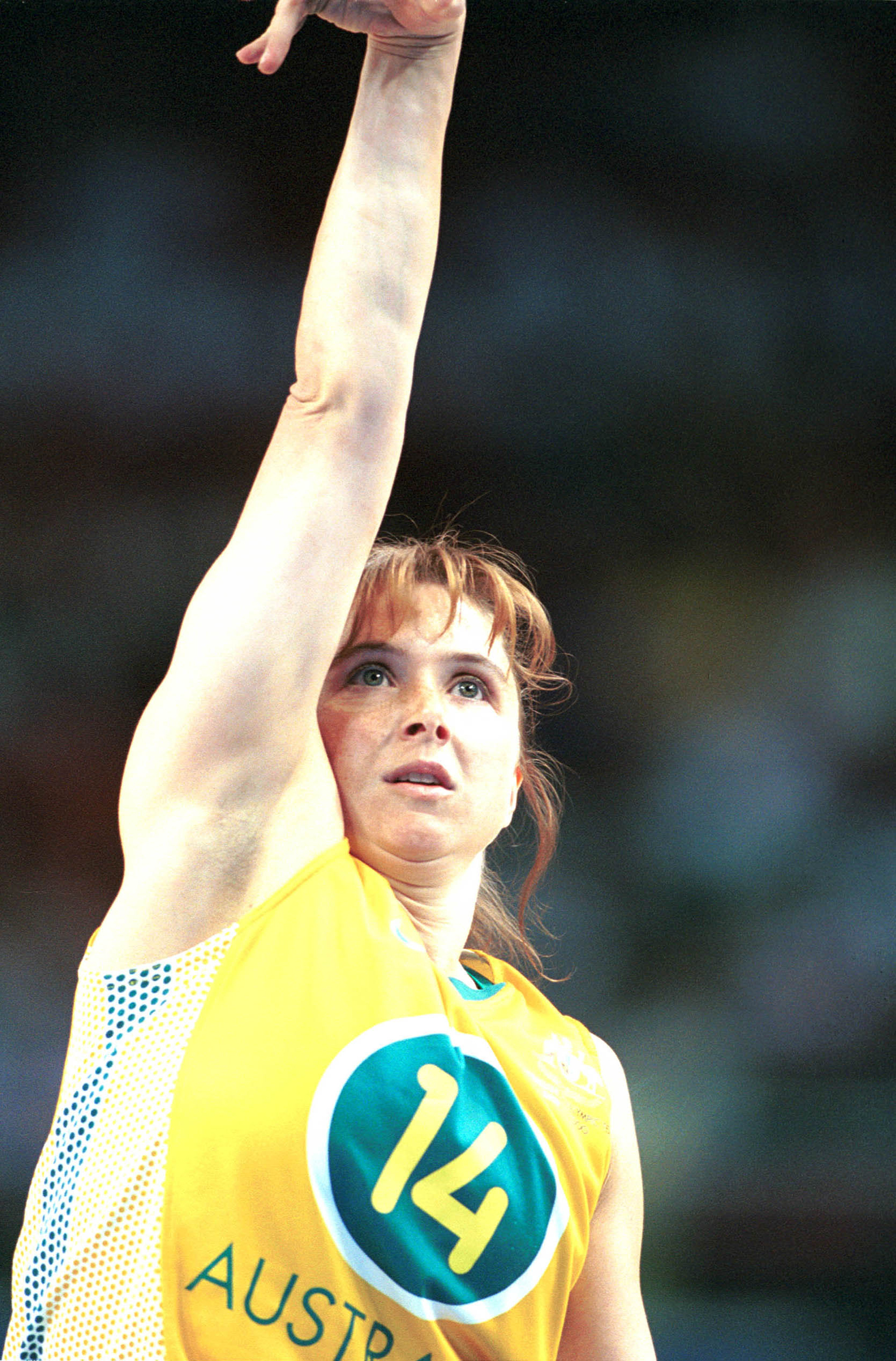
Coghlan shoots the ball during a match at the 2000 Sydney Paralympics

Paula Coghlan (born 14 October 1965) is an Australian wheelchair basketball player. She was born in the Melbourne suburb of Box Hill in Victoria.

Coghlan was part of the Australia women's national wheelchair basketball team (Gliders) at four Paralympics: the 1992 Barcelona, 1996 Atlanta, 2000 Sydney, and 2004 Athens games. She was a member of the Gliders team that won silver medals in 2000 and 2004.

Coghlan competed as Paula Lohman at the 1992 Games and at the 1996 Games she competed as Paula Ewen. She has two sons, James and Jacob. She was the domestic partner of wheelchair basketballer Sandy Blythe for eight years until his suicide in 2005. After his death, she took up a directorship for the Blythe-Sanderson Group.

In 1987, Coghlan was a passenger in a car accident where the driver dozed off behind the wheel. The car was flipped onto its roof, and her foot got trapped outside the car. After an attempt to try and rebuild most of her leg through plastic surgery, Coghlan eventually made the decision to amputate below her knee.

A wheelchair rugby player named John Kinnery, who was a quadriplegic, encouraged Coghlan to play wheelchair basketball even though she did not use a wheelchair. Coghlan did not want to participate in a sport that required her to get into a wheelchair. But after attending a wheelchair basketball game and jumping in to have a go, she fell in love with it. Coghlan said 'I just fell in love with it and never looked back. I never stopped playing from that... I was hooked'. The competitive nature of the sport lured Coghlan into playing, as well as being on a level playing field again.

At the time she started playing wheelchair basketball, no women's team existed in Victoria. Coghlan had begun playing with the men, with players such as Kevin Coombs and Sandy Blythe. Coghlan approached Wheelchair Sports Victoria to create a team for the Women's National League.

To qualify for the 1992 Barcelona Games, the Australian team had to travel to Stoke Mandeville in England to qualify. The qualifying tournament required the team to beat France and Japan. The national team managed to win the tournament, and they qualified for the Games. At the Barcelona Games, the Gliders finished fourth.

One particular sporting highlight for Coghlan was wearing the green and gold at the 1992 Barcelona Games because it was the first time Australia would be represented in women's wheelchair basketball.

Coghlan left the Australian team after the 1992 Games to have her son, James. In 1995, the coach for the Gliders, Peter Corr, asked her to come back and play in the 1996 Games in Atlanta. At the Atlanta Games the Gliders placed fourth. At the 1997 World Championships, the Gliders won a bronze medal.

The Sydney 2000 Games was a major turning point for paralympic sport. There was a stronger connection between the paralympic athletes and the able-bodied athletes, and Coghlan's public profile had increased. The Gliders had been undefeated and had reached the gold medal play off against Canada, but they were defeated.

Coghlan was the Gliders team captain at the 2004 Games. She was also given the female captain role for the whole Paralympic team.
