= Sandy Blythe =

Australian wheelchair basketball player

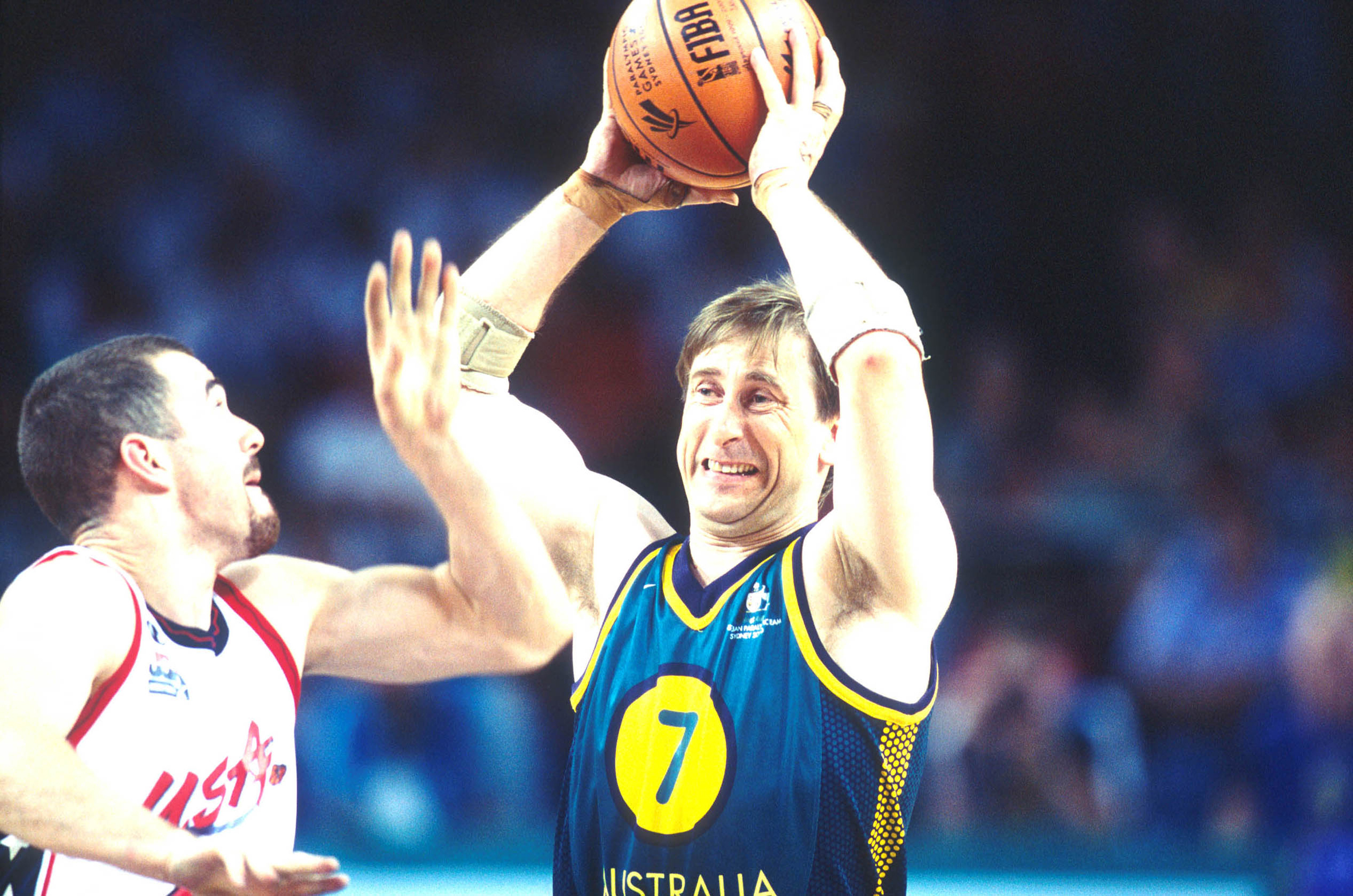
- Sandy Blythe in action during competition at the 2000 Sydney Paralympics

Personal information
- Full name: Robert Alexander Blythe
- Nationality: Australian
- Born: 24 February 1962 Geelong, Victoria, Australia
- Died: 18 November 2005 (aged 43) Melbourne, Victoria, Australia
Medal record
Men's wheelchair basketball
Representing Australia
Paralympic Games
| Gold medal – first place | 1996 Atlanta | Team competition |

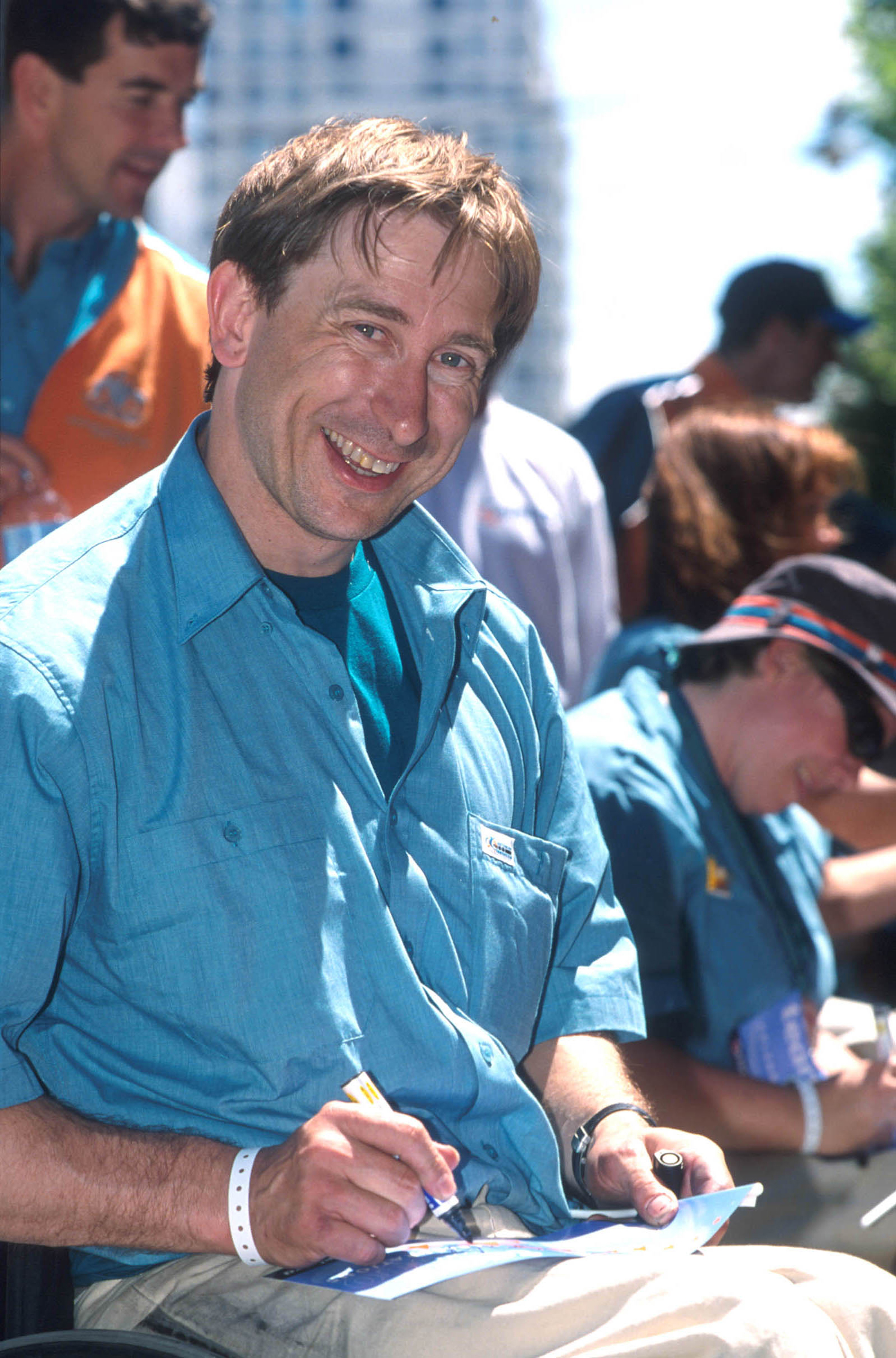
Blythe signing autographs to a fan's item at the Welcome Home Parade after the 2000 Summer Paralympics

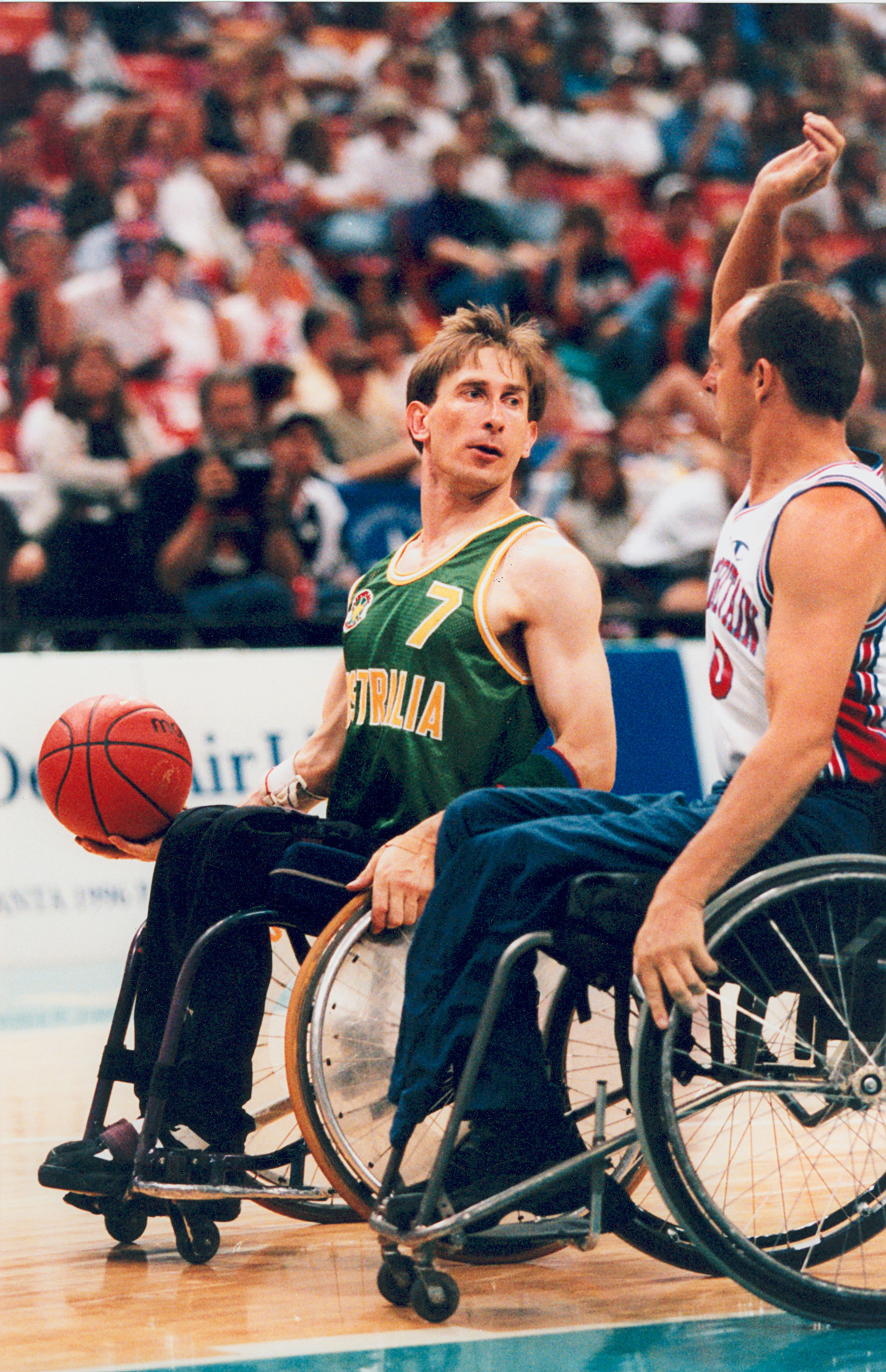
Blythe in a match against Great Britain at the 1996 Atlanta Paralympics

Robert Alexander "Sandy" Blythe, OAM (24 February 1962 – 18 November 2005) was an Australian wheelchair basketball player. He became a paraplegic due to a car accident in 1981, and went on to participate in the Australia men's national wheelchair basketball team at four Paralympic Games, captaining the gold medal-winning team at the 1996 Atlanta Paralympics. He died by suicide in 2005 at the age of 43 after a long illness.

== Biography ==
Blythe was born in Geelong on 24 February 1962 and grew up in a farm outside the Victorian town of Derrinallum. As a teenager, he was a champion Australian rules football player. He played in the Teal Cup and was later part of the St Kilda Football Club country squad. In 1981, he began studying at the Ballarat College of Advanced Education. Later the same year, he was involved in a three-car collision that rendered him paraplegic. In 1984, he obtained his physical education degree on schedule, despite his six-month rehabilitation at Austin Hospital.

He was part of the Australia men's national wheelchair basketball team at the 1988 Seoul, 1992 Barcelona, 1996 Atlanta, and 2000 Sydney Paralympics. He was the captain of the team when it won a gold medal at the 1996 Atlanta Games and was co-captain with Priya Cooper of the Australian Paralympic team at the 2000 Sydney Games. He had an Australian Institute of Sport scholarship in 1998 for wheelchair basketball.

Blythe was a motivational speaker who formed and worked in several businesses that improved public awareness of people with disabilities. In 2000, he released a memoir, Blythe Spirit.

On 18 November 2005, Blythe died by suicide; for several years he had had depression and chronic fatigue syndrome. At the time of his death, he had been in an eight-year domestic partnership with wheelchair basketball player Paula Coghlan.

== Recognition ==
In 1997, Blythe received a Medal of the Order of Australia for his 1996 Paralympic gold medal. In 2000, he received an Australian Sports Medal.

The Sandy Blythe Medal, awarded to the best player of the year in the Australia men's national wheelchair basketball team, is named in his honour. In 2010, he was posthumously inducted into the Australian Basketball Hall of Fame.
