= Karen Farrell =

Australian wheelchair basketball player

Personal information
- Nationality: Australian
- Born: 24 April 1962 (age 64) Glasgow, Scotland
Medal record
Wheelchair basketball
Paralympic Games
Silver medal – second place	2000 Sydney	Women's wheelchair basketball
Silver medal – second place	2004 Athens	Women's wheelchair basketball

Karen Farrell (born 24 April 1962) is an Australian wheelchair basketball player, who won two silver medals at the Paralympic Games.

== Personal ==
She was born in Glasgow, Scotland. Farrell is from Sydney. She became a paraplegic at the age of fifteen, when a car she was a passenger in slid off the road after trying to pass a truck. At the time of the accident, she was not belted into her seat and sustained back, head and neck injuries. Other passengers in the car who were belted in had much less severe injuries. When she is not competing, she works as an Information Technology Consultant.

== Basketball ==
Farrell is a New South Wales Institute of Sport athlete. She has been a member of the New South Wales women's state basketball team and competed at the national championships. In 2001, she was a scholarship holder at the Australian Institute of Sport. In 2000, she was also sponsored by the Motor Accidents Authority in New South Wales.

=== National team ===
Farrell was a member of Australia's national team by 1994. That year and in 1998, she was part of the Australian team that finished third at the Gold Cup tournament. She won two silver medals as part of the Australia women's national wheelchair basketball team at the 2000 Sydney and 2004 Athens Paralympics.

=== Club basketball ===
In 2008, Farrell played her club basketball of the Women's National Wheelchair Basketball League (WNWBL)'s Hills Hornets. Her team mates included Liesl Tesch, who was on the same team as Farrell when they earned their 2000 and 2004 Paralympic medals.

== Recognition ==
In 2008, Farrell received a Basketball Australia Merit Award.
