= Lisa Edmonds =

Australian wheelchair basketball player

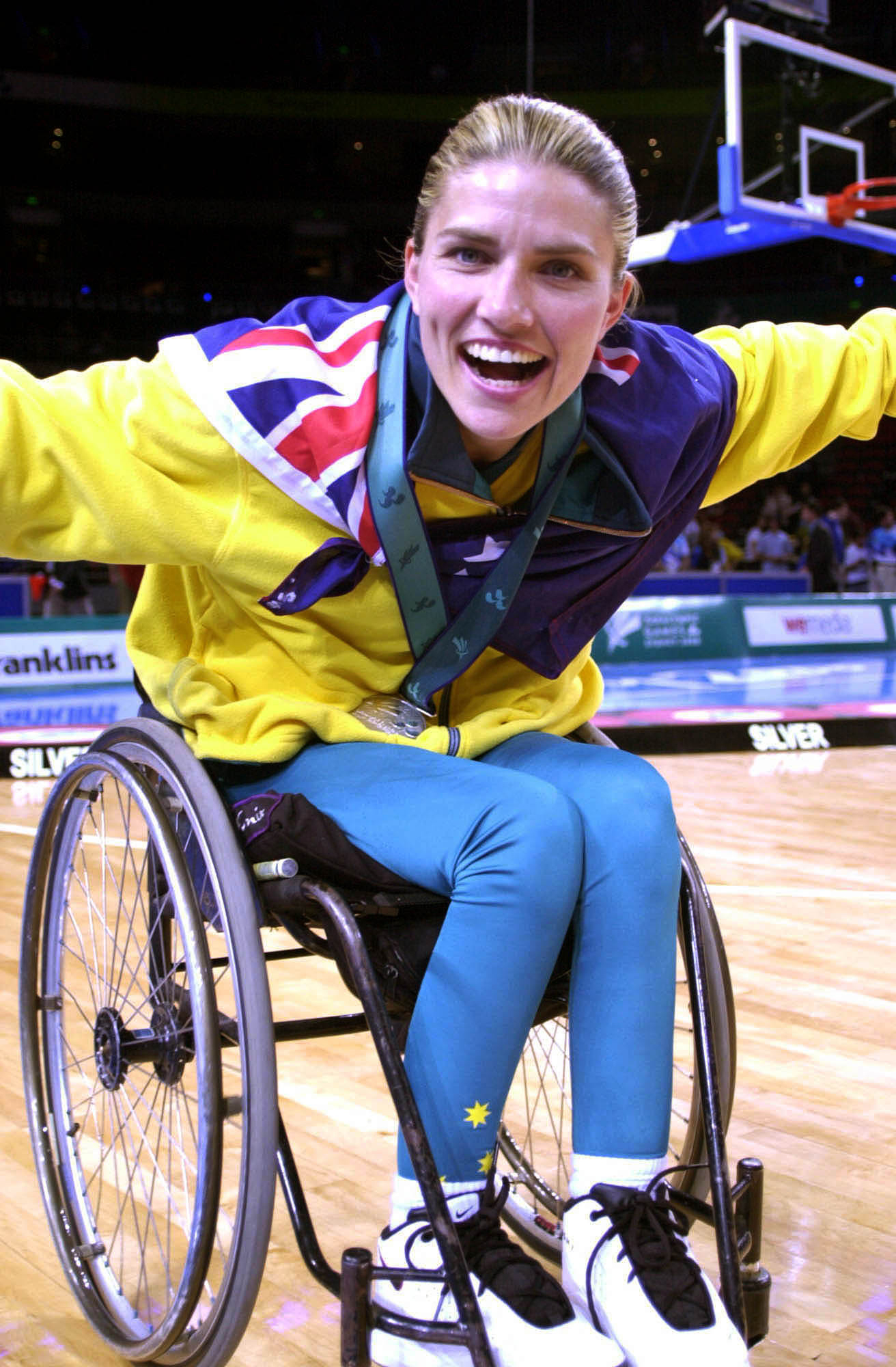
- Edmonds (nee O'Nion) celebrates winning silver at the 2000 Sydney Paralympics

Personal information
- Nationality: Australia
- Born: 5 June 1967 (age 59) Hertfordshire, England

Sport
- Sport: Wheelchair basketball
- Disability class: 3.0
- Club: Stacks Goudkamp Bears
Medal record
Wheelchair basketball
Paralympic Games
Silver medal – second place	2000 Sydney	Women's wheelchair basketball

Lisa Edmonds (née O'Nion) (born 5 June 1967 in Hertfordshire, England) is a wheelchair basketball player from Australia. She was part of the silver medal-winning Australia women's national wheelchair basketball team at the 2000 Summer Paralympics. She retired from competitive wheelchair basketball in 2013 and is regarded as one of the pioneers of the women's game in Australia.

== Wheelchair Basketball ==
=== Career ===
At the age of 20, Craig Jarvis, a Sport and Recreation Officer at the Prince of Wales Hospital Spinal Cord Injuries Unit, introduced Edmonds to wheelchair basketball. She stated that: I left the hospital, bought a basketball and pushed up and down the street trying to bounce the ball. I absolutely loved the challenge and being active. Edmonds was part of the birth of women's wheelchair basketball in Australia. In 1989, she was a member of the training/selection camp for the first ever National women's team, now known as the Gliders. This camp was organized by Susan Hobbs. Edmonds went on to play 104 games for Australia from 1989 to 2002 and represented Australia at three Summer Paralympics. She was captain of the National team in 2002.

Edmonds played for the North Sydney Bears (now Stacks Goudkamp Bears) in the Women's National Wheelchair Basketball League since its inception in 2000. She was named in the League's All Star Five for four consecutive years - 2000 to 2003. She retired from competitive wheelchair basketball in September 2013. On her retirement she commented: If you start playing wheelchair basketball and fall in love with it and want to be the best you can be, you have to live it, breathe it, dream it and make the basketball something you can't be without, and in some cases the wheelchair!.

=== Representative Summary ===
On her retirement in September 2013, Edmonds representative career for Australia spanned from 1989 to 2002. She played for Australia 44 times in official international competitions and 60 times in other international competitions.

Year	Event	No of Games
1989	FESPIC Games, Kobe, Japan	4
1990	World Championships, St Etienne, France	5
1992	French Tournament	5
1992	IWBF Paralympic Qualifier - Stoke, England	5
1992	Netherlands Tournament	5
1992	Summer Paralympics, Barcelona, Spain	5
1994	World Championships, Stoke Mandeville, England	5
1995	German Tournament	5
1996	Edmonton/Toronto Tournaments	8
1996	Summer Paralympics, Atlanta, United States	5
1998	Netherlands Tournament	5
1998	World Championships, Sydney, Australia	5
1999	United States Series	5
1999	Osaka Cup, Japan	6
2000	SLAM Series Paralympic Test Event	5
2000	Roosevelt Cup, Warm Springs, United States	4
2000	Summer Paralympics, Sydney, Australia	5
2002	Japan Tournament	4
2002	Roosevelt Cup, Warm Springs, United States	4
2002	Tournament, Alabama, United States	4
2002	World Championships, Kitakyushu, Japan	5

== Para ice hockey ==
Edmonds is part of the Australian team for the 2026 Women's World Para Ice Hockey Championships in the New South Wales city of Newcastle.

== Education ==
In England, she attended Woodlands Primary School and Nicholas Hawksmoor. In 2008, she completed an Advanced Diploma Event Management (TAFE).
