= Donna Ritchie =

Australian wheelchair basketball player (born 1963)

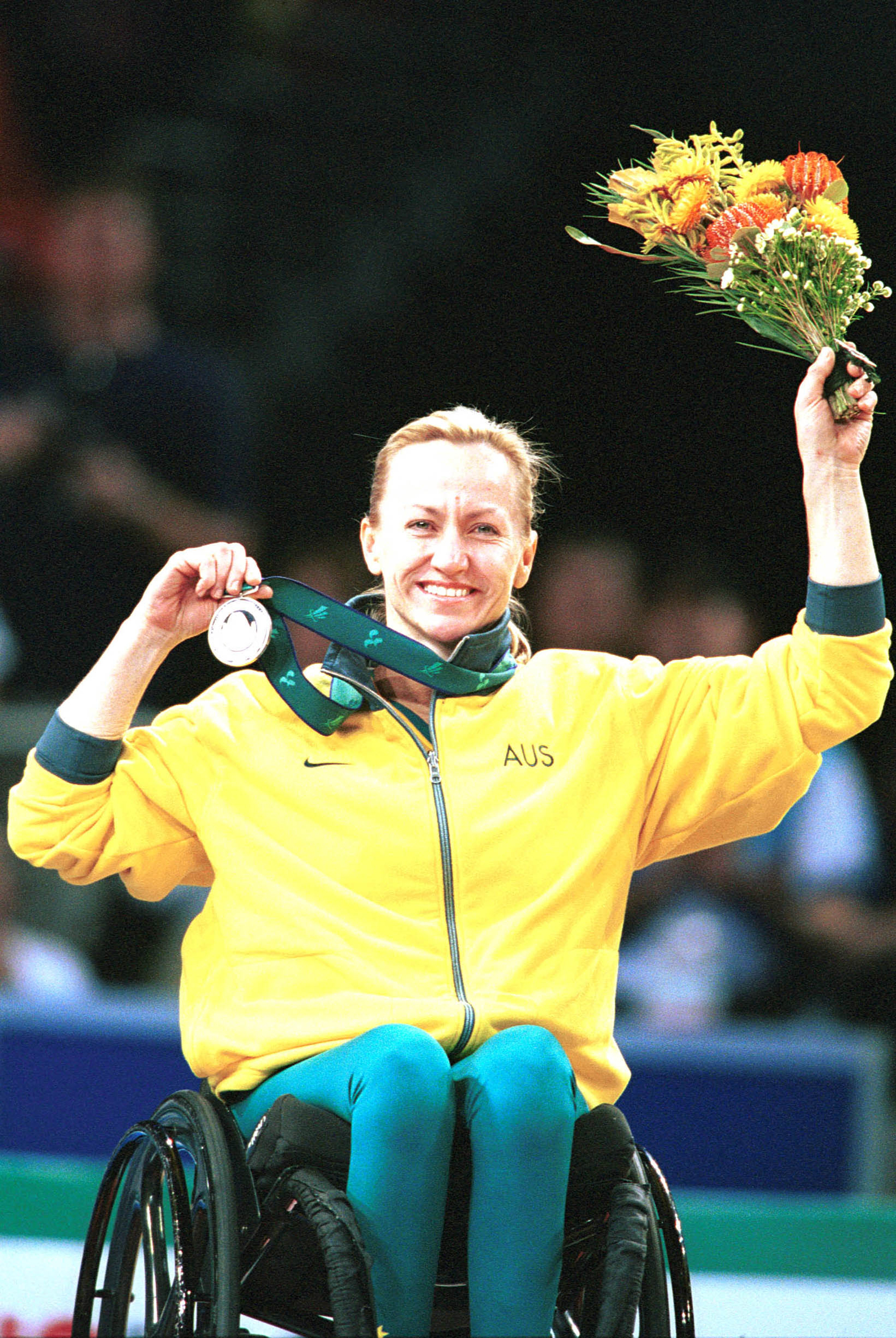
- Ritchie celebrates with her silver medal at the 2000 Sydney Paralympics

Personal information
- Nationality: Australia
- Born: 28 December 1963 (age 62) Manly, New South Wales
Medal record
Wheelchair basketball
Paralympic Games
Silver medal – second place	2000 Sydney	Women's wheelchair basketball
World Championships
Bronze medal – third place	1994 Sydney	Women's wheelchair basketball
Bronze medal – third place	1998 Germany	Women's wheelchair basketball

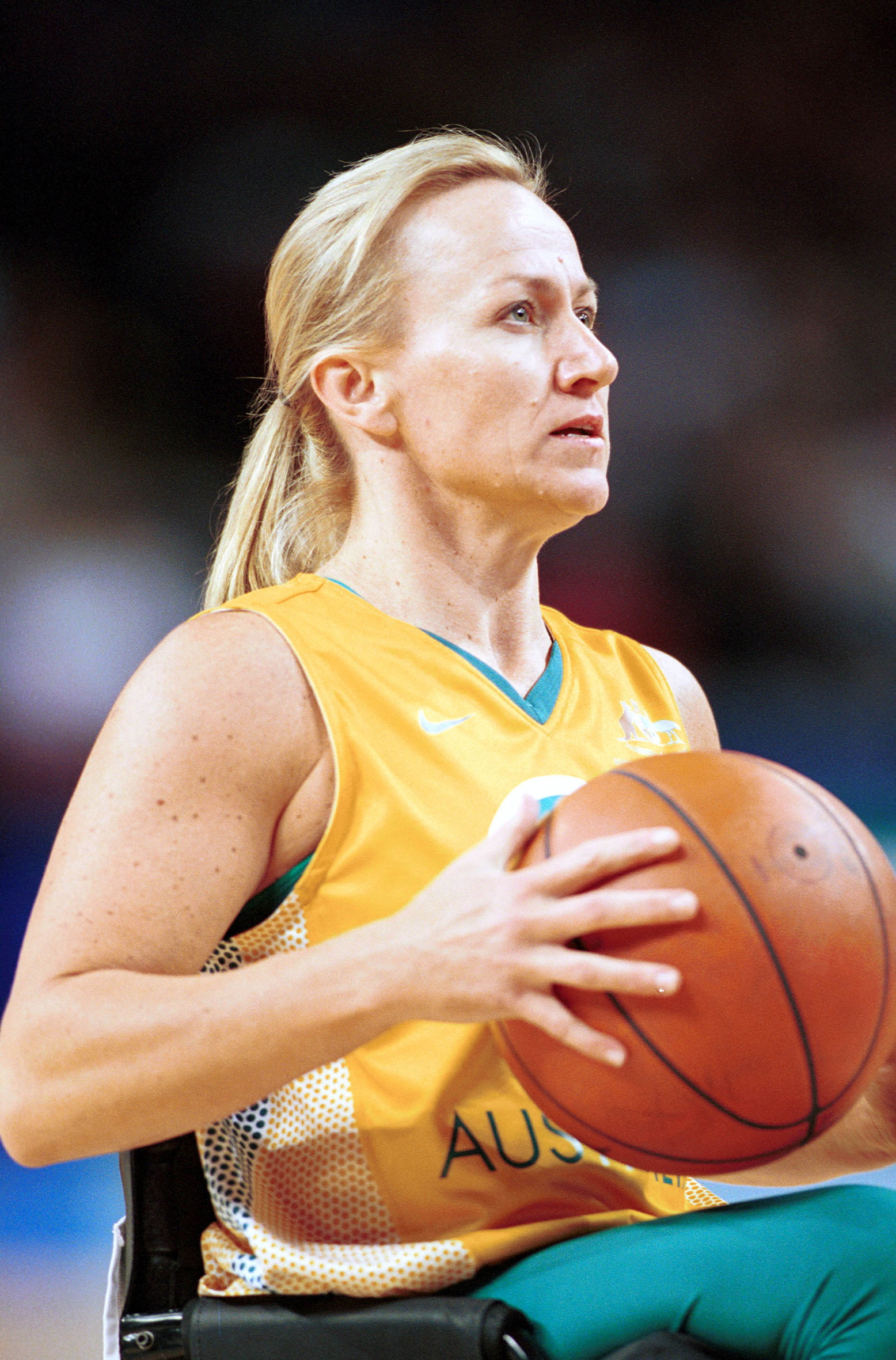
Ritchie poises with the ball for a free throw during 2000 Summer Paralympics match

Donna Ritchie (born 28 December 1963 in Manly, New South Wales is an Australian former wheelchair basketball player. She was part of the silver medal-winning Australia women's national wheelchair basketball team at the 2000 Summer Paralympics.

== Personal ==
Richie was born on 28 December 1963 in Manly, New South Wales. Her parents were Ray and Georgina with siblings Sharon and Raymond. Her father, Ray, played first-grade rugby league for the Manly Sea Eagles and served as the team's first-grade coach from 1981 to 1982. At the age of 23, Ritchie broke the T5 and T6 vertebrae in her spine after falling backwards from a stone wall at Manly Beach.

During the 1996 Atlanta Paralympics, she met Dutch wheelchair basketballer Koen Jansens. They married in 1999 and have a son and a daughter.

"Paralympians don't have the time to worry about what doesn't work, they maximise what does!'”

— Donna Ritchie

In the lead-up to the 2000 Sydney Paralympics, Ritchie served as the Sydney Paralympic Organising Committee's Community Relations Manager. She has been a board member of the New South Wales Institute of Sport since December 1995. As of 2015, she was the general manager of Investment at Telstra Business and continued to serve as a New South Wales Institute of Sport board member.

== Basketball career ==
Whilst recovering from her accident in hospital, Ritchie saw wheelchair basketballers training and this led to her taking up the sport. Her wheelchair basketball classification was 1.5 points. She attended three Paralympics Games—1992 Barcelona, 1996 Atlanta and 2000 Sydney. The Gliders—national women's basketball team—came fourth in 1992 and 1996, and won the silver medal in 2000. Ritchie served as vice-captain at the 1992 Games and captain at both the 1996 and 2000 Games.

Ritchie was a member of the Gliders at three World Championships—1990, 1994 and 1998. The Gliders won the bronze medal in 1994 and 1998.

== Recognition ==
- Manly Pathway of Olympians
- Australian Sports Medal
- Northern Beaches Sporting Hall of Fame – inducted in 2003
