= Jeremy Synot =

Jeremy James Synot
Personal information
- Born: 7 July 1988 (age 38) Essendon, Victoria

Jeremy James Synot (born 7 July 1988) is an Australian former wheelchair basketball player and current National Wheelchair Basketball League Head Coach of the RSL Queensland Spinning Bullets.

== Early life ==
Synot was born in Essendon, Victoria to parents Donna and Paul. He is the 3rd eldest of 3 boys and 3 girls.

Synot was born with a rare condition known as Osteogenesis Imperfecta or Brittle Bones Disease (Type IV), which meant he was prone to bone fractures from a young age. In his early years of life, preventative surgeries were undertaken to limit severity and frequency of fractures; particularly in his right femur. He has two siblings who also had the rare bone condition.

== Education ==
Synot attended Greenvale Primary School from 1994 to 2000 and completed his Victorian Certificate of Education at Penola Catholic College from 2001 to 2006. He was taught P.E by former Richmond and West Coast AFL/VFL player Richard Geary.

In 2010, he achieved an undergraduate degree in Health Science at Monash University. In 2014, he completed a graduate diploma in Middle Years Education at the Queensland University of Technology.

== Wheelchair Tennis ==
Synot started his sporting career as a junior wheelchair tennis player at Kingsville Tennis Club, 10 minutes west of Melbourne's CBD. He was a consistent performer achieving semi final placings at the Bendigo Open in 2001 and 2002. Synot competed in the junior doubles at the 2001 Australian Open where he was partnered with longtime friend and Australian Tennis representative Ben Beare to reach the final. Beare and Synot were defeated in the final by Heath Davidson and 2015 Australian Wheelchair Open Quad Singles Champion Dylan Alcott in a 3rd-set tiebreaker.

== Wheelchair Basketball: Playing career ==
Synot took a break until 2007 to focus on school and university before a chance interaction with former doubles partner Ben Beare led him back into sport.

Synot played wheelchair basketball for 9 months before being selected to play for Victoria at the 2007 Junior Nationals, held in Narrabeen, New South Wales. He would go on to play a consistent tournament before breaking his arm in the semi-final against Western Australia. Victoria would go on to win the game before losing in the final to tournament favourites – New South Wales. Synot was named to play for Australia in the junior representative game against the USA.

Synot made the jump in 2008 to play in the NWBL competition with the Dandenong Rangers. Dandenong would go on to finish 4th that season with Synot playing every game.

In 2009, Synot played few minutes for the entirety of the season due to inconsistent form and a deep roster. Synot narrowly missed out on a spot in the U23's Australian Team who competed in the 2009 U23 IWBF World Championships. The team would go on to finish fourth in Paris, France.

In 2010, Synot under new coach Brett Paxton had an impact at times coming off the bench in a mid pointer rotation. Dandenong would achieve a third placing in the league that season.

Driven by narrow misses and lack of opportunities, Synot worked hard and forged a spot in the team for the 2011 season. His first 4 games showed improvement averaging 7.5 ppg, 3.3 apg and 1.2 rpg. Synot was also awarded with an MVP at the Albury Wodonga State Tournament and was a member of the All Star 5 in the Basketball Australia Frank Ponta Cup.

In June 2011, Synot broke his right femur, which sidelined him for the rest of the season.

In 2012, Synot would make the switch to the RSL Queensland Brisbane Bullets. He would go on to have a serviceable year averaging 4 points per 11 minutes game time throughout the season.

Synot announced his retirement at the end of the 2012 season, citing injury as the reason.

== Coaching career: NWBL ==
Synot received an offer to become the assistant coach of the Queensland Juniors Wheelchair Basketball Team in 2013. He was promoted mid year with a role as technical coach across the Queensland National League Program. The RSL Queensland Spinning Bullets would go on to finish 3rd in that season.

In 2014, Synot was offered the opportunity to coach the RSL Queensland Spinning Bullets. RSL Queensland Spinning Bullets finished 2nd in the regular season and advanced through to the Championship game defeating home side Perth Wheelcats by 3 points. Perth Wheelcats would go on to make the final through a semi final and reverse the results on the Sunday and be crowned Champions for the 2014. This was the third time the RSL Queensland Spinning Bullets were runners up in the NWBL competition history.

Synot was awarded Coach of the Year in the NWBL for the 2014 season in his rookie year.

== International coaching ==
In November 2014, Synot was selected by Australian Coach Ben Ettridge as a development coach to tour Kitakyushu, Japan where the team would claim 3rd place in the competition.

== Personal ==
Synot is an avid golfer and is prominent supporter of the North Melbourne Football Club in the AFL. He also has strong ties to horse racing through childhood friend and ex Melbourne Cup winning jockey, Greg Hall.

Synot is currently vice-president of not-for-profit organisation Sporting Wheelies and Disabled Association. He has served as a board member since 2013.
