= Melanie Domaschenz =

Australian wheelchair basketball player

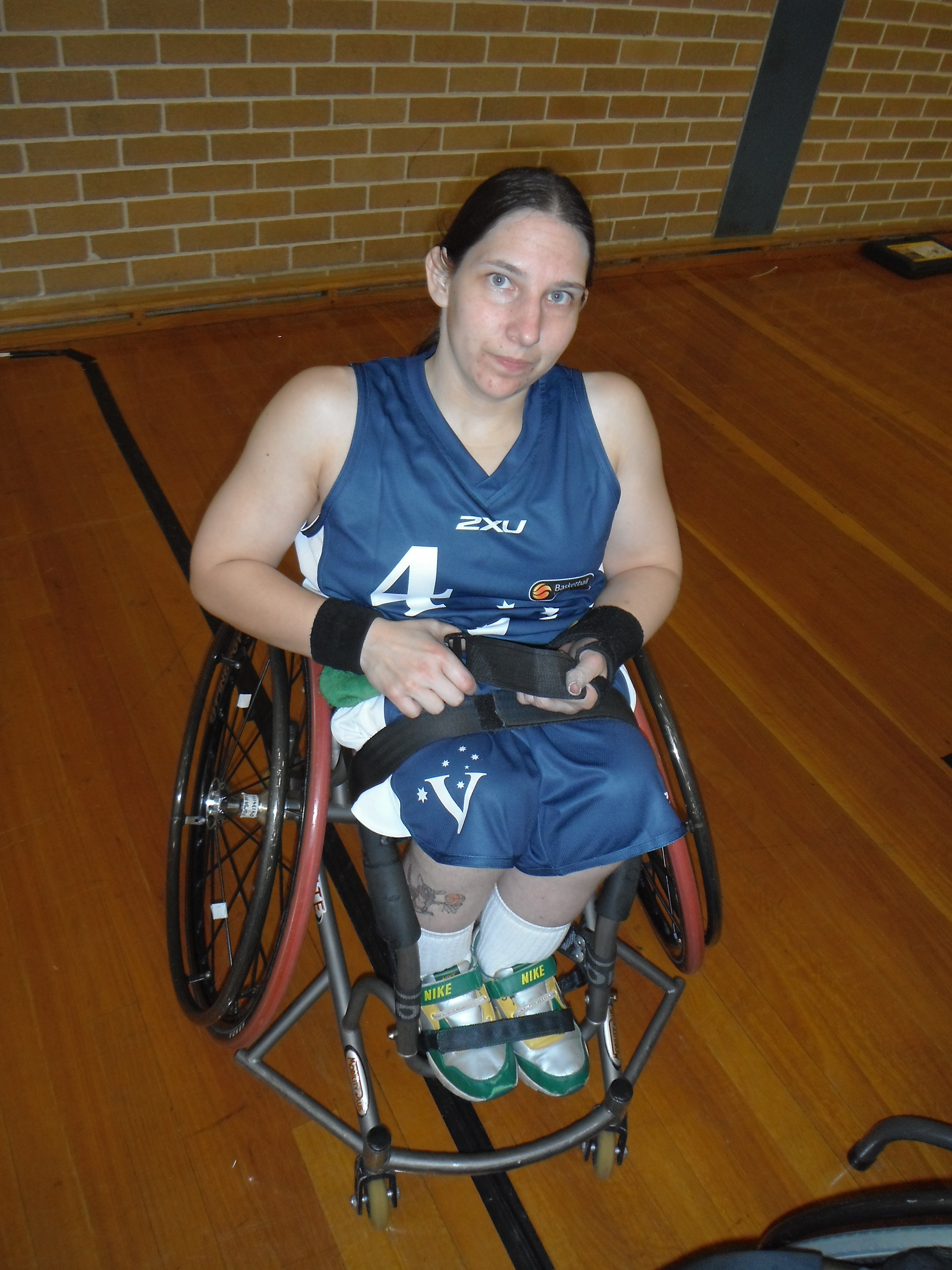
- Melanie Domaschenz playing wheelchair basketball for Victoria

Personal information
- Nickname: Doma
- Nationality: Australia
- Born: 13 October 1983 (age 42)

Sport
- Club: Victoria
Medal record
Wheelchair basketball
Paralympic Games
Silver medal – second place	2004 Athens	Women's Wheelchair Basketball
Bronze medal – third place	2008 Beijing	Women's Wheelchair Basketball

Melanie Domaschenz (born 13 October 1983) is an Australian wheelchair basketball player who is part of the Australia women's national wheelchair basketball team. She won a silver medal at the 2004 Summer Paralympics in Athens and a bronze medal at the 2008 Summer Paralympics in Beijing with the Australia women's national wheelchair basketball team, known as the Gliders.

== Personal ==
Melanie Domaschenz was born in Geelong, Victoria, on 13 October 1983 with spina bifida. She is nicknamed "Doma". She was educated at Grovedale Primary and Grovedale Secondary College, and lives in the Geelong suburb of Marshall. In addition to playing wheelchair basketball, Domaschenz has competed at a national level in archery.

== Wheelchair basketball ==
Domaschenz is a 1 point player, who plays guard, and usually wears the number four. She began competing in wheelchair basketball in 1993 and first represented Australia in the sport in 2003. That year Domaschenz won a gold medal as part of the Under 20 Australian team at the New Zealand National Basketball tournament. She made her debut with the Australia women's national wheelchair basketball team, known as the Gliders, at the North American Cup, and at the United States championships later that year. She was selected for the Gliders for the 2004 Summer Paralympics in Athens, and won a silver medal there. She later said that her greatest sporting moment was Australia's one-point defeat of the United States.

Domaschenz played in the Under 23 Asia-Oceania Junior Championships Malaysia in 2005. She was with the Gliders again at the 2005 Oceania Qualifying Tournament in Goyang in South Korea, and at the 2006 IWBF World Championship in Amsterdam, where the Gliders were fourth. In 2007 Wheelchair Sports Victoria named Domaschenz their best female athlete in a team sport. She played for the Gliders at the 2008 Roosevelt Tournament and North America Cup, and at the Osaka Cup Japan in 2008. She achieved Paralympic selection a second time in 2008, and won a bronze medal at the 2008 Summer Paralympics in Beijing. She was also part of the team at the 2010 IWBF World Championship in Birmingham, England, in which the Gliders were again placed fourth, and at the 2010 Paralympic World Cup in Manchester.

Although Domaschenz attended the Gliders' training camp in January 2012, she missed out on selection and was omitted from the Gliders squad for the 2012 Summer Paralympic Games in London. However, Domaschenz returned to the Gliders line up for the 2013 Osaka Cup in Japan, where the Gliders successfully defended the title they had previously won in 2008, 2009, 2010 and 2012.

In addition to playing for the national team, Domaschenz has played for the Dandenong Rangers in the Women's National Wheelchair Basketball League (WNWBL). She was part of the team that won back-to-back championships in 2001 and 2012. In 2013, the team has been renamed "Victoria", but Domaschenz continues to play in the number four jersey.

Season statistics
Competition	Season	Matches	FGM-A	FG%	3PM-A	3P%	FTM-A	FT%	PFS	Pts	TOT	AST	PTS
WNWBL	2013	4	3-8	37.5	---	0.0	---	0.0	5	6	1.3	0.8	1.5
WNWBL	2012	14	4-21	19.0	---	0.0	---	0.0	7	8	0.8	0.2	0.6
WNWBL	2011	18	11-27	40.7	---	0.0	---	0.0	13	22	0.7	1.1	1.2
WNWBL	2010	18	7-21	33.3	---	0.0	---	0.0	21	14	1.5	0.9	0.8
WNWBL	2009	5	7-27	25.9	---	0.0	---	0.0	12	14	1.5	0.6	0.8
