= Melanie Hall (basketball) =

Australian wheelchair basketball player

Personal information
- Nickname: Red
- Nationality: Australia
- Born: 11 January 1977 (age 49) Darwin, Northern Territory
Medal record
Wheelchair basketball
Paralympic Games
Bronze medal – third place	2008 Beijing	Women's wheelchair basketball

Melanie Hall (born 11 January 1977) is a wheelchair basketball player from Australia. She is a paraplegic as a result of a motor vehicle accident. She was part of the bronze medal-winning Australia women's national wheelchair basketball team at the 2008 Summer Paralympics.
