= Jeanette (given name) =

- Pronunciation: /dʒəˈnɛt/ jə-NET
- Gender: Female

Origin
- Meaning: God is gracious
- Region of origin: French

Other names
- Related names: Jeanne, Janett, Janette, Janet, Jane, Jean, Jennette, Ginette, Sinéad, Žaneta, Żaneta, Zsanett

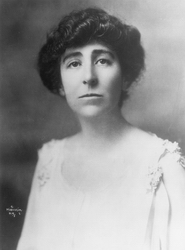
Jeannette Rankin, former U.S. Representative from Montana

Jeanette (or Jeannette, Jeannetta or Jeanetta) is a female name, a diminutive form of the name Jeanne. Other variations are Janette and Janet. The name is derived from the Hebrew "God is gracious".

== Notable people ==
- Jeanette (born 1951), Spanish singer
- Jeanette Antolin (born 1981), American gymnast
- Jeannette Armstrong (born 1948), Canadian author
- Jeanetta Arnette (born 1954), American actress
- Jeanette Aw (born 1979), Singaporean actress
- Jeannette Osborn Baylies (1912–1984), American clubwoman
- Jeannette Benavides (born 1952), Costa Rican nanotechnologist and physical chemist
- Jeannette Jara (born 1974), Chilean politician and lawyer
- Jeanette Berglind (1816–1903), Swedish sign language pedagogue
- Jeanette Biedermann (born 1980), German singer and actress
- Jeannette Bougrab, French lawyer and politician
- Jeanette Burrage (born 1952), American politician
- Jeannette Campbell (1916–2003), Argentine Olympic swimmer
- Jeanette Crossley (1949–2015), New Zealand biochemist
- Jeanette Dyrkjær (1963–2011), Danish nude model and adult actress
- Jeannette Escanilla (born 1961), Swedish politician
- Jeannette zu Fürstenberg (born 1982), German businesswoman
- Jeannette Gadson (1945–2007), New York politician
- Jeanette Granberg (1825–1857), Swedish playwright
- Jeanette Guysi (1873–1966), American painter
- Jeannette Lee, British music record executive
- Jeannette H. Lee (formerly Jeannette Lee White), American entrepreneur
- Jeanette Lee (born 1971), American professional pool player
- Jeanette Loff (1906–1942), American actress and singer
- Jeanette Lynes, Canadian author, poet and professor
- Jeanette MacDonald (1903–1965), American actress and singer
- Jennette McCurdy (born 1992), American actress
- Jeanette DuBois Meech (1835–1911), American evangelist and industrial educator
- Jeanetta Calhoun Mish (born 1961), American poet
- Jeannette Ng, Hong Kong-born British fantasy author
- Jeanette Oppenheim (born 1952), Danish lawyer and politician, MEP
- Jeannette Rankin (1880–1973), American social worker, first woman elected to the United States Congress
- Jeannette Scalé (1862-1938) British entrepreneur
- Jeanette Ullyett (born 1986), New Zealand cricketer
- Jeannette Walls (born 1960), American writer
- Jeannette Walworth (1835–1918), American novelist, journalist
- Jeanette Wässelius (1784–1853), Swedish opera singer
- Jeanette Winterson (born 1959), British novelist

== Fictional characters ==
- Jeannette (comics), a fictional banshee in the DC Comics Universe
- Jeanette Miller, one of the Chipettes in Alvin and the Chipmunks
- Jeanette Turner is one of the two main protagonists of Freeform's 2021 miniseries Cruel Summer

== See also ==
- Jeanette (disambiguation)
