= Janetta =

Janetta is a given name. Notable people with the name include:

- Janetta Rebold Benton, American art historian
- Janetta Douglas, née Smith, MBE, Papua New Guinean charity worker
- Janetta Gillespie (1876–1956), Scottish artist
- Janetta Johnson (born 1964), African-American transgender rights activist
- Janetta McStay CBE (1917–2012), New Zealand concert pianist and music professor
- Lavinia Janetta Horton de Serres Ryves (1797–1871), British woman claiming to be a member of the British royal family
- Ruth Janetta Temple (1892–1984), American physician in Los Angeles, California
- Janetta Vance (1855–1921), British archer

== See also ==
- Bathyergus janetta or Namaqua dune mole-rat (Bathyergus janetta)
- Euphaedra janetta, the Janetta Themis forester butterfly
- Syntherata janetta, commonly known as the emperor moth
- Tagiades janetta spread-winged skipper butterfly
- Janet (disambiguation)
- Janette (disambiguation)
- Jannette
- Jeanetta (disambiguation)
- Jeanette (disambiguation)
- Jennata
