= Jennett =

Jennett is both a surname and a given name. Notable people with the name include:

- Bryan Jennett (1926–2008), pioneering professor of neurosurgery in Glasgow
- Seán Jennett (1912–1981), author of many travel books, typographer for Faber and Faber
- Jennett Humphreys (1829–1917), English author, poet, and contributor to major reference works
- Leonard Jennett Simpson (1882–1940), physician and political figure in Ontario

== See also ==
- Jeanetta (disambiguation)
- Jeanette (disambiguation)
- JenNet-IP
- Jennet
