= Ginette =

Ginette or Ginnette is a feminine given name and nickname which may refer to:

== Given name ==
- Ginette Amara (born 1962), Central African academician, veterinarian, and politician
- Ginette Anfousse (born 1944), Canadian writer and illustrator of children's books
- Ginette Marguerite Auger (1920–2004), stage name Genevieve, French comedian, actress, and singer
- Ginette Aumassip (1931–2025), French geologist and archaeologist
- Ginette Baudin (1921–1971), French actress
- Ginette Bedard (born 1933), French-born American long distance runner
- Ginette Bingguely-Lejeune (1895–1969), French sculptor
- Ginette Bouchard (1952–2004), Canadian photographer
- Ginette Bucaille (1926–2021), French tennis player
- Ginette Daleu (1977–2018) Cameroonian artist
- Gigi Dennis (born 1961), American politician
- Ginette Dior (1917–2008), World War II French Resistance fighter
- Ginette Durand (1929–2018), French gymnast
- Ginette Gosselin Ferszt, American nurse
- Ginette Gamatis (born 1944), a politician
- Ginette Garcin (1928–2010), French actress
- Ginette Gaubert (1904–1987), French model and film actress
- Ginette Grandmont, Seychellois politician
- Ginette Hamelin (1913–1944), French engineer and architect
- Ginette Harrison (1958–1999), British mountain climber
- Ginette Jany-Sendral (born 1932), French former swimmer
- Ginette Jullian (1917–1962), French World War II Special Operations Executive agent in occupied France
- Ginette Keller (1925–2010), French composer
- Ginette Kolinka (born 1925), French Holocaust survivor
- Ginette Lantelme (1883–1911), French stage actress
- Ginette Laurin (born 1955), Canadian dancer, choreographer, and artistic director
- Ginette Lavack, Canadian politician
- Ginette Leclerc (1912–1992), French actress
- Ginette L'Heureux, Canadian politician serving from 1986 to 1994
- Ginette Maddie (1898–1980), French actress
- Ginette Magny (fl. 21st century), Canadian film costume designer
- Ginette Marotte, Canadian politician first elected in 2001
- Ginette Martenot (1902–1996), French pianist
- Ginette Mathiot (1907–1998), French food writer
- Ginette McDonald (born 1952), New Zealand actress and television producer
- Ginette Moulin (1927–2025), French billionaire heiress
- Ginette Neveu (1919–1949), French violinist
- Ginette Michaud Privert (born 1956), Haitian physician, radiologist, and diplomat
- Ginette Petitpas Taylor (born 1968 or 1969), Canadian politician
- Ginette Ravel (1940–2022), Canadian singer and lyricist
- Ginette Reno (born 1946), Canadian singer, songwriter, and actress
- Ginnette del Rosario (born 1986), Dominican retired volleyball player
- Ginette Rossini (born 1939), Luxembourgian fencer
- Ginette Seguin (1934–2019), Canadian alpine skier
- Ginette Tate (born 1965), a 13-year-old British girl who disappeared while delivering newspapers
- Ginette Vincendeau (born 1948), professor of film studies at King's College London

== Nickname ==
- Ginette Spanier (1904–1988), French director of Paris fashion house Balmain
