= Timothy Schwartz-Barcott =

American sociologist (1942–2021)

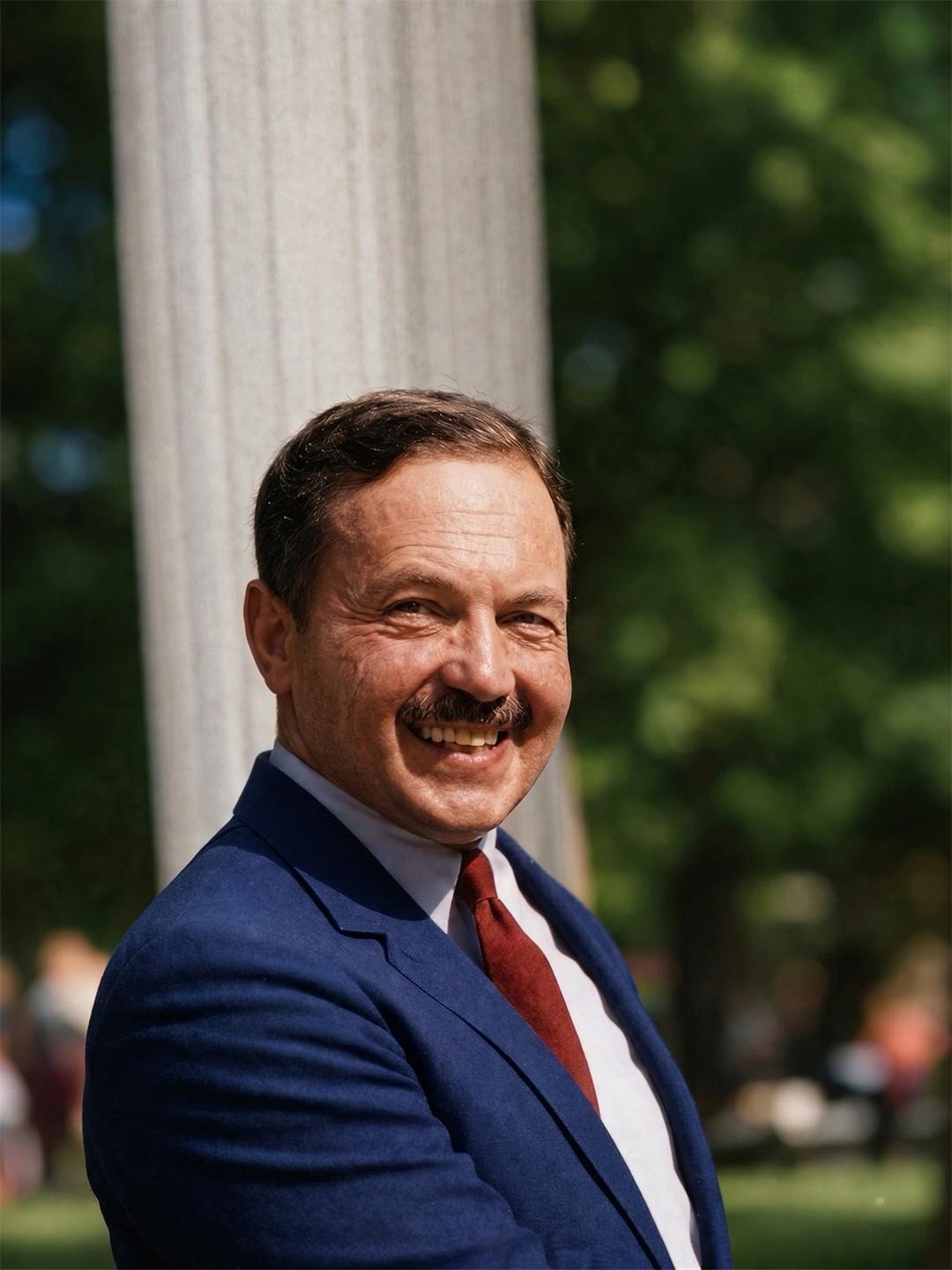
- Born: Timothy Philip Schwartz; December 8, 1942; Latrobe, Pennsylvania, US
- Died: October 28, 2021 (aged 78); West Greenwich, Rhode Island, US
- Spouse: Donna Schwartz-Barcott (m. 1972)

Academic background
- Education: Miami University; University of North Carolina at Chapel Hill (MA and PhD in Sociology)
- Thesis: Societal Energy Consumption: An Evolutionary Theory and a Preliminary Empirical Analysis (1975)
- Doctoral advisor: Gerhard Lenski

Academic work
- Discipline: Sociology
- Institutions: University of North Carolina at Chapel Hill; University of Connecticut; University of Delaware; Brown University; Providence College; Rhode Island College
- Notable works: Societal Energy Consumption: An Evolutionary Theory and a Preliminary Empirical Analysis (1975); War, Terror, & Peace in the Qur'an and in Islam: Insights for Military and Government Leaders (2004); After the Disaster: Re-creating Community and Well-being at Buffalo Creek Since the Notorious Coal Mining Disaster in 1972 (2008); Concerning Caputo: Africa and Acts of Faith as Art, Science, and Much More (2013); Let There Be Light: Five Stories (2014); Violence, Terror, Genocide, and War in the Holy Books and in the Decades Ahead: New Psychological and Sociological Insights on how the Old Testament, ... and the Qur'an Might Influence Violence (2018)

Timothy Philip Schwartz-Barcott (December 8, 1942 – October 28, 2021) was an American sociologist, author, and United States Marine Corps veteran.

He was known for his scholarly and interdisciplinary writings on war, religion, disaster recovery, and social system. He served as a Marine reconnaissance officer during the Vietnam War, where he was awarded the Bronze Star Medal with Combat “V” and the Purple Heart.

== Biography ==
Schwartz-Barcott was born in Latrobe, Pennsylvania to Philip John Schwartz, a World War II veteran and industrial arts teacher at Latrobe High School, and Delma Marianna Favro Schwartz. His grandparents were immigrants from Germany and Italy and worked in coal mining, steel production, and small business.

He served in Vietnam alongside the author of A Rumor of War Philip Caputo, who wrote: “With bullets cracking overhead, Tim leapt out of the trench to render aid to the wounded man… I followed him, inspired by his example.”

He attended Latrobe High School, where he was a varsity tennis player. He later studied at Miami University (Ohio), earning a bachelor’s degree in philosophy on a Navy ROTC scholarship. Upon graduation, he was commissioned as an infantry officer in the United States Marine Corps.

Schwartz-Barcott served in Vietnam in 1965 and 1966 as an infantry, civil affairs, and reconnaissance officer.

He was awarded the Bronze Star Medal with Combat “V” for valor and the Purple Heart.

== Academic career ==
After leaving the Marine Corps, Schwartz-Barcott pursued graduate studies in sociology at the University of North Carolina at Chapel Hill, where he earned his doctorate under sociologist Gerhard Lenski. His dissertation, Societal Energy Consumption: An Evolutionary Theory and a Preliminary Empirical Analysis, was inspired by Lenski’s sociology textbook Human Societies.

He held teaching and research positions at the University of North Carolina at Chapel Hill, the University of Connecticut, the University of Delaware, the Brown University, Providence College and Rhode Island College.

His academic work focused on social systems, religion and violence, disaster recovery, and inequality.

== Personal life ==
Schwartz-Barcott was married for 49 years to Donna Schwartz-Barcott , a professor of nursing at the University of Rhode Island. They had one son, Rye Barcott, the author and social entrepreneur.

=== Death ===
Schwartz-Barcott died on October 28, 2021, near his home in West Greenwich, Rhode Island, at the age of 78. CFK Africa established the Lux Sit scholarship in his honor.

== Selected bibliography ==
- Schwartz- Barcott, T.P (November 1, 2004). War, Terror, & Peace in the Qur'an and in Islam: Insights for Military and Government Leaders. The Army War College Foundation Press. ISBN 978-0970968227.
- Schwartz-Barcott, T.P (September 17, 2018). Violence, Terror, Genocide, and War in the Holy Books and in the Decades Ahead: New Psychological and Sociological Insights on how the Old Testament, ... and the Qur'an Might Influence Violence. Teneo Press. ISBN 978-1934844380.
- Schwartz-Barcott, Timothy Philip (2008). After the Disaster: Re-creating Community and Well-being at Buffalo Creek Since the Notorious Coal Mining Disaster in 1972. Cambria Press. ISBN 978-1-60497-550-5.
- Schwartz-Barcott, T. P. (2013-01-15). Concerning Caputo: Africa and Acts of Faith as Art, Science, and Much More. MILL CITY PressINC. ISBN 978-0-9848028-1-4.
- Schwartz-Barcott, T.P (July 29, 2014). Let There Be Light: Five Stories. Mill City Press, Inc. p. 232. ISBN 978-1626529090.
- Schwartz-Barcott, T.P (1975). Societal Energy Consumption: An Evolutionary Theory and a Preliminary Empirical Analysis. University of North Carolina at Chapel Hill.
