= With Honor Fund =

American super PAC working to elect military veterans

With Honor Fund II
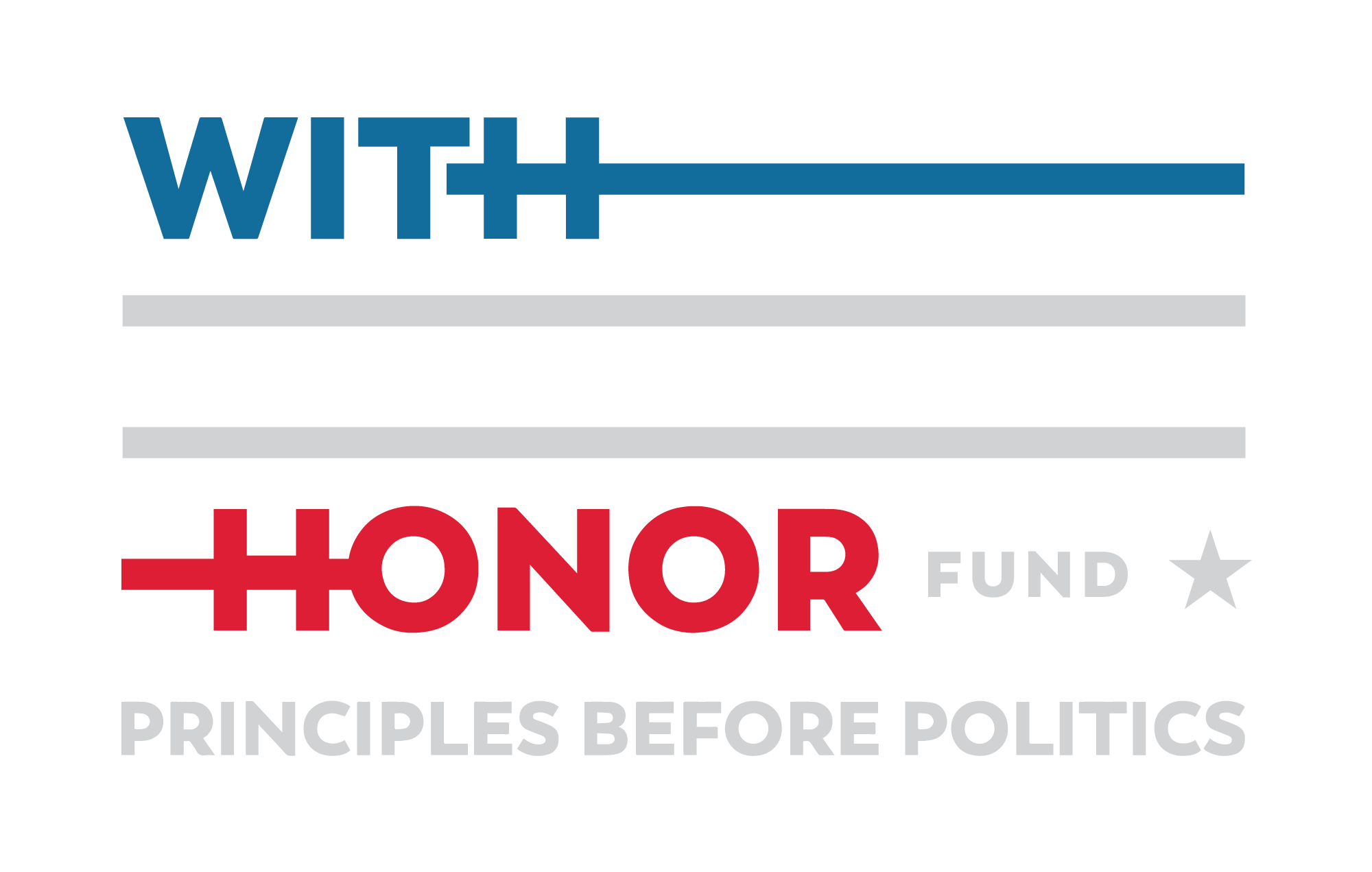
- Formation: 2017
- Founder: Rye Barcott, David Gergen, Peter Dixon
- Type: Super PAC
- Headquarters: Charlotte, North Carolina, U.S.
- Affiliations: With Honor Action; With Honor PAC
- Website: WithHonorfundii.org

With Honor Fund II (the next iteration of the With Honor Fund) is an American independent expenditure-only committee (also known as a Super PAC) registered with the Federal Election Commission whose self-stated goal is to elect more military veterans to office.

== History ==
Rye Barcott, David Gergen, Peter Dixon, and other veterans co-founded With Honor Fund in 2017 to support a surge of more than 150 younger veterans who answered the call to serve again and ran for U.S. House of Representative seats from both parties in 2018. With the help of With Honor Fund, 19 military veterans, nine Republicans, and ten Democrats won elections to the U.S. House.

In 2024, Dixon ran for the U.S. House in California's 16th congressional district. He placed fifth in the nonpartisan blanket primary with 8.1% of the vote despite raising the most of all candidates— $2,792,923 including $1.4 million in self-funding. The With Honor Fund's affiliated super PAC was dissolved in September 2023 and its associated funding transferred to a new super PAC called 'Next Generation Veteran Fund' which supported Dixon.

=== Fundraising ===
Before being dissolved in September 2023, The With Honor Fund Super PAC received $10 million in donations from Amazon-founder Jeff Bezos; Mike and Jacklyn Bezos also donated $2 million each; $500,000 from Walmart's Walton family; and $750,000 from Michael Bloomberg.
