= Ginetti =

Ginetti is an Italian surname.

== List of people with the surname ==
- Giovanni Francesco Ginetti (1626–1691), Italian bishop
- Marzio Ginetti (1585–1671), Italian cardinal
- Nadia Ginetti (born 1969), Italian politician

== See also ==
- Ginette (disambiguation)
