= Barcott =

Barcott is a surname. Notable people with the surname include:

- Bruce Barcott (born 1966), American editor, environmental journalist, and author
- Rye Barcott (born 1979), American social entrepreneur, investor, and author
