= Amanda Carter =

Australian wheelchair basketball player (born 1964)

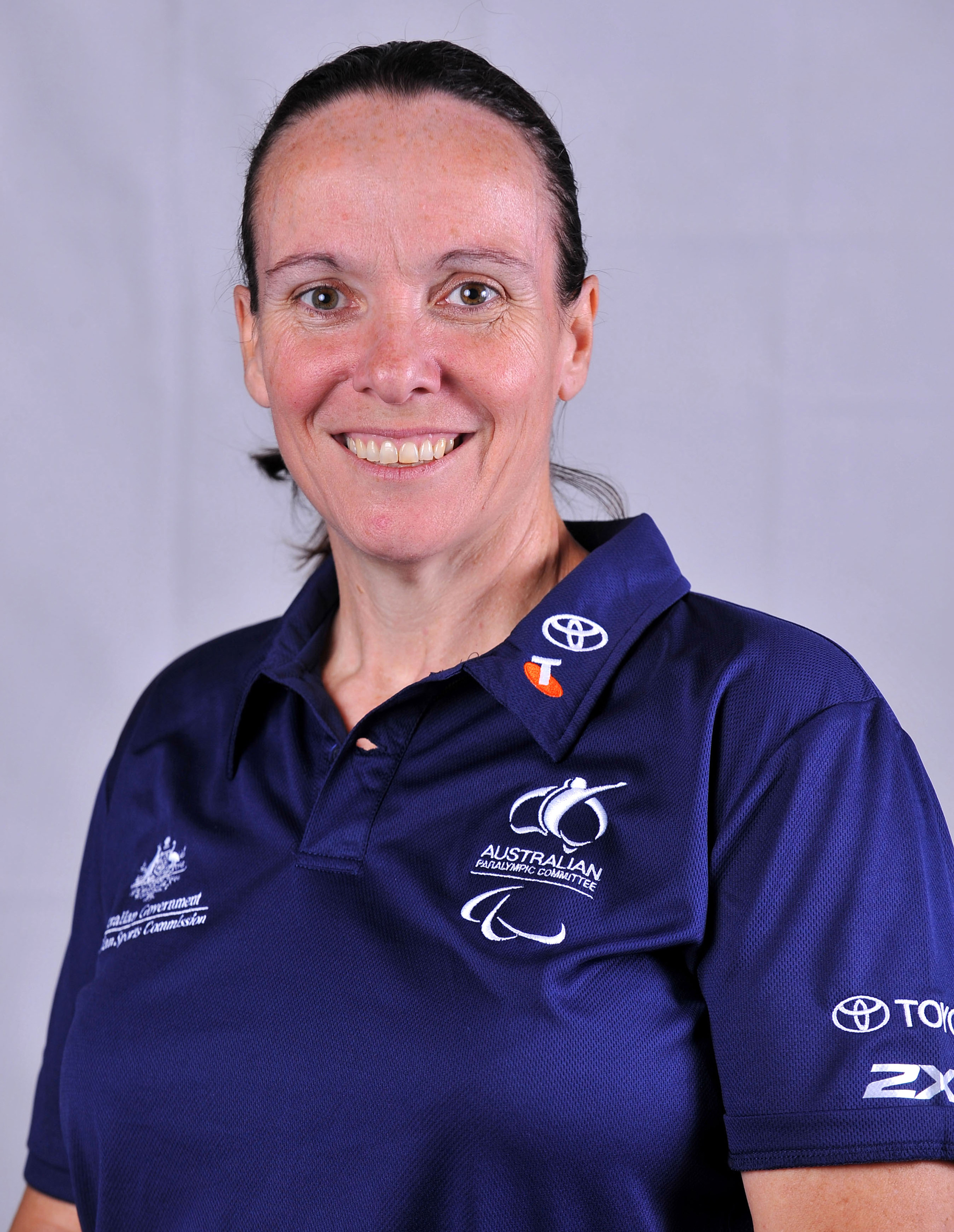
- 2012 Australian Paralympic team portrait of Carter

Personal information
- Born: 16 July 1964 (age 61) Melbourne, Victoria, Australia

Sport
- Country: Australia
- Sport: Wheelchair basketball
- Disability class: 1.0
- Event: Women's team
- Club: Dandenong Rangers
Medal record
Wheelchair basketball
Paralympic Games
Silver medal – second place	2000 Sydney	Women's wheelchair basketball
Silver medal – second place	2012 London	Women's wheelchair basketball
Wheelchair Basketball World Championship
Bronze medal – third place	1994	Women's wheelchair basketball
Bronze medal – third place	1998	Women's wheelchair basketball

Amanda Carter (born 16 July 1964) is an Australian Paralympic wheelchair basketball player. Diagnosed with transverse myelitis at the age of 24, she began playing wheelchair basketball in 1991 and participated in the Australia women's national wheelchair basketball team, the Gliders, at three Paralympics from 1992 to 2000. An injury in 2000 forced her to withdraw from the sport, but she came back to the national team in 2009, and was a member of the team that represented Australia and won silver at the 2012 London Paralympics.

Due to her 2000 injury, Carter lost considerable mobility in her right arm, and required an elbow reconstruction. She spent 11 weeks on a continuous passive motion machine, and nine operations were required to treat the elbow. After her comeback in 2008, she played for the Dandenong Rangers in the Australian Women's National Wheelchair Basketball League (WNWBL), the team she had played for before her injury. That year she received a player award from the Dandenong Rangers and was named the Most Valuable Player (MVP) in her 1-point disability classification in the WNWBL and was named to the league's All Star Five. The Rangers won back-to-back WNWBL titles in 2011 and 2012, and she was again named the WNWBL MVP 1 Pointer and to the league's All Star Five in 2012.

== Personal life ==
An interview with Amanda Carter in September 2012

Carter was born on 16 July 1964 in Heidelberg, Victoria. She spent her childhood living in the Melbourne suburb of Heidelberg West. She went to Olympic Village Primary School, attended years 7 to 10 at Latrobe High School and years 11 and 12 at Thornbury High School. She then entered La Trobe University, where she obtained Bachelor of Applied Science and Master of Occupational Therapy degrees. As a youngster, she played netball. In 1989, at the age of 24, she was diagnosed with transverse myelitis after a bout of chicken pox. She works as an occupational therapist and has a son, Alex. As of 2012, she still lives in Heidelberg West.

== Wheelchair basketball ==
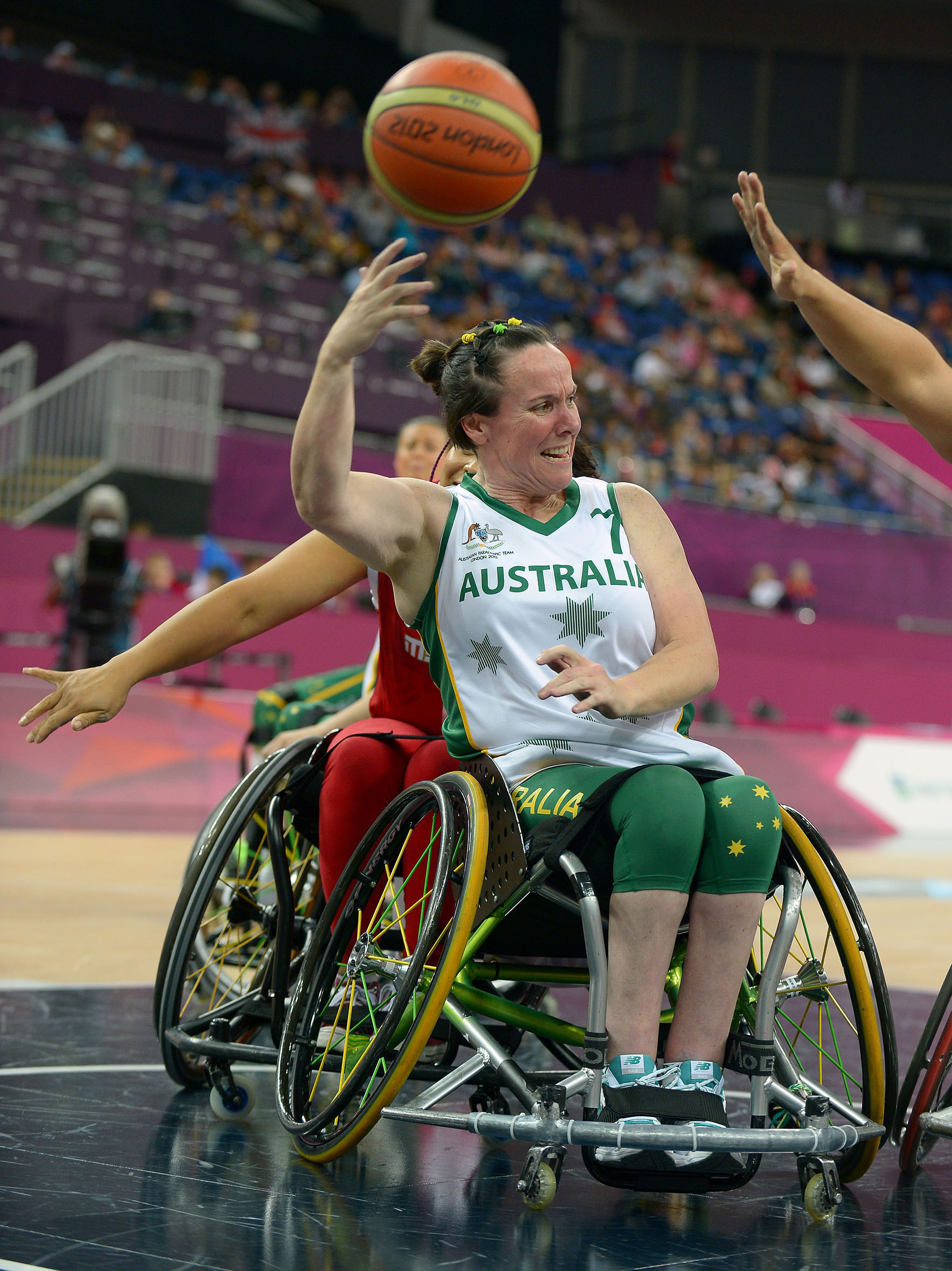
Carter at the 2012 London Paralympics

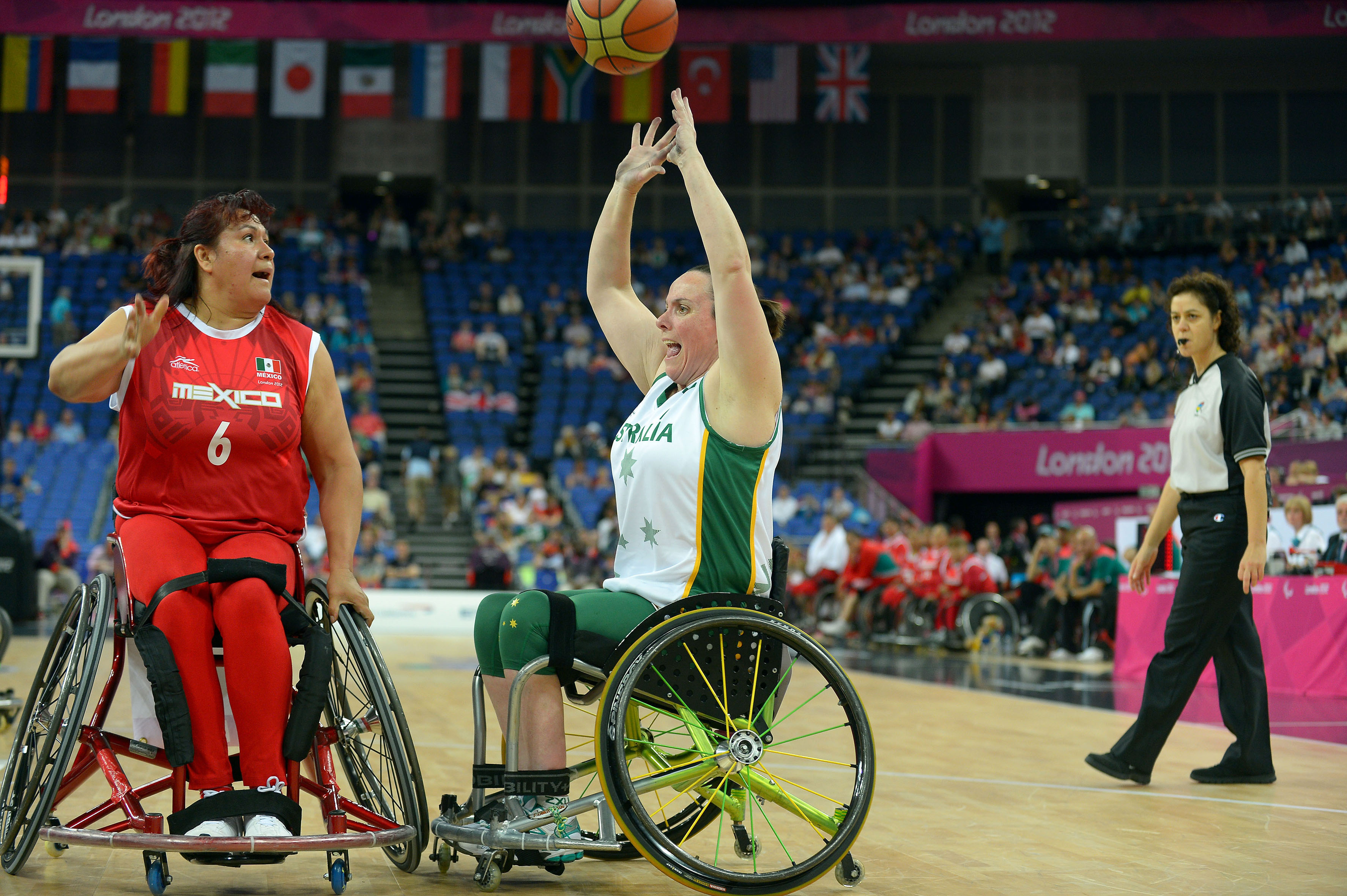
Carter at the 2012 London Paralympics

Carter began playing wheelchair basketball in 1991 as part of her rehabilitation. She is a guard, and 1 point player. Before her 2000 accident, she was a 2 point player.

She has been supported by the Australian Sports Commission's Direct Athlete Support (DAS) program with $5,571 in 2009/2010, $17,000 in both 2010/2011 and 2011/2012, and $10,000 in 2012/2013. In 2012, she trained at Aqualink-Box Hill, Royal Talbot Rehab Centre, Kew, and YMCA, Kew.

=== National team ===
Carter first participated in the Australia women's national wheelchair basketball team, known as the Gliders, in 1992 in a precursor tournament before the 1992 Barcelona Paralympics, in which she also participated. She was a member of the team that won a bronze medal at the 1994 World Championships. At the 1996 Atlanta Paralympics, her team finished fourth, losing to the United States 41–30 in the bronze medal game at the Omni in front of a crowd of 5,033. Carter led Australia in scoring with 12 points in that game.

In 1998, she won a bronze medal with the team at the World Championships. She participated at the 1998 Gold Cup in Sydney, where she was Australia's second-leading scorer with 30 points. In the year and a half before the start of the 2000 Summer Paralympics, she played in a number of test series with the team, including a five series in July 2000 in Sydney where Australia had 2 wins and 3 losses. The two Australian wins were the first time Canada had lost in ten years. She also participated in five game test series against the Netherlands, the United States and Japan where her team won all games in those series. In the team's 52–50 win over Canada in one of those games, she scored a layup with 16 seconds left in the match that brought the score to 51–50.

She won a silver medal as part of her team at the 2000 Sydney Paralympics. She missed a warm up game against the New South Wales State team before the start of the 2000 Games. Carter missed a practice game that her team played against Germany's women's wheelchair basketball team because of an illness she picked up during a team training camp at the Australian Institute of Sport that took place a week before the start of the Games. Half of her team had respiratory infections before the start of the Paralympics. She did not attend the opening ceremonies. During group play at the games, she scored 12 points in a 38–26 victory against the Netherlands, which was the most points she had ever scored in an international match. At one point, she made four baskets in a row. Her team made the gold medal game after beating Japan by a score of 45–33. Going into the gold medal game, Carter had missed the previous day's training session, and had an elbow injury. Her team lost the match to Canada before a crowd of 16,389 spectators, with Carter scoring only four points in the first half.

During the match, she was knocked onto her right side, and her right arm became trapped underneath her wheelchair, causing a tendon in her elbow to rupture. Tracey Ferguson, the Canadian player who knocked her down tried to block the way for Australian officials to help her up. Carter lost considerable mobility in her right arm, and required an elbow reconstruction. She spent 11 weeks on a continuous passive motion machine getting treatment. Nine operations were required to treat the elbow. Because she had a pre-existing condition, the insurance company refused to pay for her treatment, although it paid her $7,500 in return for agreeing not to take legal action. Carter carried a lot of anger towards the Canadian in the first year following her accident. By 2004, she still could not fully flex her hand. Following her accident, she occasionally required the use of an electric wheelchair because of the severity of her injury, and needed the assistance of the council's Home Care to clean her home. Before 2000, she had mostly been coached by national team coach Peter Corr.

She was selected to play in a four-game test series in Canberra against Japan's wheelchair basketball team held in March 2002, the first Australian hosted international for the team since the 2000 Summer Paralympics, and at the 2002 World Cup event in Japan, but did not do so. She quit the sport after being told that neither insurance nor the Australian Paralympic Committee would cover her against injury during a tour in the United States, as her tendonitis was considered an uninsured pre-condition there, and she would have to pay the costs for injury treatment herself. She quit wheelchair basketball. She had a child, which caused a recurrence of her original illness.

She took up wheelchair basketball again after watching the national team compete at the 2008 Beijing Paralympics. This re-ignited her interest in playing the sport competitively. She returned to the Gliders in 2009. That year, she competed in the Four Nations competition in Canada, one of six players who played for the Dandenong Rangers in the WNWBL. She also participated in the Japan Friendly Series. She was selected to participate in a national team training camp in 2010. In 2010, she was part of the gold medal-winning team at the Osaka Cup, one of six Victorians to be selected. In a 2012 friendly series against Japan, she played in three games, where she averaged 0.7 points per game, 1.0 assists per game and 1.0 rebounds per game. She played in four games during the 2012 Gliders World Challenge, where she averaged 1.5 points per game, 0.5 assists per game, and 1.3 rebounds per game. She was coached by John Triscari in 2012 when with the national team.

She was part of the silver medal team for the 2012 Summer Paralympics in London. She was the oldest member of the team, and the only member of the Gliders who had participated in the 1992, 1996 or 2000 Paralympics. She played in the first match against Brazil, in which the Australian team won 52–50, but sat out the second and third matches, returning to the field for her team's quarterfinal 62–37 victory over Mexico, in which she played 18:38 minutes and scored 5 points. She did not play in either the semifinal match against the United States, which Australia won, nor in the gold medal match against the Germany, which her team lost.

=== Club ===
In 2000, she played for the Whittlesea City Pacers in the National Wheelchair Basketball League. She played for Victoria in the inaugural Women's National Wheelchair Basketball League (WNWBL) completion in 2000 when they finished first in the final after they defeated the Hills Hornets 51–50. At the half, her team was winning by 10 points, with Carter being a major reason why.

From 2008 to 2012, she played for the Dandenong Rangers in the WNWBL, the team she had played for before her injury. That year she received a player award from the Dandenong Rangers and was named the Most Valuable Player (MVP) in her 1-point disability classification in the WNWBL and was named to the league's All Star Five. In 2009, she played 17 games for the Rangers where she averaged 5.1 points per game. She averaged 2.4 assists and 3.5 rebounds per game that year. In 2010, she played 4 games, and averaged 3.0 points per game. She averaged 0.3 assists and 3.0 rebounds per game that year. In 2011, she played in 18 games where she averaged 4.7 points per game. She averaged 1.3 assists and 2.1 rebounds per game that year. The Rangers won back-to-back WNWBL titles in 2011 and 2012. In 2012, and was again named the WNWBL MVP 1 Pointer and to the league's All Star Five. She played 13 games that season, when she averaged 4.5 points, 1.5 assists and 2.8 rebounds per game.

== Gallery ==
Amanda Carter
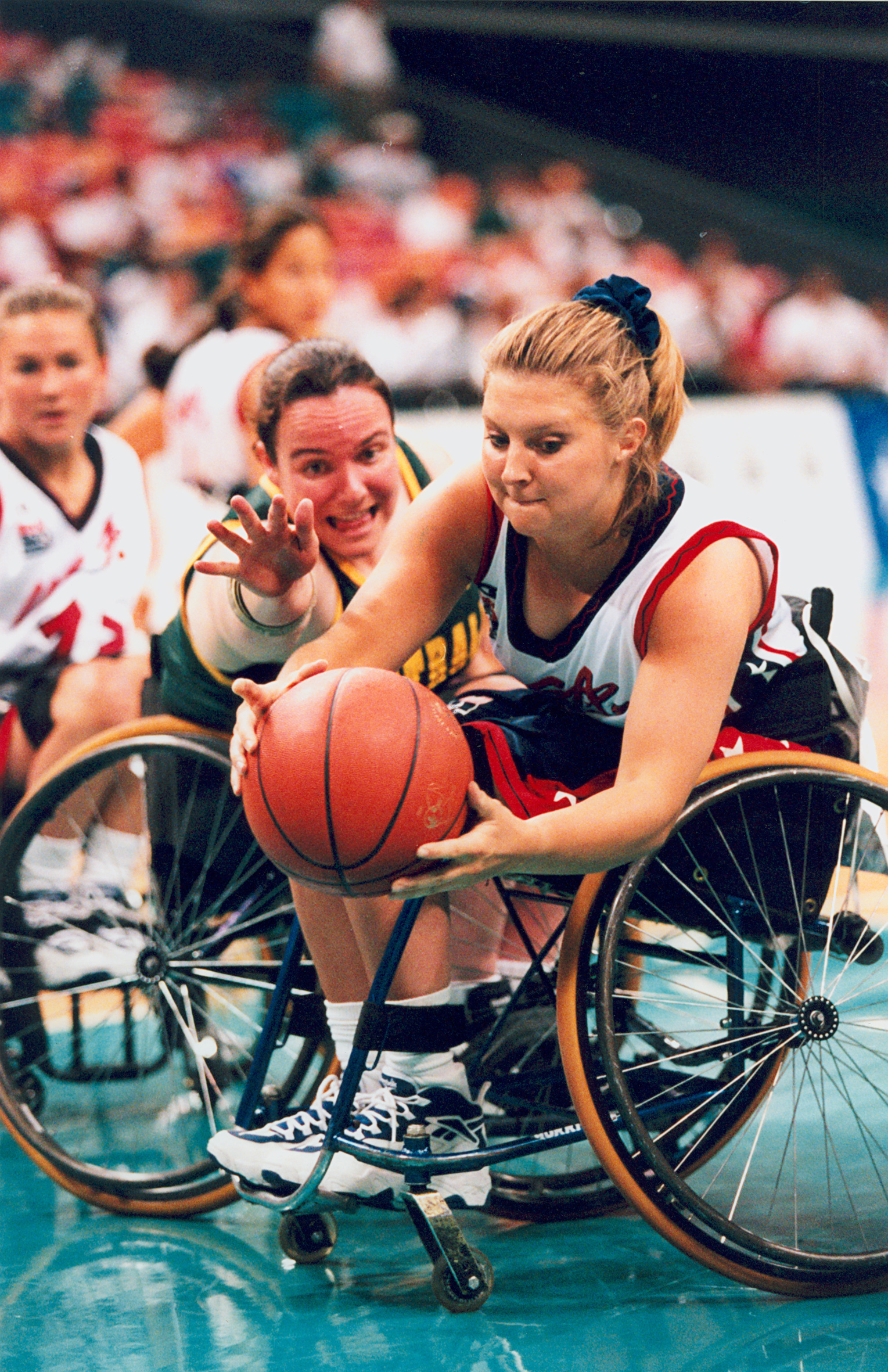
Carter challenging for the ball in a game against the USA at the 1996 Atlanta Paralympics

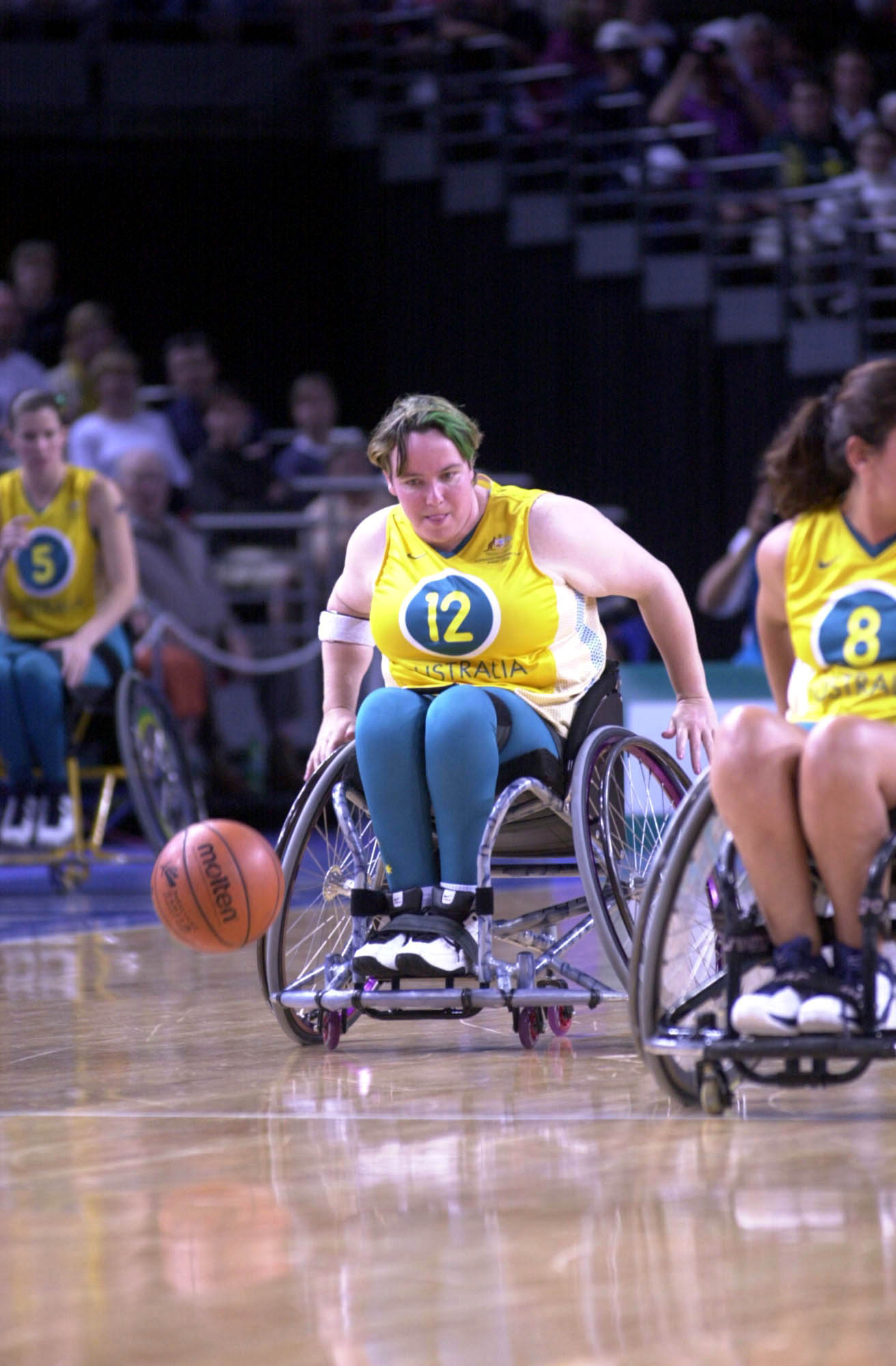
Carter on the attack during competition at the 2000 Sydney Paralympics

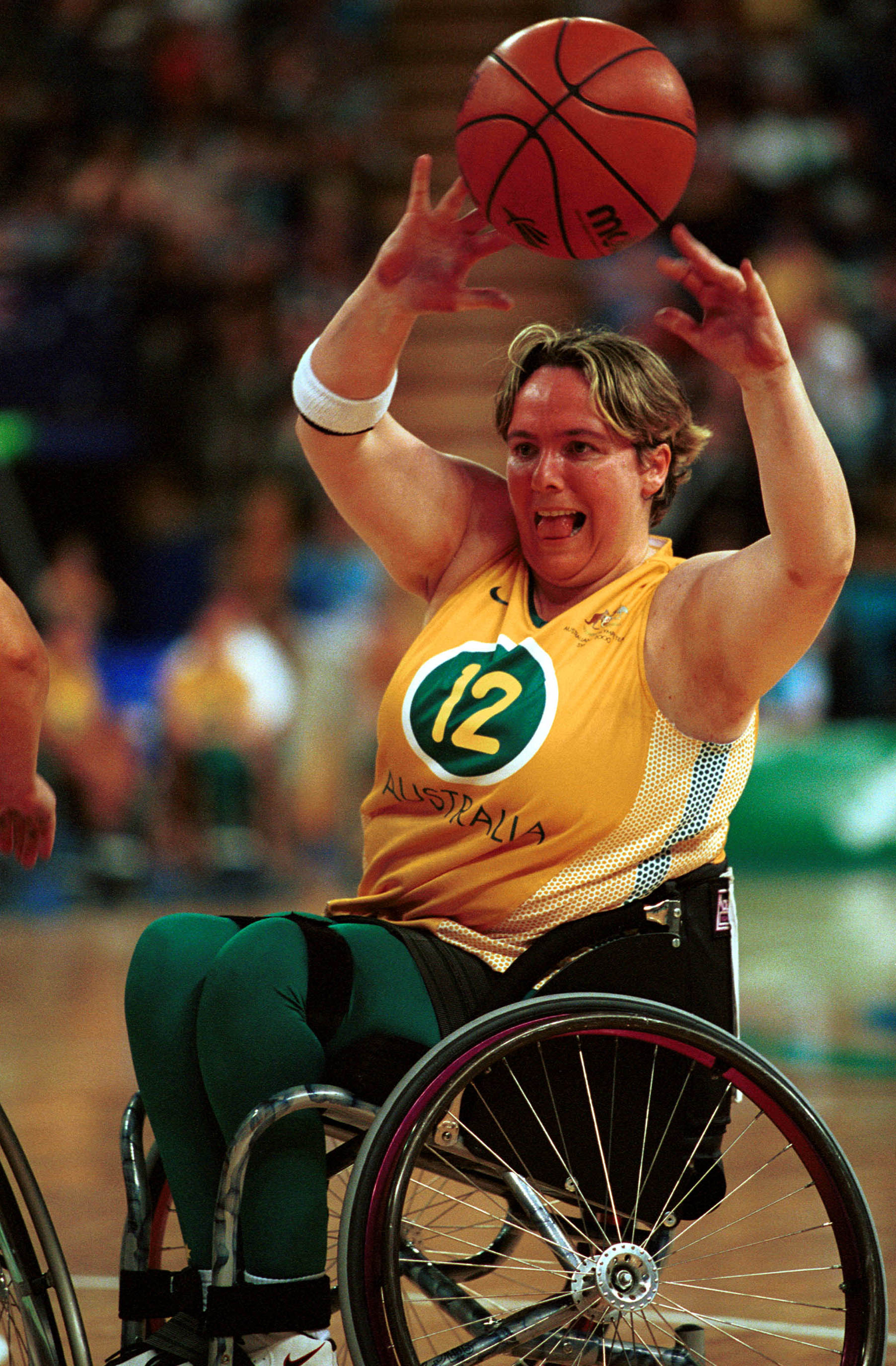
Carter with the ball during a 2000 Sydney Paralympic Games match

== Statistics ==
WNWBL Season statistics
Competition	Season	M	FGM–A	FG%	3PM–A	3P%	FTM–A	FT%	TOT	AST	PTS
WNWBL	2009	17	38–117	32.5	1	0.0	10–21	47.6	3.5	2.4	5.1
WNWBL	2010	4	6–13	46.2	0	0.0	0–0	0.0	3.0	0.3	3.0
WNWBL	2011	18	42–81	51.9	0	0.0	1–3	33.3	2.1	1.3	4.7
WNWBL	2012	13	29–63	46.0	0	0.0	0–0	0.0	2.8	1.5	4.5

Key
FGM, FGA, FG%: field goals made, attempted and percentage	3FGM, 3FGA, 3FG%: three-point field goals made, attempted and percentage
FTM, FTA, FT%: free throws made, attempted and percentage	PF: personal fouls
Pts, PTS: points, average per game	TOT: turnovers average per game, AST: assists average per game
