= CFK =

CFK may refer to:

- CFK Africa
- Chefornak Airport, Alaska, US, FAA LID code
- Compagnie de Chemin de fer du Katanga, a former Belgian Congo railway company
- Chemische Fabrik Kalk, a former German chemical company
- Cristina Fernández de Kirchner, President of Argentina from 2007 to 2015 and Vice President of Argentina from 2019 to 2023
- Carbonfaserverstärkte Kunststoffe (CFK or CFvK), which translates to carbon fiber reinforced polymer (CFRP)
