= Ullyett =

Ullyett is a surname. Notable people with the surname include:

- Jeanette Ullyett (born 1986), New Zealand cricketer
- Kevin Ullyett (born 1972), Zimbabwean tennis player
- Robert Ullyett (1936–2004), Rhodesian cricketer

== See also ==
- Ulyett
