= J. William Fulbright Foreign Scholarship Board =

Supervises the Fulbright Program

Agency overview
- Parent department: U.S. Department of State Bureau of Educational and Cultural Affairs
- Website: https://www.state.gov/fulbright-foreign-scholarship-board/

The J. William Fulbright Foreign Scholarship Board was established by the United States Congress for the purpose of supervising the Fulbright Program and certain programs authorized by the Fulbright-Hays Act.

== Operation ==
Appointed by the President of the United States, the 12-member Board meets quarterly. The Board issues an annual report on the state of the Program. The Board maintains a close relationship with both the Bureau of Educational and Cultural Affairs (ECA) of the United States Department of State and the executive directors of all the binational Fulbright Commissions.

Eleven of the twelve members of the Fulbright Foreign Scholarship Board resigned on June 11, 2025, claiming that the Trump administration "usurped the authority of the Board and denied Fulbright awards to a substantial number of individuals who were selected for the 2025-2026 academic year." In response, an official from the State Department contended the resignations were nothing "but a political stunt attempting to undermine President Trump."

=== Current board ===
Since June 2025, the only member of the board is Carmen Estrada-Schaye who has been a member since 2022 and is the President of Historic Homes Restoration.

== Notable past members ==
- Birch Bayh, former U.S. Senator (D-IN), (1995–2007)
- Omar Bradley, Administrator of Veterans Affairs, (1947)
- James Costos, former U.S. Ambassador to the Kingdom of Spain and Principality of Andorra, (2022–2025)
- Jen O'Malley Dillon, former political strategist, (2024–2025)
- Frederick L. Hovde, president, Purdue University, (1951–1955)
- Charles S. Johnson, president, Fisk University, (1947–1954)
- Walter Johnson, chairman, Department of History, University of Chicago, (1947–1954)
- Martin R. P. McGuire, professor of Greek and Latin, Catholic University of America(1947–1954)
- David Price, President of the American Institute for Economic Research, (2023–2025)
- Vinay Reddy, speechwriter, (until 2025)
- Louisa Terrell, lawyer, (until 2025)
- Helen C. White, professor of English, University of Wisconsin, (1947–1954)
- Philip Willkie, attorney, Rushville, Indiana, (1953–1958)
- Rye Barcott, co-founder and CEO of With Honor (2012)
