= Alice Viola Guysi =

American painter (1863–1940)

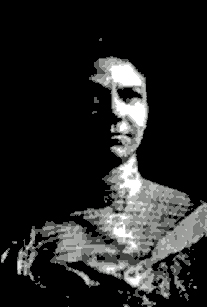
- Born: March 15, 1863; Cincinnati, Ohio
- Died: March 23, 1940 (aged 77); Birmingham, Michigan
- Known for: Painting, Educator

Alice Viola Guysi (1863–1940) was an American painter who served as the Director of Art in the Detroit Public Schools for over three decades. Her younger sister Jeanette Guysi mirrored her career in painting and teaching.

== Biography ==
Guysi was born on March 15, 1863, in Cincinnati. She studied with William Sartain at the National Academy of Design in New York City, then traveled with her sister, Jeanette, to Paris, France, where she studied at the Académie Colarossi

In 1891 and 1892 Guysi exhibited her painting at the Paris Salon. She exhibited her work at the Woman's Building at the 1893 World's Columbian Exposition in Chicago, Illinois. She also exhibited her work at the Detroit Institute of Art.

Guysi taught in the Detroit Public Schools from 1903 through 1934, and served as the Director of Art in the Detroit Public Schools for 31 years. Guysi also taught pastel and miniature painting at the Detroit Museum of Art.

Guysi died on March 23, 1940, in Birmingham, Michigan.
