= Jeanetta =

Jeanetta can refer to:

- Jeanetta, Houston, Texas
- Jeanetta, a variation of the given name Jeanette
