= Janette =

Janette may refer to:

== People ==
- Janette Ahrens (1925–2016), American figure skater
- Janette Barber (born 1953), American comedian, television producer and writer
- Janette Hales Beckham (1933–2022), general president of the LDS Young Women Organization
- Janette Beckman (born 1959), English photographer
- Jan Brittin (1959–2017), English cricketer born Janette Ann Brittin
- Janette Carter (1923–2006), American country musician
- Janette Anne Dimech (born 1951), Spanish singer who uses the stage name Jeanette
- Janette Garin (born 1972), Filipino politician
- Janette Geri (1961–2018), Australian singer-songwriter
- Janette Turner Hospital (born 1942), Australian writer
- Janette Howard (born 1944), wife of the 25th Prime Minister of Australia
- Janette Husárová (born 1974), Slovak tennis player
- Janette Hill Knox (1845–1920), American reformer, suffragist, teacher, author
- Janette Luu (born 1976), television broadcaster
- Janette McBride (born 1983), Filipino-Australian actress
- Janette Manrara (born 1983), Cuban-American dancer and presenter
- Janette Oke (born 1935), Canadian writer
- Janette Rallison (born 1966), American writer
- Janette Sadik-Khan (born 1960), Commissioner of the New York City Department of Transportation
- Janette Scott (born 1938), English actress

== Characters ==
- Janette du Charme, a character in the television series Forever Knight

== Places ==
- Janette Lake, Minnesota, U.S.

== See also ==
- Janet (disambiguation)
- Jeanette (given name)
