= Ginette Gosselin Ferszt =

American nurse

- Education: University of Pennsylvania School of Nursing (M.S.N.); University of Rhode Island (Ph.D.)
- Scientific career
- Workplaces: University of Rhode Island
- Thesis: Studies of Grief: narratives of incarcerated women who experienced the death of a significant person while in prison (2000)
- Doctoral advisor: Donna Schwartz-Barcott
- Other academic advisors: Hesook Suzie Kim

Ginette Gosselin Ferszt is an American nurse. She is a professor of nursing and the coordinator of the graduate psychiatric mental health clinical nurse specialist program at University of Rhode Island.

== Early life and education ==
Ferszt was born to Fernand and Georgette LeBreton Gosselin. She has a sister and brother who was a priest. Ferszt earned an M.S.N. from University of Pennsylvania School of Nursing in 1978. She completed a Ph.D. in nursing at University of Rhode Island (URI) in 2000. Her doctoral advisor was Donna Schwartz-Barcott. Her dissertation was titled Studies of Grief: narratives of incarcerated women who experienced the death of a significant person while in prison. Hesook Suzie Kim was her major advisor.

== Career ==
Ferszt is a professor of nursing and the coordinator of the graduate psychiatric mental health clinical nurse specialist program at URI. She has a clinical practice at a Rhode Island Department of Corrections women's facility. Ferszt teaches courses in nursing research, nursing leadership in health policy, and qualitative research methods. Since 2009, she has become involved with the Rebecca Project for Human Rights.

== Personal life ==
As of 2000, was married and had 2 children.

== Awards and honors ==
In 2017, Ferszt became a fellow of the American Academy of Nursing.
