= Ulyett =

Ulyett is a surname. Notable people with the surname include:

- George Ulyett (1851–1898), English cricketer
- Jocelyn Ulyett (born 1995), English swimmer

== See also ==
- Ullyett
