= Kathleen McGinn =

American economist

Kathleen L. McGinn is an American economist currently the Cahners-Rabb Professor of Business Administration at Harvard Business School. She currently serves on the global Advisory Council for CFK Africa, a leading NGO working in Kenyan informal settlements.
