= Jeanette =

Jeanette, Jeannette or Jeanetta may refer to:

== Places ==
- Jeannette, Ontario, Canada
- Jeannette Runciman Island, Ontario, Canada
- Jeannette Island, Russia
- Jeannette, Pennsylvania, U.S.
- Jeannette Monument, United States Naval Academy Cemetery, Annapolis, Maryland, U.S.
- Jeanette State Forest, Minnesota, U.S.

== People ==
=== Given name ===
- Jeanette (given name), a given name (including a list of people and fictional characters with the name)
- Jeanette (Spanish singer) (born 1951), Spanish singer
- Jeanette Biedermann, a German singer known mononymously by "Jeanette"
- Jeanne Brousse (1921– 2017), a member of the French Resistance during WWII known as Jeannette

=== Surname ===
- Buddy Jeannette (1917–1998), basketball player and coach
- Daniel Jeannette (born 1961), director of animation and FX
- Gertrude Jeannette (1914-2018), actress
- Gunnar Jeannette (born 1982), racecar driver
- Joe Jeanette (1879–1958), heavyweight boxer
- Stanick Jeannette (born 1977), figure skater

== Other uses ==
- Jeannette: The Childhood of Joan of Arc, 2017 French film
- Jeannette (comics), a DC Comics character
- USS Jeannette (1878), Arctic exploration vessel, converted warship
- USS Jeannette (SP-149), a USN patrol craft in WWI
- "Jeanette", a song by the Beat from Special Beat Service
- "Jeanette", a song by Kelly Lee Owens from her album Inner Song.

== See also ==
- Madame Jeanette, chili pepper cultivar
- Olive Jeanette, a 24-foot launch built in 1926
- Genelia D'Souza (born 1987), Indian actress
