= Jeanetta, Houston =

Coordinates: 29.7200°N 95.5236°W

Jeanetta is an area of Houston, Texas, United States that used to be a distinct unincorporated community in Harris County.

== History ==
Jeanetta was located on the Texas and New Orleans Railroad. According to a 1936 county highway map two schools and a church were near the townsite during that year. In the 1990s the community was no longer listed on county highway maps. An abandoned railroad was located at that site during that decade.

== Government and infrastructure ==
On Wednesday September 19, 1990, the Houston City Council approved a measure to spend $907 United States dollars per month to establish a police storefront in Jeanetta. The real estate company of the complex including the storefront charged the city an annual rate of $1 per month. Christian Hartung, a representative whose district included Jeanetta, said that area residents were "afraid to go out after dark."

== Education ==
Jeanetta is within the Houston Independent School District
