= Jeannette H. Lee =

Korean-American businessman

- Born: Seoul, South Korea
- Occupation: Entrepreneur

Jeannette H. Lee (born in Seoul, South Korea) is a Korean–American entrepreneur based in Washington, D.C., and later in Kansas City, Missouri. Lee was also known for several years under the married name Jeannette Lee White.

== Early life ==
Lee moved with her family from Seoul, South Korea, to the United States at age 12. They moved first to Hawaii, and settled in Bethesda, Maryland, when she was 14. Her first work experience was there, in her father's convenience store.

== Career ==
Lee founded the information-technology and government-contracting company Sytel, serving as its president and chief executive officer (CEO) from its inception in 1987, originally as Tasque Inc., in Gaithersburg, Maryland. She took no salary for the first four years and financed the company with personal credit-card debt, but grew it to 275 employees and approximately US$40 million in revenue by 2001. She continued in her dual-title role after Sytel was acquired in 2005 by TechTeam Global (later itself acquired by Jacobs Engineering Group). Sytel's early-2000s major governmental clients for systems integration work included the National Institutes of Health, Department of Agriculture, and Federal Emergency Management Agency. The sale to TechTeam netted an $18.5 million profit, split with her by then ex-husband.

Lee has been a governor-appointed board member of the Maryland Technology Development Corporation and a member of the High Tech Council of Maryland.

In 2016, Lee became the CEO of MoboTour, a workforce-reporting software company headquartered in Kansas City, Missouri.

In April 2018, Lee became the CEO of Information International Associates (IIa), a company involved in enterprise IT and data management, Big data analytics, open-source data exploitation, and information security and threat intelligence.

=== Awards ===
Lee received a triple National Entrepreneurial Excellence Award (a national award in the "Innovative Business Strategies" category and two regional ones, in "General Excellence" and again in "Innovative Business Strategies") from Working Woman magazine in 2000. Washingtonian magazine listed her among the US capital city's "100 Most Powerful Women" in 2001, and received the Executive of the Year award from the High Tech Council of Maryland the same year. She was also named among the "Top 100 Greatest Entrepreneurs in America" of 1998 by Success magazine. Under her leadership, Sytel appeared on Inc. magazine's annual "Fastest Growing Private Companies in America" list five times, and was inducted into the Inc. Hall of Fame in 1999.
