= Ginette Bouchard =

Canadian photographer

Ginette Bouchard (1952 – 2004) was a Canadian photographer. Bouchard was born in Quebec City, Quebec and died in Montreal, Quebec.

A posthumous exhibition of her work was presented in December 2004 at the University of Laval' Galerie des arts visuels in Quebec City. Her work is included in the collections of the National Gallery of Canada and the Musée national des beaux-arts du Québec.
