= USS Jeannette (SP-149) =

Patrol vessel of the United States Navy

History

United States
- Name: USS Jeannette
- Namesake: Previous name retained
- Builder: B. C. Huffstetler, Miami, Florida
- Completed: 1905
- Acquired: 14 May 1917
- Commissioned: 14 May 1917
- Decommissioned: 7 February 1919
- Fate: Sold 16 January 1920
- Notes: Operated as private motorboat Jeannette 1905-1917

General characteristics
- Type: Patrol vessel
- Tonnage: 17 tons
- Length: 49 ft (15 m)
- Beam: 13 ft (4.0 m)
- Draft: 4 ft (1.2 m)
- Speed: 9 knots
- Armament: 2 × machine guns

The second USS Jeannette (SP-149), sometimes spelled USS Jeanette, was a motorboat that served in the United States Navy as a patrol vessel from 1917 to 1919.

Jeannette was built as a civilian motorboat in 1905 by B. C. Huffstetler at Miami, Florida. The U.S. Navy acquired her on 14 May 1917 from her owner, B. A. Long of Beaufort, South Carolina, for use as a patrol vessel during World War I. She was commissioned the same day as USS Jeannette (SP-149).

Jeannette served as a patrol boat at Port Royal and Beaufort, South Carolina, with occasional duties at Pensacola, Florida, and in the Gulf of Mexico.

Jeannette was decommissioned on 7 February 1919. After that, she was used for a time in a non-commissioned status at the Marine Corps Recruit Depot Parris Island at Parris Island, South Carolina. She was sold on 16 January 1920 to the E. O. Hall boat yard at Charleston, South Carolina.
