= Donna Schwartz-Barcott =

American nurse and anthropologist (born 1944)

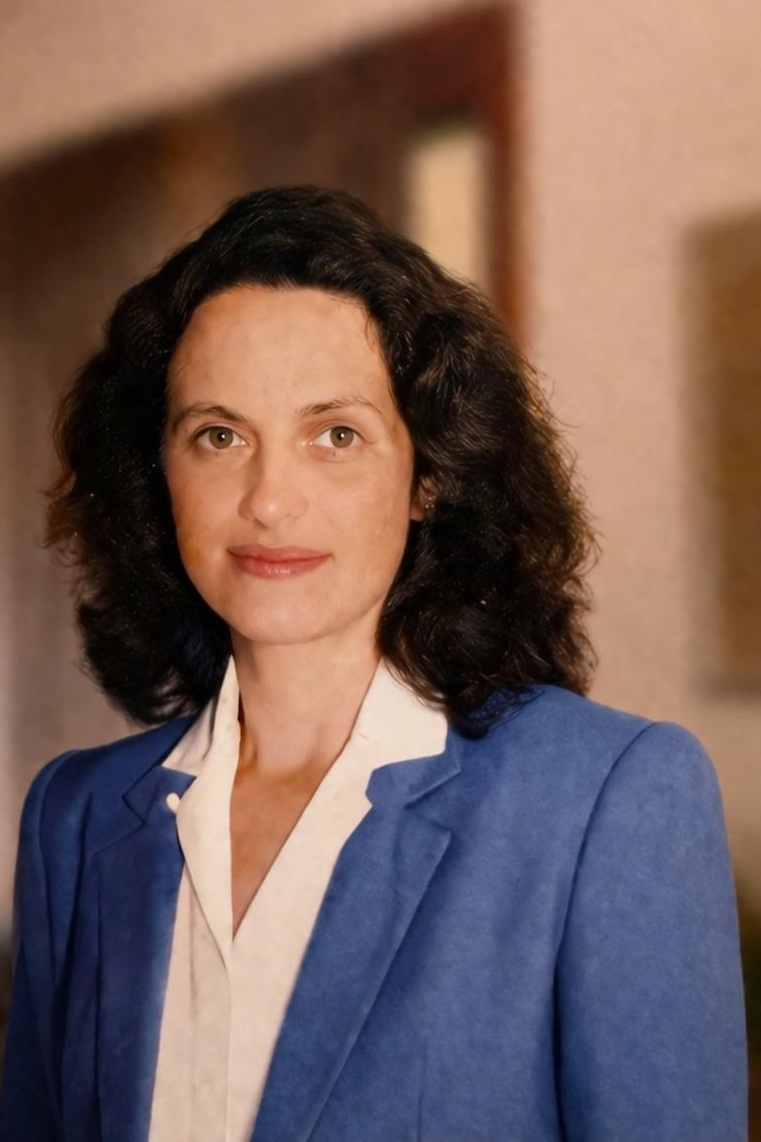
- Born: August 28, 1944 (age 82)

Academic background
- Education: University of Washington (BS); University of North Carolina (MS in Public Health, MA and PhD in Anthropology)
- Thesis: National family planning programs in developing nations: a theoretical and empirical examination of the adoption process. (1979)

Academic work
- Discipline: Nursing
- Institutions: University of Rhode Island

Donna Schwartz-Barcott (born August 28, 1944) is an American nurse and anthropologist. She is a professor emeritus of nursing at the University of Rhode Island. She helped establish and led the University of Rhode Island College of Nursing graduate degree programs.

== Early life and education ==
Schwartz-Barcott is the daughter of the late Dorothy Barcott Wallgren, a nurse, and Frank L. Barcott, an entrepreneur who owned the Barcott Paint Store in Everett, Washington. She graduated from Everett High School in 1962 and earned a B.S. in nursing from the University of Washington in 1966. Following graduation, she worked for a year as a community health nurse in rural Peru.

She completed an M.S. in public health and an M.A. and Ph.D. in anthropology at the University of North Carolina at Chapel Hill. Her 1978 dissertation was titled National family planning programs in developing nations: a theoretical and empirical examination of the adoption process.

== Career ==
Her academic career includes teaching and conducting nursing and anthropological research at institutions, including the University of North Carolina, the University of Delaware and University of Rhode Island.

In 2022 the University of Rhode Island created the Dr. Donna Schwartz-Barcott and Dr. Hesook Suzie Kim Nursing Fellowship for graduate-level research and professional development. The fellowship was highlighted by U.S. Senator Jack Reed in 2023 in connection with efforts to address the national nursing shortage. “We’re honoring two icons of nursing education, extraordinary educators who have had a huge impact, not just on URI, but on the entire nursing profession,” Senator Reed said.

Throughout her career, Schwartz-Barcott worked in healthcare delivery and nursing education in low-income communities in Rhode Island, North Carolina, Washington state, Peru, and Kenya.

== Research ==
Her research has focused on pain and anxiety experienced by patients across various nursing care settings. Her interest in community health and sociocultural influences on health and illness has driven much of her scholarly work.

Her scholarship extends to concept development and metatheoretical levels, aiming to expand the knowledge base of nursing practice.

== Personal life ==
She was married to Timothy Schwartz-Barcott. They have a son, Rye Barcott.
