= Jeannette Scalé =

Jeannette Scalé, née Jeannette Shepherd Hauser, known by her professional name, Mrs. Pomeroy (1862, Bijnor, Uttar Pradesh - India 1938) was a British entrepreneur.

== Life and career ==
She was the daughter of American missionaries Isaiah L. Hauser (1834–1909) and Jeannette Gallagher Shepherd (1840–1923). In 1889, she married the British civil servant William Henry Jobbins (1851–1893), with whom she had two children. In 1895, she married James Bernard Scalé (1867–1923).

She moved to London in 1893. Using funds from her late husband, she opened a business selling perfumes and cosmetics on Chancery Lane in May 1895, offering "hygienic" skin treatments. In 1896, she established Mrs. Pomeroy Ltd., a highly successful venture that came to dominate the cosmetics market among London's high society at the turn of the 20th century.
