= JenNet-IP =

Within computer networking, JenNet-IP software is an enhanced 6LoWPAN network layer for ultra-low-power 802.15.4 based wireless networking. Using a "mesh-under" networking approach, JenNet-IP is designed to enable the Internet of Things and can serve wireless networks in excess of 500 nodes.

In May 2011, NXP Semiconductors announced its intent to release JenNet-IP software, developed by wireless semiconductor company Jennic which it acquired in July 2010, under an open source license.
