= Jules Janet =

French physician (1861–1945)

- Born: 22 December 1861; Bourg-la-Reine (Hauts-de-Seine, France)
- Died: 1945 (aged 83–84)
- Scientific career
- Fields: Psychology, psychiatry

Jules Janet (French: [ʒyl ʒanɛ]; 22 December 1861 – 1945) was a French physician, psychologist and psychotherapist, best known today for his clinical contributions to psychological trauma as the cause of hysteria, a view shared with his brother Pierre.
