= Ginette (disambiguation) =

Ginette is a feminine given name and nickname. It may also refer to:

- Moderate Tropical Storm Ginette (1965)
- Cyclone Ginette (1971)
- Lycée privé Sainte-Geneviève, also known as Ginette, a private Catholic preparatory school in Versailles, France
- A brand name of ethinylestradiol/cyproterone acetate, an oral contraceptive
- "Ginette", a song by Beau Dommage
- "Ginette", a song by Têtes Raides
