= Ginette Bingguely-Lejeune =

French sculptor (1895-1969)

Bingguely-Lejeune in 1948 by Kay Vaughan

Ginette Bingguely-Lejeune born Georgette Lejeune (1895-1969) was a French sculptor known for her portrait busts of notable individuals.

== Biography ==
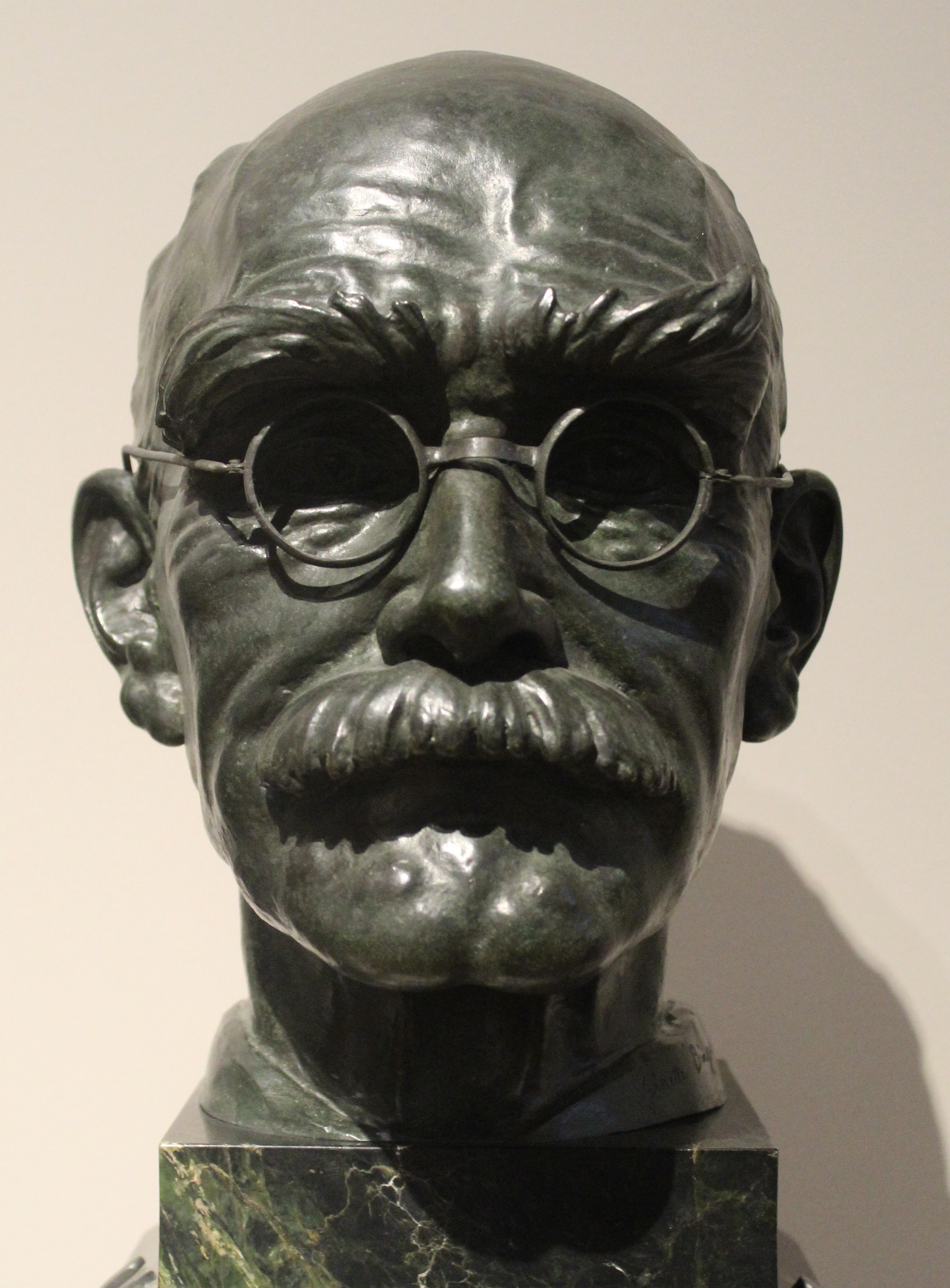
Bust of Rudyard Kipling, National Portrait Gallery, London

Bingguely-Lejeune was born and raised in Paris and studied under Jean-George Achard there before studying in London with Charles Doman. In 1923 she married Henry Bingguely at Kensington in London. The couple spent World War II in London. She was a life-long number of the Societe des Artistes Francais and exhibited regularly at the Paris Salon and at the Royal Academy in London. She also exhibited at the Fine Art Society, the Royal Glasgow Institute of the Fine Arts and with the Royal Society of British Artists. In 1948 Bingguely-Lejeune was awarded the Legion of Honour.

Bingguely-Lejeune's portrait bust of Rudyard Kipling is in the National Portrait Gallery, London and Nuffield College in Oxford holds her 1937 bust of Lord Nuffield. Other subjects included Haile Selassie and General de Gaulle. Her portrait of General Henri Guisan is held by the Museum of Fine Art in Lausanne.

She died at Corseaux in Switzerland.
