= Jeanette Guysi =

American painter

- Born: March 10, 1873; Cincinnati, Ohio
- Died: January 6, 1966 (aged 92); Birmingham, Michigan
- Known for: Painting, Educator

Jeanette Guysi (1873–1966) was an American painter who was principal of the Detroit Museum School of Art. Her career path followed that of her elder sister, Alice Viola Guysi.

== Biography ==
Guysi was born on March 10, 1873, in Cincinnati. She studied with William Sartain at the National Academy of Design in New York City, then traveled with her sister, Alice Viola Guysi, to Paris, France where she studied at the Académie Colarossi

In 1891 and 1892, Guysi exhibited her paintings at the Paris Salon. She exhibited her work at the Woman's Building at the 1893 World's Columbian Exposition in Chicago, Illinois. She also exhibited her work at the Art Institute of Chicago.

Guysi and her sister moved to Detroit in 1896. There, Jeanette served as principal of the Detroit Museum School of Art.

Guysi died on January 6, 1966, in Birmingham, Michigan.
