= CFK Africa =

Kenyan non-governmental organization

- Formation: 2001
- Founder: Rye Barcott, Salim Mohamed, and the late Tabitha Atieno Festo
- Type: NGO
- Purpose: CFK Africa empowers youth in slums.
- Headquarters: Kibera, Nairobi, Kenya
- Services: Public Health, Youth Development, Girls' Empowerment, Sports for Peace and Development
- Co-Founder & Board Chair: Rye Barcott
- Chief Executive Officer: Jeffrey Okoro
- Website: https://cfkafrica.org/
- Formerly called: Carolina for Kibera

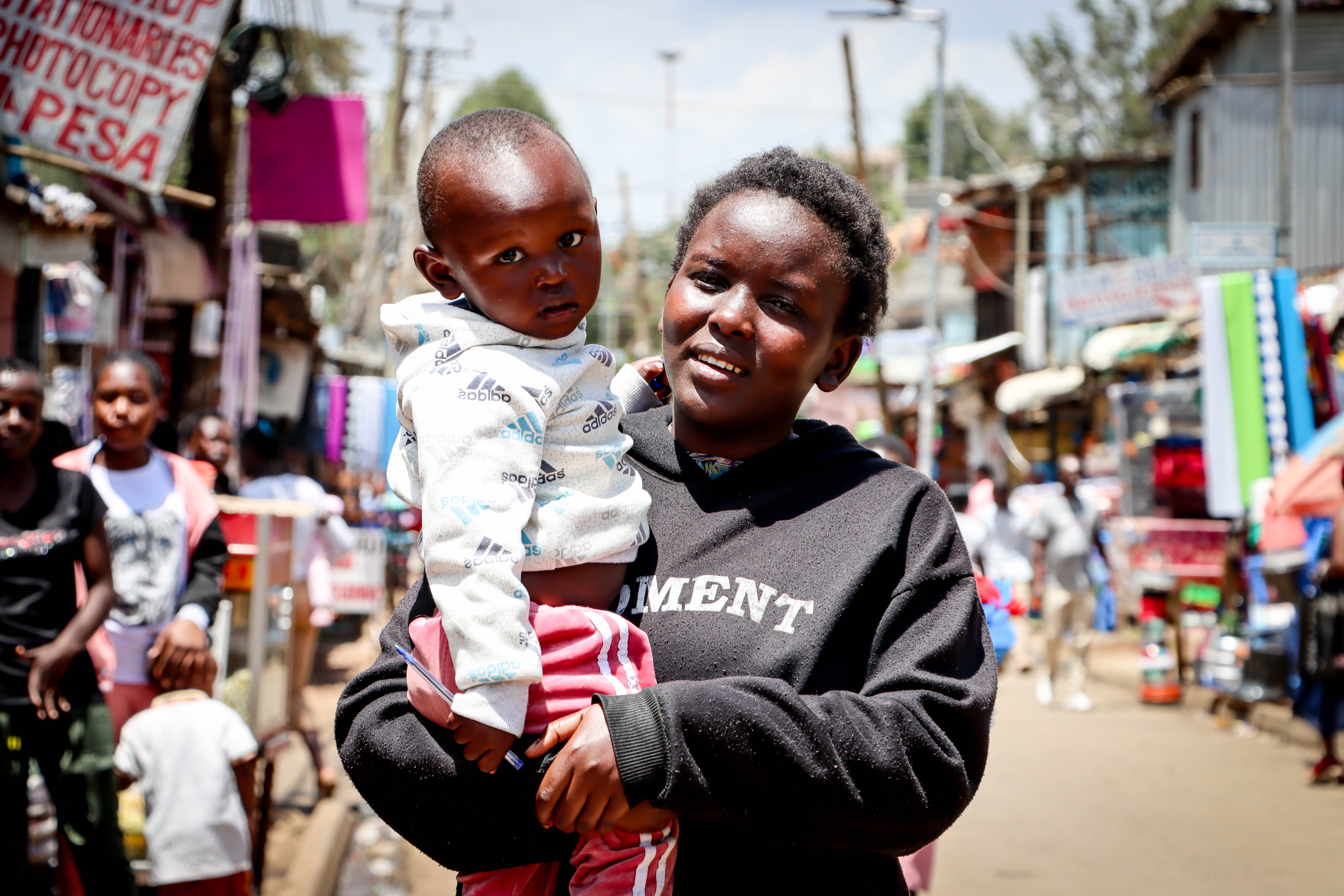
Teenage mother in Kibera, Kenya.

CFK Africa (previously Carolina for Kibera) was founded in 2001 by Rye Barcott, Salim Mohamed, and the late Tabitha Atieno Festo. CFK Africa is an international non-governmental organization (NGO) based in the informal settlement of Kibera in Nairobi, Kenya, and is registered as an NGO in Kenya and a 501(c)(3) in the US. CFK Africa empowers youth in slums.

== Philosophy ==
CFK Africa's philosophy is grounded in participatory development and local leadership. As a registered nonprofit in the U.S. and a registered NGO in Kenya, CFK Africa is led by its chief executive officer, Jeffrey Okoro, and executive director, Beth-Ann Kutchma, who report to a joint board of directors composed of both Kenyan and American volunteers. CFK Africa co-founder, Rye Barcott, currently serves as the board chair. In 2020, CFK Africa convened an advisory council, a diverse group of 24 international leaders, including former CDC Director Dr. Bill Roper.

== Awards and impact ==
Time magazine named CFK Africa a "Hero of Global Health" in 2005, and ABC News named CFK Africa co-founder Rye Barcott Person of the Year in 2006 for his work in Kibera and his service as a U.S. marine. Time for Kids featured CFK on the cover of its March 30, 2007, edition. In 2004, Canadian musician Sarah McLachlan concluded her award-winning music video "World on Fire" with footage of CFK Africa's soccer tournaments and medical clinic in Kibera. Two years later, CFK Africa published LIGHTBOX: Expressions of Hope from Young Women in the Kibera Slum. This powerful book of narratives and photographs from disposable cameras gives voice to the young and courageous women of CFK Africa's Binti Pamoja (Daughters United) program. In 2007, then Senator Barack Obama visited CFK Africa's youth center and gave a landmark speech calling for ethnic unity and education in Kibera. CFK Africa played a crucial role in providing emergency aid during the Kenyan post-election violence in 2008, and for its efforts, the Oklahoma City National Memorial and Museum honored CFK Africa as its recipient of the Reflections of Hope Award in a ceremony with the former ABC World News Anchor Bob Woodruff and his wife Lee.

In 2008, CFK Africa received a $1 million grant for capacity building and income generation expansion from the Bill and Melinda Gates Foundation. Jill Biden visited CFK Africa's Binti Pamoja Centre in 2010 as she sought to promote women's rights, girls' empowerment, and gender equality around the world. In 2011, Barcott published It Happened on the Way to War, which juxtaposes military service and social entrepreneurship. The book was chosen as required reading for freshman classes at NC State University (2012) [9 and East Carolina University (2013). In 2012, Kathleen McGinn of Harvard Business School profiled CFK Africa as the topic for the school's first ever multi-media case study. Susan Mueni Waita, a participant in CFK Africa's Girls' Empowerment Program, received a Queen's Young Leaders Award in 2016 for her work supporting girls and women in Kibera. She founded an organization called Making a Difference (MAD) Sisters to educate girls on sexual health. In 2018, Rye Barcott delivered the commencement address at the University of North Carolina at Chapel Hill. In 2020, CFK Africa led COVID-19 sample collection and contact tracing efforts in partnership with the CDC and Kenya Medical Research Institute. CFK Africa's facilities were awarded Best Performing in Neonatal Care, Leadership, and Human Resource Management by Nairobi City County for the 2024 Health Service Delivery Awards. In 2025, CFK Africa's national soccer team, the Kibera Soccer Women FC, won the Football Kenya Federation's Women's Cup, the first slum team to achieve the title.

In 2025, CFK Africa established the first allyship model that equips landlords who lease 10x10 shanties with tools for gender-based violence surveillance, prevention, and rapid response, a groundbreaking model that transforms them into active partners in protecting women and girls.

CFK established the Pheroze Nowrojee Social Justice Award, named in honor of the bright legal mind and fierce defender of human dignity and justice in Kenya, presenting the inaugural award to Binti Rashid, young mother and girls empowerment advocate in Kibera in 2025.

In 2026, CFK Africa published Still, I Rise, a collection of first-person essays by 28 teenage mothers in Kenya. The young women, participants in CFK's Funzo Project, spent a year developing their essays through creative writing workshops and psychosocial support. The book was co-edited by Siama Yusuf, CFK's senior program officer for girls' empowerment, and Charlotte Barcott, a high school student from North Carolina. The book was the subject of an October 2026 interview with its editors on WBUR's Here & Now.

== CFK Africa Programming ==
CFK Africa implements programming in the core areas of Youth Leadership, Clinical and Community Health, Girls' Empowerment, and Sports for Development.

=== Youth Leadership ===
- Best Schools Initiative (BSI): Improves the educational outcomes of thousands of children in informal schools in Kibera by implementing interventions co-designed with teachers, parents, and tutors.
- TechCraft Workforce: Places youth in trade jobs and digital gigs through high-speed training tracks that match the market and community needs.
- Scholarships: Provides scholarships to cover the cost of school fees and engages students with mentorship, leadership training, career guidance, field trips, and community service.

=== Clinical and Community Health ===
- Tabitha Maternity Home (TMH): Provides affordable, high-quality maternal and child health care services and reduces maternal and child mortality in Kibera. To maximize accessibility, the facility is centrally located, open 24/7, and has an ambulance to facilitate emergency transportation.
- Tabitha Medical Clinic (TMC): A full-scale medical facility in the heart of Kibera with trained clinicians, nurses, and lab technicians to screen for, identify, and diagnose both communicable and non-communicable diseases; hosts one of the largest urban infectious disease surveillance platforms that the US CDC has established globally in an informal settlement.
- Youth Friendly Services Center (YFS): Center for youth to take ICT courses, receive mental health couseling, sexual/reprodutive education, and HIV testing.
- CARE Groups: Peer-to-peer information-sharing groups for pregnant and lactating women with children under 2 years. Each care group has 10-15 women who meet to discuss topics related to Maternal and Child Health and cascade the knowledge acquired to the community. The women in the care group are agents of change in promoting healthy maternal and child health practices for good health outcomes.
- Nutrition: Focuses on preventing, identifying, and treating malnutrition among children under 5. Integrates malnutrition screening and treatment throughout health facilities, with government partners, and at the household level with community health promoters.

=== Girls' Empowerment ===
- Funzo: Improves the health, wellness, and education outcomes of teenage mothers by providing avenues for young mothers to continue their education paired with safe space sessions, psychosocial support, and advocacy at the family, community, and institutional levels.
- Menstrual Hygiene Management Lab: Provides a safe, educational space where youth can learn about sexual and reproductive health and access menstrual health resources.
- Safe Spaces: CFK Africa was the lead partner in developing, implementing, and piloting the “Girl-Centered Design” and the “Safe Spaces” models in collaboration with the Population Council in 2008, which has been internationally recognized as a leading program model for girls’ empowerment. Creating safe spaces for girls and young women serves as a primary connection point with CFK Africa. It provides a secure environment where they are physically, emotionally, and psychologically safe to express themselves, forming strong sisterhoods and gaining access to valuable resources and mentorship.
- Girls’ Parliament: CFK Africa's Girls Parliament encourages adolescent girls to find their voices to demand action on issues they care about, practice leadership, and develop public speaking skills. Girls use their advocacy skills to educate the community through large-scale sensitization events generating community-wide awareness around issues like gender-based violence.
- Allyship: Leverages the power of landlords to fight SGBV, increase reporting, and save lives in violent, escalating situations.
- Women at Work: Places women in male-dominated tech and trade jobs to increase their lifetime earning potential.

=== Sports for Development ===
- Kibera Soccer Football Clubs: Talented men and women's soccer teams, supported by lead sponsor Cloudflare in the 2024/2025 and 2025/2026 seasons, who play at the national level and serve as social change champions related to issues of girls empowerment, access to education, ending GBV and sexual and reproductive health.
- Value-Based Sports (VBS): Conducts extensive leadership training with coaches, referees, parents, and teachers to engage students in conversations that encourage participation in school and discourage drug use, crime, and violence. Soccer drills are paired with discussions that equip youth with resilience tools and develop healthy behaviors.
- Community Soccer Tournaments: Engages community teams in informal settlements, serving as an entry point to connect youth with health services, break down social barriers, build friendships, and develop a sense of belonging.
