= Janet =

Janet may refer to:

== Names ==
- Janet (given name)

=== Surname ===
- Charles Janet (1849–1932), French engineer, inventor and biologist, known for the Left Step periodic table
- Jules Janet (1861–1945), French psychologist and psychotherapist
- Maurice Janet (1888–1983), French mathematician
- Paul Janet (1823–1899), French philosopher and writer
- Pierre Janet (1859–1947), French psychologist, philosopher and psychotherapist
- Roberto Janet (born 1986), Cuban hammer thrower

== Other uses ==
- Janet, Alberta, a Canadian hamlet
- Janet (airline), a military transport fleet known for serving the US Air Force "Area 51" facility
- JANET, a high-speed network for the UK research and education community
- Janet (album), by Janet Jackson
- Janet (video), a video compilation by Janet Jackson
- "Janet" (song), 1985, by Commodores
- Hurricane Janet, 1955
