= With Honor Action =

With Honor Action, Inc.
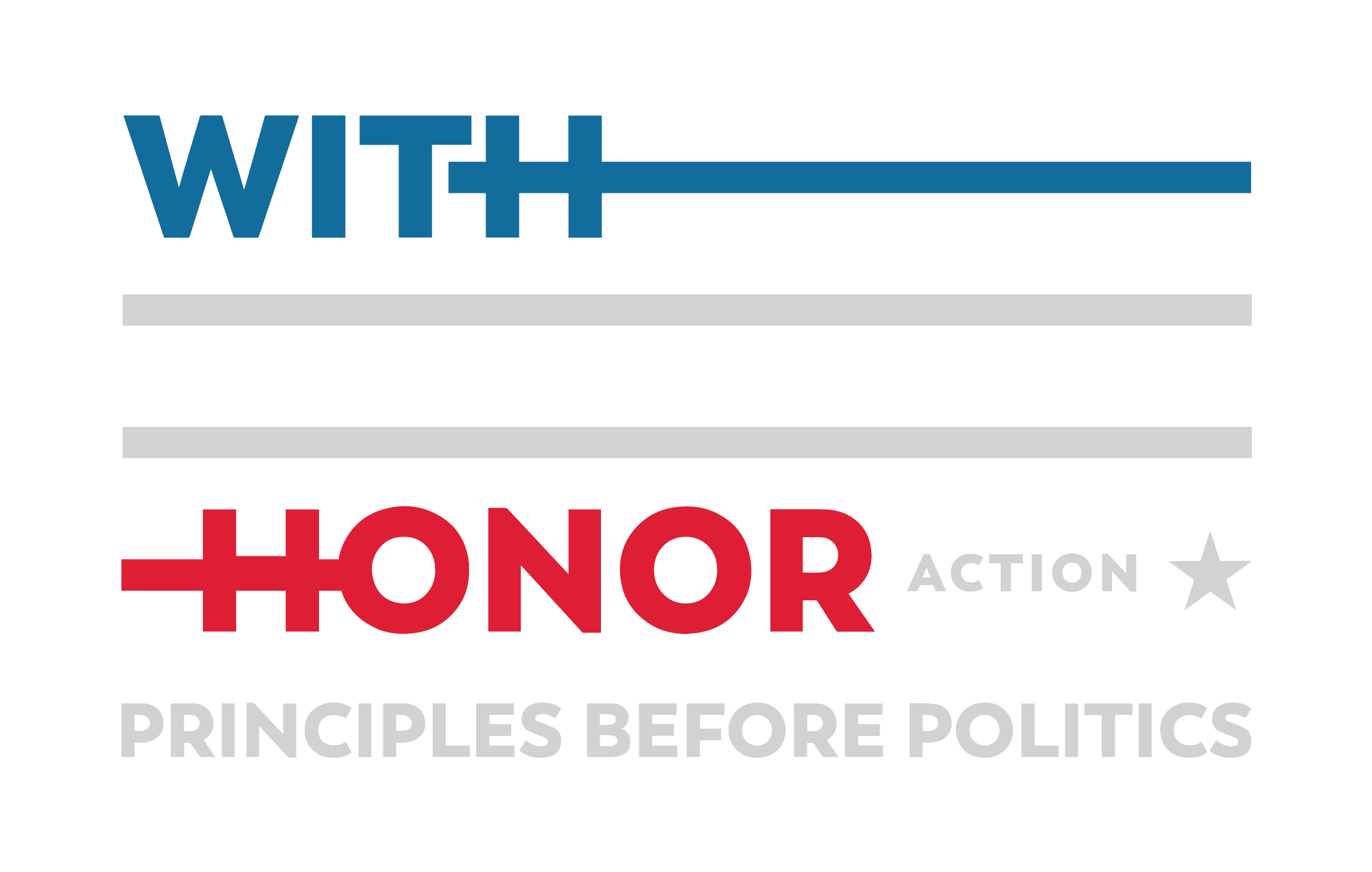
- Abbreviation: With Honor
- Formation: June 7, 2017
- Founders: Rye Barcott (Co-Founder & CEO); Allan Filip (EVP)
- Type: Advocacy Organization
- Tax ID no.: 82-1940227
- Legal status: 501(c)(4) nonprofit charitable corporation
- Purpose: Nonpartisan Good Governance
- Headquarters: 700 Pennsylvania Ave SE, Washington, DC 20003
- Region served: United States
- Website: WithHonor.org

With Honor Action. (commonly known as “With Honor”) is a U.S. 501(c)(4) social-welfare nonprofit organization that advocates for principled veteran leadership in elected office and for cross-partisan cooperation in Congress. Founded in 2017, the organization focuses on reducing political polarization by supporting veteran candidates and advancing bipartisan legislation, particularly in national security, national service, and veterans’ affairs.

With Honor was co-founded by Marine Corps veterans Rye Barcott and Peter Dixon, and Navy veteran David Gergen, a longtime presidential advisor.

== History ==
With Honor Action was established in early 2017 as part of a broader initiative known as With Honor, aimed at recruiting, supporting, and electing post-9/11 U.S. military veterans who take the With Honor Pledge to serve with integrity, civility, and courage. The founders cited the decline in veteran representation in Congress from more than seventy percent to below twenty percent and rising polarization as central motivations for the organization’s creation.

Barcott, a Marine Corps veteran who served in Iraq, Bosnia, and the Horn of Africa, serves as With Honor’s chief executive officer. He has stated that the organization’s mission is rooted in the belief that the decline in veteran representation in Congress has contributed to increased dysfunction and polarization in U.S. politics. Having served in the Marine Corps with current United States Representative Seth Moulton, a Democrat, and former Representative Mike Gallagher, a Republican, Barcott has cited a dedication to a “common mission” as part of the inspiration for With Honor.

With Honor has also identified financial barriers and limited access to political networks as significant challenges facing younger veterans seeking public office. With Honor addresses these obstacles by providing early-stage support, issue education, and access to political networks.

With Honor publicly launched on Veterans Day 2017, when Barcott and Jake Wood, co-founder of Team Rubicon and a member of With Honor’s inaugural advisory board, published an op-ed in Time, arguing that increasing next-generation veteran representation in Congress could serve as an antidote to political dysfunction.

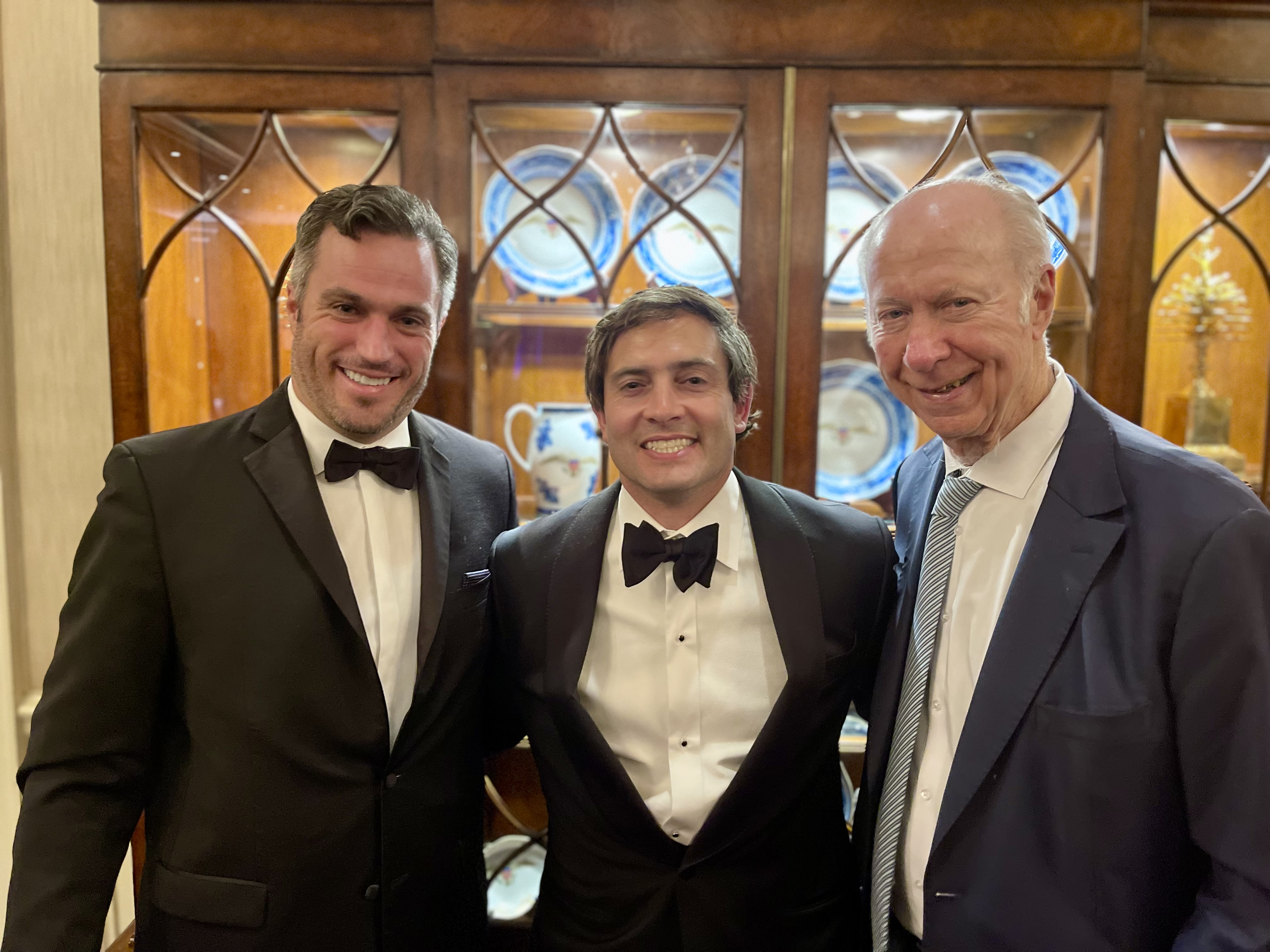
With Honor Co-Founders Peter Dixon, Rye Barcott, and David Gergen at the With Honor Action Gala for the 117th Congress, 2023.

The organization defines its mission as promoting and advancing principled veteran leadership in elected public service and fostering a culture of collaboration across party lines. Its activities include candidate support and advocacy, policy education, issue-based coalitions, and legislative engagement.

== Pledge ==
Veteran candidates endorsed by With Honor are asked to take the With Honor Pledge to embody the following ideals

=== Integrity ===
1. I will be honest.
2. I will use the power of my office only for the service of my constituents and my country.

=== Civility ===
1. I will work to bring civility to elected office.
2. I will participate in a cross-partisan veterans caucus.

=== Courage ===
1. I will meet with a Member from an opposing party one-on-one at least once a month.
2. I will join with colleagues on both sides of the aisle on at least one piece of substantial legislation each year, and co-sponsor additional pieces.

== Congress ==
=== For Country Caucus ===
Eighth Annual Vietnam Veterans Memorial Day wall cleaning with bipartisan veterans in Congress, 2026.

Following the 2018 midterm elections, veteran members of the U.S. House of Representatives supported by With Honor established the For Country Caucus, a bipartisan congressional caucus. At its founding, it included nearly 20 members in the U.S. House of Representatives and was co-chaired by Representative Jimmy Panetta (D-CA), a Navy veteran and son of Leon Panetta, and Representative Don Bacon (R-NE), a retired Air Force brigadier general who served for nearly 30 years. Vice-chairs included Representative Chrissy Houlahan (D-PA), an Air Force veteran, and then-Representative Michael Waltz, an Army veteran and a former Green Beret. The caucus is currently co-chaired by Navy veteran Representative Jake Ellzey and Air Force veteran Representative Don Davis.The caucus has since expanded and continues to operate on a bipartisan basis, meeting regularly and collaborating on shared legislative priorities. Former members include New Jersey Governor Mikie Sherrill, North Carolina Attorney General Jeff Jackson, ambassador to the United Nations Mike Waltz, former Chairman of the Select Committee on Strategic Competition between the United States and the Chinese Communist Party Mike Gallagher, Maryland Attorney General Anthony Brown, and former Representative Peter Meijer.

Each year, With Honor Action joins the For Country Caucus to clean the Vietnam Veterans Memorial, an annual tradition begun in 2019 by then-Representative Mike Waltz, as the founding Vice Chair of the For Country Caucus. The event is regularly led by the remaining three Vietnam War veterans in Congress: Representatives Jim Baird and Mike Thompson, both Army veterans, and Representative Jack Bergman, a Marine Corps veteran.

National media coverage of the event has included CBS’s Margaret Brennan interviewing Representative Seth Moulton and Iowa Air National Guardsman Representative Zach Nunn,CNN’s Jake Tapper interviewing West Point classmates and Army veterans, Representatives Pat Ryan and John James, and Fox’s Bret Baier interviewing Co-Chairs Representatives Don Davis and Jake Ellzey.

==== Senate allies ====
Since at least 2023, With Honor has also engaged with a bipartisan group of U.S. Senators with backgrounds in military, foreign, and intelligence services. Members of this informal coalition have included Senators Roger Wicker (R-MS), an Air Force veteran, Senator Jack Reed (D-RI), an Army veteran, Senator Todd Young (R-IN), a Marine Corps veteran, and Senator Mark Kelly, a Navy veteran.

=== State Elections ===
In 2020, With Honor expanded its support to veterans running in statewide and local offices who committed to the values of the With Honor Pledge. In 2022, With Honor supported its first gubernatorial candidate, Army veteran Wes Moore, who became the 63rd Governor of Maryland. Moore had previously served on the With Honor Advisory Board. In 2024, it also began supporting select Senate candidates who are incumbents or running in open seats, including Senator Roger Wicker, an Air Force veteran, and Senator Ruben Gallego, a Marine Corps veteran. In 2025, it supported former For Country Caucus Vice Chair Mikie Sherrill’s successful run to become the 57th Governor of New Jersey, the first woman veteran elected governor.

== With Honor Institute ==
With Honor established With Honor Institute as a nonprofit 501(c)(3) arm to support research, education and training, veteran coalition building, fellowships, and U.S. Congressional Delegations in 2024.

== Research polling ==
With Honor has partnered with several research organizations to conduct national polling on issues related to national service, veterans, and U.S. foreign policy. In 2021, the organization partnered with Voices for National Service on a national survey that found strong support among young Americans for expanding service opportunities, with 81% of adults aged 18–24 supporting expansion through programs such as AmeriCorps.

In 2023, With Honor partnered with the research firm Ipsos to assess public attitudes towards evacuating and resettling Afghan allies who assisted U.S. forces during the war in Afghanistan. The poll found broad bipartisan support for honoring U.S. commitments, with nearly nine in ten Americans expressing support for resettlement efforts.

In 2025, With Honor partnered with Gallup on a national survey examining American perceptions of military veterans as political leaders. The poll found that a majority of U.S. adults reported being more likely to vote for a candidate with prior military service than one without, a higher preference than for candidates with government or business experience. Veterans are now included in Gallup’s foundational polls as a result of the With Honor-Gallup partnership.

== Partnerships ==
With Honor Action is partnered with organizations focused on governance reform, veterans’ issues, and national security, including The Lugar Center, the Special Competitive Studies Project, the American Legion, Travis Manion Foundation, Blue Star Families, VFW, Team Rubicon, the London Defence Conference and the Munich Security Conference. The organization also worked with several congressional commissions, including the National Commission on Military, National, and Public Service; the National Security Commission on Artificial Intelligence; the Cyberspace Solarium Commission; and the National Security Commission on Emerging Biotechnology.

== Policy work ==
Since establishing its advocacy arm, With Honor has supported the passage of over 200 legislative provisions, primarily related to national security, national service, and veterans’ affairs.

In 2020, the organization led a coalition of next-generation veteran nonprofits, including Team Rubicon, the Travis Manion Foundation, Iraq and Afghanistan Veterans of America, and Student Veterans of America, to advocate for the CORPS Act, elements of which were later enacted in the American Rescue Plan Act including nearly $1 billion in funding for AmeriCorps. In partnership with the National Commission on Military, National, and Public Service, With Honor Action initiated the Inspire to Serve Act with the founding leadership of the For Country Caucus Reps. Jimmy Panetta, Don Bacon, Chrissy Houlahan, and Mike Waltz. The comprehensive bill aimed to increase service opportunities through pathways such as the military and AmeriCorps and would lay the groundwork for expanding JROTC in public high schools nationwide.

With Honor also supported the passage of the Global War on Terrorism Memorial Location Act, which authorized the placement of a future memorial on the Reserve of the National Mall. With Honor Action has supported bipartisan efforts to address mental health challenges, particularly among service members and veterans, through legislation focused on access to care and prevention. The organization’s first endorsed legislation was to expand and codify the 988 Suicide and Crisis Lifeline, established through legislation led by Representative Seth Moulton to create a nationwide three-digit hotline for mental health emergencies. It has also supported the Brandon Act, which passed in the FY2022 National Defense Authorization Act, led by Rep. Seth Moulton, Rep. John Rutherford, Army veteran Rep. Mariannette Miller-Meeks, and With Honor Action ally Navy veteran Senator Mark Kelly, which improved access to mental health care for active-duty service members by allowing them to seek help through their chain of command confidentially.

In addition, With Honor Action has supported initiatives addressing blast overpressure exposure, including provisions in the National Defense Authorization Act and the bipartisan Blast Overpressure Safety Act, which aim to mitigate traumatic brain injuries through improved monitoring, research, and prevention measures for military personnel.

With Honor Action supported the bipartisan ACES Act, led by Air Force veteran Representative August Pfluger, which addresses the elevated cancer risks faced by military aviators and aircrew due to occupational exposures. The legislation established improved tracking, screening, and research to better understand and prevent service-related cancers, while ensuring earlier detection and care for those affected.

With Honor Action supported and amplified the work of the House Armed Services Committee’s bipartisan Military Quality of Life Panel, partnering closely with members of the For Country Caucus to elevate service member and family needs as a top congressional priority. The organization endorsed the panel’s legislative recommendations, which focus on core challenges such as military pay and compensation, housing conditions, access to child care and health care, and support for military spouses.

Rep. Chrissy Houlahan, a leader of the Military Quality of Life Panel, joins With Honor Action for a demonstration on the National Mall highlighting food insecurity among military families.

The organization engaged directly with panel leaders, Representatives Don Bacon and Chrissy Houlahan, both Air Force veterans, to help shape and promote policy solutions to strengthen recruitment and retention in the all-volunteer force. The group has also highlighted quality-of-life reforms as central to national security, citing issues such as food insecurity, inadequate housing, and gaps in mental and maternal health care as urgent areas for bipartisan action, and supported efforts to translate the panel’s findings into provisions of the Servicemember Quality of Life Improvement and National Defense Authorization Act for Fiscal Year 2025, which included a targeted 10% pay raise for junior enlisted service members to fight food insecurity, which disproportionately impacts junior enlisted service members and their families. In 2024, the organization conducted a demonstration on the National Mall, highlighting food insecurity in the military by planting 325 U.S. flags in the ground, each representing 1,000 service members and military families experiencing food insecurity.

In the lead-up to the U.S. withdrawal from Afghanistan, the organization helped establish the Evacuate our Allies Coalition, which advocated for the relocation and resettlement of Afghan nationals who assisted U.S. forces. The group’s efforts contributed to the largest expansion of the Special Immigrant Visa program in its history in 2024.

With Honor Action helped advance U.S. biotechnology policy through its work supporting the establishment of the National Security Commission on Emerging Biotechnology, collaborating with bipartisan For Country Caucus members to help create the commission in 2021 to assess how emerging biotech will shape national security and Department of Defense operations. Building on the commission’s 2025 recommendations, the organization has continued to work alongside congressional partners to translate the commission’s findings into legislation, culminating in the inclusion of 17 With Honor Action–supported provisions in the Fiscal Year 2026 National Defense Authorization Act.

With Honor Action has advocated for strengthening U.S. support for democratic allies and partners, including Ukraine and Taiwan, through bipartisan legislative initiatives and alliance-building efforts. In response to Russia’s invasion of Ukraine, the organization supported multiple spending packages providing tens of billions of dollars in military and humanitarian aid, as well as legislation such as the REPO for Ukrainians Act, which allowed governments to seize and sell Russian assets held in western banks to support Ukrainian rebuilding efforts financially, and the Abducted Ukrainian Children Recovery and Accountability Act, which increases U.S. federal government support to identify and return kidnapped Ukrainian children who were taken to Russia or Russian-controlled territories.

For Country Caucus Founding Co-Chairs Reps. Jimmy Panetta (second from left) and Don Bacon (fourth from right), and Vice Chairs for the 119th Congress Reps. Troy Downing (far left) and Herb Conaway (second from right) outside of Kharkiv during a 2024 trip to Ukraine.

For their work supporting Ukraine, Founding For Country Caucus Co-Chairs Representatives Don Bacon and Jimmy Panetta, former Vice Chair Representative Salud Carbajal, Rye Barcott, and former U.S. Senator Rob Portman were awarded the Ukrainian Certificate of Merit by the Ukrainian Parliament during a 2024 bipartisan congressional visit to Kyiv.”

It has also supported measures reinforcing the NATO alliance, including congressional affirmations of U.S. commitment, such as the NATO Support Act, which prohibits U.S. withdrawal from NATO without congressional approval, and initiatives such as the NATO Innovation Fund, a $1 billion fund administered by NATO to support tech startups, and the Baltic Security Initiative, a Department of Defense program to support NATO’s eastern flank nations, to strengthen collective defense and deterrence.

Beyond Europe, With Honor Action has backed legislation aimed at countering threats from the Chinese Communist Party and supporting Taiwan, including efforts to improve foreign military sales processes through the TIGER Act and the Taiwan Cybersecurity Resiliency Act, which expands joint cybersecurity training and defense coordination.

It has also supported broader congressional efforts to address risks from Chinese-linked technology platforms and infrastructure, including legislation that forced divestment of CCP control of TikTok over concerns about CCP access to U.S. user data, and prohibitions on U.S. firms engaging with Huawei and biotech firms with connections to the CCP.

With Honor Action helped to initiate and support the bipartisan SHIPS for America Act, led by Senators Todd Young and Mark Kelly, which aims to revitalize the U.S. maritime industry by expanding domestic shipbuilding capacity, strengthening the maritime workforce, and improving supply chain resilience for national and economic security.

== Courage Can Save Us ==
In June 2026, in advance of America’s 250th anniversary, Bloomsbury is scheduled to publish Courage Can Save US by Rye Barcott. The book profiles ten elected American leaders five Republicans and five Democrats, including nine military veterans and one former FBI agent and their paths to public service. Pulitzer Prize–winning historian Doris Kearns Goodwin wrote in an advance endorsement of the book:

"For much of the twentieth century, military service helped shape American leadership. Nearly two-thirds of our presidents wore the nation’s uniform, and in the decades after World War II veterans held the majority of seats in Congress—an era when bipartisanship flourished. In Courage Can Save US, Rye Barcott shines a dramatic spotlight on 9 veterans and an FBI agent—men and women, Republicans and Democrats—now serving in elected office across the country. Forged in service and tested by sacrifice, their inspiring stories reveal how courage, character, and common purpose can still renew our democracy and restore hope for its future".

== Press ==
With Honor’s advocacy work has been covered extensively by national media and international media, including on NPR, Fox News, TIME, The Atlantic. The Washington Post, Stars and Stripes, Military Times, C-SPAN, and Michael Smerconish on SiriusXM.

== Advisory board members ==
- Robert Gates
- Nadja West
- H. R. McMaster
- Michael Mullen
- Tom Daschle
- Jane Holl Lute
- Mack McLarty
- Barbara Mikulski
- Rob Portman
- Mike Bezos
- Dana Born
- Bill Conway
- Tucker Eskew
- Doug Foshee
- Florent Groberg
- Christopher Howard
- Bob Sternfels
- Frances Townsend

=== Deceased board members ===
- Dirk Kempthorne
- Henry Kissinger
- John Warner
- David Gergen
- Madeleine Albright
- George Shultz
