= Latrobe High School =

School in Tasmania, Australia

Location
- Latrobe, Tasmania; Australia; 41°14′10″S 146°25′27″E

Information
- Type: Government comprehensive secondary school
- Motto: Latin: Fortis et stabilis (Strength and stability)
- Established: 4 February 1964; 62 years ago
- Status: Open
- School district: Northern
- Educational authority: Department for Education, Children and Young People
- Oversight: Office of Tasmanian Assessment, Standards & Certification
- Principal: Dane Hardy
- Teaching staff: 34.2 FTE (2019)
- Years: 7–12
- Gender: Co-educational
- Enrolment: 484 (2019)
- Campus type: Regional
- Colours: Yellow, blue & maroon
- Website: latrobehigh.education.tas.edu.au

Latrobe High School is a government co-educational comprehensive secondary school located in Latrobe, Tasmania, Australia. Established in 1964, the school caters for approximately 500 students from Years 7 to 12. The school is administered by the Department for Education, Children and Young People.

In 2019 student enrolments were 484. The school principal is Brent Armitstead.

== History ==
Latrobe High School was formed when the then Latrobe School separated into the Latrobe High School and Latrobe Primary School. The high school opened on 4 February 1964 with an initial enrolment of 263 students. The school had not been completed, only nine rooms and a shelter area were available to staff and students at the time.

In 2015 the Latrobe High School underwent a major refurbishment.

== See also ==
- List of schools in Tasmania
- Education in Tasmania
