= Rye Barcott =

American author and social entrepreneur

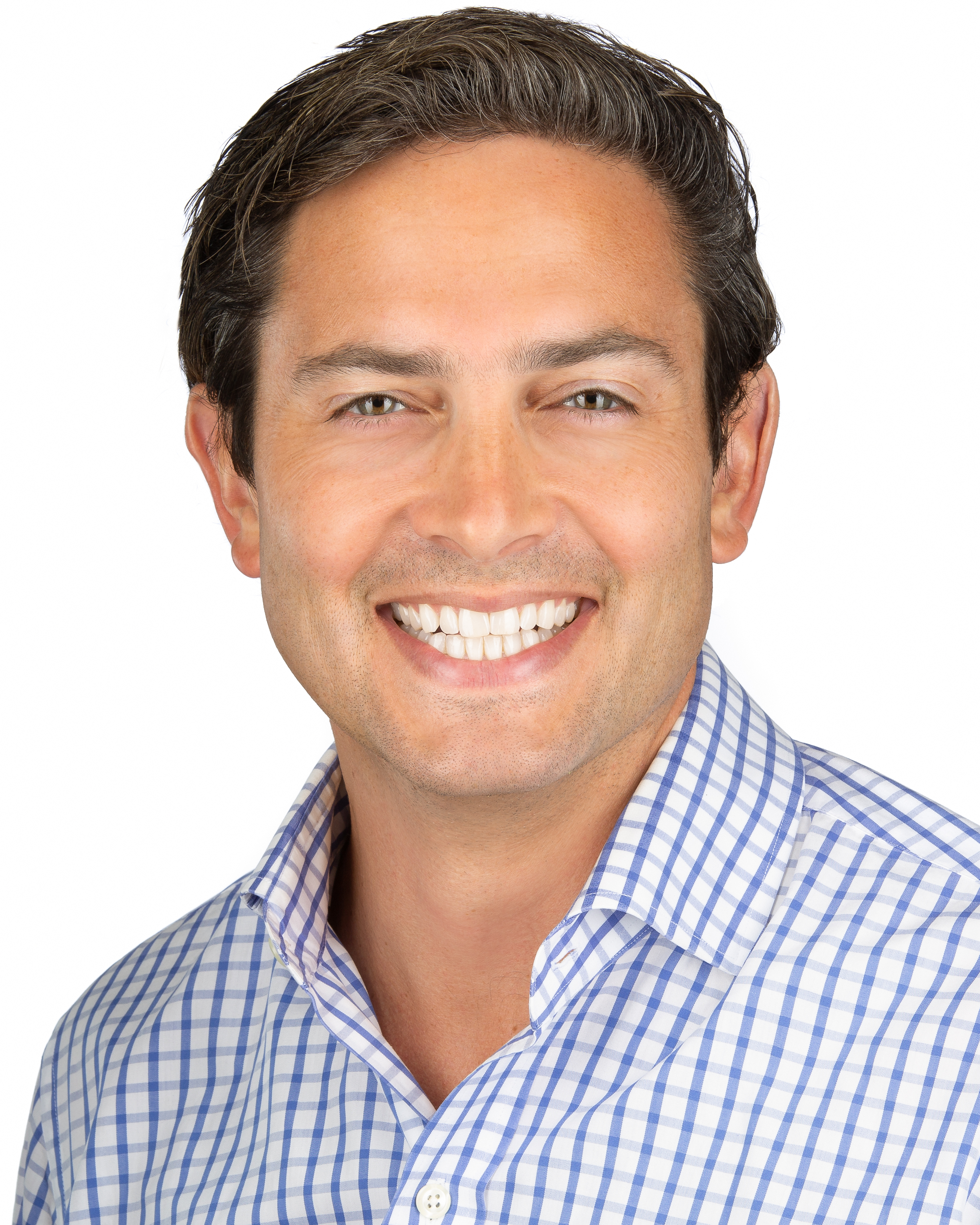

Cofounder and CEO of With Honor

Personal details
- Born: 1979 (age 46–47)
- Spouse: Tracy Barcott
- Parents: Timothy Schwartz-Barcott (father); Donna Schwartz-Barcott (mother)
- Education: University of North Carolina at Chapel Hill; Harvard University
- Occupation: Social entrepreneur; Investor; author
- Website: It Happened on the Way to War; Courage Can Save Us

Military service
- Allegiance: United States
- Branch/service: United States Marine Corps
- Years of service: 2001–2006
- Rank: Captain

Rye Barcott (born February 10, 1979) is an American social entrepreneur, investor, author and former U.S. Marine Corps officer. He is the co-founder and CEO of With Honor, a cross-partisan organization that fights polarization by supporting principled veteran leadership in public office. While serving in the Marine Corps, he co-founded CFK Africa (formerly Carolina for Kibera), a locally led youth leadership and public health organization based in Kibera, Nairobi, Kenya. He is the author of It Happened on the Way to War: A Marine’s Path to Peace (2011) and Courage Can Save US: Ten Extraordinary Americans and the Fight for Our Future (2026).

== Biography ==
=== Early life and education ===
He was born to Donna Schwartz-Barcott, an anthropologist and nursing professor at the University of Rhode Island, and Timothy Schwartz-Barcott, a sociologist, author and former Marine Corps captain who served in the Vietnam War survived an enemy gunshot to the face, and earned a Bronze Star with a combat “V” for valor. His parents met while attending graduate school at The University of North Carolina at Chapel Hill (UNC).

Barcott attended East Greenwich High School. He graduated in 2001 Phi Beta Kappa from UNC. He attended UNC on a four-year Marine Corps NROTC scholarship. Barcott graduated in 2009 with an MPA and MBA from Harvard University, where he was a Center for Public Leadership Social Entrepreneurship Fellow and George Leadership Fellow. Harvard University President Drew Faust appointed him to a two-year term on Harvard Endowment's Advisory Committee on Shareholder Responsibility, and he served as a founding member of the movement to create an MBA Oath. He was elected as a member of Harvard's Alumni Association Board of Directors in 2016.

== Career ==
=== Military service ===
He served five years on active duty in the Marine Corps, where he attained the rank of captain and deployed to Bosnia, the Horn of Africa, and Iraq. In 2006, he provided written testimony to the Iraq Study Group and authored an article about the Iraqi Military Intelligence Academy in Proceedings, the professional journal of the US Navy. ABC World News with Charles Gibson covered his work in Kibera and his military service in Iraq and named him a Person of the Week and a 2006 Person of the Year.

=== CFK Africa ===
While an undergraduate at UNC in 2001, Barcott founded Carolina for Kibera (CFK Africa) as a youth leadership and public health non-governmental organization to fight extreme poverty in slums in Kenya with Salim Mohamed and Tabitha Atieno Festo. CFK started as a small inter-ethnic soccer program and medical clinic run out of Festo's ten-by-ten foot shack. It is a major affiliated entity of UNC and partner of the U.S. Centers for Disease Control and Prevention. Since 2004, CFK Africa has partnered with the U.S. Centers for Disease Control and Prevention and the Kenya Medical Research Institute. Time and the Gates Foundation recognized CFK Africa as a “Hero of Global Health.” Barcott’s experiences with CFK Africa and his military service are described in his memoir, It Happened on the Way to War.

=== Business career ===
Barcott and Dan McCready co-founded Double Time Capital in 2013 as an impact investment firm focused on clean energy and sustainability. As of February 2017, "Double Time has financed 36 solar energy projects, which collectively produce roughly 10% of North Carolina's solar power and power around 30,000 homes in the state." At that time, North Carolina was ranked second among US states based on cumulative solar installed capacity.

Prior to forming Double Time Capital, Barcott worked as a special advisor to the late CEO and Chairman of Duke Energy, Jim Rogers. Barcott formed and led an investment team for the CEO that focused on renewable energy and disruptive growth opportunities.

=== With Honor ===
Barcott co-founded With Honor in 2017 with the late bipartisan presidential advisor and Navy veteran David Gergen and entrepreneur and Marine Corps Iraq and Afghanistan war veteran Peter Dixon. The organization works with veterans and national security professionals running for elected office and supports bipartisan cooperation in government.

With Honor has worked with members of both major political parties, including through the bipartisan For Country Caucus in the U.S. House of Representatives, as well as a coalition of senators and governors.

Since its founding, the organization has supported the election of more than 100 veterans and national security professionals to public office, including 50 serving in Congress, and has helped advance more than 200 bipartisan laws focused on national security, national service, and veterans’ affairs.

== Writing and publications ==
Barcott is the author of the memoir It Happened on the Way to War (Bloomsbury Publishing). The book's dedication to CFK Africa cofounders Salim Mohamed, a community organizer, and Tabitha Atieno Festo, a nurse, includes a phrase that captures the central theme of the book: Talent is universal; opportunity is not. The book explores the intersection of social entrepreneurship and military service.

Reader’s Digest named it one of the top four nonfiction books of the year. The North Carolina Literary and Historical Association recognized it as the state’s top nonfiction work in 2011, awarding it the Ragan Old North State Award for Nonfiction. The TED Conference selected it for its annual book club. Following its publication, Dartmouth College awarded Barcott an honorary Doctorate of Humane Letters.

In 2026, he published Courage Can Save US: Ten Extraordinary Americans and the Fight for Our Future (Bloomsbury Publishing), which profiles American political leaders who served in the military and the FBI—five Democrats and five Republicans—and examines themes of public service and bipartisan governance in a divided era. The book was published to coincide with America’s 250th anniversary, the 25th anniversary of the attacks of September 11, and the 70th anniversary of the publication of John F. Kennedy’s Profiles in Courage. “Courage Can Save US debuted at No. 5 on The New York Times Hardcover Nonfiction Best Sellers list dated June 28, 2026, and remained on the list for four consecutive weeks.” It also debuted at No. 1 on Publishers Weekly’s hardcover nonfiction list in the June 22, 2026 issue.

Courage Can Save US received early acclaim from historian Doris Kearns Goodwin, who wrote "For much of the twentieth century, military service helped shape American leadership. Nearly two-thirds of our presidents wore the nation’s uniform, and in the decades after World War II veterans held the majority of seats in Congress—an era when bipartisanship flourished. In Courage Can Save US, Rye Barcott shines a dramatic spotlight on 9 veterans and an FBI agent now serving in elected office across the country. Forged in service and tested by sacrifice, their inspiring stories reveal how courage, character, and common purpose can still renew our democracy and restore hope for its future."

In 2003, Barcott co-edited with Dr. Carolyn Pumphrey Armed Conflict in Africa (Scarecrow Press), a book that analyzed the sources of violence in Africa. His post-9/11 letters with Salim Mohamed were published in expanded version of Andrew Carroll's War Letters: Extraordinary Correspondence from American Wars (Scribner, 2008). He contributed to Passion and Purpose (Harvard Business Review Press, 2011), and 27 Views of Charlotte: The Queen City in Prose and Poetry (Eno Publishers, 2014). His writing has appeared in The Washington Post, The New York Times, USA Today, The Wall Street Journal, and TIME.

== Honors and recognition ==
Barcott has received recognition for his work in public service, writing, and social entrepreneurship, including:

- ABC World News Tonight Person of the Week and Person of the Year (2006)
- University of North Carolina at Chapel Hill Gillings School of Global Public Health commencement speaker (2007)
- TED Fellow (2009)
- Harvard Business School Dean's Award for Service to the School and Society (2009)
- World Economic Forum Young Global Leader (2011)
- Presidential appointment to the Fulbright Foreign Scholarship Board (2012)
- Honorary Doctorate of Humane Letters, Dartmouth College (2016)
- University of North Carolina at Chapel Hill Spring Commencement Speaker (2018)
- Presidential Leadership Scholar (2019)
- Voices for National Service Advocate of the Year Award (2022)
- Corporal Allen J. Striffler USMC Marine for Life Award (2024)
- Honorary Diploma of the Verkhovna Rada of Ukraine, the Ukrainian Parliament (2024)
- Amazon Editors' Pick nonfiction Best Books of the Month for Courage Can Save US (June 2026)

=== Boards and affiliations ===
- CFK Africa Board Chair
- Global War on Terrorism Memorial Foundation Board of Advisors
- Stanford Hoover Institution Veteran Fellowship Program Advisory Council
- United States Institute of Peace International Advisory Council
- More Perfect National Advisory Council

== Personal life ==
He is the husband of Dr. Tracy Barcott, a child psychologist. They live in North Carolina and have three children.
