= Jeanette Ullyett =

New Zealand cricketer (born 1986)

Jeanette Christine Ullyett (born 2 August 1986 in Standerton, South Africa) is a former New Zealand cricketer who played 39 State League matches for the Northern Districts Spirit between 2003 and 2007. A right-handed batsman and wicket-keeper, she averaged 6.13 across her career.
