= Richard Smithells =

British paediatrician (1924–2002)

Richard Worthington Smithells
- Born: 12 July 1924; Bushey, London, England
- Died: 13 June 2002 (aged 77)
- Education: King's College London GKT School of Medical Education
- Known for: research into neural tube defects
- Awards: Harding award 1985, James Spence Medal 1992, Dawson Williams Memorial Prize 1998
- Scientific career
- Fields: Pediatrics
- Workplaces: University of Leeds, Guy's Hospital, University of Liverpool

Richard Worthington Smithells (12 July 1924 – 13 June 2002) was a British paediatrician and Emeritus professor of paediatrics at the University of Leeds. Smithells was most notable for research into neural tube defects, congenital abnormality registers, genetic counselling, and rubella in pregnancy and for later suggesting direct examination of the foetus by photography using ultrasonography.

== Life ==
Smithells great uncle and grandfather had been professors of chemistry at the University of Leeds and his father was a Leeds graduate, so Smithells family always had a strong connection to the university. Smithells took his early education at Rugby School and later studied medicine at St. Thomas' Hospital Medical School. This was followed by 2 years of national service with the Royal Army Medical Corps in Germany in 1949–1951.

In 1948 he married Joy Muriel Foster née Beaver, who died 4 February 2010. They had five children and eleven grand-children.

Smithells died on 13 June 2002 from prostate cancer.

== Career ==
After two years as a senior registrar at Guy's Hospital, in 1959, Smithells became a lecturer at the University of Liverpool and became consultant paediatrician and medical superintendent for Alder Hey Children's Hospital in 1964. In 1968 he took up the chair of Paediatrics and Child Health at Leeds University, and worked in all the hospitals in Leeds. By 1962, Smithells had established congenital abnormality register and genetic counselling service at the University of Liverpool.

Smithells retired from the chair of Paediatrics and Child Health in 1988. After his retirement, he continued to work. From 1989 to 1997 Smithells was appointed a medical consultant in vaccine damage tribunals that were established in 1979 to provide payments to children seen to be damaged by a vaccine. Further appointments included a position as a consultant on the European Registration of Congenital Abnormalities and Twins registry. From 1994 to 1996 he also employed as part-time Director of the International Centre for Birth Defects in Rome, Italy.

== Contributions ==
Dick Smithells work during his long career was the prevention of disease in children. Early in his career, Smithells recognized the effects of poor nutrition in pregnant women and how it led to birth defects with studies taking many years. Indeed his most notable research in his career, was the establishing link between folic acid deficiency and neural tube defects. It wasn't until 1991 that the Medical Research Council ratified his decision by recommending that pregnant women's diets should contain sufficient folic acid.

Many of Smithells early papers were about the effects of Thalidomide on the foetus, and he developed a special unit to support children damaged by thalidomide, and was later heavily involved in securing compensation for children disabled by the thalidomide drug, and taking a position in the Thalidomide Trust to facilitate that role.

== Bibliography ==
These are Smithells most important papers:

- Smithells, R W; Sheppard, S; Schorah, C J (1976). "Vitamin dificiencies and neural tube defects". Archives of Disease in Childhood. 51 (12): 944–950. doi:10.1136/adc.51.12.944. ISSN 0003-9888. PMC 1546171. PMID 1015847.
- Smithells, R. W. (June 1962). "The Liverpool Congenital Abnormalities Registry". Developmental Medicine & Child Neurology. 4 (3): 320–324. doi:10.1111/j.1469-8749.1962.tb03174.x. PMID 13914463. S2CID 33805465.
- Smithells, R. W. (December 1962). "Rubella in Pregnancy". Developmental Medicine & Child Neurology. 46 (6): 640–642. doi:10.1111/j.1469-8749.1962.tb04158.x. PMID 13989608. S2CID 37159310.

Smithells wrote the following books that described diagnostic methods before the rise of ultrasound scans.

- The Early Diagnosis of Congenital Abnormalities., R W Smithells. Cassell: London, 1963.
- Why are babies born deformed? R W Smithells. University of Exeter, 1983.
- Clinical examination of children., S R Meadow; R W Smithells. Blackwell Scientific Publications, 1991

== Awards and honours ==
In 1985, Smithells was awarded the Harding award in 1985 from Action Research for the Crippled Child In 1992, Smithells was awarded the prestigious James Spence Gold Medal in 1992, by the Royal College of Paediatrics and Child Health. The Rank Prize for Nutrition followed and was awarded jointly in 1995. In 1998 he won the Dawson Williams Memorial Prize of the British Medical Association. During 2000, Smithells won the International Research Award of the Joseph P Kennedy Foundation for research into the role of folic acid in preventing neural tube defects.
