= Richard H. R. White =

British paediatric nephrologist

Richard H.R. White
- Richard White at his acceptance of the James Spence Medal.
- Born: 6 November 1926; Newcastle-under-Lyme
- Died: 10 December 2020 (aged 94)
- Education: Emmanuel College, University of Cambridge
- Scientific career
- Fields: Pediatrics, Nephrology
- Workplaces: Great Ormond Street Hospital, Evelina London Children's Hospital, Birmingham Children's Hospital, University of Birmingham

Richard Henry Reeve White (6 November 1926 in Newcastle-under-Lyme, 10 December 2020) was a paediatric nephrologist, (Note: A paediatric nephrologist is a doctor who treats children and young people with chronic and acute kidney disease, including the provision of dialysis and kidney transplantation.) emeritus Professor of Paediatric Nephrology from the University of Birmingham morphologist and archivist for British Association for Paediatric Nephrology.

White was known for pioneering research into renal disease in children that led him to develop a renal biopsy technique that was applied percutaneously with a local anesthetic. White was amongst the co-founders of the British Association for Paediatric Nephrology on 22 February 1973 and became the associations president between 1991 and 1994.

== Life ==
White was the youngest of three children. His father was Sydney White, who along with his brother ran a ladies and gentlemen's outfitters. His mother was Marion White née Leigh, who was a school teacher. After attending Newcastle-under-Lyme High School he matriculated at Emmanuel College at the University of Cambridge in 1944 to study medicine. In 1950, White graduated with a Bachelor of Medicine, Bachelor of Surgery (MB ChB).

White married Patricia White née Taverner a nurse, in 1952. The couple had two boys together.

== Career ==
White attended Guy's Hospital Medical School in London, where he completed his clinical training. His early training in a number of posts, enabled him to attain membership of the Royal College of Physicians. At the Royal Brompton Hospital White learned to do liver biopsy's. After deciding to become a paediatrician, he trained at the Great Ormond Street Hospital (GOSH) and Guy's Hospital's in London. At GOSH, he became interested in histology and particularly nephrotic syndrome in children. This was known as Bright's disease (Note: In this disease, the kidneys leak proteins that results in low-levels of Serum albumin in the blood. This results in the whole body swelling up due the retention of fluid. Other symptoms include high blood-pressure and heart disease.) that was first discovered by Richard Bright in 1824, but even after more than 100 years, there was very little known about it, particularly in children.

=== Needle biopsy ===
In 1954, after reading an article by Robert Kark and Robert Muehrcke titled: "Biopsy of kidney in prone position" White became interested in using a needle to do renal biopsy in children. As a senior registrar at GOSH, he attempted to introduce a new procedure using the biopsy needle but was unsuccessful due to the opposition from the paediatricians and pathologists, who believed it could only be done under general anaesthetic. However, Alan Moncrieff encouraged him to research the pathology of Liver biopsy's and managed to convince the medical staff that it could be successful. After meeting Hugh de Wardener from Charing Cross Hospital who was the first to conduct Renal biopsy's in adults in the uk, White immediately saw the potential in developing a percutaneous biopsy needle that could be applied with a local anesthetic for children that needed a renal biopsy. White compared the use of surgical biopsy techniques under a general anaesthetic against the percutaneous biopsy needle technique under a local anaesthetic in his MD thesis.

In November 1959, he able to use his new technique, when he performed a needle biopsy on a child who was under general anaesthetic at GOSH. This was the first time in Europe that it had been tried. In 1960, White was seconded to the Makerere University College medical school in Mulago Hospital in Kampala, Uganda for two years. While there, he continued working on the development of the percutaneous biopsy needle and developed a local anesthetic technique as a replacement for the general anaesthetic.

=== International Study ===
When he returned in 1962, he was appointed to a position at Evelina London Children's Hospital, part of Guy's Hospital where he introduced his new biopsy technique. While there, White formed a partnership with the nephrologist Stewart Cameron. They both worked together to provide a comprehensive nephrology service, Cameron offering the adult service and White offering the same service for children. Together they decided to conduct a clinicopathological study of children with nephrotic syndrome in the region southeast and southwest of the River Thames. The work started the embryo of a renal unit at Guy's Hospital that eventually led to the development of a world-class paediatric nephrology centre that was run by both Cameron and Chisholm S Ogg.

White's study attracted the attention of Henry Barnett, a paediatrician who worked in the Albert Einstein College of Medicine in the New York. Barnett along with Chester Edelmann and Ira Greifer created the International Study of Kidney Disease in Children in 1966 in the United States. A number of international collaborators were recruited and White was the British member. The study on glomerular disease continued in seminal studies of children in the 1970s and 1980s. White along with Renée Habib in France and Jacob Churg in the USA were the lead assessors and reported on the pathology of the biopsies. The seminal study was transformational in increasing understanding of histopathology and the treatment of glomerular disease in children. It also defined new techniques in the management of renal biopsy and promoted the use of clinical trials.

=== New department ===
In 1965, Douglas Hubble, who at the time was chairman of the British Paediatric Association believed there was a need to develop several paediatric specialities in Birmingham and invited White to work at the Birmingham Children's Hospital White was appointed to the position of senior lecturer, employed with the express purpose of developing a children's renal unit. At the time the service was fragmented, meaning that patients had to visit three hospitals that resulted in the doctors having to visit the three hospitals as well. These were the Heartlands Hospital for Kidney dialysis patients at the Queen Elizabeth Hospital at the kidney transplant patients and Nephrology patients at the Children's Hospital. To compound the problem, there was no paediatric nurses nor other consultants working in that speciality at the hospital at that time. Seeking to create a comprehensive renal centre in Birmingham hospital in the same manner as he did in Guys, he recruited a collaborator Elizabeth Ward, who would later found the British Kidney Patient Association in 1975. However, due to the level of bureaucracy at the hospital, it was a long time before the service was fully active. In 1975, White recruited Michael Hugh Winterborn as consultant paediatrician to create a dialysis service for children but transplantation was only occasionally taking place by adult surgeons, not paediatric surgeons. It was only in 1997, after White retired, was the goal of a fully comprehensive renal service finally achieved in Birmingham Hospital. In 1985, White became an honorary consultant. A year later in 1986 he was promoted to professor. White remained at the Birmingham Children's Hospital until 1991.

== James Spence Medal ==
In 1995, White was awarded the James Spence Medal by the British Paediatric Association for outstanding contributions to paediatric knowledge.

== Bibliography ==
- WHITE, RH (June 1963). "Observations on percutaneous renal biopsy in children". Archives of Disease in Childhood. 38 (199): 260–6. doi:10.1136/adc.38.199.260. PMC 2019029. PMID 14000354. S2CID 25274546.
- Stewart Cameron, J.; White, Richard H.R. (February 1965). "Selectivity of Proteinuria in Children with the Nephrotic Syndrome". The Lancet. 285 (7383): 463–465. doi:10.1016/S0140-6736(65)91593-X. PMID 14241888.
- Churg, Jacob; Habib, Renee; White, Richard H.R. (June 1970). "Pathology of the Nephrotic Syndrome in Children". The Lancet. 295 (7660): 1299–1302. doi:10.1016/S0140-6736(70)91905-7. PMID 4193942.
- White, R.H.R; Glasgow, E.F; Mills, R.J (June 1970). "Clinicopathological Study of Nephrotic Syndrome in Childhood". The Lancet. 295 (7661): 1353–1359. doi:10.1016/S0140-6736(70)91268-7. PMID 4194123.
