= June Lloyd, Baroness Lloyd of Highbury =

British paediatrician and life peer

Professor The Right Honourable The Baroness Lloyd of Highbury DBE FRCP FRCPE FRCGP
- Born: June Kathleen Lloyd; 1 January 1928; Gilgit, Kashmir
- Died: 28 June 2006 (aged 78); Aylesbury, Buckinghamshire, UK
- Education: University of Bristol
- Known for: Discovering that the rare metabolic disease oQ-betalipoproteinaemia could be avoided by the use of Vitamin E. The discovering the role of lipid metabolism For the establishment of the Royal College of Paediatrics and Child Health.
- Awards: Dame Commander of the Most Excellent Order of the British Empire, DSc and a Life peer in 1996
- Scientific career
- Fields: Metabolic disorders
- Workplaces: University of Birmingham, Great Ormond Street Hospital, Institute of Child Health, St George's Hospital Medical School

Member of the House of Lords
- Lord Temporal
- Life peerage 19 August 1996 – 28 June 2006

June Kathleen Lloyd, Baroness Lloyd of Highbury (1 January 1928 – 28 June 2006) was a British paediatrician and, in retirement, a cross bench member of the House of Lords. June Lloyd was a determined advocate for children's health and was instrumental in the establishment of the Royal College of Paediatrics and Child Health. In 1996, the college gained its royal status. She was also known for discovering that the damage caused to patients by the rare metabolic disease oQ-betalipoproteinaemia, that could be avoided by the use of Vitamin E. She was also known for discovering the role of lipid metabolism in health and disease in childhood, which was original and difficult to investigate at that time.

== Early life and education ==
Lloyd was born in Gilgit, Kashmir, where her father was a Major in the Royal Indian Army Service Corps. She remained in India until 1936, when her family returned to England. She was educated at the Royal High School in Bath, where she became head girl. She read medicine at the University of Bristol, winning honours with distinction and a gold medal.

== Career ==
She joined the Royal College of Physicians in 1954 and became one the youngest female members After further study in South Shields, Bristol, Plymouth, Oxford, Manchester and Durham, she became a research assistant to Otto Herbert Wolff in Birmingham. She taught at the University of Birmingham from 1958 to 1965, specialising in metabolic disorders in children, particularly diabetes mellitus and childhood obesity.

In 1965, she followed Wolff to Great Ormond Street Hospital in London, and the associated Institute of Child Health at University College London where she became a senior lecturer, later a reader and finally professor.

Lloyd was appointed professor of child health and head of a new department of paediatrics at St George's Hospital Medical School in London in 1975, and returned to Great Ormond Street in 1985 as Nuffield Professor of Child Health. She served with distinction on many committees. She was the first female president of the British Paediatric Association from 1988 to 1991, and was a vice-president of the Royal College of Physicians from 1992 to 1995.

=== Establishment of the RCPCH ===
Lloyd retired from practising medicine in 1992, but played a role in transforming the British Paediatric Association (abbr. BPA) into the Royal College of Paediatrics and Child Health. It was originally thought that Lloyd would become president of the BPA, after being honorary secretary for a number of years, but Lloyd believed that the paediatricians should have their own college. She was a member of an influential group with the BPA, which enabled her to push for the establishment of a new college. It was a contentious issue, as many in the profession believed it was not necessary, and there was serious differences of opinion, when looking in hindsight.

Sir Peter Tizard and his research group at Hammersmith Hospital, were one group of dissenting voices, who believed that Paediatrics should have the same intellectual footing for medicine for children, as medicine for adults, within general medicine, rather than a speciality. However, the argument was won. Roy Meadow would become the first president, but she would feature on the coat of arms of the new college, in which she is a supporter holding a staff of Aesculapius entwined with a double helix rather than the traditional snake. The other supporter was Thomas Phaire, whose Boke of Chyldren from 1545 was the first book on paediatrics in English, the crest is a baby, taken from the arms of the Foundling Hospital in Coram's Fields. Lloyd took over responsibility for training and standards for paediatricians that had previously been under the control of the Royal College of Physicians.

== Awards and honours ==
- Appointed a DBE in 1990
- Honorary DSc from Bristol University in 1991
- Honorary DSc from Birmingham University in 1993
- Awarded the James Spence Medal in 1993
- Life peer as Baroness Lloyd of Highbury, of Highbury in the London Borough of Islington in 1996.

== Later life and death ==
A severe stroke before her introduction to the House of Lords prevented her taking her seat until 1998. Her resulting disability left her unable to become an active member of the House. She had never married. Her brother, Philip Lloyd, was a Commander in the Royal Navy.

== Arms ==
Coat of arms of June Lloyd, Baroness Lloyd of Highbury
Coronet Coronet of a British Baron. Escutcheon Argent a cross engrailed and flory Sable between four Cornish choughs Proper. Supporters On either side a unicorn winged with dragon's wings Gules armed maned tail tufted and unguled Or. Orders The Order of the British Empire circlet as Dame Commander (DBE). FOR GOD AND THE EMPIRE
