= Ronald MacKeith =

British paediatrician, known for establishing the first cerebral palsy advice clinic

- MacKeith working in the garden.
- Born: 23 February 1908; Southampton, England
- Died: 30 October 1977 (aged 69)
- Education: The Queen's College, Oxford
- Scientific career
- Fields: Pediatrics
- Workplaces: Bellevue Hospital; St James' Hospital, Balham; Great Ormond Street Hospital; Guy's Hospital; Tavistock and Portman NHS Foundation Trust; Cassel Hospital

Ronald Charles MacKeith FRCP (23 February 1908 – 30 October 1977) was a British paediatrician. MacKeith was prolific in his endeavours. He was principally known for establishing the first cerebral palsy advice clinic, which was to become in 1964, the larger and more comprehensive Newcomen Centre for disabled children in Guy's Hospital. He founded the British Paediatric Neurology Association and the medical journal, Developmental Medicine & Child Neurology. His work gained recognition of the field of paediatric neurology as a science in several European countries.

== Life ==
MacKeith came from a very large family, who along with his twin sister, was third to last, in a family of 11 children. His childhood was seemingly serendipitous, having a father who was the GP Alexander Arthur MacKeith, and his mother, Alice, who was the daughter of a Pharmaceutical manufacturer.

He started his studies at King Edward VI School, Southampton, subsequently moving to The Queen's College, Oxford in 1926, receiving a Bachelor of Arts and then a Master of Arts by 1930. He was then offered a position to start his clinical studies at St Mary's Hospital Medical School in 1932. MacKeith was offered a position as house officer at St Mary's.

After working for a year, as a house officer, he spent the next year abroad as a Radcliffe travelling fellow. During that period he worked at the pediatric department of Bellevue Hospital in New York. During the interwar period, he held a number of junior positions, before finally being employed with Hector Charles Cameron at St James' Hospital, Balham towards the start of World War II. He spent the beginning of the war at St James, working through The Blitz, as Balham and indeed Wandsworth was being bombed extensively by Germany. In 1942 MacKeith decided to join up and from 1942 to 1945 was placed Royal Navy to work as a medical officer. He left at the end of the war with the rank of surgeon lieutenant commander.

After the war, he worked at Great Ormond Street Hospital as a supernumerary registrar, MacKeith was assigned a problem in paediatrics, by his consultant, Sir Alan Moncrieff. Moncrieff was looking for research to be conducted, on a previously researched problem of some importance, threadworn infestations in children. Although most failed to solve the problem, Moncrieff managed to, determining the epidemiology of threadworms and formulating a diagnosis, that is still valid today. He later conducted trials with the drug piperazine to determine its efficacy in treating the condition.

He later moved to Guy's hospital, where two of his brothers were trained. In 1958 he was appointed Children's Physician several days before the start of the National Health Service. It was Guys where MacKeith's enduring notability was established, when he persuaded the hospital to permit parental visiting every day, instead of the usual habit of twice per week. This became established practice in the United Kingdom and abroad. He established the first cerebral palsy advice clinic, which was to become in 1964, the larger and more comprehensive Newcomen Centre for disabled children in Guy's Hospital, becoming its first director, and later being joined by Mary Sheridan. The unit was established is a disused Victorian pub, located just outside the back gate. Access was by a steep winding stair, in which disabled children were carried, or occasionally climbed with dogged determination, which never curbed the enthusiasm of the staff. The centre eventually became too small and moved into Portakabins at the foot of Guys Tower. MacKeith, or Ronnie to his staff, remained there until he retired in 1974.

MacKeith's most significant influence on paediatric practice was his gentle, modern and compassionate treatment of disabled children while attending hospital and at home. He publicly supported a holistic inter-disciplinary approach, seeing the whole family, rather than the child and the disability. While formulating this approach, he wrote and collaborated on writing several books on the subject, along with several articles in Developmental Medicine & Child Neurology. During this period, he also consulted at the Cassel Hospital, being appointed in 1950 and appointed in 1960 to the Tavistock Clinic.

In the 1950s, MacKeith became director of the medical communications department of the National Spastics Society (now SCOPE), a position he held until his death. He founded the Cerebral Palsy Bulletin during February 1958, which later grew by 1962, into the Journal of Developmental Medicine and Child Neurology. He recorded a series of Monographs called the Clinics in Developmental Medicine that were recordings of his study group at Oxford called the International Study Group on Child Neurology. These became associated with the journal from 1958 to 1972 and were widely read in the Paediatric community.

== Bibliography ==
- The child and his symptoms: a comprehensive approach., John Apley, Ronald Charles MacKeith. Oxford, Edinburgh. Blackwell Scientific 1968. 2nd ed.
- A New Look at Child Health., Michael Joseph, Ronald Charles MacKeith. Pitman 1966
- Infant Feeding and Feeding Difficulties., Ronald Charles MacKeith, Christopher Bryan Somerset Wood. Edinburgh, New York., Churchill Livingstone 1977

== Awards ==
In 1972 he was awarded the James Spence Medal gold medal named in honour of the war paediatrician Professor Sir James Calvert Spence. In 1974 he received the Rosén von Rosenstein Medal of the Swedish Paediatric Association, named after the Swedish pioneer in paediatrics, Nils Rosén von Rosenstein. In 1975 he was awarded the Special Merit Award of the American Academy for Cerebral Palsy. MacKeith was awarded the Albrecht von Haller Medal from the University of Göttingen, that is named after the Albrecht von Haller, the father of modern physiology.
