= Kenneth Cross (physiologist) =

British physiologist

- Born: 26 March 1916; London, England
- Died: 10 October 1990 (aged 74)
- Education: St Mary's Hospital, London
- Awards: James Spence Medal
- Scientific career
- Fields: physiologist, foetal and neonatal physiology
- Workplaces: St Mary's Hospital, London, University of California, San Francisco

Kenneth William Cross FRCP (26 March 1916 – 10 October 1990) was a British physiologist who was principally known for his fundamental contributions to the physiology of newborns that are relevant to paediatric practice.

== Life ==
Kenneth Cross was educated at St Paul's School, London from 1930 to 1935 and then at St Mary's Hospital, London where he won a Moran Scholarship, a Rugby Scholarship, that was established by Lord Moran Charles Wilson, 1st Baron Moran as a way of picking up the best students for medicine. Within 2 years, Cross had passed the membership examination of the college, in 1940. After several junior house appointments at the beginning of World War II, Cross served in the emergency medical service. Although considered combative by nature, Cross was a self confessed pacifist by conviction, and even though he spent time with the Friends' Ambulance Unit in China during World War II, Cross rarely spoke about the work.

Cross was married twice. His first wife, Joyce Wilson, was depressed and died by suicide in 1970. Cross was also depressed himself, but he usually managed to mask his mood in public, albeit at the cost of worse symptoms at home. His second wife was Sheila Cross.

== Career ==
After returning from China, Cross abandoned a potential career as a physician, to become a physiologist working in the physiology department at St Mary's Hospital. In 1948, he started to research foetal and neonatal physiology for the ventilation of the newborn baby. He was one of the first to apply physiological techniques, to the problem of resuscitating newborn babies. Through this work he became a leading member of a group of physiologists and paediatricians who founded the Neonatal Society in 1959. Cross's life work became neonatal research.

Cross was promoted to the academic rank of reader in 1952. Cross spent a year in America in 1958–1959 at the Cardiovascular Research Institute located in the University of California, San Francisco. Working alongside Julius H. Comroe Jr., Cross helped organize and establish the study into neonatal research that later grew into one of the largest paediatric research groups in America. Upon returning from the US, Cross moved to London Hospital Medical College with a promotion to Professor of Physiology in 1960, a post he held until 1981.

In 1963 he became an honorary director of a Medical Research Council group on the respiration and energy metabolism in the newborn. During 1973, he organized the Joseph Barcroft Centenary meeting for The Physiological Society. In 1974 he gave the Bertram Louis Abrahams lecture called Investigating the newborn: the ethical imperative

== Contributions ==
Cross as an individual, had no time for fools or knaves, and was considered a rather forthright character who didn't value position, but did value and respect people. This was possibly the reason he was passed over for membership of the Royal Society, a position he clearly deserved. Indeed, the physiologist Arthur Huggett later stated, that on his own membership of the society, was in recognition of work carried out by Kenneth Cross.

Cross contributions to medical science before 1957, specifically to physiology of the new-born, were so many and so fundamental that it was a surprise that his first proposal for membership to the Royal College of Paediatrics and Child Health, formerly the British Paediatric Association (BPA) was not automatic. Indeed, when his name was put forward for election, dissenting voices stalled the proposal as they saw no reason to include a physiologist. When he was finally elected to the learned society in 1957 on the second proposal for election, Cross wasn't having an easy professional life. Paediatricians were slow to recognize the importance of his work. Both paediatricians and physiologists found it impossible to believe that the type of fundamental research conducted by Cross, could be done on the new-born. Indeed, as Professor Otto Herbert Wolff stated in his speech, when awarding the James Spence Medal to Cross,

that Cross was told by his professor St Mary's that now he was turned down by the BPA that it was time he stopped playing with babies and got down to some proper physiology.

Cross's approach to physiology was simple. Once practical solutions were developed, they were turned into a process that could be applied to everyday clinical problems. Cross operated with an exceedingly high standard of approach to ethical standards and used this approach to train a large number of high quality research students, many who would later become neonatologist's themselves.

== Awards ==
On 28 March 1979 Cross was awarded the James Spence Medal, named after Professor Sir James Calvert Spence, and is the highest award of the British Paediatric Association.
