= John Emery (paediatrician) =

British paediatrician (1915–2000)

- Born: 3 October 1915; Aylburton, Gloucestershire, England
- Died: 1 May 2000 (aged 84); Aylburton
- Education: University of Bristol
- Known for: Britain's leading scientist on cot death
- Scientific career
- Fields: Paediatrics, Pathology
- Workplaces: University of Sheffield, Bristol Royal Hospital for Children

John Lewis Emery (3 October 1915 – 1 May 2000) was a British-born paediatric pathologist and emeritus professor at the University of Sheffield. Emery was most notable for being one of the founding fathers of paediatric pathology in the country, and for conducting research into haematology, developmental anatomy, congenital deformities, particularly hydrocephalus, and was probably Britain's leading scientist in the subject of unexplained infant deaths, or cot death.

== Life ==
Emery's early life was spent at Aylburton, close to the Forest of Dean, where his father was headmaster at the village school. When Emery was 8 years old, the family moved to a new house, where in later life Emery spent most of his time. Emery's early school was difficult, as he was probably dyslexic but still managed to gain access to place at Lydney Grammar School for his early schooling. At the end of this early schooling, Emery faced the hard choice in choosing a career direction, of either going into church, becoming an artist, or a doctor. Fortunately Emery choose the latter, and accepted a position at University of Bristol, qualifying in 1939 with a MB ChB, with an interest in children diseases.

Emery died in a fire, at his Aylburton, Gloucestershire home, trying to rescue his dog.

== Career ==
Emery began his career at the Bristol Royal Hospital for Children. During World War II, the hospital was damaged by bombing, Emery who was a paediatric Senior registrar at the time, was in charge for a while, when it was evacuated to Weston-Super-Mare. During World War II, Emery registered as a conscientious objector and drove ambulances. Knowing that being an objector was likely to jeopardise any future opportunities in paediatrics, Emery instead moved into the field of pathology. In 1942, Emery was appointed to the position of lecturer in pathology at the Bristol Royal Hospital for Children.

After the war, in 1947, Emery was accepted to the position of Consultant Pathologist at the Sheffield Children's Hospital, that was a newly created post. In 1972, the University of Sheffield granted to Emery the title of Associate University Professor, that was considered a rare honour. Emery worked at the Sheffield Children's Hospital from 1947 until his retirement in 1980. Subsequently, Emery was made emeritus professor at the University of Sheffield.

In 1999, Emery was awarded an honorary degree from the University of Sheffield.

== Travels ==
In 1975 at the invitation of the White House, Emery travelled to America to conducted a research project to survey the community bereavement service in relation to cot death in seven U.S. states. In 1986, Emery travelled to New Zealand to research primary childcare services for the New Zealand minister of health Michael Bassett and the Plunket Society. A follow-up research project and survey produced information that lead to the back-to-sleep campaign that reduced the number of cot deaths in New Zealand by half. A similar survey was undertaken by Emery in Australia.

== Contributions ==
Emery's early working career at Sheffield Children's Hospital, was involved in research into haematology and developmental anatomy, i.e. lung development and congenital deformities in young children, i.e. spina bifida and hydrocephalus, neoplasms, and tuberculosis. Perhaps due to the loss of his infant child, Emery started focusing his research on sudden infant death syndrome (SIDS) and continued to work on it during the period of his retirement. Writing in 1989 Emery stated:

As infant mortality diminished in the first half of this century, more attention was given to those babies dying unexpectedly and with less florid disease. The skills required to study such deaths had not, however, been developed, and the result was that diagnoses ranged from pneumonitis to suffocation. The latter label led to parents being interrogated by the police and to social stigma. In 1969, a group in Seattle, believing that all of these were natural deaths, recommended that they should be registered as the sudden infant death syndrome (SIDS).

Emery, however, believed that SIDS was caused by many different factors, and even after conducting many postmortem examinations and confidential enquiries, he found that 17% of deaths diagnosed as SIDS remained completely unexplained. To reduce the number of SIDS cases, Emery instigated a series of measures. By identifying babies at risk, Emery established a health visitor programme that signalled those symptoms to the health community, in a manner which might auger cot death in infants. In this manner, Emery and his team in Sheffield, were able to achieve a substantial reduction in the number of infant deaths in the city.

Emery was extremely prolific in the number of learned societies he created. He created the International Paediatric Pathology Association, the Paediatric Pathology Society and the Developmental Pathology Society. Emery was a founding member of the Society for Research into Hydrocephalus and Spina Bifida. Emery was also a member of the committee of the Foundation for the Study of Infant Deaths that later became The Lullaby Trust.

In 1988, Emery was the Frederick Still lecturer of the British Paediatric Association, later called the Royal College of Paediatrics and Child Health.

== Awards ==
Emery was awarded the James Spence Medal of the British Paediatric Association in 1987.
