= Peter Tizard =

British paediatrician (1916–1993)

Sir Peter Tizard
- Born: 1 April 1916; Hampstead
- Died: 27 October 1993 (aged 77)
- Education: Oriel College, Oxford
- Awards: Knight Bachelor, Academy of Sciences Leopoldina
- Scientific career
- Fields: Pediatrics
- Workplaces: Middlesex Hospital, Great Ormond Street Hospital, St Mary's Hospital, London, Harvard Medical School, Hammersmith Hospital

Sir John Peter Mills Tizard FRCP (1 April 1916, London – 27 October 1993, Hillingdon) was a British paediatrician and professor at the University of Oxford. Tizard was principally notable for important research into neonatology and paediatric neurology and being a founder member of the Neonatal Society in 1959. Tizard was considered the most distinguished academic children's physician of his generation.

== Life ==
Tizard was the eldest of three sons of Sir Henry Tizard KCB, who was the chief scientific adviser to the government at the outbreak of the World War II. Tizard came from a prominent intellectual family – his father, his grandfather and his younger brother were all members of the Royal Society. Indeed, Sir Henry Tizard was the man who many believed was responsible for establishing the radar network that saved Great Britain during the Battle of Britain.

Tizard was educated at Rugby School and Oriel College, Oxford. He then qualified in medicine at Middlesex Hospital in 1941.

He had married (Elizabeth) Joy Taylor in 1945; they had two sons and a daughter.

== Career ==
During and after World War II, in the years 1942–1946, Tizard served in the Royal Army Medical Corps undertaking general duties in North Africa and Sicily. Tizard later worked as medical specialist in France, Holland and Germany. After the war in 1947, he was appointed to the Great Ormond Street Hospital, as a registrar then a pathologist. In 1949, unable to secure the position of Consultant at Great Ormond, Tizard was promoted to Consultant, and trained as a paediatrician, while working with Reginald Lightwood at St Mary's Hospital, London and Paddington Green Children's Hospital. After two years, Tizard went to America on a research fellowship as Research Fellow in Pediatrics, at the Harvard Medical School, working with Bronson Crothers. In 1954, he was appointed Reader in paediatrics to the Institute of Child Health, in charge of the neonatal unit and an honorary Consultant paediatrician to Hammersmith Hospital, In 1964 was appointed Professor of Paediatrics at the Royal Postgraduate Medical School, University of London, heading the neonatal research unit. In 1972, he became the first Professor of Paediatrics at the University of Oxford, specifically Regius Professor of Physic, which came with a fellowship to Jesus College, Oxford. Tizard replaced his old colleague George Pickering.

Between 1970 and 1971, Tizard was President of the European Paediatric Research Society. From 1972 to 1983, Tizard was an honorary Consultant Children's Physician at the Oxfordshire Health Authority. Between 1975 and 1978, Tizard was President of the Neonatal Society. In 1982 Tizard was recognised by the country and Knighted and became a Knight Bachelor. From 1982 to 1985, Tizard was President of the British Paediatric Association.

Tizard retired in 1983. He died on 27 October 1993.

== Neonatal unit ==
At Hammersmith Hospital, Tizard worked to build up an academic neonatal unit that was a pioneer in the establishment of neonatal care in the UK, and established the scientific basis for the development of such units. To prepare for this endeavour, Tizard spent took a sabbatical as a Nuffield Foundation Medical Fellow 1951, spending a year with Geoffrey S. Dawes, the physiologist at the Nuffield Institute for Medical Research in Oxford and who considered to be the foremost international authority on fetal and neonatal physiology. In this manner, Tizard changed, what was then neonatal care, into applied physiology, that was unique in medicine, at the time.

Tizard recruited a number of brilliant, and now well known individuals. Wilfrid Payne was the first, who had retired and then became a skilled adviser to Tizard. Michael Dawkins, a paediatric pathologist was recruited next. Albert Claneaux, who was Dawkings predecessor at the Institute, had collaborated with Tizard, and gave the first definitive account of the epidemiology of Intraventricular haemorrhage in newborn infants. Dawkins had been working at the Nuffield Institute with David Hull and had established the reason for the response to cold in the human infant. Lawrence Goldie, a psychoanalyst with a specialism in physiology and Pamela Davies were next. Davies was given the task of following up on surviving infants. In collaboration with Goldie, they described the electroencephalographic characteristics in the immature brain.

Tizard did more than anybody else in the paediatric medical community to put paediatrics on an equal footing with medicine for adults, that was based on knowledge, as opposed to acquired experience, as Tizard's group at Hammersmith Hospital had sufficient intellectual stamina to acquire that knowledge through research. Therefore, it was a disappointment when the British Paediatric Association asserted its independence, by establishing paediatrics as a speciality, and breaking away from the Royal College of Physicians, rather than the hard won position that Tizard's group had won for it, within general medicine.

== Character ==
Although unable to suffer fools or the pretentious, Tizard was known to enjoy the position of power and responsibility. On first meeting, Tizard was often considered brutally frank and forthright in conversation, but was generally supportive, and was at this best working with patients, whom he treated with respect and dignity. Like most men who were strong and assertive, Tizard made both friends and enemies, but was able to form life long friends, and was considered brave and persistent, but fair minded. Tizard was considered a good companion, who could tell a good story.

== Awards and honours ==
Tizard received many awards and honours throughout this lifetime, but he took particular pleasure in being:

- elected to the prestigious German Scientific Society known as the Academy of Sciences Leopoldina.
- elected Master of the Worshipful Society of Apothecaries.
- awarded the James Spence Medal of the British Paediatric Association in 1986.
