= Frances Cowan =

British neurologist

- Awards: James Spence Medal

Academic background
- Education: University of Oslo

Frances Cowan is a British perinatal neurologist. She researches the causes, diagnosis and treatment of perinatal brain injury, including the use of hypothermia to treat babies deprived of oxygen during birth. She developed the Hammersmith Neurological Examination Scheme, which is used around the world. In 2018 she was awarded the James Spence Medal by the Royal College of Paediatrics and Child Health.

== Education and career ==
Cowan has a PhD from the University of Oslo. She holds a visiting professor position at the University of Bristol, is a Clinical Senior Lecturer in Perinatal Neurology at Imperial College London. In addition she is an honorary consultant at Queen Charlotte’s and Chelsea Hospital and Chelsea and Westminster Hospital.

Cowan's research focuses on the causes, diagnosis and treatment of perinatal brain injury. She began in the 1980s, using ultrasound to look for patterns of brain injury in infants, and moving on to the use of brain magnetic resonance imaging in the 1990s, to augment clinical and ultrasound examinations. The Hammersmith Neurological Examination scheme, developed by Cowan and Lilly Dubowitz at Hammersmith hospital in the 1990s, is now used internationally. Cowan was part of a Bristol University team, led by Professor Marianne Thoresen, that showed that oxygen-deprived babies that were provided with cooling therapy were less likely to develop epilepsy later in life.

Cowan is a scientific advisor for the Lothian Birth-Cohort studies, at the University of Edinburgh, and has trained researchers in Uganda and Armenia on the use of hypothermic treatment for brain injury in babies.

== Recognition ==
In 2018, Cowan was awarded the James Spence Medal by the Royal College of Paediatrics and Child Health "for her contribution to clinical and academic perinatal neurology".

== Selected publications ==
- Arthur P. C. Spencer; Richard Lee‐Kelland; Jonathan C. W. Brooks; Jary, Sally; James Tonks; Cowan, Frances M.; Marianne Thoresen; Ela Chakkarapani (2022). "Brain volumes and functional outcomes in children without cerebral palsy after therapeutic hypothermia for neonatal hypoxic‐ischaemic encephalopathy". Developmental Medicine & Child Neurology. 65 (3): 367–375. doi:10.1111/dmcn.15369. PMID 35907252. Wikidata Q133818598.
- Xun Liu; Sally Jary; Cowan, Frances M.; Thoresen, Marianne (2017). "Reduced infancy and childhood epilepsy following hypothermia-treated neonatal encephalopathy". Epilepsia. 58 (11): 1902–1911. doi:10.1111/epi.13914. PMID 28961316. Wikidata Q47256947.
- Gale, Chris; Yevgeniy Statnikov; Sena Jawad; Sabita N Uthaya; Neena Modi; Brain Injuries expert working group (2017). "Neonatal brain injuries in England: population-based incidence derived from routinely recorded clinical data held in the National Neonatal Research Database". Archives of Disease in Childhood. Fetal and Neonatal Edition. 103 (4): F301–F306. doi:10.1136/archdischild-2017-313707. PMC 6047140. PMID 29180541. Wikidata Q47405956.
- Miriam Martinez-Biarge; Bregant, Tina; Courtney J. Wusthoff; Andrew T. M. Chew; Jesus Diez-Sebastian; Mary A. Rutherford; Cowan, Frances M. (2012). "White matter and cortical injury in hypoxic-ischemic encephalopathy: antecedent factors and 2-year outcome". The Journal of Pediatrics. 161 (5): 799–807. doi:10.1016/j.jpeds.2012.04.054. PMID 22682614. Wikidata Q48478849.
