= Anne Greenough =

Pediatrician

Professor Anne Greenough FRCP

Professor of Neonatology and Clinical Respiratory Physiology, King's College London

Personal details
- Born: August 1954 (age 71) Newcastle upon Tyne, England
- Occupation: Neonatologist

Anne Greenough (born August 1954 in Newcastle upon Tyne) is a British neonatologist and is most notable for research into clinical and academic neonatology through work relating to the origins, markers and management of chronic lung disease following preterm birth. Greenough is Professor of Neonatology and Clinical Respiratory Physiology at King's College London. She was awarded the James Spence Medal, the Royal College of Paediatrics ad Child Health's (RCPCH's) highest honour, in 2017.

== Life ==
Greenough was born in Newcastle upon Tyne in 1954, and was educated at the University of Cambridge and University College London. She is a neonatologist and is most notable for research into clinical and academic neonatology through work relating to the origins, markers and management of chronic lung disease following preterm birth. Greenough is Professor of Neonatology and Clinical Respiratory Physiology at King's College London.

Greenough has published books on congenital, perinatal and neonatal infections, and on neonatal respiratory disorders. She has held a number of positions, including Chair of the National Institute for Health Research (NIHR) Paediatrics (non medicines) Specialty Group, and was RCPCH Vice President for Science and Research until 2019. She has published hundreds of papers and superviser thirty doctoral students.

== Honours ==
Greenough was awarded the James Spence Medal, the Royal College of Paediatrics ad Child Health's highest honour, in 2017. She received the 2017 George N. Papanicolaou Humanitarian Award.

== Bibliography ==
- Greenough, Anne; Milner, Anthony D (2003). Neonatal respiratory disorders. London, New York: Oxford University Press. ISBN 9781444113921. OCLC 646068407.
- Greenough, Anne; Osborne, John; Sutherland, Sheena (1992). Congenital, perinatal, and neonatal infections. Edinburgh: Churchill Livingstone. ISBN 0443045089.
- Greenough, Anne (1999). Hot topics in neonatology. European Journal of Pediatrics, vol. 158, Suppl. 1. Heidelberg, Berlin: Springer. OCLC 76085679.

The following are proceedings,

- Greenough, Anne (2004). UK hot topics in neonatology. Stockholm: Taylor & Francis. OCLC 249385106.
