= Jim Appleyard =

British physician and medical reformer

William James "Jim" Appleyard (23 October 1935 – 29 January 2022) was a British paediatrician and medical reformer who served as a president of the World Medical Association.

== Early life and education ==
William James Appleyard was born in 1935. His father, Rollo, was a lawyer. He attended Canford School before studying medicine at Exeter College, Oxford, and Guy's Hospital, London, where he met his wife, Liz, who became a dentist.

== Career ==
Appleyard's career as a reformer began after completing a year of paediatric training in Louisville, Kentucky, in the late 1960s. Contrasting the structured American system with what he saw as the "exploitative and chaotic" conditions in the UK, where junior doctors often worked 120-hour weeks, he became a vocal critic of the National Health Service (NHS).

From 1971, Appleyard was a consultant at the Kent and Canterbury Hospital, where he rejected hierarchical structures in favour of team-based care. In 1972, he oversaw the opening of the Mary Sheridan Centre for children with disabilities. In 1973, he expanded the hospital's neonatal facilities into one of the region's first special care units.

As chairman of the UK Junior Hospital Doctors national committee, Appleyard publicly accused senior consultants of exploitation. He later became chairman of the BMA's Representative Body, leading contract negotiations with the government. He also served on the General Medical Council (GMC).

In 2003, Appleyard served as president of the World Medical Association and oversaw revisions to the Declaration of Helsinki, which governs ethical principles for medical research. He also served as president of the International College of Person-Centred Medicine and the International Association of Medical Colleges.

== Personal life ==
Appleyard was married to Liz, a dentist, and they had three children. Appleyard died of colon cancer at the age of 86.
