= Catherine Law =

British medical researcher

Catherine Law CBE
- Awards: James Spence Medal (2020)
- Scientific career
- Fields: Medicine
- Institutions: University of Southampton; University College London

Catherine Law CBE is a British paediatrician and epidemiologist. She is an emeritus professor at the UCL Great Ormond Street Institute of Child Health. She received the James Spence Medal, the highest honour of the Royal College of Paediatrics and Child Health, in 2020.

== Life ==
Law completed her medical studies at the University of London in 1979 and trained as a paediatrician in London. She finished a doctorate at the UCL Institute of Child Health and subsequently travelled to the United States to pursue postdoctoral research at the Johns Hopkins School of Hygiene and Public Health. She returned to the United Kingdom in 1987 as an academic at the University of Southampton, where she remained until she moved to the UCL Institute of Child Health in 2003. There, she eventually became a Professor of Public Health and Epidemiology and Vice Dean for Research in the Faculty of Population Health Sciences. Her research has focused on childhood obesity, growth and inequalities in children's health, and the applications of medical research to public policy.

From 2005 to 2015, she served as the inaugural chair of the NICE Public Health Advisory Committee. She is a member of the World Health Organization Europe Advisory Committee on Health Research. She was appointed CBE in 2014 for services to public health and is an elected Fellow of the Academy of Medical Sciences. In 2009, she was awarded the Milroy Lectureship, and in 2020 she received the James Spence Medal, the highest honour of the Royal College of Paediatrics and Child Health. As of 2025, she is an emeritus professor of UCL.
