= Deirdre Kelly (hepatologist) =

Irish clinician, academic, and author

Deirdre Kelly CBE
- Born: India
- Occupations: Clinician, academic and author
- Awards: The Lunar Medal, Lunar Society; Commander of the British Empire, Government of the United Kingdom, James Spence Medal

Academic background
- Education: BA; MB BCh BAO; MD
- Alma mater: Trinity College Dublin

Deirdre Anne Kelly CBE DL is an Irish clinician, academic, and author. She is Professor of Paediatric Hepatology at the University of Birmingham and Clinical Lead for National Paediatric Hepatitis C Operational Delivery Network. She chairs the Board of Pension Trustees at the General Medical Council and is a non-executive director at NHS Blood and Transplant.

Kelly has edited books including Atlas of Pediatric Hepatology and Diseases of the Liver and Biliary System in Children. Her research is focused in the fields of the genetics of neonatal liver disease, management and treatment of pediatric liver diseases, particularly focusing on auto-immune liver disease, biliary atresia, cholestatic liver disease, and long-term outcome of liver transplantation in children.

Kelly held the Deputy Editorship of the health journal Liver Transplantation from 2015 to 2020.

== Education ==
Kelly completed her Bachelor of Arts from Trinity College, University of Dublin in 1971, where she also earned an MB BCh BAO degree in 1973. In 1979, she completed her Doctor of Medicine degree from the University of Dublin. She then acquired accreditation for General Medicine and Gastroenterology from JCHMT in 1984. In 1990, she was awarded a fellowship at the Royal College of Physicians of Ireland, and in 1995 fellowship from the Royal College of Physicians, London followed by a fellowship at the Royal College of Paediatrics and Child Health in 1997.

== Career ==
In 1976 Kelly joined Sir Patrick Dun's Hospital as a Research Registrar and worked there until 1978. From 1978 to 1980 she performed duties as a Medical Registrar at St Vincent's Hospital. She then joined Trinity College Dublin as a Lecturer of Clinical Medicine in 1980 and served until 1982. In 1982, she joined Royal Free Hospital as a Wellcome Research Fellow until 1984. She re-trained in paediatrics and worked as a Paediatric Registrar at the Queen Elizabeth Hospital in Hackney and then at the Hospital for Sick Children Great Ormonde Street from 1984 to 1987. She was a lecturer in Child Health at St Bartholomew's Hospital, in 1987. In the same year she joined the University of Nebraska–Lincoln as an assistant professor in Paediatrics and served up until 1988. In 1989 she was appointed as Director of the Liver Unit and Consultant Paediatric Hepatologist at Birmingham Women's and Children's NHS Foundation Trust. She is Professor of Paediatric Hepatology at the University of Birmingham, from 2001.

Kelly was a founding member of the International Pediatric Transplant Association (IPTA) and served as its vice president from 1998 to 2002 and President from 2002 to 2005. She was the President of the British Society of Paediatric Gastroenterology & Hepatology (2004–07) and the European Society of Paediatric Gastroenterology & Hepatology (2007–10). She is the Chairperson of the Public Affairs Committee at the European Society of Paediatric Gastroenterology Hepatology Nutrition since 2017. She is the Clinical Lead for the National Paediatric Hepatitis C Operational Delivery Network at NHSE since 2021.

She has had a number of public sector appointments focusing on standards in healthcare and patient safety. She has served on the Boards of the Healthcare Commission (2007–09), the Care Quality Commission (2008–13), the Health Research Authority (2015–18) and the General Medical Council (2013–20) and is a Non-executive Director at NHS Blood & Transplant since 2020. She currently chairs the Board of Pension Trustees at the General Medical Council.

She has been a Deputy Lieutenant of the West Midlands since 2008.

== Research ==
Kelly has authored numerous publications including articles in peer-reviewed journals. Her research interests lie in the fields of the genetics of neonatal liver disease, management and treatment of pediatric liver disease, particularly focusing on auto-immune liver disease, viral hepatitis, biliary atresia, cholestatic liver disease and the long term outcome following liver transplantation.

=== Biliary atresia ===
Kelly conducted research on pediatric hepatic diseases with a particular focus on biliary atresia. She advocated centralizing the Kasai Portoenterostomy (a surgical procedure) for the treatment of Biliary Atresia in infants, citing its ability to greatly enhance bile drainage along with keeping serum bilirubin levels within range, thus improving the patient's quality of life.

She evaluated the success ratio of kasai portoenterostomy and demonstrated a higher success and overall survival rate within children who were treated at high volume centers compared to those who were treated at low volume centers.

She was also part of the team that analyzed the handling of Biliary Atresia patients in England and Wales from 1999 to 2002 in supra-regional centers. The study involved 148 infants and the results showed that out of 96% of the infants that underwent kasai portoenterostomy, 57% of them recovered from jaundice, while the remaining 37% had to go for a liver transplant. The 4-year survival rate improved to 89%, indicating that surgical outcomes can be enhanced by centralizing care to supra-regional centers. She also identified the need for prompt transfer of care from pediatric to adult-oriented liver treatment centers for patients who have successfully achieved adulthood. She evaluated the prospects of conventional visual screening and systematic screening of babies with neonatal jaundice and suggested that conventional visual screening is not as effective, due to its ability to yield numerous false positives.

=== Auto-immune liver disease ===
Kelly studied auto-immune disease and identified a female predominance in both of its types i.e. (AIH type 1) and (AIH type 2). She stressed the importance of prompt medical attention with medication including azathioprine and steroids and advocated for long-term treatment, due to the possibility of the disease relapsing at any given time. She also studied the outcomes of liver transplantation in children with autoimmune sclerosing cholangitis(AISC) and autoimmune hepatitis(AIH). In a separate study, she demonstrated that AIH patients who underwent a liver transplant took a longer time to recover compared to those who didn't. She stressed the fact that while liver transplantation is an effective therapeutic option for progressive AISC and AIH, the potential relapse of the primary auto-immune process greatly reduces its outcomes.

=== Liver failure ===
Kelly has conducted research on liver failure with a particular focus on pediatric liver failure. She studied drug-related hepatotoxicity and its role in causing acute liver failure in children, and discouraged the use of acetaminophen (as it accounts for 15% of all ALF in children in the US and UK) along with other drugs to prevent acute liver failure. She also termed paracetamol overdose as one of the leading causes of acute liver failure along with other inevitable natural factors such as having a genetic metabolic liver disease.

=== Liver transplantation ===
Kelly's unit in Birmingham was one of the first groups to work on liver transplantation for infants. She has evaluated the long-term benefits of infant liver transplantation, quality of life, the natural history of graft injury and defined the effect of the transition to adult services on long-term survival.

She has played an integral part in clarifying the optimal use of post-transplant immunosuppression through her role as Chief Investigator of multi-centre clinical trials including the only definitive randomised study of tacrolimus and cyclosporine in children.

== Awards and honors ==
- 1996 – Midlands Woman of Achievement, Women's Awards
- 2011 – Alumni Award, Trinity College Dublin
- 2012 – The Lunar Medal, The Lunar Society
- 2016 – Distinguished Service Award, European Society of Paediatric Gastroenterology, Hepatology & Nutrition
- 2016 – Commander of the British Empire, Government of the United Kingdom
- 2019 – Recognition Award, European Association of Liver Disease
- 2021 – Pioneer in Liver Transplantation, IPTA
- 2022 – Distinguished Service Award, British Society of Paediatric Gastroenterology, Hepatology & Nutrition
- 2023 – Appointed to join the Board of Directors of Guy's and St Thomas' NHS Foundation Trust.
- 2025 – James Spence Medal

== Personal life ==
Kelly married Ian Byatt in 1997. She has two sons.

== Bibliography ==
=== Books ===
- Atlas of Pediatric Hepatology (2018) ISBN 9783319695280
- Diseases of the Liver and Biliary System in Children (2018) ISBN 9781405163347

=== Selected articles ===
- Beath SV, Brook G, Kelly DA Cash AJ, McMaster P, Mayer AD, Buckels JA. 1993 Successful liver transplantation in babies under 1 year. British Medical Journal 307: 825–828.
- McKiernan, P. J., Baker, A. J., & Kelly, D. A. (2000). The frequency and outcome of biliary – atresia in the UK and Ireland. The Lancet, 355(9197), 25–29.
- Kelly D, Jara P, Rodeck B, Manzanares J, Reding R. Tacrolimus and steroids versus ciclosporin microemulsion, steroids and azathioprine in children undergoing liver transplantation: randomized multicentre trial. Lancet 2004; 364: 1054–1061
- Evans HM, Kelly DA, McKiernan PJ, Hubscher S. Progressive histological damage in liver allografts following pediatric liver transplantation. Hepatology 2006 May; 43(5): 1109–1117
- Hartley, J. L., Davenport, M., & Kelly, D. A. (2009). Biliary atresia. The Lancet, 374(9702), 1704–1713.
- Williams, R., Aspinall, R., Bellis, M., Camps-Walsh, G., Cramp, M., Dhawan, A., Kelly DA, ... & Smith, T. (2014). Addressing liver disease in the UK: a blueprint for attaining excellence in health care and reducing premature mortality from lifestyle issues of excess consumption of alcohol, obesity, and viral hepatitis. The Lancet, 384(9958), 1953–1997.
- Sagar N, Leithead JA, Lloyd C, Smith M, Gunson BK, Adams DH, Kelly D, Ferguson JW. Pediatric liver transplant recipients who undergo transfer to the adult healthcare service have good long-term outcomes. Am J Transplant 2015 Jul;15(7)1864–1873.
