= Neil Gordon (paediatrician) =

Scottish paediatrician (1918–2010)

Neil Gordon FRCP FRCPE
- Gordon in 1945
- Born: 28 May 1918; Edinburgh, Scotland
- Died: 9 November 2010 (aged 92)
- Education: University of Edinburgh
- Awards: FRCP Edin, FRCP
- Scientific career
- Fields: Pediatrics, Neurology
- Workplaces: Royal Infirmary of Edinburgh, Saint Mary's Hospital, Manchester, University of California

Neil Simson Gordon (28 May 1918 – 9 November 2010) was a Scottish paediatric neurologist, who conducted research into eponymic diseases including chronic handicaps, cerebral palsy, epilepsy, disorders of languages and learning disabilities. Gordon was one of the first to initiate comprehensive multidisciplinary assessment centres for children. He has been described as the "wise grand old man of UK paediatric neurology" and first specialist paediatric neurologist to be appointed outside London.

== Life ==
Gordon was born in Edinburgh on 28 May 1918 to Agnes Theodora (née Henderson), a farmer's daughter, and Ronald Grey Gordon, a distinguished doctor. Gordon's brother was Ian Gordon, a paediatric radiologist. Gordon received his early education at Charterhouse School, before going on to study medicine at the University of Edinburgh and the Royal Infirmary of Edinburgh. He received his PhD from the University of Edinburgh in 1943 for his research on vitamin E. At the start of World War II, and after applying and failing to achieve a position at Great Ormond Street Hospital, Gordon joined the RAF Medical Service in 1941. He worked in a mobile field hospital in various locations including North Africa, Italy and France.

In 1942, Gordon married Valerie Margaret Gray, and together they had a son and daughter. His wife predeceased him and he was survived by their children.

== Career ==
In 1946, Gordon was demobilised and upon returning to civilian life, became a supernumery registrar at the Royal Infirmary. After two years, Gordon left the position, to take a number of increasingly senior positions at National Hospital for Neurology and Neurosurgery, moving through the medical ranks, becoming house physician, then assistant registrar then registrar. During this period, Gordon spent a year, working as a lecturer at the University of California in San Francisco.

In 1955, Gordon moved to Saint Mary's Hospital, Manchester, as a Senior registrar in neurology, under the notable neurologist Denis Briton. In 1958, he was appointed as Consultant paediatric neurologist at both Royal Manchester Children's Hospital and Booth Hall Children's Hospital.

== Membership ==
In the 1970s, Gordon was focused on the speech pathology and attended a committee that was enquiring into the work of speech therapists, who had the time seemed to work exclusively only on adult speech problems. Through this work he was made an honorary fellow of the College of Speech Therapists, later called the Royal College of Speech and Language Therapists.

Gordon was a founding member of the British Paediatric Neurology Association in 1975 From 1958, Gordon attended meetings of the UK Paediatric Neurology group in St Edmund Hall, Oxford and the group slowly formed the idea of establishing the first association of that type in the UK. Gordon work was fundamental in establishing the Association, and for his efforts was elected to be the first President of the Association, a position he held for 6 years. Through work to establish the association, other European countries took notice and established similar associations. These were brought together, starting in 1971, in a federal structure by 1980, to become the European Federation of European societies of paediatric neurology in 1980, that would later become the European Paediatric Neurology Society. Gordon became president of the organisation in 1980 for a two-year term. Gordon was also on the board of the International Child Neurology Association.

== Contributions ==
Gordon was interested in rare diseases, and this was reflected in his publications, and eventually became a consultant in rare diseases both within the UK and abroad. His most important field however, was paediatric neurology, a field in which he excelled. What concerned him most was the topics of chronic disability, cerebral palsy, epilepsy, Language disorder, learning disability, Accident-proneness, emotional and behavioral disorders, all medical disorder's that are within the field of paediatric neurology. Gordon in conducting research and writing publications examined in detail, those who had suffered from learning disabilities and low self-esteem could later lead to clumsiness and failure at school. Out of this research he published a book in 1976 called Neurological problems in childhood and later republished by Butterworth-Heinemann 1993.

== Awards ==
Gordon was the awarded the prestigious James Spence Medal in 1985.
