= Forrester Cockburn =

British paediatrician

Professor Sir Forrester Cockburn
- Born: 13 October 1934; Edinburgh, Scotland
- Died: 8 February 2026; Clydebank, Scotland
- Education: University of Edinburgh
- Awards: CBE 1996, James Spence Medal 1996, The Royal Society of Edinburgh 1999
- Scientific career
- Fields: Pediatrics
- Workplaces: Royal Infirmary of Edinburgh, Simpson Memorial Maternity Pavilion, Boston City Hospital, University of Puerto Rico School of Medicine, University of Oxford, Royal Hospital for Sick Children, Glasgow

Forrester Cockburn CBE FRSE (born 13 October 1934) was a British Paediatrician and emeritus professor at the University of Glasgow. Cockburn is most notable for conducting research into fetal/neonatal nutrition and brain biochemistry, inherited metabolic diseases and Pediatric ethics. Cockburn was awarded the prestigious James Spence Medal in 1998. Professor Cockburn died aged 91 in February 2026.

== Life ==
Cockburn's early education was at Leith Academy. In 1959 Cockburn graduated from the University of Edinburgh, with an MB ChB, later gaining a Doctor of Medicine with honours (cum laude) in 1966 with a thesis titled: Phenylalanine: its role in infant nutrition and disease.

Cockburn married Alison Fisher Née Grieve on 15 January 1960 and had two sons, David Forrester and John Roger.

== Career ==
Cockburn's junior house positions were held the Royal Infirmary of Edinburgh and the Simpson Memorial Maternity Pavilion. In 1961, Cockburn was promoted to paediatric registrar at the Royal Hospital for Sick Children and the Simpson Memorial Maternity Pavilion Edinburgh. In 1963, Cockburn moved to Boston, on a Huntington-Hartford Research Foundation Fellowship in Pediatric Metabolic Disease, taking a position as a medical resident at the Boston City Hospital, and the University of Boston in Massachusetts, achieving the Educational Commission for Foreign Medical Graduates certification. In 1965, Cockburn moved to Puerto Rico, being appointed as an Assistant Professor of Pediatrics at the University of Puerto Rico to study Perinatal asphyxia. This was followed, by a year spent as a Nuffield Senior Research Fellow in Neonatal and Foetal Physiology at the Nuffield Institute for Medical Research, University of Oxford.

From 1966 to 1971, Cockburn returned to work at University of Edinburgh as a senior research fellow. In 1971, he was appointed to the position of Senior lecturer in the Department of Child Health at Edinburgh. From 1977 Cockburn held the Samson Gemmell Chair of Child Health at the University of Glasgow. Cockburn was preceded by James Holmes Hutchison. Cockburn resigned the chair in 1996.

From 1997 to 2001, Cockburn was chairman of the Royal Hospital for Sick Children, Glasgow NHS Trust in Yorkhill, Glasgow.

== Queen Mother's Maternity Hospital closure ==
On 9 December 2003, in an interview with The Scotsman, in relation to the decision by NHS Greater Glasgow and Clyde board to move the Queen Mother's Maternity Hospital, with its maternity unit and the Royal Hospital for Sick Children, Glasgow to the Queen Elizabeth University Hospital campus on the Southside of Glasgow, Professor Cockburn who vehemently opposed the move, stated:

manifest nonsense

to move the hospital and the only reason to close was to save money. Cockburn further stated:

They are going to destroy 40 years of work building up Yorkhill as a unique centre for treating mothers and babies. If the Queen Mother's closes, they will destroy Yorkhill’s service for very young babies. Neonatologists - the doctors who treat them - will scatter. No neonatologist will stay at a hospital where babies are not born. They will not be able to keep up their skill and expertise.

== Bibliography ==
Cockburn wrote more than 200 books and articles. The following are his most popular books and cited papers:

- Neonatal Medicine., Forrester Cockburn; Cecil M Drillien. Oxford, London : Blackwell Scientific Publications., 1974
- Inborn errors of metabolism in humans : monograph based upon proceedings of the international symposium held in Interlaken, September 2–5, 1980., Forrester Cockburn; Richard Gitzelmann. Lancaster : MTP Press., 1982
- Children : a handbook for children's doctors., Forrester Cockburn; Oliver Peter Gray. London : Pitman, 1984.
- Practical paediatric problems., James H Hutchison; Forrester Cockburn. Singapore : PG Publishing Pte, 1986.
- Fetal and neonatal growth., Forrester Cockburn. Chichester : John Wiley & Sons, 1988
- The lipid story : new pieces in the jigsaw : proceedings of a Milupa symposium held in September 1993 at the Queen's Medical Centre, Nottingham, UK., Forrester Cockburn. Macmillan Press, 1994
- Advances in perinatal medicine : proceedings of the XV European Congress of Perinatal Medicine, Glasgow, September 1996., Forrester Cockburn. New York : Parthenon, 1997
- Children's medicine and surgery., Forrester Cockburn; et al. Arnold, 1999.
- Cultured Cell and Inherited Metabolic Disease : Monograph Based Upon., R Angus Harkness; Forrester Cockburn. Dordrecht : Springer Netherlands, 2012.

== Awards and honours ==
- CBE 1996 for services to children and medicine.
- James Spence Medal 1996
- The Royal Society of Edinburgh 1999
