= James Spence Medal =

Medicinal medal

James Spence Medal is a medal that was first struck in 1960, six years after the death of the paediatrician James Calvert Spence and is awarded for outstanding contributions to the advancement or clarification of paediatric knowledge and is the highest honour bestowed by The Royal College of Paediatrics and Child Health.

== Recipients ==
Year	Name	Rationale	Notes
1960	Alan Moncrieff	"for developing the first premature-baby unit in 1947"	
1961	Robert McCance	"for publishing The Chemical Composition of Foods in 1940 which later became the most authoritative publication of its kind, and later research into rationing in wartime Britain and the adequacy of the diets, which included for the first time the addition of chalk into bread for calcium intake."	
No award			
1963	Frank Macfarlane Burnet	"for research into the field of Immunology and Virology"	
1964	Lionel Sharples Penrose	"for major contributions in human genetics and extensive research into Down syndrome and Intellectual disability."	
1965	Cicely Williams	"for her discovery of Kwashiorkor, a nutritional disease, in Accra and for recognising malnutrition was more likely to be caused by lack of nutritional knowledge rather than poverty"	
1967	Robert Royston Amos Coombs	"for developing the Coombs test. This was first described in 1945, the test identifies incomplete antibodies in auto-immune haemolytic anaemia and is part of the standard cross-matching procedure to prevent transfusion reactions due to incompatible blood"	
1968	Mary Sheridan	"for research into children's speech and language delays as well as hearing impairment, and developed the STYCAR tests"	
1968	Donald W. Winnicott	"for developing the ideas of primary maternal preoccupation, the transitional object and the therapeutic interview"	
1969	Geoffrey S. Dawes	"for research into the distribution and control of foetal circulation predominately in unborn lambs and for later research that led him to being the foremost international authority on neo-natal physiology"	
1970	Douglas Vernon Hubble	"for research into paediatric endocrinology and publishing a number of excellent papers on the subject, which gave him a national reputation"	
1971	Wilfrid Payne	"for developing flame photometry and chromatography, enzymology, fat balances and chylomicron counting, and for conducting research on gastroenteritis, calcium and phosphorus metabolism, and on coeliac and fibrocystic diseases"	
1972	Ronald Charles MacKeith	"for establishing the first cerebral palsy advice clinic, which was to become in 1964 the larger and more comprehensive Newcomen Centre for handicapped children, and for gaining recognition of paediatric neurology, and for founding the British Paediatric Neurology Association and founding the Journal of Developmental Medicine & Child Neurology"	
1973	Cyril Astley Clarke	"for his pioneering research on prevention of Rh disease of the newborn"	
1974	Edward John Bowlby	"for research into attachment and formulation of Attachment theory	
No award			
1976	Douglas Gairdner	"for a number of research studies in neonatology at a time when that subject was being developed as perhaps the most rewarding application of basic physiology to patient care, and later his most important contributions an editor; first of Recent Advances in Paediatrics and then of Archives of Disease in Childhood, turning the latter into an international journal of repute with its exemplary standards of content and presentation"	
1977	Ronald Stanley Illingworth	"largely responsible for introducing paediatricians to the UK in the early to mid 1940s."	
1978	Seymour Donald Mayneord Court	"for not only for his achievements in the fields of respiratory disease and the epidemiology of disease in childhood, but for being a compassionate leader who influenced others to debate major issues facing the British Paediatric Association (abbr. BPA) and the services they provide."	
1979	Kenneth Cross	"due to his fundamental contributions to the physiology of newborns that were so relevant to paediatric practice"	
1980	James Mourilyan Tanner	"for the development of the Tanner scale and conducting research in growth in children, which grew into the Harpenden Longitudinal Growth Study	
1981	Elsie Widdowson	"for conducting critical research into nutrition, including the composition of foods, under-nutrition in man, and the nutritional requirements of the fetus and newly born, and for overseeing the government-mandated addition of vitamins to food and wartime rationing during World War II in Britain."	
1982	Dermod MacCarthy	"for establishing paediatric unit at Stoke Mandeville Hospital and conducting research into common disturbances in childhood and growth in deprived children."	
1983	John Oldroyd Forfar	"for establishing modern neonatal care in Edinburgh, for prolific contributions to paediatric literature and for teaching a large number of paediatricians"	
1984	James W. Bruce Douglas	"for founding the National Survey of Health and Development	
1985	Neil Simson Gordon	"for research into paediatric neurology, eponymic diseases including chronic handicaps, cerebral palsy, epilepsy, disorders of languages and learning difficulties. He was one of the first to initiate comprehensive multidisciplinary assessment centres for children"	
1986	John Peter Mills Tizard	"for important research into neonatology and paediatric neurology"	
1987	John Lewis Emery	"for being one of the founding fathers of paediatric pathology in the country, and for conducting research into haematology, developmental anatomy, congenital deformities, particularly hydrocephalus, and unexplained infant deaths"	
1987	Frederick John William Miller	"for developing a home nursing service for premature infants"	
1988	Otto Herbert Wolff	"for being one of the first paediatricians in Britain to set up a clinic for obese children and conducting research into plasma lipids and, with Harold Salt, pioneered the techniques of lipoprotein electrophoresis. He later conducted research into the role of lipid disturbance in childhood as a precursor of coronary artery disease and his recognition in 1960 of the rare condition of abetalipoproteinaemia."	
1989	David Cornelius Morley	"for transforming the approach to the health care of children in the developing world. He showed that infant mortality could be cut by over 80%—not by the introduction of modern medicine and the building of hospitals, but by education and the use of locally available resources"	
1990	Leonard B. Strang	"for contributing to the first accounts of harlequinism and of catecholamine secretion in neuroblastoma and later leading a team over two decades studying pulmonary vasculature in the perinatal period and even more, the central role that secretion of lungs containing fluid plays in lung formation and preparation for birth."	
1991	John Allen Davis	"for major research contributions to newborn physiology, particularly to the understanding of apnoea in the neonatal period"	
1992	Richard Worthington Smithells	"for research into neural tube defects, congenital abnormality registers, genetic counselling, and rubella in pregnancy and for later suggesting direct examination of the fetus by photography using ultrasonography"	
1993	June Lloyd	"for research into studies on nutrition, especially the role of lipid metabolism in health and disease in childhood, which was original and difficult to investigate at that time and for the discovery that the rare metabolic disease, oQ-betalipoproteinaemia, could be avoided with the use of vitamin E."	
1994	Osmund Royle Reynolds	"for the introduction of new techniques intended to improve the survival of newborns, especially those with respiratory failure, and for a series of papers regarding the value of techniques such as ultrasound imaging, nuclear magnetic resonance spectroscopy, and near infrared spectroscopy in determining the development and response to injury of the infant brain after birth"	
1995	Richard H. R. White	"for pioneering a percutaneous renal biopsy technique which could be used with local anaesthetic and for later research contributions in the pathology of glomerular disease and he was appointed as one of the four renal pathology assessors for the International Study of Kidney Disease in Children	
1996	David Hull	"for a paper he published in the Journal of Physiology in 1963 with Michael Dawkins, was about research into brown fat, an adipose-like tissue found in hibernating animals and in the human neonate and for later contributions considered outstanding"	
1997	Barbara Ansell	"for outstanding contributions to the advancement of paediatric knowledge, specifically defining chronic joint disorders and improving their management"	
1998	Forrester Cockburn	"for conducting research in fetal/neonatal nutrition and brain biochemistry, inherited metabolic diseases and ethics in paediatric research"	
1999	David Harvey	"helped pioneer the training of doctors in neonatal medicine at a time when the speciality had no official recognition and notable for making the case for research in areas then considered irrelevant"	
1999	Roy Meadow	"for established a supra-regional paediatric nephrology service and for discovering Factitious disorder imposed on another previously called Munchausen syndrome by proxy"	
2000	Hugh Jackson	"for research into prevention of child injury, which subsequently lead to childproof containers being introduced, as well as working to prevent children from choking on pen lids"	
2001	Peter M. Dunn	"For introducing in 1971, into the UK, the Gregory box, CPAP, that provides continuous positive airway pressure in treatment of RDS of the newborn and conducting research interests include congenital dislocation of the hip (Hip dysplasia) and fetal adaptation to extrauterine life"	
2002	Martin Barratt	"first to establish a specialist service for children with kidney diseases in Britain, developing a model of interdisciplinary care that was later adopted by many other centres throughout the world. His research led to improved understanding and treatment of many common childhood kidney diseases"	
2003	Catherine Peckham	"for research into infectious disease epidemiology, particularly in pregnancy and early childhood, immunisation and child health surveillance."	
2004	David Hall	"for publishing with Dr Gillian Baird, a paper on the role of primary care in identifying developmental problems that later led to the report Health for all children that lead to one of the first attempts to apply an objective evidence based approach to medical practice for children"	
2004	Lewis Spitz	"for championing the plight of those with cerebral palsy and other congenital disorders whose foregut and its function prejudiced their ability to eat; demonstrating that appropriate surgery could improve their quality of life and for management of and treatment of conjoined twins thereby becoming the foremost international opinion in this field"	
2005	Cyril Chantler	"where he and Norman Veale devised a method of measurement of glomerular function in children and later researched diet and growth failure in children with renal impairment"	
2006	Alan Lucas	"for founding the Child Nutrition Research Centre and initiating the first intervention trials to test the programming effects of early nutrition on long term health and development"	
2006	Jonathan Richard Sibert	"for an enormous contribution to paediatric research and being international expert in child protection"	
2007	Victor Dubowitz	"Along with his wife Lilly Dubowitz for developing two clinical tests, the Dubowitz Score to estimate gestational age and the other for the systematic neurological examination of the newborn"	
2008	Alan Craft	"as part of the Children's Cancer Study Group, lead to research into paediatric oncology, especially bone tumour clinical research and epidemiology, which further lead to an oncology research unit which has been involved in aetiological studies and in particular the role of irradiation in the development of childhood cancer"	
2009	Neil McIntosh	"for being the leading writer of a pivotal document guiding standards of ethical behaviour in paediatrics, including withdrawal of newborn intensive care."	
2010	Malcolm Levene	"An international force in Fetal and Neonatal Neurology, his research focussing on perinatal brain injury"	
2011	Andrew Wilkinson	"an international authority in neonatology and lead author of Standards of Care for NICU and NICE guidelines on retinopathy of prematurity"	
2011	Anthony Costello	"best known for his work on improving survival among mothers and their newborn infants in poor populations of developing countries"	
2012	Sheila Shribman	"for the successful integration of children's services in hospital, community and mental health settings, working closely with the local authority."	
2013	Albert Aynsley-Green	"for research into paediatric endocrinology and for advancing the idea of the rights of children"	
2014	Ieuan Hughes	"for long-standing research into disorders of sex development (DSD), established one of the largest and most comprehensive databases of cases of DSD including publishing the Consensus on DSD management framework which, barely eight years after its publication, is now already accepted worldwide as the framework for care of patients and families with DSD"	
2015	David Dunger	"for research into three areas, Pathogenesis of type 1 diabetes and its complications, Perinatal origins of risk for obesity and type 2 diabetes, and Experimental Medicine"	
2016	Terence Stephenson	"for guiding the RCPCH in agreeing 10 published national standards, ‘Facing the Future: Standards for Paediatric Services’. This was the first time the College committed publicly to a defined set of standards for all children receiving inpatient care or assessment across the UK"	
2017	Anne Greenough	"for research into clinical and academic neonatology through work relating to the origins, markers and management of chronic lung disease following preterm birth"	
2018	Frances Cowan	"for her contribution to clinical and academic perinatal neurology"	
2019	Alan Emond	"for research into child and adolescent injury, epidemiology and health service evaluation as well as the Avon Longitudinal Study of Parents and Children"	
2020	Catherine Law	"for research into paediatric epidemiology and child public health, for research into the development of cardiovascular risk factors in children, physical growth, and inequalities in child health, for the use of research for public policy"	
2021	Henry Halliday	"for research into neonatology, for coordinating two of the largest neonatal multicentre trials for prevention and treatment of a number of neonatal respiratory illnesses, for publishing the Handbook of Neonatal Intensive Care, a widely accepted text that is used all over the world and for a breathrough in the development of a new lung surfactant"	
2022	Imtiaz Choonara	"for establishing paediatric clinical pharmacology as an accredited subspecialty of paediatrics in the uk and the world, for research into and assessing clinical trials for children, for establishing the journal BMJ Paediatrics Open and for writing a number of widely accepted, standard textbooks and chapters on paediatric pharmacology"	
2022	Andrew Pollard	"for research into vaccines for many life-threatening infectious diseases including typhoid fever, Neisseria meningitidis, Haemophilus influenzae type b, streptococcus pneumoniae, pertussis, influenza, rabies, and Ebola	
2023	David Edwards	"the driving force behind the research and implementation of therapeutic hypothermia for neonates ..... (He) has also pioneered the use of MRI scanning to image the smallest and sickest babies.	
2024	Andrew Bush	"for research into paediatric respiratory medicine, especially clinical respiratory physiology and invasive and non-invasive assessment of airway inflammation in asthma and cystic fibrosis"	
2025	Deirdre Kelly	"for research into biliary atresia and leading advancements in liver transplantation, including optimal immunosuppression and pioneering cut-down liver and combined liver-small bowel transplantation"	
2025	Martin Savage	"for research into phenotype-genotype relationships of GH-IGF-1 axis defects, specifically GH resistance as well as research into cushing's syndrome and growth in chronic inflammatory diseases"	
2026	Russell Viner		

== See also ==
- List of medicine awards
