= Dunger =

Dunger is a German-language surname. Notable people with the surname include:

- David Dunger (died 2021), British paediatric endocrinologist
- Frank Dünger (1961–2006), German footballer
- Hella Dunger-Löper (born 1951), German politician
- Hermann Dunger (1843–1912), German educator
- Nicolai Dunger, Swedish singer and acoustic songwriter
- Steffen Dünger (born 1967), German footballer
- Wolfram Dunger (1929–2019), German soil zoologist
