= Ieuan Hughes =

British pediatric endocrinologist

Professor Ieuan Hughes FMedSci FRCP FRCPCH FLSW FRCPC

Professor of Paediatrics, University of Cambridge
- In office 1989–2011

Personal details
- Born: Ieuan Arwel Hughes; 9 November 1944 (age 81)

Ieuan Arwel Hughes (born 9 November 1944) is a British paediatric endocrinologist who is an emeritus professor of paediatrics at the University of Cambridge. Hughes is most notable for long-standing research into disorders of sex development (DSD), established one of the largest and most comprehensive databases of cases of DSD including publishing the Consensus on DSD management framework which, barely eight years after its publication, is now already accepted worldwide as the framework for care of patients and families with DSD.

== Career ==
Hughes was a professor of paediatrics at the University of Cambridge, and the head of the School of Clinical Medicine's Department of Paediatrics for 23 years before retiring as an emeritus professor. Throughout his career in paediatric endocrinology, he specialised in disorders of sex development (DSD); he created a comprehensive database of DSD cases and established international consensus-based guidelines for the management of these cases. He also founded and chaired the Clinical Committee of the British Society for Paediatric Endocrinology and Diabetes and published over 230 original journal articles.

== Societies ==
- Hughes was elected a Fellow of the Academy of Medical Sciences in 1998.
- Hughes was elected a Fellow of the Learned Society of Wales in 2011.

== Awards and honours ==
- In 2014 he was awarded the James Spence Medal, the highest honour given by the Royal College of Paediatrics and Child Health.

== Selected bibliography ==
- Hughes, I. (March 2015). "Consequences of the Chicago DSD Consensus: A Personal Perspective". Hormone and Metabolic Research. 47 (5): 394–400. doi:10.1055/s-0035-1545274. ISSN 0018-5043. PMID 25750076.
- Hughes, Ieuan (October 2010). "How should we classify intersex disorders?". Journal of Pediatric Urology. 6 (5): 447–448. doi:10.1016/j.jpurol.2010.04.005. ISSN 1477-5131. PMID 20605745.
- Pasterski, V.; Prentice, P.; Hughes, I. A. (August 2010). "Consequences of the Chicago consensus on disorders of sex development (DSD): current practices in Europe". Archives of Disease in Childhood. 95 (8): 618–623. doi:10.1136/adc.2009.163840. ISSN 0003-9888. PMID 19773218. S2CID 11566917.
- Pasterski, V.; Prentice, P.; Hughes, I.A. (April 2010). "Impact of the consensus statement and the new DSD classification system". Best Practice & Research Clinical Endocrinology & Metabolism. 24 (2): 187–195. doi:10.1016/j.beem.2009.11.004. ISSN 1521-690X. PMID 20541147.
- Hughes, Ieuan A. (February 2008). "Disorders of sex development: a new definition and classification". Best Practice & Research Clinical Endocrinology & Metabolism. 22 (1): 119–134. doi:10.1016/j.beem.2007.11.001. ISSN 1521-690X. PMID 18279784.
- Hughes, I A; Houk, C; Ahmed, S F; Lee, P A; LWPES/ESPE Consensus Group (April 2006). "Consensus statement on management of intersex disorders". Archives of Disease in Childhood. 91 (7): 554–563. doi:10.1136/adc.2006.098319. ISSN 0003-9888. PMC 2082839. PMID 16624884.
