= Alan Emond =

British paediatrician and researcher

Alan Martin Emond FRCP FRCPCH FHEA
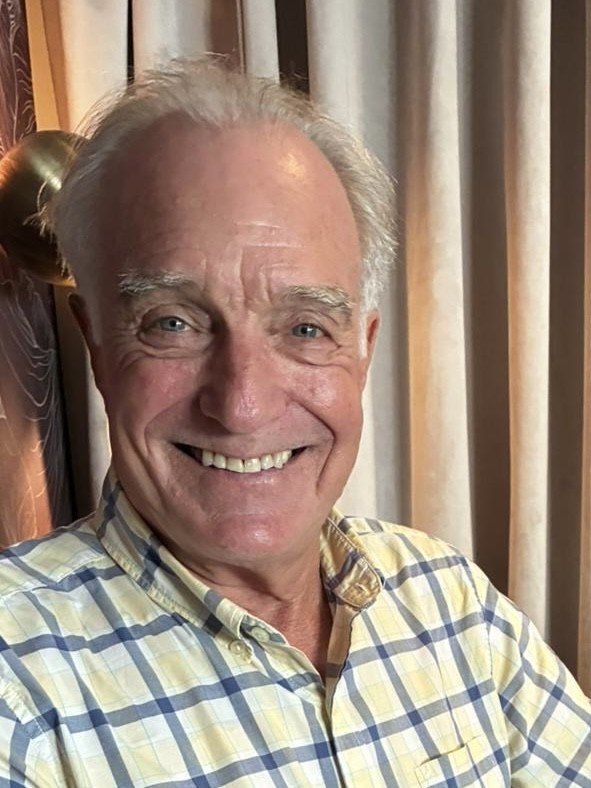
- Emond in 2026

Emeritus Professor of Child Health, University of Bristol

Personal details
- Born: 19 March 1953 (age 73) London
- Occupation: clinical academic paediatrician
- Known for: Clinical research and teaching in community paediatrics, child development, childhood injury, paediatric epidemiology and child public health.

Alan Martin Emond (born 1953) is a British paediatrician and clinical academic whose work has focused on community paediatrics, child public health, paediatric epidemiology, child development and health-service evaluation. He is Emeritus Professor of Child Health at the University of Bristol. He was director of the Centre for Child and Adolescent Health at Bristol from 2003 to 2018 and director of the Scar Free Foundation Children's Burns Research Centre from 2012 to 2017. His research has included studies using the Avon Longitudinal Study of Parents and Children (ALSPAC), as well as clinical trials and research into childhood injuries, developmental disorders and community-based child health services. In 2019, he was awarded the James Spence Medal by the Royal College of Paediatrics and Child Health.

== Life ==
Emond was born in London. He studied at Queen Elizabeth Grammar School in Barnet and Gonville and Caius College, University of Cambridge, where he completed undergraduate studies in medical sciences and religious studies in 1974. His clinical studies were completed at King's College Hospital School, University of London, graduating in medicine and surgery in 1977. He received the degrees of MA in medical sciences from Cambridge in 1978 and MD in 1987 for research on the role of the spleen in childhood sickle-cell disease.

Emond trained initially in internal medicine before specializing in paediatrics. His clinical training included posts at King's College Hospital and St Thomas' Hospital in London, Great Ormond Street Hospital, and the Royal Alexandra Hospital for Children in Sydney, Australia. He obtained membership of the Royal College of Physicians in 1980 and subsequently became a fellow of the Royal College of Physicians, and was a founding fellow of the Royal College of Paediatrics and Child Health. He was elected a Fellow of the Higher Education Academy in 2005.

== Career ==
Following resident clinical training in London, he undertook doctoral studies from 1982 to 1984 as an MRC Research Fellow at the University of the West Indies in Kingston, Jamaica. Emond joined the University of Bristol in 1986, initially as a lecturer in child health and later as a consultant senior lecturer. In 1989 he became a consultant paediatrician in Bristol and was subsequently involved in the development of community paediatric services in the city, initially based from the Bristol Children’s Hospital and then from 2002 to 2013, Emond worked as a consultant community paediatrician with North Bristol NHS Trust. He was clinical lead for community paediatrics within the Community Children's Health Partnership in Bristol.

In 2002 he was appointed as Professor of Community Child Health at the University of Bristol. From 2003 to 2018 he was director of the Centre for Child and Adolescent Health, a multidisciplinary research and teaching centre involving the University of Bristol, the University of the West of England and Bristol NHS partners. He subsequently became Emeritus Professor of Child Health in 2019.

From 2012 to 2017, Emond was director of the Scar Free Foundation Children's Burns Research Centre in Bristol and Cardiff. His work in this area included research into the epidemiology and prevention of childhood burns and scalds.

He chaired the British Association of Community Child Health from 2005 to 2009 and the British Paediatric Surveillance Unit from 2009 to 2013. He has also served on committees and advisory groups associated with the Medical Research Council, the National Institute for Health Research and the UK Department of Health, including the Joint Committee on Vaccination and Immunisation. His work has included advising on child-health surveillance, prevention and health-service policy.

== Research and scholarly work ==
Emond's research has primarily addressed community child health, paediatric epidemiology, child development, injury prevention and evaluation of health services. His work has combined population-based studies with clinical research and trials, and has examined how evidence can be applied to the delivery of healthcare for children.

A major component of his research has involved the Avon Longitudinal Study of Parents and Children (ALSPAC), also known as the Children of the 90s. His research using the cohort has examined associations between pregnancy and early-life exposures and later child development and behaviour, as well as early growth, developmental characteristics, enuresis, childhood injuries, adolescent risk-taking and resilience. The University of Bristol identifies ALSPAC as an important component of his research and lists more than 150 research outputs associated with his academic work.

His research on childhood injury has included burns and scalds. In a prospective population-based study using ALSPAC data, Emond and colleagues examined developmental and behavioural characteristics preceding burns and scald injuries among children. His subsequent work with the Children's Burns Research Centre contributed to research into the prevention childhood burns, including the national SafeTea campaign in 2019.

Another strand of his research has concerned developmental and behavioural disorders. His publications have examined developmental traits, co-ordination difficulties, speech and language disorders, autistic traits and associated social and emotional outcomes. More recent work has included prospective population studies examining social, emotional and behavioural difficulties associated with persistent speech disorder in children.

Emond has also participated in research concerning adolescent behavior and public health. His work has included longitudinal research using ALSPAC into gambling among young people and young adults.

=== Health for All Children ===
Emond was the senior editor of the fifth edition of Health for All Children, published by Oxford University Press in 2019. The volume provides an evidence-based review of preventive healthcare, health promotion and community-based child-health programmes from pregnancy through the first seven years of life. It incorporates evidence from international research while considering its application to health policy and practice in the United Kingdom. The fifth edition was launched in 2019 with support from the Royal College of Paediatrics and Child Health. The college described the volume as an updated review of the evidence underpinning child-health programmes in the UK and noted Emond's role as senior editor.

== Awards and honours ==
- In 2019 he was awarded the James Spence Medal, the highest honour given by the Royal College of Paediatrics and Child Health, for his extensive and wide-ranging research work.

His other professional recognition and appointments have included:

- Fellow of the Royal College of Physicians (FRCP), 1994.
- Fellow of the Royal College of Paediatrics and Child Health (FRCPCH), 1997.
- Founding Fellow of the Royal College of Paediatrics and Child Health, 1997.
- Fellow of the Higher Education Academy (FHEA), 2005.

== Bibliography ==
- Emond, A. M.; Morais, P.; Venugopal, S.; Carpenter, R. G.; Serjeant, G. R. (14 January 1984). "Role of splenectomy in homozygous sickle cell disease in childhood". Lancet. 1 (8368): 88–91. doi:10.1016/s0140-6736(84)90014-x. ISSN 0140-6736. PMID 6140433.\
- Emond, A.M.; Collis, R.; Darvill, D.; Higgs, D.R.; Maude, G.H.; Serjeant, G.R. (August 1985). "Acute splenic sequestration in homozygous sickle cell disease: Natural history and management". The Journal of Pediatrics. 107 (2): 201–206. doi:10.1016/S0022-3476(85)80125-6. PMID 4020541.
- Emond, A; Drewett, R; Blair, P; Emmett, P (10 March 2006). "Postnatal factors associated with failure to thrive in term infants in the Avon Longitudinal Study of Parents and Children". Archives of Disease in Childhood. 92 (2): 115–119. doi:10.1136/adc.2005.091496. PMC 2083322. PMID 16905563.
- Emond, Alan M.; Blair, Peter S.; Emmett, Pauline M.; Drewett, Robert F. (1 October 2007). "Weight Faltering in Infancy and IQ Levels at 8 Years in the Avon Longitudinal Study of Parents and Children". Pediatrics. 120 (4): e1051–e1058. doi:10.1542/peds.2006-2295. PMID 17908725.
- Lingam, Raghu; Hunt, Linda; Golding, Jean; Jongmans, Marian; Emond, Alan (1 April 2009). "Prevalence of Developmental Coordination Disorder Using the DSM-IV at 7 Years of Age: A UK Population–Based Study". Pediatrics. 123 (4): e693–e700. doi:10.1542/peds.2008-1770. PMID 19336359.
- Emond, Alan; Emmett, Pauline; Steer, Colin; Golding, Jean (1 August 2010). "Feeding Symptoms, Dietary Patterns, and Growth in Young Children With Autism Spectrum Disorders". Pediatrics. 126 (2): e337–e342. doi:10.1542/peds.2009-2391. PMID 20643716.
- Emond, Alan; Ingram, Jenny; Johnson, Debbie; Blair, Peter; Whitelaw, Andrew; Copeland, Marion; Sutcliffe, Alastair (May 2014). "Randomised controlled trial of early frenotomy in breastfed infants with mild–moderate tongue-tie". Archives of Disease in Childhood - Fetal and Neonatal Edition. 99 (3): F189–F195. doi:10.1136/archdischild-2013-305031. PMC 3995264. PMID 24249695.
- Emond, Alan; Sheahan, Clare; Mytton, Julie; Hollén, Linda (May 2017). "Developmental and behavioural associations of burns and scalds in children: a prospective population-based study". Archives of Disease in Childhood. 102 (5): 428–483. doi:10.1136/archdischild-2016-311644. PMC 6234232. PMID 28424177.
- Emond, Alan; Griffiths, Mark D.; Hollén, Linda (April 2022). "Problem Gambling in Early Adulthood: a Population-Based Study". International Journal of Mental Health and Addiction. 20 (2): 754–770. doi:10.1007/s11469-020-00401-1. PMC 8930883. PMID 35368861.
- Cowley, Laura Elizabeth; Bennett, C Verity; Brown, Isabelle; Emond, Alan; Kemp, Alison Mary (October 2021). "Mixed-methods process evaluation of SafeTea: a multimedia campaign to prevent hot drink scalds in young children and promote burn first aid". Injury Prevention. 27 (5): 419–427. doi:10.1136/injuryprev-2020-043909. PMC 8461408. PMID 33093127.
- Wren, Yvonne; Pagnamenta, Emma; Orchard, Faith; Peters, Tim J.; Emond, Alan; Northstone, Kate; Miller, Laura Louise; Roulstone, Susan (March 2023). "Social, emotional and behavioural difficulties associated with persistent speech disorder in children: A prospective population study". JCPP Advances. 3 (1) e12126. doi:10.1002/jcv2.12126. PMC 10241475. PMID 37431315.
