= Sheila Shribman =

English paediatrician

- Occupation: consultant paediatrician
- Years active: 1980s–present
- Medical career
- Awards: James Spence Medal (2012)

Sheila Shribman CBE is a British paediatrician. Shribman was most notable for the successful integration of children's services in hospital, community and mental health settings, working closely with the local authority. She was named a Commander of the Order of the British Empire during the 2011 New Year Honours and awarded the James Spence Medal in 2012.

== Early life and education ==
Shribman completed a degree at Cambridge University and went to London for training at multiple hospitals including Great Ormond Street Hospital.

== Career ==
Shribman began her career as a consultant paediatrician in the 1980s. Early in her career, Shribman was a member of a committee on children protection for eighteen years and worked at the Northampton General Hospital in the 1990s. While at Northampton, she was the hospital's medical director for eleven years.

In 2005, Shribman was named the Department of Health's National Clinical Director for Children. Prior to her appointment, Shribman worked for the Royal College of Paediatrics and Child Health as a registrar for three years. After her position with the Department of Health ended in 2013, she was selected by Guy's and St Thomas' NHS Foundation Trust as a non-executive director and reelected in 2017. In 2017, Shribman was a board member of the Evelina London Children's Hospital.

Outside of healthcare, Shribman was named chair of the Dartmouth Food Festival in 2017.

== Awards and honours ==
In 2011, Shribman was appointed a Commander of the Order of the British Empire at the 2011 New Year Honours. In 2012, she was awarded the James Spence Medal.

== Personal life ==
Shribman has three children.
