= Russell Viner =

Australian-British paediatrician (born 1963)

Russell Mardon Viner, CBE FMedSci (born 1963) is an Australian-British paediatrician and policy researcher who is Chief Scientific Advisor at the Department for Education and Professor of Adolescent Health at the UCL Great Ormond Street Institute of Child Health. He is an expert on child and adolescent health in the UK

His research focuses on the health of children and young people, from global analyses of social determinants of health and global burden of disease (GBD), through use of ‘big’ routine data in children and young people's healthcare, to conducting intervention studies both at the school level and clinical interventions in obesity and diabetes.

== Professional life ==
He was a member of the UK Government's Scientific Advisory Group for Emergencies (SAGE) during the COVID-19 pandemic (advising on children, young people and schools) and was President of the Royal College of Paediatrics and Child Health from 2018 to 2021. He remains clinically active, seeing young people with diabetes each week at UCL Hospitals. Viner is vice-chair of the NHS England Transformation Board for Children and Young People and Chair of the Stakeholder Council for the Board. He is a non-executive director (NED) at Great Ormond St. Hospital for Children NHS Foundation Trust.

Viner was appointed as Chief Scientific Advisor (CSA) to the Department for Education in January 2023, with responsibility for science and evidence use within the department and science advice to Ministers.n.

== Academic societies ==
He is a Fellow of the Academy of Medical Sciences (FMedSci) and a Fellow of the Royal Australasian College of Physicians (FRACP, 1995), of the Royal College of Paediatrics and Child Health (FRCPCH, 1998) and was awarded a fellowship of the Royal College of Physicians (London) in 2000.

== Awards and honours ==
- Commander of the Most Excellent Order of the British Empire (CBE), awarded in the 2022 New Year's Honours List.
- James Spence Medal, awarded on 2026
