= Leonard B. Strang =

British pediatrician

- Born: Leonard Birnie Strang; 13 May 1925; East Kilbride, Scotland
- Died: 24 June 1997 (aged 72); Marseille, France
- Education: Durham University
- Known for: Research into lung formation
- Awards: James Spence Medal
- Scientific career
- Workplaces: Royal Victoria Infirmary; Hammersmith Hospital; Harvard Medical School; University College London

Leonard Birnie Strang FRCP (13 May 1925 – 24 June 1997) was a Scottish-born British professor of pediatric sciences and was a Secretary of the Paediatric Committee of the Royal College of Physicians. He was considered an outstanding clinical observer, contributing to the first accounts of harlequinism and of catecholamine secretion in neuroblastoma. However, it was his later work that Leonard Strang became famous, leading a team over two decades studying pulmonary vasculature in the perinatal period and even more the central role that secretion of lungs containing fluid plays in lung formation and preparation for birth.

== Personal life ==
Strang was born in Scotland to father who was from farming family in East Kilbride and a mother from the Don Valley of Aberdeen. The family relocated to England when he aged five. He was the youngest of three siblings, all of whom pursued careers in medicine. Strang's formative influence in early life was the paediatrician James Calvert Spence. Strang had been Spence's patient, when at the age of 10, he suffered from septicaemia following a bought Mastoiditis, which destroyed both his hips, and left his legs weakened causing him to walk with shoulder crutches and then walking sticks for the rest of his life. This was in the time before antibiotics meaning surgery was required in an attempt to repair and correct the damage. Following the large number of surgeries left Strang with a deep understanding of doctor patient divide and following months of convalescence enabled him to read widely.

He married his first wife, Madeleine Allen (1925-1981), in 1954. They had four children: Emily, Juliet, William, and Vanessa. Following the death of his first wife, Strang remarried, to his second wife, Susan Plant, in 1983, whom he lived with in Volx, France during his retirement. He died in 1997, as a result of a medical procedure which went wrong.

== Life ==
Strang was educated at the Royal Grammar School, Newcastle. Strang gained his MB BS from Durham University in 1949. Strang undertook his postgraduate training in paediatrics at the Royal Victoria Infirmary in Newcastle, in the department founded by James Calvert Spence, a supreme clinician. It was during the seven years period while he was at the infirmary working under Spence, that Strang's talent as a clinical researcher emerged and the first initial research efforts into harlequinism and of catecholamine secretion in neuroblastoma emerged.

Strang started his career in 1953 as a registrar and first assistant at the Department of Child Health, Durham University. He then moved on to work as a Medical Research Council Clinical Research Fellow at the Royal Postgraduate Medical School at Hammersmith Hospital, between the years 1961-1962. Strang spent a year in US to take up the role of Research Fellow at Harvard Medical School. While at Harvard, he undertook research identifying the lung circulation in the newborn infants with respiratory distress. He was, importantly for his future work, also introduced to the study of animal foetal physiology. Strang spent his professional life from 1963 to 1990 at University College Hospital Medical School (University College London), first as a Reader in Paediatrics between 1963–67, and then as first Professor of Paediatrics at a London undergraduate medical school from 1967 to 1990.

Strang published his book Neonatal respiration: physiological and clinical studies, Oxford, Blackwell Scientific Publications, 1977, which focused on pulmonary vasculature in the perinatal period.

== Accolades ==
Strang was the awarded the James Spence Medal in 1990. He was elected to the Royal Colleges of Physicians of the United Kingdom, in 1952, and became a Fellow of the Royal College of Physicians in 1967.

== Bibliography ==
- Neonatal respiration: physiological and clinical studies (1977)
