= Richard Ellis (paediatrician) =

British paediatrician (1902–1966)

Richard White Bernard Ellis FRSE OBE MID (25 August 1902 – 15 September 1966) was a British paediatrician. He was made President of the British Paediatric Association in 1965.

== Early life ==
He was born on 25 August 1902 the son of Bernard Ellis, a prominent Quaker in Leicester.

He went to The Downs School and Leighton Park School. In 1920 he joined his elder brother at King's College, Cambridge. He graduated with an MA in natural sciences in 1923 then went to St Thomas Hospital in London for professional training as a doctor, receiving an MB from the University of London in 1926.

== Career ==
He worked at Great Ormond Street Hospital and under Kenneth Blackfan at the Boston Children's Hospital.

In 1936, he was appointed Physician for children's diseases at Guy's Hospital in London. During this period he campaigned to obtain part of the £200,000 endowment left by Caleb Diplock to "the children of Sussex" and succeeded in gaining 10% of this sum for Guy's. The two children's wards were updated using this money and thereafter were known as Caleb Ward and Diplock Ward.

In 1937 he travelled to Spain to aid Basque refugees in the Spanish Civil War. He was a member of the National Joint Committee for Spanish Relief from 1937 to 1939.

In the Second World War he initially involved himself in the plight of Polish refugees in Romania and Hungary. From 1940 he served in the Royal Air Force Medical Service, with the rank of Wing Commander (but is not thought to have had any pilot training). He served in North Africa, Italy and Belgium. For his role as Medical Adviser to the Mediterranean Allied Air Force he was awarded the Order of the British Empire (OBE) in 1945. He continued to travel after the war, giving educational programmes on child-health in Africa, India and Indonesia.

In 1946, he became Professor of Childlife and Health at the University of Edinburgh retiring there in 1964.

In 1951, he was elected a member of the Harveian Society of Edinburgh and, in 1952, he was elected a Fellow of the Royal Society of Edinburgh.

In 1960, he became Chairman of the Remand Homes Committee.

From 1958, was diagnosed with cancer and had a carcinoma removed. He died at the Glebe House, Hawridge, Berkhamsted on 15 September 1966.

== Family ==
In 1941, he married Dr Audrey Russell, who also worked in the relief effort during the Spanish Civil War. They adopted two children in the 1940s.

== Publications ==
- Child Health and Development (1949)
- Diseases of Infancy and Childhood (1951)
- Health in Childhood (1961)
