= Geoffrey S. Dawes =

British physiologist (1918–1996)

Professor Geoffrey S. Dawes CBE FRS FRCOG FRCP
- Born: 21 January 1918; Mackworth, Amber Valley, England
- Died: 6 May 1996 (aged 78); Oxford, England
- Education: Oxford University
- Known for: The foremost international authority on fetal and neonatal physiology.
- Scientific career
- Fields: physiology
- Institutions: Oxford University; Charing Cross Hospital; John Radcliffe Hospital

Geoffrey Sharman Dawes (21 January 1918 – 6 May 1996) was an English physiologist and was considered to be the foremost international authority on fetal and neonatal physiology.

== Biography ==
Dawes was born on 21 January 1918, in Mackworth, Derbyshire, and was brought up in Elvaston, where his father was the vicar of Elvaston and Thulston. He had four siblings who were all older than he was. Dawes lived at Thurleston Hall, the vicarage for Elvaston. The hall had previously been the home of William Darwin Fox. His prep school was in the next village of Shardlow, where he studied until he started at Repton School which was still within south Derbyshire. This association with Repton continued as later he would become both a member and later chair of their governors.

As World War II was beginning, he gained a place at Oxford University, eventually achieving a 1st in physiology in 1943. Suffering from asthma, he was considered exempt from conscription, and by 1943 had completed his clinical training. Unable to go into the military, he joined J H Burn in the department of pharmacology, treating the sort of diseases and complaints that soldiers of the front suffered from during World War I, like gas gangrene and nerve gas exposure. When the war ended, he was awarded a Rockefeller travelling fellowship, travelling to America to work at Harvard University and in Philadelphia. He returned to work in Oxford on a Foulerton Royal Society research fellowship.

== Career ==
Dawes became the director of the Nuffield Institute for Medical Research in Oxford in 1948 only five years after obtaining his degree in medicine, and where he worked for the next 37 years, and setting the Institutes research focus on developmental physiology.

Following his appointment as director Dawes had to decide on an area of research that was worthy of his attention. He decided on fetal physiology as he thought at the time that study of fetuses would allow researchers to study simpler version of more complex adult physiology. This was not the case and Dawes himself became a spokesman for the importance and complexity of this stage of physiology.

His initial research was conducted into the distribution and control of fetal circulation, mostly in unborn lamb fetus. He studied chemoreceptors, the biological mechanism that start the changes in birth. In particular he studied the onset of breathing, for the implications for human physiology, and changes in the pulmonary and systemic circulations. Dawes was one of the first paediatricians to observe that lamb fetus had sleep cycles as well as breathing cycles In utero. Studies also included the responses to stresses such as hypoxia and hemorrhage. Using this research, he was able to determine and later confirm that human fetus also slept in cycles. This led Dawes to consider the role of the central nervous control, not only in relation to sleep states, but also heart rate variability and responses to the stimulation of chemoreceptors.

Using his research Dawes designed a system of measurement, used in obstetric departments around the world, as the most precise non-invasive way of assessing the well-being of the human fetus.

Dawes was awarded the Gairdner Foundation International Award in 1966 for his outstanding contributions to medical science. He was elected a Fellow of the Royal Society in March 1971.

Dawes was an editor of the British Journal of Pharmacology for many years. He won the James Spence Medal in 1969, that is awarded by the Royal College of Paediatrics and Child Health for outstanding contributions to the advancement or clarification of paediatric knowledge, the Virginia Apgar award of the American Academy of Paediatrics, the Osler Memorial Medal of Oxford University and many more.

Dawes retired in 1985, and took up the post of director of Sunley Research Centre at Charing Cross Hospital, where he worked on both the computerisation of fetal heart rates and on molecular biology. The Nuffield Institute of Medical research which he had directed became part of the Institute of Molecular Medicine, when Dawes finally retired in 1989.

Upon retirement, and still fully fit with an acute mind, he was recruited as first director of the Sunley Research Centre at Charing Cross Hospital. A keen entertainer with his wife Margaret with two sons and two daughters, he died in Oxford, on 6 May 1996, aged 78.

== Publications ==
- Fetal and Neonatal Physiology (1968)

== Awards and honours ==
- 1963 Max Weinstein Award, USA.
- 1966 Gairdner Foundation Award, Canada.
- 1969 James Spence Medal British Paediatric Association. Fellow, Royal College of Obstetricians and Gynaecologists.
- 1971 Fellow, Royal Society, London.
- 1972 Fellow, Royal College of Physicians.
- 1974 Fellow, American Congress of Obstetricians and Gynecologists.
- 1976 Fellow, American Academy of Pediatrics.
- 1981 C.B.E.
- 1981 Blair Bell Gold Medal, Royal Society of Medicine.
- 1982 Honorary DMed University of Gothenburg, Sweden.
- 1990 Osler Memorial Medal, Oxford University.

The Geoffrey Dawes lecture is given annually and organised by the Fetal and Neonatal Physiological Society.
