= David Dunger =

British paediatrician (died 2021)

Professor David Dunger FRCP FRCPCH
- Dunger in his later years
- Education: Great Ormond Street Hospital
- Scientific career
- Fields: Paediatric diabetes and Pediatric endocrinology
- Workplaces: John Radcliffe Hospital, Addenbrooke's Hospital

David Dunger (died 20 July 2021) was a British paediatric endocrinologist and chair of paediatrics at the University of Cambridge. Dunger was most notable for research into three areas, pathogenesis of type 1 diabetes and its complications, perinatal origins of risk for obesity and type 2 diabetes along with experimental medicine.

== Life ==
Dunger undertook his clinical training at Great Ormond Street Hospital, University of London, specialising in paediatric diabetes and paediatric endocrinology achieving a Bachelor of Medicine, Bachelor of Surgery on 1 January 1971.

Dunger died on 20 July 2021.

== Career ==
Between 1986 and 2000 Dunger was Consultant Paediatric Endocrinologist at the John Radcliffe Hospital, University of Oxford. In 2000, Dunger was appointed to Addenbrooke's Hospital and at the same time took up the second Chair of Paediatrics at the University of Cambridge.

== Awards and honours ==
In 2002, Dunger won the Research Award of the European Society for Paediatric Endocrinology for conducting outstanding research in the field. In 2012, Dunger was awarded the Andrea Prader Prize, from the same society, in recognising his outstanding achievements in leadership, teaching and clinical practice in the field of pediatric endocrinology. The award was named in honour of Andrea Prader, the Swiss scientist, pediatric endocrinologist, who discovered Prader–Willi syndrome. He was elected a Fellow of the Academy of Medical Sciences in 2012 and, in 2015, Dunger was awarded the James Spence Medal.

== Bibliography ==
Dunger co-wrote these highly cited articles:

- Burton, Paul R.; Clayton, David G.; Cardon, Lon R.; et al. (7 June 2007). "Genome-wide association study of 14,000 cases of seven common diseases and 3,000 shared controls". Nature. 447 (7145): 661–678. Bibcode:2007Natur.447..661B. doi:10.1038/nature05911. PMC 2719288. PMID 17554300.
- Ong, KK; Ahmed, ML; Emmett, PM; Preece, MA; Dunger, DB (8 April 2000). "Association between postnatal catch-up growth and obesity in childhood: prospective cohort study". BMJ (Clinical Research Ed.). 320 (7240): 967–71. doi:10.1136/bmj.320.7240.967. PMC 27335. PMID 10753147.
- Todd, John A; Walker, Neil M; Cooper, Jason D; et al. (6 June 2007). "Robust associations of four new chromosome regions from genome-wide analyses of type 1 diabetes". Nature Genetics. 39 (7): 857–864. doi:10.1038/ng2068. PMC 2492393. PMID 17554260.
- Metzger, B. E.; Buchanan, T. A.; Coustan, D. R.; et al. (27 June 2007). "Summary and Recommendations of the Fifth International Workshop-Conference on Gestational Diabetes Mellitus". Diabetes Care. 30 (Supplement 2): S251–S260. doi:10.2337/dc07-s225. PMID 17596481.
- Burton, Paul R; Clayton, David G; Cardon, Lon R; et al. (21 October 2007). "Association scan of 14,500 nonsynonymous SNPs in four diseases identifies autoimmunity variants". Nature Genetics. 39 (11): 1329–1337. doi:10.1038/ng.2007.17. PMC 2680141. PMID 17952073.
