= Mary Sheridan =

English paediatrician and public health officer

- Born: 1899; Liverpool, England
- Died: February 14, 1978 (aged 78–79)
- Education: University of Liverpool
- Known for: Speech and language delay in the young child and how it affects hearing STYCAR tests feminism
- Awards: OBE, James Spence Medal (1968)
- Scientific career
- Fields: Pediatrics

Mary Dorothy Sheridan, OBE, FFCM (1899 – 14 February 1978) was an English paediatrician and public health officer who pioneered the study of child development.

== Biography ==
Mary Sheridan was born in Liverpool in 1899. Her father was an Irish general practitioner and her mother was a district nurse. She earned a scholarship to attend the University of Liverpool School of Medicine, graduating in 1922.

Sheridan began her medical career at the Liverpool Royal Infirmary and worked briefly in her father's practice before choosing to train as a paediatrician. She worked as a resident medical officer in several Liverpool children's hospitals before moving to Cheshire to work as a public health officer. She then moved to Manchester to work as an assistant school medical officer, where she noticed that children who had been diagnosed late with hearing, speech and visual impairments suffered in their education. She thought that, in order to diagnose these conditions earlier, a more thorough set of parameters for measuring children's development needed to be established. After the Second World War, having published several papers on speech delay and language delay, she was recruited by George Godber to join the children's department at the Ministry of Health. At the children's department, she authored numerous publications on child development, covering children's play, the link between hearing and speech development, and children with disabilities. She wrote a seminal textbook, From Birth to Five Years, first written in 1960 and published under that title in 1973, which described the normal parameters of children's development to assist in the diagnosis of developmental disorders.

Sheridan began working as a consultant paediatrician at Guy's Hospital in 1962 and resigned from the Ministry of Health in 1964. She continued to perform research and lecture at Guy's Hospital, the Institute of Child Health, and the Nuffield Speech and Language Unit. She was awarded the James Spence Gold Medal of the Royal College of Paediatrics and Child Health in 1968 for research into children's speech and language delays as well as hearing impairment, and developing the STYCAR tests. She also received an OBE. Alongside Dorothy Egan, Sheridan has been credited with establishing developmental paediatrics as a specialty in the United Kingdom.

Sheridan died on 14 February 1978 from a myocardial infarction.
