= Helen Cross (physician) =

British physician

Judith Helen Cross OBE (born 1961) is a British physician who is the Prince of Wales's Chair of Childhood Epilepsy and Honorary Consultant in Paediatric Neurology at Great Ormond Street Hospital for Children NHS Foundation Trust. She is also director of the UCL Great Ormond Street Institute of Child Health, London and a trustee of Young Epilepsy, in Lingfield.

Cross has published on seizure, neuropsychological and behavioural outcomes in children who have undergone surgical resection for treatment of their epilepsy. Her research has focused on improving outcomes for children with early onset epilepsy. Cross' early research was into improving imaging techniques to determine areas of likely seizure onset in children with drug resistant focal epilepsy and has developed an epilepsy surgery programme based on her research.

Cross conducted the first randomized controlled trial of the ketogenic diet in the treatment of children with drug resistant focal epilepsy and is endeavouring to conduct the same in the very young and adults. Recognising there was little in the way of control data with regard to neurodevelopmental progress, she initiated the North London Epilepsy in Infancy study, where a cohort of children was recruited at diagnosis in the first two years of life, and has been followed to at least three years. Cross planned to conduct a similar study over a wider geographical area, also examining phenotypes and genotypes.

In 2015, Cross received an Order Of The British Empire for her services to childhood epilepsy. She was elected a Fellow of the Academy of Medical Sciences in 2026.

== Early career ==
Cross graduated with honours with a Bachelor of Medicine, Bachelor of Surgery from the University of Birmingham Medical School in 1984. She did her paediatric training in Birmingham and joined Great Ormond Street Hospital in 1990.
