= Local education and training board =

Local education and training boards (LETBs) are the thirteen regional structures in the health education and training system of the NHS in England, established as part of the NHS reforms of April 2013. They are statutory committees of Health Education England

== Functions ==
LETBs have three main functions:

- to identify and agree the local needs for education and training - to deliver the right people and skills to meet future service needs
- to plan and commission high quality education and training in its region in order to secure future workforce supply and improve patient outcomes
- support national workforce priorities set by Health Education England

Certain LETBs may take responsibility for the national coordination of education and training of some of the smaller professions, for example HEE West Midlands is the lead commissioner for Healthcare science.

== Regions ==
The 13 LETB regions in the NHS are:

- East Midlands
- East of England
- Yorkshire and the Humber
- Wessex
- Thames Valley
- North West London
- South London
- North Central and East London
- Kent, Surrey and Sussex
- North East
- North West
- West Midlands
- South West
