= UCL Great Ormond Street Institute of Child Health =

Academic department of University College London

Coordinates: 51°31′23″N 0°07′13″W

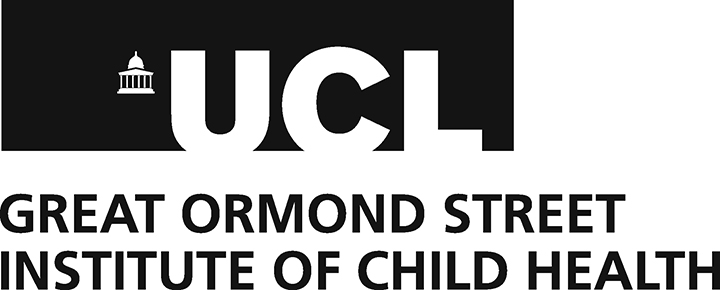
- Established: 1946
- Director: Professor Helen Cross OBE
- Location: London, United Kingdom
- Website: UCL Great Ormond Street Institute of Child Health

The UCL Great Ormond Street Institute of Child Health (ICH) is an academic department of the Faculty of Population Health Sciences of University College London (UCL) and is located in London, United Kingdom. It was founded in 1946 and together with its clinical partner Great Ormond Street Hospital (GOSH), forms the largest concentration of children's health research in Europe. In 1996 the Institute merged with University College London. Current research focusses on broad biomedical topics within child health, ranging from developmental biology, to genetics, to immunology and epidemiology.

== History ==
The Institute of Child Health was founded in 1946 by professor Alan Moncrieff with the funding of a chair in child health by the Nuffield Foundation. It acted as a postgraduate school of preventive and therapeutic paediatrics of Great Ormond Street Hospital for Children and the University of London. Moncrieff served as director until 1964.

== Research ==
ICH's stated mission is to improve the health and wellbeing of children, and the adults they will become, through world-class research, education and public engagement. To further this agenda, ICH joined the Faculty of Biomedical Sciences at University College London in 2006. The research is internationally recognised, with the ICH gaining Grade 5*A in the Higher Education Funding Council for England ratings. The institute also won the Queen's Anniversary Prize for Higher Education in 2000.

Through the enabling of various funding bodies including research councils, charities as well as industry, the Institute annually trains doctoral students, medical students and other postgraduates.

There are five academic programmes in the Institute: Developmental Biology and Cancer, Developmental Neuroscience, Genetics and Genomic Medicine, Infection, Immunity, Inflammation, and Population Policy and Practice.

=== Historical collections ===
The Friends of the Children of Great Ormond Street Library holds a substantial collection of historical books and reprints of papers published by staff at Great Ormond Street Hospital and the Institute of Child Health. The historical collections also include around 2500 volumes on paediatrics and the history of paediatrics, some dating from as early as 1819.

=== Life Study ===
Life Study was a cross-disciplinary research study to look at the health and wellbeing of thousands of children across the UK. It collected a large amount of information on the health, growth and life factors of a new generation of children born in the UK. It was funded by the UK Department for Business, Innovation and Skills (BIS), Economic and Social Research Council (ESRC) and Medical Research Council (MRC), with Professor Carol Dezateux the Director of the project. The Economic and Social Research Council (ESRC) and the Medical Research Council (MRC) discontinued Research Councils’ funding for Life Study in early 2016 due to the challenges encountered in recruiting participants.

== Strategic Partners ==
- Great Ormond Street Hospital for Children NHS Foundation Trust
- GOSH-UCL Biomedical Research Centre (BRC)
- Great Ormond Street Hospital Children's Charity
- Centre for Research into Rare Diseases in Children (CRRDC)
- UCL Partners (UCLP)

== Key facts ==
- In the Research Excellence Framework (REF) 2014, ICH was part of a UCL return to the Clinical Medicine sub-panel of Main Panel A. In this sub-panel, 80% of UCL research was assessed as either world-leading (43%) or internationally excellent (37%). In the assessment of research power, UCL's performance was top in the UK.
- Research grant income is around £32m per annum
- Bibliometric assessment of journal articles has placed ICH/GOSH in the top five children's academic medical centres in the world. It was joint third for citation impact, fourth for most highly cited papers and fifth on the number of publications. NB.
- Thirteen Professors are Fellows of the Academy of Medical Sciences
- Ten Professors are National Institute for Health and Care Research (NIHR) Senior Investigators
- ICH leads the Child Health component of the UCL undergraduate medical degree for approximately 370 students each year, a vital component of training tomorrow’s doctors.
- ICH has nearly 400 postgraduate students, half of whom are undertaking taught programmes (Masters, PG Diploma and PG Certificate) and half of whom are research students (MRes, PhD).

NB. Paper numbers, percentage of highly cited papers and 5-year average citation impact (Evidence, Thomson Reuters Business) comparing papers published between 1988 and 2012 from GOSH/ICH with its international comparators.

== Notable faculty ==
Notable faculty of the institute, past and present, include:

- Professor Sir Al Aynsley-Green, became Nuffield Professor of Child Health 1993 and Children's Commissioner (2005-2009).
- Professor Sir Cyril Chantler, received a knighthood for his services to medicine in 1996, a former chairman of the board of Great Ormond Street Hospital, and chair of UCL Partners 2009–2014.
- Professor Carol Dezateux CBE, former head of the Centre for Paediatric Epidemiology and Biostatistics at ICH, and now director of the Life Study
- Professor Philip Graham, former dean of the institute, between 1985 and 1990
- Professor Christine Kinnon, deputy director (education) at ICH and vice-dean for education, Faculty of Population Health Sciences at UCL.
- Professor Catherine Law CBE, deputy director (strategy & partnerships) at ICH.
- Professor Roland Levinsky, former dean and director of the institute, between 1990 and 1999.
- Professor June Lloyd, former Nuffield Professor of Child Health, between 1984-
- Professor Catherine Peckham CBE, who established the Centre for Paediatric Epidemiology and Biostatistics at the institute.
- Professor John Soothill, the Hugh Greenwood Professor of Immunology between 1965 and 1985.
- Professor Rosalind Smyth, former director of the institute.
- Professor Terence Stephenson, Nuffield Professor of Child Health and chair of the Academy of Medical Royal Colleges.
- Professor Otto Wolff, Nuffield Professor of Child Health, former dean of the institute, between 1982 and 1985.
- Professor Eleanor Main, first professor of physiotherapy at UCL and programme director for postgraduate physiotherapy at UCL since 2005.

== See also ==
- Healthcare in London
