= Otto Herbert Wolff =

German born medical scientist

- Otto Wolff being awarded James Spence medal.
- Born: 10 January 1920; Hamburg, Germany
- Died: 27 April 2010 (aged 90)
- Education: Peterhouse, Cambridge, Cambridge University
- Known for: lipoprotein electrophoresis, recognition of abetalipoproteinaemia.
- Awards: CBE, Dawson Williams Memorial Prize, James Spence Medal
- Scientific career
- Fields: Pediatrics, Biomedical science
- Workplaces: St Olave's Hospital, University of Birmingham, Great Ormond Street Hospital, University of London

Otto Herbert Wolff, CBE, FRCP (born 10 January 1920 in Hamburg, died 27 April 2010) was a German born medical scientist, paediatrician and was the Nuffield Professor of Child Health at Great Ormond Street Hospital. Wolff was notable for being one of the first paediatricians in Britain to set up a clinic for obese children. Later research into plasma lipids with Harold Salt pioneered the techniques of lipoprotein electrophoresis. He later conducted research into the role of lipid disturbance in childhood as a precursor of coronary artery disease and his recognition in 1960 of the rare condition of abetalipoproteinaemia. Wolff was also co-discoverer of the Edwards syndrome in abnormal chromosomes.

== Life ==
Wolff was born the younger of two boys. Wolff's British father, Herbert Arnold Jacob Wolff, was a GP, who was born in Manchester to a British mother and his mother was Anna Samson, was the daughter of a lawyer. Wolff therefore had dual nationality. Herbert Wolff was a doctor, who served in the German Army during World War I, and during the interwar period, lived as a comfortable family in Germany.

Wolff's early schooling took place in Hamburg, and despite his Jewish background, was well received by his classmates. However, when he turned 16, Wolff was sent to London to study at a Cram school, so that he could earn a place at Cambridge University to study Medicine, a position his brother Heinz already held. In 1937, the whole family emigrated to England, but upon arriving, his father realised that his medical degree from the University of Strasbourg was not recognised in the UK. So Herbert Arnold Jacob Wolff studied medicine at School of Medical Sciences, University of Manchester while both his sons studied medicine in Cambridge. Wolff earned a place at Peterhouse college.

== Career ==
Wolff started his clinical career at University College Hospital, that had to be evacuated to Cardiff due to the Blitz and qualified in medicine in 1943, and then held a number of junior posts at St Olave's Hospital in London.

In 1944, close to the end of World War II, Wolff joined the Royal Army Medical Corps, attaining the rank of Captain, and was in charge of a smallpox hospital. When the theatre moved to Italy, Wolff found he was responsible for the caring of Italian prisoners of war. When Wolff found that a prisoner was ill, they would be allowed home to their families, and Wolff found it was hard to maintain a doubtful view when ailments were often fictitious.

During 1947, Wolff was demobilised. When returning from war, Wolff had a chance meeting with a senior doctor, that resulted in Wolff taking a position at the University of Birmingham to train in paediatrics. Working under the consultant Sir Leonard Parsons, Wolff become a registrar. In 1951, Wolff started work at the University of Birmingham becoming a lecturer in the Department of Child Health. Wolf finished his academic career at Birmingham University as a reader under Professor Sir Douglas Hubble. During the period while he was attending the university, Wolff received laboratory training and the scientific basis of medicine. He discovered Abetalipoproteinemia, a disorder of blood lipids, that interferes with the normal absorption of fat and fat-soluble vitamins from food, and designed new special diets for babies with phenylketonuria, an inborn error of metabolism that results in decreased metabolism of the amino acid phenylalanine Wolff also provided the first description of the genetic disorder, i.e. the chromosomal abnormality that leads to Edwards syndrome. In 1960, Wolff along with several other co-authors wrote a paper on the condition.

In 1965, Wolff moved to London and was appointed the second Nuffield Professor of Child Health at the Institute of Child Health and consultant paediatrician at Great Ormond Street Hospital and the University of London. The previous Nuffield Professor was Sir Alan Moncrieff. Wolff was the first trained scientist to work within pediatrics, in a clinical chair in the UK, and used the position to push the scientific based treatment of babies and the very young. During his time at the institute, Wolff turned was as essentially a collection of pre-war cottage hospitals into a world class centre for children.

Wolf's work after World War II helped to establish the formation of the Royal College of Paediatrics and Child Health.

== Awards and honours ==
Wolff was Knighted in 1985 with a CBE.

In 1985 Wolff was awarded the Dawson Williams Memorial Prize from the British Medical Association, and in 1986 the medal of the Association Française pour le Dépistage et le Prévention des Maladies Métaboliques et des Handicaps de l’Enfant. 1987 brought the Harding Award from the Action Research for the Crippled Child, later the Action Medical Research. Wolff was awarded the prestigious James Spence Medal in 1988, by the Royal College of Paediatrics and Child Health.

== Bibliography ==
These are some of Otto Wolff's most important papers.

- SALT, HB; WOLFF, OH; LLOYD, JK; FOSBROOKE, AS; CAMERON, AH; HUBBLE, DV. (13 August 1960). "On having no beta-lipoprotein. A syndrome comprising a-beta-lipoproteinaemia, acanthocytosis, and steatorrhoea". Lancet. 2 (7146): 325–9. doi:10.1016/s0140-6736(60)91478-1. PMID 13745738.
- Stark, O; Atkins, E; Wolff, OH (1981). "Longitudinal study of obesity in the National Survey of Health and Development". BMJ. 283 (6283). BMJ Publishing Group Ltd: 13–17. doi:10.1136/bmj.283.6283.13. PMC 1506053. PMID 6788242.
- Muller, D.P.R; Lloyd, June K.; Wolff, O.H (29 January 1983). "Vitamin E and Neurological Function". The Lancet. 321 (8318): 225–228. doi:10.1016/S0140-6736(83)92598-9. PMID 6130255. S2CID 30492091.
- Lloyd, June K.; Wolff, O. H.; Whelen, W. S. (15 July 1961). "Childhood Obesity". British Medical Journal. 2 (5245): 145–148. doi:10.1136/bmj.2.5245.145. ISSN 0007-1447. PMC 1969164. PMID 13762916.
- Smith, I.; Clayton, B.E.; Wolff, O.H. (17 May 1975). "New Variant of Phenylketonuria with Progressive Neurological Illness Unresponsive to Phenylalanine Restriction". The Lancet. 305 (7916): 1108–1111. doi:10.1016/S0140-6736(75)92498-8. ISSN 0140-6736. PMID 49470. S2CID 19404792.
- WOLFF, O. H. (1955). "Obesity in childhood: a study of the birth weight, the height, and the onset of puberty" (pdf). Quarterly Journal of Medicine. 24 (94): 109–123. ISSN 0033-5622. PMID 14395422.
- HADORN, B; TARLOW, M. J.; LLOYD, J. K.; WOLFF, O. H. (1969). "Intestinal enterokinase deficiency". The Lancet. 1 (7599): 812–813. doi:10.1016/s0140-6736(69)92071-6. PMID 4180366.
- Smith, I.; Lobascher, M.E.; Stevenson, J.E.; Wolff, O.H.; Schmidt, H.; rubel-Kaiser, S.; Bickel, H. (9 September 1978). "Effect of stopping low-phenylalanine diet on intellectual progress of children with phenylketonuria". Br Med J. 2 (6139). BMJ Publishing Group Ltd: 723–726. doi:10.1136/bmj.2.6139.723. PMC 1607584. PMID 698696.
- Baar, H.S.; Wolff, O.H. (20 April 1957). "Pancreatic Necrosis in Cortisone-Treated Children". The Lancet. 269 (6973): 812–815. doi:10.1016/S0140-6736(57)90974-1. ISSN 0140-6736. PMID 13417603.
- Milla, PJ; Aggett, PJ; Wolff, OH; Harries, JT (1957). "Studies in primary hypomagnesaemia: evidence for defective carrier-mediated small intestinal transport of magnesium". Gut. 20 (11). BMJ Publishing Group: 1028–1033. doi:10.1136/gut.20.11.1028. ISSN 0017-5749. PMC 1412682. PMID 527871.
- Smith, Isabel; Beasley, Martin G.; Wolff, Otto H.; Ades, Anthony E. (March 1988). "Behavior disturbance in 8-year-old children with early treated phenylketonuria: Report from the MRC/DHSS phenylketonuria register". The Journal of Pediatrics. 112 (3): 403–408. doi:10.1016/S0022-3476(88)80320-2. ISSN 0022-3476. PMID 3346777.
