= James Holmes Hutchison =

- Jim Hutchison
- Born: 16 April 1912; Rangoon, Burma
- Died: 27 December 1987 (aged 75)
- Education: Glasgow University
- Awards: FRCP, CBE
- Scientific career
- Fields: Pediatrics, childhood tuberculosis
- Workplaces: Royal Hospital for Sick Children, Glasgow, Royal Scottish Society for the Prevention of Cruelty to Children

James Holmes Hutchison CBE FRSE (born 16 April 1912 – died 27 December 1987) was a Scottish paediatrician and Samson Gemmell Professor of Child Heath at Glasgow University from 1961 to 1977. From 1977 onwards he was professor of child health at the University of Hong Kong. Friends knew him as Jim Hutchison.

The book Hutchison's Paediatrics was named in his honour in 2012.

== Life ==
Hutchison was born in Rangoon, the son of Alexander Hutchison and his wife Catherine Holmes. His family came to Scotland in 1920. He attended the High School in Glasgow then studied medicine at Glasgow University graduating MB ChB in 1934. Hutchison served his internship in the Royal Hospital for Sick Children, Glasgow. Hutchison received his doctorate (MD) and the Bellahouston Medal in 1939.

During the Second World War, he attained the rank of lieutenant colonel in the Royal Army Medical Corps, with missions in France, Algeria, Italy and Austria. He was awarded an Order of the British Empire for his medical efforts in 1945.

== Career ==
Hutchison returned to the Royal Hospital for Sick children in Glasgow after the war, also accepting the Leonard Gow Lectureship in Medical Diseases of Childhood and Infancy. Hutchison specialised in tuberculosis in childhood and worked on thyroid diseases with Prof Edward McGirr.

He was President of the Royal Medico-Chirurgical Society 1958–59. In 1963 he was elected a member of the Harveian Society of Edinburgh and served as president in 1976. In 1965 he was elected a Fellow of the Royal Society of Edinburgh. His proposers were Thomas Symington, Paul Bacsich, Robert Campbell Garry, and George Montgomery. He was President of the Royal College of Physicians and Surgeons of Glasgow 1966 to 1968. He was created a Commander of the Order of the British Empire (CBE) in 1971.

Hutchison was also President of the British Paediatric Association and of the Association of Physicians of Great Britain and Ireland. He was Chairman of the Scottish Health Services Council and of the Royal Scottish Society for the Prevention of Cruelty to Children.

== Family ==
He married Agnes T A Goodall (known as Ness) in 1940 shortly before his overseas posting in the war.

== Publications ==
- Practical Paediatric Problems (1964 plus later editions)
