= Wilfrid Payne =

British pediatrician

- Wilfrid Payne identity picture.
- Born: 25 March 1894; Brighton, England
- Died: 28 December 1978 (aged 84)
- Education: Guy's Hospital
- Known for: A number of areas including the development of flame photometry and for research into metabolic diseases.
- Scientific career
- Fields: Pediatrics, Biochemistry and Clinical chemistry
- Workplaces: Great Ormond Street Hospital; Queen Charlotte’s Hospital; Hammersmith Hospital; Bristol Royal Hospital for Children

Wilfrid Walter Payne FRCP (25 March 1894 in Brighton – 28 December 1978) was a British pediatrician with his job title also being biochemist and chemical pathologist He was notable for developing flame photometry and chromatography, enzymology, fat balances and chylomicron counting, and for conducting research on gastroenteritis, calcium and phosphorus metabolism, and on coeliac and fibrocystic diseases.

== Life ==
Payne was the son of William Henry Payne, an accountant with the London, Brighton and South Coast Railway, and his wife, Alice Flora Smith. He was educated at Brighton Grammar School. His education at Guy's Hospital was interrupted by the start of World War I. He volunteered into the Royal Naval Reserve, serving as sub-lieutenant, spending the last two years of the war working on destroyers. In 1920, he completed his undergraduate training, and qualified at Guys, taking on a number of roles, eventually becoming medical assistant. During 1921, Payne married Winifred Grace, and had two children, a son and daughter.

In 1926, Payne transferred to Great Ormond Street Hospital, initially working as a chemist. His job specification name changed a number of times during his career. When he retired in 1959, from the medical profession, which was now called National Health Service, he immediately went back to work, working at the Queen Charlotte's Hospital for three years, followed by 7 years with the Neonatal Unit at Hammersmith Hospital. In 1968, Payne's first wife died. In 1971, he married Anne King. Payne moved to Bristol in 1969, where he worked in the Child Health Unit at the Bristol Royal Hospital for Children until 1973, when he finally retired.

== Bibliography ==
Payne was considered a man of prodigious output but did little writing. These are his most important papers and all apart from the third paper were produced jointly.

- Payne, W. W.; Poulton, E. P. (1 October 1923). "Visceral Pain in the Upper Alimentary Tract". QJM: An International Journal of Medicine. os-17 (65): 53–80. doi:10.1093/qjmed/os-17.65.53.
- Hale-White, R.; Payne, W. W. (1 April 1926). "The Dextrose Tolerance Curve in Health". QJM: An International Journal of Medicine. 19 (75): 393–410. doi:10.1093/qjmed/os-19.75.393.
- LIGHTWOOD, R.; PAYNE, W. W.; BLACK, J. A. (1 December 1953). "Infantile Renal Acidosis". Pediatrics. 12 (6). American Academy of Pediatrics: 628–644. ISSN 0031-4005. PMID 13120281.
- Payne, Wilfrid W. (1956). "Renal tubular defects in childhood". Pediatrics. 17 (1). American Academy of Pediatrics: 84–92. ISSN 0031-4005. PMID 13280312.
- Cochrane, W. A.; Payne, W. W.; Simpkiss, M. J.; Woolf, L. I. (April 1956). "Familial Hypoglycemia Precipitated by Amino Acids". The Journal of Clinical Investigation. 34 (4): 411–422. doi:10.1172/JCI103292. PMC 438826. PMID 13306783.
- Free diet in the treatment of diabetes mellitus
- Lawson, David; Moncrieff, Alan; Payne, Wilfrid W. (April 1960). "Forty Years of Nephrosis in Childhood". Archives of Disease in Childhood. 35 (180). BMJ Publishing Group: 115–126. doi:10.1136/adc.35.180.115. PMC 2012523. PMID 14414748.

== Awards and accolades ==
Payne received the Dawson Williams Memorial Prize in 1959 and the James Spence Medal in 1971.
