= Action Medical Research =

British medical research charity

- Founded: 1952
- Founder: Duncan Guthrie
- Registration no.: 208701
- Purpose: Medical Research into Children’s Diseases
- Location: United Kingdom
- Key people: Charles Guthrie, Baron Guthrie of Craigiebank.
- Website: www.action.org.uk

Action Medical Research, previously The National Fund for Research into Crippling Diseases, is a British medical research charity, founded in 1952, that funds research to prevent and treat disease and disability in babies and children.

Its aims include:

- tackling premature birth and treating sick and vulnerable babies
- helping children affected by disability, disabling conditions and infections
- targeting rare diseases that affect children.

It does this by:

- identifying and funding UK medical research most likely to benefit babies, children and young people
- assessing the impact of the funded research and sharing the results
- raising research funding

== History ==
Founded in 1952 as the National Fund for Poliomyelitis Research by Duncan Guthrie, the charity's original aim was the eradication of polio. During the 1940s and 1950s, epidemics of paralytic poliomyelitis were frequent in the UK, and the charity helped to fund the first British polio vaccine. After the steep reduction in paralytic poliomyelitis resulting from the introduction of the vaccine, the charity's activities diversified. It became The National Fund for Research into Poliomyelitis and Other Crippling Diseases in 1960 and The National Fund for Research into Crippling Diseases in 1967, becoming known informally as Action Research for the Crippled Child. It was renamed Action Research in 1990, and became Action Medical Research in 2003. The World Health Organization's 2002 declaration that Europe is free from polio coincided with the charity's fiftieth anniversary.

Guthrie, the founder, initially sought to raise funds to defeat polio, a condition that affected the lives of many thousands of children including his own daughter Janet. His mission was realised when within 10 years, the first UK polio vaccines were introduced. Since then the charity has supported many significant medical breakthroughs – breakthroughs that have helped save thousands of children’s lives and changed many more.

== Projects and breakthroughs ==
A major focus has been on pregnancy and conditions affecting babies, with involvement in projects including the rubella vaccine, ultrasound scanning in pregnancy, intrauterine blood typing, folic acid in the prevention of spina bifida, and the diagnosis of retinopathy in premature babies. Projects in older children include diet in liver disease and treatment of burns in children. Other projects include treatments for epilepsy. The charity has also been involved in hip replacement surgery and the development of aids for the elderly and severely disabled, including communication aids, the shapeable 'matrix' wheelchair and the 'Tools for Living' programme. The charity has also funded research into osteoporosis, nerve repair, hydrocephalus and myasthenia gravis.

Breakthroughs – helping more babies by:

- Helping introduce ultrasound scanning in pregnancy.
- Discovering the importance of taking folic acid before and during pregnancy to help prevent spina bifida in babies.
- Developing an infra-red scanner to help minimise the risk of brain damage in babies.
- Pioneering a unique portable fetal heart rate monitor to make pregnancy safer for babies at risk.
- Contributing to the development of groundbreaking cooling therapy to prevent brain damage in newborn babies deprived of oxygen at birth, reducing the risk of death and severe disability (now being adopted in UK hospitals).
- Helping develop routine screening for congenital hypothyroidism (CHT – a thyroid disorder in newborn babies) which was introduced in the early 1980s for all newborn babies across the UK.
- Funding research to reduce stillbirth, which led to new advice for pregnant women to go to sleep on their side, rather than their back, in the third trimester of pregnancy, helping to save around 130 babies a year in the UK.

Breakthroughs – supporting children with disabilities by:

- Developing a revolutionary growing prosthesis – artificial limb bone – for children whose bones have been destroyed by tumours.
- Creating the award-winning adjustable Matrix Seating System to help support physically disabled children as they grow.
- Devising the Paediatric Pain Profile to help parents and health professionals to assess and relieve pain in severely disabled children.
- Testing the eyePoint scale which is now in use across the world and helps medical professionals and families better understand how well severely disabled children can use their eyes to communicate.
- Developing MoodmApper, a new app to help teenagers with ADHD.
- Helping bring dedicated eye services to children in special schools across the UK.

Breakthroughs – protecting children from infections by:

- Helping develop the first polio vaccines in the UK.
- Supporting the lead researcher whose team helped establish a vaccine for Hib meningitis which is now a routine immunisation.
- Testing the early rubella vaccine – which became part of the MMR vaccine.

Breakthroughs – finding the causes of and developing treatments for diseases by:

- Finding a number of genetic changes that cause blindness in children as well as developing a test to help explain the causes of specific eyesight problems.
- Identifying the genes responsible for rare and devastating conditions such as Von Hippel-Lindau disease, which causes tumours to grow on many parts of the body, Van der Woude syndrome, a form of cleft lip and palate, and for the hereditary skin condition incontinentia pigmenti – which causes severe blistering of the skin.
- Discovering the genes that are linked to Epileptic spasms (also known as infantile epilepsy or West syndrome) which causes a loss of muscle strength, sight and hearing.
- Identifying seven new genes which cause Jeune syndrome (a rare inherited and life-threatening condition), supporting families and doctors to better manage the treatment and care of babies and children affected by the condition.
- Helping develop gene therapy treatments for the life-limiting condition Duchenne muscular dystrophy.
- Supporting researchers to develop a new technique to help some children with epilepsy, which uses new ways of electrically stimulating different parts of the brain.
- Identifying four new genes linked with and improving genetic testing for Perrault syndrome, a rare inherited condition that causes hearing loss in boys and girls, and severe reproductive problems in girls.

== Funding ==
Action Medical Research raises funds through a variety of activities including events, legacies, a trust, weekly lottery, donations, appeals and corporate support.
