= Alan Moncrieff =

British paediatrician and professor emeritus

Professor Sir Alan Aird Moncrieff
- Born: 9 October 1901; Bournemouth, England
- Died: 24 July 1971 (aged 69)
- Education: Caterham School Middlesex Hospital
- Known for: first premature-baby unit in 1947, hospital visits.
- Awards: CBE, MRCS, FRCP, OBE, LRCP
- Scientific career
- Fields: Pediatrics
- Workplaces: Great Ormond Street Hospital, Queen Elizabeth Hospital for Children, Queen Charlotte's and Chelsea Hospital, Royal Postgraduate Medical School, Medical Research Council, UNICEF, Centre Internationale de l'Enfance, World Health Organization

Sir Alan Aird Moncrieff, CBE, FRCP, FRCOG, JP (9 October 1901 – 24 July 1971) was a British paediatrician and professor emeritus at University of London. He was most notable for developing the first premature-baby unit in 1947. It was Moncrieff who recognised and developed the concept of daily parental visits to the ward, which he developed while at Great Ormond Street, well before the need for this became recognised, and with his ward sister, A M Walton, published an article on Hospital Visiting for Children in 1949.

== Biography ==
Moncrieff was born in East Cliff Manse, St Johns Wood Road, Bournemouth, the eldest surviving son of Rev. William Moncrieff, a Congregational Minister, and Isabella Masterson. After attending the local Council school, he received his early education at Caterham School and received a scholarship to train at the Middlesex Hospital Medical School and qualified in 1922 with a Conjoint diploma. A year later, he graduated with an M.B. B.S. with honours and distinction in medical and surgery, and won the University medal.

In 1928, Moncrieff was married to Honor Wedmore, and they had two sons and a daughter. His wife died in 1954, and in following year, he married Mary Katherine Wedmore.

== Career ==
Between 1922 and 1934, Moncrieff worked at various positions including the Middlesex Hospital in London and the Great Ormond Street Hospital also in London, starting initially as a resident and later professing to being a medical registrar. During this period he obtained experience in general practice, working as a Locum tenens. In 1923-24 he worked in Paris in the health division of the International Federation of Red Cross and Red Crescent Societies, while attending lectures and clinical demonstrations in the children's hospital there. In 1925 he returned to Britain, and proceeded to take the MD London in 1925 and MRCP in the same year. Between 1930–31, he studied in Hamburg and other parts of Germany, while holding a Rockefeller Travelling Medical Fellowship. His studies at this time were related to the special problems of neonatal respiratory failure including asphyxia in newborn babies. Using the material from his research and a grant from the Medical Research Council he produced a report which he used to provide the Goulstonian Lecture.

In 1933, Moncrieff was appointed a paediatrics doctor to Queen Charlotte's Maternity Hospital and remained working there until 1951 and the Hammersmith Hospital from 1935 to 1964. In 1934, he was appointed to the consultant staff of both the Middlesex Hospital and the Great Ormond Street Hospital as physician. All the appointments were interrupted by the World War II, when he worked at the Emergency Medical Service.

After the war, when the Institute of Child Health was founded at the Great Ormond Street Hospital in 1946, Moncrieff was appointed first Nuffield Chair of Child Health at the University of London and Director of the institute, a position he held until 1964, which was based across the hospitals, Queen Elizabeth Hospital for Children, Hackney, the Royal Postgraduate Medical School, Hammersmith, and at Great Ormond Street. Neonatal problems remained a lifelong interest for him, as shown by his development in 1947 of the premature baby unit that was one of the first units of its type and became the foremost of its kind in London. This unit was incorporated into the Institute of Child Health. Over the next several years, the institute was developed by Moncrieff, into an organisation of postgraduate paediatric teaching at the beginning, in co-operation with the Institute of Education, in developing a department of growth and development. Frank Falkner was responsible for this department from 1953 onwards, followed by James Mourilyan Tanner. In 1946, he played a prominent part in establishing the National Prenatal Mortality Survey, which would later lead to the National Child Development Study. It was Moncrieff more than anybody else, who established preventative and social paediatrics with Europe. In 1949, he wrote "Visiting Children in Hospital" along with A M Walton, where they advocated and encouraged daily visits by parents to their sick children in hospital.

The next few years were spent assisting in the organisation of child health services in Hertfordshire, where he lived, and in continuing his work on phenylketonuria, until he suffered a stroke in 1968 and had to drastically reduce his working habits.

== External work ==
During his long career, Moncrieff worked on several Home Office and Ministry of Health committees. One of the most prominent was the central training council in childcare. He worked in advisory capacity on the Ingleby committee for children and young people. He provided expert advice for the formation of the Children's Act 1948 which laid the foundations of social care of children and young people by local authorities, in those instances when the child was without parents or whose parents could not look after them.

He has a position at the Medical Research Council, as an expert advisor, on the clinical research board. He acted on the expert advisory panel on maternal and child health panel. of the World Health Organization As a member of the British Medical Association, he worked for many years on its committees. In 1967, he became chairman of the Central Midwives' Board. He was the British representative on the executive board of UNICEF. He worked on the Journal Publishing Subcommittee, becoming its chairman in 1950. He also served on the Journal Committee of the BMA, becoming it chairman in 1967.

As a Justice of the peace, he worked in the juvenile courts in London.

== Bibliography ==
Moncrieff wrote widely on matters relating to diseases of children, and from 1934 to 1945, he was co-editor of Archives of Disease in Childhood. He was The Times medical correspondent for a number of years, which helped him financially, as honorary physician on the staff of a teaching hospital there was no salary, and earnings in private pediatric medicine were considered meager. This increased greatly the number of extra hours that Moncrieff had to work, but enabled him to support his mother. He wrote the following:

- Practitioner handbooks., Alan A. Moncrieff; Humphry Davy Rolleston. 1936
- Infant feeding., Alan A. Moncrieff
- The management of the new-born baby : a guide for midwives. Alan A. Moncrieff., 1943
- Modern diagnosis., Alan A. Moncrieff; William A. R. Thomson, 1946
- Psychology in general practice., Alan A. Moncrieff. 1946
- Practical motherhood and parentcraft. A comprehensive guide to successful parenthood., Alan A Moncrieff
- Child health. Alan Moncrieff; William A. R. Thomson. 1952
- Child health and the state. London, Oxford University Press. 1953
- Diseases of children. Vol 1., 5th Edition by Alan A. Moncrieff; Philip Evans, 1953
- Diseases of children. Vol 2., 5th Edition by Alan A. Moncrieff; Philip Evans. 1953
- Progress in nursing; a survey of recent developments in medicine and surgery. Alan A. Moncrieff; Kathleen Audrey Barbara Fowler, 1954
- The changing child., Alan A. Moncrieff 1956
- Textbook on the nursing and diseases of sick children, for nurses Vol 1, by various authors. Ed. by A. P. Norman. 1966
- Treatment of phenylketonuria : Report to the Medical Research Council of the conference on phenylketonuria. Alan A. Moncrieff; Medical Research Council. 1963

== Awards ==
In 1934, he was elected to a Fellow of the Royal College of Physicians in 1934. In 1952, he was appointed a CBE and later Knighted in the 1964 Birthday Honours. He was made an honorary Fellow of the Royal College of Obstetricians and Gynaecologists in 1958. In 1968, he received a Légion d'honneur in 1958, reflecting on the critical collaboration he conducted in the international coordinated study on growth, with Professor Robert Debré and the Centre Internationale de l’Enfance on Paris. In 1952 he was Charles West lecturer at the Royal College of Physicians. In 1961 he was awarded the James Spence Gold Medal of Royal College of Paediatrics and Child Health, for developing the first premature-baby unit in 1947. In 1964 he was awarded the title of Professor Emeritus of the University of London.
