= Senior registrar =

This article primarily explains the Senior Registrar doctor grade within the United Kingdom until 1996

A Senior Registrar was a grade of doctor in the United Kingdom or Ireland before being superseded during reforms in the 1990s. The senior registrar post still exists in Australia, whilst in the US, the title of “Senior Registrar” might be applied to a Senior or Chief Resident in Surgery.

== Role profile ==
Senior Registrars (SRs) were medical (or dental) practitioners who were undertaking, or had completed, several years of higher level training in a hospital specialty or Public Health, but had not yet gained a position as consultant (either by choice or because the competition was too stiff), thus differentiating them from the modern day Specialist registrars who are still completing training.

Usually, but not invariably, a higher qualification such as the membership or fellowship of one of the Royal Colleges and, in the more competitive specialties, several publications in peer-reviewed journals, would have been obtained at the Senior House Officer or Registrar level, a short or long time before obtaining the Senior Registrar post.

As well as gaining clinical, teaching and administrative experience, SRs were expected to do research: usually clinical, but sometimes laboratory-based, even in clinical specialties. Several publications were expected. Some tried to obtain a higher degree: in earlier days normally an MD or ChM (or the local variant), but in later times a few aimed at a PhD (which involved more formal supervision) instead. Research for a PhD could be done part-time. Sometimes a higher degree would have been obtained before the SR appointment. This was also the most convenient stage for a minority of psychiatrists to undergo personal analysis as part of their psychotherapy training.

== Availability ==
The numbers of these posts were limited, with the aim of roughly corresponding to the numbers of vacancies expected for Consultant or Senior Lecturer posts in the National Health Service or medical schools, so in many fields competition was more severe at the level of entry to the SR grade than for consultant posts.

Latterly Senior Registrars each had a National Training Number (NTN), which they relinquished on leaving training on obtaining a Certificate of Completion of Training (CCT): later changed to Certificate of Completion of Specialist Training (CCST) and now replaced by CT. Sometimes the same department would contain both registrars with higher qualifications waiting for a SR post and a senior registrar with NTN, who could be doing similar clinical work and research. In some other systems, such as that of Canada, there was no such externally imposed limit on trainee numbers.

== Description ==
Full-time academics (lecturers and some research fellows) could sometimes be upgraded from Honorary Registrar to Honorary Senior Registrar (with NTN) at an interview, without the open competition otherwise required.

There was also a side pathway for academics with an international reputation (shown by publications and presentations abroad) to get onto the General Medical Council's Specialist Register (and thus become eligible for an NHS consultant appointment) on the strength of their research, without having the clinical experience normally required for any particular specialty. This was justified by the likelihood of such a person having a tertiary-referral post as part of a team in an academic centre.

SRs could, especially towards the end of their training, be given similar responsibility to a consultant, but there was normally a named consultant with clinical responsibility for each junior doctor's activities. Locum consultant appointments could be taken by a SR (or sometimes a trainee at a lower grade, or an experienced person with no higher qualification) while retaining their SR post. It was also possible to go abroad to do research for a defined period.

== Progression ==
Senior Registrars had their progress reviewed annually by a local committee of senior clinicians and academics, in force long before the other training grades such as Senior House Officer and Registrar had any supervisory responsibility and continued in the successor grades of Specialist Registrar (SpR) and Specialty Registrar (StR). The post duration depended on competition, while it wasn't unusual for women holding part-time posts to take twice as many years in higher training. A doctor may have a reasonable degree of certainty that they could progress to consultant status upon becoming a senior registrar, typically after the completion of at least four years in the role.

Old-style senior registrars would typically serve around 10 years in their speciality, working around 4000 hours annually. Some people changed speciality at this level (e.g. from cardiology to geriatrics), switched to general practice, or went abroad, though a certain amount of retraining might be required. After training in a subspecialty, the post obtained might be in a broader subject. In general practice a trainee might have to spend a year as a registrar as there were no senior registrars.

== Restructuring ==
During the Calman reforms of 1996, the post was replaced by a unified Specialist registrar training grade, with the intention being to reduce specialist training to five years.
