= Royal College of Paediatrics and Child Health =

UK professional body for paediatricians

Coordinates: 51.52071°N 0.11583°W

- Founded: 1928; 98 years ago
- Headquarters: Theobald's Road, London
- Location: United Kingdom
- Members: 22,000 (2024)
- President: Steve Turner
- Publication: Archives of Disease in Childhood
- Website: www.rcpch.ac.uk

The Royal College of Paediatrics and Child Health (RCPCH) is the professional body for paediatricians (doctors specialising in child health) in the United Kingdom. It is responsible for the postgraduate training of paediatricians and conducts the Membership of the Royal College of Paediatrics and Child Health (MRCPCH) exams. It also awards the Diploma in Child Health (DCH), which is taken by many doctors who plan a career in general practice. Members of the college use the postnominal initials 'MRCPCH' while Fellows use 'FRCPCH'.

== History ==
The United Kingdom's first national group of paediatricians was established in 1928 as the British Paediatric Association or BPA. Its first president was George Frederic Still. The BPA's initial aims were the advancement of the study of paediatrics and the promotion of friendship amongst paediatricians. Most paediatricians also belonged to the Royal College of Physicians and took the examination MRCP(Paeds). The BPA was granted royal college status in August 1996. The MRCP(Paeds) exam was replaced by the MRCPCH in 1999.

The College's official journal, the Archives of Disease in Childhood, was founded in 1926.

The RCPCH's first home was in Hallam Street, London. On 21 March 2008 the College moved to new premises at 5-11 Theobalds Road, London, where it is still based.

== Aims of the College ==
The RCPCH's stated aim is to 'transform child health through knowledge, innovation and expertise'. In practice it has a number of roles:

- Postgraduate training for paediatricians: the RCPCH defines the paediatric curriculum, advises Local Education and Training Boards and records and monitors trainees' progress from entry to specialist training to achieving the certificate of completion of training (CCT).
- Running examinations: both the MRCPCH, considered an essential qualification for British paediatricians, and the DCH, a qualification in child health for non-paediatricians.
- Provides courses and e-learning resources.
- Campaigns to improve child health nationally and globally.
- Organises research conferences, notably the RCPCH Annual Conference.
- Publishes the Archives of Disease in Childhood, a peer-reviewed journal of paediatrics.
- Develops clinical guidelines and standards.

The college works closely with other bodies, including the Department of Health (United Kingdom), the Local Education and Training Boards, the Postgraduate Medical Education and Training Board, the General Medical Council, the National Clinical Assessment Service (NCAS), the National Institute for Health and Clinical Excellence (NICE), children's charities and the other medical royal colleges.

== Fellowship ==
Senior doctors who have completed paediatric training can apply for Fellowship of the RCPCH, after which they can use the letters FRCPCH.

== Coat of arms ==
The coat of arms of the college commemorate June Lloyd, first female President of the British Paediatric Association and Thomas Phaire, whose Boke of Chyldren from 1545 was the first book on paediatrics in English. The crest is a baby, taken from the arms of the Foundling Hospital in Coram's Fields.

== List of presidents of the Royal College of Paediatrics and Child Health ==
The President is the elected head of the Royal College of Paediatrics and Child Health.

=== British Paediatric Association ===
Start date	End date	President	Notes
1926		George Frederic Still	first president of the BPA
1935		Albert Ernest Naish	
		James Holmes Hutchison	
1965		Richard Ellis	
1968	1969	Alfred White Franklin	
1973	1976	Donald Court	
		Otto Herbert Wolff	
1988	1991	June Lloyd	first female president of the BPA
1991	1994	David Hull	
1994	1996	Roy Meadow	Disgraced by his misuse of statistics

=== Royal College of Paediatrics and Child Health ===
Start date	End date	President	Notes
1996	1997	Roy Meadow	first president of the RCPCH
1997	1999	David Baum	died in office
1999	2003	David Hall	
2003	2006	Alan Craft	supported Roy Meadow
2006	2009	Patricia Hamilton	first female president of the RCPCH
2009	2012	Terence Stephenson	
2012	2015	Hilary Cass	
2015	2018	Neena Modi	
2018	2021	Russell Viner	
2021	2024	Camilla Kingdon	
2024	2027	Steve Turner	-
