= Frederick Miller (paediatrician) =

British paediatrician

Frederick "Fred" Miller
- Early image of Fred Miller
- Born: 5 November 1911; Newbiggin-by-the-Sea, Northumberland
- Died: 11 March 1996 (aged 84)
- Education: Durham University
- Known for: Definition of treatment of tuberculosis in childhood.
- Scientific career
- Fields: Pediatrics
- Workplaces: Great Ormond Street Hospital, Royal Brompton Hospital

Frederick John William Miller FRCP (born 5 November 1911 in Newbiggin-by-the-Sea, Northumberland, died 30 March 1996) was a British paediatrician, who made critically important contributions in describing tuberculosis in childhood, including the definition of the treatment and control, of the disease. Along with Sir James Spence and Sir Donald Court, Fred Miller were responsible for the formulation of the major epidemiological cohort study called the Newcastle Thousand Families Study. After that the group was called the Newcastle Trio in the medical community.

== Life ==
Frederick Miller was the son of a dentist, and undertook his early schooling at The King Edward VI School, Morpeth, where he excelled as both a sportsman and scholar. Miller started his medical training at Durham University Medical school, now the Newcastle University Medical School, where he first encountered and was heavily influenced by Sir James Spence During this period, Miller worked in a junior post as a house surgeon at Durham University, where he worked with George Grey Turner, considered the most capable surgeon of his day. Later junior appointments included a stint working as an assistant in general practice in Barton-upon-Humber, Miller became increasingly interested in disease of tuberculosis and was able to study the phenomena both at Great Ormond Street Hospital and the Royal Brompton Hospital, in London.

During his time in London, he met Sheila Franklin, later to become his wife.

== Career ==
Upon returning to Newcastle in 1939, Miller took the post of maternal and child health officer at the Maternity unit, under the supervision of Sir John Charles, who was the Medical Officer for Health for Newcastle. Miller was one of the earliest neonatologists, and at time when hospital services for the very young and prematurely born were poor. Through this work, Miller developed a home nursing service for preterm births that was one of the first in the UK. Working with Charles, Miller conducted research into the causes of infant mortality and morbidity, either at home or at hospital within the population of Newcastle, in those late interwar years. The research conducted by Miller and Charles undoubtedly shaped the thinking of Charles work, both in the formation of the National Health Service, and the later reorganisation and consolidation of clinical services that followed that period. With the outbreak of war seemingly becoming a reality, the effort was put on hold.

During World War II, Miller spent three years as a medical officer to a field ambulance unit, seeing service in Shetland, North Africa and later Italy. Expecting to move to the Far East with a new posting in 1945, Miller found he had been collected by Charles, who was now Chief Medical Officer for the Home Office, and found that he was needed for work in Newcastle.

Working with Sir James Spence and Sir Donald Court, Miller conducted research into the causes of infant mortality and morbidity, either at home or at hospital within the population of Newcastle. At the time, the infant death rate in the UK was 62 per 1000 births. In modern terms this equates to the infant death rate currently seen in the most deprived parts of Africa. Both the prewar work and the work in the first years after the war, showed how infection was related to the emergence of the relation between the impact of disease and social deprivation, and this led in May 1947, to the trio, led by Spence, starting the Thousand Families Study cohort study in Newcastle. John Forfar described it best, in presentation of the James Spence Medal in 1987 thus:

This was no short term study, but at the time, a unique long term study, published in three books of the pattern and incidence of childhood disease, particularly childhood infections in a total community. It was a study which brought together in a unified way many elements of the child health service, hospital paediatricians, child health doctors working in the community, nurses and health visitors. It was a lesson on how the child health services could be integrated, a lesson we have still not learned adequately today.

In 1948, when the National Health Service was created, Miller was appointed as a consultant to the Royal Victoria Infirmary and Newcastle General Hospital, a position he held until 1974, when he retired. In 1955, Miller was recognised for his work into childhood poverty and disease in the north east of England, but being appointed Reader in Social Paediatrics at the University of Durham, an appointment that remains unique to this day. In 1966, while working as a Consultant for the World Health Organisation (WHO), Miller was asked to spend nine months in India to research and report on the teaching of Child Health in that country. Miller would eventually travel to India every year until 1984, to continue the development of the project and measure ongoing progress in Child Health.

== Contributions ==
One of Miller's main contributions, was the study of Tuberculosis. When Miller started his paediatric career in 1934, tuberculosis was a major scourge of the childhood, particularly in the poor in the north of England. A child in Newcastle, indeed anywhere in the UK, who was diagnosed with TB faced a grim outlook. Millers working life covered a period of dramatic success, including discoveries, like the use of Streptomycin and changes to nutrition and general improvements to the health of the populace at large. Miller's achievements in this area were not inconsiderable, and by 1963, TB in children in Newcastle had become a rarity. Miller's research was written into a book that became the standard text on tuberculosis, described below. In the 1980s, with the re-emergence of the disease, the book was updated by Sir John Crofton and Norman Horne.

== Awards and honours ==
Douglas was awarded the prestigious James Spence Medal in 1987, by the Royal College of Paediatrics and Child Health.

== Bibliography ==
- Miller, Frederick John William (1982). Tuberculosis in children: evolution, epidemiology, treatment, prevention. Edinburgh: Churchill Livingstone. ISBN 0443015740.
- Miller, Frederick (1974). The School years in Newcastle-upon-Tyne, 1952-62: being a further contribution to the study of a thousand families. London; New York: Oxford University Press. ISBN 9780192649140.
- Clinical tuberculosis with John Crofton and Norman Horne., Paris:IUATLD, London:Macmillan 1995
