= Hugh Jackson (paediatrician) =

British paediatrician (1918–2013)

- Born: 9 May 1918
- Died: 5 October 2013 (aged 95)
- Education: Oxford University
- Known for: Campaign to introduce childproof packaging to medicine
- Awards: OBE, MC
- Scientific career
- Fields: Pediatrics
- Workplaces: Radcliffe Infirmary, Royal Victoria Infirmary, Fleming Memorial Hospital

Robert Hugh Jackson OBE MC (9 May 1918 – 5 October 2013) was a British paediatrician most notable for his campaign to introduce childproof packaging to medicine.

== Life ==
Hugh Jackson was born in Oldham, United Kingdom to a medical family. He finished school at Oundle and did his medical schooling at Oxford. He and another student restarted a boys' club for deprived youth while they were at Oxford. Normally Jackson would have done his clinical training in London but because of the beginning of World War II, he was part of the first group to be fast-tracked in clinical training at Oxford University. One of his teachers was Sir Howard Florey a pioneer who went on to win the Nobel Prize in Physiology or Medicine in 1945 along with Sir Ernst Boris Chain and Sir Alexander Fleming for his role in the making of penicillin. Jackson was fortunate to see some of the early successes with penicillin. He trained in the A&E department at Radcliffe Infirmary and also in Wingfield Orthopaedic Hospital where he met his future wife Shirley who was doing research in traumatic nerve damage.

He and Shirley were married in 1945. Dr. Jackson died 5 October 2013 at age 95, preceded in death by his wife Shirley and one of their three sons.

== Career ==
After his clinical training, he became a Medical Officer for an Infantry Battalion of the Royal West Kent Regiment in Italy. He was awarded the Military Cross for heroism in northern Italy in treating more than a dozen soldiers injured when a house was shelled and collapsed. His efforts in crawling through the debris with two orderlies to treat the injured during the 17-hour effort to rescue them promoted confidence among the soldiers and helped prevent additional deaths.

On his return to civilian life after the war, he began work under Sir James Spence, a pioneer in social paediatrics. In this process he set up a new paediatric units in North Shields and Gateshead. He followed these by speciality work in gastroenterology and nephrology at the Royal Victoria Infirmary in Newcastle.

He worked with Dr. Davison at the Fleming Memorial Hospital in Newcastle from 1957 to 1961 in providing critical care for infants and children. One of their efforts was to begin co-admission of mothers with their babies in special cubicles to allow the mothers to continue breast-feed and care for their babies.

In 1976, with Professor Donald Court, he persuaded the King’s Fund to provide start-up funding and office space to form the Child Accident Prevention Trust (CAPT).

He contributed a section on abdominal pain in pediatric emergencies to the 1978 book, Management of medical emergencies.

He was appointed OBE in 2000, and was awarded the James Spence Medal by the Royal College of Paediatrics and Child Health in recognition of his contribution to child health.
