= Muriel Morley =

English speech and language therapist

Muriel Elizabeth Morley OBE FRCSLT
- Born: 20 February 1899; Halifax, West Yorkshire, England
- Died: 15 September 1993 (aged 94); Alnwick, Northumberland.
- Occupation: Speech Therapist

Academic background
- Education: Durham University

Academic work
- Sub-discipline: Management of cleft palate Aphasia
- Institutions: Church High School; Royal Victoria Infirmary; Newcastle University

Muriel Elizabeth Morley OBE FRCSLT (1899–1993) was an English speech and language therapist who specialised in the management of cleft palate. She was the president of the Royal College of Speech and Language Therapists.

== Early years ==
Morley was born on 20 February 1899 in Halifax, Yorkshire. She was the eldest daughter of Samuel Edwin Morley and Helen Ann Monk (née Fletcher). Morley attended high schools in Halifax and Monkseaton and went on to read physics and biology at Armstrong College, a college of Durham University located in Newcastle upon Tyne. In 1920 she graduated with a BSc and a certificate of education. She taught physics at the Church High School in Newcastle for ten years before taking up a teaching post in India. Whilst working in India, Morley contracted dysentery and upon her return to England she was advised that she was no longer strong enough for work in the classroom.

== Speech and language therapy ==
In 1932, after working as a secretary due to her forced change of career, Morley responded to an advertisement placed by William Wardell, a plastic surgeon located in Newcastle upon Tyne. Wardell had developed a new type of pharyngoplasty for children with cleft palate and wanted an "educated woman" to assess the speech skills of the children before and after surgery, to help determine the effectiveness of the operation. Through this work, Morley began specialising as a speech therapist working with cleft palate patients. She subsequently trained formally as a speech therapist by working with colleagues in Liverpool and London in hospitals and school clinics. In 1938 she gained the diploma of the British Society of Speech Therapists.

Morley was appointed as a therapist at the Royal Victoria Infirmary in Newcastle upon Tyne. Whilst working for two sessions a week, she spent time preparing a thesis on cleft palate, which later became the basis for her book Cleft Palate and Speech, passed in April 1939. It is around this time that she also gained membership of the British Society of Speech Therapists; its members were admitted to the College of Speech Therapists founded in 1945.

Morley's book gave thorough descriptions of the anatomy of cleft palate, surgery, associated speech problems and practical suggestions for treatment. It became a source of standard work in this field when published in 1945.

Between 1940 and 1945 people were becoming increasingly aware of speech therapy and the profession gained more recognition. By 1945 Morley had set up Newcastle's hospital speech therapy service and was now working full-time as a therapist in three different hospitals. Her treatment covered a variety of speech, language and communication disorders including aphasic ex-servicemen suffering from head injuries sustained in World War II. As Morley's practice expanded, she was obliged to involve parents in the treatment of their child's speech and language disorder to manager her bulging caseload. However, soon she recognised the benefits of this and became an exponent of parental involvement in speech therapy.

== Research ==
One of her major studies, with colleagues in Child Health, Neurology and Statistics was conducted between 1950 and 1953. During this time, Morley's department researched into the normal and abnormal development of speech in a group of over 1000 children at ages 2,4,6 and 15 as part of the Newcastle Thousand Families survey. In 1957 she published part of this study together with examples of her work in multidisciplinary clinics as The Development and Disorders of Speech in Childhood. This work was regarded as a landmark in speech pathology in the United States of America. In 1958, on the basis of this book, Morley was awarded the degree of DSc by the University of Durham.

Morley made her first of several visits to the US in 1951 where she found the standard of clinical work was below that of the UK, but that academically the training was more extensive. Upon her return to the UK, Morley hoped that a university degree course might persuade more people into the profession. Eventually, she persuaded the university in Newcastle, still then part of the University of Durham, to investigate the possibility of setting up a degree. In 1959, Morley's idea was realised and she delayed her retirement in order to establish the course. She was appointed lecturer in speech and speech pathology in the departments of child health and education, founding head of what became the first department of Speech in Britain.

== Bill for Professions Supplementary to Medicine (1959) ==
Morley joined the ultimately successful campaign against registration under the Bill for Professions Supplementary to Medicine because she was convinced that the profession, in order to survive, must exist as a discipline completely separate from general medicine. A national referendum of speech therapists followed, the profession stood firm and, despite government anger, they were removed from the Bill. The Professions Supplementary to Medicine Bill was enacted in 1960.

== Retirement ==
Morley's contribution to the profession of speech therapy was considerable. She eventually retired from what was by then the University of Newcastle upon Tyne, however in retirement she became the founding editor of the College of Speech Therapists' journal from 1966 to 1971, then known as the British Journal of Disorders of Communication. Morley served as its third president from 1971–1973. Throughout her career, she forged strong links with speech therapy profession in the US, Australia and New Zealand where she travelled widely as a visiting professor. She was involved in achieving reciprocal recognition of speech therapy qualifications in the US and was made an honorary member of the American Cleft Palate Association and honorary fellow of the Australian College of Speech Therapists.

In the 1980 Birthday Honours, Morley was appointed an Officer of the Order of the British Empire (OBE) in acknowledgement of her pioneering work in research and education in speech therapy. Donald Court, professor of child health at Newcastle and her former colleague, described Morley in 1984 as a "remarkable woman", likening her to Cromwell's soldiers, "she knew what she fought for and loved what she knew".

During her retirement, Morley lived in Northumberland where she enjoyed the last thirty years of her life. The photography that she learned as part of her original cleft palate work remained a lifelong hobby. Morley never married but was described as being devoted to her family. She died of bronchopneumonia on 15 September 1993 in Alnwick, Northumberland.

== Publications ==
=== Books ===
- Morley, M (1945). Cleft palate and Speech. Edinburgh: C & D Livingstone (7th Edition 1970)
- Morley, M (1957). The Development and Disorders of Speech in Childhood. London: Churchill Livingstone. (3rd Edition 1972)

=== Papers ===
- Morley, M., Court, D and Miller, H (1950). Childhood speech disorders and the family doctor. British Medical Journal 1, 574–578
- Morley, M and Miller, H (1950). Discussion on speech defects in children. Proceedings of the Royal Society of Medicine 43, 579–588
- Morley, M., Court, D and Miller, H (1954). Developmental dysarthria. British Medical Journal 1, 8–14
- Morley, M., Court, D., Miller, H and Garside, R (1955). Delayed speech and developmental aphasia. British Medical Journal 2, 463–467
- Morley, M and Court, D (1958). Medicine and speech therapy. Lancet 1, 1169–1171
- Morley, M (1960). Developmental receptive-expressive aphasia. Speech Pathology and Therapy 3, 64.
- Morley, M (1973). Receptive/expressive developmental aphasia: a case study. British Journal of Disorders of Communication 8, 47–53.
