= Mateus de Assis Silva =

Brazilian para powerlifter (born 1997)

Personal information
- Born: May 25, 1997 (age 29) Uberlândia, Minas Gerais, Brazil

Sport
- Country: Brazil
- Sport: Para powerlifting
- Disability: Myelomeningocele
- Weight class: Up to 107 kg
Medal record
Representing Brazil
Men's para powerlifting
Parapan American Games
Silver medal – second place	2023 Santiago	107 kg
Bronze medal – third place	2017 Lima	107 kg
Junior World Championships
Silver medal – second place	2017 Mexico City	97 kg
Youth Parapan American Games
Gold medal – first place	2013 Buenos Aires	97 kg
Gold medal – first place	2017 Sao Paulo	97 kg

Mateus de Assis Silva (born 25 May 1997) is a Brazilian para powerlifter. He has impairments in his lower limbs due to myelomeningocele. He represented Brazil at the 2024 Summer Paralympics. He has won a silver and a bronze at the Parapan American Games and two golds at the Youth Parapan American Games.

== Early and personal life ==
Mateus de Assis Silva was born on 25 May 1997 in Uberlândia, Minas Gerais. He has impairments in his lower limbs as a result of myelomeningocele.

Prior to taking up powerlifting, Silva participated in swimming on a recreational basis. In 2012, a physical education teacher introduced him to the Núcleo de Paradesporto in Uberlândia, where he was encouraged to try para powerlifting. Silva identifies as LGBTQ.

== Career ==
Silva began representing Brazil in international para powerlifting competitions in 2013. He won a gold medal in the Youth Parapan American Games held at Buenos Aires, and a bronze medal in the South American Para Games in Santiago. He competed at the 2015 Parapan American Games in Toronto, where he finished fourth in his weight category. He won gold at the 2017 Youth Parapan American Games in São Paulo and claimed a silver medal at the 2017 Junior World Championships in Mexico City. During the same year, he made his senior World Championships debut and finished ninth in the men's up to 97 kg event.

In 2018, Silva won the gold medal in the up to 107 kg category at the Regional Norte-Nordeste stage of the Circuito Loterias Caixa and improved his personal best lift to 195 kg. He later attempted 207 kg, which would have surpassed the Brazilian adult record, but was unsuccessful.

At the 2019 Parapan American Games in Lima, Silva won the bronze medal in the men's up to 107 kg event. He later represented Brazil at the 2019 World Para Powerlifting Championships in Nur-Sultan, finishing tenth in his category. In 2023, he won the silver medal in the men's up to 107 kg event at the 2023 Parapan American Games in Santiago. He represented Brazil at the 2024 Summer Paralympics in Paris. Competing in the men's up to 107 kg event, he lifted 212 kg and finished fifth in the final.
