= Leonard Fenwick =

British health administrator

Sir Leonard Raymond Fenwick, CBE (born 10 August 1947) is an English hospital executive, who until August 2017 was the Chief Executive of Newcastle upon Tyne Hospitals NHS Foundation Trust, from where he was sacked after being found guilty of Gross Misconduct.

== Career ==
Born and raised West Jesmond, Newcastle upon Tyne, he joined the NHS aged 18 as a management trainee at the Royal Victoria Infirmary in 1965. Aged 20 he was appointed an administrative officer at the then new Hull Royal Infirmary. In the 1970s he returned to Newcastle as part of the team involved in the planning and design of the dental hospital and associated dental school.

Fenwick was then appointed commissioning manager for the former Freeman Road Hospital, before being promoted senior management lead, and in 1977 was appointed as Unit Administrator. He was then appointed General Manager of the Freeman Hospital, becoming Chief Executive when it became an NHS Trust in 1992. In 1998 he became the Chief Executive of Newcastle upon Tyne Hospitals NHS Foundation Trust (NUTH).

In April 2011, he was named as the 11th highest paid employee (£232,500) in the English NHS. In 2015 the Health Service Journal judged him as the fifth to top Chief Executive in the National Health Service. According to The Guardian newspaper, he was one of a number of NHS Chief Executives who publicly supported government imposition of the new junior doctors contract.

=== Dismissal ===
On 12 January 2017 the Board of NUTH announced that Sir Leonard had been placed on extended leave. A disciplinary panel was then convened, after an investigation was carried out into claims of bullying and abusive behaviour. It was claimed that Fenwick had tried to force the resignations of two consultants, who were caught having sex with junior members of staff on hospital premises. The dismissals were stopped by the Trust's chair, Kingsley Smith, and non-executive director Bryan Dodson, and after a subsequent 20 minute hearing the two consultants were advised that they could keep their jobs. However, during the investigation allegations and issues were raised against Fenwick by different sources, which resulted in the Board commissioning an investigation and report by an outside HR specialist. This report led to a two-day disciplinary hearing, which found "allegations relating to inappropriate behaviour, use of resources and a range of governance issues, which were proven." Fenwick appealed against the decision, but a second independent panel again found the allegations proven, and resultantly Fenwick was dismissed on grounds of Gross Misconduct.

NUTH added that "Due to the serious nature of the issues the Trust was required to report a number of concerns to NHS Counter Fraud and Security Management Services, known as NHS Protect. As a result it would be inappropriate for the Trust to make any further comment on this matter."
