= Kaylee Davidson-Olley =

- Born: 1987 (age 38–39)
- Known for: Europe's longest surviving child heart transplant recipient; Campaigner for the organ donor register

Kaylee Davidson-Olley (born 1987) was the United Kingdom's first successful heart transplant baby when she received a replacement heart at less than one year of age. In 2017 she celebrated her 30th year after the transplant operation; it was her 30th year as the longest surviving heart transplant baby in Europe. The operation was performed by cardiothoracic surgeon, Christopher McGregor at the Freeman Hospital, Newcastle, which became one of only two UK centres performing transplants in children, and the main hospital in the UK carrying out transplants for adults born with congenital heart disease.

She went on to become an advocate of the organ donor register and in 2013 won the gold medal for the 4 × 100 metres relay race at the World Transplant Games.

== Early life ==
Kaylee Davidson-Olley was born in 1987. She was raised in Houghton-le-Spring, County Durham. Her mother is Carol Olley.

As an infant, she was diagnosed with a cardiomyopathy and for six weeks prior to her heart transplant, was severely ill in the Freeman Hospital's intensive care unit.

== Heart transplantation ==
Davidson-Olley's heart transplantation was performed on 14 October 1987 by surgeon Christopher McGregor at the Freeman Hospital, Newcastle, when Davidson-Olley was either four or five months old. McGregor had previously transplanted a heart into an adult woman in May 1985, the recipient surviving for 25 years.

Ten days after the transplant operation, the media were allowed admission to the intensive care unit where Davidson-Olley was a patient. Subsequently, the Freeman Hospital became one of only two centres in Britain performing transplants on children, and the main hospital in Britain carrying out transplants for adults born with congenital heart disease.

== Advocacy ==
Davidson-Olley has campaigned on behalf of the organ donor register, saying in her 25th year of survival that she was only alive "because of the generosity of a family who made that important decision about organ donation, a decision that saved my life".

In 2013, at the World Transplant Games in Durban, South Africa, Davidson-Olley ran the 4 × 100 metres relay and won the gold medal.

In 2017, Davidson-Olley observed the 30th anniversary of the heart transplant procedure and her 30th year as the longest surviving heart transplant baby in Europe. To celebrate, she and the staff from the Freeman Hospital, members of families of people who have had transplants, the president of the World Transplant Games Federation and her surgeon, took the "Walk for Life", starting at Baltic Square, stopping at the Copthorne Hotel and then making their way across Newcastle's Millennium Bridge. McGregor stated that he had "followed Kaylee's progress and achievements over the last 30 years" and was "delighted to walk with Kaylee and share her special day and the success of the paediatric heart and lung transplant programme".

In May 2019, Davidson-Olley was named as one of four local heroes that had their name cast in a bronze plaque, to be placed permanently by the River Tyne. The following year, she appealed for the public to adhere to social distancing rules during the first COVID-19 lockdown in the UK.
