= David Morley (paediatrician) =

British paediatrician

David Cornelius Morley
- David Morley
- Born: 15 May 1923; Rothwell, Northamptonshire, UK
- Died: 2 July 2009 (aged 86); Weymouth, Dorset, UK
- Education: Clare College, Cambridge, St Thomas's Hospital
- Known for: Championing child health in developing countries
- Awards: King Faisal International Prize, CBE, Dawson Williams Memorial Prize, James Spence medal, Maurice Pate Leadership for Children award
- Scientific career
- Fields: Medicine, Pediatrics
- Notable students: Natividad Relucio-Clavano

David Cornelius Morley CBE FRCP (15 June 1923 – 2 July 2009) was a British paediatrician and emeritus Professor of Child Health, UCL Institute of Child Health who saved the lives of many thousands of children in developing countries.

== Early life ==
David Cornelius Morley was born on 15 June 1923 in Rothwell, Northamptonshire in the UK. He was the youngest of seven children born to a vicar and his wife. He attended school at Haywards Heath and then Marlborough College.

Morley read Natural Sciences at Clare College, Cambridge and completed his undergraduate education at St Thomas's Hospital, from where he qualified in medicine in 1947. He then undertook military service in Singapore (now Malaysia).

== Professional career ==
In 1951 Morley took a junior hospital post in Sunderland, and then in 1953 moved to Newcastle where he worked with James Spence and Donald Court.

Then in 1956 Morley moved to Ilesha, Nigeria, where he took up a research post at a Methodist hospital (the Wesley Guild Hospital) and first became interested in measles and growth monitoring. In 1973 he wrote of Nigeria "Three-quarters of our population are rural, yet three-quarters of our medical resources are spent in the towns where three-quarters of our doctors live; three-quarters of the people die from diseases which could be prevented at low cost, and yet three-quarters of medical budgets are spent on curative services." He found that low-cost healthcare initiatives within the community were more effective in treating infant mortality than hospital treatment, work that has influenced governments and agencies globally.

In 1961, Morley returned to the UK and took up a post at the London School of Hygiene & Tropical Medicine, and then in 1964 moved to the Institute of Child Health where he set up the Tropical Child Health Unit (now the UCL Institute for Global Health), the World Health Organization/UNICEF course for senior teachers of child health, and diploma and masters' courses in mother and child health and disability studies.

== Innovations ==
Morley developed, or was instrumental in the development of, many innovations and technologies in child healthcare. A double-ended plastic spoon allowed mothers to accurately measure the correct proportions of salt and sugar to treat dehydration successfully using oral rehydration therapy.

While working in Nigeria he developed the "Road to health" chart, a parent-held growth chart for monitoring a child's weight to detect early signs of malnutrition. The concept of parent-held growth charts has now been copied globally. Facing the problem that innumerate mothers could not write down the weights of their children, he devised a mechanism attached to scales that could mark the weight directly onto a chart.

Morley started the earliest trials of the measles vaccine, in which he included his own children. He also devised an asthma inhaler made from old plastic drink bottles, and a simple Mid-upper arm circumference (MUAC) measuring tape for detecting severe malnutrition. Another of his innovations was sterilising water by placing it in sunlight. He instigated a series of trachoma reduction programmes in partnership with ICROSS (International Community for the Relief of Starvation), developing a fly trap to reduce the primary cause of trachoma transmission.

Morley also identified the need for a low-cost device to measure a baby's temperature, and asked John Zeal to create one. The result was the ThermoSpot, a small disc that shows a green smiley face when the temperature is in the correct range.

== Charity Work ==
In 1965 he established the charity Teaching-aids at Low Cost (TALC), a charity formed to provide healthcare books and other materials cheaply to healthcare workers and others in developing countries. TALC has sent over half a million books and other items overseas. He was closely involved with innovative research together with Dr Michael Elmore-Meegan of ICROSS with whom he published a series of studies.

Then in 1978, with Hugh Hawes, he started Child-to-Child, an international network promoting children's participation in their own health and development, now the Child to Child Trust. He continued supporting ICROSS in Kenya and Tanzania until his death.

== Honours ==
Morley was awarded UNICEF'S Maurice Pate Leadership for Children Award in 1974, and in 1982 the King Faisal International Prize for exceptional achievements in medicine.

In 1986 he was awarded an honorary doctorate from the Faculty of Medicine at Uppsala University, Sweden and the James Spence Medal of the British Paediatric Association (now Royal College of Paediatrics and Child Health) in 1987. He was awarded the British Medical Association's Dawson Williams Memorial Prize.

In 1989 Morley was awarded with a CBE.

== Publications ==
- Morley, David (1960). "Cold Injury among children severely ill in the Tropics". The Lancet. 276 (7161): 1170–1171. doi:10.1016/S0140-6736(60)92358-8. PMID 13772717.
- Morley, David; Knox, George (December 1960). "The Birth Weights of Yoruba Babies". BJOG: An International Journal of Obstetrics & Gynaecology. 67 (6): 975–980. doi:10.1111/j.1471-0528.1960.tb09254.x. PMID 13772715. S2CID 28871914.
- Knox, George; Morley, David (December 1960). "Twinning in Yoruba Women". BJOG: An International Journal of Obstetrics & Gynaecology. 67 (6): 981–984. doi:10.1111/j.1471-0528.1960.tb09255.x. PMID 13757217. S2CID 28909380.
- Morley, David (March 1963). "A medical service for children under five years of age in West Africa". Trans R Soc Trop Med Hyg. 57 (2): 79–88. doi:10.1016/0035-9203(63)90019-1.
- Morley, David (14 March 1964). "Controlled Trial of Pyrimethamine in Pregnant Women in an African Village". Br Med J. 1 (5384): 667–668. doi:10.1136/bmj.1.5384.667. PMC 1813732. PMID 14096460.
- Morley, David (1968). "Factors influencing the growth and nutritional status of infants and young children in a Nigerian village". Trans R Soc Trop Med Hyg. 62 (2): 164–195. doi:10.1016/0035-9203(68)90155-7. PMID 5643167.
- Morley, David (1 February 1969). "Severe Measles in the Tropics". Br Med J. 1 (5639): 297–300. doi:10.1136/bmj.1.5639.297. PMC 1982195. PMID 5762650.
- Morley, David (1969). The care of babies and young children in the tropics. London: National Association for Maternal and Child Welfare. ISBN 978-0902057005.
- Morley, David (1973). Paediatric Priorities in the Developing World. London: Butterworths. ISBN 978-0407351110.
- Morley, D; Woodland, Margaret (1979). See How They Grow: Monitoring Child Growth for Appropriate Health Care in Developing Countries. London and Basingstoke: Macmillan. ISBN 978-0195201604.
- Morley, David; Lovel, Hermione (1986). My Name is Today. Macmillan Education. ISBN 978-0333433010.
- Morley, David (1986). "Training in Child Health for the Developing World". Postgrad Med J. 62 (724): 147–149. doi:10.1136/pgmj.62.724.147. PMC 2418593. PMID 2432591.
- Morley, D; Meegan, Mike; Brown, R (1994). "Child weighing by the unschooled: a report of a controlled trial of growth monitoring over 12 months of Maasai children using direct recording scales". Trans R Soc Trop Med Hyg. 88 (6): 635–637. doi:10.1016/0035-9203(94)90202-X. PMID 7886753.
- Morley, D; Meegan, Mike (1999). "Growth Monitoring; Family participation: Effective Community Development". Trop Doct. 29 (3): 23–27. doi:10.1177/004947559902900109. PMID 10418276. S2CID 11411017.
- Morley, D; Kennedy, N (2002). "Hypothermia: Prevention at community level". Trop Doct. 32 (1): 23–24. doi:10.1177/004947550203200111. PMID 11991019. S2CID 5460697.
- Morley, David; Bell, Emily; Bell, Henry; Socrates, Cecile; Barsby, Kate; Boon, Gerald (2002). "A Low Cost Thermochromatic Thermometer to replace Glass and Mercury Thermometers". Trop Doct. 32 (3): 168–171. doi:10.1177/004947550203200319. PMID 12139163. S2CID 39879302.
- Morley, D (2003). "The emperor's clothes". Journal of Family and Community Medicine. 10 (3): 39–40. doi:10.4103/2230-8229.97831. PMC 3425751. PMID 23012036.
