= Sophie Hambleton =

British physician

- Born: London, England
- Education: University of Oxford
- Spouse: Andrew Trevelyan
- Scientific career
- Workplaces: Great North Children's Hospital; Newcastle University

Sophie Hambleton is a British physician who is Professor of Paediatrics and Immunology at Newcastle University. She is a clinical paediatric immunologist at the Great North Children's Hospital, which specialises in treating children with immunodeficiencies. Hambleton looks to understand the cellular and molecular basis of immune system errors. She was elected a Fellow of the Academy of Medical Sciences in 2020.

== Early life and education ==
Hambleton grew up in North West England. She studied medicine at Oxford, before training in paediatric immunology and laboratory science in the United Kingdom and United States. She was made a Consultant in Paediatric Immunology at Great North Children's Hospital in 2008.

== Research and career ==
Hambleton is a clinical physician who cares for children with inherited immunodeficiencies, many of which can be cured through bone marrow transplants. Her studies of immunodeficiency use DNA sequencing methods to better understand the human immune system, identify any erroneous genes and provide genetic therapies or inform patient care. Young people who suffer from severe infections can suffer from weakened immune systems due to errors in their genes. It can cause chronic infections and lung damage, as well as stunting children's growth, triggering autoimmune disease and blood cancers. Hambleton has focussed on susceptibility to intracellular pathogens, and uncovered that defective type I interferon signalling can cause viral susceptibility, complex autoimmunity and immunodeficiency. Hambleton leads the Genomics England Clinical Interpretation Partnership.

In 2020 Hambleton was elected Fellow of the Academy of Medical Sciences.

== Personal life ==
Hambleton has two children, both of whom attended Royal Grammar School.

== Selected publications ==
- A Lalvani; R Brookes; S Hambleton; W J Britton; A V Hill; A J McMichael (1 September 1997). "Rapid effector function in CD8+ memory T cells". Journal of Experimental Medicine. 186 (6): 859–865. doi:10.1084/jem.186.6.859. ISSN 0022-1007. PMC 2199056. PMID 9294140. Wikidata Q41847748.
- Qing Zhou; Dan Yang; Amanda K Ombrello; et al. (19 February 2014). "Early-onset stroke and vasculopathy associated with mutations in ADA2". The New England Journal of Medicine. 370 (10): 911–920. doi:10.1056/nejmoa1307361. ISSN 0028-4793. PMC 4193683. PMID 24552284. Wikidata Q30410263.
- Vincent Plagnol; James Curtis; Michael Epstein; et al. (31 August 2012). "A robust model for read count data in exome sequencing experiments and implications for copy number variant calling". Bioinformatics. 28 (21): 2747–2754. doi:10.1093/bioinformatics/bts526. ISSN 1367-4803. PMC 3476336. PMID 22942019. Wikidata Q30560796.
