= 2015 Summer Transplant Games =

XX World Transplant Games
- Host city: Mar del Plata
- Country: Argentina
- Nations: 44
- Athletes: 1,100
- Events: 14 sports
- Opening: August 23, 2015
- Closing: August 30, 2015
- Opened by: Olivier Coustere, presidente de la World Transplant Games Federation (WTGF)
- Main venue: Polideportivo Islas Malvinas

The 2015 Transplant Games (Spanish: Juegos Mundiales para Transplantados) were a multi-sport event held from 23 to 30 August 2015 in Mar del Plata, Argentina. They were the 20th edition of the World Transplant Games.

The Games were organized by the World Transplant Games Federation (WTGF), the Ministry of Social Development and the Ministry of Health of Argentina.

== Participating nations ==
- Argentina
- Australia
- Austria
- Brazil
- Belgium
- Bulgaria
- Canada
- Colombia
- Chile
- China
- Cyprus
- Czech Republic
- Finland
- France
- Germany
- Great Britain
- Greece
- Hong Kong
- Hungary
- Iceland
- India
- Iran
- Ireland
- Italy
- Japan
- Malaysia
- Mexico
- Nepal
- Netherlands
- New Zealand
- Norway
- Poland
- Portugal
- Singapore
- Slovakia
- South Africa
- South Korea
- Spain
- Sweden
- Switzerland
- Thailand
- Tunisia
- United States
- Uruguay

== Sports ==
- Athletics
- Table tennis
- Swimming
- Volleyball
- Triathlon
- Badminton
- Bowling
- Golf
- Squash
- Tennis
- Cycling
- Tejo
- Marathon (5 km)
- Pétanque

== Medal table ==
Medals were awarded to the following countries:

Rank	Nation	Gold	Silver	Bronze	Total
1	Great Britain	122	76	48	246
2	Argentina	54	44	46	144
3	South Africa	41	24	24	89
4	Hungary	41	23	23	87
5	United States	30	31	26	87
6	Iran	27	22	28	77
7	Germany	26	24	12	62
8	France	24	23	28	75
9	Thailand	18	27	18	63
10	Canada	13	14	11	38
11	Switzerland	9	12	5	26
12	Netherlands	8	22	19	49
13	Australia	8	6	10	24
14	Czech Republic	7	4	4	15
15	Ireland	7	4	1	12
16	Finland	5	7	10	22
17	Greece	4	5	4	13
18	Hong Kong	4	1	12	17
19	Tunisia	4	1	0	5
20	Italy	3	4	5	12
21	Austria	3	2	6	11
22	Belgium	3	2	1	6
23	Chile	3	1	2	6
23	New Zealand	3	1	2	6
25	China	3	0	1	4
26	Poland	2	4	4	10
27	Singapore	2	3	11	16
28	Portugal	2	2	0	4
29	Cyprus	2	0	1	3
30	Mexico	1	3	3	7
31	Brazil	1	2	2	5
31	Slovakia	1	2	2	5
33	Japan	1	1	3	5
34	India	1	1	1	3
35	Norway	0	1	3	4
36	Sweden	0	1	0	1
37	Spain	0	0	4	4
38	South Korea	0	0	1	1
39	Bulgaria	0	0	0	0
39	Colombia	0	0	0	0
39	Iceland	0	0	0	0
39	Malaysia	0	0	0	0
39	Nepal	0	0	0	0
39	Uruguay	0	0	0	0
Totals (44 entries)		483	400	381	1,264

== See also ==
- 2013 Youth Parapan American Games
