= Relucio =

Relucio is a Spanish surname. Notable people with the surname include:

- Charmaine Clarice Relucio Pempengco (born 1992), Filipino singer and television personality
- José María Relucio Gallego (born 1998), Spanish footballer
- José Vaquerizo Relucio (born 1978), Spanish boccia player
- Natividad Relucio-Clavano (1932–2007), Filipina pediatrician
