= 2017 Summer Transplant Games =

Multi-sport event

XXI World Transplant Games
- Host city: Málaga
- Country: Spain
- Nations: 52
- Events: 17 sports
- Opening: June 25, 2017
- Closing: July 2, 2017

The 2017 Transplant Games (Spanish: Juegos Mundiales para Transplantados) were a multi-sport event held from 25 June to 2 July 2017 in Málaga, Spain. They were the 21st edition of the World Transplant Games.

The Games were organized by the World Transplant Games Federation (WTGF).

== Participating nations ==
- Algeria
- Argentina
- Australia
- Austria
- Brazil
- Belgium
- Canada
- Colombia
- Chile
- China
- Cyprus
- Czech Republic
- Denmark
- Finland
- France
- Germany
- Great Britain
- Greece
- Hong Kong
- Hungary
- Iceland
- India
- Iran
- Ireland
- Israel
- Italy
- Japan
- Kazakhstan
- Lebanon
- Mexico
- Morocco
- Netherlands
- New Zealand
- Norway
- Paraguay
- Poland
- Portugal
- Puerto Rico
- Romania
- Russia
- Singapore
- Slovakia
- South Africa
- South Korea
- Spain
- Sweden
- Switzerland
- Thailand
- Tunisia
- Turkey
- United States
- Uruguay

== Sports ==
=== Individual sports ===
- Athletics
- Road race (5 km)
- Badminton
- Bowling
- Cycling
- Darts
- Golf
- Kayak
- Swimming
- Paddle tennis
- Pétanque
- Squash
- Table tennis
- Tennis
- Triathlon

=== Team sports ===
- Basketball (3 on 3)
- Volleyball

== Medal table ==
Medals were awarded to the following countries:

* Host nation (Spain)

Rank	Nation	Gold	Silver	Bronze	Total
1	Great Britain	166	90	104	360
2	United States	45	52	47	144
3	South Africa	35	23	18	76
4	Germany	30	30	22	82
5	Spain	29	15	14	58
6	Australia	27	28	18	73
7	Canada	19	15	21	55
8	France	19	11	27	57
9	Hungary	18	23	35	76
10	Argentina	17	23	24	64
11	Iran	17	18	14	49
12	Thailand	17	13	22	52
13	Ireland	12	7	9	28
14	Finland	10	15	11	36
15	Italy	9	10	14	33
16	New Zealand	9	6	5	20
17	Netherlands	8	14	17	39
18	Hong Kong	8	2	6	16
19	Switzerland	7	8	4	19
20	Poland	6	16	10	32
21	Greece	6	5	3	14
22	Japan	6	3	6	15
23	China	4	8	6	18
24	Brazil	3	5	1	9
25	Czech Republic	2	4	5	11
26	Austria	2	2	5	9
26	Mexico	2	2	5	9
28	Cyprus	2	2	1	5
28	Sweden	2	2	1	5
30	Tunisia	2	1	2	5
31	Norway	1	4	1	6
32	Portugal	1	3	2	6
33	Chile	1	1	4	6
34	Israel	1	1	2	4
35	India	1	0	1	2
36	Iceland	1	0	0	1
36	Kazakhstan	1	0	0	1
36	Morocco	1	0	0	1
36	Paraguay	1	0	0	1
36	South Korea	1	0	0	1
41	Singapore	0	4	6	10
42	Colombia	0	1	4	5
43	Belgium	0	1	3	4
44	Denmark	0	1	0	1
44	Puerto Rico	0	1	0	1
46	Slovakia	0	0	4	4
47	Romania	0	0	1	1
47	Uruguay	0	0	1	1
49	Algeria	0	0	0	0
49	Lebanon	0	0	0	0
49	Russia	0	0	0	0
49	Turkey	0	0	0	0
Totals (52 entries)		549	470	506	1,525
