= Lyn Lepore =

Australian Paralympic cyclist (1961–2025)

Lyn Lepore OAM
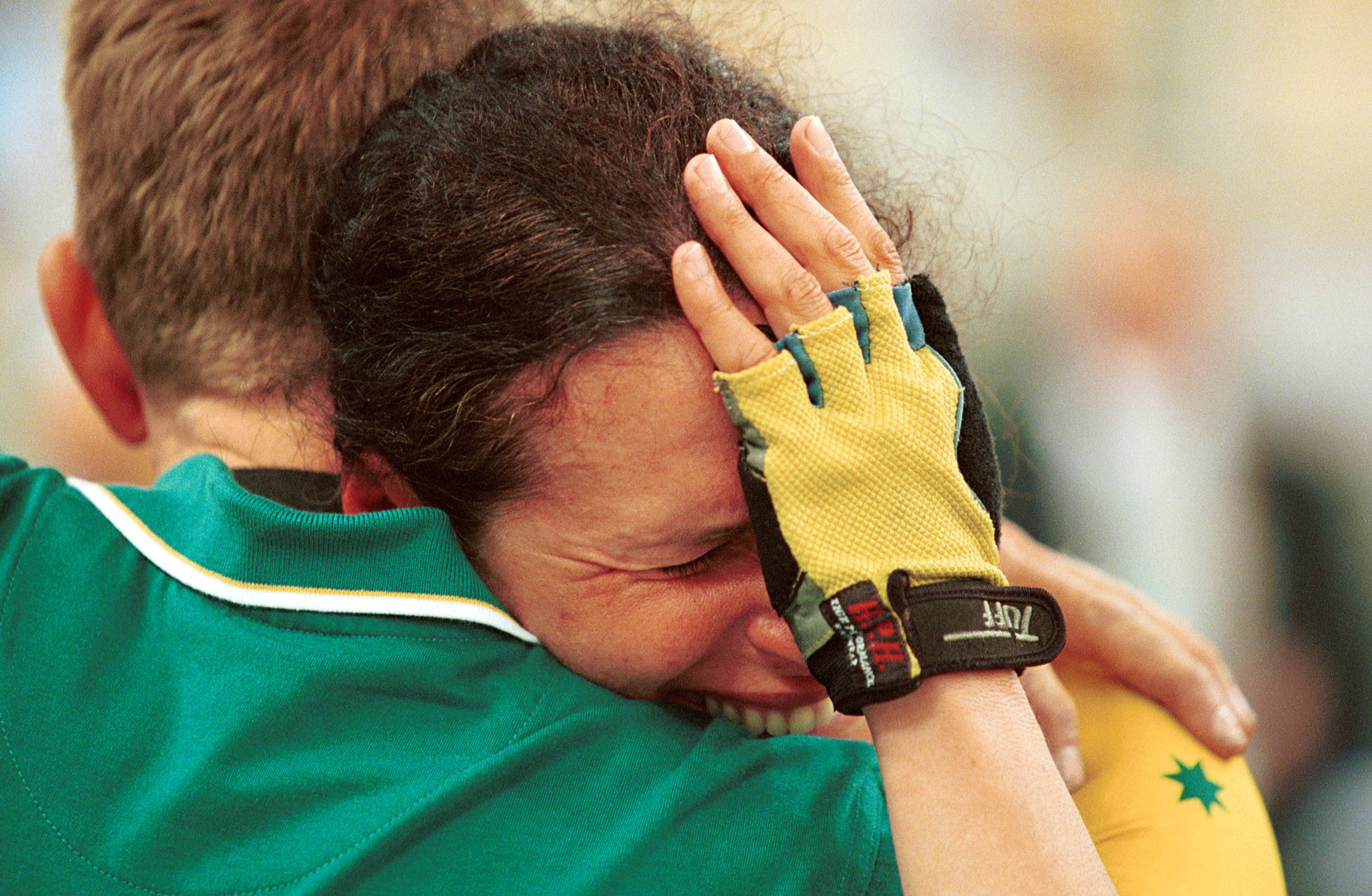
- Lepore at the 2000 Summer Paralympics

Personal information
- Full name: Lynette Lepore
- Nationality: Australia
- Born: 9 October 1961 Geraldton, Western Australia
- Died: 8 January 2025 (aged 63) Perth, Western Australia
Medal record
Women's cycling
Representing Australia
Paralympic Games
Gold medal – first place	2000 Sydney	Tandem open
Silver medal – second place	2000 Sydney	1 km Time Trial Tandem open
Bronze medal – third place	2000 Sydney	Individual Pursuit Tandem open
IPC Track and Road World Championships
Gold medal – first place	1994 Hasselt	Mixed Pursuit B & VI

Lynette Lepore, OAM (9 October 1961 – 8 January 2025) was an Australian Paralympic tandem cyclist who won three medals at the 2000 Sydney Paralympics including a gold medal.

== Paralympic Games ==
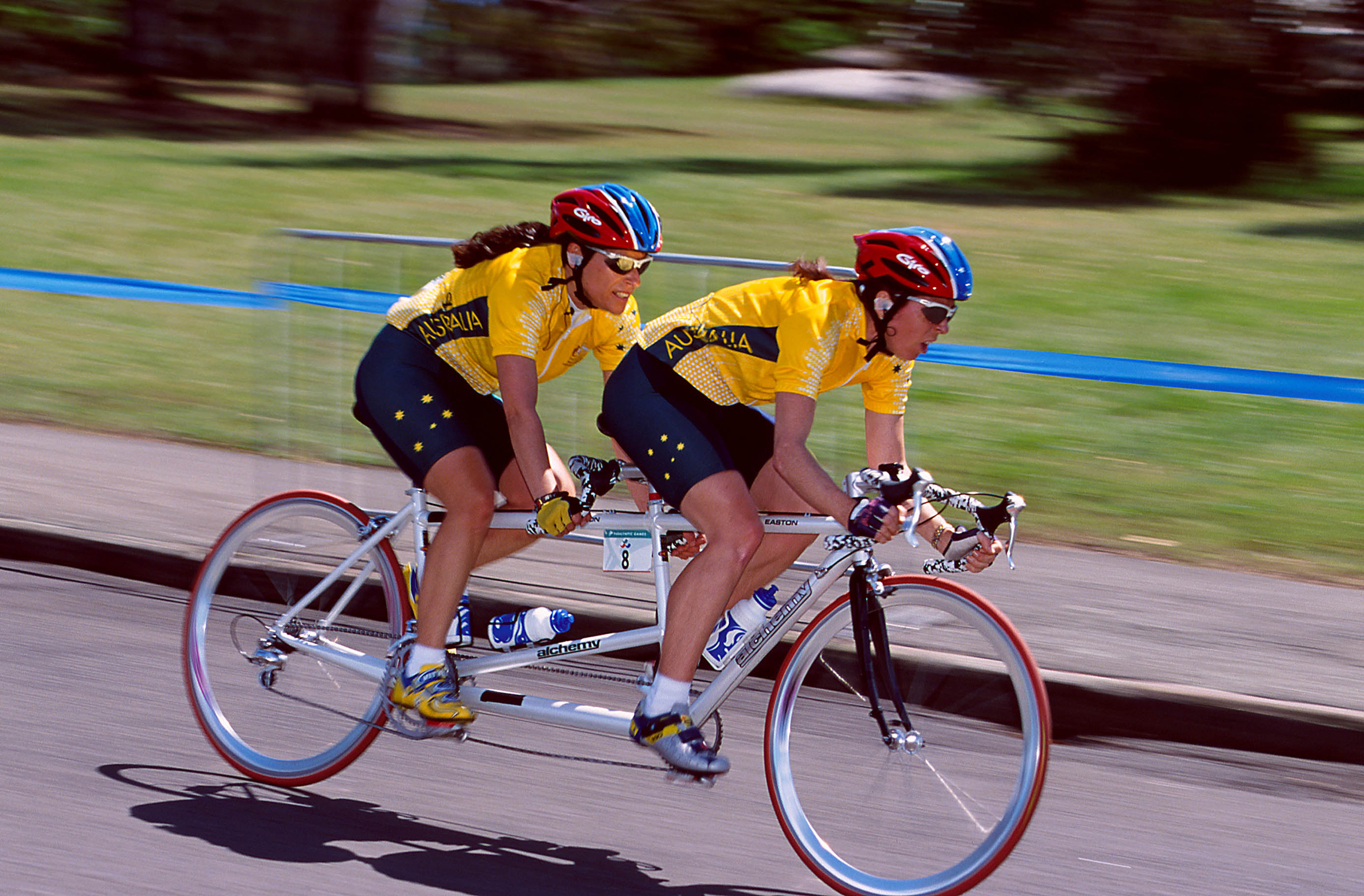
Lepore (left) with Lynette Nixon during the 2000 Summer Paralympics Women's Tandem Open road race

In 1994, Lepore competed at the IPC World Cycling Championships in Belgium with her tandem partner Tim Harris and they won the Mixed Individual 3000 m Track Pursuit. She competed at the 1996 Atlanta Games with her partner Paul Lamond but did not win any medals at those games. In 1998, with Paul Lamond she competed at the World Disabled Cycling Championships in Colorado Springs in track and road events but they did not medal.

At the 2000 Sydney Games, she won a gold medal in the Women's Tandem open event for which she received a Medal of the Order of Australia, a silver medal in the Women's 1 km Time Trial Tandem open event and a bronze medal in the Women's Individual Pursuit Open event, with her pilot Lynette Nixon. In 2000, she received an Australian Sports Medal.

Lepore appealed against Kieran Modra's placement in the Australian Paralympic cycling team at the 2004 Athens Games, in a case that was successful at the Court of Arbitration for Sport. Leading up to the games, Modra was piloted by David Short and Robert Crowe for sprint and endurance events, respectively. The appeal was on the grounds that Lepore deserved her place in the team because when each of Modra's pilot–rider combinations was counted separately, she had a higher rank than Modra. The day before the opening ceremony, the Australian Paralympic Committee successfully appealed to the International Paralympic Committee to give Modra an extra place in the team. Lepore did not win any medals with her tandem pilot Jenny Macpherson at the 2004 Games due to a crash on their opening event leaving them both injured.

== Transplant Games ==
In 2018, Lepore competed in the Australian Transplant Games on the Gold Coast, Queensland. In 2019, she competed in that year's World Transplant Games in Newcastle upon Tyne, England.In 2023, at the age of 61, she competed in three sporting events at the World Transplant Games in Perth, Western Australia and won a silver medal in her division in tenpin bowling.

== Personal life ==
Lepore was born on 9 October 1961 in Geraldton, Western Australia. She and her two sisters were born with inherited retinal dystrophy, which involves having tunnel vision, night blindness and kidney disease.In 1997, she was diagnosed with kidney disease and managed the condition for 18 years before she was forced onto dialysis. Her nephew Adam Reeves donated one of his kidneys to her in 2016.

She trained and worked as a remedial massage therapist. In 2016, Lepore graduated from Edith Cowan University with a Bachelor of Exercise and Sports Science (Honours). She was married to Paul Lamond.

Lepore was diagnosed with cancer in September 2024, and died at Glengarry Hospice, Perth, Western Australia on 8 January 2025, at the age of 63.
