= Newcastle upon Tyne Hospitals NHS Foundation Trust =

Healthcare trust in England

- Type: NHS hospital trust
- Hospitals: Royal Victoria Infirmary; Freeman Hospital; Great North Children's Hospital
- Chair: Paul Ennals
- Chief executive: Jim Mackey
- Staff: 15,000
- Website: www.newcastle-hospitals.org.uk

Newcastle upon Tyne Hospitals NHS Foundation Trust is one of the Shelford Group of University Teaching Hospitals and an NHS Foundation Trust. It provides acute medical services in Newcastle upon Tyne, England, at Royal Victoria Infirmary and Freeman Hospital, the Campus for Ageing and Vitality (the former Newcastle General Hospital site), Newcastle Dental Hospital, Newcastle Fertility Centre and the Northern Genetics Service. The Great North Children's Hospital also is part of the trust and is located linked with RVI on the same site.

The Private Finance Initiative scheme at the trust is a 38-year deal with Healthcare Support (Newcastle) Ltd, a special purpose vehicle formed in 2005 involving the Commonwealth Bank, Equion and Laing O'Rourke, Interserve and Innisfree Ltd. In 2014, there was a dispute between the trust and Laing O'Rourke over two clinical office buildings.

== Performance ==
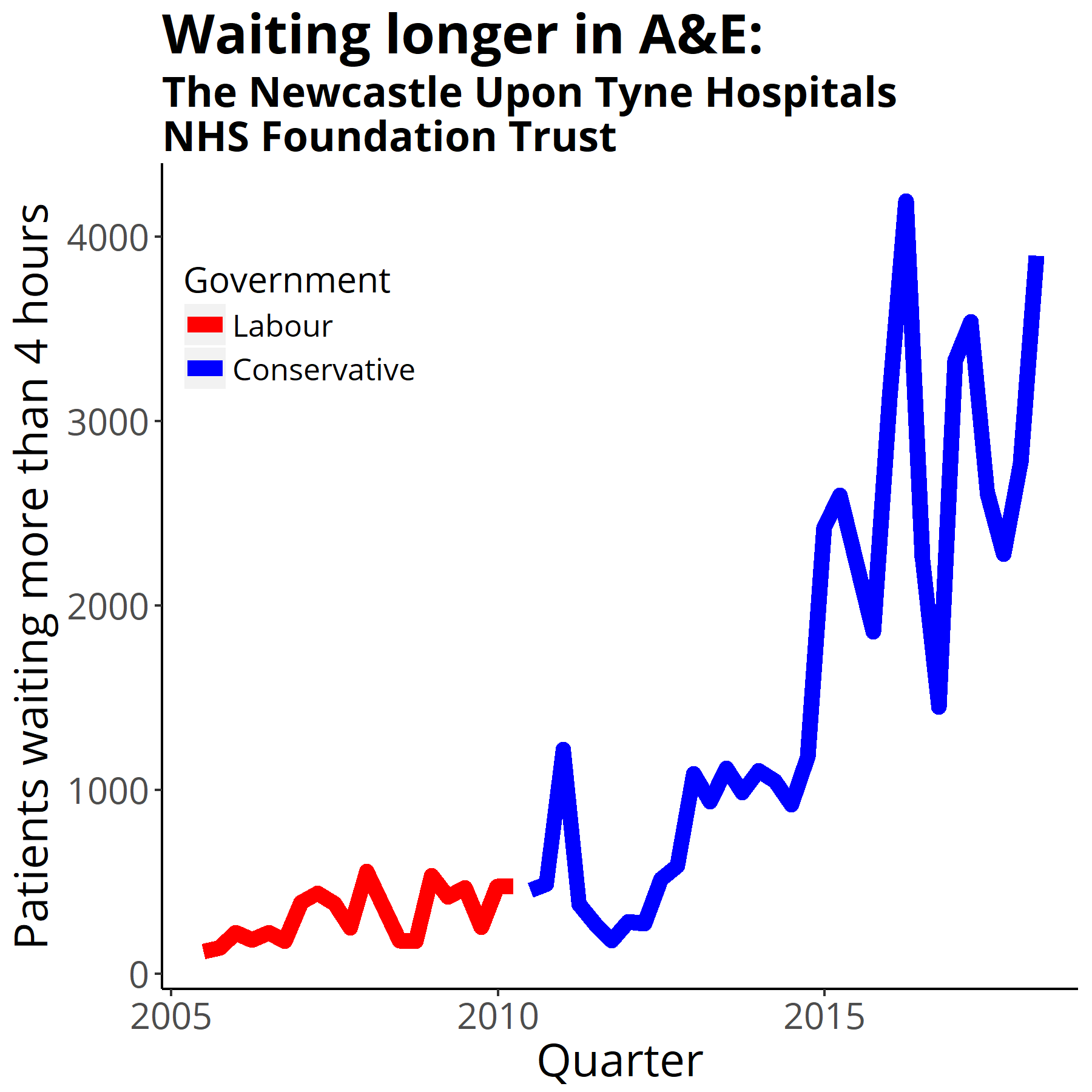
Four-hour target in the emergency department quarterly figures from NHS England Data from https://www.england.nhs.uk/statistics/statistical-work-areas/ae-waiting-times-and-activity/

The trust was highlighted by NHS England as having 4 (the most at any Trust) of the 148 reported never events in the period from April to September 2013.

The trust was rated outstanding by the Care Quality Commission in June 2016. It is fifth trust and first teaching hospital to be put in this category.

At the end of March 2017, the trust was confirmed as one of four additional NHS Global Digital Exemplars; joining the twelve announced in September 2016. In July 2018 it had 603 fax machines - more than any other trust in England.

It is one of the biggest providers of specialised services in England, which generated an income of £342.6 million in 2014/5.

== Development ==
In December 2013 it emerged that the trust was interested in expanding into Primary Care. Freeman Clinics, a joint venture with local GPs, was set up in 2008. There are three practices with varying ownership models − in two of them, all the GPs are salaried, while in the other, the practice's income is shared between the trust and GP partners.

The trust has one of the 11 Genomics Medicines Centres associated with Genomics England that opened across England in February 2014. All the data produced in the 100,000 Genomes project will be made available to drugs companies and researchers to help them create precision drugs for future generations.

The trust took over some services run by North Cumbria University Hospitals NHS Trust in 2016. Children's services were the first.

The trust was one of the beneficiaries of Boris Johnson's announcement of capital funding for the NHS in August 2019, with an allocation of £41,7 million for improving paediatric cardiac services.

In 2020 the trust managed the NHS Nightingale Hospital North East at the Centre of Excellence for Sustainable Advanced Manufacturing as part of the response to the COVID-19 pandemic.

== Staffing ==
In September 2015 it was reported that the trust was facing a staffing crisis because its plans to recruit more Filipino nurses were frustrated by the points-based immigration system. 85 applications for tier 2 certificates of sponsorship were rejected between June and September 2015. The NHS Employers Organisation wrote on behalf of the trust, and nine others similarly placed, to the Home Secretary, Theresa May complaining that about 1000 applications had been rejected in six months, and anticipating that a further thousand would also be rejected. The Home Office responded by saying that over 1,400 tier 2 certificates of sponsorship had been issued to nurses since April 2015, but 600 had been 'returned unused.' Nurses were removed from the Shortage Occupation List on 6 April 2015, and the pay of most nurses is not sufficient to gain priority under the points based system.

It was named by the Health Service Journal as one of the top hundred NHS trusts to work for in 2015. At that time it had 11,847 full-time equivalent staff and a sickness absence rate of 3.95%. 85% of staff recommend it as a place for treatment and 69% recommended it as a place to work.

== Controversy ==
On 12 January 2017 the Board of NUTH announced that Chief Executive Sir Leonard Fenwick had been placed on extended leave. A disciplinary panel was then convened, after an investigation was carried out into claims of bullying and abusive behaviour. It was claimed that Fenwick had tried to force the resignations of two consultants, who were caught having sex with junior members of staff on hospital premises. The dismissals were stopped by the trust's chair, Kingsley Smith, and non-executive director Bryan Dodson, and after a subsequent 20 minute hearing the two consultants were advised that they could keep their jobs. However, during the investigation allegations and issues were raised against Fenwick by different sources, which resulted in the Board commissioning an investigation and report by an outside HR specialist. This report led to a two-day disciplinary hearing, which found "allegations relating to inappropriate behaviour, use of resources and a range of governance issues, which were proven." Fenwick appealed against the decision, but a second independent panel again found the allegations proven, and resultantly Fenwick was dismissed on grounds of Gross Misconduct.

NUTH added that "Due to the serious nature of the issues the trust was required to report a number of concerns to NHS Counter Fraud and Security Management Services, known as NHS Protect. As a result it would be inappropriate for the trust to make any further comment on this matter."

== See also ==
- List of NHS trusts
