= 2019 Summer Transplant Games =

XXII World Transplant Games
- Host city: NewcastleGateshead
- Country: United Kingdom
- Nations: 60
- Events: 17 sports
- Opening: August 17, 2019
- Closing: August 23, 2019

The 2019 Transplant Games were a multi-sport event held from 17 to 23 August 2019, in Newcastle-Gateshead, United Kingdom. They were the 22nd edition of the World Transplant Games.

The games were organised by the World Transplant Games Federation (WTGF) and NewcastleGateshead Initiative.

== Participating nations ==
- Algeria
- Andorra
- Argentina
- Australia
- Austria
- Azerbaijan
- Belgium
- Brazil
- Canada
- Colombia
- Chile
- China
- Cyprus
- Czech Republic
- Denmark
- Ecuador
- Ethiopia
- Finland
- France
- Germany
- Great Britain
- Greece
- Hong Kong
- Hungary
- Iceland
- India
- Iran
- Ireland
- Israel
- Italy
- Japan
- Kazakhstan
- Kenya
- Luxembourg
- Malaysia
- Mexico
- Mongolia
- Morocco
- Nepal
- Netherlands
- New Zealand
- Norway
- Paraguay
- Poland
- Portugal
- Russia
- Singapore
- Slovakia
- Slovenia
- South Africa
- South Korea
- Spain
- Sweden
- Switzerland
- Thailand
- Turkey
- United States
- Uruguay
- Venezuela

== Sports ==
=== Individual sports ===
- Athletics
- Road Race (5 km)
- Badminton
- Bowling
- Cycling
- Darts
- Golf
- Kayak
- Swimming
- Pétanque
- Squash
- Table Tennis
- Tennis
- Virtual Triathlon

=== Team sports ===
- Basketball (3 on 3)
- Football
- Volleyball

== Medal table ==
Medals were awarded to the following countries:

* Host nation (Great Britain)

Rank	Nation	Gold	Silver	Bronze	Total
1	Great Britain	205	152	127	484
2	United States	67	51	38	156
3	Iran	26	35	33	94
4	Canada	23	21	20	64
5	South Africa	22	23	22	67
6	Thailand	22	19	31	72
7	Argentina	19	16	17	52
8	Hungary	18	26	33	77
9	Australia	18	13	11	42
10	Germany	14	17	14	45
11	Ireland	14	16	14	44
12	Hong Kong	14	6	14	34
13	Netherlands	12	15	16	43
14	France	11	14	16	41
15	Finland	11	14	12	37
16	Poland	11	11	8	30
17	Italy	11	6	13	30
18	Mexico	6	3	5	14
19	Japan	6	2	5	13
20	Sweden	6	0	3	9
21	Switzerland	5	5	11	21
22	Czech Republic	4	3	2	9
23	Greece	4	2	3	9
24	South Korea	4	0	1	5
25	Portugal	3	4	1	8
26	China	3	2	5	10
27	Spain	2	4	9	15
28	New Zealand	2	0	0	2
29	Brazil	1	4	12	17
30	Colombia	1	3	5	9
31	Belgium	1	2	2	5
31	Norway	1	2	2	5
33	Russia	1	2	1	4
34	Cyprus	1	2	0	3
34	India	1	2	0	3
36	Singapore	1	1	7	9
37	Paraguay	1	0	0	1
38	Austria	0	6	3	9
39	Andorra	0	2	0	2
40	Denmark	0	0	1	1
40	Kazakhstan	0	0	1	1
Totals (41 entries)		572	506	518	1,596
