= Princess Mary Maternity Hospital =

Maternity hospital in Newcastle upon Tyne

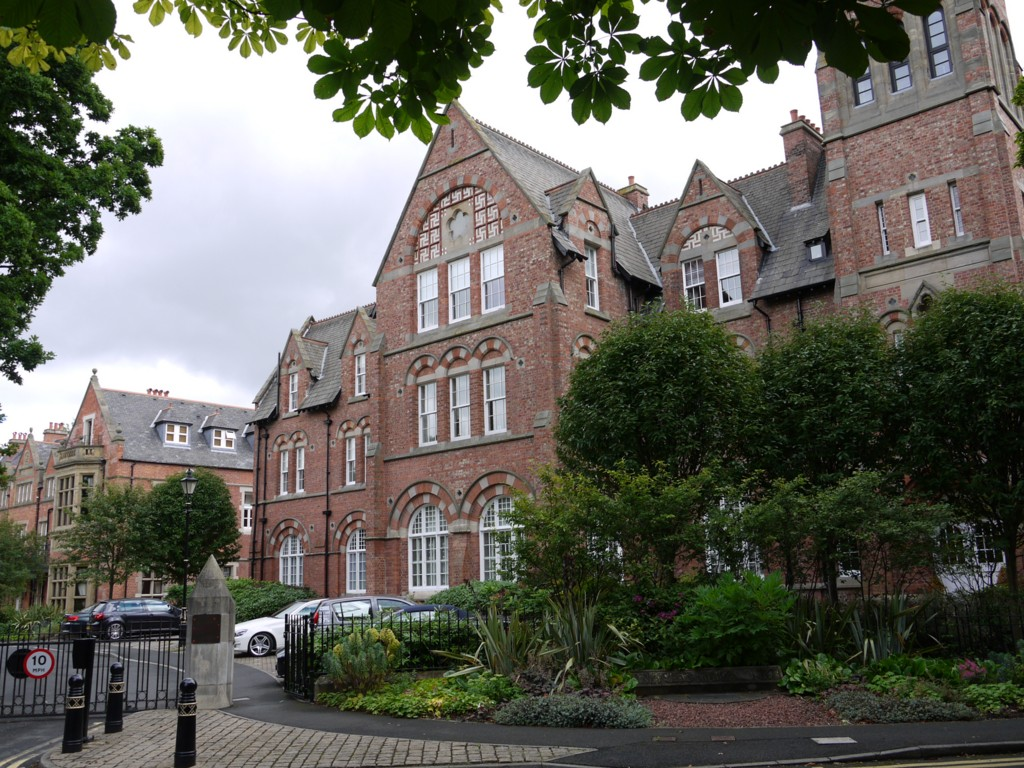
- Princess Mary Maternity Hospital in Jesmond

- Location in Newcastle upon Tyne Location in Tyne and Wear

Geography
- Location: Newcastle upon Tyne, England
- Coordinates: 54.9875°N 1.6135°W

Organisation
- Care system: NHS England
- Type: Maternity

History
- Founded: 1760
- Closed: 1993

Links
- Lists: Hospitals in England

The Princess Mary Maternity Hospital was a health facility in Jesmond, Newcastle upon Tyne. It is a Grade II listed building.

== History ==
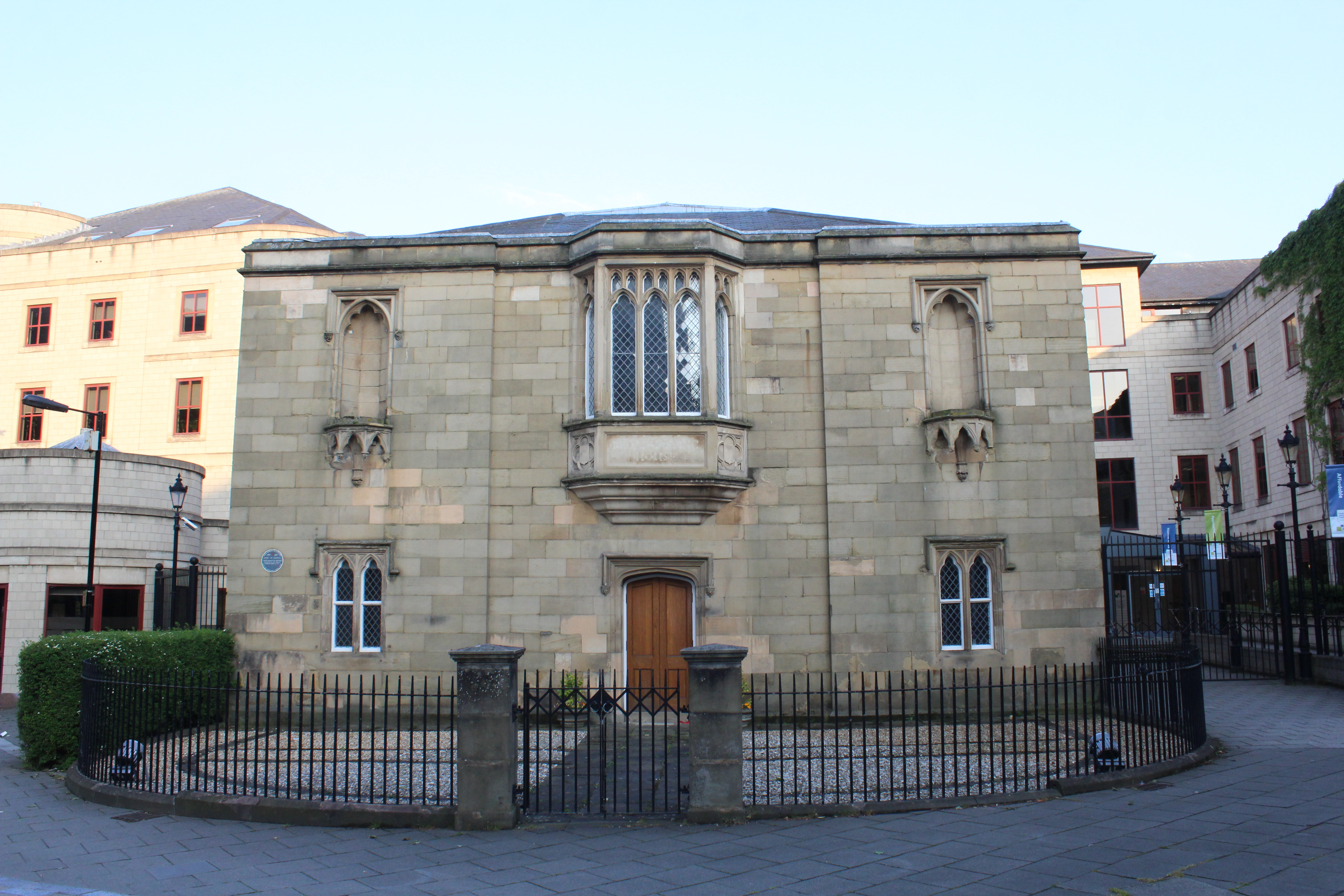
The former Lying-in Hospital in New Bridge Street

The hospital has its origins in the Lying-in Hospital established in Rosemary Lane in Newcastle upon Tyne in 1760. Lying-in is an archaic term for childbirth (referring to the month-long bed rest prescribed for postpartum confinement). The Lying-in Hospital moved to a purpose-built facility in New Bridge Street designed by John Dobson in 1826. (Note: The former Lying-in Hospital building in New Bridge Street was converted for commercial use by the BBC in 1925 and, after the BBC moved to Spital Tongues in 1986, it became offices for Newcastle Building Society.)

After the Lying-in Hospital in New Bridge Street was deemed inadequate, a new facility was built in Jubilee Road and officially opened by Princess Mary as the Princess Mary Maternity Hospital in 1923. During the Second World War the hospital moved to the old home of the Northern Counties Orphans' Institution in Jesmond. (Note: The Orphans' Institution, which had been designed by George Tunstal Redmayne and financed by Ralph Clark Phillipson, was completed in 1873.) After maternity services transferred to the Royal Victoria Infirmary, the Princess Mary Maternity Hospital closed in 1993 and the building was converted into apartments as Princess Mary Court in 2000.
