= Newcastle General Hospital =

- Newcastle upon Tyne Hospitals NHS Foundation Trust
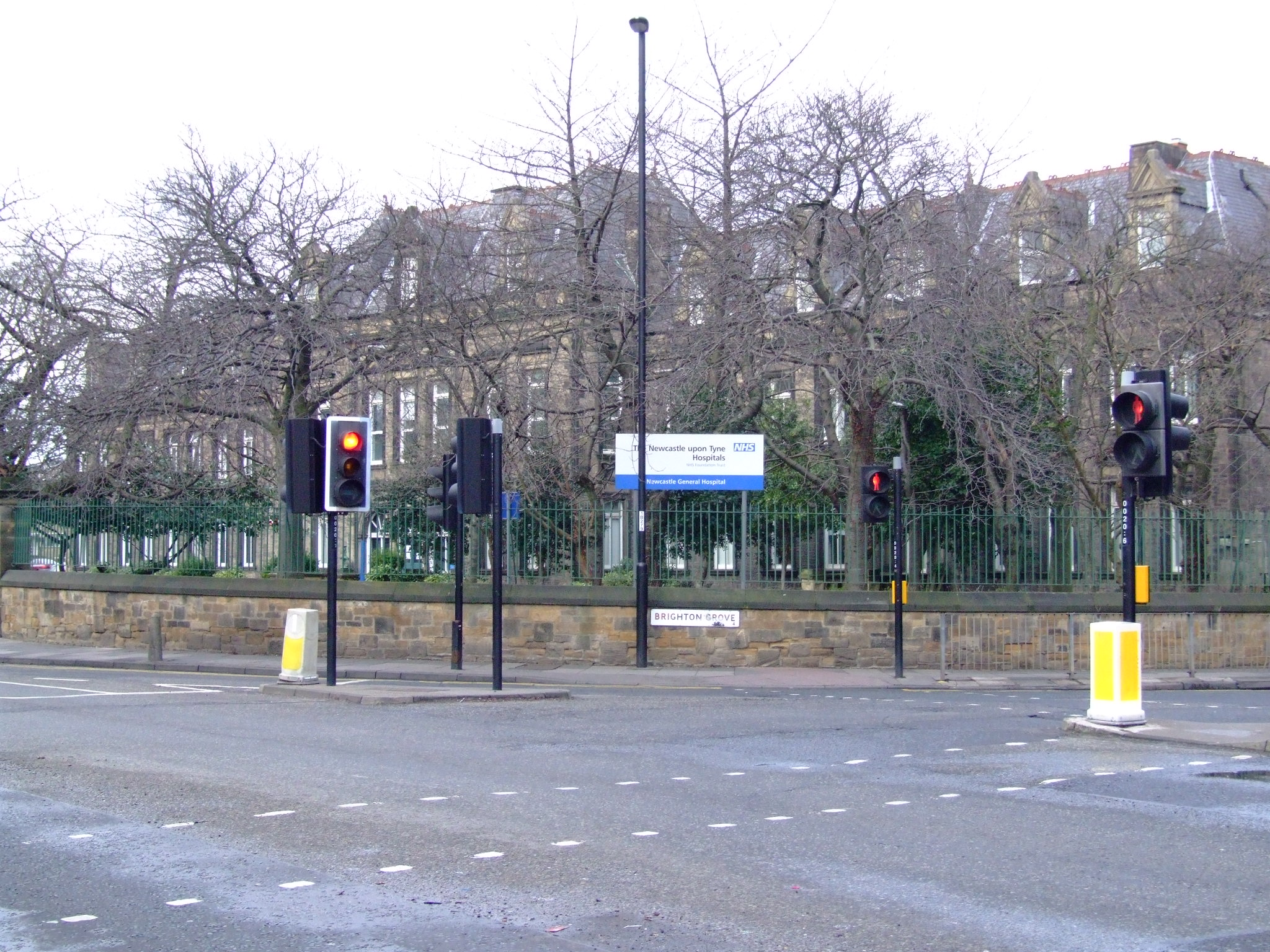
- Newcastle General Hospital

- Location in Newcastle upon Tyne Location in Tyne and Wear

Geography
- Location: Newcastle, England
- Coordinates: 54.976°N 1.645°W

Organisation
- Care system: NHS England
- Type: Teaching

History
- Founded: 1870

Links
- Website: www.newcastle-hospitals.org.uk/index.aspx
- Lists: Hospitals in England

Newcastle General Hospital (NGH) was for many years the main hospital for the city of Newcastle upon Tyne, England. As part of Newcastle upon Tyne Hospitals NHS Foundation Trust moving from three to two key sites, the hospital was closed and most of the services transferred to the city's other two hospitals, the Royal Victoria Infirmary and the Freeman Hospital. The Accident and Emergency Department and Intensive Care closed on 16 November 2010. A walk-in centre for minor ailments and injuries remained on the site.

== History ==
The hospital was originally constructed as the infirmary for the Newcastle Union Workhouse. Building began in 1868 and it opened in 1870. In 1921 the administration of the hospital was separated from the Workhouse and the name was changed to the Wingrove Hospital. In 1948 the name was changed to the Newcastle General Hospital when it became part of the National Health Service.

The Newcastle upon Tyne Hospitals NHS Foundation Trust reorganised the way it provided acute and tertiary health care in the city and most of the acute services at the hospital were moved to the Freeman Hospital and the Royal Victoria Infirmary between 2008 and 2010.

Newcastle University bought the site in 2019 and plans to develop the UK's first health innovation neighbourhood.

== See also ==
- List of hospitals in England
