= 2017 Youth Parapan American Games =

International multi-sport event

IV Youth Parapan American Games
- Host: São Paulo, Brazil
- Nations: 19
- Athletes: 808
- Events: 12 sports
- Opening: March 20
- Closing: March 25
- Main venue: Anhembi Convention Center

The 2017 Youth Parapan American Games were a multi-sport event held from March 20 March 25, 2017 in São Paulo, Brazil. They were the fourth edition of the Youth Parapan American Games and they were organized by the Brazilian Paralympic Committee (CPB) and the International Paralympic Committee (IPC).

== Organization ==
=== Venues ===
All competitive events were held at the Paralympic Training Centre. The opening and closing ceremonies took place in the Exhibition Pavilion of the Anhembi Convention Center.

Venue	Location	Sports
Anhembi Convention Center	Santana	Opening ceremony Closing ceremony
Paralympic Training Centre	Ipiranga	Athletics; Boccia; Football 7-a-side Football 5-a-side Goalball; Judo; Swimming; Powerlifting; Sitting volleyball Table tennis Wheelchair basketball Wheelchair tennis

=== Mascot ===
The mascot of the São Paulo 2017 Youth Parapan American Games was a Mona ("monkey" in Spanish), a female howler monkey, a species native to the São Paulo Atlantic Forest. The name chosen by popular vote, held on the Brazilian Paralympic Committee's Facebook page.

== The Games ==
=== Participating nations ===
- Argentina (120)
- Aruba (2)
- Brazil (172)
- Canada (3)
- Chile (55)
- Colombia (135)
- Costa Rica (3)
- Dominican Republic (19)
- Ecuador (24)
- El Salvador (24)
- Guatemala (4)
- Honduras (3)
- Jamaica (4)
- Mexico (95)
- Nicaragua (3)
- Panama (18)
- Peru (12)
- Suriname (1)
- United States (4)
- Venezuela (107)

=== Sports ===
- Athletics
- Boccia
- Football 5-a-side
- Football 7-a-side
- Goalball
- Judo
- Powerlifting
- Swimming
- Sitting volleyball
- Table tennis
- Wheelchair basketball
- Wheelchair tennis

=== Calendar ===
OC	Opening ceremony	Event competitions	F	Event finals	CC	Closing ceremony

March	20 Mon	21 Tue	22 Web	23 Thu	24 Fri	25 Sat
Ceremonies	OC					CC
Athletics		F	F	F	F	
Boccia					F	
Football 5-a-side					SF	F
Football 7-a-side				SF		F
Goalball					F	F
Judo				F	F	
Powerlifting		F	F			
Swimming		F	F	F	F	
Sitting volleyball					F	F
Table tennis			F			F
Wheelchair basketball					SF	F
Wheelchair tennis					F	
March	20 Mon	21 Tue	22 Web	23 Thu	24 Fri	25 Sat

=== Medals table ===
* Host nation (Brazil)

Rank	Nation	Gold	Silver	Bronze	Total
1	Brazil (BRA)*	65	40	32	137
2	Colombia (COL)	47	39	25	111
3	Mexico (MEX)	22	29	21	72
4	Argentina (ARG)	22	29	17	68
5	Chile (CHI)	14	10	4	28
6	Venezuela (VEN)	7	10	12	29
7	Ecuador (ECU)	6	7	7	20
8	El Salvador (ESA)	3	0	2	5
9	Dominican Republic (DOM)	1	3	4	8
10	Costa Rica (CRC)	1	2	3	6
11	Canada (CAN)	1	0	1	2
12	Panama (PAN)	0	1	5	6
13	Jamaica (JAM)	0	1	2	3
14	Peru (PER)	0	1	1	2
15	Aruba (ARU)	0	1	0	1
15	United States (USA)	0	1	0	1
17	Honduras (HON)	0	0	1	1
18	Guatemala (GUA)	0	0	0	0
18	Nicaragua (NCA)	0	0	0	0
18	Suriname (SUR)	0	0	0	0
Totals (20 entries)		189	174	137	500

Source: Sao Paulo Official Results Book
