= Natividad Relucio-Clavano =

Filipino paediatrician

Natividad Relucio Clavano
- Born: Naividad Relucio; 1 October 1932; Manila, Philippine Islands, United States
- Died: 4 October 2007 (aged 75); Manila, Philippines
- Education: University of Santo Tomas
- Occupation: Pediatrician

Natividad Relucio Clavano (1 October 1932 – 4 October 2007) was a Filipino pediatrician. As chief of pediatrics at Baguio General Hospital, she studied the benefits of breastfeeding over infant formula and reformed the model of care provided to newborns and their mothers.

== Biography ==
Clavano was born in Manila on 1 October 1932 to an upper-class family. She completed her medical studies at the University of Santo Tomas in 1957. She travelled to London in 1974 for postgraduate research; she intended to study asthma in children but her research supervisor, David Morley, convinced her to focus on causes of infant mortality in Filipino babies. At the time in the Philippines, newborns were typically removed from their mothers after birth and placed in a nursery where they were fed infant formula. Attitudes towards formula-feeding were beginning to shift in western medicine, and a boycott was launched against Nestlé in the 1970s and 1980s in favour of breastfeeding.

When Clavano returned to work in Baguio—where she later became head of paediatrics at Baguio General Hospital—she reformed the model of care provided to newborns and their mothers. Newborns were no longer fed a starter-dose of formula, mothers and babies were placed in the same hospital rooms, mothers were encouraged to breastfeed on demand rather than on a timetable, and nurses were retrained to recognise normal breast milk stools (which were often mistaken for diarrhoea). Clavano led a study of 10,000 babies born at Baguio General Hospital in the 1970s, comparing those born in 1973–75 (when the majority were formula-fed) and 1975–77 (when the majority were breastfed). The study showed a significant reduction in rates of death, sepsis, diarrhoea, and oral thrush.

Clavano advocated for breastfeeding internationally, and her research work "gave foundation to a global movement" according to Patti Rundall of Baby Milk Action. She spoke at an enquiry chaired by U.S. Senator Ted Kennedy in 1978, and her research was used to support UNICEF's Baby Friendly Hospital Initiative, which promotes breastfeeding in hospitals. Within the Philippines, she contributed to the passage of the 1986 Philippine National Milk Code and the 1992 Rooming-In and Breastfeeding Act. She was made a Commander of the Order of the Golden Heart in 2006. On 4 October 2007, aged 76, she died from a respiratory illness.
