= World Transplant Games =

International Sporting Event

The World Transplant Games (WTG) are an international multi-sport event, occurring every two years, organized by the World Transplant Games Federation (WTGF). The Games promote amateur sport amongst organ transplant recipients, living donors and donor families.

Summer and winter sports alternate years and the event is open to anyone who has received a solid organ transplant including liver, heart, lung, kidney, pancreas or bone marrow. The idea is that people who receive these organs need to take immunosuppressants for the rest of their lives and since such drugs affect athletic performance, the games were started to give donors a level playing field.

== History ==
The games started in 1978 in Portsmouth, England with about 100 athletes from the UK, France, Germany, Greece and the United States.

The 2023 games in Perth, Australia include competitors from more than 60 countries and include events over seven days such as cycling, swimming, darts, bowling and more. There are ceremonies during each of the games to honor the families of the deceased and living donors.

== Summer Games ==
In 1987 and 2017 the World Transplant Games Federation was officially formed.

Now has nearly 70 member countries.

2013 and 2021 Recognized by IOC.

Year	Games	Host	Dates	Nations	Athletes	Ref
1978	1	(United Kingdom) Portsmouth, Great Britain		5	100	
1979	2	(United Kingdom) Portsmouth, Great Britain				
1980	3	New York City, United States				
1982	4	Athens, Greece				
1984	5	Amsterdam, Netherlands				
1987	6	Innsbruck, Austria				
1989	7	Singapore				
1991	8	Budapest, Hungary				
1993	9	Vancouver, British Columbia, Canada				
1995	10	(United Kingdom) Manchester, Great Britain				
1997	11	Sydney, Australia				
1999	12	Budapest, Hungary				
2001	13	Kobe, Japan				
2003	14	Nancy, France				
2005	15	London, Ontario, Canada				
2007	16	Bangkok, Thailand				
2009	17	Gold Coast, Australia				
2011	18	Gothenburg, Sweden				
2013	19	Durban, South Africa				
2015	20	Mar del Plata, Argentina	23 – 30 August	44	1,110	
2017	21	Málaga, Spain	25 June – 2 July	52	2,500	
2019	22	(United Kingdom) Newcastle upon Tyne and Gateshead, Great Britain	17 – 23 August	60	2,400	
2021	23	(United States) 5K AnyWay (2021 Games set for Houston cancelled)	Virtual			
2023	24	Perth, Australia	15 – 21 April			
2025	25	Dresden, Germany	16 – 23 August			
2027	26	Leuven, Belgium	1 – 8 August			

== Winter Games ==
Year	Games	Host	Dates	Nations	Athletes	Ref
1994	1	Tignes, France				
1996	2	Pra-Loup, France				
1999	3	Snowbird, Utah, United States				
2001	4	Nendaz, Switzerland				
2004	5	Bormio, Italy				
2008	6	Rovaniemi, Finland				
2010	7	Sainte-Foy-Tarentaise, France				
2012	8	Anzere, Switzerland				
2014	9	La Chapelle-d'Abondance, France				
2016	-	not held				
2018	10	Anzère, Switzerland	7–12 January			
2020	11	Banff, Alberta, Canada	23–28 February			
2022		(Postponed)				
2024	12	Bormio, Italy	3–8 March			

== Sports ==
=== Youth and Core Sports ===
19 Youth Sports: 10 Summer + 9 Winter Sports

20 Core Sports: 14 Summer + 6 Winter Sports

Summer: Badminton, Bowling, Cycling, Darts, Golf, Petanque, Road Running, Squash, Swimming, Track & Field, Table Tennis, Tennis, 3 on 3 Basketball, Volleyball

Winter: Curling, Biathlon, Skiing, Snowboarding, Cross Country, Snowshoeing

=== All Sports ===
Summer:

1. Athletics
2. Athletics (road race)
3. Swimming
4. Cycling
5. Kayak
6. Badminton
7. Table tennis
8. Paddle tennis
9. Tennis
10. Squash
11. Triathlon
12. Bowling
13. Darts
14. Golf
15. Lawn bowls
16. Pétanque
17. Tejo
18. 3x3 basketball
19. Volleyball

Winter:

1. Biathlon
2. Curling
3. Snowboarding
4. Skiing
- Slalom
- Giant Slalom
- Super Giant Slalom
- Parallel Slalom
- Nicholas Cup : Slalom Race for Children (A Ski Event for Transplanted Children)

SPORTS – DONORS (including deceased donor families and living donors) • Road Race • 50m Freestyle • Athletics: 100m sprint, ball throw, long jump

== Records ==
Results & Awards

== Age Groups ==
Seniors age groups:

- (18-29), (30-39), (40-49), (50-59), (60-69), (70-79) and (80+). Doubles events: (18-29), (30-49) and (50+).

Juniors age groups:

- (5 years and under), (6-8), (9-11), (12-14) and (15-17). Juniors 16 or 17 years of age are permitted to compete in adult age events, but must then compete only in adult events.

== Medals ==
=== Summer ===
1978: 99 competitors UK, France, Germany, Greece and the USA.

2011: Sweden 17-24 June, 2011 Team UK 115 Gold, 94 Silver and 77 Bronze medals

2013:

2015:

2017:

2019:

2021:

2023:

2025:

=== Winter ===
2020:

2024:
