= Fleming Memorial Hospital =

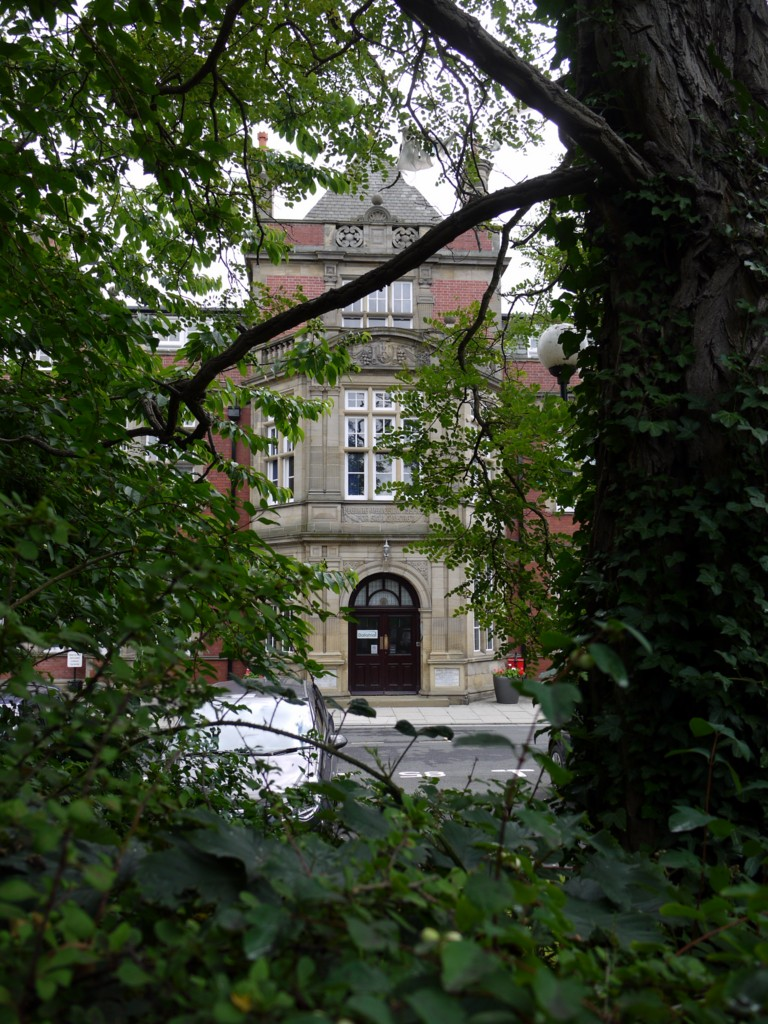
- Fleming Memorial Hospital in Jesmond

- Location in Newcastle upon Tyne Location in Tyne and Wear

Geography
- Location: Newcastle upon Tyne, England
- Coordinates: 54.9868°N 1.6135°W

Organisation
- Care system: NHS England
- Type: Children's services

History
- Founded: 1863
- Closed: 1988

Links
- Lists: Hospitals in England

Fleming Memorial Hospital was a children's health facility in Abbotsford Terrace, Jesmond, Newcastle upon Tyne. It is a Grade II listed building.

== History ==
The hospital has its origins in the Children's Hospital established by Dr Joseph Fife and Dr William Murray in Hanover Square in Newcastle upon Tyne in 1863. After the Children's Hospital established in Hanover Square was deemed inadequate, a new facility, which was designed by John Quilter and George Wheelhouse and financed with a donation by John Fleming, a local solicitor, was officially opened in Jesmond by Lord Armstrong in September 1888. After children's services transferred to the Royal Victoria Infirmary, the Fleming Memorial Hospital closed in 1988 and the building was converted for commercial use as the Fleming Business Centre in 2019.
