= 2013 Youth Parapan American Games =

III Youth Parapan American Games
- Host: Buenos Aires, Argentina
- Nations: 16
- Athletes: 600
- Events: 10 sports
- Opening: October 14
- Closing: October 19
- Opened by: Alicia Kirchner
- Main venue: Tecnópolis

The 2013 Youth Parapan American Games (Spanish: Juegos Juveniles Parapanamericanos de 2013) were a multi-sport event held from 14 to 19 October 2013 in Buenos Aires, Argentina. They were the third edition of the Youth Parapan American Games and they were organized by the Ministry of Social Development, the Argentinian Paralympic Committee (COPAR), the ENARD and the International Paralympic Committee.

== Venues ==
All competitive venues were located in Núñez.

Venue	Sports
CeNARD	Athletics; Boccia; Goalball; Judo; Olympic weightlifting Swimming
University of Buenos Aires	Wheelchair basketball Football 7-a-side Wheelchair tennis
SNR	Table tennis
Tecnópolis	Opening ceremony

== Medals table ==
Rank	Nation	Gold	Silver	Bronze	Total
1	Brazil (BRA)	102	65	42	209
2	Mexico (MEX)	58	55	42	155
3	Argentina (ARG)	38	51	44	133
4	Venezuela (VEN)	26	18	22	66
5	Colombia (COL)	12	11	14	37
6	Ecuador (ECU)	7	2	7	16
7	Trinidad and Tobago (TRI)	4	0	0	4
8	Chile (CHI)	3	6	9	18
9	Panama (PAN)	2	2	5	9
10	Dominican Republic (DOM)	2	0	0	2
11	Puerto Rico (PUR)	1	0	0	1
11	United States (USA)	1	0	0	1
13	Nicaragua (NCA)	0	3	2	5
14	Costa Rica (CRC)	0	2	1	3
15	Canada (CAN)	0	1	0	1
Totals (15 entries)		256	216	188	660

== See also ==
- 2015 Summer Transplant Games
