= Donald Court =

British paediatrician

Professor Donald Court CBE FRCP
- Born: Seymour Donald Mayneord Court; 4 January 1912; Wem, Shropshire
- Died: 9 September 1994 (aged 82); Newcastle upon Tyne, England
- Education: University of Birmingham,
- Awards: CBE, FRCP
- Scientific career
- Fields: Pediatrics
- Workplaces: Queen's Hospital, Great Ormond Street Hospital, Westminster Hospital, Durham University, Newcastle University

Seymour Donald Mayneord Court (born 4 January 1912 in Wem, died 9 September 1994 in Newcastle upon Tyne) was a British paediatrician who was known for his achievements in the fields of respiratory disease and the epidemiology of disease in childhood. He was also known for working, in a primary role, that established the importance of research into the social and behavioural aspects of illness in childhood.

== Life ==
Donald Court was the son of David Henry Court, a schoolmaster, and his wife Ethel Fanny (née Mayneord). Court was educated at the Adams Grammar School in Newport, Shropshire and in the local school in Redditch, Worcestershire. Court initially studied to be a dentist at University of Birmingham, but switched after three years into Medicine in 1936, winning the Russell memorial prize in neurology. As a resident, Court took a position in Queen's Hospital and Birmingham General Hospital. Positions followed at Great Ormond Street Hospital and later as paediatric registrar at Westminster Hospital.

With World War II approaching, Court could have been conscripted but was exempted as he was a member of the Religious Society of Friends and served with the Emergency medical services during the war.

After the war in 1946, he joined the department of health as a Nuffield fellow at King's College, Durham University. A year later he was appointed as a Reader to King's College, University of Durham in 1955, later the Newcastle University. In 1955 he succeeded Professor James Spence on his death, to conduct research in the Department of Child Health, becoming the first James Spence professor of child health. In 1972, Court retired from the chair and became the Emeritus Professor of Child Health in the University of Newcastle. From 1973 to 1976 he was president of the British Paediatric Association, later called the Royal College of Paediatrics and Child Health.

He married Dr. Frances Edith Radcliffe, in 1939 and had a daughter and two sons. In 1986, he suffered a serious head injury, from which he never fully recovered, and affected his retirement.

== Thousand Family Study ==
When Court joined Newcastle University, he became involved in the Thousand Families Study, a large and important epidemiological study, that was started by and among others, James Spence. During the period of the study, Court made over 3000 visits to the homes of families, selected for that study. Courts vision of the child changed during this study, and influenced him throughout his professional life. Instead of the prevailing view, which saw the child as a unit in isolation to be treated, Court now saw the child, as part of a network consisting of the family, the neighbourhood and the wider community, as a cogent whole.

Court took a specific interest in the common problems of childhood, including intussusception, Upper respiratory tract infection and the first to take an interest in speech disorders, and whose collaboratory efforts with Speech therapist led to a new university department of speech.

== Awards ==
In 1961, Donald Court was elected as a Fellow of the Royal College of Speech and Language Therapists.

Court was awarded a Commander of the Most Excellent Order of the British Empire (CBE) in 1969. In 1978 was awarded the prestigious James Spence Medal of the BPA, named in honour of his old colleague, James Calvert Spence. Professor Otto Wolff, spoke of the citation when awarding the medal to court, Wolff stated:

James Spence would have approved of our medallist. For many years, they worked together in Newcastle until 1954 when Spence died, and a year later Donald succeeded him, as head of the department, with the title of James Spence Professor of Child Health... Like James Spence, Donald is a superb clinician and a master of delicate art of taking a history.

Court was awarded the prestigious Nils Rosén von Rosenstein medal of the Swedish Paediatric Association. A number of honorary fellowships followed over the years, including the Royal Society of Medicine, the Royal College of General Practitioners and the Royal College of Speech and Language Therapists, celebrating a very active life.

== Bibliography ==
- The Medical Care of Children. An attempt to relate the experience of a group of paediatricians to the needs of doctors in family practice. Edited by Sir Seymour Donald Mayneord Court., Oxford University Press: London, 1963.
- Paediatrics in the Seventies: Developing the Child Health Service by Sir Seymour Donald Mayneord Court., Oxford University Press, 1972.
- Fit for the future:Article by Sir Seymour Donald Mayneord Court. Great Britain. Committee on Child Health Services., London : H.M.S.O., 1976
