= Thousand Families Study, Newcastle upon Tyne =

British epidemiological study

Thousand Families Study was a major epidemiological study, that arose through observations made by Sir James Spence, one of the first ever full-time paediatricians in the United Kingdom, and from 1942, the first holder of a University Chair of Child Health in England.

Prior to the Second World War, Newcastle City Council became increasingly concerned about the high infant mortality rate in the city (in 1939 the rate was 62 per 1000 live births) and asked Spence to undertake a review of all deaths of babies. Spence concluded that the excess infant mortality was due to death from acute infection. Further research was curtailed by the Second World War.

== The Start of the Newcastle Thousand Families Study ==
At the end of the war, the young doctors began to return to take up their former careers. One of those was Fred Miller and in 1946 Spence is reported to have said to him at a weekly departmental meeting "Well Freddie, what are we going to do about all these infections?". So began the Thousand Families Study.

The study was initially planned for only one year and aimed to confirm the earlier finding that acute infection was the major cause of infant mortality in the city, and in particular identify which factors put infants at a higher risk of such infections. In addition, it also aimed to place the health of the infants within the context of the family.

The study focused on all births in Newcastle in May and June 1947, an actual total of 1142 babies. The medical records of the participants were marked with a red sticker and the study is also popularly known as the Red Spot Study.

Several publications document the study:-
A Thousand Families in Newcastle upon Tyne by James Spence, W S Walton, F J W Miller and S D M Court, OUP, 1954 [This covers the first year of life]

Growing up in Newcastle upon Tyne by F J W Miller, S D M Court, W S Walton and E G Knox, OUP, 1960 [Pre-school years]

The School Years in Newcastle upon Tyne, 1952 - 1962 by F J W Miller, S D M Cour, E G Knox and S Brandon, OUP, 1974.

== Ongoing study ==
The study went on in detail until 1962. After this date follow-ups of some of the participants were conducted when they reached the age of 22 and 33. A major follow-up, with all participants invited, was conducted when the participants reached the age of 50. A range of health outcomes including cardiovascular disease, osteoporosis, diabetes, Helicobacter pylori, depression, telomere length, lung function and teeth were assessed in relation to the data collected at that follow-up and also that collected in previous follow-ups. this resulted in the study being a study of lifecourse epidemiology. The 60th anniversary of the study was marked by an exhibition at Newcastle's Discovery Museum and a civic reception hosted by the mayor of Newcastle. A further follow-up of the study members is being planned.

The records of the 1,000 Families Study are preserved at Tyne & Wear Archives Service.

== Direction ==
The study is directed by Dr Mark Pearce of Newcastle University.
