= Freeman Hospital =

- Newcastle upon Tyne Hospitals NHS Foundation Trust
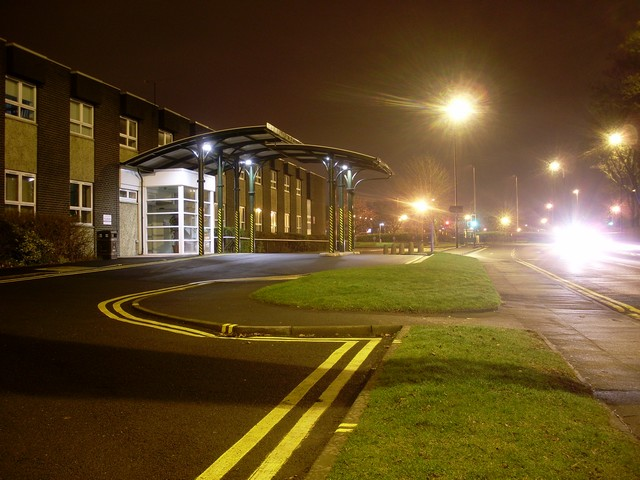
- Entrance to Freeman Hospital

- Location in Newcastle upon Tyne Location in Tyne and Wear

Geography
- Location: Heaton, Newcastle upon Tyne, England
- Coordinates: 55.002°N 1.594°W

Organisation
- Care system: NHS England
- Type: Teaching
- Affiliated university: Newcastle University Medical School

Services
- Emergency department: No
- Beds: 800

History
- Founded: 1977

Links
- Website: https://www.newcastle-hospitals.nhs.uk/hospitals/freeman-hospital/
- Lists: Hospitals in England

The Freeman Hospital is an 800-bed tertiary referral centre in Newcastle upon Tyne, England. The hospital is managed by the Newcastle upon Tyne Hospitals NHS Foundation Trust and is a teaching hospital for Newcastle University.

== History ==
The Freeman Hospital, which was designed by Newcastle Regional Hospital Department and built by John Laing, was completed in 1977, when services from several hospitals across the city were relocated into one centre. The name of the hospital recalls the life of Patrick Freeman, a tenant farmer, who, with his son, tilled the land which is now occupied by the hospital in the first half of the 19th century.

A major expansion of the site, including a new renal services centre and a new cancer treatment centre, known as the new Northern Centre for Cancer Care, was procured under a Private Finance Initiative contract in 2005. It was built by Laing O'Rourke at a cost of £150 million and opened in 2009.

== Services ==
The hospital is one of the main organ transplantation hospitals in the United Kingdom, mostly well known for its successful rates of infant cardiology and transplantation for adults. In 1987 the UK's first paediatric heart transplant was carried out on Kaylee Davidson-Olley, at the Freeman. It is funded and designated by the government as the UK's third transplant hospital. It made history when both the first successful single and double lung transplants in Europe were carried out at the hospital in 1990. The Freeman is the location of the Institute of Transplantation.

The Northern Cancer Centre is also home to the Bobby Robson clinical trials unit which specialises in oncology clinical trials.

== See also ==
- Sir Bobby Robson Foundation
- List of hospitals in the UK
