= Great North Children's Hospital =

- The Newcastle Upon Tyne Hospitals NHS Foundation Trust
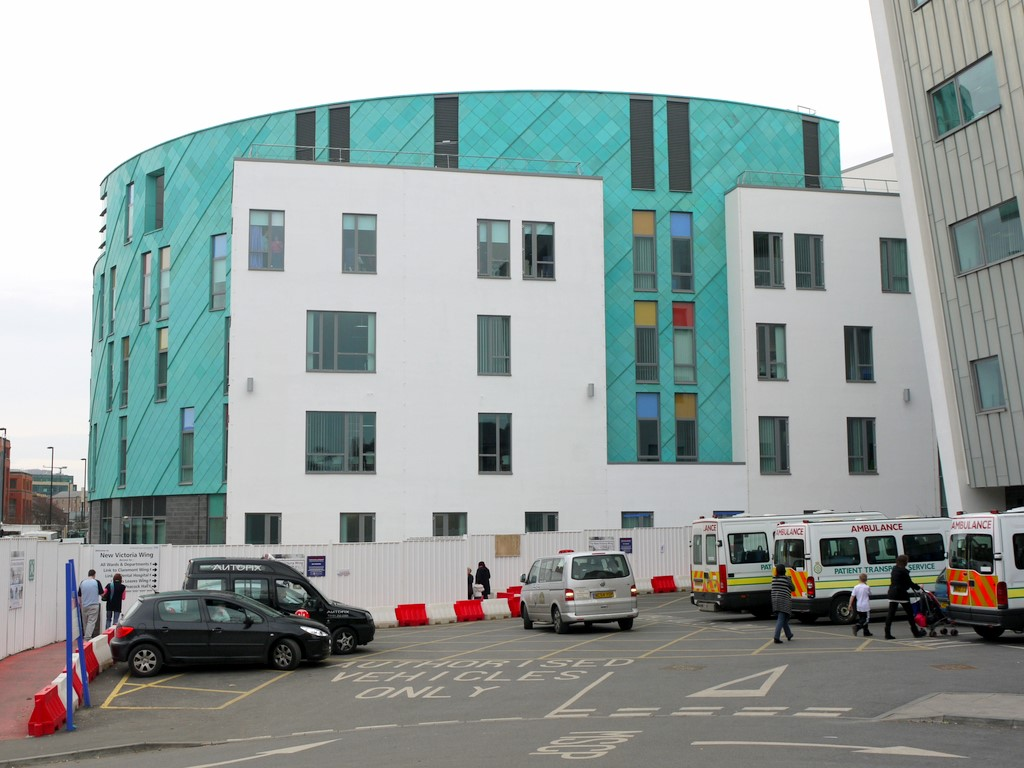

- Location in Newcastle upon Tyne Location in Tyne and Wear

Geography
- Location: Newcastle, NZ244651, England
- Coordinates: 54.981°N 1.620°W

Organisation
- Care system: NHS England
- Type: Teaching
- Affiliated university: Newcastle University Medical School

Services
- Emergency department: Yes
- Beds: 246

Links
- Website: http://www.newcastle-hospitals.org.uk/index.aspx
- Lists: Hospitals in England

The Great North Children's Hospital (GNCH) is a tertiary referral centre in Newcastle upon Tyne, England. The hospital is managed by the Newcastle upon Tyne Hospitals NHS Foundation Trust and is a teaching hospital for the University of Newcastle upon Tyne. It is one of only 14 such children's hospitals in the United Kingdom.

== History ==
The Great North Children's Hospital was opened in 2010, bringing together paediatric services from across Newcastle. The hospital has strong links with University of Newcastle upon Tyne which had the first academic unit of child health in England.

== Bubble Unit ==
The Great North Children's Hospital is one of two units in the UK which perform bone marrow transplants for children who were born with severe immune deficiencies. The Unit was established in 1987 and treats patients from the north of England, Scotland, Midlands, Northern Ireland and the Republic of Ireland as well as other European and middle eastern countries. Approximately 40 transplants are carried out each year.

The Great North Children's Hospital is one of 10 paediatric kidney transplant centres in the UK. It also provides the UK service for atypical Hemolytic-uremic syndrome ('HUS').
