= Royal Victoria Infirmary =

- Newcastle upon Tyne Hospitals NHS Foundation Trust
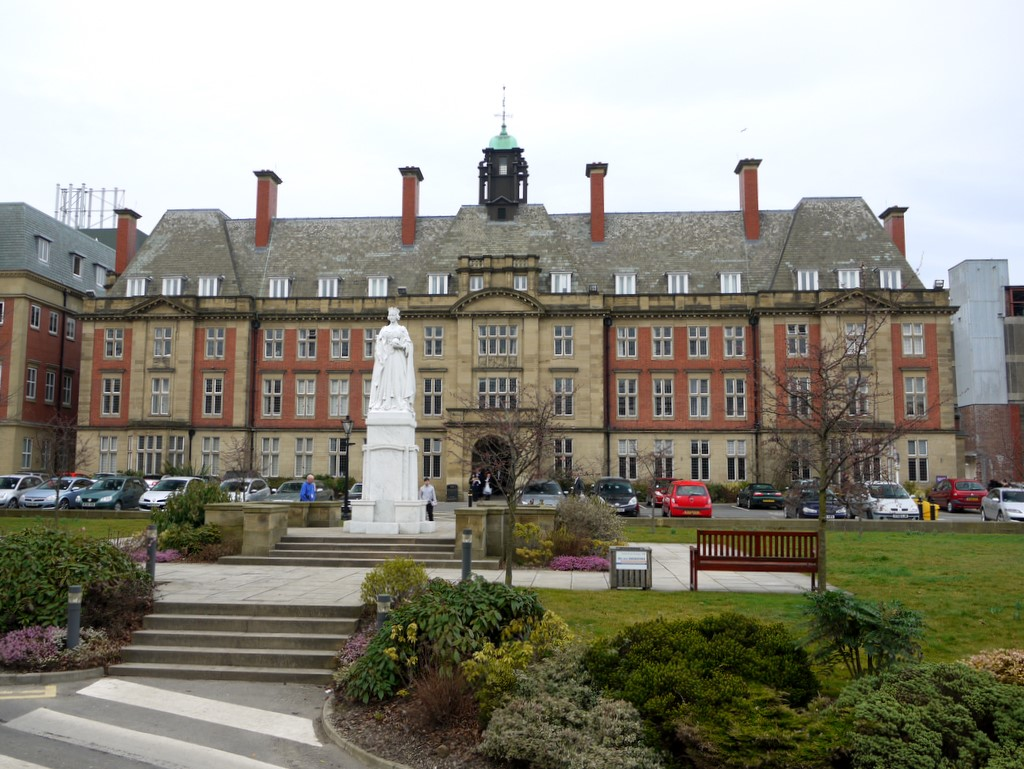
- The main administrative building of the Royal Victoria Infirmary, known as Peacock Hall.

- Location in Newcastle upon Tyne Location in Tyne and Wear

Geography
- Location: Newcastle, NZ244651, England
- Coordinates: 54.981°N 1.620°W

Organisation
- Care system: NHS England
- Type: Teaching
- Affiliated university: Newcastle University Medical School; Northumbria University (Nursing)

Services
- Emergency department: Major Trauma Centre – (Adult and Children)

History
- Founded: 1751 as Newcastle Infirmary; 1906 as the Royal Victoria Infirmary

Links
- Website: www.newcastle-hospitals.nhs.uk/hospitals/royal-victoria-infirmary/
- Lists: Hospitals in England

The Royal Victoria Infirmary (RVI) is a 673-bed tertiary referral hospital and research centre in Newcastle upon Tyne, England, with strong links to Newcastle University. The hospital is part of the Newcastle upon Tyne Hospitals NHS Foundation Trust and is a designated academic health science centre.

== History ==
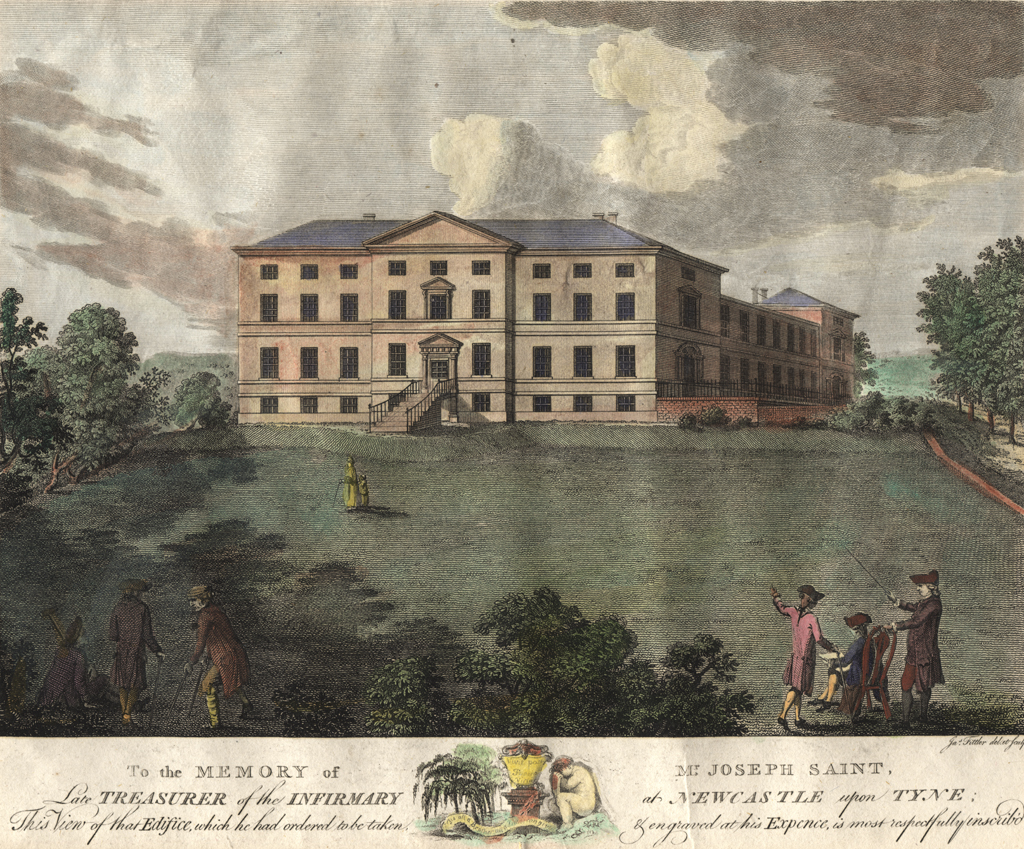
Print of the old Newcastle upon Tyne Infirmary at Forth Banks in 1786

The original hospital was the Newcastle upon Tyne Infirmary at Forth Banks which was funded by way of public subscription. The foundation stone was laid by Joseph Butler, the Bishop of Durham, on 5 September 1751, following the proposals of Richard Lambert. It opened on 8 October 1753. By the end of the 19th century, despite major extensions including the Dobson Wing which opened in 1855 and the Ravensworth Wards which opened in 1885, the infirmary became overcrowded and needed to be replaced.

A new hospital to be known as the Royal Victoria Infirmary was designed by William Lister Newcomb and Percy Adams and built on 10 acres (4 hectares) of Town Moor given by the Corporation and Freemen of the City of Newcastle upon Tyne. The foundation stone was laid by Albert Edward, Prince of Wales on 20 June 1900 and the building was subsequently opened by King Edward VII on 11 July 1906. The fully furnished and equipped hospital, containing seventeen wards, a nurses' home, chapel and five operating theatres, cost over £300,000. A statue of Queen Victoria in front of the new infirmary, sculpted by Sir George James Frampton in white stone, was the gift of Sir Riley Lord, who was knighted for his efforts in getting the infirmary built.

Fifty six nursery rhyme and fairy tale tiles, designed by artists William Rowe, Margaret Thompson and J.H. McLennan and made by Doulton, were installed in the children's ward in 1906. In the 1950s they were painted over but later uncovered. With the opening of a new children's ward in the early 1990s the cost of moving them was £240,000. During hospital expansion in 2004 the tiles were removed for storage and restoration; by 2009 a decision had not been made on their reinstallation.

The infirmary became a unit of the First Northern General Hospital and treated wounded service personnel during the First World War.

The Royal Victoria Infirmary had close links with King's College, Durham and, after it was formed, with Newcastle University as a major teaching hospital from when the university medical school was opened by King George VI in 1939.

Overcrowding was a problem, with waiting lists of over 5,000 in the 1930s and, until it joined the National Health Service in 1948, money had to be raised for extensions and new equipment – always difficult especially in the depression years. Later additions to the hospital included the Dental Hospital and School in 1978 and the Medical School in 1985. These additions were followed by Leazes Wing (facing Leazes Park) in 1992, the Sir James Spence Institute (named after Sir James Spence, a leading paediatrician) in 1994 and the Claremont Wing (on Claremont Road) in 1996. Although the Peacock Hall (the main administrative building) survived, many of the Edwardian buildings, including the old Eastern Block, were demolished at this time to make way for the new structures.

The late 20th century also brought consolidation of medical services in the city including the transfer to the infirmary of children's services from the Fleming Memorial Hospital in 1988 and of maternity services from the Princess Mary Maternity Hospital in 1993.

A major expansion of the site, including the New Victoria Wing, which includes a state-of-the-art accident and emergency department replacing that of the Newcastle General Hospital, and a new children's facility known as the Great North Children's Hospital was procured under a Private Finance Initiative contract in 2005. It was built by Laing O'Rourke at a cost of £150 million and opened in 2010.

== Facilities ==
The hospital has three main wings: the Leazes Wing, the Claremont Wing and the New Victoria Wing. The Great North Children's Hospital, one of only fourteen major children's medical centres in the UK, adjoins the New Victoria Wing. The infirmary is also the only provider of Mohs micrographic surgery for skin cancer in the North East of England.

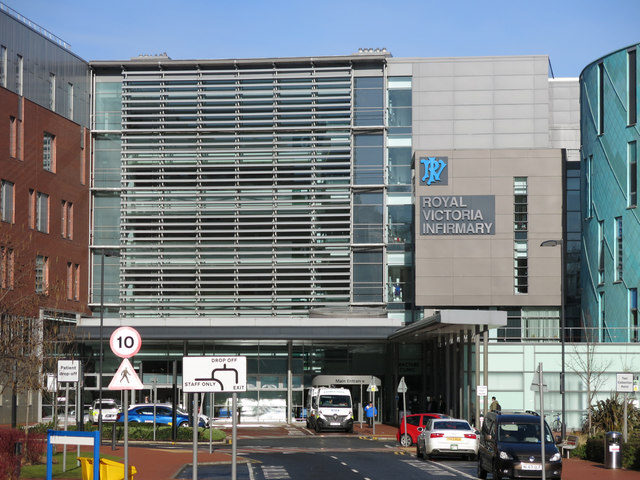
Entrance to the New Victoria Wing

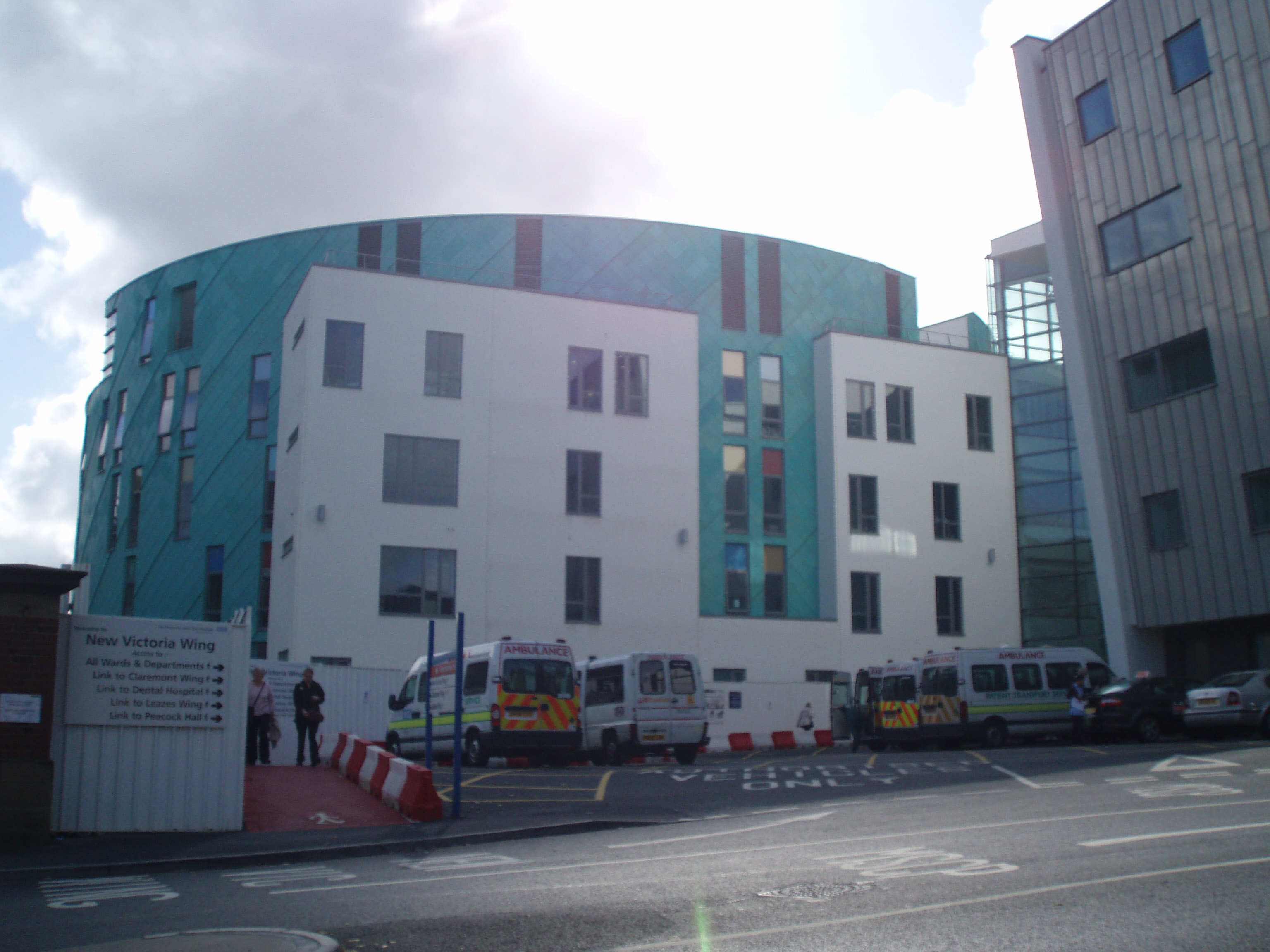
The Great North Children's Hospital which adjoins the New Victoria Wing

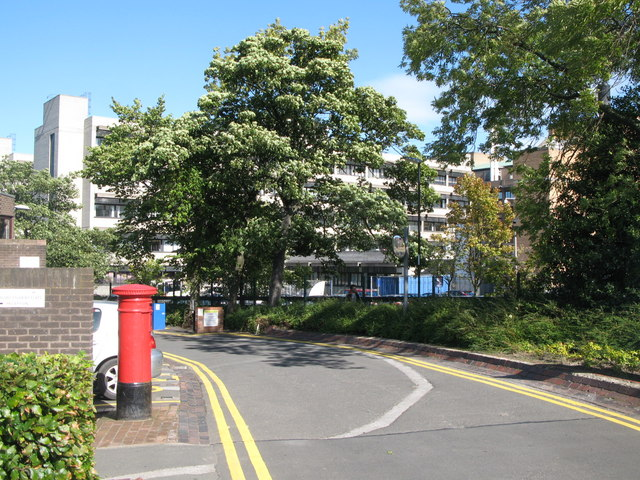
The Newcastle Dental Hospital which is on the same site

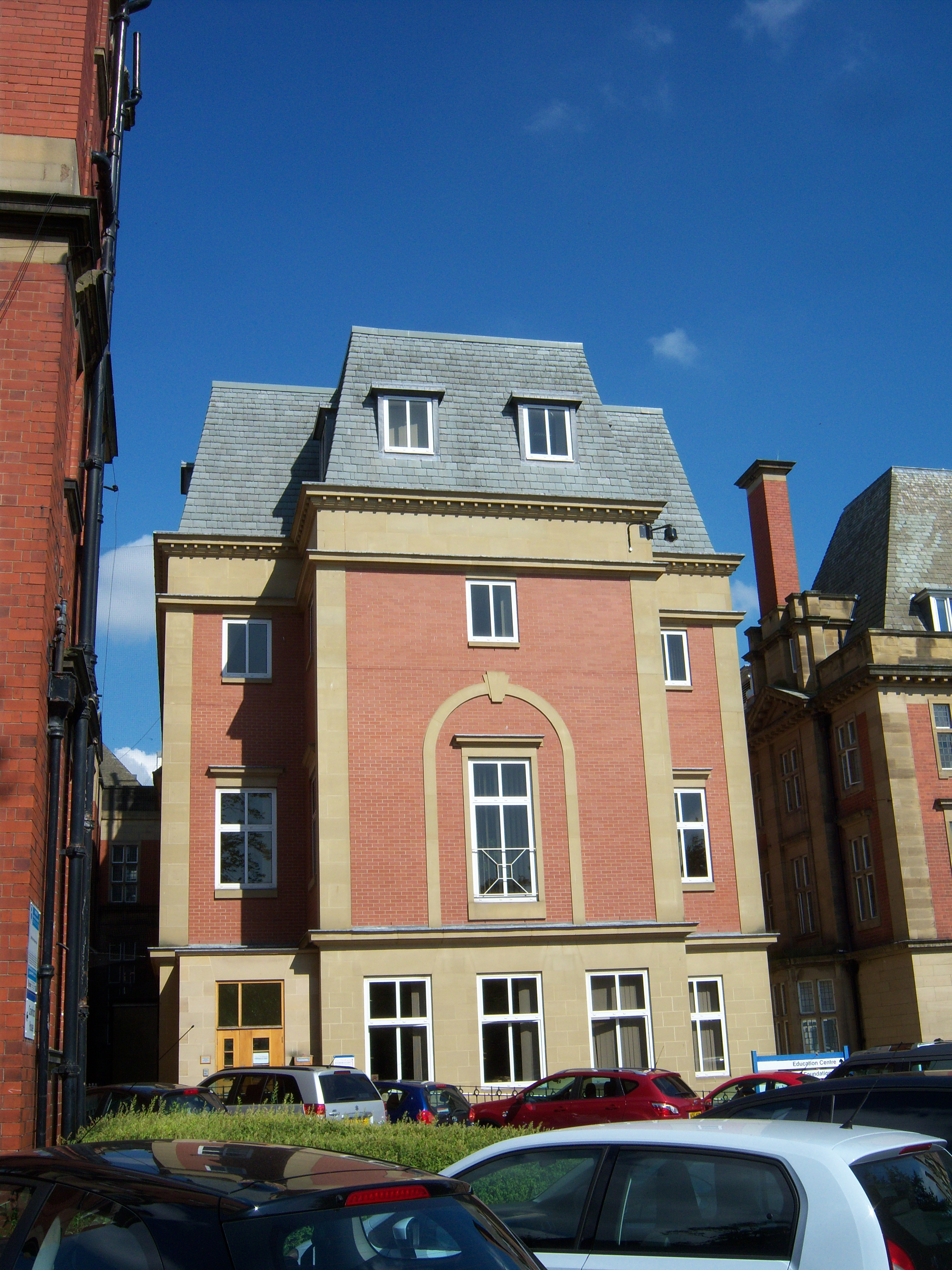
The Sir James Spence Institute

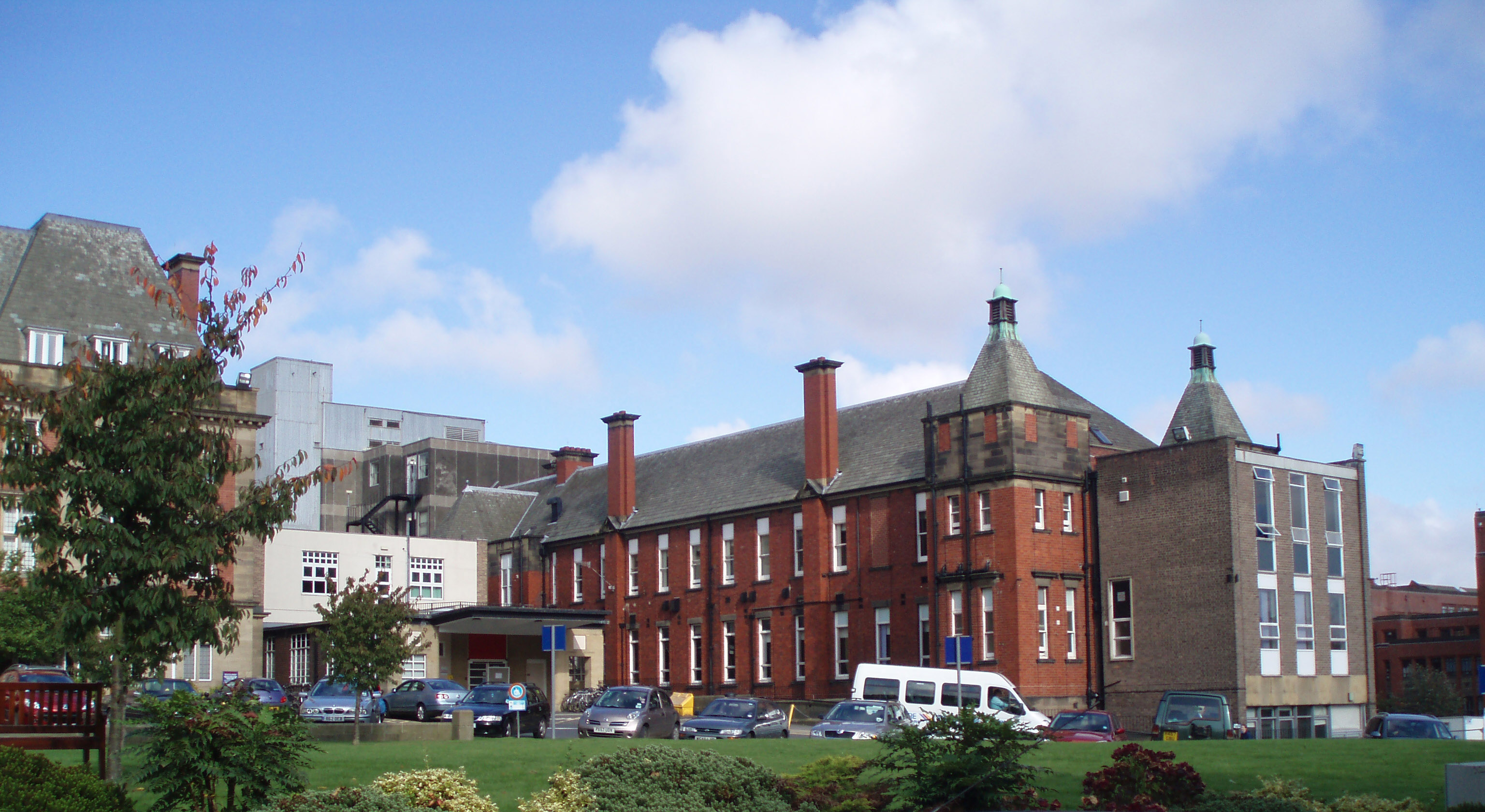
The Eastern Wing which was demolished in 2010

== See also ==
- List of hospitals in England

== Sources ==
- Hepplewhite, Peter (2002). Images of England - Newcastle upon Tyne. Stroud: Tempus Publishing Ltd. ISBN 0 7524 1598 0.
