= James Calvert Spence =

English paediatrician

Sir James Calvert Spence, FRCP MC & Bar (19 March 1892 – 26 May 1954) was an English paediatrician who was a pioneer in the field of social paediatrics. He was a founding member of the British Paediatric Association.

== Early life ==
Spence was born in Amble, Northumberland on 19 March 1892, the fourth son and seventh child of Isabella Turnbull and her husband, David Magnus Spence, an architect. After being educated at Elmfield College, York, he attended the Durham College of Medicine in Newcastle upon Tyne.

== World War I service ==
Spence went into the Royal Army Medical Corps. He served in the Gallipoli campaign, Egypt, and the Western Front. Captain Spence received the Military Cross (MC) for "conspicuous gallantry" and "devotion to duty" in attending wounded while under fire. Later, then Acting Major Spence received a bar to his MC for his actions at Oisy-le-Verger from 28 September to 2 October 1918.

== Medical career ==
After World War I, Spence worked as a house physician at the Royal Victoria Infirmary (RVI) in Newcastle upon Tyne and then moved on to work as a casualty officer at Great Ormond Street in London. He returned to Newcastle in 1922, where he took up the post of medical registrar and chemical pathologist at the RVI. He also joined the medical staff of a day nursery, in West Parade, Newcastle, which had been set up by a local wealthy lady to look after the children of munitions workers. The day nursery eventually became the Newcastle Babies' Hospital and provided the foundation for much of Spence's future work. In this institution, Spence and his staff developed the practice of social paediatrics.

In 1926–27 he spent a year at the Johns Hopkins Hospital in Baltimore as a Rockefeller Fellow, returning to the RVI in 1928. The period 1928–34 saw the publication of many of his most important works on scientific medicine. During the depression years, Spence was invited by the Newcastle city health committee to carry out a comparative study of The Health and Nutrition of Certain of the Children of Newcastle upon Tyne between the Ages of One and Five Years. Spence showed that 36 per cent of the children from 'poor districts of the city were unhealthy or physically unfit.' The correlation with malnutrition was not found in the control group of better class families, showing that the problem was preventable.

Spence was a strong advocate of breastfeeding, which he believed had superior health advantages. He was also acutely concerned that children have adequate nutrition during the time of wartime scarcity of food.

Spence began the practice, then unique in Britain, of admitting mothers to hospital with their sick children, so that they might nurse them and feel responsible for the child's recovery. Spence had begun receiving offers of professorial chairs, but declined them all as it would mean leaving Newcastle and the work to which he felt dedicated. He was by now paediatric physician at the Newcastle General Hospital and honorary physician to the Royal Victoria Infirmary. He also became Nuffield Professor of Child Health at Newcastle in 1942, and in 1948 when the National Health Service was established, Spence was a government adviser.

A subsequent study into infant mortality, again commissioned by the City Council, found the highest levels of infant mortality to be in the poorest areas of the city. The main cause of the excess mortality in these areas appeared to be infection. These two studies led on to one of the first ever longitudinal birth cohort studies, the Newcastle Thousand Families Study, although with the outbreak of the second world war, it was not until 1947 that the members of this cohort could be recruited. The Thousand Families Study was the basis of much of community paediatrics for the next 50 years.

Spence became a mentor in 1945 to Douglas Gairdner, who served for a time as Spence's first assistant.

He worked with and trained, Cynthia Illingworth, who went on to become the first consultant in paediatric accident and emergency in the United Kingdom.

== Medical philosophy ==
Spence always laid stress on the inclusion of the home as well as the hospital in the care of the sick child and throughout his teaching emphasised the preventive as well as the curative aspect of paediatrics. Spence combined clinical skills with great sensitivity as a doctor and his whimsical charm made him a most attractive personality. As a teacher and leader, he was outstanding and wrote: 'The first aim of my department is comradeship, not achievement.' His own achievements were of course great, and for his services to British medicine and medical education, he was knighted in the 1950 King's Birthday Honours. He summed up the practice of medicine as follows:

The real work of a doctor is not an affair of health centres, or laboratories, or hospital beds. Techniques have their place in medicine, but they are not medicine. The essential unit of medical practice is the occasion when, in the intimacy of the consulting room or sick room, a person who is ill, or believes himself to be ill, seeks the advice of a doctor whom he trusts. This is a consultation, and all else in the practice of medicine derives from it.

The Yellow Brick Road Children's Medical Research Centre at the Royal Victoria Infirmary is officially dedicated to Sir James Spence. The cost of £5 million was raised entirely from people in the North East of England in less than four years by the North-East Charity, the Children's Foundation.

== Personal life ==
Spence married Kathleen Downie-Leslie of Aberdeen in 1920. They had four daughters and one son.

Spence kept a holiday home in Grasmere. Spence enjoyed mountain climbing.

== Death ==
Spence died on 26 May 1954 at the age of 62, after an illness of several years.

== Honours ==
The British Paediatric Association (now the Royal College of Paediatrics and Child Health) created the James Spence Medal in his honour. The James Spence Medal is awarded annually for significant contributions to paediatrics. The Royal Victoria Infirmary has renamed its lecture hall the Sir James Spence Lecture Theatre.

Three local schools were renamed after Spence in early 2011. Amble Middle School, Druridge Bay Community Middle School and Coquet High School were rebranded as James Calvert Spence College on 1 January 2011.

== See also ==
- James Spence Medal
