= World Transplant Games Federation =

The World Transplant Games Federation
- Abbreviation: WTGF
- Formation: 1978; 48 years ago / 1987 (Established); 29 June 2017; 9 years ago (Legally incorporated)
- Founder: Dr Maurice Slapak
- Founded at: England
- Purpose: Promoting amateur sport amongst organ transplant recipients and associated activities most notably the organisation of World Transplant Games events
- Headquarters: The Quay, 30 Channel Way, Ocean Village Southampton, UK
- Region served: Argentina, Australia, Austria, Canada, France, Greece, Hungary, Japan, Netherlands, Singapore, South Africa, Spain, Sweden, Thailand, England and Wales, United States
- Services: Education/training; The advancement of health or saving of lives; Amateur sport
- President: Liz Schick
- Affiliations: International Olympic Committee
- Website: www.wtgf.org

The World Transplant Games Federation (abbreviated as WTGF) is a United Kingdom-based non-profit organisation that aims to promote amateur sport amongst organ transplant recipients, living donors and donor families. The WTGF promotes the study of transplantation and aims to educate the public and raise awareness of the world shortage of donor organs. It shares new knowledge from biological/clinical studies and promotes the mental and moral improvement for recipients, living donors and donor families; and fosters international friendship and relations.

Established in 1978, the WTGF was formally incorporated in 2017 and is responsible for the organisation of World Transplant Games events, including the Summer Transplant Games and the Winter Transplant Games, both held every two years, on alternate years.

The WTGF is affiliated with the International Olympic Committee (2013 and 2021) and its headquarters are located in Winchester.

== Presidents ==
The leading executive officer of the WTGF is called the president; and since formation the following have served in this role:

Ordinal	Officeholder	Country	Term start	Term end	Time in office	Notes
1	Maurice Slapak	England	1978	2004	25–26 years	
2	Olivier Coustere	France	2004	2015	21–22 years	
3	Chris Thomas	Australia	August 2015	April 2023	7–8 years	
4	Liz Schick	Switzerland	April 2023	Incumbent		

== Members ==
60 Nations members in 1 April 2025:

1. Africa: 4
2. Asia: 14
3. Oceania: 2
4. Americas: 10
5. Europe: 30

== Events ==
Source:

== Journals ==
Since 2010.

== World Cup ==
1st Football World Cup was held in Italy in 2024 in men football and Chile was Champion.

== Calendar ==
European Heart and Lung Transplant Championships 2022 / 6–11 June 2022 / Belgium

European Transplant and Dialysis Sports Games 2022 / 21–28 August 2022 / Oxford, UK

Transplant Games of America / 29 July - 3 August 2022 / USA (San Diego)

== Games ==
=== Asian Transplant Games ===
1. 2002 Thailand
2. 2008 Iran

=== European Transplant Games ===
The 15th European Heart & Lung Transplant Championships (12-17 July 2014). Vilnius Lithuania 15 countries participating - Austria, Belgium, Bulgaria, Denmark, Finland, France, Germany, Great Britain Greece, Hungary, Ireland, Italy, Lithuania, Netherlands, Norway, Romania, Slovakia, Slovenia, Sweden and Switzerland.

16th European Heart and Lung Transplant Championships in Vantaa.

ETSC 2024 will be held in Lisbon between Sunday 21 July and Sunday 28 July 2024.

- European Transplant Sport Championships (Heart and Lung) (ETSC) or European Heart and Lung Transplant Sport Championships (EHLTC)
- European Heart and Lung Transplant Federation (EHLTF)
- European Transplant and Dialysis Sports Championships (ETDSC) or European Dialysis and Transplant Sports Championships (EDTSC)
- European Transplant and Dialysis Sports Federation (ETDSF) (Country: Ireland)

Lisbon for the first time in history (after 2016), the two Federations unite together in holding the 2024 European Transplant Sport Championships.

=== European Heart and Lung Transplant Federation ===
Members:

Games:

Games Results:

1. 1989
2. 1990
3. 1991
4. 1992
5. 1994
6. 1996
7. 1998
8. 2000
9. 2002
10. 2004
11. 2006
12. 2008
13. 2010
14. 2012:
15. 2014
16. 2016:
17. 2018:
18. 2020: Cancelled
19. 2022: Cancelled
20. 2024:

=== European Transplant and Dialysis Sports Federation ===
2000 - 2020 in Hungary / 2020 - Ongoing in Ireland

Results:

Past Results and News:

28 Members:

Board:

Statutes:

Rules:

Games Results:

1. 2000
2. 2002
3. 2004:
4. 2006:
5. 2008:
6. 2010:
7. 2012:
8. 2014:
9. 2016:
10. 2018:
11. 2020
12. 2022
13. 2024:

=== European Heart and Lung Transplant Championships ===
Participants: heart, lung and heart-lung transplant.

Sports: volleyball, badminton, tennis, table tennis, cycling, ten-pin bowling, petanque, swimming, golf, cross-country running and athletics.

Age groups (5–17, 18–34, 35–44, 45–54, 55–59, 60–64, 65–69, 70+)

Previous Games

 2024 Lisbon, Portugal [33][37]
 2022 Cancelled [37]
 2020 Cancelled [37]
 2018 Lignano Sabbiadoro, Italy
 2016 Vantaa, Finland
 2014 Vilnius, Lithuania
 2012 Apeldoorn, Netherlands
 2010 Växjö, Sweden
 2008 Vichy, France
 2006 Napol, Italy
 2004 Dublin, Ireland
 2002 Klagenfurt, Austria
 2000 Sandefjord, Norway
 1998 Bad Oeynhausen, Germany
 1996 Lausanne, Switzerland
 1994 Espoo, Finland
 1992 Enschene, Netherlands
 1991 London, Great Britain
 1990 Paris, France
 1989 Gorssel, Netherlands

=== European Transplant and Dialysis Sports Championships ===
Participants: kidney, liver, heart, lung, pancreas, bonemarrow transplant recipients, dialysis patients.

Sports: volleyball, badminton, tennis, table tennis, cycling, petanque, swimming, darts, golf, virtual triathlon, mini-marathon and athletics.

Age groups (5–17, 18–34, 35–44, 45–54, 55–59, 60–64, 65–69, 70+)

Previous Games

 2026 Arnhem, Netherlands
 2024 Lisbon, Portugal [33][37]
 2022 Oxford, UK
 2020 Dublin, Ireland [46]
 2018 Cagliari, Italy [47]
 2016 Vantaa, Finland [37]
 2014 Krakow, Poland
 2012 Zagreb, Croatia
 2010 Dublin, Ireland
 2008 Wurzburg, Germany
 2006 Pécs, Hungary
 2004 Ljubljana, Slovenia
 2002 Balatonaliga, Hungary
 2000 Athens, Greece [37]

=== MENA Transplant Games ===
Middle East Transplant Games Federation (METGF)

MESOT : The Middle East Society for Organ Transplantation

1st Middle East Transplant Games (METG) Championship in Kuwait in 2001

14th Congress of the Middle East Society for Organ Transplantation (MESOT) 10–13 September 2014.

1. 2001 Kuwait
2. 2007 Kuwait
3. 2010 Tunisia
4. 2012 UAE
5. 2014 Istanbul, Turkey
6. 2016 Egypt Cancelled
7. Next TBD

=== Latin American ===
11th Argentinean and 6th Latin American Games 2012 250 people from 7 nations

2014 Transplant Games of America (TGA) inaugural 5K event.

=== USA ===
USA Games

== Medals ==
=== 2016 ===
==== EHLTC (ETSC) ====
Rank	NOC	Gold	Silver	Bronze	Total
1	Great Britain	41	20	10	71
2	Netherlands	26	10	6	42
3	Finland	21	12	3	36
4	Austria	20	8	7	35
5	Sweden	17	9	6	32
6	Ireland	14	5	6	25
7	Denmark	11	6	2	19
8	Norway	8	4	5	17
9	Germany	7	5	2	14
10	Greece	6	6	5	17
11	Bulgaria	5	6	1	12
12	France	5	3	4	12
13	Belgium	3	2	0	5
14	Italy	1	3	0	4
15	Switzerland	1	0	1	2
Totals (15 entries)		186	99	58	343

==== ETDSC (EDTSC) ====
Rank	NOC	Gold	Silver	Bronze	Total
1	Finland	38	38	28	104
2	Hungary	35	32	28	95
3	Great Britain	31	20	13	64
4	Germany	25	16	23	64
5	Ireland	20	18	19	57
6	Poland	17	14	20	51
7	Greece	10	5	7	22
8	Italy	5	13	5	23
9	France	5	8	6	19
10	Slovenia	5	5	11	21
11	Spain	5	3	10	18
12	Romania	5	1	2	8
13	Netherlands	4	7	3	14
14	Portugal	4	2	5	11
15	Czech Republic	3	7	1	11
16	Denmark	3	5	2	10
17	Austria	2	4	6	12
18	Norway	2	2	2	6
19	Switzerland	2	1	0	3
20	Belgium	1	6	5	12
21	Slovakia	1	2	2	5
22	Sweden	0	4	4	8
23	Cyprus	0	2	4	6
Totals (23 entries)		223	215	206	644

=== 2024 ===
==== EHLTC (ETSC) ====
Rank	NOC	Gold	Silver	Bronze	Total
1	Great Britain	10	4	0	14
2	Bulgaria	8	2	1	11
3	France	8	1	2	11
4	Germany	5	1	0	6
5	Italy	5	0	0	5
5	Netherlands	5	0	0	5
7	Czech Republic	2	1	0	3
8	Austria	2	0	0	2
8	Spain	2	0	0	2
10	Sweden	1	1	1	3
11	Ireland	1	1	0	2
12	Belgium	1	0	2	3
13	Norway	1	0	0	1
14	Portugal	0	1	2	3
Totals (14 entries)		51	12	8	71

==== ETDSC (EDTSC) ====
Rank	NOC	Gold	Silver	Bronze	Total
1	Great Britain	133	51	13	197
2	Germany	78	47	32	157
3	Hungary	46	41	27	114
4	Poland	46	31	27	104
5	France	44	28	26	98
6	Ireland	43	22	5	70
7	Finland	38	21	22	81
8	Italy	30	15	6	51
9	Spain	29	5	10	44
10	Belgium	28	17	15	60
11	Greece	25	19	6	50
12	Portugal	20	14	13	47
13	Netherlands	19	7	3	29
14	Austria	13	10	7	30
15	Sweden	13	7	6	26
16	Norway	12	6	2	20
17	Bulgaria	10	3	3	16
18	Czech Republic	6	13	8	27
19	Switzerland	4	4	2	10
20	Slovenia	3	3	3	9
21	Turkey	3	2	2	7
22	Canada	2	1	0	3
23	Andorra	2	0	0	2
23	Denmark	2	0	0	2
25	Cyprus	1	2	2	5
26	Slovakia	1	1	2	4
27	Croatia	1	1	0	2
28	United States	0	0	0	0
Totals (28 entries)		652	371	242	1,265

== See also ==
- World Transplant Games
- European Transplant and Diabets Games
- Asian Transplant Games
- MENA Transplant Games
