= 2003 New Year Honours =

British royal recognitions

The 2003 New Year's Honours List is one of the annual New Year Honours, a part of the British monarch's honours system, where 1 January is marked by naming new members of orders of chivalry and recipients of other official honours. A number of other Commonwealth realms also mark this day in this way. These awards are presented by or in the name of the reigning monarch, i.e. Queen Elizabeth II or her vice-regal representative.

The list of honours for each year is announced on or around New Year's Day in the United Kingdom, Canada, New Zealand, Barbados, Bahamas, Grenada, Papua New Guinea, Solomon Islands, Tuvalu, St. Vincent and the Grenadines Belize and St. Christopher and Nevis. The exact dates vary every year from country to country. All are published in supplements to the London Gazette or the nation's own gazette. All awards conferred by the monarch (or her representative) some time after the date of the announcement particularly for those service people on active duty conferment is often considerably delayed.

The recipients of honours are displayed as they were styled before their new honour, and arranged by the country (in order of their date of independence from the United Kingdom) whose ministers advised the Queen on the appointments, then by honour, with grades, such as Knight/Dame Grand Cross, Knight/Dame Commander, and then divisions—Civil, Diplomatic and Military—as and where appropriate.

== United Kingdom ==
=== Knight Bachelor ===
Ribbon of a Knight Bachelor

- Alan Arthur Bates, C.B.E., Actor. For services to Drama.
- Howard Bernstein, Chief Executive, Manchester City Council. For services to the Reconstruction of Manchester and the XVII Commonwealth Games.
- Professor Clive Booth, Chairman, Teacher Training Agency. For services to Higher Education.
- Peter Alexander Burt, Executive Deputy chairman, HBOS plc. For services to Banking.
- Ewen James Hanning Cameron, D.L., Chair, Countryside Agency. For services to the Countryside.
- Ian James Carruthers, O.B.E., Chief Executive, Dorset and Somerset Strategic Health Authority. For services to the NHS.
- William Joseph Connor, general secretary, Union of Shop, Distributive and Allied Workers. For services to Industrial Relations.
- Dan Crompton, C.B.E., Q.P.M., lately HM Inspector of Constabulary, Wakefield. For services to the Police.
- Professor Alan Roy Fersht, F.R.S., Herchel Smith Professor, University of Cambridge. For services to Protein Science.
- David Eardley Garrard, Chairman, Minerva plc. For charitable services.
- Professor David Michael Baldock Hall, President, Royal College of Paediatrics and Child Health; Professor of Community Paediatrics, Sheffield. For services to Medicine.
- Graham Joseph Hall, Chairman, Yorkshire Forward. For services to Business in the Yorkshire and Humber Region.
- Ewan William Harper, C.B.E. For services to the Church of England.
- John Francis Jones, Headteacher, Maghull High School, Sefton, Liverpool. For services to Education.
- Professor David Anthony King, F.R.S., Chief Scientific Adviser to the Government and Head, Office of Science and Technology, Department of Trade and Industry.
- Archibald Johnstone Kirkwood, M.P., Member of Parliament for Roxburgh and Berwickshire. For services to Parliament.
- Alexander John (Sandy) Bruce-Lockhart, O.B.E., leader, Kent County Council. For services to Local Government.
- Professor Ravinder Nath Maini, Professor of Rheumatology and lately Head, Kennedy Institute of Rheumatology, Imperial College, London. For services to Rheumatology.
- Brian John McMaster, C.B.E., Director. For services to the Edinburgh International Festival.
- Peter Moores, C.B.E. For charitable services to the Arts.
- Derek James Morris, Chairman, Competition Commission. For services to Industry.
- Alderman James Michael Yorrick Oliver, lately Lord Mayor of London. For services to the City of London.
- John Edward Victor Rose, Chief Executive, Rolls-Royce plc. For services to the Defence and Aerospace Industries.
- Ridley Scott, Director and Producer. For services to the British Film Industry.
- Peter Michael Stothard, lately Editor, The Times. For services to the Newspaper Industry.
- Professor John Macqueen Ward, C.B.E., Chairman, Scottish Qualifications Agency. For services to Public Life in Scotland.
- Nicholas George Winton, M.B.E. For services to humanity, in saving Jewish Children from Nazi-occupied Czechoslovakia, 1938–39.

=== Order of the Bath ===
Ribbon of the Order of the Bath

==== Knight Commander of the Order of the Bath (KCB) ====
- Air Marshal Joseph Charles French, C.B.E., Royal Air Force.
- Edmund Nigel Ramsay Crisp, Chief Executive, Department of Health and National Health Service.
- Gerald Finbar Loughran, lately Head, Northern Ireland Civil Service.
- The Right Honourable Sir Robin Berry Janvrin, K.C.V.O., C.B. For services as H.M. The Queen's Private Secretary, including the Golden Jubilee Celebrations.

==== Companion of the Order of the Bath (CB) ====
Military Division:

- Rear Admiral Anthony Knox Dymock.
- Rear Admiral Nigel Charles Forbes Guild.
- Major General David Shrimpton Jolliffe, Q.H.P., late Royal Army Medical Corps.
- Major General David Leslie Judd, late Corps of Royal Electrical and Mechanical Engineers.
- Major General Anthony Peter Grant Peterkin, O.B.E., late Queen's Own Highlanders.
- Air Vice-Marshal Peter John Scott, Royal Air Force.
- Air Vice-Marshal John Weeden, Royal Air Force.

Civil Division:

- John Alan Barker, director, Recruitment and Development, Cabinet Office.
- David Anthony Hartnett, Policy and Technical Director General, Inland Revenue.
- Martin John Hemming, director, Defence Advisory Division, Treasury Solicitor's Department.
- Alistair William Carnegie Keddie, lately Acting Director General, Innovation Group, Department of Trade and Industry.
- John Earle Kidgell, lately Head, Economic Statistics Directorate, Office for National Statistics.
- Peter Derek James Makeham, Director General, Finance and Analytical Services, Department for Education and Skills.
- Professor Paul James Mason, F.R.S., lately Chief Scientist, Meteorological Office.
- Geoffrey John Freeman Podger, Chief Executive, Food Standards Agency.
- Gillian Stewart, lately Head, Children and Young People's Group, Scottish Executive.
- Maurice Storey, Chief Executive, Maritime and Coastguard Agency, Department for Transport.
- Anna, Mrs Walker, Director General, Land Use and Rural Affairs, Department for Environment, Food and Rural Affairs.
- Kevin Charles Gordon White, Group Director, Human Resources, Department for Work and Pensions.
- Michael Lodwig Williams, Chief Executive, Debt Management Office, H.M. Treasury.
- Dr Richard Arthur Walton, lately Director, Communications, Electronics Security Group, GCHQ.

=== Order of St Michael and St George ===
Ribbon of the Order of St Michael and St George

==== Knight Grand Cross of the Order of St Michael and St George (GCMG) ====
- Sir Jeremy Quentin Greenstock, K.C.M.G., UK Permanent Representative to the United Nations.

==== Knight Commander of the Order of St Michael and St George (KCMG) ====
- David Robert Campbell Durie, C.M.G., Governor of Gibraltar.
- Professor Lawrence David Freedman, C.B.E. For services to strategic studies.
- Christopher Owen Hum, C.M.G., H.M. Ambassador, Beijing.
- David Christopher Andrew Madden, C.M.G., H.M. Ambassador, Athens.
- Peter James Torry, H.M. Ambassador, Madrid.
- Philip Beverley Watts, Chairman of Shell Group. For services to British business and to the World Business Council for Sustainable Development.

==== Companion of the Order of St Michael and St George (CMG) ====
- Robert Montagu Graham-Harrison, Head of Office, India, Department for International Development.
- Philip Hills. For services to Export Finance Banking.
- John Hodges, lately Chief Engineering Adviser, Department for International Development.
- William Eric Peacock, Chief Executive, Business Link Hertfordshire. For services to International Trade.
- Geoffrey Doyne Adams, H.M. Consul-General, Jerusalem.
- Dr Nicola Mary Brewer, Director-General for Regional and International Affairs, Department for International Development.
- Dr Andrew Gerard Coyle, director, International Centre for Prison Studies, King's College.
- Mark Justin Lyall Grant, Director for Africa, Foreign and Commonwealth Office.
- Dr John Jenkins, L.V.O., H.M. Ambassador, Rangoon.
- Albert Norman King, L.V.O., O.B.E., Counsellor, British High Commission, New Delhi.
- Peter David Marshall, O.B.E., lately Head of Forensic Seismic Group, Atomic Weapons Establishment, Aldermaston.
- Stephen John O'Flaherty, Counsellor, Foreign and Commonwealth Office.
- David Francis Roberts, lately Deputy Director-General for Agriculture, European Commission.

=== Royal Victorian Order ===
Ribbon of the Royal Victorian Order

==== Knight Commander of the Royal Victorian Order (KCVO) ====
- Thomas Andrew Shebbeare, C.V.O., Chief Executive Officer, The Prince's Trust.

==== Commander of the Royal Victorian Order (CVO) ====
- Miss Julia Charity Cleverdon, C.B.E., Chief Executive, Business in the Community.
- James Gee Pascoe Crowden, J.P., formerly Lord Lieutenant of Cambridgeshire.
- Philippa, Mrs De Pass, Lady in Waiting to The Queen.
- Ian Redgrave Lawson, formerly Trustee, The Outward Bound Trust.
- Miss Suzanne Catharine Marland, L.V.O., formerly Deputy Private Secretary to The Duke and Duchess of Gloucester.

==== Lieutenant of the Royal Victorian Order (LVO) ====
- Meriel, Mrs Afia, Extra Lady in Waiting to Princess Alexandra, the Honourable Lady Ogilvy.
- Dr Ian Keith Campbell, Apothecary to the Royal Household, Sandringham Estate.
- Stephen Ingleby Cawley, Director of Finance, Property Services.
- Paul Frederick Goddard, M.V.O., Clerk to the Lieutenancy of Greater Manchester.
- Ian Roy Marks, C.B.E., Chairman, The Prince of Wales's Foundation for Integrated Health.
- Marcus James O'Lone, Land Agent, Sandringham Estate.
- Gillian, Mrs Shirazi, Deputy Secretary General, The Duke of Edinburgh's Award International Association.

==== Member of the Royal Victorian Order (MVO) ====
- John Barrand, Senior Property Officer, Buckingham Palace.
- Robert George Crouch, Bargemaster to The Queen.
- Paul Davies, Senior Property Officer, Windsor Castle.
- David Dorey, The Dean's Verger, Westminster Abbey.
- Brian William Fairweather, Head of Security, Palace of Holyroodhouse.
- Margaret Eleanor, Mrs Hammond, Secretary to The Princess Royal.
- Elizabeth Rosemary, Mrs Sinclair, Secretary, Office of Princess Alexandra, the Honourable Lady Ogilvy.
- Miss Maureen Ann Stevens, Personal Assistant to the Ladies in Waiting to The Queen.
- Inspector John Anthony James Walsh, Royalty Protection Department, Metropolitan Police.
- Tracy Annette, Mrs Watkins, Clerk, Central Chancery of the Orders of Knighthood.
- Constable Stephen James Willbourne, Royalty Protection Department, Metropolitan Police.
- David Wilson, Farm Manager, Duchy Home Farm, Highgrove Estate.

=== Royal Victorian Medal ===
==== Bar to the Royal Victorian Medal (Silver) ====
- David James Benefer, R.V.M., Glass House Manager, Sandringham Estate.

==== Royal Victorian Medal (Silver) ====
- Constable David Noel Francis Betts, Royalty Protection Department, Metropolitan Police.
- Anthony Graham Bish, Craft Sign Writer, Crown Estate, Windsor.
- Richard Royston Borer, formerly Assistant Storeman, Royal Mews, Buckingham Palace.
- Gladys Patricia, Mrs Bushell, Domestic Supervisor, St James's Palace.
- Noel Devlin, Craft Auxiliary, Property Section Windsor Castle.
- Bernard Patrick John Flannery, Butler to The Prince of Wales.
- Gilbert James Harris, Senior Gardener, Clarence House.
- Peter Humphrey, Craft Fitter, Crown Estate, Windsor.
- Raymond Stanley Morrison, Gamekeeper, Crown Estate, Windsor.
- Malcolm Edwin Plumb, formerly Contract Central Heating Engineer, Sandringham Estate.

=== Order of the British Empire ===
Ribbon of the Order of the British Empire (Military Division)

Ribbon of the Order of the British Empire (Civil Division)

==== Knight Grand Cross of the Order of the British Empire (GBE) ====
- Air Chief Marshal Sir Anthony Bagnall, K.C.B., O.B.E., Royal Air Force.

==== Dame Commander of the Order of the British Empire (DBE) ====
- Professor Jenifer Wilson-Barnett, Professor of Nursing and Head of the Nightingale School of Nursing.
- Pauline, Mrs Green, Chief Executive and General Secretary of the Co-operative Union Limited. For services to the Co-operative Movement and to the development of the European Union.
- Professor Louise Napier Johnson, F.R.S., David Phillips Professor of Molecular Biophysics, University of Oxford. For services to Biophysical Science.
- Miss Elizabeth Neville, Q.P.M., Chief Constable, Wiltshire Constabulary. For services to the Police.
- Rita, Mrs Weller, Headteacher, Avonmore Primary School, Hammersmith and Fulham, London. For services to Education.

==== Knight Commander of the Order of the British Empire (KBE) ====
- Joseph Brian Donnelly, C.M.G., British High Commissioner, Harare.
- Professor John Anthony Pople, F.R.S. For services to chemistry.

==== Commanders of the Order of the British Empire (CBE) ====
Military Division:

- Commodore Laurence Phillip Brokenshire, Royal Navy.
- Rear Admiral Philip Duncan Greenish.
- Brigadier Valerie Batchelor, O.B.E. (488731), late Adjutant General's Corps (Staff and Personnel Support).
- Major General John Anthony Gamon, Q.H.D.S. (488868), late Royal Army Dental Corps.
- Colonel Charles Henry Barre Garraway (497753), late Adjutant General's Corps (Army Legal Services).
- Brigadier The Honourable Hugh Brisbane Henry Ewart Monro, M.B.E. (493053), late The Highlanders.
- Colonel Peter Roberts, M.B.E., Q.H.S. (488365), late Royal Army Medical Corps.
- Brigadier Jeremy William Richard Thorn (501064), late Corps of Royal Engineers.
- Group Captain Steven Abbott, Royal Air Force.
- Group Captain Richard Frank Garwood, D.F.C., Royal Air Force.
- Air Commodore Andrew George Walton, Royal Air Force.

Civilian Division:

- Peter Ackroyd. Writer. For services to Literature.
- Charles Lamb Allen. Chairman M2002 Ltd. For services to the XVII Commonwealth Games.
- Geoff Alltimes. Director, Social Services, Hammersmith. For services to Social Care.
- Derrick Bancroft Anderson. Chief executive, Wolverhampton City Council. For services to Local Government.
- Nicholas Hugo Baring. For charitable services, especially to Heritage.
- Peter Hugh Blackburn. President, Food and Drink Federation. For services to the Food and Drink Industry.
- Oliver Brannigan. For public service.
- Robin Shedden Broadhurst. European chairman of Jones Lang LaSalle. For services to the Property Advisory Group.
- Paul Campbell Brown. Chief executive, Commercial Radio Companies Association. For services to Radio Broadcasting.
- Ms Julia Ann Burdus. For services to Commerce.
- Hugh Carl Burnard. Head, Regional Business Services South, HM Customs and Excise.
- Ms Margaret Burns. Commissioner, Health and Safety Commission.
- Professor Michael Clarke. Lately Professor of Epidemiology, University of Leicester. For services to Public Health Medicine.
- Peter Coates. Head, Private Finance and Investment, Department of Health.
- Professor Enrico Sandro Coen, FRS. Professor of Plant Genetics, John Innes Centre. For services to Plant Genetics.
- Jonathan Cope. Dancer. For services to Ballet.
- David John Court. Lately chief executive, Office of Government Commerce Buying Solutions.
- Brian Denis Cox. Actor and director. For services to Drama.
- Alan Thomas Crane. For services to the Movement for Innovation in the Construction Industry.
- Colin Davenport. Senior Civil Servant, Ministry of Defence.
- Peter Thomas Davies. Chief executive Officer, Pera. For services to Business Innovation.
- Thomas Gerald Reames Davies. Chairman, Wales Youth Agency. For services to Young People and to Rugby in Wales.
- Andrew Christopher King Day, QC. Lately Deputy bailiff of Guernsey. For services to the Crown in Guernsey.
- Mrs Gloria Hedley-Dent. Divisional manager, Planning Legal Group, Office of the Deputy Prime Minister.
- David Robbie Dickson. Lately head, Animal Health and Welfare Division, Scottish Executive.
- Frances Done. Chief executive, Manchester 2002. For services to the XVII Commonwealth Games.
- Professor Laurence Eaves, FRS. Lancashire-Spencer Professor of Physics, University of Nottingham. For services to Solid State Physics.
- Clive Bruce Fairweather, OBE. Lately HM chief inspector of Prisons for Scotland.
- Michael David Kenneth Willoughby Foot. Managing director, Financial Services Authority. For services to Financial Regulation.
- James Alexander Forbes. Lately chief executive, Scottish and Southern Energy. For services to the Electricity Industry.
- Miss Rita Ann Moden Gardner. Director, Royal Geographical Society. For services to Geography.
- John William Giffard, QPM. Chief Constable, Staffordshire Police. For services to the Police.
- Miss Jane Alison Glover. Conductor. For services to Music.
- Stephen Martin John Goode. Chief Probation Officer, Derbyshire. For services to the Probation Service.
- Malcolm Grant. Lately chairman, Local Government Commission for England. For services to Planning Law and Local Government.
- Colin Ayton Greenhalgh, OBE, DL. Lately Principal, Hills Road Sixth Form College, Cambridge. For services to Further Education.
- Professor Michael John Gregory. Head, Institute for Manufacturing, University of Cambridge. For services to Industry and Business.
- Melvyn Groves. Field director, East Midlands Region, Jobcentre Plus, Department for Work and Pensions.
- Miss Heather Margaret Gwynn. Task Force manager, Cancer and Coronary Heart Disease, Department of Health.
- Professor Mary Bridget Hanratty. Head, Nursing and Midwifery Education, Beeches Management Centre. For services to Nursing.
- Donald William Hardy. Senior Civil Servant, Ministry of Defence.
- Stanley George Harrison. District Judge and president, Association of District Judges. For services to the Administration of Justice.
- Anthony Gerard Hawkhead. Chief executive, Groundwork. For services to the Environment.
- Mrs Ann Elizabeth Hemingway. Member, Driver, Vehicle and Operator Agencies' Advisory Board. For services to the Public Sector.
- Paul Henderson. Director of Science, The Natural History Museum. For services to Museums.
- Mrs Penelope Ann Hewitt. Senior District Judge. For services to the Administration of Justice.
- Mrs Suzanne Hinchliffe. Director of Nursing, Barnsley NHS Trust. For services to Nursing.
- Walter John Houliston. Chief executive, Dairy Crest plc. For services to the Dairy Processing Industry.
- Professor Colin John Humphreys. Goldsmiths Professor of Material Science, University of Cambridge. For services to Science as a Researcher and Communicator.
- Michael Thomas Humphreys. Lately Headteacher, Our Lady and St John RC High School, Blackburn. For services to Education.
- Leonard Ironside. Leader, Aberdeen City Council. For services to Local Government and to the community.
- Mrs Lesley James. For services to the Partnership at Work Assessment Panel.
- Bryn Terfel Jones. Singer. For services to Opera.
- Hywel Gwyn Jones. Lately Senior Partner, PricewaterhouseCoopers, Cardiff. For services to Business in Wales.
- Mrs Joan Jones. Director, Management and Member Services, Local Government Association. For services to Local Government.
- Tom Allan Bruce Jones. Chairman, James Jones & Sons Ltd. For services to Forestry.
- Professor Trevor Mervyn Jones. Director general, Association of the British Pharmaceutical Industry.
- Christopher George Kenyon. For services to Higher and Specialist Education.
- Charles Anthony Lawrence. Director, Wincanton plc. For services to the Transport Industry.
- Peter Julian Lehmann. Chairman, Energy Saving Trust and chairman, Fuel Poverty Advisory Group. For services to the Gas and Energy Industry and its Customers.
- Thomas Lehner. Chair, Basic and Applied Immunology, University of London. For services to Oral Immunology and Dental Health.
- Ms Janet Lowe. Principal, Lauder College. For services to Further Education.
- Peter Royston Male. Chief executive, Blackpool, Fylde and Wyre Hospitals NHS Trust. For services to the NHS.
- Mrs Louise Livingstone Martin. Chairman, Commonwealth Games Council for Scotland. For services to the Commonwealth Games.
- Robin Charles Masefield. For public service.
- Robert Milligan McCracken. For public service.
- Mrs Mary Christina McFarlane. Director, Nursing and Patient Care, Stoke Mandeville Hospital. For services to the NHS.
- William Pollock McLaren, OBE. For services to Sports Broadcasting.
- Mrs Linda Jane Andrews McTavish. Principal, Anniesland College. For services to Further Education.
- Michael Metcalfe. Principal Inspector, Inland Revenue.
- Robert Sydney Murray. For services to Sunderland Football Club and to the community.
- Paul Myners. For services to Innovation in the Financial Sector.
- Perry Richard Nove, QPM. Lately commissioner, City of London Police. For services to the Police.
- Professor David Raymond Owens. Director, Diabetes Research Unit, College of Medicine, University of Wales. For services to the NHS, particularly in the Field of Diabetes.
- Professor Richard David Portes. Professor of Economics, London Business School. For services to Economics.
- Professor Raymond Leonard Powles. Head, Leukaemia and Myeloma Units, Royal Marsden Hospital. For services to Haemato-Oncology.
- Professor Trevor James Powles. Consultant Medical Oncologist, Royal Marsden Hospital. For services to Oncology.
- John Alun Vaughan Pritchard. Lately chief Scientific Adviser, National Assembly for Wales.
- David Anthony Quarmby. Chairman, British Tourist Authority.
- Robert Stanley Raine. Head, Commonwealth Games Division, Department for Culture, Media and Sport.
- Miss Wendy Anne Jopling Ramshaw, OBE. Designer. For services to Art.
- James Tootle Reason. For services to Reducing the Risk in Healthcare.
- Geoffrey Rees. Headteacher, Ivybridge Community College, Devon. For services to Education.
- Professor Teresa Lesley Rees. Professor, Social Sciences, University of Cardiff. For services to Higher Education and to Equal Opportunities.
- Ian Cleland Ritchie. Board Member, Scottish Enterprise. For services to Enterprise and Learning.
- Mrs Maureen Gowran Rooney, OBE. National Women's Officer, Amalgamated Engineering & Electrical Union. For services to Industrial Relations.
- David Ryan. Circuit Administrator, Western Circuit, Lord Chancellor's Department.
- Anya (Linden), Lady Sainsbury. For services to Arts Education and Ballet.
- Michael Joseph Saunders. Director, Consumer Affairs, OFWAT. For services to the Water Industry.
- Khvaja Kabiroddin Shaikh. Lately director of Education, Bournemouth Local Education Authority. For services to Education.
- Ms Jo Shapcott. Poet. For services to Literature.
- Andreas Whittam Smith. Lately president of the British Board of Film Classification. For services to the Film Industry.
- Terence Smith. Senior Civil Servant, Ministry of Defence.
- John Henry Fryer-Spedding, OBE, DL. Chairman, Cumbria Community Foundation. For services to the community in Cumbria.
- Ms Victoria Stark. Chief executive, Look Ahead Housing and Care. For services to Homeless People in London.
- Brian Styles. Principal, City of Bristol College. For services to Further Education.
- Richard Graham Tait. Lately Editor-in-chief, Independent Television News. For services to News Broadcasting.
- Professor Anthony John Newman Taylor, OBE. For services to the Industrial Injuries Advisory Council.
- Professor John Tiley. Professor, Law of Taxation, University of Cambridge. For services to Tax Law.
- Professor Elisabeth Trimble. Professor of Clinical Biochemistry, Queen's University, Belfast. For services to Pathology.
- Winifred Letitia, Lady Tumim, OBE. For services to the Voluntary Sector.
- Edward Brice Wilson. Chairman, Ulster Carpet Mills Ltd. For services to Business and to the community in Northern Ireland.
- Andrew William Graham Wylie. Co-Founder and managing director, Sage Group plc. For services to the Software Industry.
- Graham Robert Wynne. Chief executive, Royal Society for the Protection of Birds. For services to Nature Conservation.

Diplomatic Service and Overseas List

- Professor Geoffrey Bownas. For services to Japanese studies and to UK-Japanese relations.
- Richard Anthony Neil Crompton. Chargé d'Affaires, Tehran.
- Dr Geoffrey Dean. For services to medical research.
- Professor Anthony Edward Jones. For services to the promotion of British art in the USA.
- Bishop David Leake. Lately Anglican Bishop of Argentina. For services to the local and British communities in Argentina.
- David Erroll Prior Palmer. For services to newspaper publishing and British business interests in Ireland.

==== Officers of the Order of the British Empire (OBE) ====
Civil Division:

- Mrs Julie Karen Acred, Chief Executive, Southern Derbyshire Acute Services NHS Trust. For services to the NHS.
- David Colin Andrews, Consultant, Careers Education and Guidance. For services to Careers Education.
- John Andrews, Chairman, Low Incomes Tax Reform Group.
- Mrs Lynda Anne Armstrong, Director, New Business Development, Shell UK. For services to the UK Oil and Gas Industry.
- The Reverend Susan Pamela Ayling, Policy Adviser, Inland Revenue.
- Stephen James Backley, M.B.E. For services to Athletics.
- Mrs Judith Stager Ramsey Barker, Adviser, London Drug Prevention Advisory Service, Government Office for London.
- Robert Bartlett, Senior Lawyer, H.M. Customs and Excise.
- Michael Francis Baughan, Chief Executive, Learning and Teaching Scotland. For services to Education in Scotland.
- Babu Singh Bawa, Councillor, Sandwell Metropolitan Borough Council. For services to the Community in Sandwell.
- Raymond Frederic Baxter, Co-Founder and Honorary Admiral, Association of Dunkirk Little Ships. For services to Heritage.
- Mrs Leonora Antoinette Beardon, Senior Teaching and Research Associate, Cambridge University School of Education. For services to Mathematical Education.
- Keith Beattie, Chief Engineer, London Underground Limited. For services to Safety.
- Clive Beddall, lately Editor, The Grocer Magazine. For services to the Food Industry.
- Professor Clifford Beevers, Professor, Mathematics, Heriot-Watt University. For services to Higher Education.
- Graham Benfield, Chief Executive, Wales Council for Voluntary Action. For services to the Voluntary Sector in Wales.
- Rab Bennetts. For services to Architecture.
- Mrs Natalie Beswetherick, Head, Physiotherapy Services, Gloucestershire Hospitals NHS Trust. For services to Physiotherapy.
- John Richard Bettinson. For services to the community in Birmingham.
- Edgar Biss, Chairman, Tellermate plc, Cardiff, South Wales. For services to Exports.
- Michael Blakemore, Theatre and Film Director. For services to Drama.
- Ms Brenda Blethyn, Actress. For services to Drama.
- Henry Blofeld, Cricket Commentator. For services to Sports Broadcasting.
- Ms Marie Louise Boden, Chief Nurse, University College London Hospitals Trust. For services to Nursing.
- Ranjit Bolt, Translator. For services to Literature.
- Roger Martin Bottomley. For services to Sport.
- Leonard James Boulton, Operations Director, Remploy. For services to the employment of disabled people.
- Edmund Thomas Bradley, lately Team Leader and Project Sponsor, Stonehenge Improvement, Department for Transport.
- Douglas James Broom, lately Head of Events and Technical Services, Central Office of Information Communications.
- Mrs Dilys Brotia, lately Headteacher, Torriano Junior School, Camden, London. For services to Education.
- Douglas George Brydges, President, International Meat Trade Association and Meat Training Council. For services to the Meat Industry.
- Anthony Malcolm Buckeridge. Writer. For services to Literature.
- Susan Mary Burge, Consultant Dermatologist, Oxford Radcliffe Hospital. For services to Dermatology.
- Victor Thomas Burgess, lately Headteacher, Elliott School, Wandsworth, London. For services to Education.
- Miss Nancy Agnes Sinclair Burnett, Assistant Chief Nurse, Royal Marsden NHS Trust. For services to Nursing.
- Mrs Stella Burnside, Chief Executive, Altnagelvin Hospital Health and Social Services Trust. For services to Health Care.
- Mrs Mary Butterwick, Founder, Butterwick Hospices. For services to the Hospice Movement.
- Mrs Margaret Cairns, lately Headteacher, Bailey Green Primary School, North Tyneside. For services to Education.
- Samuel Cameron. For services to the Shipbuilding Industry.
- Ms Georgina Elizabeth Campbell. For public service.
- Melfort Andrew Campbell. For services to Industry in Scotland.
- Stanley Bobbie Caplin. For charitable services.
- Mrs Christine Joyce Challis, Secretary and Director of. Administration, London School of Economics and Political Science. For services to Higher Education.
- David Watson Penn Chalmers, Director and Deputy Chief Executive, Dunfermline Building Society. For services to Housing in Scotland.
- Fredrick Rignold Hyde-Chambers, Director, The Industry and Parliament Trust.
- Professor John Harvey Chesshire, Chairman, EAGA Charitable Trust. For services to Energy Efficiency.
- John Coventry Chesworth, Artistic Director, National Youth Dance Company. For services to Dance.
- Professor David Geoffrey Clark. For services to Scientific Research.
- Francis John Clark, Senior Engineer, British Maritime Technology (Defence Services Ltd). For services to the Shipbuilding Industry.
- Professor John Innes Clarke, D.L., Chairman, County Durham Foundation Grants Committee. For services to the community in Durham.
- Peter Cloke, Head, Children and Young People's Team, Government Office for the South West.
- James William Close, Deputy Director, Victoria and Albert Museum. For services to Museums.
- Hugh Michael Thomas Cobbe, lately Head of British Collections, British Library. For services to Libraries.
- Nicholas Sydney Cobbold. For public service.
- Stephen Henry Cole, lately Grade B1, Ministry of Defence.
- Professor David Robert Colman, lately Head, School of Economic Studies, University of Manchester. For services to Agricultural Economics.
- Michael Cooper, Head of Minerals, Valuation Office, Inland Revenue.
- Robert Cotton, Chief Executive, British Hospitality Association. For services to the Tourism and Hospitality Industries.
- Brian George Coulter, Chief Executive, Fold Housing Association Limited. For services to Housing in Northern Ireland.
- Stuart Craig, Production Designer. For services to the British Film Industry.
- Professor Ann Rosalie David, Professor of Egyptology, University of Manchester. For services to Egyptology.
- Robert Davis (Jasper Carrott), Entertainer. For charitable services.
- Ms Fiona Dawe, Chief Executive, YouthNet UK. For services to the Voluntary Sector.
- Professor John Barry Dent, lately Principal, Royal Agricultural College, Cirencester. For services to Higher Education and Agriculture.
- Mrs Kyra Dickinson. For services to the British Red Cross Society in Northumbria.
- Alexander Ivan Donaldson, lately Head, Pirbright Laboratory of the Institute for Animal Health. For services to Veterinary Science and International Disease Control.
- Nigel Druce, Director, Social Services, Cornwall County Council. For services to Social Care.
- Thomas Peter Durie, M.B.E., G.M., D.L. For services to the community, especially to the Royal Hospital for Children in Bristol.
- Professor Tariq Salim Durrani, Deputy Principal and Professor of Signal Processing, University of Strathclyde. For services to Electronics Research and Higher Education.
- James Archibald Thomson Dyer, Medical Commissioner and Director, Mental Welfare Commission for Scotland. For services to Mental Health in Scotland.
- Mrs Alison Janet Elliot, Convenor, Scottish Churches Forum, Action of Churches Together in Scotland. For services to the Church of Scotland and Ecumenical Relationships.
- Philip Thomas Ely, Member, Legal Services Commission. For services to Publicly Funded Legal Services.
- William Samuel Huw Evans, Principal, Llandrillo College. For services to Further Education.
- David John Fawbert, lately Headteacher, The Chase Technology College, Malvern, Worcestershire. For services to Education.
- Michael John Fitt, Deputy Chief Executive and Director of Parks, The Royal Parks.
- Stuart Barron Fletcher, Chief Executive, Pembrokeshire and Derwen NHS Trust. For services to the NHS.
- Christine, Mrs. Fox, Deputy Director, Inland Revenue.
- Edward Fox, Actor. For services to Drama.
- Alan Grahame Fry, Q.P.M., lately Deputy Assistant Commissioner, Metropolitan Police Service. For services to the Police.
- William Garland, Deputy Executive Director, Community Service Volunteers. For services to Young People.
- The Reverend Gordon Gatward, Director, Arthur Rank Centre, Stoneleigh. For services to the Farming Community.
- John Robert Gillvray, Managing Director, Farrans (Construction) Ltd. For services to the Construction Industry.
- James Eric Godfrey, Chairman, Scottish Crop Research Institute. For services to Agricultural Research.
- Ms Gillian Anne Godsell, Skin Cancer Nurse Specialist, The Queens Medical Centre, Nottingham University Hospital NHS Trust. For services to Nursing.
- Timothy John Godwin, Deputy Assistant Commissioner, Metropolitan Police Service. For services to the Police.
- Carys Mair Graham, Consultant Community Paediatrician. For services to Child Protection in North Wales.
- Robert George Graham. For services to Industry and to the community.
- Mrs Anne Griffiths, City Hall Project Sponsor, Office of the Deputy Prime Minister.
- Professor Ronald McGlashan Harden, lately Director, Centre of Medical Education, University of Dundee. For services to Medical Education.
- Ronald David Harker, Chief Executive, National Association of Citizens Advice Bureaux. For services to the Voluntary Sector.
- Anthony John Harrop, Director, Social Services, Leicestershire County Council. For services to Social Care.
- Thomas Dominic Hayes, Chairman, Governing Body East Antrim Institute of Further and Higher Education. For services to Further Education.
- Anne Carolyn Hayman, Chief Executive, Foyer Federation. For services to Young People.
- Christopher Hillier, Principal Engineer, Parliamentary Works Services Directorate, House of Commons.
- Mrs Beverley Hodson, Managing Director, W.H. Smith UK Retail. For services to the Retail Sector.
- John Lewis Hudson, Chairman, Birmingham International Airport Company. For services to Industry in the West Midlands.
- Michael James Humphrey, Chief Superintendent, Metropolitan Police Service. For services to the Police.
- Ms Merillie Alison Vaughan-Huxley, National Senior Adviser, Equality and Diversity. For services to Adult Education.
- David Ivan Ibberson, Grade B2, Ministry of Defence.
- Mrs June Imeson, Leader, Hambleton District Council. For services to the communities of Great Ayton and Hambleton District.
- Mrs Avril Jean Imison, Head of Policy, Allied Health Professions, Department of Health.
- Professor Sonia Jackson, Emeritus Professor, Social Sciences, University of Wales, Swansea. For services to Young People in Public Care.
- John Christopher Urmston James, lately Secretary, Lawn Tennis Association. For services to Lawn Tennis.
- Roger Lynn James, Head of Region, Westland Helicopters. For services to the Defence Industry.
- Mrs Sarnia Madeleine Jeffery, lately Grade7, Rural Payments Agency.
- Charles Gerard Jenkins, J.P. For services to Economic Development in Northern Ireland.
- Nick Johnson, Deputy Chief Executive and Director, Social and Community Services, London Borough of Bexley. For services to Health Care.
- Christopher Edward Ilsley Jones, lately Director of Operations, British Museum. For services to Museums.
- Michael John Jones, J.P., Board Member, Occupational Pensions Regulatory Authority. For services to the Pensions Industry.
- Richard Jones. For services to Telecommunications.
- Stephen Francis Jorgensen, Headteacher, Prescot Community Primary School, Knowsley, Merseyside. For services to Education.
- Ms Hansa Patel-Kanwal. For services to Young People from Black and Ethnic Minority Backgrounds.
- Sir John Lister-Kaye, Bt., President, Scottish Wildlife Trust. For services to Nature Conservation.
- James Thomas Keating. For services to the British Limbless Ex-Servicemen's Association.
- Peter Keen, Performance Director, British Cycling Federation. For services to Cycling.
- John Frederick Kissack, lately Head, Isle of Man Civil Service. For services to the Isle of Man Government.
- Mrs Dorothy Knupfer, Executive Nurse Director, Salford Royal Hospital Trust. For services to Nursing.
- Anthony Stephen Kravitz, Chairman, General Dental Services Committee, British Dental Association. For services to Dentistry.
- William Stanley Kyte, Head, Corporate Sustainable Development Department, Powergen. For services to Environmental Improvement in the Power Sector.
- John Ladley, Head, Operational Services, Hendon Data Centre, Police Information Technology Organisation.
- Michael Neilson Laing, D.L., Managing Director, Laing the Jeweller. For services to the Incorporation of Goldsmiths of the City of Edinburgh.
- Hanif Mohamed Lalani, Chief Executive, BT Northern Ireland. For services to Business in Northern Ireland.
- Ian Alexander Lamont, Headteacher, Alva Academy, Clackmannanshire. For services to Education.
- Mrs Harinder Kaur Lawley, Head, Access Development, London Metropolitan University. For services to Higher Education.
- Mrs Doreen Delceita Lawrence, Co-Founder, Stephen Lawrence Charitable Trust. For services to Community Relations.
- Neville George Lawrence, Co-Founder, Stephen Lawrence Charitable Trust. For services to Community Relations.
- Professor Geoffrey Mark Layer, Dean, School of Lifelong Education and Development, University of Bradford. For services to Higher Education.
- Christopher Garraway Lee, Grade B1, Ministry of Defence.
- Thomas Peter Lee, lately Deputy Director-General, Takeover Panel. For services to the Financial Markets and the City of London.
- Ms Melinda Jane Frances Letts, Chairwoman, Long-term Medical Conditions Alliance. For services to the NHS Modernisation Board.
- Cantor Ernest Moshe Levy. For services to Inter-Faith Relations and to Holocaust Education.
- Professor Richard William Lowne, lately Head, Biomechanics and Injury Prevention. For services to Vehicle Safety.
- John Alexander Lowrie, Executive Director, Nottingham City Transport. For services to the Bus Industry.
- Richard Neil Lucas. For services to the Disability Living Allowance Advisory Board.
- Don Lusher, Musician. For services to the Music Industry.
- Brian William Lyus, Head, Traffic Signs Technical Advice Branch, Department for Transport.
- Professor Barbara Anne MacGilchrist, Deputy Director, Institute of Education, University of London. For services to the Education and Professional Development of Teachers.
- John Alexander MacIntyre, Team Leader, Waste Management Division, Department for Environment, Food and Rural Affairs.
- Anne, Mrs. Martin. For services to the Soldiers, Sailors, Airmen and Families Association—Forces Help in Wiltshire.
- Vincent Mathieson, Councillor, North Lanarkshire Council. For services to Local Government and to the community.
- Anthony Peter Matthews, Head, Inspection Quality Division, Office for Standards in Education.
- Harry Paul Mawdsley, J.P., lately Chairman, Magistrates' Association. For services to the Administration of Justice.
- Peter Aloysius McEvoy. For services to Golf.
- Peter Thomas McIntosh, Chairman, Thames Region of the Environment Agency's Fisheries, Ecology and Recreation Advisory Committee. For services to the Environment.
- Werbayne McIntyre. For services to the National Employment Panel, particularly its Minority Ethnic Groups.
- Alexander Lamb McLeod, lately Parliamentary Liaison Manager, Cabinet Office.
- Christopher Hugh Barnard Mee. For services to Education.
- Professor Anthony Roger Mellows, T.D., Chairman, Review of Bishops' Needs and Resources. For services to the Church of England.
- Thomas William Miller, lately Director, Food Regulatory Affairs, Whitbread plc. For services to Food Safety.
- David Morgan, Technical Expert, Novel Weapons, MBDA UK Ltd. For services to the Defence Industry.
- Richard Keith Morris. For services to Archaeology.
- Mrs Isobel Morton, District Manager, Jobcentre Plus, Department for Work and Pensions.
- David Moses, Chairman, National Steering Committee on Warning and Informing the Public. For services to Emergency Planning in the UK.
- John Graham Mumford, Director, BP Oil UK. For services to the Environment.
- Roger James Munson. For services to the Competition Commission.
- Professor Edgar Leslie Neufeld, lately Chairman, Board of Governors, Middlesex University. For services to Education and to the community in North London.
- Professor Christopher O'Brien, Chair, Governing Body, Portland College, Nottingham. For services to Further Education for the Disabled.
- Ms Elaine Anne Oddie. For services to the East of England Industrial Board.
- Nicholas Richard Otter, Director of Technology and External Affairs, ALSTOM Power. For services to the UK Energy Industry.
- Ms Una Padel, Director, Centre for Crime and Justice Studies, King's College, London. For services to Prisoners and their Families.
- The Reverend Margaret Ruth Patterson. For public service.
- Professor John Percival, lately Pro Vice-Chancellor, Cardiff University. For services to Higher Education.
- Richard Percy, Grade 7, Child Support Agency, Department for Work and Pensions.
- Adrian Tregeare Perry, lately Principal, Lambeth College, London. For services to Further Education.
- Professor Duc Truong Pham, Head of Systems Division, Cardiff School of Engineering. For services to Engineering.
- Leroy Phillips. For services to Housing.
- Peter Phizacklea, Chairman, Lake District National Park Authority. For services to the Lake District National Park and to Cumbria.
- Mrs Linda Joyce Portis, Chief Executive, Bexley Training Group. For services to Vocational Training.
- Mrs Dilys Margaret Price. For services to People in Wales with Special Needs.
- Bhupendra Raja, lately Assistant Director, Department of Trade and Industry. For services to Racial Equality.
- John Dominic Reid, Pageantmaster, Corporation of London. For services to the City of London and to the Golden Jubilee.
- Colonel John Stream Riggall, M.B.E. For services to the Soldiers', Sailors' and Airmens' Families Association in Lincolnshire.
- The Very Reverend Kenneth Joseph Riley, Dean of Manchester. For services to the community in Manchester.
- James John Kennedy Roberts. For services to People with Drug Problems in Scotland.
- John Rees Roberts. For services to Agriculture in Wales.
- Professor Dennis Ian Robertson. For services to Traffic Research.
- John Robertson, lately Area Director North, Scottish Court Service.
- James Rodgers. For public service.
- John Rowlands, Inspector, Social Services Inspectorate, Department of Health.
- Stephen Rubin, Chairman, Pentland Group. For services to Business and to Human Rights.
- Dorothy, Mrs. Salmon, Director, Koestler Award Trust. For services to the Rehabilitation of Prisoners.
- Michael Joseph Salmon, Operations Director, BAE Systems Marine Ltd. For services to the Shipbuilding Industry.
- Peter Saraga, lately Managing Director, Philips Research Laboratories. For services to Research and Technology.
- Mark Richard Sharman, Director, Help and Care. For services to the Elderly.
- Nigel Sherlock, J.P., Chief Executive, Wise Speke Stockbrokers. For services to Economic Regeneration and to community life in the North East.
- Hari Prasad Mohanlal Shukla, M.B.E., J.P., D.L. For services to Race Relations and to Community life in the North East.
- John Sienkiewicz, Head, Urban Policy, Thames Gateway Unit, Office of the Deputy Prime Minister.
- Michael Charles Simkins, lately Director, Development Services, Wrexham County Borough Council.For Public Service in Wales.
- Christopher Peter Sims, Assistant Chief Constable, West Midlands Police. For services to the Police.
- David Paul Skidmore, Secretary, Church of England, Board for Social Responsibility. For services to the Church of England.
- Alan Graham Sloan, R.D., Director, Financial and Professional Services, Court Service, Lord Chancellor's Department.
- Bryan Gilbert Smith, Chairman, United Kingdom Accreditation Service. For services to Industry.
- Clive Smith, Grade B2, Ministry of Defence.
- Ian Smith, Chief Executive, Independent Custody Visiting Association. For services to the Voluntary Sector.
- The Right Reverend Timothy Dudley-Smith. For services to Hymnody.
- Colonel Gordon William Somerville, Retired Officer Principal, Military Secretary Headquarters Adjutant General, Ministry of Defence.
- Brian Julian Evan Spicer, Director, Heritage of London Trust. For services to Architectural Heritage and to Museums.
- Christopher Richard Stein, Restaurateur. For services to Tourism in South West England.
- David Johnston Stobie, lately Chairman, Fife Acute Hospitals NHS Trust. For services to the NHS in Fife and to UK Charitable Trusts.
- Leonard Kindell Street. For services to the University of the Third Age.
- William James Holland Taylor, J.P. For services to the Agri-Food Industry.
- Miss Patricia Eileen Thomas, Partner, S. J. Berwin, Solicitors. For services to Town and Country Planning.
- John Frederick Thorpe. For services to the community in Northamptonshire.
- Samuel Robert Torrance, M.B.E. For services to Golf.
- Michael John Townsend, Chief Executive, Woodland Trust. For services to Forestry.
- John Peter Tydeman. For services to Radio Broadcasting.
- Alan William Tyler. For services to Welfare Reform.
- Philip Duncombe Riley Venning, Secretary, Society for the Protection of Ancient Buildings. For services to British Conservation and Heritage.
- Professor Colin Angus Vincent, Deputy Principal and Master of the United College, University of St Andrews. For services to Education.
- Ralph Charles George Walker. For public service.
- Mrs Judith Alison Walmsley, Police Officer. For services to the Homeless in Manchester.
- Ian Watson, J.P., lately Chairman, Board of Management, BanV and Buchan College. For services to Education.
- Jonathan Wilkes, Chief Executive, West Kent NHS and Social Care Trust. For services to the NHS.
- Heather Ruth, Mrs. Williams, Headteacher, Whitecrest Primary School, Great Barr, Sandwell. For services to Education.
- Janice Victoria, Mrs. Williams, Member, ACAS Council. For services to Employment Relations in the Health Sector.
- Roy Williamson, Chief Fire Officer, Humberside Fire Brigade. For services to the Fire Service.
- John Stewart Wilson, Head, Agri-Food Marketing Branch, Scottish Executive.
- Roland Stanley Wilson, Director and Secretary Association for Road Traffic Safety and Management. For services to the Road Traffic Control Industry.
- Mrs Susan Margaret Winfield. For services to the Probation Service.
- Ms Elizabeth Winter, Chair, British Agencies Afghanistan Group. For services to Afghanistan.
- Nicholas Hugh Winterton, Executive Director, Medical Research Council. For services to Medical Research.
- Mrs Andrea Jean, Mrs. Wonfor, lately Creative Director, Granada Television. For services to Broadcasting.
- Michael Wood, Senior Lecturer, University of Aberdeen. For services to Cartography.
- Laurence Joseph Woodman, Range E, H.M.Treasury.
- Brian Guy Woodrow, D.L. For services to the community in Bedford.
- Susan Lesley Woodward. For services to the Commonwealth Games and the Broadcasting.
- Tom Wylie, Chief Executive, National Youth Agency. For services to Young People.

==== Members of the Order of the British Empire (MBE) ====
Civil Division:

- George Granville Aaron, Nimrod Integrated Project Team Member, Turner Charles Agency. For services to the Defence Industry.
- Jacqueline, Mrs. Ager, Supervisor, The Duke of Edinburgh Awards Scheme. For services to Young People in Surrey.
- Mohammed Maniruddin Ahmad, Executive Officer, Chemicals and GM Policy Division, Department for the Environment, Food and Rural Affairs.
- William Aitken, Customer Service Manager, Inland Revenue.
- Derrick Ashton Alford. For services to the Salisbury Hospice Care Trust.
- Pauline Mary, Mrs. Allen, Area Housing Manager. For services to Housing.
- Jean Elliot, Mrs.Allison, lately Principal Teacher of Music, Wester Hailes Education Centre, Edinburgh. For services to Education.
- Miss Janet Elizabeth Anderson. For services to the British Heart Foundation and the Royal Society for the PreventionofCrueltytoAnimals.
- Margaret Patricia, Mrs. Andreasen, Senior Executive Officer, Human Resources, Department for Work and Pensions.
- John Leslie Andrews.For services to the community in Wolverhampton.
- Miss Naomi Christine Arnold, Director of Arena. For services to the Hospitality Industry.
- Jill Mary, Mrs. Aylott, Director, Disability Initiative. For services to disabled people Community in Camberley, Surrey.
- Michael John Badger. For services to the British Bee Keeping Industry.
- Ms Gloria Bailey, Manager, Publishers' Association. For services to Book Publishing.
- Noel Bakes. For services to the community of Hornsea, East Riding of Yorkshire.
- Mary, Mrs. Ballantyne, lately Adult Basic Organiser, West Lothian Council. For services to Adult Education.
- Diana Beryl, Mrs. Ballardie. For services to the Centre Pre-School, Newton Abbott, Devon.
- Cecil George Barbaro, Community Volunteer—working with Surrey Police.For services to the community in Surrey.
- Nicholas Birchall Barber. For services to the Children's Hearing System.
- Muhammad Abdul Bari, Member, Inner Cities Religious Council. For services to Neighbourhood Renewal.
- Joy Margaret, Mrs. Barnes, lately International Co-ordinator, Inland Revenue.
- John Robert Barr. For Public Service.
- William Charles Barrington. For services to the community in Oystermouth, Swansea.
- Charles Albert Bason. For services to the community in Clungunford, Shropshire.
- James Edmond Bateman. For services to Medical Imaging.
- Muriel Helen, Mrs. Beardshaw. For services to the Samaritans and to the community in Mansfield, Nottinghamshire.
- Arthur William Beattie, Religious Education Teacher, Ernest Bevin College, Wandsworth, London. For services to Education.
- Kenneth Beeken, J.P., Life President, Grimsby Fish Merchants Association Ltd. For services to the Fishing Industry.
- Jane, Mrs. Belfield, Executive Officer, Jobcentre Plus, Department for Work and Pensions.
- Hugh Bell. For services to Action Cancer.
- Barbara Elizabeth, Mrs. Bennett, Personal Secretary, H.M. Customs and Excise.
- Irene, Mrs. Bennett, Caretaker, Ballymoney Teachers' Centre. For services to Education.
- Paul Christopher James Bennett. For Public Service.
- Peter Bennett. For services to Heritage and to Education in the West Midlands.
- Susan, Mrs. Bernerd. For services to Children's Charities.
- Sheila Marie, Mrs. Bersin. For services to the communities in Halewood and Knowsley, Merseyside.
- Lincoln Beswick, Councillor. For services to community safety.
- Nerys Haf, Mrs. Biddulph, Member, OFWAT Customer Service Committee for Wales. For services to the Water Industry in Wales.
- Alan Birchall, General Medical Practitioner. For services to Primary Health Care in Nottingham.
- Alan Birchenall. For Charitable Services to the community in Leicestershire.
- Ann, Mrs. Birnie, lately First Assistant, Westerhouse Nursery School, Easterhouse, Glasgow. For services to Early Years Education.
- Gerald Edward Bisson. For services to the Royal British Legion and Ex-Servicemen in Jersey.
- William George Bittle. For public service.
- Anthony Blackburn, Commercial Services Manager, Meat and Livestock Commission. For services to the Meat and Livestock Industries.
- Terence Bernard Boden. Assistant Director, Belfast Institute. For services to Further Education.
- Florence Elsie, Mrs. Bond, Volunteer Assistant, Highfield Primary School, Plymouth. For services to Education.
- Alan Booth. Crime Prevention Officer, Nottinghamshire Police. For services to Neighbourhood Watch.
- The Reverend Theodore Reginald Bott. For services to Chemical Engineering.
- Peter Ernest Bottomley. For services to the Water Industry.
- Margaret Veronica, Mrs. Boughton, Contracts Assistant, United Kingdom Atomic Energy Authority, Windscale, Cumbria.
- Margaret, Mrs.Bowden, lately Head Receptionist, Newman College of Higher Education, Halesowen, West Midlands. For services to Higher Education.
- Wing Commander Charles Boyack (Retd.), A.F.C. For services to the Royal Air Forces Association in Devizes and the Royal British Legion, and the community in Potterne, Wiltshire.
- Donald Alexander Boyd. For services to Meteorology in Inverness-shire.
- William Boyd, Postman. For services to the community in Bellshill, Lanarkshire.
- Anthony Michael Boyer, Assistant Inspector, H.M. Fire Services Inspectorate.
- Frederick Noel Boyne, Head Porter, Robinson College, Cambridge. For services to Higher Education.
- Christine Susan, Mrs. Bradley, lately Assistant Team Manager, Highways Agency, Department for Transport.
- Ms Patricia Josephine Bradley. For services to Financial Regulation within the Financial Services Authority.
- Joseph Bragg. For services to the community in Whitehaven, Cumbria.
- Mary, Mrs. Brailsford. For services to the War Widows Association of Great Britain.
- Elizabeth Mary, Mrs. Braithwaite, Councillor, South Lakeland District Council. For services to the Local Government in South Lakeland.
- Leslie Brandon, Manager, London Underground Ltd. For services to Public Transport.
- Peter Edward Bridle. For services to Music Education in the West Midlands.
- Robert Joseph Brolly. For services to Radio Broadcasting and to Charity.
- Gail Linda Rowat, Mrs. Bromley, Education Development Manager, Royal Botanic Gardens, Kew. For services to Education.
- Miss Sybil Alexandra Brookes, Personal Secretary, Inland Revenue.
- Miss Alexa Jane Murray Brooks, Private Secretary, Radio Authority. For services to Broadcasting.
- Daphne Gillian, Mrs. Brown, Contact Co-ordinator, Cambridgeshire Constabulary. For services to the Police.
- Doris Miriam, Mrs. Cranmer-Brown. For services to the community in Tickenham, Somerset.
- John Kevin Howard Brown, Senior Manager, Northern Bank Ltd. For services to Banking.
- Peter Brown. For services to the community in Essex.
- Stanley Frederick Brown, Member, Pantand Llanymynech Parish Council, Shropshire. For services to Local Government and to the community.
- Thomas Henry Brown.For services to the Fishing Industry.
- Edwin Fraser Buddle, Manager, Croslink. For services to disabled people.
- Ms Mary Theresa Burke, Community and Tenant Representative, Notting Hill Trust. For services to Social Housing.
- Adah, Mrs. Burns. For services to OXFAM in Glasgow.
- Malcolm Butt, Administrative Officer, Jobcentre Plus, Department for Work and Pensions.
- Anthony Thomas Bywater. For services to the Caravan Industry and to Tourism in Wales.
- Major Hugh Cameron, Retired Officer 2, Ministry of Defence.
- John Cameron, Farmer. For services to the community in Blair Atholl, Perthshire.
- Michael Terence Carden. For services to Conservation of the Built Heritage in Hampshire.
- William Richard Charles Carey. For services to the St. Clement Danes Holborn Estate Charity.
- David Alan Carley, Manager, Playing for Success Partnerships Team, Schools Plus Division, Department for Education and Skills.
- Alan John Samuel Carpenter, Senior Inspector, Gaming Board for Great Britain.
- Patrick Anthony Casey, Maintenance Officer, Omagh Leisure Complex. For services to Local Government.
- Clifford Wallace Casstles. For services to the Sea Cadet Corps in Bridport, Dorset.
- Terence John Catton. For services to Young People in Barnsley, South Yorkshire.
- Vijay, Mrs. Chadha, Customer Service Adviser, Inland Revenue.
- Eric Chalkley, Crossword Setter. For services to the Newspaper Industry.
- Valerie Ellen Catherine, Mrs. Chalmers, J.P. For services to the Administration of Justice in Newcastle upon Tyne.
- Anita Susan, Mrs. Chapman. For services to Archery.
- Catherine Fiona, The Honourable Mrs. Chapman, Member, Mid Bedfordshire District Council. For services to Local Government and to the Community. Evelyn *Joyce, Mrs. Chattenton, Cleaning Hand, Shaws Launderies Ltd.
- Joginder Singh Cheema, General Medical Practitioner, Lambeth, London. For services to Health Care.
- John Cherry, Driver, University of Ulster. For services to Higher Education.
- John Maurice Childs, British Executive Service Overseas. For services to Eastern Europe.
- Om Prakash Chopra, Director, Ethnic Minority Enterprise Centre, Glasgow. For services to Community Relations.
- Andrew Christie, Co-Founder and Partner, Hessilhead Wildlife Rescue Trust, Ayrshire. For services to Scottish Wildlife.
- Gay, Mrs. Christie, Co-Founder and Partner, Hessilhead Wildlife Rescue Trust, Ayrshire. For services to Scottish Wildlife.
- Cynthia Margaret, Mrs. Clare. For services to the community in Worstead, Norfolk.
- Kenneth Claude Clark. For services to the League of Friends, Queen Mary's Hospital, Sidcup, Kent.
- David William Clarke, Mining Records Manager, Coal Authority.
- Miss Eileen Janet Clarke, Administrative Officer, Marine Office, Liverpool, Department for Transport.
- Thomas Patrick Clements, Prison Visitor, H.M. Prison Bristol. For services to Prisoners.
- Janette McKay, Mrs. Clinkenbeard, General Medical Practitioner, Edinburgh. For services to Medicine.
- David Robert Coghill, Office Scheduler, BAE Systems Ltd. For services to the Defence Industry.
- Maxie Cohen, Chair, Treasurer and Secretary, Redbridge Jewish Youth and Community Centre. For services to Young People.
- Anthony George Colborn, Senior Inspector, North Somerset Council.
- Miss Sandra Cole, lately Administrative Officer, Department of Trade and Industry.
- Edwin Arthur Coleman. Borough Councillor, Wellingborough. For services to the Local Government and the community.
- Muriel, Mrs. Colquhoun. For services to Equestrianism in Scotland.
- Terence Francis Confield, Team Leader, Lochaber Mountain Rescue Team. For services to Mountain Rescue.
- Miss Bronwen Angela Millicent Cook. For services to the St. Lawrence Church Rural Discovery Centre and to the community in St. Lawrence, Essex.
- David William Cook, Chair, Board of Governors, St. Michael's CE Junior School, Chelmsford, Essex. For services to Education.
- George William Cook, Deputy Commandant, Essex Special Constabulary. For services to the Special Constabulary.
- Colin Copeland, Premises Manager, Ealdham School, Greenwich, London. For services to Education.
- Vera Norma, Mrs. Corbett, Founder, GKN Sankey Employees' Charity Trust.
- Brian Edward Le Corre, Cleaner, Ministry of Defence.
- Frankla, Mrs. Corris. For services to Heritage in West Derby, Liverpool.
- Iris Elvina, Mrs. Costin, Station Cook, London Fire Brigade. For services to the Fire Service.
- Valerie June, Mrs. Cottam. For services to the community in Stockport, Cheshire.
- Dorothy, Mrs. Courtnell, Pre-School Manager, School of Army Aviation, Middle Wallop. For services to the Ministry of Defence.
- Rex Michael Hamilton-Cox. For services to the Royal British Legion in Somerset.
- William Coyle. Management Information Officer, East Renfrewshire Council. For services to Education.
- Denise Mary, Mrs. Cramer, Senior Personal Secretary, Home Office.
- Grace, Mrs. Croall. For services to those affected by Parkinson's Disease in Monklands and Motherwell, Glasgow.
- Ms Beverley Cruise, Senior Personal Secretary, Office of the Deputy Prime Minister.
- Joy Pauline, Mrs. Cunningham. For services to the community in Abbey Wood, South East London.
- Clifford Alexander Cutts, Constable, Metropolitan Police Service. For services to the Police.
- Keith Dainty, Chief Inspector, Nursing Homes, Sheffield. For services to Health Care.
- Robert John Dale, Supervisor, Environment Agency. For services to the Environment.
- Hugh Dallas. For services to Association Football.
- Margaret, Mrs. Dalton, Office Manager, Employment Tribunal Services, Department of Trade and Industry.
- Angela Mary, Mrs. Dangerfield. For services to Hospice Care in Jersey.
- Sheila Ann, Mrs. Davenport, Voluntary Worker, Inland Waterways Association. For services to Waterways.
- Richard Carruthers Davidson, Farmer. For services to the Rural Community in Cumbria.
- Albert Llewellyn Davies. For services to Local Government and to the community in the Cynon Valley.
- Miss Anwen Davies, Clinical Nurse Specialist in Chemotherapy, Swansea. For services to the NHS in Wales.
- Josephine, Mrs. Davies, Founder, Green Island Holiday Trust for Disabled and Disadvantaged People in Poole, Dorset.
- Miss Susan Davies. For services to Food Safety.
- Fred Davis, Chairman, Shepton Mallet Amenity Trust. For services to Local Conservation.
- George Davis. For services to the community in Radford, Coventry.
- Peter Harry Davis, Chairman, Galleon Scout Fellowship and London Scout Councils. For services to Young People.
- Sue, Mrs. Dawkins. For services to Carers in Portsmouth.
- John Deans, External Affairs Adviser, Support Industrial Partnership, BAE Systems. For services to Industrial Relations.
- Sheila, Mrs.Dear, Head Cook, Upham Primary School, Southampton. For services to Education.
- Richard John Debenham. For services to the community in Farnborough, Hampshire.
- Bernard John Dennis, Export Director, Conren International. For services to International Business Development in Wales.
- George Edward Desmond. Audio Visual Technician, London School of Economics and Political Science. For services to Higher Education.
- William James Dillon, J.P., Councillor, Lisburn City Council. For services to Local Government.
- Beryl, Mrs. Dixon, Chairperson, Bath and North East Somerset Racial Equality Council. For services to Racial Equality.
- Martin John Dodgson. For services to Deaf and Blind people in Leeds.
- Ramesh Chander Dogra, Librarian, School of Oriental and African Studies. For services to South Asian Studies.
- Angus Donaldson, Councillor. For services to Local Government in South East Wales.
- Derek Dooley, Chairman, Sheffield United Football Club. For services to Association Football.
- Mary, Mrs. Dorrington. For services to the Samaritans.
- James Doull. For services to the community in Orkney.
- Georgia Hilary, Mrs. Draper. For services to Social Security Appeal Tribunals and to the Guide Movement.
- Robert Sidney Drayton, Deputy Group Editor, Somerset County Gazette Group. For services to the Newspaper Industry and to the local communities in Chard and Ilminster, Somerset.
- George Peter Duffield, Jockey. For services to Horseracing.
- June, Mrs. Duggan, School Crossing Warden, Lymm, Cheshire. For services to the community.
- John Michael Ede. For services to the Citizens Advice Bureau in East Cornwall.
- Gillian Katharine, Mrs. Edmonds, Sub-Divisional Officer, Metropolitan Police Service. For services to the Police.
- Angela, Mrs. Edwards, Medical Secretary. For services to the NHS.
- Arthur John Edwards, Photographer. For services to the Newspaper Industry.
- Gwyneth Iris, Mrs. Ellis. For services to the WRVS in Wales.
- Peter Cardwell Elmes. For services to Historic Conservation in South Wales.
- Ingrid, Mrs. Ensor, Domestic Staff, Lambeth Palace.
- Denis Evans. For services to Industry and to the community.
- Maureen, Mrs. Fairbank, Learning Adviser and Support Worker, Hull College. For services to Special Needs Education.
- David Falconer, National Vice President, GMB Union. For services to the Trade Union Movement.
- Angela Mary, Mrs. Farrell. For services to the Cancer Research Campaign in Newton Poppleford, Devon.
- David Robert Ferguson. For services to General Practice through the General Practice Administration System for Scotland.
- Jean, Mrs. Ferris. For services to Gymnastics in Northern Ireland.
- William Finlay. For services to the Royal British Legion.
- Edward James Fisher, General Manager, Newco Products. For services to disabled people.
- Miss Julie Fisher, Founder and Organiser, Child of Achievement Awards. For services to the Voluntary Sector.
- Patricia Ann, Mrs. Fitzgerald, Governor, Athelney School, Lewisham, London. For services to Education.
- Brian Roy Fleet, Manufacturing Director, Airbus UK. For services to the Commercial Aerospace Industry.
- Michael Foley. For services to Salesbury Cricket Club, Lancashire and especially to Young Cricketers.
- Peter Foley, Process Worker, British Nuclear Fuels Ltd. For services to Race Relations.
- Harry Stewart Ford, Planetarium Lecturer, National Maritime Museum. For services to Museum Education.
- Miss Marion Ford, Data Systems Co-ordinator, Inland Revenue.
- Michael Brook-Foster, Scout Leader, Kent. For services to Young People.
- Linda Fay, Mrs. Francis, Customer Service and Resource Manager, Ordnance Survey.
- Alistair Gordon Fraser, J.P., lately Area Commissioner, Crofters Commission, North West Sutherland and Caithness.
- Jean Kathleen, Mrs. Fraser, lately Management Unit Liaison Officer and Registry Manager, Department of Trade and Industry.
- John Edward Freemantle, Rehabilitation Engineering Technician, Southampton. For services to People with Disabilities in Hampshire.
- Maud Annie, Mrs. Fricker. For services to Boutcher CE Primary School, Southwark, London.
- Miss Vera Gairns, Customer Service Adviser, Scottish & Southern Energy. For services to the British Electricity Industry.
- Philip Raymond Galbraith, Policy Manager, Scottish Fisheries Protection Agency, Scottish Executive.
- Miss Ann Patricia Gale. Personal Assistant to the Lord Mayor of London. For services to the Mayoralty and the Corporation of London.
- James Gales. For services to Blind Golf.
- Anthony Gallagher, Secretary, Association of Registrars of Scotland. For services to Registration in Scotland.
- Babu Govind Garala, Subpostmaster. For services to the community in Coventry.
- Ms Jennifer Gartland, Project Director, Thanet Basic Skills Partnership. For services to Adult Literacy and Numeracy.
- Raphael Gasson, President and Chairman, Disabled Motorists' Caring Association. For services to disabled people.
- Miss Jacquelyn Carol Gaze, Founder, Snowdrop Foundation. For services to Wolverhampton New Cross Hospital, West Midlands.
- Anne, Mrs. Gee, J.P. For services to the Administration of Justice in Shropshire.
- Elizabeth Davidson, Mrs. Gemmill. For services to the Citizens Advice Bureau in Dumfries.
- Francis George, Coxswain, Fishguard Lifeboat. For services to the RNLI.
- Abdul Ghani. For services to the community in Birmingham.
- Arsha Chitra, Mrs. Gosine-Ghosh, Senior Policy Officer, Crown Prosecution Service.
- David Leslie Giaretta. For services to Space Science.
- Judith Ann, Mrs. Gibbons, Head, Access Audit, Birmingham Local Education Authority. For services to the Education of Physically Disabled Children.
- Bryan Donald Gibson, Clerk to the Worshipful Company of Engineers. For services to Engineering.
- Rupert Gillard. For services to Blind and Partially Sighted People in Devon.
- Miss Wendy Gilroy, Customer Care Officer, Jobcentre Plus, Department for Work and Pensions.
- Susan Elaine, Mrs. Glass, Administration Manager, Goole Hospital. For services to the NHS in Goole, East Riding of Yorkshire.
- Philip Gleave, Constable, Greater Manchester Police. For services to the Police.
- Ms Tina Glover, Director, Junction Arts, the Arts and Regeneration Agency for the District of Bolsover. For services to Art.
- Patricia Anne, Mrs. Godfrey. For services to Youth Badminton.
- Miss Gertrude Joan Goldsmith, Chairman, Workers' Educational Association, Croydon Branch. For services to Adult Education in the South East.
- David Pottie Graham, J.P., D.L. Chairman, Age Concern. For services to the community in Sunderland.
- John Graham, Managing Director, York Nutritional Laboratory. For services to International Trade and the Business Community in Yorkshire and the Humber.
- Sharon Annette, Mrs. Graham, Voluntary Worker.For services to the community.
- Conrad Paul Grant, Managing Director, Mackays Ltd. For services to Industry in Carnoustie.
- Ms Sharon Jacqueline Grant, Programme Office Manager, Business Development Division, Cabinet Office.
- Edward Ernest Green, Liaison Officer, Windsor Forest and Great Park. For services to Nature Conservation.
- Howard Green. For services to the Avery Historical Weighing Museum, Smethwick, West Midlands.
- Jane Jenifer, Mrs. Green, Branch Director, The Samaritans. For services to the community in Cardiff.
- Joan, Mrs.Green, Voluntary English Nature Reserve Warden, Dorset. For services to Nature Conservation.
- Robert John Green. For services to the community in Weston Turville, Buckinghamshire.
- William Edward Greene, Function Manager, Chadwick Hotel. For services to the Hospitality Industry in Lytham St Anne's, Lancashire.
- Anthony Victor Greenwood, Chair, Board of Governors, Sir Jonathan North Community College and Lancaster School, Leicester. For services to Education.
- Barrington Ivor Guest. For services to conservation on Brownsea Island, Dorset and to the local community.
- Barbara, Mrs. Gull, Chair, Board of Governors, Maesbury County Primary School, Oswestry.For services to Education.
- Ms Grace Gunnell, Integration Manager, New Community Schools, West Dunbartonshire. For services to Education.
- Barbara, Mrs.Haley. For services to the community in Stockport, Cheshire.
- Catherine Stella, Mrs. Hall, Senior Teacher, Haxby Road Primary School, York. For services to Education.
- Muriel Hall. For charitable services through the Friends of Kent Churches Sponsored Bicycle Ride.
- John Philip Hamon, GreYer. For services to Sark.
- Ronald Hansell, Clerk, Nether Poppleton Parish Council. For services to the Villages of Nether Poppleton and Upper Poppleton.
- Ms Ashia Kate Nana Korantima Hansen. For services to Athletics.
- Ms Tessa Harding, Head of Policy, Help The Aged.
- Barbara, Mrs. Hardy. For services to the community in Wigston, Leicester.
- Patricia Anne, Mrs. Harle. For services to Dental Nursing.
- Jill, Mrs. Harrison, Chairman. For services to the RAF Mildenhall British-American Community Relations Committee.
- Olive, Mrs. Harrison. For services to Young People in St Helen's, Merseyside.
- Helen, Mrs.Hartley. For services to the community in Skipton, North Yorkshire.
- Ms Mel Hatto, Organiser, Stapleford Volunteer Bureau. For services to the Delivery of Social and Health Services in Nottingham.
- Donald Brandon Ernest Hayes, lately Chief Executive, BESTCO. For services to New Deal in Nottingham.
- Sandra, Mrs. Haynes. For services to Education within the Asian Communities in Birmingham.
- Jyoti Prakash Hazra. For services to Community Relations in Dundee.
- Miss Olga Heaven, Director, Hibiscus. For services to Women Prisoners.
- Charles Brown Hebenton, J.P., Chair, Visiting Committee, H.M. Prison Shotts. For services to the Scottish Prison Service.
- Christopher John Hern, Planning Aid Volunteer. For services to Planning in London.
- Helen, Mrs. Hesler, Chair, Easington District Association for the Disabled. For services to People with Disabilities.
- Jim Hicks, Non-Executive Chairman, Amplicon Liveline Ltd. For services to Business and to the community in Sussex.
- Margaret Patricia, Mrs. Higgins, School Crossing Patrol Officer. For services to the Community in Birchgrove, Cardiff.
- Gillian Mary, Mrs. Highley. For services to the WRVS in West Yorkshire.
- Ms Christine Hill, Founder and Chief Executive, MediCinema. For services to Hospital Entertainment.
- Philip Hilton, Joint Managing Director, East Lancashire Coachbuilders Ltd. For services to the Bus Industry.
- Frances Myrtle, Mrs. Hindmarsh. For services to Heritage in the North East of England.
- Sister Ingrid Hitchens. For services to Children in Bolton, Lancashire.
- Penelope (Nell), Mrs. Hoare, Director, Textile Conservation Centre, University of Southampton.For services to Museums and Textile Conservation.
- Ronnie Hobley, Chairman, Glasgow City Council Credit Union. For services to the Credit Union Movement.
- Donald Ellis Hodges. For services to the St John Ambulance Brigade in Radnorshire.
- Winifred, Mrs. Hodgson, Member, Stockton Borough Council. For services to Housing and Regeneration in Stockton-on-Tees.
- Peter Hodskinson. For services to The Wellspring (Stockport), for the Wellbeing of People in Need.
- David Adrian Honey, District Officer, Devon and Cornwall Constabulary. For services to the Special Constabulary.
- Mervyn John Hood. For Public Service.
- Lesley Jennifer, Mrs.Hope, Executive Officer, Child Support Agency, Department for Work and Pensions.
- Valerie May, Mrs. Hoppe. For services to Music.
- Jean, Mrs.Horner.For services to Foster Care in Leicester.
- Ivor Richard Hosgood. For services to Music in Norwich, Norfolk.
- Margaret, Mrs. Hoskings, Member, Cheriton Parish Council, Hampshire. For services to the Community.
- Maureen Beryl Howie. For services to the StJohn Ambulance Brigade.
- William Albert Thomas Hughes. For Public Service.
- Miss Priscilla Mary Louise Hungerford, Higher Executive Officer, Visits Co-ordinator, House of Lords Overseas Office.
- James Andrew Hunter. For services to Higher Education.
- Norah, Mrs. Hunter. For services to the Voluntary Sector in Croydon.
- Paul Alexander Hutchinson. For services to Education.
- Georgina Irene, Mrs. Ireland, Prison Officer, H.M. Prison Winchester, H.M. Prison Service, Home Office.
- Christine, Mrs. Jackson. For Partnership Working with the Voluntary Sector in Suffolk.
- David Ringland Jackson. For Public Service.
- Kevin Jackson, Police Officer. For services to Charity Fundraising in Derbyshire.
- Miss Margaret Hall Jacobsen, Member, Yorkshire and Humberside Low Pay Unit. For services to Employment Relations.
- John Charles Jacques, Curator, Shackerstone Museum. For services to Railway Heritage.
- Roy William Jager, lately Press Officer, Office for National Statistics.
- Philip Albert Evans James. For services to the Royal Air Forces Association in West Glamorgan.
- Ian Colin Jenkins, Divisional Officer, Metropolitan Special Constabulary. For services to the Special Constabulary.
- Christopher John Jennings, J.P., D.L. For services to the County Agricultural Society and the community in Kent.
- Rosemary Margaret (Mimi), Mrs. Johnson. For services to the Women's Voluntary Sector.
- Stephen Alan Johnson, Area Highway Engineer, West Sussex County Council. For services to the Highway Network.
- Marie, Mrs. Johnstone, Public Relations Officer, Thales Optronics Ltd. For services to the Defence Industry.
- Iorwerth Richard Jones. For services to the community in Clynnog Fawr, North WestW ales.
- Janet Patricia Mrs. Jones. For services to District Nursing Cardiff.
- Jean, Mrs. Jones. For services to the community in Bristol.
- John David Rowland Jones. For services to Local Government and to the community in Ceredigion.
- Leigh Jones. For services to Gymnastics.
- Margaret Edna, Mrs. Jones, Leader, The Duke of Edinburgh Award Scheme, Beeston, Nottinghamshire. For services to Young People.
- Robert Davy Jones. For services to Music in Wales.
- The Reverend Timothy Morris Alban Jones, Vicar, St. Andrew's Church, Soham. For services to the community.
- Elaine, Mrs. Jordan, Grade E1, Ministry of Defence.
- Dinesh Kantilal Joshi, Chairperson, Edinburgh Lothian Racial Equality Council.For services to Race Relations.
- Christopher David Joy, Constable, Gloucestershire Constabulary. For services to the Police.
- Ann Julia Dorothy, Mrs. Justice. For services to the Construction Industry.
- Daniel Katz. For Charitable Services, especially to the Arts and the Tourette Syndrome (UK) Association.
- Christos Kavallares, Chair, Haringey Race Equality Council. For services to Race Relations.
- Finbar Kelleher, Caterer, H.M. Prison Wakefield, H.M. Prison Service, Home Office.
- Anne, Mrs. Kennedy. For services to Homeless People in Glasgow.
- Thomas William Kent. For services to the Far East Prisoners of War Association in London.
- Kathleen Betty, Mrs. Kenyon. For services to the community and charities in Lancaster.
- Greta Ann, Mrs. Kerby. For services to the Friends of Sunderland Health Services.
- Gay Sandra, Mrs. Kettle. For services to Dental Therapy.
- Mohammad Salas Khan. For services to community relations in Swindon.
- Mohammed Abdul Hafeez Khan, Team Leader, Counsel Nominations and Fees, H.M. Customs and Excise.
- Robert Douglas Kidd. For services to the Royal Air Force's Association in Edinburgh.
- Thomas Edward Kilgore, Team Volunteer, Mourne Mountain Rescue. For services to Mountain Rescue.
- Trevor King, National Park Ranger, North York Moors.For services to the community in the Esk Valley.
- Eric Harold Kinston, Governor, Pingle School, Derby. For services to Education.
- Patricia Mary, Mrs. Kirbyshaw. For services to the Tiny Tim Trust and to the National Association for Special Educational Needs, Derbyshire.
- Jeffrey Frank Kitcher. For services to Commoning and the New Forest.
- John Raymond Henry Knott. For services to the St John Ambulance Brigade in Cheshire.
- Joan Ann, Mrs. Kolasa, Administrative Officer, Human Resources Directorate, The Court Service, Lord Chancellor's Department.
- Peter Thomas Laker, Special Constable, Kent County Constabulary. For services to the Police.
- David Andrew Lamberton, Honorary Secretary, Lifeboat Station, Whitstable, Kent. For services to the RNLI.
- Ms Alison Lapper, Artist. For services to Art.
- Patrick John Carol Larner, Chairman, Hightown Praetorian Housing Association. For services in St Albans, Hertfordshire.
- June Susan, Mrs. Lawrie. For services to the Winged Fellowship Trust.
- Gordon John Lawson, Driver, Horticulture Research International.
- Miss Janet Margaret Lee, Administrative Officer, Jobcentre Plus, Department for Work and Pensions.
- Elvin William David Leech. For public service.
- David Legge. For services to the community in Kent.
- Samson Kim Lester. For services to the community in Manchester.
- Diane Jane, Mrs. Lethbridge, Chief Executive, Taste of the West Regional Food Group. For services to the Food Economy in South West England.
- Barbara, Mrs. Lindsay, Career Development Adviser, Department of Trade and Industry.
- Deryk Lister. For services to the British Limbless Ex- Servicemen's Association in Huddersfield.
- Janice, Mrs. Lloyd. For services to the community in Bury, Lancashire.
- Peggy Ann, Mrs.Long, Traffic Warden, Thames Valley Police. For services to the Police.
- Daphne Home, Mrs. Lorimer, Chair, Orkney Archaeological Trust. For services to Scottish Archaeology.
- Elsie Kathleen, Mrs. Loughran. For public service.
- Lilian Rose, Mrs. Lovelock. For services to Retinal Screening.
- Miss Joan Lowery, Nurse. For services to the Health Service in Jersey.
- Basil George Lowman, Special Adviser, Scottish Agricultural College. For services to the Beef Industry.
- Stella, Mrs. Lucas, J.P. For services to the Jewish Community in London.
- Alistair Macdonald, J.P., Councillor. For services to Local Government and to the community in Clydebank.
- James William Gordon Macgregor, lately Senior Manager, Education Service, Fife Council. For services to Education.
- Anne, Mrs. Mackintosh, Manager, JobcentrePlus, Department for Work and Pensions.
- Ronald Maclellan, lately Area Assessor (Arisaig and Moidart), Crofters Commission. For services to Crofting.
- Thomas Anthony Maguire. For services to the community in Castlederg, County Tyrone.
- Leslie William Manasseh, TUC General Council Member. For services to Employment Relations in the Telecommunications Sector.
- June, Mrs. Mann, lately Typist, Scottish Prison Service.
- Maureen, Mrs. Marfani. For services to the Pakistani Resource Centre.
- Ian John Marks, J.P. For services to the community in Great Barr, Birmingham.
- Lieutenant Colonel Arthur Nettleship Marshall, T.D. For services to Priory School, Southsea, Hampshire.
- Paula Mary, Mrs. Martin, Transport Manager, Bridge Accessible Transport. For services to Community Transport.
- William Herbert Masefield, Chair, Friends of Ledbury Hospital. For services to Health Care in Ledbury, Herefordshire.
- Ms Joan Mason, Founding Chair, Association for Women in Science and Engineering (AWiSE). For services to Women in Science.
- John Mason. For services to the Sea Cadet Unit in Wallasey.
- Walter Stanley Matchett. For services to Photo Journalism.
- Margaret, Mrs. Maxwell. For services to Equestrian Sport.
- Margaret, Mrs. McAlpine. For services to Northern Ireland Cancer Fund for Children.
- Hugh McCann. For services to the community in Wishaw, Lanarkshire.
- Rosemary, Mrs. McCarton. For services to the community in Monsall, Manchester.
- Andrew Price McConaghy, Councillor, Moyle District Council. For services to Local Government.
- Cyrus McCormick. For public service.
- Alistair McCowan. For services to the Applecross Community, Strathcarron, Ross-shire.
- William McCreadie, Lockkeeper, Eynsham, Oxfordshire. For services to the River Thames and to the community.
- Miss June Alison Alexandra McCulloch. For services to the Royal Air Force Association in East Sussex.
- Miss Susan McDonald. For services to Cernach Housing Association.
- Thomas Whigham McDougall, Inspector, Central Scotland Police. For services to the Police and to the community in Falkirk and Stirling.
- Edward McGarrell, Volunteer, British Red Cross Scotland. For services to the British Red Cross.
- Margaret, Mrs. McInnes, Programme Centre Leader, Lauder College. For services to Unemployed People In Lanarkshire.
- Richard Fraser McIntosh, J.P. For services to Local Government in Forres, Moray.
- Noel McKee. For services to charities in Northern Ireland.
- Patrick Joseph McKeever. For services to Young People in Belfast.
- Robert Bayne McKinnon, lately Retained Station Officer, Tayside Fire Brigade. For services to the Fire Service.
- Clare, Mrs. McManus. For services to Wood End Community Centre, Coventry, West Midlands.
- Derek Leslie Beatson McNaught. For services to the St Andrews Ambulance Association, Edinburgh.
- Mary McQueen, Mrs. Megan, lately Teacher-in-Charge, Loatland Primary School Nursery Unit, Desborough, Northamptonshire. For services to Early Years Education.
- Peter Kaye Menhennet. For services to the Leukaemia Research Fund in Nottingham.
- Anne, Mrs. Middleton, lately Deputy Scottish Secretary, UNISON. For services to the Trade Union Movement.
- Miss Mary Louise Miles. For services to the community in Worcestershire.
- Ashley Miller, J.P., Executive Officer, Child Support Agency, Department for Work and Pensions.
- Herman Miller, Site Security Officer and Caretaker, Canterbury College. For services to Further Education.
- Philip Aaron Miller, Chief Executive, Adventure Island and Sea Life Adventure. For services to the community in Southend-on-Sea, Essex.
- William Millett, Chair, Mackwest Tenants' Association. For services to the community.
- Eileen Rennie, Mrs. Milne, Co-ordinator, Good Neighbour Network, Livingston. For services to the community in West Lothian.
- Professor John Alexander Milne, Deputy Director, Macaulay Land Use Research Institute. For services to Agriculture and the Environment.
- Barbara Annette Stacey, Mrs. Minta. For services to the community in Guernsey.
- Miss Jean Scott Mitchell. For services to Equestrian Sport.
- Roy Mitchell, Technical Manager, Thales Avionics Ltd. For services to the Defence Industry.
- William John Mockler. For services to the XVII Commonwealth Games.
- Manzoor Elahi Moghal. For services to Racial Equality and community life in Leicester.
- Ernest Hugh Moir, lately School Janitor, Strathburn Primary School, Inverurie. For services to Education.
- Captain Robert William Moland, R.N. Rtd. For services to the King George's Fund for Sailors in Norfolk.
- Commander Donald Moore, R.D., R.N.R. (Retd.) Archaeologist and Art Historian. For services to Archaeology and to Welsh Cultural Life.
- Derek George Morgan. For services to the Citizens Advice Bureau in Newcastle upon Tyne.
- Gwenneth Elizabeth, Mrs Morgan. For services to Home Care in Ross-on-Wye, Herefordshire.
- Gwenyth Mary, Mrs. Morgan. For services to the community of Magor, South East Wales.
- Robina Young, Mrs. Morrison. For services to the community in Alva, Clackmannanshire.
- Miss Lucille Janette Munro. For services to the community in West London.
- Robert John Fisher Murphy, Retained Sub-Officer, Central Scotland Fire Brigade. For services to the Fire Service.
- Rosemary Ann, Mrs. Musgrave. For services to the Heritage of Clifton and Bristol.
- Brian Leslie Myers. For services to the community in Willington, Durham.
- Judith Diana Hamilton, Mrs. Naqvi, Branch Librarian. For services to the Public Library in Finaghy, Belfast.
- John Frederick Neale. For services to Conservation and to the community in Chaldon, Surrey.
- Archibald Nelson. For public service.
- Yvonne, Mrs. Nelson. For services to the Fortune Centre of Riding Therapy, Christchurch, Dorset.
- Bridie, Mrs. Nesbitt, Cleaner. For services to the Department of Employment and Learning, Northern Ireland.
- Geoffrey Roland Newey, Clockmaker. For services to Horology in York.
- David William Nicholas, Special Adviser, Business Link Wessex. For services to Business.
- Hugh Nicholl. For services to the community and to Rural Development in Northern Ireland.
- Thomas Harold Nicholson, Owner and Managing Director, T. H. Nicholson. For services to the Northern Ireland Fishing Industry.
- Eyo Ita Eyo Nkune, Chairman, Grahame Park Residents Association. For services to the London Borough of Barnet.
- Alan Noble, Adult Education and Lifelong Learning Officer, Buckinghamshire. For services to Adult and Community Education.
- Nadia, Mrs.Noble, Senior Messenger, Department for International Development.
- Norman John Noble, lately Traffic Warden and Civilian Driver, Hampshire Constabulary. For services to the Police.
- Robert Noble, lately Borders Area Secretary, National Farmers Union Scotland. For services to Agriculture in Scotland.
- Roger Nock. For services to the community in Brechfa, Carmarthenshire.
- Gillian Margaret, Mrs. Norris. For services to Young People in Tunbridge Wells, Kent.
- Nigel David Leonard Norris, Honorary Secretary, The Duke of Edinburgh Award Scheme, Plymouth. For services to Yopung People.
- William Patrick O'Reilly, Chairman, Fisheries Ecology and Recreation Advisory Committee, Environment Agency, Wales. For services to Angling and Conservation.
- Paul Hereford Oliver. For services to Architectural Education.
- John Frederick Oulton. For services to Athletics Coaching in Scotland.
- Julian Owen, Chairman, Associated Self Build Architects. For services to Architecture.
- Gordon Padley. For services to Netball.
- Kenneth Palmer, Cricket Umpire. For services to Cricket.
- Frederick Panton. For services to Aviation Heritage.
- Keith Parker, Operations Manager, Coal Authority. For services to the Coal Industry and Environmental Protection.
- Helen Kathryn, Mrs. Parsons, Higher Executive Officer, National Assembly for Wales.
- Anne, Mrs. Partington, Senior Social Worker, Dundee City Council. For services to Children.
- Mohamed Abdulla Pasha. For services to the community, especially to Health and Community Relations in Southend, Essex.
- Catherine Frances Paterson. For services to Occupational Therapy.
- Jean Annette Paton, Honorary Member, British Bryological Society. For services to Biology and Nature Conservation.
- William John Paulley, Governor, Durweston First School, Blandford Forum, Dorset. For services to Education.
- Charles William Davidson Peattie, Cartoonist and Writer. For services to the Newspaper Industry.
- David Penman. For services to Road Users in Dumfries and Galloway.
- Gillian, Mrs. Penn, Governor and Volunteer Helper, Aldryngton Primary School, Reading. For services to Education.
- Ms Lucy Perman, Executive Director, Clean Break Theatre Company. For services to Drama.
- Florence Elizabeth, Mrs. Phillips. For services to Young People in Broadway, Worcestershire.
- John Coleman Phillips. For public service.
- Greta, Mrs. Phythian, Environmental Liaison Officer, Coventry City Council. For services to the Environment in Coventry.
- Patricia Ann, Mrs. Pilkington, Co-Founder, Bristol Cancer Help Centre. For services to Health Care.
- Evelyn May, Mrs. Piska, Chairperson, Compass. For services to families and carers of mentally ill people in Portsmouth.
- Melba Ethel, Mrs. Pitt. For services to disabled young people and to the community in Henley-on-Thames, Oxfordshire.
- Andrew Pollock. For public service.
- Trevor Poxon, Assistant Chief Examiner, Institute of Advanced Motorists. For services to Road Safety.
- Jennifer Linda, Mrs. Poyner. For services to the Disability Access Charter.
- Robert Preston. For services to South Lanarkshire College.
- Feliks Puczylowski. For services to Polish ex-Servicemen and Women.
- Ronald Purbrick. For services to Foster Care in Lambeth, London.
- Sheila Purbrick. For services to Foster Care in Lambeth, London.
- John Edward Rackham, T.D., President, St Mary's Centre. For services to the community in Lichfield, Staffordshire.
- Mary Anthea, Mrs.Rackham, Governor, Sidegate Primary School, Ipswich. For services to Education.
- Elizabeth Mackie Dickson, Mrs. Rae. For services to Nursing.
- Inthirasingam Rajah, lately Senior Audit Assistant, Oxfordshire County Council.
- Shanthi Kumar Rasaratnam, Programme Manager, United Utilities. For services to the Water Industry.
- Samuel Brian Rea, J.P. For services to the Community.
- Sarah Agnes, Mrs. Rea, Caretaker, Moorfields Primary School, Ballymena. For services to Education.
- Susan Margaret Read, Fellow, Royal College of Nursing. For services to Innovation and Health Care.
- Alan Reid, Chairman. For services to Kaleidoscope Youth Club, Blackburn, Lancashire.
- Hugh Watt Reid, lately Head, Virology Division, Moredun Research Institute. For services to Animal Health and Disease Control.
- Mary Elizabeth, Mrs. Reid. For services to Housing and the Tenants' Movement.
- William Henderson Renton, Project Controls Manager, BAE Systems Marine Ltd. For services to the Defence Industry.
- Christine, Mrs.Richardson, lately Midwifery Sister and Supervisor of Midwives, Borders General Hospital. For services to Nursing and Midwifery.
- Kevin John Richmond, Lecturer, Abingdon and Witney College, Oxfordshire. For services to Further Education.
- Philip Charles Riggs. For services to the community in Stokeinteignhead, Devon.
- James Castles Rippey. For services to the Association for Spina Bifida and Hydrocephalus.
- John Ritchie. For services to Conservation and the National Trust.
- Robert Roberts. For services to the community in Newham, East London.
- Gillian, Mrs. Robertson. For services to Girlguiding in Scotland.
- Veronica, Mrs. Rodden, Chair, North Glasgow Community Forum. For services to the Community.
- George Ross, lately Secretary and Treasurer, St Andrews Association, Aberdeen. For services to the St Andrews Ambulance Association.
- Carole Ann, Mrs. Round, Local Housing Manager, Frankley Estate, Birmingham. For services to Local Government and Housing in Birmingham.
- Donald Cyril Wesley Rouse. For services to the community in Bampton, Oxfordshire.
- Elizabeth Jane, Mrs. Rowe. For services to the community in Garstang, Lancashire.
- Ms Susan Mary Ryrie, Manager, Brook Advisory Centre, Liverpool. For services to Young People.
- Derek John Sargent, lately Honorary Secretary, Lifeboat Station, Weymouth. For services to the RNLI.
- David Raymond Saunders. For services to Wildlife Conservation in Wales.
- Wilfred Gordon Saunders, Violin Maker.
- John Alexander Savage, Constable, Metropolitan Police Service. For services to the Police.
- Barbara Veronica, Mrs. Sawyer, Technician, London School of Hygiene and Tropical Medicine. For services to Research and Higher Education.
- Miss Christina Scott. For services to the community in St Monans, Fife.
- Mohammed Shaffi, Director, Edinburgh Mela. For services to the Arts.
- Paul Anthony Shenton, lately Chairman, Society of Chiropodists and Podiatrists. For services to Podiatry.
- Gavton Othman Dirsley Shepherd. For services to Community Relations in South London.
- James Joseph Sheridan, Director of Services, South East Region. For services to the Royal College of Nursing.
- Mary Esther, Mrs. Sillibourne. For services to Young People in the Ruckinge and Hamstreet Scout and Guide Associations, Kent.
- Joyce, Mrs.Simpson, Assistant Registry Manager, Office of Science and Technology, Department of Trade and Industry.
- Annie Georgina, Mrs. Skinner, B.E.M., Domestic Staff, Lambeth Palace.
- Christina, Mrs. Sloan, Branch Librarian, Newry Library. For services to the Public Library Service.
- Margaret Agnes, Mrs. Sloan, Nursing Auxiliary, Ulster Hospital. For services to the Community.
- Roy Henry Smallwood, Bus Driver, First Potteries. For services to the Bus Industry in North Staffordshire.
- Ian Smith, Grade C1, Ministry of Defence.
- John Smith, Pot Washer. For services to the Royal Botanic Garden, Edinburgh.
- Robert Adams Sneddon, Chief Registrar, Glasgow City Council. For services to Registration in Scotland.
- Victor Spence, Treasurer, Benview and Ballysillan Tenants Association. For services to the Community.
- Robert Spooner. For Charitable Services, especially to the Story of Christmas Appeal.
- Stephen Springer. For services to Tourism.
- Saverimuthu Stanislaus, President, South London Tamil Welfare Group. For services to Asylum Seekers and Refugees.
- Allan Cameron Steele, Provost, East Renfrewshire Council. For services to Local Government.
- Samuel Steele. For services to Transport and to the Community.
- Ms Jane Stephenson, Chair, Wastewatch, and Executive Director, The Recycling Consortium. For services to Community Recycling.
- Dorothy, Mrs. Stevens, Administrative Assistant, Information Services Division, Department for Education and Skills.
- Miss Suzanne Stone, Grade C1, Ministry of Defence.
- Arthur Morton Strachan. For services to the Livestock Industry in Dunblane, Perthshire.
- Timothy John Strickland, Archaeologist. For services to Archaeology and to the community in Middlewich, Cheshire.
- Colin Michael Stroud, Chief Executive, York Council for Voluntary Service. For services to the Voluntary Sector.
- Iain Robert Sturrock, lately Senate Member, Engineering Council. For services to Business and Engineering.
- Susan Mary, Mrs. Sutherland, Senior Supervisory Assistant, Manor Field Primary School, Basingstoke, Hampshire. For services to Education.
- Cyril Swales. For services to Folk Dancing in North Yorkshire.
- Brendan Sweeney, General Medical Practitioner, Glasgow. For services to Medical Ethics.
- Ishwar Dullabhbhai Tailor. For services to Race Relations in Preston.
- Stephanie Ann, Mrs. Talbot. For services to Cardiac Rehabilitation.
- Kelvin Martin Tatum. For services to Speedway.
- Russell Philip Taylor, Cartoonist and Writer. For services to the Newspaper Industry.
- Margaret, Mrs. Telfer, Janitor and Cleaner, Carmichael Primary School, Biggar, Lanarkshire. For services to Education.
- Jean Marian, Mrs. Terry, J.P., Senior Executive Officer, Facilities Management Services, Commercial Services Division, Department for Education and Skills.
- Francis Gerald Thain. For services to Swimming and Water Polo.
- William Edgar Thom. For services to the Ulster Cancer Foundation.
- Christopher Thomas, Senior Telecommunications Engineer, Cabinet Office.
- Edward John Thomas, Secretary, Clynderwen and Cardiganshire Farmers Ltd. For services to Agriculture in South West Wales.
- Alan David Thompson, Lead Court Manager, Preston Combined Court, The Court Service, Lord Chancellor's Department.
- Beryl Joyce, Mrs. Thompson, School Crossing Warden, Derby. For services to the Community.
- Graham Franklin Thompson, Head, Science and Physics, Keswick School, Cumbria. For services to Education.
- Wesley James Thornton, Sub-Postmaster. For services to the community in Spondon, Derbyshire.
- Richard Linley Tickell. For services to Family Mediation and to the community in Wiltshire.
- Susan Jane, Mrs. Timbrell, Head of Pensions. For services to the Environment Agency.
- Martin Henry Rendell Tomlinson, Senior Manager, West Sussex County Youth Services. For services to Young People.
- Edward George Topping. For charitable services in Preston, Lancashire.
- Joan Evelyn, Mrs. Towle, J.P. For services to the community in Cornwall.
- Jeremy Pettican Tracy, Chief Tes Pilot (Canada), Westland Helicopters. For services to the Defence Industry.
- Robert John Travers, Senior Policy Development Manager, Department of Health.
- Stella Maris Treharne, Mrs. Turk, Strandings Recorder. For services to Nature Conservation, Cornwall.
- Ms Gillian Mary Turner. For services as National Co-ordinator, Creutzfeldt-Jacob Disease Support Network.
- Patricia Ann, Mrs. Vadaszffy. For services to the Citizens Advice Bureau in Dacorum, Hertfordshire.
- Ian Mervyn Vaughan. For Voluntary Services to the Homeless in Gloucestershire.
- Victor Vivian Verrier. For services to Horticulture and to the community in Somerset.
- Charlie George Vickery, Agricultural Craftsman, H.M. Young Offenders Institution Portland, Home Office.
- Vivian Arthur Vines. For services to the community in Chippenham, Wiltshire.
- Janet Mary, Mrs. Wade. For services to the community in Bradford and Craven, West Yorkshire.
- Linda Carole, Mrs. Wade, Administrative Officer, Defence and Overseas Secretariat, Cabinet Office.
- Pat, Mrs. Wade, Play Specialist. For services to the Burned Children's Club.
- Ulric Fred-Gibson Walcott, J.P. For services to Community Life and Racial Equality in Bristol.
- Ms Annette Jane Walker, Managing Director, Opportunity Links, Cambridgeshire. For services to Childcare.
- Thomas Brian Walker. For services to Health and Safety in the Construction Industry.
- William Wallace. For services to Conservation.
- Adrian James Walsh, Information Officer, Publicity Division, Department for Education and Skills.
- William Arthur Walsh. For services to the Antrim and Randalstown Multiple Sclerosis Group.
- The Reverend Canon Trevor William Walt. For services to the Chaplaincy, Broadmoor Hospital, Berkshire.
- Gerard Anthony Walters, Manager, West Oxfordshire Training Services. For services to Training and Social Exclusion.
- James Robin Ward, Grade C1, Ministry of Defence.
- Josephine, Mrs. Ward, Customer Support Programmes Manager, MBDA UK Ltd. For services to the Defence Industry.
- Martin Wareing, Councillor, Tameside Metropolitan Borough Council. For services to the community.
- Patricia Ann, Mrs. Warwick, Voluntary Cycle Instructor, Cambridgeshire. For services to Road Safety.
- Peter John Washbourn. For services to the community in Lincoln.
- David Anthony Waters, Distribution Director, Northern Electric plc. For services to the Electricity Industry.
- Miss Norma Christine Waterson (Mrs. Carthy), Folk Singer and Songwriter. For services to the Music Industry.
- Anne Jane, Mrs. Watson, Head, Jigsaw Nursery Centre, Muirhead, North Lanarkshire. For services to Early Years Education.
- Gloria Mary, Mrs. Watts. For services to People with Cerebral Palsy and their Carers in Swansea.
- Keith Richard Weaver, Team Leader, Vosper Thorneycroft UK Ltd. For services to the Shipbuilding Industry.
- Roy Webster, Director General's Staff Officer (Information and Communication), H.M. Prison Service Headquarters, Home Office.
- Mary Josephine, Mrs. Weeks, Manager, Nightingale Community Playgroup, Eastleigh, Hampshire.For services to Early Years Education.
- Henry George Barling Weir, lately Finance and Business Manager, H.M. Prison Greenock, Prison Service, Home Office.
- Irving Goldsby-West, J.P. For services to the Administration of Justice in South Yorkshire.
- Robert Leslie Westworth. For services to the Citizens Advice Bureau in Clydesdale.
- Elaine, Mrs. Whalley, Chair, Governing Body, Holywell High School, Flintshire. For services to Education.
- Barrie Whyman. For services to the community in Derbyshire and Staffordshire.
- William Allan Wilcocks. For services to Music and to the community on the Isle of Man.
- Jonathan Peter Wilkinson. For services to Rugby Union.
- Michael George Arthur Will, Chairman, Aberdeen, YMCA. For services to the YMCA.
- Dorothy Irene, Mrs. Willard. For services to Save the Children in Sussex.
- David Treherne Williams. For services to the Hotel and Tourism Industry in Wales.
- Elizabeth Jean, Mrs. Voyle-Williams, Assistant Headteacher, Queen Elizabeth Cambria School, Carmarthen.
- Geraint Williams, Headteacher, Gwyrosydd Junior School, Swansea. For services to Education.
- Joseph Williams, General Manager, University of Sunderland Students Union. For services to Higher Education.
- Raymond Leslie Williams, Constable, Essex Police. For services to the Police.
- John Williamson, Milkman. For services to the Rural Communities in Coxwold and Husthwaite, North Yorkshire.
- Maurice Williamson. For services to Young People in Bangor, Northern Ireland.
- Jane, Mrs. Wilson, Patient Information and Partnership Co-ordinator, Whittington Hospital, London. For services to Health.
- Patricia, Mrs. Wilson. For services to the community in Chelmsford, Essex.
- Peter Owen Leslie Winter, Sub Officer (Retained), East Sussex Fire Brigade. For services to the Fire Service.
- Marilyn Elizabeth, Mrs. Womack. For charitable services to Leukaemia Research.
- Ian Womersley, Constable, West Yorkshire Police. For services to the Police.
- Colonel Denis Roland Wood, Chairman of Trustees. For services to The Gurkha Museum.
- Trevor John Robert Wood. For services to sport for disabled people in Greater London.
- Stephen John Woodcock, Divisional Officer, Special Constabulary, Lincolnshire Police. For services to the Police.
- George Munro Barrington Woods, Lay Member, Further Education College Inspection Team. For services to Education.
- Angela Karen, Mrs. Wright, Creator, Crealy Adventure Park. For services to Tourism.
- Roger Wright, Grade C2, Ministry of Defence.
- Robert Anthony Wylie, Translink District Manager. For services to Transport and to the Community.
- Leonard Yeatman. For services to the HMS Ardent Association.
- Colin Richard Young. For services to Young People and the community in Cranleigh, Surrey.
- David Lester Youngs, Scientist. For services to the Defence Industry.
- Anthony George Zandona, Director, WSP Civils Ltd. For services to Highways Engineering.
- Fadima Fatmata, Mrs. Zubairu, Careers Adviser, Connexions, Manchester. For services to Young People.
- Charles Howard Zuckerman, General Medical Practitioner, Northfield. For services to the National Health Service in Birmingham.

=== Order of the Companions of Honour (CH) ===
- Sir (Gordon) Howard (Eliot) Hodgkin, C.B.E., Artist. For services to Art.
- James Ephraim Lovelock, C.B.E., F.R.S., Scientist, Inventor and Author. For services to Global Environmental Science.
- Sir (John) Denis Mahon, C.B.E., Art Historian. For services to Art.

== Barbados ==
=== Order of the British Empire ===
==== Commander of The Order of the British Empire (CBE) ====
- Fozlo Brewster. For service to the community.
- Ronald Geoffrey Cave. For services to commercial, industrial and tourism development.
- Dr. George Evelyn Mahy. For service to the medical profession.

==== Officer of The Order of the British Empire (OBE) ====
- Randolph Levenson Field. For service to sport.
- Lawrence Edwin Pollard. For services to banking religion and the community.
- Joyce Ophelia, Mrs. Thompson. For services to education and the community.

==== Member of The Order of the British Empire (MBE) ====
- Gerald Darrell Bannister. For service to music.
- Diane Cora, Mrs. Bourne-Daniel. For services to indigenous and original craft.
- Delores St. Elmo, Mrs. Worrell. For service to the community.

== Bahamas ==
=== Order of Saint Michael and Saint George ===
==== Companion of The Order of Saint Michael and Saint George (CMG) ====
- Jeffrey McDonald Thompson. For service to politics.
- The Reverend Dr. William Thompson. For service to religion.
- Franklyn Roosevelt Wilson. For service to economic and political development.

=== Order of the British Empire ===
==== Officer of The Order of the British Empire (OBE) ====
- Dr. Michael Perry Gomez. For service to the medical profession.
- Leander Claudius Minnis. For political and community service.
- Pastor Hugh Arthur Roach. For service to religion.
- Dr. Gail Saunders. For service to the history of The Bahamas.

==== Member of The Order of the British Empire (MBE) ====
- Ronald Butler. For service to the music and entertainment industry.
- Russell Eugene Franks. For service to the community.
- Paul Antony Cornard Knowles. For services to cultural development.
- Frank Garfield Rutherford. For service to sport.
- Henry Fredrick Earl Storr. For service to business.
- Mizpah, Mrs. Tertullien. For service to politics and the community.

=== British Empire Medal (BEM) ===
- The Reverend Godfrey Livingston Bain. For service to the community.
- Doris, Mrs. Burrows. For service to the community.
- Rudolph Dean. For service to the community.
- Ms Louise Green. For service to the community.
- Ena, Mrs. Hepburn. For service to the community.
- Hysel Loran Roach. For service to the community.
- Anthony Reuben Romer. For service to the community.
- Effie Doretha, Mrs. Walkes. For service to the community.
- Laura Louise, Mrs. Williams. For service to the community.

=== Queen's Police Medal (QPM) ===
- Alan Delenor Gibson, Royal Bahamas Police Force
- Reuben Simeon Smith, Royal Bahamas Police Force

== Grenada ==
=== Order of Saint Michael and Saint George ===
==== Companion of The Order of Saint Michael and Saint George (CMG) ====
- George Ignatius Brizan. For services to education.

=== Order of the British Empire ===
==== Officer of The Order of the British Empire (OBE) ====
- Morris Mathlin. For services to banking.

==== Member of The Order of the British Empire (MBE) ====
- Augustine Benedict Thaddeus Charles. For services to education.
- Geraldina Helen, Mrs. Perrotte. For services to health.

=== British Empire Medal (BEM) ===
- Ms Daul Aldrica Douglas. For services to farming.
- Norma Kathleen, Mrs. McLeish. For services to farming.

== Papua New Guinea ==
=== Order of Saint Michael and Saint George ===
==== Companion of The Order of Saint Michael and Saint George (CMG) ====
- Justice Thomas Edwin Barnett, O.B.E. For service to the judiciary.
- Robert Igara. For service to the government of Papua New Guinea.

=== Order of the British Empire ===
==== Officer of The Order of the British Empire (OBE) ====
- Laura Josephine, Mrs. Martin. For services to business, politics and the community.
- Mathias Umba Merimba. For services to business commerce and charity.
- David Tauaole. For public service.

==== Member of The Order of the British Empire (MBE) ====
- The Reverend Janacdabing Apo. For services to religion and the community.
- Cedric Man Ching Chee. For service to the aviation industry.
- Raymond Chin. For services to the music industry.
- Donald John Daniels. For service to education.
- Rungwa Koimbonga. For service to the development and expansion of the Lutheran Church, Western Highlands Province.
- Councillor Koitago Mano. For service to the community.
- Neil John McIntre. For services to commerce and the forestry sector.
- Ricky Mitio. For service to the coVee industry. Constable Bill Tali. For public service.
- Randhir Varma. For services to sports and business.
- Salatiel, Mrs. William. For service to the community.

==== Imperial Service Order (ISO) ====
- Dr. Isaac Naason Ake. For services to health.

=== British Empire Medal (BEM) ===
- Ms Aileen Aisi. For service to the Bank of Papua New Guinea.
- Timothy Akia. For services to the National Broadcasting Corporation.
- Ruben Audo Dowaki. For public service.
- Tov Gwerren. For service to the airline industry.
- Livingston David Hesaboda. For public service.
- Mark Kanawi. For service to the Royal Papua New Guinea Constabulary.
- Sege Kandu. For public service.
- Peter Kansunga. For service to health.
- Kelly Kewa. For services to the development of rural health services.
- Richard Crockett Knoxs. For services to the petroleum industry.
- Nasain Livuana, Mrs. Kunai. For service to the Bank of Papua New Guinea.
- Anton Leslie. For service to the Health Department.
- Correctional Sergeant Major Pius Malinga. For services to the correctional services.
- Lakoko Mola. For service to education.
- Paul Pogo Nime. For service to the community.
- Ms Rose Porowai. For service to education.
- Laho Karukuru Saea. For public service.
- Noie Uragle. For service to the community.
- Raka Vagi. For services to religion and the community. Gane Zomina. For service to the community.

== Solomon Islands ==
=== Order of the British Empire ===
==== Officer of The Order of the British Empire (OBE) ====
- Bruce Joshua Saunders. For services to business and the community.
- Alfred John Robert Scholz. For services to commerce and to the community.

==== Member of The Order of the British Empire (MBE) ====
- Ishmael Mali Avui. For services to public administration and to the community.
- Chief Chrisanto Otuana. For services to local government and the community.

== Tuvalu ==
=== Order of the British Empire ===
==== Officer of The Order of the British Empire (OBE) ====
- Annie, Mrs. Homasi. For public and community service.

==== Member of The Order of the British Empire (MBE) ====
- Namoliki Sualiki Neemia. For public and community service.
- Faiumu, Mrs. Puapua. For public and community service.
- Evi Tauaa. For public and community service.

=== British Empire Medal (BEM) ===
- Lepa Malaki. For service to the community.
- Faafou Paape. For service to the community.
- Paepae Pakaia. For service to the community.

== St Vincent and the Grenadines ==
=== Order of Saint Michael and Saint George ===
==== Companion of The Order of Saint Michael and Saint George (CMG) ====
- Dr. Arthur Cecil Cyrus, O.B.E. For service in the field of medicine.

=== Order of the British Empire ===
==== Officer of The Order of the British Empire (OBE) ====
- Creighton Teroy Bacchus. For service to the community.
- Miss Grace Beatrice Lauretta Eustace. For service to education.

==== Member of The Order of the British Empire (MBE) ====
- Frederick Adolphos Gonsalves. For service to the business community and to wine making.
- Jeffrey Louis King. For service to the shipping industry.
- Miss Alice Maureen Mandeville. For service to trade unionism.

== Belize ==
=== Order of the British Empire ===
==== Officer of The Order of the British Empire (OBE) ====
- Carlos Cecil Fuller. For public service.
- Herbert Douglas Robert Lord. For public service.

==== Member of The Order of the British Empire (MBE) ====
- Santiago Castillo. For services to sport and the community.
- Edward Nabil Musa. For services to sport and the community.
- Vincent Delvorine, Mrs. Parks. For services to education and the community.
- Therese Bedran, Mrs. Stark. For service to the community.
- Rosendo Antonio Urbina. For services to education and the community.

== St Christopher and Nevis ==
=== Order of the British Empire ===
==== Officer of The Order of the British Empire (OBE) ====
- Elaine Dulcie, Mrs. Richardson. For public service.

==== Member of The Order of the British Empire (MBE) ====
- Samuel Alexander Byron. For service to the community.
- Frederick Alphonso Lewis. For public service.
