= Shebbeare =

Shebbeare is a surname, and may refer to:

- John Shebbeare (1709–1788), British Tory political satirist
- Robert Shebbeare (1827–1860), English recipient of the Victoria Cross
- Edward Oswald Shebbeare (1884-1964), British mountaineer, naturalist and forester
- Tom Shebbeare (born 1952), British business executive
