= Annie Homasi =

Annie Homasi OBE is a Tuvaluan community leader. She is executive director of the Tuvalu Association of Non-Government Organisations (TANGO), an umbrella organization for NGOs in Tuvalu.

In 2006 Homasi made an unsuccessful bid to enter parliament, standing against the caretaker Prime Minister Maatia Toafa.

Homasi was appointed an Officer of the Order of the British Empire (OBE) for public and community service in the 2003 New Year Honours.
