= Gail Bromley =

English botanist (1950–2023)

Gail Bromley MBE FLS
- Born: Gail Linda Rowat Hayes; 19 November 1950; Watford, London, England
- Died: 7 May 2023 (aged 72); Woking, Surrey
- Resting place: Cremated at Woking Crematorium
- Education: Harrow County School for Girls; University of London
- Scientific career
- Fields: Botany
- Workplaces: Kew Gardens

Gail Linda Rowat Bromley MBE FLS (née Hayes; 19 November 1950 – 7 May 2023) was an English botanist who worked at Kew Gardens, initially as a taxonomist and then as education development manager.

== Early life and education ==
Gail Linda Rowat Hayes was born in Watford in 1950. She went to Harrow County School for Girls, and then obtained her first degree and Master of Science degree at the University of London.

== Career ==
Bromley initially worked in the herbarium at Kew Gardens from 1975 on the Kew Record of Taxonomic Literature and then as a taxonomist, promoted in 1984 to Higher Scientific Officer, when she took part in an expedition to Brazil. In 1985 she moved to work in the gardens as a Guide Lecturer, in 1994 becoming Head of Community Engagement and Volunteering, where she set up the adult education programme and established the volunteer programme.

In 2013 Bromley left Kew after 38 years, setting up her own company, Planting Values, freelancing in heritage education. She later worked for Botanic Gardens Conservation International as Biodiversity Education Officer on the BigPicnic project sponsored by Horizon 2020 and LearntoEngage project for the EU. She was a director of Botanic Garden Education Network (BGEN), Chief Education Officer for Historic Houses Association and Chair of the Board Of Trustees, National Heritage.

== Personal life and death ==
Gail Hayes married David Bromley in 1974; they had two children, a girl and a boy. She died on 7 May 2023.

== Recognition ==
Bromley was awarded an MBE for services to Education in the 2003 New Year Honours. She was elected a Fellow of the Linnean Society in 1987.
