= David Hall (paediatrician) =

British paediatrician (born 1945)

Sir David Hall
- Born: David Michael Baldock Hall; 4 August 1945 (age 81); Reigate, Surrey, England
- Education: King's College London, St George's Hospital, University of London
- Known for: Creating the report Health for all children that led to one of the first attempts to apply an objective evidence-based approach to medical practice for children.
- Scientific career
- Fields: Community Pediatrics

Sir David Michael Baldock Hall (born 4 August 1945) is a British paediatrician. Hall is most notable for publishing a paper with Gillian Baird, on the role of primary care in identifying developmental problems in children that later resulted in the series of books being published called Health for all children that led in turn to one of the first attempts to apply an objective evidence based approach to medical practice for children. Hall is emeritus professor of community paediatrics at the Institute of General Practice and Primary Care, University of Sheffield.

== Biography ==
Hall was born in Woking, Surrey, and was educated at Reigate Grammar School. His early medical training was at King's College London (MB BS, BSc). Hall studied medicine at St George's Hospital and the University of London graduating with a Gold medal and qualifying in 1969. From 1973–78, he was Senior Medical Officer at Chris Hani Baragwanath Hospital in Johannesburg.

Hall met his wife at King's College, London, Susan Hall. Susan Hall is a public health specialist, and an honorary professor at the School of Child and Adolescent Health, University of Cape Town. They have two daughters and two granddaughters.

Hall retired in 2005 and moved with his wife Susan, to Cape Town. In Cape Town, the Halls were active in their retirements, working in the area of KwaZulu-Natal in local projects, as well as teaching and lecturing at the Red Cross War Memorial Children's Hospital in Cape Town. They contributed to establishing a Master's degree in paediatric public health and supported a rural pre-school literacy programme.

== Career ==
After graduation, Hall took a position as house officer at Croydon University Hospital. Hall spent a year in Canada as an intern at the Janeway Children's Health and Rehabilitation Centre. It was the internship that defined his specialism. Upon returning to the UK, Hall took a position as a paediatric audiologist at the Royal National Throat, Nose and Ear Hospital. Hall spent a further year at the Queen Elizabeth Hospital for Children as a senior house officer.

In 1973, Hall and his family moved to Baragwanath Hospital in Johannesburg, South Africa for a 3-year posting with his wife. At Baragwanath Hospital, Hall studied paediatrics, neonatology as well as Pediatric Neurology and this set his career specialism in place, with an interest in childhood disability. When Hall returned to the UK, he obtained a position at the Charing Cross Hospital as a senior registrar in child development.

From 1978 Hall was appointed to the position of consultant at St George's Hospital in London. As a consultant Hall was responsible for children with disabilities. In 1993, Hall moved to University of Sheffield and was promoted to Professor of community paediatrics. While at Sheffield, Hall developed, with colleagues, a Master's degree programme for neurodisability, advanced education standards for paediatricians, worked as an investigator on the National Evaluation of the Sure Start campaign as well as consult on Scoliosis and adolescence for the Department of Health and Social Care. Hall became emeritus Professor of Community Paediatrics in 2005.

In June 2006, Hall acting within a group of 30 leading scientists, including child health experts, wrote an open letter to the UK Government, and the people of the United Kingdom, in an effort to close the autism and MMR vaccine controversy. Hall stated that:

"The time has come to draw a line under the question of any association between the MMR vaccine and autism. The UK's children are in danger of serious illness or death if they are left unimmunised."

== Health for all children ==
In 1985, Hall published a paper with Gillian Baird amongst others, on the role of primary care in identifying developmental problems. Hall advanced the idea that there was a strong association between development problems at school entry and well understood parent and family risks to health. The group stated that strategies to improve health care outcomes would include family support, high quality early education and care programmes and early detection of problems at pre-school. Hall presented evidence that strategies and programmes for health care were best delivered inside a service framework, that the group called a framework of progressive universalism, where a universal selection of services for children and families would provide the earliest identification and appropriate treatment of development problems in the child.

In 1986, Hall was contacted by the British Paediatric Association and invited to act on the findings of the report. This led to the Hall chairing the Joint Working Party on Child Health Surveillance at the BPA. The group included a number of individuals from different areas of the paediatrics profession. The group reviewed working practices of the paediatrics professions, in all areas of the NHS. The results of the first working party in 1989, was a report, in which the group found there was a complete lack of evidence on the history of development problems in children, and the current reliability of screening tests. A set of activities was proposed to advance the profession. The second edition was widely published.

Health for all children was one of the first attempts to use an evidence-based approach in the formulation of health care for children, and it led to vigorous debate in the paediatrics community both in the UK as well as the United States, Scandinavia, Hong Kong and Australia.

== Societies ==
Between 2000 and 2003 Hall was President of the Royal College of Paediatrics and Child Health (previously the British Paediatric Association. )

== Bibliography ==
The first edition of Health for all children was published by Hall and David Elliman in 1989. The book was built on an evidence review of a project called Child Health Surveillance, that is designed to routinely conduct child health checks for a child in the first five years of their life. The aims of the programme were described and a new approach was proposed. The second edition was published in 1992, with a focus on knowledge and skills, as opposed to professional labels for procedures and processes. The third edition was published in 1996. Its message was that preventative health service for children should extend beyond the narrow child health surveillance, with its focus on the detection of illness and abnormalities in the child, to encompass positive effort to prevent illness and promote good health. The fourth edition was published only 5 years after the third, with the Polnay Report on the Health needs of school-age children published, and the rapidly increasing pace of change, necessitated that a new version was necessary. This version moved further from the old defect-detecting model to a health promotion model, with a focus on how local community health related to the health of the individual child.

The child surveillance handbook was a practical handbook that accompanied each report. Other books written by Hall were;

- Hall, David M B; Hill, P D (1997). The child with a disability (2nd ed.). Oxford; Cambridge: MA. ISBN 9780632047765.
- Hall, David M B (1984). The child with a handicap. Oxford, Boston: Blackwell Scientific Publications. ISBN 9780632010110. OCLC 21525772.
