= Robert Shebbeare =

Recipient of the Victoria Cross

Robert Haydon Shebbeare
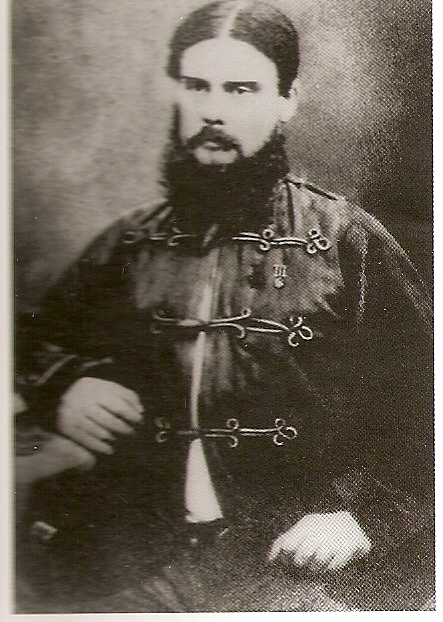
- Born: 13 January 1827; Clapham, London
- Died: 16 September 1860 (aged 33)
- Burial place: Buried at sea
- Military career
- Allegiance: United Kingdom
- Branch: Bengal Army
- Service years: 1844–1860
- Rank: Captain
- Units: 60th Bengal Native Infantry
- Conflicts: Indian Mutiny; Second Opium War
- Awards: Victoria Cross

Robert Haydon Shebbeare VC (13 January 1827 – 16 September 1860) was an English recipient of the Victoria Cross, the highest and most prestigious award for gallantry in the face of the enemy that can be awarded to British and Commonwealth forces.

== Background ==
He was educated at King's College School, then the junior part of King's College London. Philip Salkeld, Shebbeare's fellow schoolboy at King's College School, was also awarded the Victoria Cross for action on the same day, for his role in the attack on Delhi's Kashmir Gate.

== India ==
Robert Shebbeare left his middle-class suburban home near London in 1844 at the age of seventeen as a subaltern cadet in the 60th Bengal Native Infantry to make his future in India. After 12 years of ordinary regimental duties, he was eventually caught up in the extraordinary events of the Indian Mutiny where he could achieve something himself. With fellow officers he managed to escape to Delhi, where he was attached to the Guides and took part in most of the action during the long hot summer of 1857, during which he was wounded six times.

In a letter to his mother he wrote: "I was wounded by three bullets on 14 July and again by one on 14 September... In addition to these wounds, two musket balls went through my hat. The first slightly grazed my scalp, giving me a severe headache and making me feel very sick. The second cut through a very thick turban and knocked me down on my face, but without doing me any injury. On the same day and shortly afterwards a ball hit me on the (right) jawbone but glanced off with no worse effect than making me bleed violently and giving me a very mumpish appearance for some days."

=== VC award ===
Shebbeare was 30 years old, and a lieutenant in the 60th Bengal Native Infantry, Bengal Army during the Indian Mutiny when the following deed took place for which he was awarded the VC:

For distinguished gallantry at the head of the Guides with the 4th column of assault at Delhi, on the 14th of September, 1857, when, after twice charging beneath the wall of the loopholed Serai, it was found impossible, owing to the murderous fire, to attain the breach. Captain (then Lieutenant) Shebbeare endeavoured to re-organize the men, but one-third, of the Europeans having fallen, his efforts to do so failed. He then conducted the rearguard of the retreat across the canal most successfully. He was most miraculously preserved through the affair but yet left the field with one bullet through his cheek, and a bad scalp wound along the back of the head from another.

== China ==
He raised a new regiment of Mazhabi Sikhs, the 15th Punjab Pioneers, which volunteered for service in China and took part in the advance on Peking in 1860. At the age of 33, after 16 years away from England, having risen from subaltern cadet to captain, having fought in two wars, and having won the highest and most prestigious award for gallantry in the face of the enemy, he sailed back home from China on the SS Emau to see his family again. When the ship arrived, his family were all waiting at the quayside to welcome the hero home; only to be told that he had died en route from an illness, probably malaria, and had been buried at sea in the East China Sea.

Robert Shebbeare's descendants include Lieutenant Colonel Robert A Shebbeare, and his great great nephew Sir Tom Shebbeare, KCVO.
