= Beverley Hodson =

British businesswoman

Beverley Hodson OBE (1951–2023) was a British businesswoman who held executive roles at Boots and WHSmith. She was the first female executive director of WH Smith and was appointed an Officer of the Order of the British Empire (OBE) in 2003 for services to the retail sector.

== Early life and education ==
Beverley Cliffe Hodson was born in Tunbridge Wells, Kent. She attended Blackheath High School and later studied at Newnham College, Cambridge, where she received a first-class degree in English.

== Career ==
Hodson began her career in marketing at the National Theatre before joining Boots, where she worked for 18 years and became buying and marketing controller. In 1995, she was appointed managing director of the company's Children's World division and managed its sale to Storehouse/Mothercare.

In 1997, Hodson became the first female executive director of WH Smith, with responsibility for its retail operations. She refocused the company on its core products of stationery, magazines, and news, while discontinuing food items. Her changes included staff retraining and new store layouts. In 2000, she reintroduced adult magazines, a decision that was later reversed.

In 2003, Hodson led a rebranding initiative. The company's trading performance did not improve, and she left WH Smith at the end of that year.

== Personal life ==
Hodson married Peter Cottingham in 1991. Their son, Thomas, was born with ataxia telangiectasia. Hodson and Cottingham co-founded the Thomas Appeal A-T Medical Research Trust to fund research on the condition. They divorced in 2015.

Hodson died on 27 July 2023 from pneumonia and related complications.
