= Tom Shebbeare =

Former CEO of the Prince's Trust (1988- 2003)

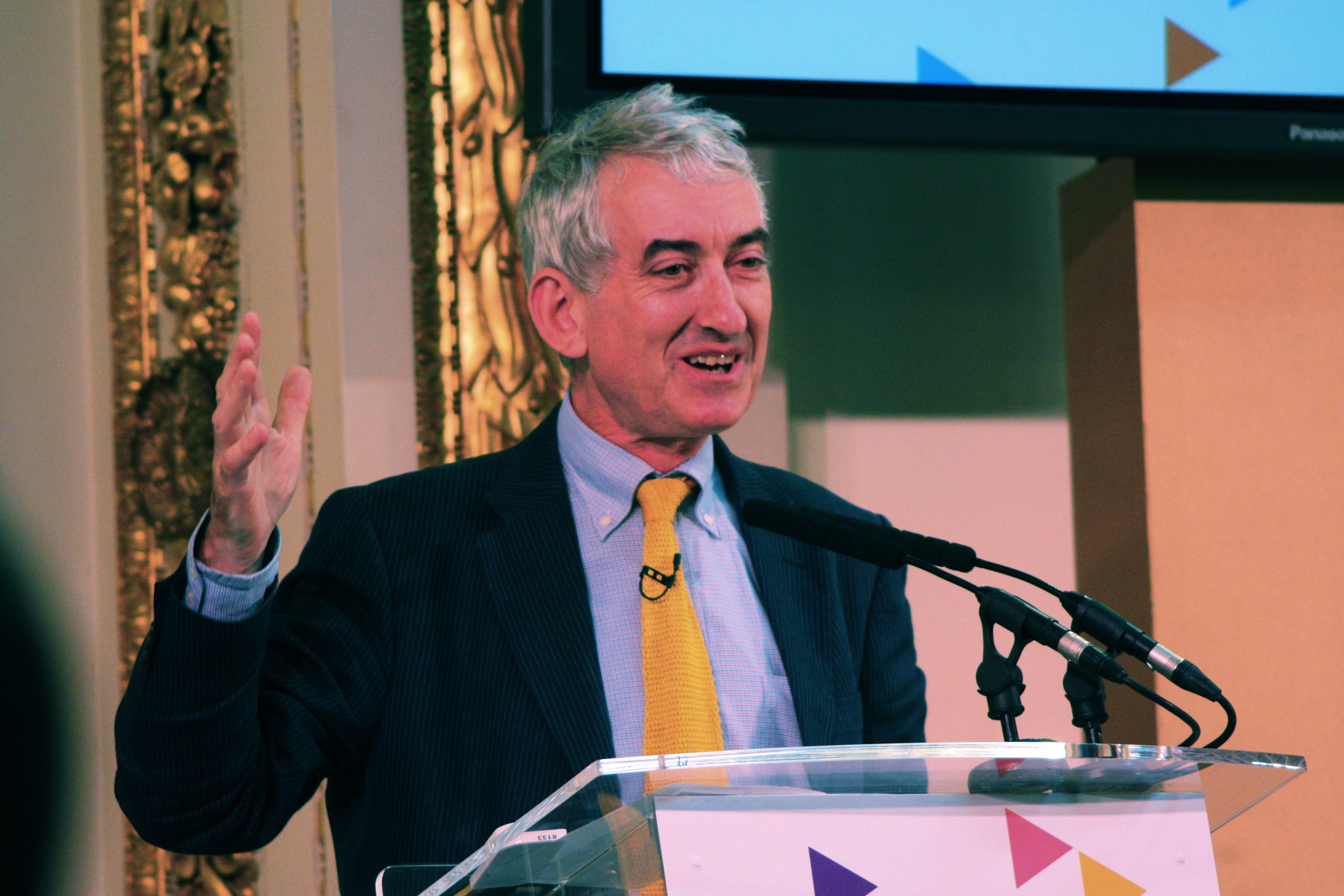
Sir Tom Shebbeare at a speaking event

Sir Tom Shebbeare, KCVO DL, (born 25 January 1952) was the chairman of Spring Films from 2012 to 2024, and a former chair of Virgin Money Giving, Virgin StartUp and The Royal Parks Foundation. He is the former CEO of The Prince's Trust (1988- 2003) and Director of Charities to His Royal Highness Charles, Prince of Wales, now His Majesty The King.

Shebbeare was educated at Malvern College and the University of Exeter, of which he was made an honorary LLD in 2005.

Shebbeare joined the UK branch of World University Service in 1973, an international development agency specialising in refugee resettlement. In 1975, he became general secretary of the British Youth Council before moving, in 1980, to the permanent staff of the Council of Europe. In 1985, he became executive director of the European Youth Foundation (a Council of Europe institution).

In 1988, Shebbeare was recruited to head The Prince's Trust as its first full-time director. He became its chief executive in 1999 on its incorporation by Royal Charter. In 2003, he left to join the Office of HRH The Prince of Wales as director of The Prince's Charities, leaving in 2011 to become chairman of Virgin Money Giving, a not-for-profit company enabling charities to raise funds cheaply and effectively on-line. In 2013 he took on the additional role of chairman of Virgin StartUp which provides advice, mentoring and finance for aspiring entrepreneurs.

Shebbeare is a former director of Delphis Eco Ltd (UK), CIM Investment Management, and a Trustee of the Turquoise Mountain Foundation (Afghanistan) and The Prince's Charities Foundation (China). He is a former fellow of Green Templeton College, Oxford. He has served as a trustee of the Orchestra of St John's since 2022 and is a Deputy Lieutenant for Oxfordshire.

He is married to Cynthia, a former teacher. They have two children.

The great-uncle of Shebbeare's father was Robert Haydon Shebbeare, who won the Victoria Cross in 1857 for bravery during the Indian Mutiny.

Shebbeare was knighted in 2003 for services to charity.
