= Wallington County Grammar School =

Grammar academy in Wallington, London, England

Location
- Croydon Road; Wallington, London, SM6 7PH; England; 51.369°N 0.149°W

Information
- Former names: Wallington High School for Boys
- Type: Grammar, Academy
- Motto: Latin: Per Ardua ad Summa ('Through Difficulties to the Heights')
- Religious affiliation: Non-denominational
- Established: 19 September 1927; 99 years ago
- Founder: W.T. Hutchins
- Local authority: London Borough of Sutton
- Department for Education URN: 136798 Tables
- Ofsted: Reports
- Head of School: Jamie Bean
- Gender: Boys; Coeducational (Sixth Form)
- Age: 11 to 18
- Enrolment: 1095
- Houses: Bridges, Carew, Mandeville, Radcliffe, Ruskin, Woodcote
- Colors: Navy, Yellow
- Publication: The Record, The Wall, The Walcountian
- Alumni: Old Walcountians
- Website: http://www.wcgs-sutton.co.uk/

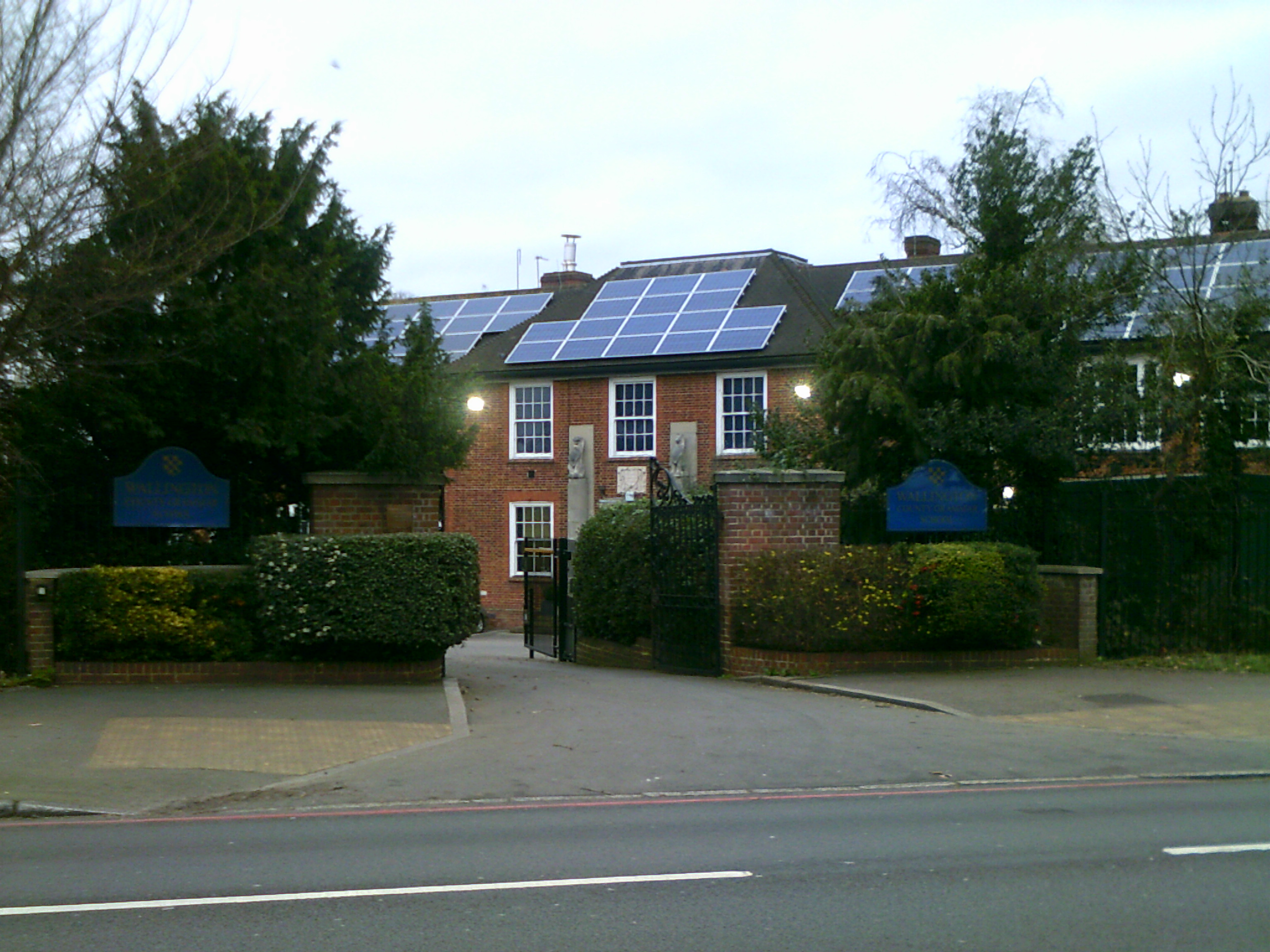
WCGS − View from Croydon Road

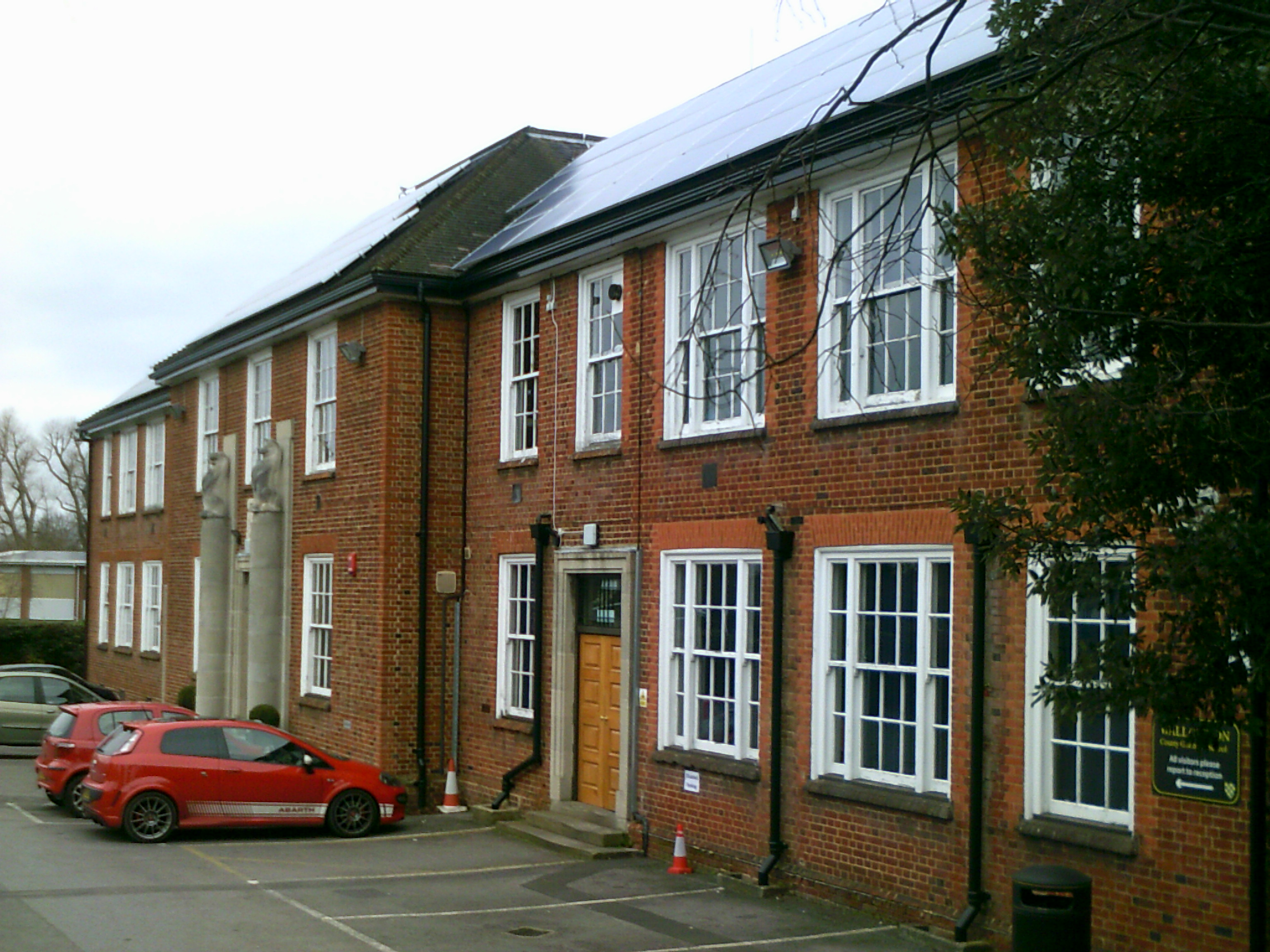
WCGS − Front entrance

Wallington County Grammar School (WCGS) is a selective state boys' grammar school with a coeducational Sixth Form located in the London Borough of Sutton. From 1968 until 1992 the school was known as Wallington High School for Boys, one of a handful of grammar schools in the borough.

== History ==
WCGS opened on 19 September 1927 on the 33rd birthday of its founding headmaster, W.T. Hutchins, with 71 pupils, half a mile from the current site. The building had a single storey, with a wooden extension. The school moved to its present site on Croydon Road in 1935.

During the Second World War, WCGS was damaged by a V-2 bomb. All windows were blown out and the roof collapsed. WCGS continued to function, with teachers and students working to rebuild the structure. 52 old boys were killed in action.

The 1950s to 1970s marked a period of expansion and development for the school beyond its original structure as new buildings were constructed to meet the growing number of pupils. The "New Block" ("English Block"), which contains laboratories and classrooms, was opened in 1952. It now houses all English classes, as well as the dining hall. From the late 1950s until 1972, the first two years of the school were housed in classrooms at Carew Manor, half a mile away in Beddington Park. The Sixth Form block, located near the school playing fields, was completed in 1973, now containing classrooms instead.

In 1997, an old boy of WCGS, Chris Woodhead who was then HM Chief Inspector of Schools, opened a new science block. This block contains science classrooms, laboratories and various science department administration offices. The second part of the building's development was completed in 2000.

Girls were admitted to the sixth form from September 1999. WCGS gained academy status on 1 June 2011.

Construction of a new DT and Music block was completed in August 2019 and opened starting from the academic year 2019–20 onwards.

Jamal Ottun, a Year 12 student at the school, died after drowning in a lake at a swimming trip on the school's biennial Canada Rugby Tour. It was later determined by an inquest that Ottun was pushed into Shawnigan Lake, Vancouver Island by a fellow student. In his memory, the "Jamal Ottun Scholarship" was founded, a £5,000 grant given by the Ottun family to support the tuition fees of students who "exemplify the values that Jamal embodied in his time at the school".

=== Headteachers ===
- W.T. Hutchins, 1927–1959
- J. Hitchin, 1959–1975
- R.S. Harrison, 1975–1990
- J. Martin Haworth, 1990–2009
- Peter Smart, Acting 2009–2010; permanent 2010–2013
- Jonathan Wilden, 2013–2016
- Jonathan Wilden, Executive Headteacher of Folio Education Trust, 2016 – present
- Jamie Bean, Head Of School, 2016 – present

WCGS joined the Folio Education Trust during the administration of Jonathan Wilden, whereupon he assumed the title of "Executive Headteacher" for the schools comprising the Trust, with Jamie Bean having since taken over local control as the acting headmaster of the school.

== Houses ==
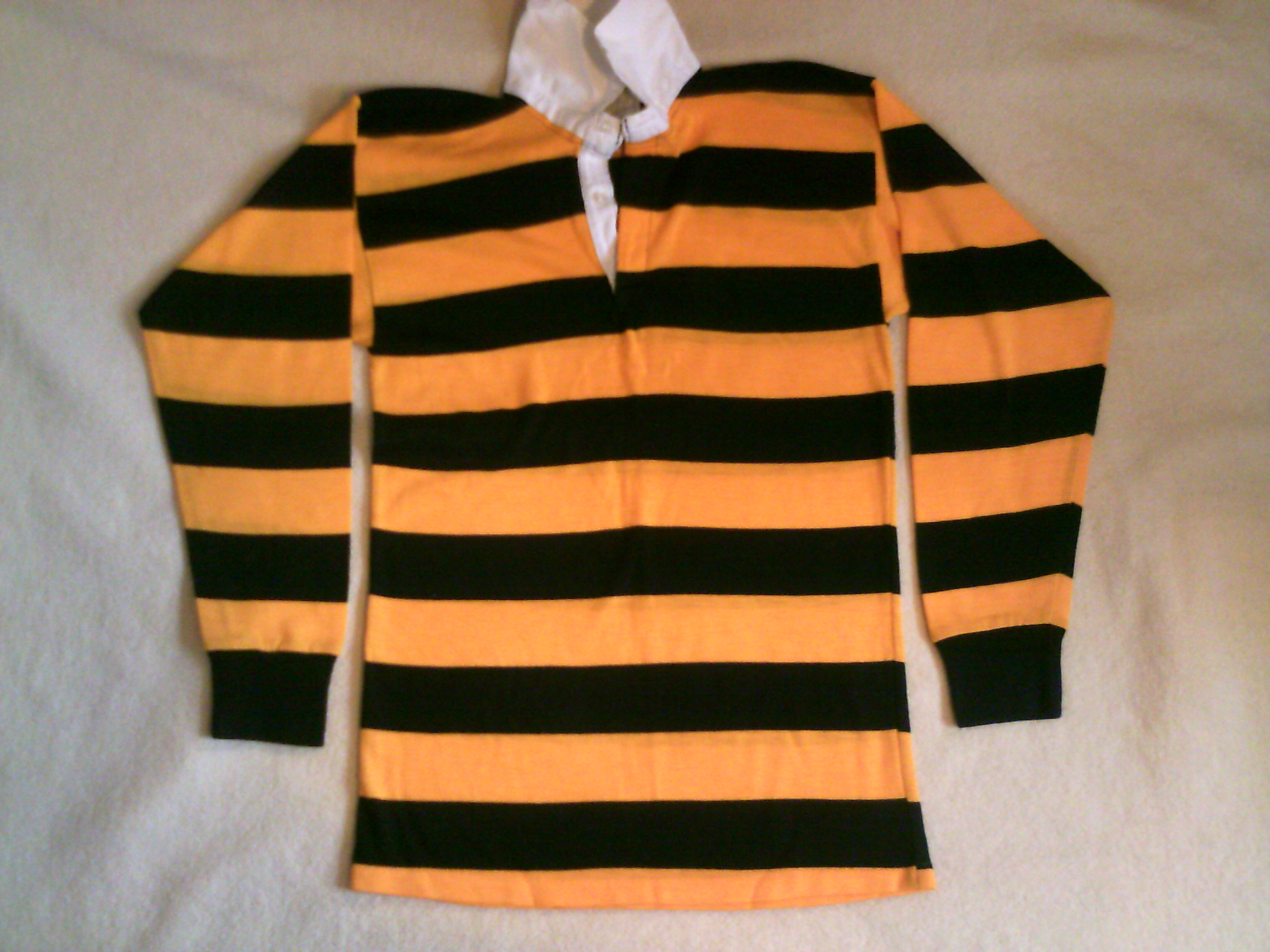
Ruskin rugby shirt

On admission to the School, all pupils are assigned to one of six Houses, a vertical system. Pupils represent their houses in competitions all throughout the school year. The leading house wins the Cock House Cup.

House	Colours	Namesake
Ruskin	Yellow & Black	Named after the writer, poet and art critic John Ruskin
Woodcote	Green & Black	A part of Wallington noted in Roman area records
Radcliffe	Navy & Sky Blue	Named after John Radcliffe, the 17th century physician and former area resident
Mandeville	Maroon & White	Named after Sir Geoffrey de Mandeville, resident and landholder after the Norman Conquest and mentioned in Domesday Book
Bridges	Blue & White	Named after sometime area resident, Canon Alexander Henry Bridges, Rector of Beddington
Carew	Blue & Red	A reference to a family of nobility in the area in Tudor times and has a manor local to the school.

== Academic performance ==
Academic performance at Wallington County Grammar School is outstanding, with students entering WCGS with very high levels of attainment. Progress and attainment in the Sixth Form are also exceptional. In the latest Ofsted report from 2017, WCGS was rated 'outstanding' in all areas, including Achievement, Behaviour and Safety of pupils; Quality of teaching, learning and assessment; Personal development and Welfare; 16 to 19 study programmes; and Leadership and Management.

WCGS was awarded "science college" status in 2005 for its excellence in science and mathematics. This meant extra funding for the school, which helped to further improve the standard of the school's science department. More recently, WCGS was awarded a second specialism—"WCGS Applied Learning".

In February 2019, the school won the Evening Standard's Outstanding Academic Achievement Award, while its latest 'Progress 8' score places it amongst the top four per cent of mainstream state-funded schools in the UK.

== Notable alumni ==
The following is a list of notable former pupils educated at Wallington, known as Old Walcountians:

- John M. Allegro, archaeologist and Dead Sea Scrolls scholar, author of The Sacred Mushroom and the Cross
- Douglas Allen, Baron Croham , senior civil servant
- Neil Ardley, musician, author
- Harold Barlow, engineer, Pender Chair of University College London, Department of Electronic and Electrical Engineering, 1950–1966
- Herbert Barrie, paediatrician, co-founder of the Neonatal Society and the British Association of Perinatal Medicine
- Bryant Bilongo, Professional Footballer, Bristol Rovers F.C.
- David Bond, journalist, BBC sports editor 2009–2014
- John Cameron, composer, musician and recording artist, wrote theme music for Top of the Pops, orchestrator of Les Misérables
- Ryan Cummins, retired county cricketer, (Leicestershire and Northamptonshire)
- Paul Deighton, Baron Deighton, investment banker, executive of London Organising Committee for the Olympic Games 2012
- Sunny Edwards, professional flyweight and super flyweight boxer
- Jim Horne, sleep neuroscientist and Professor Emeritus at University of Loughborough, England
- Norman Long, social anthropologist and Professor Emeritus at Wageningen University, Netherlands
- Mark Pallen, Professor of Microbial Genomics at the University of East Anglia, captain of winning team from Imperial College in University Challenge, 1995–96
- John Randall, former President of the National Union of Students, senior civil servant
- Nick Ross, ex-presenter of Crimewatch
- Malcolm Savidge, former Member of Parliament for Aberdeen North
- M. J. Seaton, Professor of Physics at University College London, President of the Royal Astronomical Society
- Mark Thurston, engineer, Chief Executive Officer of HS2 rail network project
- Ivan Tyrrell, psychotherapist, educator and artist, founder of The Therapist journal (now 'Human Givens'), Director of Human Givens College
- Philip Wilcocks, Royal Navy officer (Rear Admiral)
- Sir Christopher Woodhead, former HM Chief Inspector of Schools
- Philip Yea, Vodafone Director, chair of British Heart Foundation
