= Hugh Jolly =

British paediatrician (1918–1986)

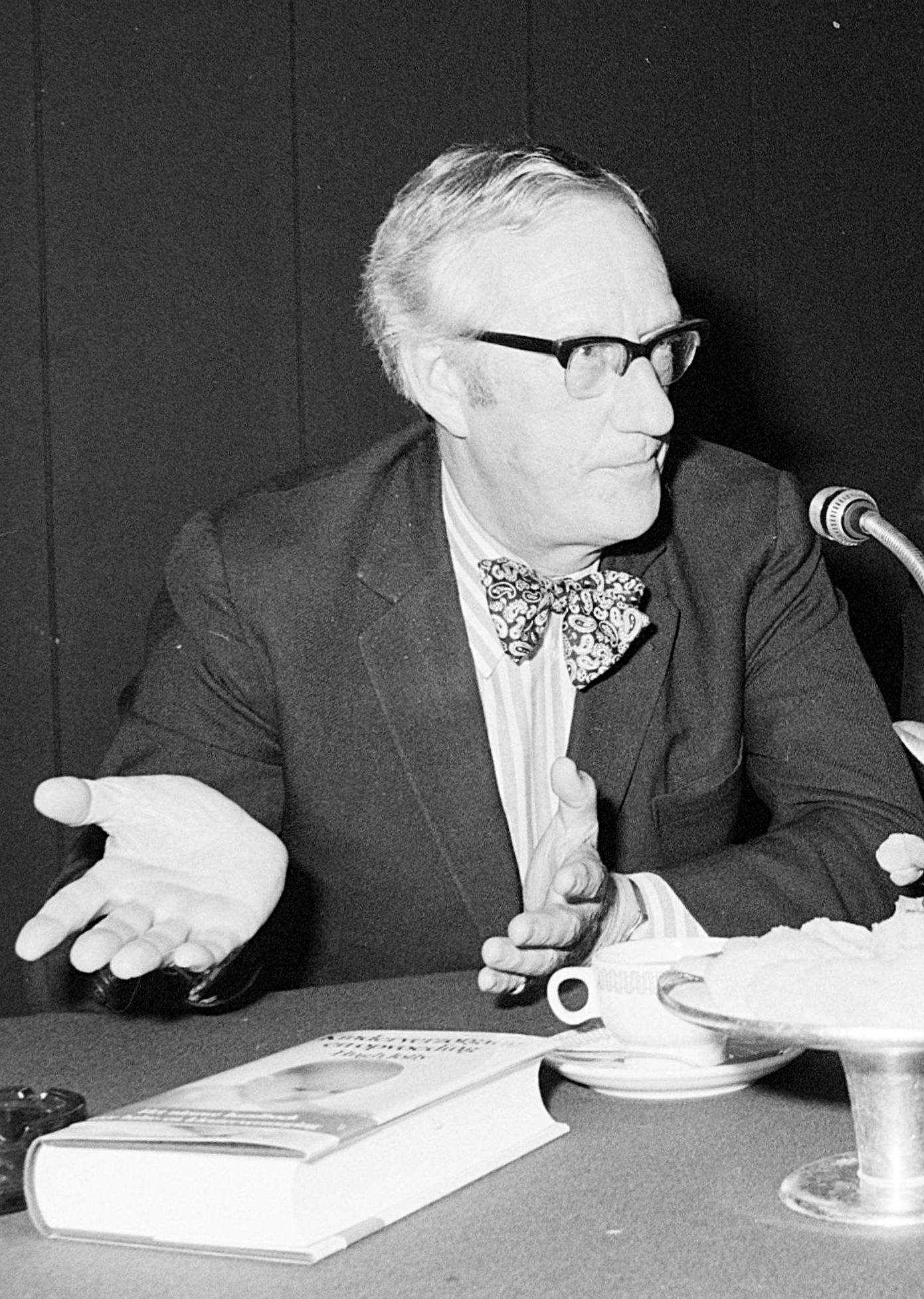
Hugh Jolly, 1977 photograph at a book presentation in Amsterdam

Hugh Reginald Jolly (1918–1986) was a celebrated British paediatrician. A colleague, Bernard Mosely Laurance, wrote that Jolly "was probably better known to the general public than any other living doctor." An obituary in the Midwives Chronicle said he was "the paediatrician who brought common sense to baby care and whose books and broadcasts earned him an international reputation."

== Early life ==
He was the son of the Rev. Reginald Bradley Jolly, from 1914 to 1920 vicar of St Thomas's Church, Douglas, Isle of Man, and his wife Muriel Ada Crawshaw, daughter of Simon Crawshaw of Ilkley; he was born on 5 May 1918 at Douglas. He was educated at Marlborough College, and graduated BA at Sidney Sussex College, Cambridge in 1939. A medical student at the London Hospital, he graduated MB, BChir in 1942 and MA 1943, also at Cambridge.

Jolly then took houseman posts at London Hospital, where he was a children's physician under Maitland Jones and Doyne Bell, and North Middlesex Hospital, in 1943. By then qualified, Jolly spent three years, from 1944 to 1947, in the RAMC as a dermatologist, with the rank of captain. Treating British soldiers at Bandoeng, he met Dirk Bogarde. There was a further encounter in 1946 at Tanglin Barracks, a transit camp in Singapore. Bogarde became a friend, and godfather to Jolly's daughter. Bogarde's biographer John Coldstream comments that Jolly was "Theatrical in temperament and stage-struck by inclination". In a 1951 directory, Jolly's address is given as Rockshaw Lodge, Merstham.

Back in London, Jolly had a post at Great Ormond Street Hospital, from 1948 to 1951. In 1951 he became a consultant paediatrician at Plymouth Hospital.

Around 1952, Jolly visited the Children's Hospital of Philadelphia. He saw there the work on infantile hydrocephalus of the surgeon Eugene B. Spitz, inventor with John Holter of the cerebral shunt called the Spitz-Holter valve, that was introduced at this time. At Plymouth, Jolly trained June Lloyd, as she tried to make her way into paediatrics. In 1959, he was a founder member of the Neonatal Society.

== At Charing Cross Hospital ==
Brought in by Doyne Bell, Jolly served as consultant paediatrician at Charing Cross Hospital from 1960 to 1984. Herbert Barrie was appointed as consultant paediatrician and colleague to Jolly in 1966. His son wrote that Jolly was:

[...] a larger-than-life character with boundless enthusiasm who espoused the rights of parents and the 'whole child'. Innovative, certainly, but Jolly was not always an easy man to work with.

An American journal wrote in 1969 "his compassion for his young charges elicits a strong relationship of trust". David Hall trained in paediatrics with Jolly and the consultant psychotherapist Emanuel Lewis. Lewis had trained at the Tavistock Clinic, before joining Charing Cross Hospital.

=== Child Development Centre ===
Jolly was Director of the Child Development Centre of Charing Cross Hospital. In 1972 it was on the Fulham Hospital site. It comprised a nursery for children of staff, an assessment unit where handicapped children would attend every day over three weeks, and a treatment unit. Jolly favoured paediatricians giving a summary letter of assessment findings to parents,

In 1970 Jolly brought in Nancy Ruth Finnie, a physical therapist at the Bobath Centre, as Deputy Director. Alison Levinge began a career as music therapist at the Centre, working with Jolly. He argued for the value of music therapy assessments. Elaine Streeter in Making Music with the Young Child with Special Needs (1993) thanked Jolly, after his death, for support at the Centre.

Andrea Clifford-Poston, who worked as Teacher-in-Charge at the Centre, wrote that:

Hugh Jolly helped mothers to feel less bullied by their children by refusing to use the phrase 'feeding on demand', changing it to 'on request'.

=== Views ===
Jolly, following pioneer work by Stanford (Sandy) Bourne (1928–2021) and Emanuel (Manny) Lewis, argued for a better psychological approach in medical practice after stillbirths. Also in this London group, sharing views on aspects of perinatal death, was the paediatrician David Morris (1915–1989). Jolly's views were reported in a 1976 interview: he "wants to bring about a change in procedures and attitudes. He believes that mothers should be helped to see and to touch the dead baby".

On co-sleeping, Jolly's view was quoted:

Psychoanalysts may be firm in their advice that parents must never allow their children into their beds, but those who have practiced it know better and have not had any dire consequences to face – just the opposite.

He promoted the idea of the "family bed".

Jolly was noted as a supporter of the role of play in the care of children, and was the initial external examiner for the first training course, at Chiswick College, for hospital play specialists. It was set up with the guidance of Jolly, with Susan Harvey and Gabi Marston.

==== Spina bifida treatment ====
Jolly's views on ethical concerns around passive euthanasia gained a high profile in 1981. The Nursing Mirror reported that

LIFE, the organisation which campaigns for unborn and newly-born babies, has asked the police to question Dr Hugh Jolly, physician-in-charge of Charing Cross Hospital's paediatric department[...]

On 1 March 1981, on the ITV programme Jaywalking, Jolly had given a standard argument on "letting nature take its course" in cases of severe handicap in newborn babies. LIFE is a British pro-life organisation, at that point chaired by the historian John Joseph Scarisbrick, and gave evidence to police. Jolly was regarded also as having given a frank account of the current treatment of some babies with spina bifida. Later that year Jolly was interviewed on an ITV documentary Live or Let Die? with Sue Jay.

On Jaywalking, Jolly is quoted as having said "that if a doctor and the parents thought that a spina bifida baby was so severe that the quality of life would fail, 'that baby should not be helped to survive.'" The case in question was that of Stephen Quinn:

[...] Stephen Quinn, who was born severely handicapped at Westminster Hospital in September 1979. He was transferred to Charing Cross special baby care clinic and died two weeks later. LIFE alleges he was maintained on sugared water and sedated with an hypnotic drug until he died. A police spokesman said Hammersmith detectives were investigating the allegations.

Jolly had a police interview, but the matter went no further, The Times reporting "No Action Against Dr Jolly". The issue was brought up in the House of Commons in 1982, when Gwyneth Dunwoody linked it in a question to the case of Leonard Arthur. In a submission of 1989 to a House of Lords committee, the Society for the Protection of Unborn Children gave this version of Jolly's comments on Jaywalking:

If you come to the opinion that this baby is so severe...this means that the baby is not going to be fed milk, but is going to be fed water. But if you...weaken on this one it means that you will almost certainly have a baby that will survive, when you have all (sic) come to the conclusion that...you wouldn't be wanting it to survive.

== Tropical medicine ==
Jolly was seconded in 1961 to a one-year professorship in paediatrics at University College, Ibadan in Nigeria. He served on the Tropical Medicine Research Board chaired by Graham MacGregor Bull, and was a visiting consultant at the Liverpool School of Tropical Medicine. In 1965–1967 he was visiting professor of Child Health, at Ghana Medical School.

A review in the South African Medical Journal of the 4th edition of Jolly's Diseases of Children noted "the full description of kwashiorkor and his comments on accidental poisoning by local African remedies".

== Media ==
Jolly wrote regularly on paediatrics for The Times. In 1977 he appeared in the ATV series All About Babies, for which he was a consultant, speaking to an audience of parents; it and its sequel All About Toddlers were "lively and fast-moving, aiming to engage 'unmotivated audiences' with minimal formal education." That year, he gave an Australian Broadcasting Corporation lecture, published in 1978 as "Loss of a Baby".

At a 1978 health conference:

Hugh Jolly said that he thought the one way to damn any programme would be to suggest that you were trying to educate the public about health.

== Death and reputation ==
On Jolly's death, the Acton Gazette ran the headline "Tributes to the British 'Dr. Spock'", and called him "Britain's top child care doctor". The People ran an article headlined "The children's friend", dealing with Jolly's reaction to legislation in the wake of the 1973 killing of Maria Colwell and attitude to fostering, by a foster mother he had helped in a dispute with a social worker.

== Works ==
- Sexual Precocity (1955)
- Diseases of Children (1964), a standard textbook, ran to five editions, the fourth written with Malcolm Levene, who was credited as co-author of the 5th edition (1985).
- The Book of Child Care (1975). In 1977, Elizabeth Newson called it "probably the most comprehensive and practical guide for parents since Spock."
- Common Sense about Babies and Children (1983). This and its sequel More Common Sense about Babies (1987) were compiled from Jolly's Times columns of the 1970s.
- The Grandparents' Handbook: A Practical Guide to Enjoying the New Generation (1984)
- The First Five Years: Dr. Hugh Jolly Answers Questions from Parents (1987)

An archive on historical child-rearing was compiled by Deirdre Le Faye from 1975 for Jolly, a project cut short by his death.

== Family ==
Jolly married in 1944, as her second husband, Geraldine Mary Howard MB BS (1917–1990), daughter of the Hon. Michael Francis Stafford Howard and granddaughter of George Howard, 9th Earl of Carlisle. She had married, firstly in December 1943, Frederick Hume Jackson of the Royal Artillery, son of Major-Gen. George Jackson and his wife Eileen Dudgeon: the marriage was annulled in 1944 on Frederick's petition. The couple had two sons and a daughter. In 1951 Geraldine was working as an obstetrician at University College Hospital.
