= The Crossley Heath School =

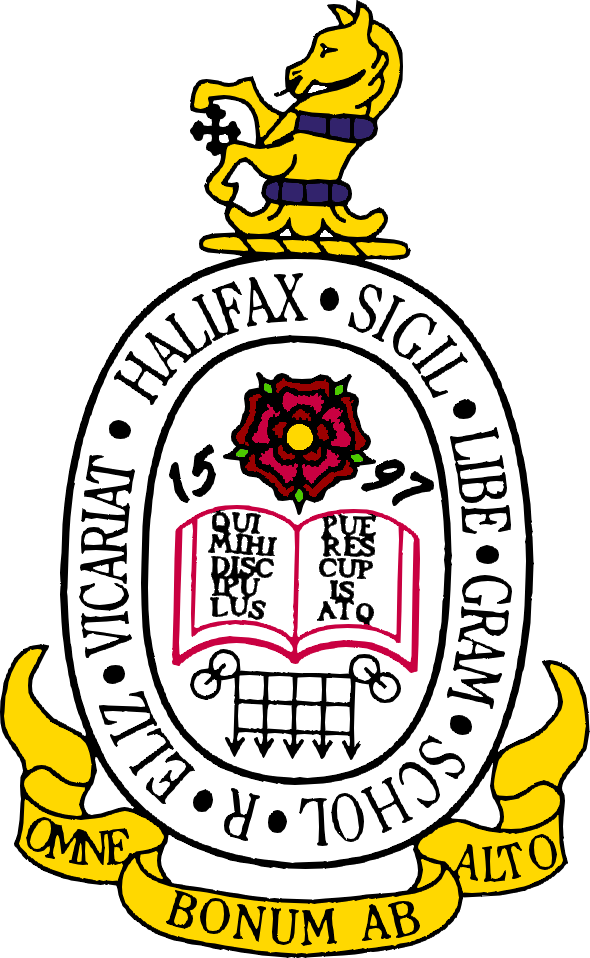

Location
- Savile Park; Halifax, West Yorkshire, HX3 0HG; England; 53.7116°N 1.878°W

Information
- Type: Grammar academy
- Motto: Omne Bonum Ab Alto (All good things come from above)
- Established: 1985 (current form); Heath Grammar School (1585); Crossley and Porter School (1887)
- Founders: Amalgamation
- Local authority: Calderdale Borough Council
- Trust: The Crossley Heath School Academy Trust Limited
- Department for Education URN: 139182 Tables
- Ofsted: Reports
- Chair of Governors: Yasmin Ahmed
- Head teacher: Dean Jones
- Gender: Mixed
- Age range: 11–18
- Enrolment: 1,133
- Capacity: 1,042
- Houses: Porter; Savile; Kings; Queens
- Colours: Black and Gold
- Website: www.crossleyheath.org.uk

The Crossley Heath School is an 11–18 co-educational, grammar school and sixth form with academy status in Halifax, West Yorkshire, England. It was established in 1985 following the amalgamation of Heath Grammar School and Crossley and Porter School. It is part of The Crossley Heath School Academy Trust Limited.

== History ==
The Crossley Heath School was established in 1985 following the amalgamation of Heath Grammar School and Crossley and Porter School.

=== Heath Grammar School ===
Heath Grammar School, Free School Lane, Halifax, West Yorkshire was founded in 1585 by Dr. John Favour. Its full title was The Free Grammar School of Queen Elizabeth. Henry Farror and his brother gave 2 acres (8,100 m^{2}) of land in Skircoat Green and personally obtained the school charter from Elizabeth I of England at his own expense. Dr Favour became the Vicar of Halifax in 1593.

The original governors selected from among the most respectable of the parishioners were responsible for the appointment of the head master and usher the former of whom must have been a student for a period of five years at one of the Universities. The school house with 6 acres (24,000 m^{2}) of land contiguous to it was given by Gilbert Earl of Shrewsbury, Edward Savile Esq and Sir George Savile Knt in 1598 and several benefactions have since been added to the original endowment among which is one by the Rev Thomas Milner who by will in 1722 assigned to the Master and Fellows of Magdalene College, Cambridge, a reversionary grant of £1000 for founding three scholarships for the benefit of the schools at Haversham, Leeds and Halifax and in 1736 his sister added £200 for the same purpose. The head master received £80 per annum, out of which he paid an usher of his own appointment.

The seal of Heath Grammar School shows a book with the Latin words: "Qui mihi discipulus puer es cupis atque" which translates to "You who are my pupil and wish to be taught". The main school is now a listed Building.

=== Crossley and Porter School ===
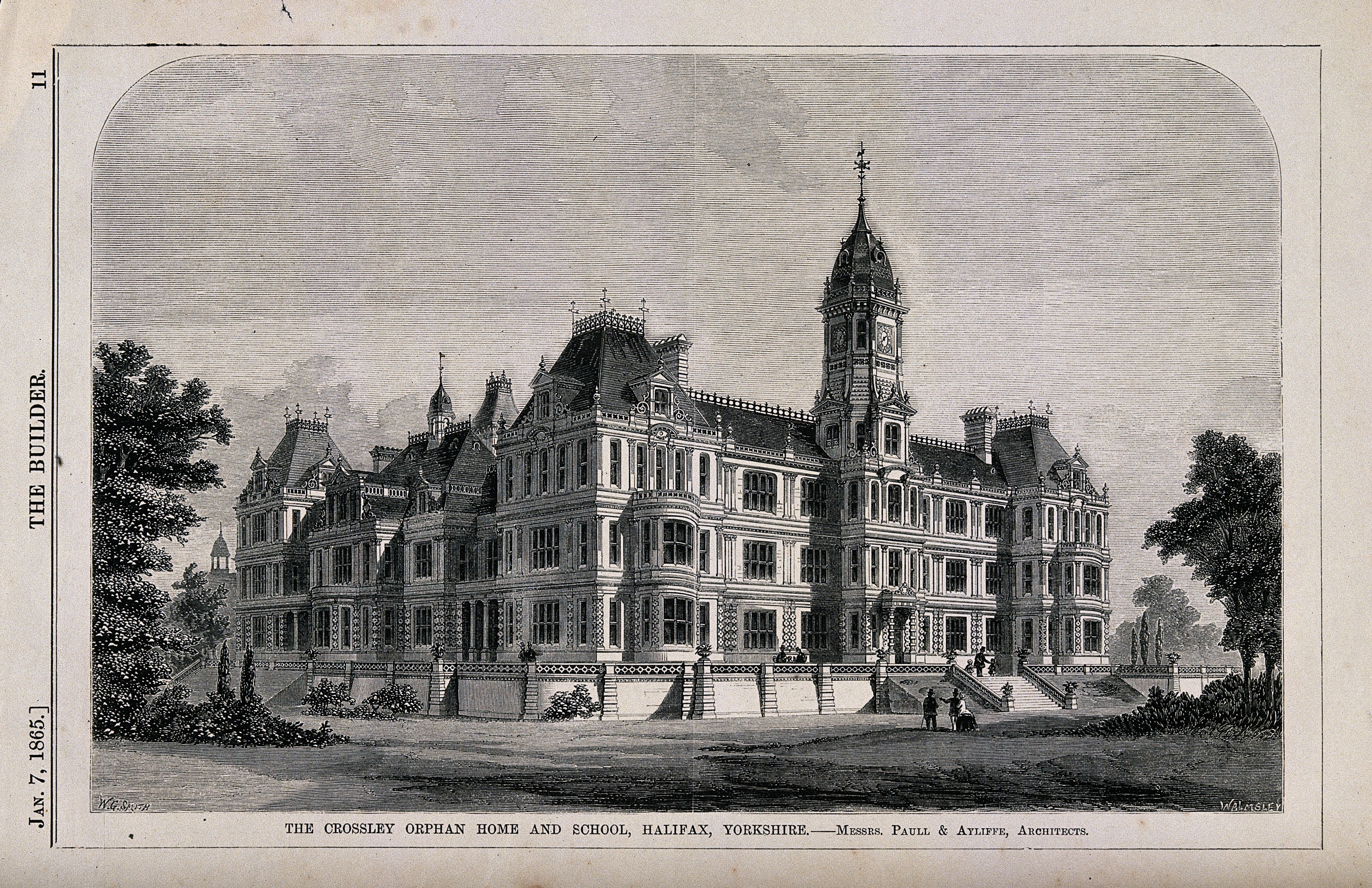
Crossley Orphan Home and School

In 1857 Frank (later Sir Francis Crossley, 1st Baronet) and John Crossley, of Dean Clough Mills, founded an orphanage through capital of £56,000 and a further endowment of £50,000. In 1887, after a gift of £50,000 from Thomas Porter, a Manchester yarn merchant, the orphanage was extended to include schooling. Over time, the need for an orphanage decreased and the school became a grammar school. The building was designed by John Hogg, a local architect.

At the time of the 1881 census, Head master William Cambridge Barber, assisted by a Matron, Head mistress, and 8 assistant masters and mistresses, presided over a population of 216 "scholar orphans." They included 84 girls and 132 boys, ranging in age from 7 to 16. They were mostly English born, but included a few Irish as well as children from as far away as Australia.

A Royal Charter of 31 January 1887, named the institution The Crossley and Porter Orphan Home and School. In 1919 the school was given royal permission to admit day pupils.

There were two sections – the Crossley and Porter Boys' School, with around 300 boys, and the Crossley and Porter Girls' School, with around 450 girls, administered by the County Borough of Halifax. In 1967, it became the co-educational Crossley and Porter School with around 800 girls and boys.

=== The Crossley Heath School ===
The amalgamation required a re-organisation of the two sets of staff, the net outcome being the former Headmaster of Crossley and Porter, Paul Barker, became the Head of the new school with John Bunch, former acting Head of Heath becoming Deputy Headmaster. The first intake of true Crossley Heath students arrived on Tuesday 27 August 1985. The initial intake was circa 90 pupils; a reduction from the previous intakes of Crossley and Porter and Heath intakes by around 50 pupils.

The school was initially located on two sites, the former Heath Grammar School building (initially referred to as the Crossley Heath Annex but later changed to the Crossley Heath 6th Form Centre) and the Crossley and Porter School building. The former Heath building initially housed the combined sixth forms of the two schools, plus the combined fourth form, with all other years being housed at Savile Park. As the number of pupils reduced over the coming years, the 6th form and 4th form were relocated to the Savile Park site and the Free School Lane site was passed over to the local authority to become a training centre. Throughout this period, the staff head count was also reduced to reflect the smaller number of pupils.

The school became a Specialist Language College in 2003. In 2006 it was designated a Language College and a second specialism as a Leadership Partner school was granted in 2007. In 2010 a sports hall was built, which provided an extra sport and dance facility (supplementing the two Victorian gymnasia) for students and staff. It also provides a space in which the whole school can congregate.

The school converted to academy status in January 2013. In 2015, headteacher Wendy Moffat announced plans for a new sixth form block to replace the existing ageing facilities had been approved and construction was to begin immediately. Construction took just over a year and the building opened to students in early 2016.

== Today ==
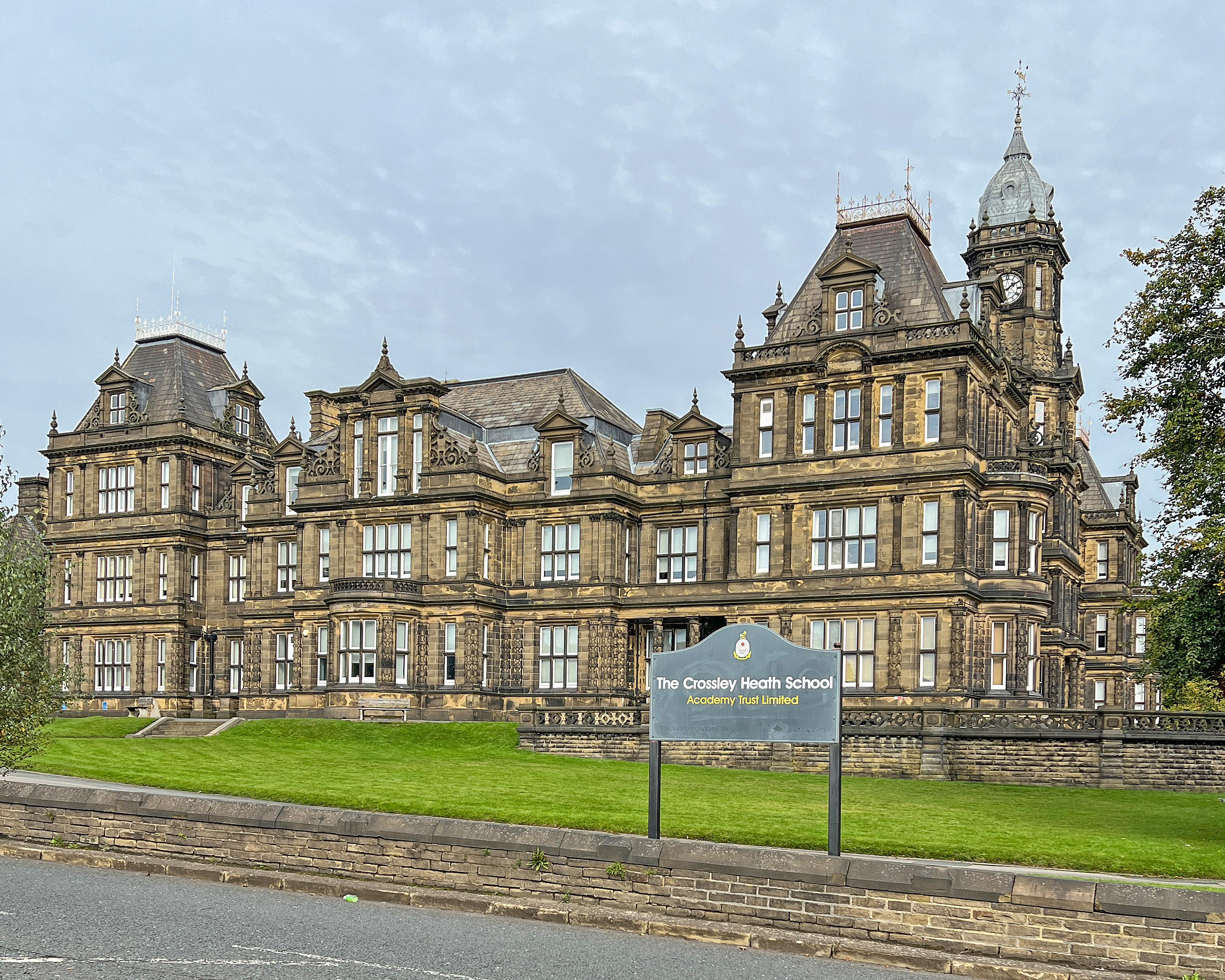
Crossley Heath School

=== Admission ===
The school entrance examination, administered jointly with North Halifax Grammar School, is the 11 plus, taken by prospective pupils in September of Year 6. The sixth form is not selective but, like other providers, has published entry requirements.

=== School catchment ===
The school has no formal catchment areas and draws pupils from a wide geographical area.

=== Languages ===
The school teaches French and German within a dedicated building. It also offers Mandarin Chinese to students.

=== Technology ===
In 2005 the school built a new technology block with five classrooms to accommodate graphics, electronics, resistant materials, textiles and food technology, and a dedicated music technology IT suite.

=== Sport ===
Sports teams are those for athletics, cross country, hockey, cricket, netball, football and rugby.

== Notable alumni ==
- James Ball (journalist) (1996–2004)

=== Heath Grammar School ===
- Andrew Watson, first black international footballer
- Frank Watson Dyson (1879–1886), astronomer who introduced the Greenwich Time Signal
- Matthew Smith (1890–1895), artist
- Leonard Bairstow (1891–1898), mathematician
- Eric Harrison (1918–1970), pianist
- Charles Illingworth CBE (1910–1917), Regius Professor of Surgery, Glasgow from 1939 to 1964
- Oliver Smithies (1936–1943), Nobel Prize in Physiology or Medicine in 2007
- Lindsay Clarke (1950–1957), novelist
- Barrie Ingham (1945–1952), actor
- Nick Lawrence, BBC presenter
- Barry Seal (1949–1956), Labour MEP for Yorkshire West from 1979 to 1999
- Andrew Wilkinson (1955–1962), president of the British Association of Perinatal Medicine from 1999 to 2002
- Paul Opacic, actor

=== Crossley and Porter School ===
- Brian Moore, British Lions and England Rugby Union international player

=== Crossley School ===
- Herbert Read DSO, MC (1893–1968), art critic, historian, poet, and anarchist

== Notable teachers ==
- Robin Pedley (1943–1946), history teacher at Crossley and Porter School

== The Crossley Heath School book ==
Crossley Heath School, written by Rose Taylor, Andrew Kafel and Russell Smith, covers the history of Heath School, and Crossley and Porter Schools which amalgamated to form the present Crossley Heath School. It contains images dating from the Victorian era to 2006, and some previously unpublished.

== See also ==
- Listed buildings in Halifax, West Yorkshire
