= Herbert Barrie =

Consultant paediatrician

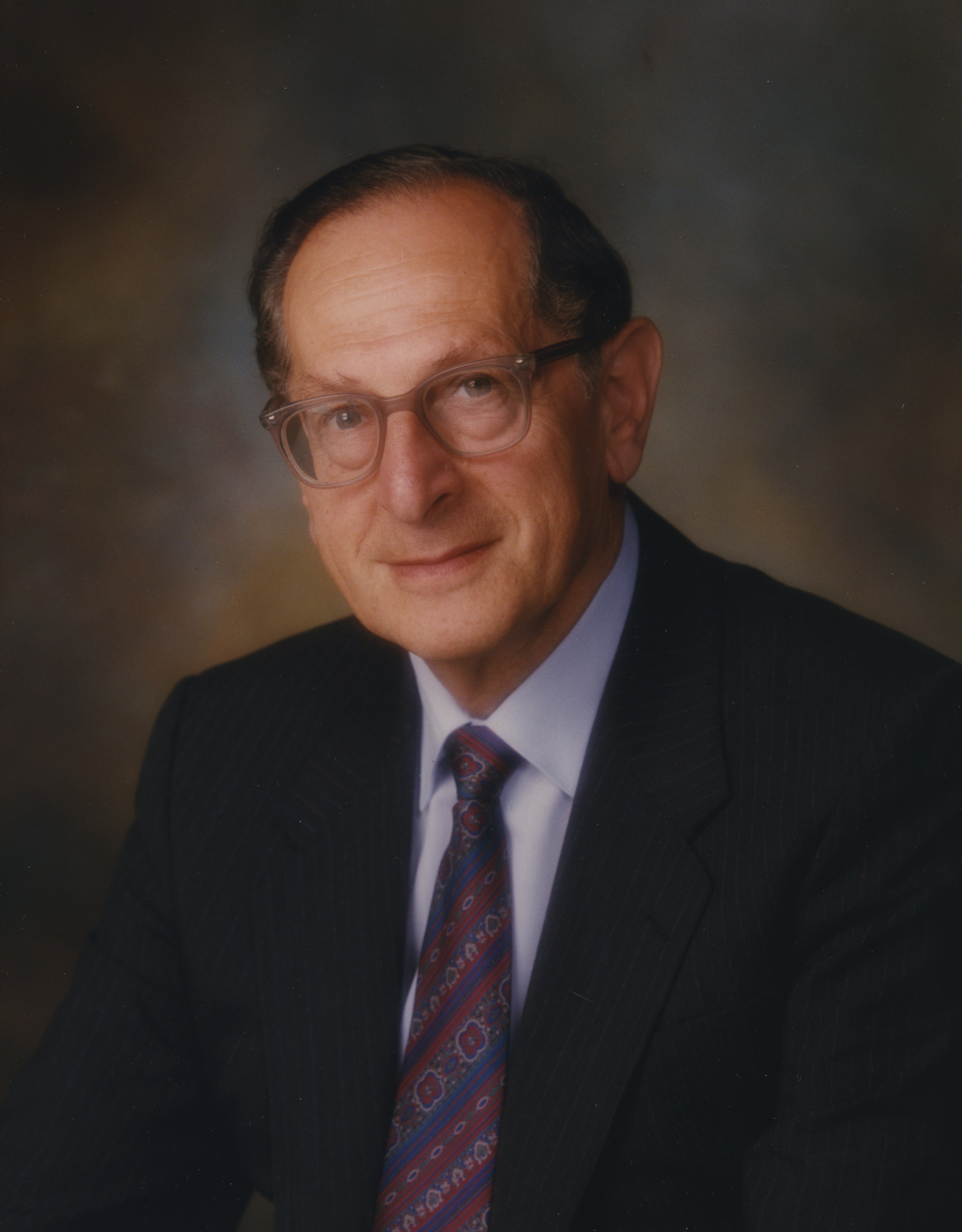
Dr Herbert Barrie (1927-2017)

Herbert Barrie (9 October 1927 – 20 March 2017), was a British consultant paediatrician and a leading figure in neonatology. He was a pioneer in the emerging specialty of paediatrics and neonatal medicine; and he developed one of the first neonatal intensive care units in London.

== Early life and education ==
He was born into a Jewish family in Germany, as Herbert Bihari; they emigrated to the United Kingdom in 1936. He was educated at Wallington County Grammar School, and entered University College Hospital Medical School. He qualified in 1950, and at that point changed his surname to Barrie.

== Career ==
In 1959, Barrie was appointed as a senior registrar, then five years later as a senior lecturer, at St Thomas' Hospital in London. It was here that he developed a profound interest in the care of premature infants. This was a time of rapid medical advances, particularly in respiratory support, that were at last making the survival of premature newborn babies a reality. Barrie pioneered advances in resuscitation of the newborn, publishing his seminal paper on the subject in The Lancet in 1963.

One of the concerns at this time was the worry that using high pressures of oxygen could be damaging to newborn lungs. Barrie developed an underwater safety valve in the oxygen circuit. The tubes were originally made of rubber, but these had the potential to cause irritation to sensitive newborn tracheas: Barrie switched to plastic, which was fashioned from a pre-cut roll and so had an inherent curvature. This plastic tube, based on his design, was known as the "St Thomas's tube".

In 1966, Barrie was appointed consultant paediatrician to Charing Cross Hospital in Fulham. He came in as colleague to Hugh Jolly, a relationship that was sometimes difficult. At Charing Cross, Barrie continued his ground-breaking and pioneering work in the care of the preterm infant. He ran a renowned department and built his special care baby unit (SCBU): this neonatal intensive care unit became a hot bed of innovation and expertise. It relocated to Chelsea and Westminster Hospital in 1993, and was expanded and redeveloped into a level 3 regional service in 2021. There is a plaque in the new NICU commemorating Barrie's vision and legacy.

At Charing Cross Hospital, Barrie was in charge of the paediatric research laboratory – here he conducted research into neonatal respiratory physiology and intensive care. He raised funds for an ambulance that could collect babies requiring intensive care from other hospitals and bring them back to Charing Cross; this was the first – and at the time the only – dedicated neonatal ambulance in the country. He was made head of the department of child health in 1983.

Barrie was an early member of the British Paediatric Association, which was to become the Royal College of Paediatrics and Child Health. He was a founder member of the Neonatal Society and the British Association of Perinatal Medicine.

== Book ==
Putting Tiny Patients First, a book edited and compiled by his son, describing Herbert Barrie's early life and his time in paediatrics, was published in 2018.
