= Neena Modi =

President of the Royal College of Paediatrics and Child Health

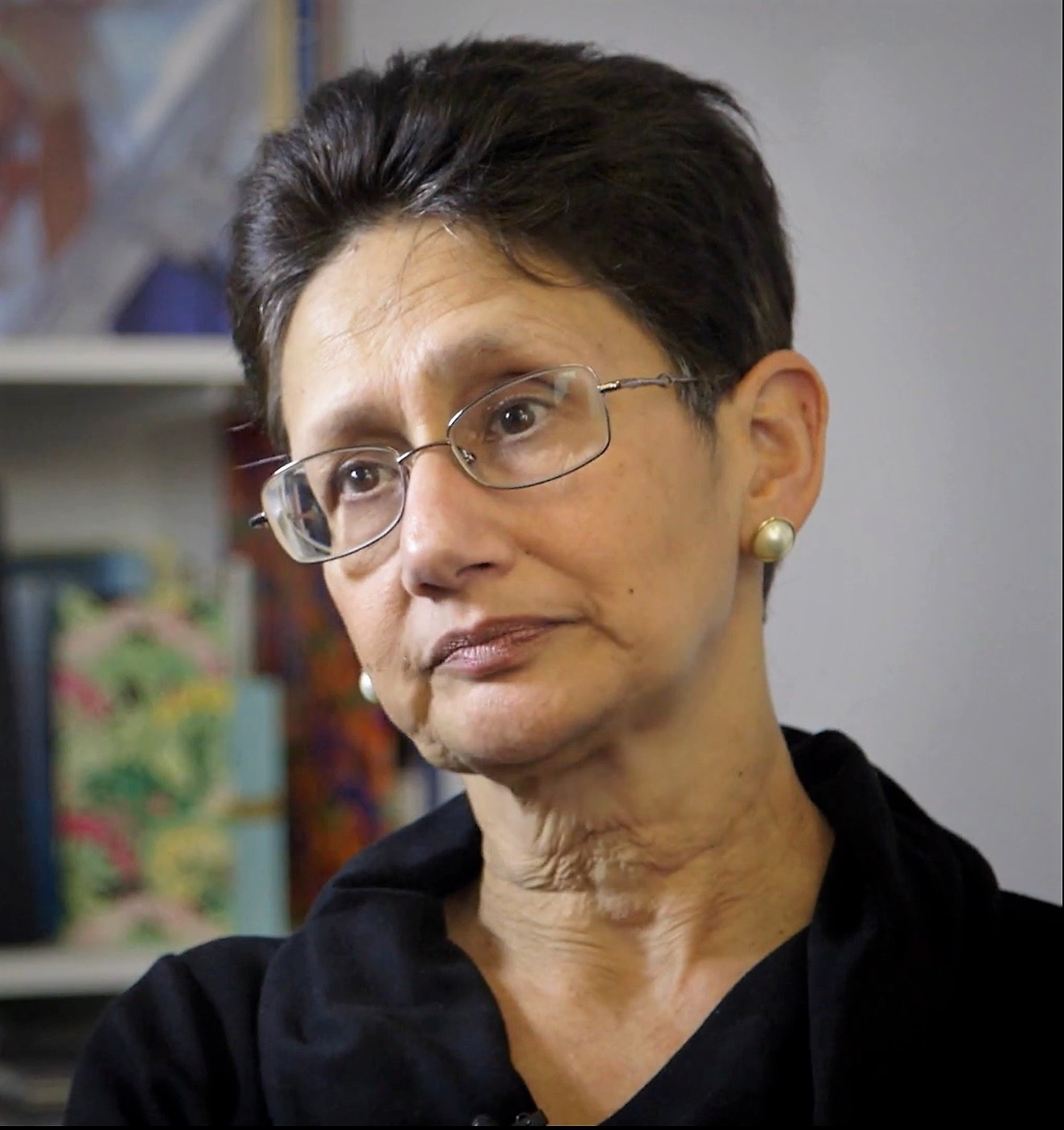
- Modi in Microbirth, 2015 documentary
- Education: University of Edinburgh
- Scientific career
- Workplaces: Imperial College London; Chelsea and Westminster Hospital

Neena Modi is a British physician and professor of neonatal medicine at Imperial College London. She is the current president of the UK Medical Women's Federation, and past president of the Royal College of Paediatrics and Child Health, serving in this role from April 2015 to April 2018. She is one of only four women to ever hold this position.

== Early life and education ==
Modi describes herself as coming from a multicultural background. She qualified from the University of Edinburgh. She undertook specialist training in neonatal medicine at University College Hospital London, and the University of Liverpool.

== Research and career ==
Modi is a Professor of Neonatal Medicine at Imperial College London. She is also an Honorary Consultant in Neonatal Medicine in Chelsea and Westminster NHS Foundation Trust. Moodi advocates for child health, gender equity, and equitable access to healthcare. She has called for lowering of the voting age to 16 years, and for the UK National Health Service to be restored as a primarily publicly funded and publicly delivered healthcare service.

A practicing clinician and academic lead of a multidisciplinary neonatal research program, Modi's research interests include nutritional and other perinatal determinants of lifelong metabolic health, medical ethics, and child health. In 2007 she led the establishment of the prize-winning UK National Neonatal Research Database. She now directs this national and international resource that contains detailed information on all admissions to neonatal units in England, Wales and Scotland, for research, quality improvement, audit, and surveillance. In 2012, she established the UK Neonatal Collaborative, with the aim of developing the use of clinical electronic data to support neonatal services and research. She directs the "Neonatal Update: the Science of Newborn Care" an annual weeklong international academic meeting held in London.

== Academic service ==
During her career she has served, among many other roles, as President of the UK Neonatal Society (2012-15), President of the Academic Paediatrics Association of Great Britain and Ireland (2014-15), chair of the British Medical Journal Ethics Committee [3] (2009-2015), and Chair of the NHS England Infant, Children and Young People Patient Safety Expert Group (2010-2014). During her tenure as Vice President for Research at the Royal College of Paediatrics and Child Health (2009-2014), she was lead author on the RCPCH Turning the Tide report highlighting the need to strengthen child health research in the UK.

She was elected as President of the Royal College of Paediatrics and Child Health in December 2014, taking up the role on 29 April 2015. Her 3-year term ended in 2018. She is a fellow of the Royal College of Physicians (London), Royal College of Paediatrics and Child Health and Academy of Medical Sciences. She was awarded honorary fellowship of the Faculty of Pharmaceutical Medicine in 2017 and the British Association of Perinatal Medicine in 2015. She was elected a Fellow of the Academy of Medical Sciences in 2020.

In 2021, Modi became President of the British Medical Association.

== Personal life ==
Modi is married and has two children.

== Publications ==
- Mills L, Modi N (July 2015). "Clinician enteral feeding preferences for very preterm babies in the UK". Archives of Disease in Childhood: Fetal and Neonatal Edition. 100 (4): F372–3. doi:10.1136/archdischild-2014-308110. PMID 25956669. S2CID 29900942.
- Parkinson JR, Hyde MJ, Gale C, Santhakumaran S, Modi N (April 2013). "Preterm birth and the metabolic syndrome in adult life: a systematic review and meta-analysis". Pediatrics. 131 (4): e1240–63. doi:10.1542/peds.2012-2177. PMID 23509172. S2CID 2021871.
- Battersby C, Santhalingam T, Costeloe K, Modi N (January 2018). "Incidence of neonatal necrotising enterocolitis in high-income countries: a systematic review". Archives of Disease in Childhood: Fetal and Neonatal Edition. 103 (2): F182–F189. doi:10.1136/archdischild-2017-313880. hdl:10044/1/57073. PMID 29317459. S2CID 206861623.
- Achana F, Petrou S, Khan K, Gaye A, Modi N (January 2018). "A methodological framework for assessing agreement between cost-effectiveness outcomes estimated using alternative sources of data on treatment costs and effects for trial-based economic evaluations". The European Journal of Health Economics. 19 (1): 75–86. doi:10.1007/s10198-017-0868-8. PMC 5773681. PMID 28180977.
- Modi N, Clark H, Wolfe I, Costello A, Budge H, Goodier R, Hyde MJ, Lumsden D, Prayle A, Roland D (January 2013). "A healthy nation: strengthening child health research in the UK". Lancet. 381 (9860): 73–87. doi:10.1016/S0140-6736(12)61818-2. PMID 23176802. S2CID 205967699.
