= Norman Long =

Norman Long may refer to:

- Norman Long (anthropologist)
- Norman Long (entertainer)
