= Arthur Bell (physician) =

British consultant paediatrician

Arthur Bell DM FRCP
- Born: Arthur Doyne Courtenay Bell; 15 June 1909; Prestwich, Lancashire
- Died: 16 September 1970 (aged 70); Canonbury,
- Citizenship: British
- Education: King's College School; Gresham's School; St John's College, Oxford; St Thomas's Hospital
- Years active: 1928–1966
- Medical career
- Profession: Physician
- Institutions: St Thomas's Hospital; Harley Street; Charing Cross Hospital; Belgrave Hospital for Children; Queen Mary's Hospital for the East End
- Sub-specialties: consultant paediatrician
- Research: Pyloromyotomy

Arthur Doyne Courtenay Bell (15 June 1900 – 16 September 1970) was a British physician and consultant paediatrician.

To his friends he was known as DB.

== Early life ==
Born at Prestwich, Lancashire, Bell was the son of Robert Arthur Bell, a consulting engineer and mathematician, and his wife Evelyn Maud Richardson, and was related through his father’s family to Thomas Sydenham, a 17th-century physician. He was also related to the antiquary Doyne Courtenay Bell (1830―1888).

Bell was baptized into the Church of England at the Church of St Mary the Virgin, Prestwich, on 29 July 1900, and had five sisters and a brother. Before he was born, the family had lived at Cuddalore in the Madras Presidency of British India and in Dinton, Wiltshire. By 1911 it had moved to a 14-room house in Wimbledon, Surrey, and had three servants.

The young Bell was educated at King's College School, Gresham's School, St John's College, Oxford, where he held a scholarship and was Adrian Graves Memorial Exhibitioner, and St Thomas's Hospital, graduating M.B.Ch.B. and being admitted as M.R.C.S. and L.R.C.P. in 1928.

Bell's older brother David Courtenay Bell, an officer in the Royal Navy, died on 6 July 1918, aged 23, while on duty in HMS C25 during the First World War. By then, their parents were living at Waldegrave Park, Strawberry Hill.

== Career ==
Bell served his pre-registration years as a house physician and anaesthetist at St Thomas's Hospital, and in 1931 published with G. H. Fitzgibbon a paper on pyloromyotomy, "The Rammstedt operation for treatment of congenital hypertrophic pyloric stenosis: a statistical review of results". In that year, he was awarded a valuable Perkins travelling fellowship to study in Vienna and Berlin.

On his return to England in 1932, Bell was appointed as chief assistant in the children’s department at St Thomas's Hospital. He was admitted M.R.C.P. in 1933. By 1934, the address given for him in The Medical Directory was 120, Harley Street, and in 1938 the University of Oxford awarded him the degree of D.M. During the second world war, he was in charge of the children’s department at the London Hospital. He was also paediatric consultant in Sector II of the Emergency medical services and medical officer to the Heavy Reserve Squad in the City of Westminster.

In 1945, Bell joined the staff of the Charing Cross Hospital and also became physician at the Belgrave Hospital for Children and an honorary physician to the children's department of Queen Mary's Hospital for the East End of London.

In 1949 he was elected a Fellow of the Royal College of Physicians. He was also appointed as Examiner in Medicine and Child Health at the Royal College.

Bell retired from the staff of the Charing Cross Hospital in 1965, and from its board of governors the next year. He was replaced at Charing Cross Hospital by Herbert Barrie. Bell died in 1970, while living in Canonbury.

== Character and private life ==
An obituary noted that Bell never patronized or talked down to children and would discuss their cases with them "as gravely as if they were distinguished colleagues". A clubman and bon vivant, he had a genial manner and was elected chairman of the Savile Club. He played golf, was a fly-fisherman, and in later life took up painting in oils, exhibiting work at the Royal Academy.
