= Expectation fulfilment theory of dreaming =

Psychologist Joe Griffin's theory of dreaming

The expectation fulfilment theory of dreaming, proposed by psychologist Joe Griffin in 1993, posits that the prime function of dreams, during REM sleep, is to act out metaphorically non-discharged emotional arousals (expectations) that were not expressed during the previous day. It theorises that excessive worrying (regarded as unintentional misuse of the imagination) arouses the autonomic nervous system, which increases the need to dream during REM sleep. This deprives the individual of the refreshment of the mind and body brought about by regenerative slow-wave sleep.

== REM sleep ==
Everyone has periods of rapid eye movement (REM) sleep every night, a phase lasting about 90 minutes. This is when most dreaming occurs. Overall, REM sleep usually accounts for up to two hours of sleep time and most people can remember their dreams only if woken directly from REM sleep.

It is known from laboratory studies of brain waves that, just before entering REM sleep and while in it, powerful electrical signals pass through the brain. On electroencephalogram recordings, these appear as spikes and are known as PGO spikes, after the initials of names of the structures of the brain they pass through. These same spikes occur during waking, when attention is drawn to a stimulus, the phenomenon being known as ‘the orientation response’. While sleeping, the spikes appear to represent the cue to dream.

== Dreaming in metaphor ==
Metaphor is the language of the REM state. French scientist Michel Jouvet suggested that REM sleep is concerned with programming the central nervous system to carry out instinctive behaviours. William Dement and colleagues discovered that the amount of REM sleep a foetus or newborn has depends on how mature an animal is at birth. Animals born relatively mature have little REM sleep as foetuses and after birth, while animals born immature have a considerable amount.

== Dreaming and depression ==
It is well known that depressed people spend far more of their sleep time in REM sleep than non-depressed people, entering it earlier – and it has been shown, experimentally, that depressed people show improvement when deprived of REM sleep. This accords with Griffin’s theory, as depressed people spend much of their waking time arousing themselves physiologically through rumination and worry. All this arousal has to be discharged in dreams. Dreaming takes up a large amount of the brain’s energy, as the PGO spikes are continually firing, so depressed people tend to wake early but exhausted and lacking in motivation, setting the scene for more worry and distress the following day. (This has been termed the cycle of depression.) The expectation fulfilment theory of dreaming is used by Human Givens therapists to help people see the need to stop worrying and introspecting and to focus on productive ways to meet unmet needs instead.

== Conclusions ==
While the theory has widely been validated anecdotally, through people’s personal experience, it is not able to be put to rigorous scientific testing, as interpretations of dream events are necessarily subjective. However, Griffin, by tracking through historical data, claims that the expectation fulfilment theory of dreaming provides a far more plausible explanation for two famous dreams interpreted by of Freud and Jung.

Objectively, the theory fulfils the criteria for a satisfactory explanation of dreaming put forward by eminent sleep researcher Professor Bill Domhoff in a special issue of Behavioral and Brain Sciences, devoted to examining the most commonly promoted dream theories. Professor Domhoff, who did not consider the expectation fulfilment theory of dreaming in his review, wrote:

If the methodologically most sound descriptive empirical findings were to be used as a starting point for future dream theorising, the picture would look like this:

1. Dreaming is a cognitive achievement that develops throughout childhood;
2. There is a forebrain network for dream generation that is most often triggered by brainstem activation;
3. Much of dream content is coherent, consistent over time and continuous with past or present emotional concerns.

He also concluded that none of the theories he had reviewed encompassed all three of these "well-grounded" conclusions.
