= John Randall (public servant) =

John Randall, CBE, is a former president of the National Union of Students, a position he held between 1973 and 1975. He was educated at Wallington County Grammar School and the University of York. From 1987 to 1997 he was director, professional standards and development of the Law Society of England and Wales. From 1997 to 2001 he was chief executive of the Quality Assurance Agency for Higher Education. Since 2001, he has worked as an independent consultant on higher education and professional training. He was chair of the Justice Sector Skills Council (Skills for Justice) for six years until 2010. From 2004 to 2015 he chaired the Police Negotiating Board. He retired in 2018.

== Awards ==
He was appointed Commander of the Order of the British Empire (CBE) in the 2015 New Year Honours.
