= Maureen Young =

British professor of perinatal physiology

- Born: 16 October 1915; Southwold, England
- Died: 2013 (aged 97–98)
- Education: Bedford College for Women
- Occupation: Perinatal physiologist
- Known for: Neonatal research

Maureen Young (16 October 1915 – 2013), was a British professor of perinatal physiology at St Thomas's Hospital Medical School, London.

== Early life ==
Young was born on 16 October 1915 in Southwold, England. Her mother Ina Heslop was Irish and her father William Young was an English military physician during World War I. After the war, he was appointed to the pathology department at Guy's Hospital in London, and the family to relocated there. When Young was 11, her parents were reassigned, this time to Singapore, so Maureen and her brother Ian were sent to boarding schools.

From 1932 to 1938, Young attended Bedford College for Women in London, first studying for a general degree involving chemistry, physics, botany and zoology, and then earning a BSc in physiology in 1938. She had to retake her first year, as she failed physics. In the summers of 1937 and 1938, Young went to Germany to learn German. Following graduation, she found employment at the college as a demonstrator and later as an assistant lecturer in physiology.

== Career ==
During World War II, Young's Bedford College department was evacuated from London, which was under attack, to the Physiological Laboratory at Cambridge where she met Sir Joseph Barcroft (1872–1947). Because of his advancing age, Barcroft needed someone with better vision and finer manual skills to cannulate the tiny vessels. Young was able to do so, thus beginning her lifelong fascination with feto-placental physiology.

In 1946 after the war's conclusion, Young was recruited to work at St Thomas' Hospital Medical School as a demonstrator in physiology as well as a tutor to assist the newly admitted female students. The need for such tutoring was significant as London's medical schools had not enrolled any women before the war, but after the war the schools were required to admit women as 15 percent of incoming classes.

The years that followed were rewarding for Young.

This was a most exciting time, and the most productive period of Maureen's illustrious career, for the phenomenon of the Small for Gestational Age baby had just been realised. Given complete scientific freedom, Maureen and colleagues conducted a series of innovative studies investigating transfer of amino acids across the placenta, and the effects of insulin on protein turnover in developing tissues. These involved various models, including the guinea pig, sheep and rabbit, and perfusion of the placenta in situ. She became pre-eminent in her chosen field, ending her career as Professor of Perinatal Physiology at St Thomas' in 1982.

She had helped found the Blair Bell Research Society as well as the Neonatal Society of which she was president from 1984 to 1987.

== Later years ==
In retirement, Young pursued her passion for travel and visited many countries, often alone. She lived in the small village of Toft, outside Cambridge, where she would welcome visitors and researchers to her home. She continued to attend university gatherings that studied the placenta, and attended her last professional meeting when she was 96 years old.

Young died in 2013.
