= Newham University Hospital =

- Barts Health NHS Trust
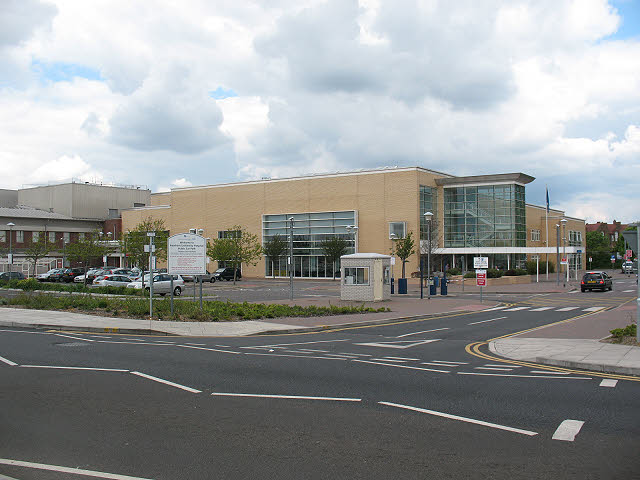
- Main entrance

- Location within Newham

Geography
- Location: Glen Road, Plaistow E13 8SL, London, England
- Coordinates: 51.5230°N 0.0361°E

Organisation
- Care system: National Health Service
- Type: Teaching
- Affiliated university: Barts and The London School of Medicine and Dentistry

Services
- Emergency department: Yes
- Beds: 340

History
- Founded: 14 December 1983; 42 years ago (replaced Queen Mary's Hospital for the East End and East Ham Memorial Hospital)

Links
- Website: www.bartshealth.nhs.uk/newham

Newham University Hospital is an acute general hospital situated in Plaistow in the London Borough of Newham. It is managed by Barts Health NHS Trust.

== History ==
The hospital was built to replace Queen Mary's Hospital for the East End in Stratford and East Ham Memorial Hospital and was opened by the Queen as Newham General Hospital on 14 December 1983. A maternity department was added in 1985. The second phase of the hospital development, which introduced additional maternity beds, a special care baby unit, a rehabilitation department and an academic centre was opened by Diana, Princess of Wales on 18 February 1986. A women's centre and an ambulatory care centre were added in 2000. The hospital's name was changed to Newham University Hospital in 2004.

The Gateway Surgical Centre, which includes 39 beds, a renal unit and three operating theatres, opened in 2005. In 2012 the accident and emergency department was reconfigured to benefit from Pearson Lloyd's redesign, "A Better A&E", which reduced aggression against hospital staff by 50%.

== Health tourism ==
A check on 1,497 maternity patients at the hospital in 2017 found that 17 were not entitled to free NHS treatment and billed them £104,706.

== Transport ==
London Buses routes 104, 147, 262, 276, 304, 376 and 473 serve the hospital. The nearest train stations are Plaistow and Upton Park on the District and Hammersmith & City lines of the London Underground and Prince Regent on the Docklands Light Railway. Limited parking for automobiles is available in the hospital together with disabled spaces.

== Patient entertainment ==
Bedrock Radio (a registered charity established in 2002) provide a community health (hospital radio) service across East London, South Essex and immediate surrounding areas. Bedrock Radio began serving Barts Health Trust in November 2022 when Whipps Cross Hospital Radio (WXHR) closed down.

== See also ==
- Healthcare in London
- List of hospitals in England
