= Philip Yea =

British businessman

- Born: Philip Edward Yea; 11 December 1954 (age 71)
- Education: Wallington County Grammar School
- Alma mater: Brasenose College, Oxford
- Occupation: Businessman
- Known for: CEO, 3i Group plc, 2005–09
- Spouse: Married
- Children: 3

Philip Edward Yea (born 11 December 1954) is a British businessman and private equity investor, and the chairman of Equiniti and Mondi plc. He is a non-executive director of Aberdeen Standard Asia Focus plc and Marshall of Cambridge (Holdings) Ltd.

He is a former chairman of Greene King plc (2016 to 2019) and bwin.party digital entertainment plc (2014 to 2016). He was chairman of the trustees at the British Heart Foundation from 2009 to 2015, and was an independent trustee director of The Francis Crick Institute during its formation (2011 to 2018). Prior to this, he was chief executive of 3i Group plc, from 2005 to January 2009. Yea was a non-executive director of Vodafone Group plc from 2005 to 2017 and senior business adviser to Prince Andrew, Duke of York. between 2009 and 2014. In 2008, he was ranked 41st in The Times Power 100 list, a list which rates the most powerful people in British business.

== Early life ==
He attended Wallington County Grammar School and later obtained a degree in Modern Languages (French and Spanish) from Brasenose College, Oxford.

== Career ==
Yea joined 3i in July 2004, after a career spanning both public and private companies, having been a managing director at Investcorp, where his main focus was on the performance of portfolio investments. He joined Investcorp in 1999 from Diageo. He spent six years as group finance director, both at Guinness and then at Diageo after Guinness's merger with Grand Metropolitan in 1997. Yea's thirteen-year career at Guinness/Diageo mainly involved financial positions but also saw him in a number of wider-ranging roles including the chairmanship of The Gleneagles Hotel and Guinness Publishing. He was also a director of Moët Hennessy. He has also been a non-executive director of HBOS plc and of Manchester United plc.

Yea is a member of the Chartered Institute of Management Accountants.

== Personal life ==
He is married with three children.
