= Peter Dunn (paediatrician) =

British paediatrician (1929–2021)

Professor Peter Dunn FRCP FRCOG FRCPCH
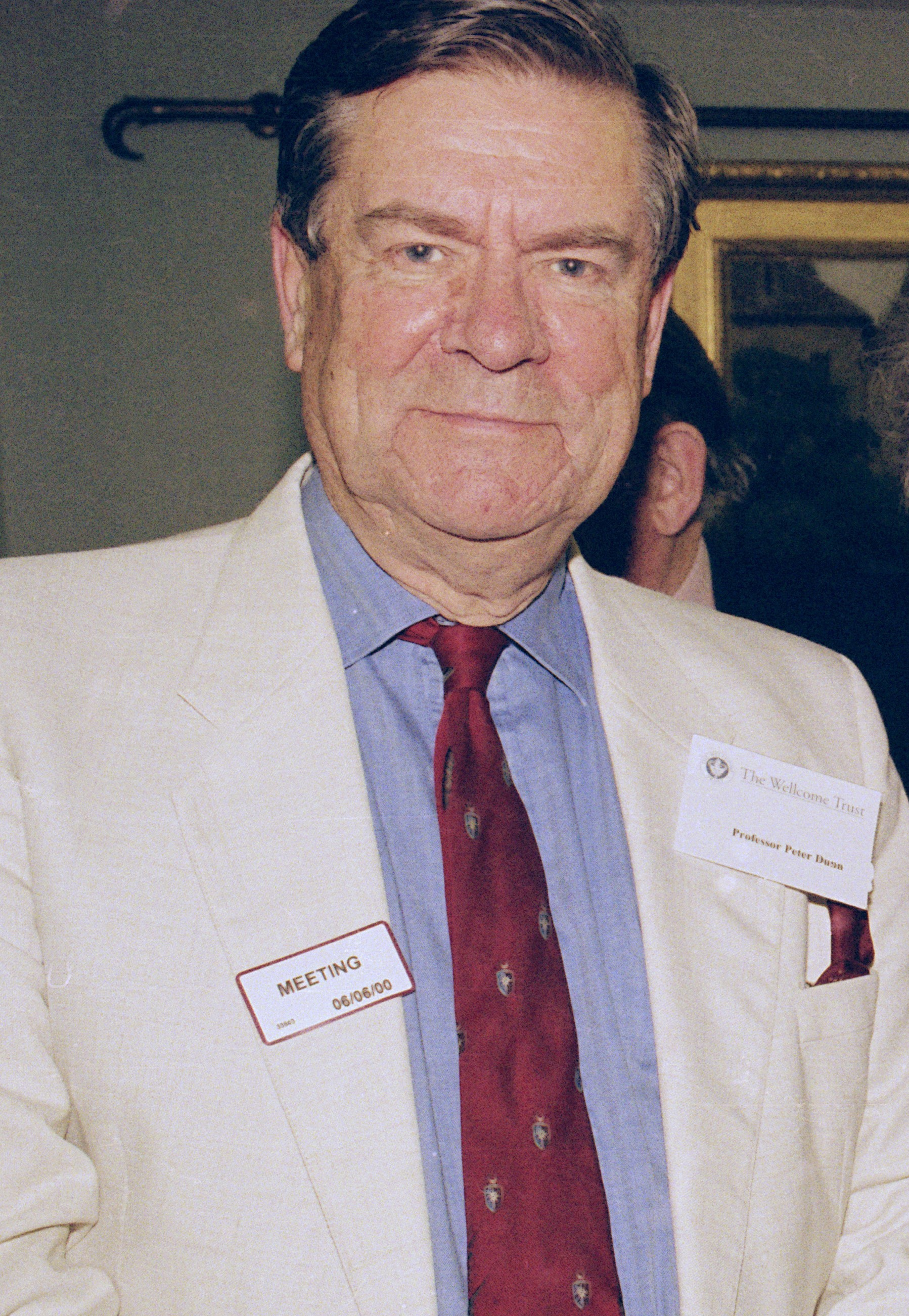
- Born: 23 June 1929; Birmingham, England
- Died: 2 February 2021 (aged 91); Bristol, England
- Known for: Founding the British Association of Perinatal Medicine
- Awards: James Spence Medal 2002
- Scientific career
- Fields: Neonatology, Perinatal Medicine
- Website: Bristol Clinical Science People

Peter MacNaughton Dunn (23 June 1929 – 2 February 2021) was an English paediatrician. Dunn was most notable for introducing into the UK the Gregory box in 1971, that provides Continuous positive airway pressure in the treatment of infant respiratory distress syndrome of the newborn and conducting research into Hip dysplasia and fetal adaptation to extrauterine life. Dunn was also notable for being known for founding the charity association British Association of Perinatal Medicine.

== Life ==
Dunn was educated at Marlborough College before matriculating at St John's College University of Cambridge to study medicine, attaining a degree in 1953 and undertook training in perinatal medicine in Birmingham, San Francisco and Bristol. He died peacefully on 2 February 2021.

== Career ==
He led Bristol University's neonatal service from 1969 to 1988, and was later emeritus professor of perinatal medicine and senior research fellow there.

He was the founder, in 1976, and inaugural president, from 1980 to 1984, of the British Association of Perinatal Medicine, and was a consultant to the World Health Organization from 1970 to 1990.

Research into congenital hip dislocation, led to him being awarded the British Orthopaedic Association's Gold Medal, and for work on fetal adaptation to extrauterine life he received the De Snoo-van’t Hoogerhuigs Medal and Prize. He was the Royal College of Paediatrics and Child Health's James Spence Medalist for 2001.
