= Harold Gamsu =

Harold Gamsu FRCP, FRCPCH
- Born: Harold Richard Gamsu; 23 January 1931; Windhoek, Namibia
- Died: 31 August 2004 (aged 73)

Harold Richard Gamsu (1931–2004) was a neonatologist.

Gamsu was born in Windhoek, Namibia, on 23 January 1931. His father, a Russian Jewish émigré, Barnet Isaac Gamsu, was a businessman.

He attended Windhoek High School, and then studied at the University of Witwatersrand, graduating in 1954.

He continued training in paediatrics at the University of Sheffield and Cleveland Metropolitan General Hospital.

In 1965 he obtained a position as Wates Fellow at King's College Hospital, and was Reader in Neonatal Paediatrics and Director of the Regional Neonatal Unit there from 1979, and Professor of Neonatology from 1994. Upon his retirement in 1995, he became Emeritus.

He served as honorary secretary of the British Association of Perinatal Medicine from 1980 to 1983.

He died on 31 August 2004.
