= Ivan Tyrrell =

British educator, writer and artist

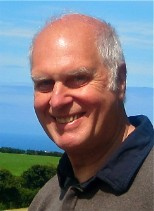
- Born: 18 October 1943 (age 82); London, England, United Kingdom
- Occupations: Writer, Educator, Director of Human Givens College
- Children: 4
- Writing career
- Subjects: Psychology, psychotherapy, and the origin of creativity, mysticism and mental illness.

Ivan Tyrrell (/ˈtɪrəl/; born 18 October 1943) is a British educator, writer, and artist. He lives with his wife Véronique in the Cotswolds, England.

== Art ==
Tyrrell left Wallington County Grammar School to study art as an apprentice at F.G. Marshal in 1959. In 1962, he began a fine arts course at Croydon Art College, and was taught painting by Bridget Riley, Barry Fantoni, and John Hoyland, among others. He left college disillusioned with the art world and worked in London advertising studios before setting up a graphic design company in 1971 on the South Coast in Sussex.

Two silk-screen posters produced with fellow artist Frederick Carver featured in Les Sixties, a Paris exhibition of psychedelic art that then transferred to the Brighton Festival and... “the spectral, hallucinatory scenarios of J. G. Ballard, especially in his novel The Crystal World – bodied forth in Tyrrell’s apocalyptic poster design."

In 1965 Tyrrell, whilst still a student, had met the writer, Idries Shah, who had begun introducing ideas from the Sufi tradition into the Western world. In 1969 Tyrrell was invited to attend regular gatherings of writers, poets, actors, businessmen, diplomats, academics, craftsmen and others at Shah's home in Kent.

He joined The Institute for Cultural Research in 1970. In 1977 Tyrrell art-directed thirty-six illustrators for the first edition of World Tales by Idries Shah, as well as contributing some illustrations himself.

== Psychology ==
In 1987 he closed his graphic design service due to the recession and began learning about psychotherapy. From what he learned, Tyrrell came to believe most psychotherapists were poorly trained and had little basic knowledge of psychology.

=== Human Givens Journal ===
In 1993, encouraged by the psychiatrist and writer Robin Skynner, author Doris Lessing, psychologist Joe Griffin and Idries Shah, he launched a journal, The Therapist, in an attempt to increase the scientific rigour of the field. Medical journalist Denise Winn was appointed Editor in 1997 and Ivan Tyrrell became General Editor. In 2000 its name was changed to Human Givens, to reflect the growing interest in the human givens approach to psychotherapy, behaviour and education that he was developing with Griffin. Human Givens is now the official journal of the Human Givens Institute. The journal gave Tyrrell the opportunity of publishing interviews with people whose ideas interested him, such as Richard Bentall, Doris Lessing, Robin Skynner, Margaret Heffernan, John Cacioppo, and many others.

=== Teaching ===
Tyrrell began teaching courses in psychology and psychotherapy in 1996, and is now director with Joe Griffin of Human Givens College. The Griffin/Tyrrell collaboration contributed to psychotherapy and consciousness studies and publications.

== Publications ==
- Hypnosis and Trance States: The first explanation of hypnosis from an evolutionary perspective. (1998) Co-author: Griffin, J. Organising Idea Monograph, No.1. European Therapy Studies Institute. ISBN 1-899398-90-2.
- Psychotherapy and the Human Givens. (1998) Co-author: Griffin, J. Organising Idea Monograph, No.2. European Therapy Studies Institute. ISBN 1-899398-95-3.
- Breaking the Cycle of Depression: The connection between depression and dreaming and what it means for psychotherapy. (1999) Co-author: Griffin, J. Organising Idea Monograph, No.3. European Therapy Studies Institute.
- The APET model: patterns in the brain. (2000) Co-author: Griffin, J. Organising Idea Monograph, No.4. European Therapy Studies Institute. ISBN 1-899398-06-6.
- The Shackled Brain: How to release locked in patterns of psychological trauma. (2000) Co-author: Griffin, J. Organising Idea Monograph, No.5. European Therapy Studies Institute. ISBN 1-899398-11-2.
- Griffin, J. & Tyrrell, I. (2004). Dreaming Reality: How dreaming keeps us sane, or can drive us mad. Human Givens Publishing. ISBN 1-899398-36-8
- Griffin, J. & Tyrrell, I. (2004). How to lift depression fast. Human Givens Publishing. ISBN 1-899398-41-4
- Griffin, J. & Tyrrell, I. (2005). Freedom from addiction: The secret behind successful addiction busting. Human Givens Publishing. ISBN 1-899398-46-5
- Griffin, J. & Tyrrell, I. (2007). An Idea in Practice: using the human givens approach. Human Givens Publishing. ISBN 978-1-899398-96-6.
- Griffin, J. & Tyrrell, I. (2007). How to master anxiety: Stress, panic attacks, phobias, psychological trauma and more. Human Givens Publishing. ISBN 1-899398-81-3
- Griffin, J. & Tyrrell, I. (2008). Release from anger: Practical help for controlling unreasonable rage. Human Givens Publishing. ISBN 978-1-899398-07-2
- Griffin, J. & Tyrrell, I. (2013). Why We Dream: The Definitive Answer. Human Givens Publishing. ISBN 978-1899398423.
- Griffin, J. & Tyrrell, I. (2013). Human Givens: The New Approach to Emotional Health and Clear Thinking. Human Givens Publishing. ISBN 1-899398-31-7

== Books ==
- The Survival Option: A guide to living through nuclear war. (1982) Jonathan Cape, ISBN 0-224-02059-5.
- The Human Givens: A new approach to emotional health and clear thinking. (2003) Co-author: Griffin, J. HG Publishing, ISBN 1-899398-31-7.
- Dreaming Reality: How dreaming keeps us sane, or can drive us mad. (2004) Co-author: Griffin, J. HG Publishing, ISBN 1-899398-36-8.
- How to lift depression...fast. (2004) Co-author: Griffin, J. HG Publishing, ISBN 1-899398-41-4.
- Freedom from addiction: The secret behind successful addiction busting. (2005) Co-author: Griffin, J. HG Publishing, ISBN 1-899398-46-5
- Back from the brink: Coping with stress. (2005) Co-author: Leeson, N. Virgin Books, ISBN 0-7535-1075-8.
- Godhead, The Brain’s Big Bang: The explosive origin of creativity, mysticism and mental illness. (2011) Co-author: Griffin, J. HG Publishing, ISBN 978-1-899398-27-0
- Listening to Idries Shah: How Understanding Can Grow. (2016) HG Publishing, ISBN 978-1-899398-08-9.
