= Queen Mary's Hospital for the East End =

Hospital in London, England

- North East Metropolitan Regional Health Board
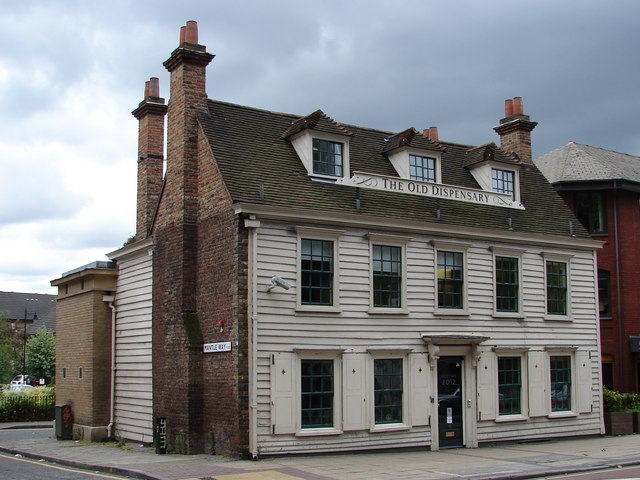
- The Old Dispensary, Stratford

- Location within Newham

Geography
- Location: Stratford, London, England, United Kingdom
- Coordinates: 51°32′31.47″N 0°0′19″E

Organisation
- Care system: NHS England

History
- Founded: 1861
- Closed: 1983

Links
- Lists: Hospitals in England

Queen Mary's Hospital for the East End is a former hospital on Bryant Street in Stratford, London.

== History ==
The hospital was formed as the West Ham, Stratford and South Essex Dispensary, opened in July 1861 by local doctor William Elliot in what became known as the Old Dispensary, an 18th-century building at 30 Romford Road. This was lent to him by Mrs Mary Curtis, a resident of Stratford - now Grade II listed, it survives and is now the head office of activeNewham. Mrs Curtis donated a plot of land for a new dispensary soon afterwards, whilst her husband donated a quarter of its £4,000 construction cost. The two-storey new dispensary opened in 1879 – its motto was "Ohne Zaegern und ohne Zagen" ("Without hesitation or fear").

A hospital was added beside the new dispensary - Prince George, Duke of Cambridge laid the foundation stone in 1888 and the hospital was opened by Hugh Grosvenor, 1st Duke of Westminster two years later, with its land, building and furnishings costing a total of £7,000. It operated as a 32-bed accident unit with five resident and visiting doctors, three consulting surgeons, a matron, four nurses and two probationers to save the long journey to the London Hospital in the East End of London, whilst the Old Dispensary became its outpatients department.

John Passmore Edwards donated £3,000 to the costs of a new 24-bed wing, laid its foundation stone in February 1894 and opened it 14 months later. Formerly called the West Ham, Stratford and South Essex Hospital and Dispensary, the overall complex was renamed West Ham Hospital in 1895, the West Ham and East London General Hospital in 1902 and the West Ham and Eastern General Hospital in 1909.

Another extension was added in 1907, with a foundation stone laid by the Duchess of Marlborough. Legacies from Rudolph Zunz and Joseph Withers enabled the opening of two new wards in 1911, bringing the hospital up from 60 to 100 beds. By the time of the First World War it had 110 beds and 50 of these were initially offered for army use (later rising to 80 in 1916), leading to an affiliation with the Royal Herbert Hospital in Woolwich. Queen Mary became its patron in 1916 and it was granted a royal charter the following year, changing its name to its final one.

The hospital joined the National Health Service under the management of the North East Metropolitan Regional Health Board in 1948. After services were transferred to Newham General Hospital, it closed in 1983. All its buildings were demolished except an entrance archway, which was restored in 2022. The site is now a housing estate.
