= Norman Long (anthropologist) =

British social scientist (born 1936)

Norman Long (born 1936) is a British anthropologist. He has conducted important fieldwork and made significant theoretical contributions through his application of insights from social anthropology in development studies. Anthropology was, in the wake of decolonisation, often seen as tainted by colonialism and not relevant in development discourse. Long offered another perspective that was unbound by time and place. He advocated an actor-oriented perspective on development and thus formulated a critique on centralist biases in development theory.

== Education and early life ==
Norman Long grew up in Surrey, UK, and attended Wallington County Grammar School (1950–55). He also studied music at the Trinity College of Music in London (1948-1955). He entered the University of Leeds after completing British National Service with the Royal Air Force in Malaya (1955-1957). He gained a bachelor's degree in anthropology, philosophy, and biblical studies in 1960. During 1960-1962, he embarked on postgraduate studies in social anthropology and sociology in Manchester. He was supported by a State Studentship Research Scholarship. A Commonwealth Scholarship supported further his Ph.D. research. This allowed him to become research affiliate of the Rhodes-Livingstone Institute (now Institute for African Studies, University of Zambia): March 1962-February 1964. He defended his Ph.D successfully in 1967 at the University of Manchester. He is married to Ann Long, an educational psychologist. She supported his work significantly during fieldwork and later as editor.

== Academic appointments ==
- March 1964–September 1972: University of Manchester; Research associate and later lecturer in Social Anthropology;
- October 1972–August 1981: Durham University; reader and later professor of social anthropology;
- September 1981–December 1993 and January 1994–August 1995: Wageningen Agricultural University: professor in sociology of development with special attention to rural contexts (various definitions of the chair over time).

Other appointments include: 1967–68: University of Zambia; 1993–1995: University of Bath; Temporary attachments in Latin America: Peru and Mexico. Attachmenst after retirement: Emeritus Professor Wageningen; Adjunct Professor: Chinese Agricultural University; Honorary Research Professor, University of Leeds

He was awards a Doctor Honoris Causa, Universidad Nacional del Centro Peru/Huancayo (1995).

== Intellectual background ==
Norman Long was the last representative of a group of scholars at the Rhodes Livingstone Institute in Lusaka who later formed the core of the Manchester School of Anthropology. He defended his Ph.D. under Max Gluckman, a former director of RLI, in Manchester. These scholars were empirical in orientation and observed actual behaviour instead of reported social structures. As a result they observed kinship in action instead of accepting kinship as given structures. An interpretative framework, studying small communities as traditional, was replaced by attention for history and the wider world. Urban areas, wage labour, missions etc., were therefore a focus for study as well as rural small communities. They developed a methodology called the extended case study or social drama: detailed descriptions of social behaviour were used to uncover deep underlying social structures. Their work concentrated on human beings who were not only formed by society but also moulded society. This stress on human agency led to scepticism about structuralist reasoning.

=== Key publications and major theoretical contributions ===
Social change and the individual. His fieldwork in Serenje, Zambia, during the early 1960s is a prime example of anthropology moving away from a major concern with kinship and static societies to applying ethnographic methods widely in the study of social change. Kinship remains a concern, but it is kinship in action. The interaction between urban and rural sectors is a major theme, and the case of the visit of Pati the townsman encompasses these themes very well. The analysis moves further away from kinship in attention to the Jehovah's Witnesses where the church becomes a source of social stability away from kinship.

An introduction to the Sociology of Rural Development. His major critique on development theory originated from fieldwork in Peru, Latin America. The origin of this critique is clearly seen in a book chapter on regional power structures. Whereas dependency theory posits a strictly hierarchical extraction of surplus for the benefit of world capitalism, Long saw a much more complicated structure of power brokerage. The Introduction to the Sociology of Rural Development gives a comprehensive alternative to common development theories. Long identifies centralist biases in modernisation theory and dependency theory in the first two chapters. The book advocates a view of social change as the product of actors who mould a range of social practices and a wide range of development outcomes are therefore possible.

Development Sociology: Actor perspectives is a collage of insights from a meeting or confrontation of minds: On the one hand an actor-oriented sociology and on the other, the engineering perspectives common in an agricultural university like Wageningen where he latterly worked. It has two major components: interaction at interfaces, and demythologising planned interventions. The term 'interface' is mostly associated with the world of information technology, but refers here to social interfaces: the confrontation of different lifeworlds and particularly in development interventions. It demands attention because of the influence of local social practices when outside interventions occur. The planner, change agent etc. does not dominate society: that is targeted, but is instead one actor among many and not necessarily the dominant one. His work demythologised planned intervention. The latter uses terms like target populations and limited evaluations of interventions, ignoring the wider social and political environment. The idea of planning becomes a reification.

=== Methodological individualism ===
Long's work can be criticised when he overestimates the influence of the individual on social practices (methodological individualism) and assumes an actor has conscious critical insight (reification and idealisations). This can be illustrated from his own work. Among his publications resulting from his first fieldwork in Peru is a study of the Matahuasi enterprise in highland Peru. This is described then as the outcome of rational networking and diversification, He studied the enterprise again a few decades later and concluded: "The days of the Matahuasi-based multiple family enterprise are now numbered. The interconnections between its various branches of activity have broken apart; it is undercapitalised and will undoubtedly be dissolved on Eustaquio's death when his children attempt to claim their inheritance". The latter conclusion is the result of conscientious observation, but it has no place in his interpretative framework.

== Bibliography ==
- Long, N. Development Sociology: Actor Perspectives. London and New York: Routledge, 2001
- Long N. and A.Long (eds) 1992. Battlefields of Knowledge: The Interlocking of Theory and Practice in Social Research and Development. London and New York : Routledge.
- Long, N. and Jan Douwe van der Ploeg 1989. Demythologizing Planned Intervention: An actor perspective in Sociologia Ruralis Volume XIII No.4 1989 pp. 249–272
- Long, N. (ed.). 1989. Encounters at the Interface: A Perspective on Social Discontinuities in Rural Development. Wageningen: Wageningen Agricultural University.
- Long, N. (ed.) 1984. Family and Work in Rural Societies: Perspectives on Non-wage Labour. London: Tavistock Publications.
- Long, N. and B. Roberts (eds). 1984. Miners, Peasants and Entrepreneurs: Regional Development in the Central Highlands of Peru] . Cambridge : Cambridge University Press. (republished 2007)
- Long, N. and Roberts B. (eds.) 1978. Peasant Co-operation and Capitalist Expansion in Central Peru (edited with Bryan Roberts), Austin and London : University of Texas Press 1978.
- Long, N and Rodrigo Sanchez (2014), Peasant and Entrepreneurial Coalitions: The Case of the Matahuasi Cooperative IN Norman Long and Bryan Roberts (eds): Peasant cooperation and Capitalist Expansion in Central Peru Austin: University of Texas Press.
- Long, N. 1977. An Introduction to the Sociology of Rural Development. London : Tavistock Publications.
- Long, N Structural Dependency, Modes of Production and Economic Brokerage in Rural Peru in Ivar Oxaal, Tony Barnett, David Booth (eds,) Beyond the Sociology of Development Economy and Society in Latin America and Africa. Routledge 1975
- Long, N. 1968. Social Change and the Individual: A Study of the Social and Religious Responses to Innovation in a Zambian Rural Community. Manchester : Manchester University Press, 1968.
