= Andrew Wilkinson (paediatrician) =

British paediatrician (born 1943)

Professor Andrew Wilkinson FRCP FRCPCH

Professor of Paediatrics and Perinatal Medicine, University of Oxford
- In office 1997–2011

Personal details
- Born: Andrew Robert Wilkinson; 30 October 1943 (age 82)

Andrew Robert Wilkinson (born 30 October 1943) is a British paediatrician who was Professor Emeritus of Paediatrics and Perinatal Medicine at All Souls College, Oxford. Wilkinson is most notable for being an international authority in neonatology and a lead author of the Standards of Care for NICU and NICE guidelines on retinopathy of prematurity.

== Life ==
Wilkinson took his clinical training at University of Birmingham Medical School, achieving a MB BCh in 1968.

== Career ==
Wilkinson's first position was a house officer in medicine and surgery at City Hospital, Birmingham. In 1969 Wilkinson moved to Warwick Hospital, where he began to specialise in paediatrics. In 1970, Wilkinson was promoted to senior house officer with positions at Birmingham, Warwick, and King Edward VII's Hospital. In 1973, Wilkinson took a position at Great Ormond Street Hospital. In the same year, he was promoted to registrar at Southampton General Hospital. From 1974 to 1975, Wilkinson became a Nuffield Medical Research Fellow at the University of Oxford. Wilkinson then spent two years in the US, as a visiting Fellow at the University of California, San Francisco at the Cardiovascular Research Institute. Returning in 1978 he became a clinical lecturer in paediatrics at the University of Oxford. In 1981, Wilkinson was promoted to consultant paediatrician and worked within the Oxford University Hospitals NHS Foundation Trust until 1992. From 1992 to 1997 Wilkinson was clinical reader at the University of Oxford. In 2011, Wilkinson was elected to be an Emeritus Fellow at All Souls College, Oxford

== Societies ==
From 1983 to 1989, Wilkinson was the Honorary Secretary and Chair of the Academic Board of the Royal College of Paediatrics and Child Health. From 1999 to 2002 Wilkinson was President of the British Association of Perinatal Medicine. From 2003 to 2006 Wilkinson was President of the Neonatal Society.

== Bibliography ==
The following are the most cited papers that Wilkinson contributed to.

- Wood, Nicholas S.; Marlow, Neil; Costeloe, Kate; Gibson, Alan T.; Wilkinson, Andrew R. (10 August 2000). "Neurologic and Developmental Disability after Extremely Preterm Birth". New England Journal of Medicine. 343 (6): 378–384. doi:10.1056/NEJM200008103430601. PMID 10933736.
- Costeloe, Kate; Hennessy, Enid; Gibson, Alan T.; Marlow, Neil; Wilkinson, Andrew R.; Group, for the EPICure Study (1 October 2000). "The EPICure Study: Outcomes to Discharge From Hospital for Infants Born at the Threshold of Viability". Pediatrics. 106 (4): 659–671. doi:10.1542/peds.106.4.659. ISSN 0031-4005. PMID 11015506.
- Painter, Sally L; Wilkinson, Andrew R; Desai, Parul; Goldacre, Michael J; Patel, C K (June 2015). "Incidence and treatment of retinopathy of prematurity in England between 1990 and 2011: database study". British Journal of Ophthalmology. 99 (6): 807–811. doi:10.1136/bjophthalmol-2014-305561. PMID 25427778.
- Jiang, Ze D; Zhou, Yi; Ping, Li L.; Wilkinson, Andrew R (August 2011). "Brainstem auditory response findings in late preterm infants in neonatal intensive care unit". Acta Paediatrica. 100 (8): e51–e54. doi:10.1111/j.1651-2227.2011.02232.x. PMID 21342255.
- Lewandowski, Adam J.; Augustine, Daniel; Lamata, Pablo; Davis, Esther F.; Lazdam, Merzaka; Francis, Jane; McCormick, Kenny; Wilkinson, Andrew R.; Singhal, Atul; Lucas, Alan; Smith, Nic P.; Neubauer, Stefan; Leeson, Paul (5 December 2012). "Preterm Heart in Adult LifeClinical Perspective". Circulation. 127 (2): 197–206. doi:10.1161/circulationaha.112.126920. ISSN 0009-7322. PMID 23224059.
- Lucey, J. F.; Rowan, C. A.; Shiono, P.; Wilkinson, A. R.; Kilpatrick, S.; Payne, N. R.; Horbar, J.; Carpenter, J.; Rogowski, J.; Soll, R. F. (1 June 2004). "Fetal Infants: The Fate of 4172 Infants With Birth Weights of 401 to 500 Grams--The Vermont Oxford Network Experience (1996-2000)". Pediatrics. 113 (6): 1559–1566. doi:10.1542/peds.113.6.1559. ISSN 0031-4005. PMID 15173474.

== Awards and honours ==
- Knight, 1st Class, Order of the White Rose of Finland 2003
- James Spence Medal, 2011
