= Human givens =

Theory in psychotherapy

This is about psychotherapy. See Human condition for the general topic.

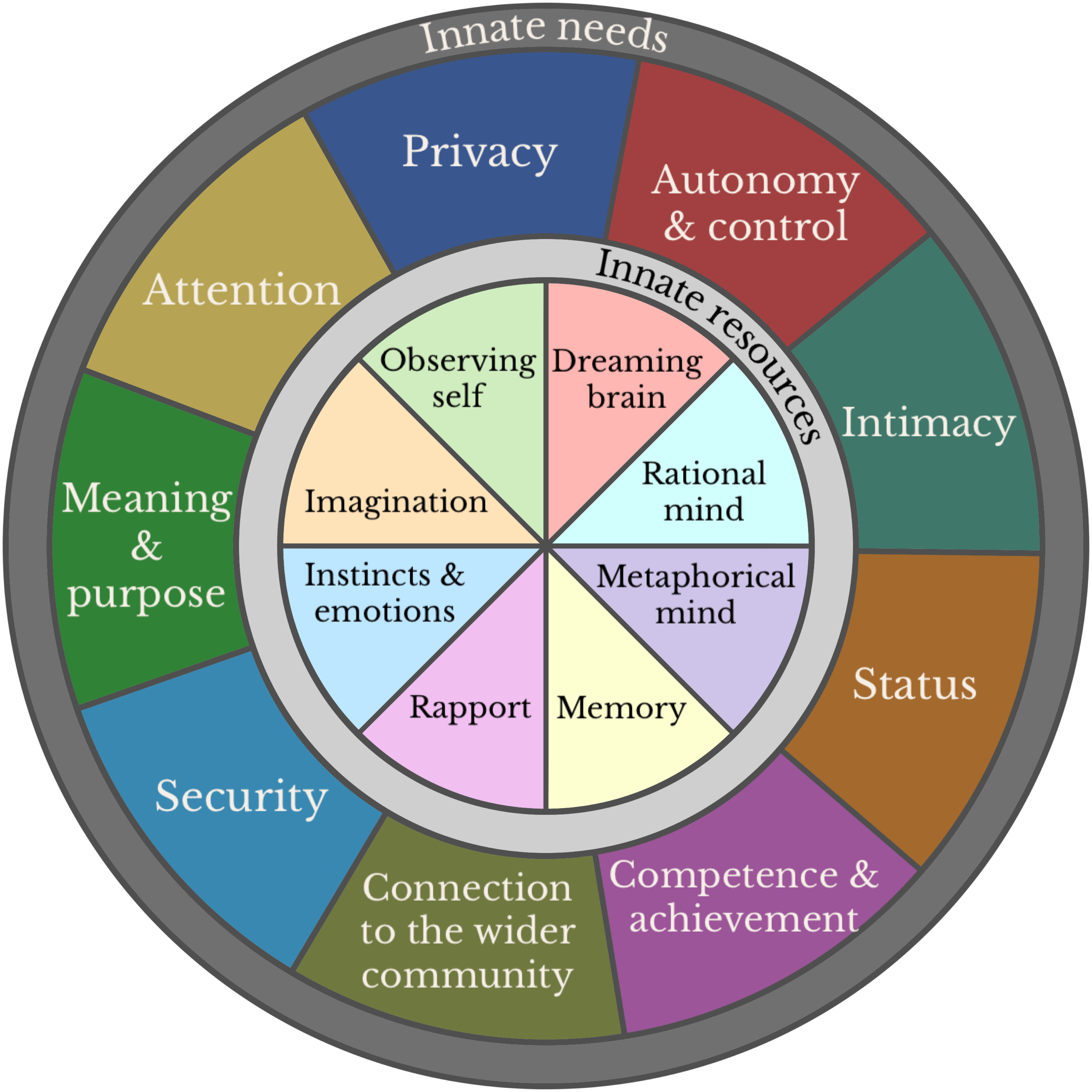
Diagram of the Human Givens therapeutic model.

Human Givens is a theory in psychotherapy proposed by Joe Griffin and Ivan Tyrrell in the late 1990s, and amplified in the 2003 book Human Givens: A new approach to emotional health and clear thinking. Human Givens therapy draws on several psychotherapeutic models, such as motivational interviewing, cognitive behavioural therapy, psychoeducation, interpersonal therapy, imaginal exposure therapy and NLP such as the Rewind Technique.

== Historical background ==
Abraham Maslow is credited with the first prominent theory which laid out a hierarchy of needs. The precise nature of the hierarchy and the needs have subsequently been refined by modern neuroscientific and psychological research.

Since Maslow's work in the middle of the twentieth century, a significant body of research has been undertaken to clarify what human beings need to be happy and healthy. The UK has contributed significantly to the international effort, through the ground breaking Whitehall Study led by Sir Michael Marmot, which tracked the lifestyles and outcomes for large groups of British civil servants. This identified effects on mental and physical health from emotional needs being met—for instance, it showed that those with less autonomy and control over their lives, or less social support, have worse health outcomes.

In the United States, the work of Martin Seligman, a psychologist at the University of Pennsylvania has been influential. Seligman has summarised the research to date in terms of what makes humans happy; again, this demonstrates themes about universal emotional needs which must be met for people to lead fulfilling lives.

Prior to this, in the 1980s at the University of Rochester, contemporaries of Seligman Edward Deci and Richard Ryan have conducted original research and gathered existing evidence to develop a framework of human needs which they call self-determination theory. This states that human beings are born with innate motivations, developed from our evolutionary past. They gather these motivational forces into three groups—autonomy, competence and relatedness. The human givens approach (developed later) uses a framework of nine needs, which partly correlate with these three groups - see the section "Nine into Three" here https://www.hgi.org.uk/articles/the-emotional-needs-scale/.

== Innate needs ==
The human givens model proposes that human beings come into the world with a given set of innate needs, together with innate resources to support them to get those needs met. Physical needs for nutritious food, clean water, air and sleep are obvious, and well understood, because when they are not met people die. However, the emotional needs, which the human givens approach seeks to bring to wider attention, are less obvious, and less well understood, but just as important to human health. Decades of social and health psychology research now support this.

The human givens approach defines nine emotional needs:

1. Security: A sense of safety and security; safe territory; an environment in which people can live without experiencing excessive fear so that they can develop healthily.
2. Autonomy and control: A sense of autonomy and control over what happens around and to us.
3. Status: A sense of status—being accepted and valued in the various social groups we belong to.
4. Privacy: Time and space enough to reflect on and consolidate our experiences.
5. Attention: Receiving attention from others, but also giving it; a form of essential nutrition that fuels the development of each individual, family and culture.
6. Connection to the wider community: Interaction with a larger group of people and a sense of being part of the group.
7. Intimacy: Emotional connection to other people—friendship, love, intimacy, fun.
8. Competence and achievement: A sense of our own competence and achievements, that we have what it takes to meet life's demands.
9. Meaning and purpose: Being stretched, aiming for meaningful goals, having a sense of a higher calling or serving others creates meaning and purpose.

These needs map more or less well to tendencies and motivations described by other psychological evidence, especially that compiled by Deci and Ryan at the University of Rochester. The exact categorisation of these needs, however, is not considered important. Needs can be interlinked and have fuzzy boundaries, as Maslow noted. What matters is a broad understanding of the scope and nature of human emotional needs and why they are so important to our physical and mental health. Humans are a physically vulnerable species that have enjoyed amazing evolutionary success due in large part to their ability to form relationships and communities. Getting the right social and emotional input from others was, in our evolutionary past, literally a matter of life or death. Thus, Human Givens theory states, people are genetically programmed only to be happy and healthy when these needs are met.

There is evidence that these needs are consistent across cultures, and therefore represent innate human requirements.

== Innate resources ==
The Human Givens model also consists of a set of 'resources' (abilities and capabilities) that all human beings are born with, which are used to get the innate needs met. These constitute what is termed an 'inner guidance system'. Learning how to use these resources well is seen as being key to achieving, and sustaining, robust bio-psycho-social health as individuals and as groups (families, communities, societies, cultures etc.).

The given resources include:

- Memory: The ability to develop complex long-term memory, which enables people to add to their innate (instinctive) knowledge and learn;
- Rapport: The ability to build rapport, empathise and connect with others;
- Imagination: Which enables people to focus attention away from the emotions and problem solve more creatively and objectively (a 'reality simulator');
- Instincts and emotions: A set of basic responses and 'propulsion' for behaviours;
- A rational mind: A conscious, rational mind that can check out emotions, question, analyse and plan;
- A metaphorical mind: The ability to 'know', to understand the world unconsciously through metaphorical pattern matching ('this thing is like that thing');
- An observing self: That part of us which can step back, be more objective and recognise itself as a unique centre of awareness apart from intellect, emotion and conditioning;
- A dreaming brain: According to the expectation fulfilment theory of dreaming, this preserves the integrity of our genetic inheritance every night by metaphorically defusing emotionally arousing expectations not acted out during the previous day.

== Three reasons for mental illness ==
A further organising idea proffered by the human givens approach is to suggest that there are three main reasons why individuals may not be getting their needs met and thus why they may become mentally ill:

1. Environment: something in our environment is interfering with our ability to get our needs met. Our environment is 'toxic' (e.g. a bullying boss, antisocial neighbours) or simply lacks what we need (e.g. community);
2. Damage: something is wrong with our 'resources' -- our 'hardware' (brain/body) or 'software' (missing or incomplete instincts and/or unhelpful conditioning such as posttraumatic stress disorder) is damaged;
3. Knowledge: we may not know what we need; or we may not have been taught, or may have failed to learn, the coping skills necessary for getting our needs met (for example, how to use the imagination for problem solving rather than worrying, or how to make and sustain friendships).

When dealing with mental illness or distress this framework provides a checklist that guides both diagnosis and treatment.

Within this framework Joe Griffin and Ivan Tyrrell developed models for several forms of mental illness based on their own research and insights.

- Depression – proposing expectation fulfilment theory of dreaming as the key to understanding the cycle of depression: how depression develops, is maintained and can be successfully treated.
- Addiction
- Autistic spectrum disorder – proposing caetextia as underlying mechanism
- Psychosis – described as waking reality processed through the REM state/dreaming brain

== Human givens therapy ==
Psychotherapy based on the Human Givens theory follows the APET model, following the order in which the brain processes information and offers supportive strategies for each phase.

- Activating agent – a stimulus
- Pattern match – a past event
- Emotions
- Thoughts

Sessions are structured by the RIGAAR model.

- Rapport building
- Information gathering
- Goal setting (new, positive expectations related to the fulfillment of innate needs)
- Accessing resources
- Agreeing on strategies for change (for achieving the needs-related goals)
- Rehearsing success

Human Givens therapy is a solution-focused brief therapy, an approach that is aligned with solution-focused coaching and wellness coaching, and thus the Human Givens approach is used by psychotherapists as well as life coaches and therapeutic coaches.

== Efficacy and criticisms ==
Since its first independent review in 2008, Human Givens Therapy has consistently demonstrated strong outcomes in helping people overcome a wide range of mental health difficulties. Early reviews highlighted its innovative, needs-based approach and the effectiveness of tools such as the rewind technique. Since then, a growing body of research—including large-scale practice evaluations and independent studies such as the recent King's College London review of PTSD Resolution—has shown HG Therapy to deliver reliable, measurable improvements that meet or exceed standard clinical benchmarks. Today, Human Givens practitioners are formally recognised under SCoPEd (the competence framework for counselling and psychotherapy in the UK), placing HG Therapy alongside other leading evidence-based approaches in the field.

In 2008, a systematic review of the literature on the Human Givens approach concluded that the evidence was limited and of low quality. They called for rigorously designed studies. They did find 2 studies of higher quality evidence supporting the rewind technique but attributed the rewind technique rather than the Human Givens approach. The authors called on mainstream journals to provide space for healthy debate.

In 2012 a retrospective review of 3,885 cases found Human Givens Therapy to be clinically equivalent to a benchmark for relief from psychological distress.

A controlled study found that treating people with mild to moderate depressed mood (measured using HADS) with human givens therapy had quicker results than the treatment provided to people in a control group, but suffered problems reaching an adequately sized control group.

A five-year evaluation of the Human Givens therapy using a practice research network found success with relieving psychological distress.

In 2019 a retrospective study found that a Human Givens based therapy provided by PTSD Resolution for the Armed Forces Community was to be an acceptable alternative for IAPT treatment. The therapy offered by PTSD Resolution is based on the rewind technique as adopted by Human Givens.

In 2025 King's College London confirmed the effectiveness of HG Therapy as delivered through the charity PTSD Resolution. The findings highlight:

- 82% of veterans completed their therapy, notably higher than the ~55% completion rate in NHS services.
- 79% of clients with anxiety and depression showed reliable improvement, outperforming the IAPT NHS average of 67–68%. 72% of probable PTSD cases experienced reliable improvement.
- Treatment outcomes were comparable to standard clinical benchmarks, with improvements sustained over time.
- The average course length was just ~8 sessions, with quick access—average wait was 12 days from referral.

== See also ==
- Maslow's hierarchy of needs
- Manfred Max-Neef's Fundamental human needs
- Ivan Tyrrell
