= British Association of Perinatal Medicine =

- Abbreviation: BAPM
- Established: 1976
- Location: London
- Coordinates: 51.520752°N 0.115°W
- Members: 1000 (2019)
- President: Dr Gopi Menon
- Website: www.bapm.org

British Association of Perinatal Medicine, known as BAPM, is a charitable organization that was founded in Bristol in 1976 that is most notable for being a pressure group to advance the standards of perinatal care within the United Kingdom by a dedicated core of professional physicians who are accredited by examination.

== Early history ==
In 1972, Donald Court, who would later become president of the British Paediatric Association and Tony Jackson produced a booklet, that was called Paediatrics in the Seventies that for the first time advanced the idea that perinatal paediatrics would be sub-speciality of Medicine, and progress was slow to recognise it as such.

BAPM as an idea started in 1974, when the paediatrician Peter M. Dunn wrote a leader for The Lancet called The price of perinatal neglect. In the 1970s the care of newborn infants was considered dire, and only after their registration by their parents, when they were six weeks old, did they become NHS patients. Combined with many others problems like paediatricians who were single handed, underfunded and distributed across large areas of the population, with the result that perinatal mortality in the UK was five times higher than it need have been and that as many newborn infants died in the first three days of life as in the whole of the remainder of childhood. When The Lancet article was published, it aroused the interest of the government, and the Department of Health contacted the British Paediatric Association to investigate the matter. In 1975 June Lloyd acting for the government, wrote to Dunn to ask him for help in finding all the paediatricians who were specifically working, i.e. caring for newborn babies in the UK After Dunn wrote to all the medical universities and maternity hospitals in the United Kingdom, to all paediatricians who were spending more than 60% of their time with newborn children and collected 20 people in total, he decided to try and advance an idea to provide help, where ever he could.

Dunn first approached the British Paediatric Association and consulted the president Donald Court who encouraged Dunn to organise the small group. Dunn also spoke with Roy Meadow who advised Dunn on problems he would face to establishing the association, including accusations of empire building from certain paediatricians who would be excluded from his group, including senior paediatricians who provided leadership in neonatal medicine and were prominent members of the Neonatal Society. When Dunn approached the Neonatal Society, they declined to help.

Dunn sent a letter to the 20 people he had identified and invited them to a meeting at the BPA in York, that was to be held to initiate BAPM as a pressure group. At the time Roy Meadow posted a notice seeking members who were interested in the care of the newborn with the hospital and university in York. Unfortunately, there was no significant progress during the abortive meeting, as Dunn was looking for those of were actually facing the problems of providing a neonatal intensive care service. As there were none there, the meeting closed. Dunn then decided to write to all the 20 people requesting a second time that they attend a Neonatal Symposium in Bristol in 1976. This meeting occurred, and the British Paediatric Perinatal Group, the forerunner to BAPM was formed as a pressure group.

Dunn's initial idea for the association was that it would work as a twin group, alongside obstetrics, i.e. the twin being a new British Obstetric Perinatal Group. However, this never happened. Dunn approached several colleagues who were specialists in obstetrics, who were initially enthused by the idea, but was subsequently dissuaded by the Royal College of Obstetricians and Gynaecologists. The common view of obstetrics at the time was that all gynaecologists were already perinatologists. On top of this, the Royal College of Obstetrics and Gynaecology did not agree to the BPA being affiliated to their college.

== Recognition ==
Dunn commenced the process of gaining formal recognition of the subject of perinatal paediatrics, and enable formal examinations to be held for physicians seeking to gain a speciality in perinatal paediatrics, i.e. a training programme from the Royal Colleges and the British Paediatric Association (BPA). In 1977, Dunn approached the BPA to begin this process of formal recognition of the perinatal paediatrics group. In conversation with the BPA, they replied that neonatology was likely to remain in the domain of general paediatrician's and therefore perinatal or neonatal paediatrics would not be recognised as a sub-speciality.

For much of the 1980s, neither the BPA nor the Royal College of Obstetricians and Gynaecologists felt that a country-wide, coordinated service for specialist neonatology and high risk obstetrics were of much use. Indeed, for much of the decade, the differentiation in obstetric and neonatal care units for those offering complex care and those offering care at the local level, had made little progress within the UK.

By the end of the 1980s, with many therapeutic treatments being introduced, there was a slow dawning of recognition that there was a place for specialist neonatology and neonatal centres, although the majority of neonatal care was still being delivered by general paediatricians who worked outside specialist centres, treating both paediatric and neonatal patients, and it was unlikely the situation would have changed without many new doctors coming into the profession, as the decade passed.

== First quarter century ==
In 1981, Dunn created an executive committee and a chairman position was announced, to better address working practices, often meeting in his house in Bristol. In 1982, Peter Tizard gave the first annual Founders' Lecture, who in his lecture pointed out that it should be an appointed president, not a chairman. At that time, Dunn also registered the group as a charity, and changed the name from perinatal group to British Association of Perinatal Paediatrics. Dunn became the first president and Harold Gamsu the honorary secretary.

In 1982, the chairman of the Royal College of Obstetricians and Gynaecologists working party, Charlie Whitfield suggested that the group should be called the British Association of Perinatal Medicine. This was finally accomplished by Dunn in 1987. A training programme was created in 1982 for those looking for a career in perinatal paediatrics by the British Paediatric Association and Royal College of Physicians. This process took six years and was helped by Donald Court who published the report called Fit for the Future in 1976, that recognised the high mortality rate of perinatal mortality, and by the Short Report published in 1979-1980, that highlighted the neglect of perinatal medicine in the country.

One of the most important advanced for BAPM was the publication of the report, called the Körner report in 1984. led by the National Health Service (NHS) Reformer Edith Körner. The most important recommendations from BAPM's perspective from the report, was that in future all infants should be recognised at birth as a patient, as well as defining a data set for the baby as well as the mother, in part to move the NHS into the digital age.

== Dunn Perinatal Library ==
On 18 January 2012, the association opened a library with books that were provided from Peter Dunn's own personal collection. The libraries aims are to support the learning and information needs of the BAPM's members, students, and staff.

== Presidents ==
The following are the past presidents.

- 1981 Peter Dunn
- 1984 Cliff Roberton
- 1987 Forrester Cockburn
- 1990 Richard Cooke
- 1993 Garth McClure
- 1996 Phil Steer First obstetrics president
- 1999 Andrew Wilkinson
- 2002 Malcolm Chiswick
- 2005 Neil Marlow
- 2008 David Field
- 2011 Bryan Gill
- 2014 Alan Fenton
- 2017 Gopi Menon
