= Neonatal Society =

Learned society for the promotion of neonatal science

- Formation: 24 April 1959; 66 years ago at the Royal Hotel, Scarborough
- Website: https://www.neonatalsociety.ac.uk/

Established in the United Kingdom in 1959 the Neonatal Society is the world's oldest learned society for the promotion of neonatal science. It is composed of both scientists and clinicians working in the area of the fetus and newborn.

The archives of the organisation are deposited at the Wellcome Library.

== President and Past Officers ==
Chris Gale, professor at Imperial College London, is the current president of the organisation, with Andrew Ewer as the immediate past president.

Previous presidents include:

- James Boardman
- Howard Clark
- David Hull
- Robert McCance
- Neena Modi, the former president of the British Medical Association and the Royal College of Paediatrics and Child Health
- Peter Tizard
- Elsie Widdowson
- Andrew Wilkinson
- Maureen Young

Thomas Stapleton was a founder member of the organisation.

== Membership ==
There are two main memberships available for the Neonatal Society: Ordinary Membership and Trainee Membership. Honorary Membership may be offered to persons who have made notable contributions to the study of the newborn.
