= 2021 New Year Honours =

British royal recognitions

The 2021 New Year Honours are appointments by some of the 16 Commonwealth realms to various orders and honours to recognise and reward good works by citizens of those countries. The New Year Honours are awarded as part of the New Year celebrations at the start of January and those for 2021 were announced on 30 December 2020.

The recipients of honours are displayed as they were styled before their new honour and arranged by the country whose ministers advised Queen Elizabeth II on the appointments, then by the honour and by the honour's grade (i.e. Knight/Dame Grand Cross, Knight/Dame Commander etc.), and then by divisions (i.e. Civil, Diplomatic, and Military), as appropriate.

== United Kingdom ==
Below are the individuals appointed by Elizabeth II in her right as Queen of the United Kingdom with honours within her own gift and with the advice of the Government for other honours.

=== The Order of the Companions of Honour ===
==== Member of the Order of the Companions of Honour (CH) ====
- Sir David Chipperfield, CBE, Architect, David Chipperfield Architects. For services to Architecture.

=== Knight Bachelor ===
- Richard James Atkins, CBE, lately Further Education Commissioner, Department for Education. For services to Further Education.
- Christopher Mark Le Brun, lately President, Royal Academy. For services to the Arts.
- Robert William Chote, lately Chairman, Office for Budget Responsibility. For services to Fiscal Policy and to the Economy.
- The Right Honourable Thomas Clarke, CBE, JP. For public and political service.
- Simon Baron-Cohen, FBA, Professor of Autism Research, University of Cambridge. For services to People with Autism.
- The Right Honourable Charles Geoffrey Cox, QC, MP, Member of Parliament for Torridge and West Devon. For parliamentary and political service.
- Stephen John Deuchar, CBE, lately Director, Art Fund. For services to the Arts.
- Dieter Robin Helm, CBE, Chair, Natural Capital Committee. For services to the Environment, to Energy and to Utilities Policy.
- David John Lewis, lately Chief Executive Officer, Tesco. For services to the Food Industry and to Business.
- Francis Gerard McCormac, FRSE, FSA, FRSA, Principal and Vice-Chancellor, University of Stirling. For services to Education and to the Economy.
- David Charles Pearson, CBE, lately Director of Adult Social Care, Nottinghamshire Council. For services to Health and Social Care Integration.
- David Ian Stuart, FRS, Professor of Structural Biology, University of Oxford. For services to Medical Research and to the Scientific Community.
- David Thompson, QPM, DL, Chief Constable, West Midlands Police. For services to Policing.
- Graham Vick, CBE, Founder and Artistic Director, Birmingham Opera Company. For services to Music and to the Regions.
- Peter Thomas Wanless, CB, Chief Executive Officer, NSPCC. For services to Children, to Young People and to the Charitable Sector.
- Guy Howard Weston. For services to Philanthropy and to Charity.

Overseas and International

- Roger Alexander Deakins, CBE, Cinematographer. For services to Film.
- Lewis Carl Davidson Hamilton, MBE, Formula One Racing Driver. For services to Motorsports.

=== The Most Honourable Order of the Bath ===
==== Knight / Dame Commander of the Order of the Bath (KCB / DCB) ====
Military

- Vice Admiral Benjamin John Key, CBE, C031724D.

Civil

- Lynne Gillian Owens, CBE, QPM, Director General, National Crime Agency. For services to Law Enforcement.
- Paul Anthony Cosford, CB, lately Emeritus Medical Director, Public Health England. For services to Public Health.

==== Companion of the Order of the Bath (CB) ====
Military

- Lieutenant General Giles Hill, CBE
- Major General Paul Andrew Cain, QHP
- Major General Richard James Aethelstan Stanford, MBE
- Major General Gwyn Jenkins, Assistant Chief of the Naval Staff
- Rear Admiral Andy Kyte, Assistant Chief of Defence Staff (Support Operations)
- Air Vice-Marshal Ian Duguid, OBE
- Air Vice-Marshal Stephen Jeffrey Shell, OBE

Civil

- Derek Alexander Baker, Permanent Secretary, Department of Education, Northern Ireland Executive. For public service.
- Mark Bowman, Director General, International, H.M. Treasury. For public service.
- Fiona Caroline Gail Chamberlain, Lately Crown Solicitor for Northern Ireland. For public service.
- Katherine (Kata) Edda Escott, Strategy Director, Ministry of Defence. For public service.
- Josephine Maria Farrar, OBE, Chief Executive Officer, H.M. Prison and Probation Service. For public service.
- Daniel Isaac Greenberg, Counsel for Domestic Legislation, House of Commons. For services to Parliament.
- Malini Nebhrajani, Legal Director, Department for Health and Social Care Legal Advisers, Government Legal Department. For public service.
- Gwyneth Nurse, Director of Financial Services, HM Treasury. For public service.
- Kenneth MacRae Robertson, Digital Director, Department for Work and Pensions. For services to Government Technology.

=== The Most Distinguished Order of Saint Michael and Saint George ===
==== Dame Commander of the Order of St Michael and St George (DCMG) ====
- Caroline Wilson, CMG, HM Ambassador, Beijing, China and former Director Europe, Foreign and Commonwealth Office. For services to British foreign policy.

==== Companion of the Order of St Michael and St George (CMG) ====
- Jonathan Guy Allen, Acting Permanent Representative, UK Mission to the United Nations, New York, United States of America. For services to British foreign policy.
- Brian John Davidson, HM Ambassador, Bangkok, Thailand. For services to British foreign policy.
- Rachel Glennerster, Chief Economist, Foreign, Commonwealth and Development Office. For services to International Development.
- Andrew Richard Heyn, OBE, Consul General, Hong Kong. For services to British foreign policy.
- Christina Martha Elena Scott, Deputy Head of Mission, British Embassy, Beijing, China. For services to British foreign policy.
- Simon Shercliff, OBE, Director, National Security, Foreign, Commonwealth and Development Office. For services to British foreign policy and National Security.
- Jan Thompson, OBE, Acting High Commissioner, British High Commission, New Delhi, India. For services to British foreign policy.
- Mark Willis, Director, Foreign, Commonwealth and Development Office. For services to British foreign policy.

=== Royal Victorian Order|The Royal Victorian Order ===
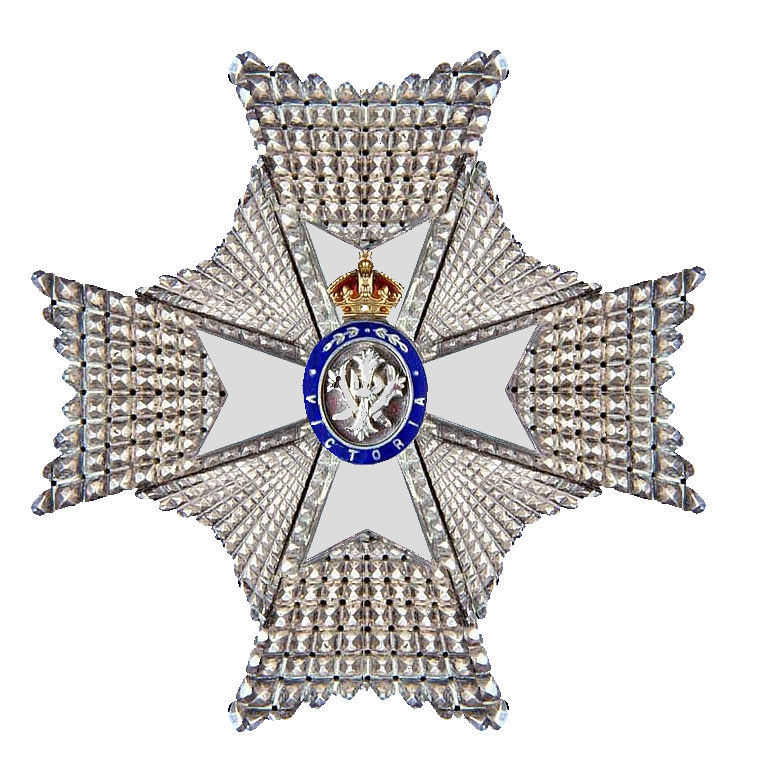
Insignia of a Knight / Dame Commander of the Royal Victorian Order

==== Knight Commander of the Royal Victorian Order (KCVO) ====
- Peter John Field, JP. Lord-Lieutenant of East Sussex.
- Huw Jeremy Wyndham Thomas, Head of the Medical Household and Physician to the Queen.

==== Commander of the Royal Victorian Order (CVO) ====
- Thomas David Briggs, MBE, Lord-Lieutenant of Cheshire.
- David Christopher Lindsay, Lord-Lieutenant of County Down.
- Stephen James Patterson, LVO, Head of Collections Information Management, Royal Collection, Royal Household.
- Alan Michael Rind, Lately Trustee, Foundation of the College of St George.
- His Grace Richard Scott, 10th Duke of Buccleuch, KT, KBE, Lately Trustee, Royal Collection Trust.
- Peter John Charles Troughton, CBE, Lately Chairman, Future Programme Board and Trustee, Royal Collection Trust.

==== Lieutenant of the Royal Victorian Order (LVO) ====
- Irene Louise Campden, MVO, Lately Senior Book Conservator - Restorer, Royal Collection, Royal Household.
- Deborah Clare Clark, MVO, Lately Senior Curator, Palace of Holyroodhouse, Royal Collection.
- John David Coombe, Member, Royal Household's Sovereign Grant Audit and Risk Assurance Committee.
- Colonel Michael John Fitzhardinge Kingscote, Lately Lieutenant, The Queen's Body Guard of the Yoemen of the Guard.
- Shutica Patel, MVO, Lately Head of Photographic Services, Royal Collection, Royal Household.
- Christopher Roy Stevens, MVO, Lately Superintendent of the Royal Collection, Hampton Court Palace.

==== Member of the Royal Victorian Order (MVO) ====
- Tifare Joseph Alexander, Travel and Logistics Officer, Royal Household of The Duke and Duchess of Cambridge.
- Allan Chin, Lately Senior Collections Information Assistant (Prints and Drawings), Royal Collection, Royal Household.
- Mark Jeremy Hugh Evans. For Services to the Household of the Earl and Countess of Wessex.
- Ian John Zahra-Hall, Electrician, Property Section, Royal Household.
- Christopher Martin Mann. For Services to Cumberland Lodge.
- Leonard Maurice Mullins. For Services to the Lieutenancy of Pembrokeshire.
- Linda Susan Savides, Senior HR Manager, Household of the Prince of Wales and Duchess of Cornwall.
- Kevin David Steward. For Services to Catering, Sandringham Visitor Centre.
- Lynne Diana Thompson, Personal Secretary to the Prince of Wales.
- Andrew Charles Edward Todd, Lately Security Advisor and Business Continuity Manager, Royal Household.
- Lucy Catherine Whitehouse, Personal Assistant to the Deputy Master of the Household and Equerry to the Queen.
- Melanie Anne Wilson, Lately Catalogue Raisonne Assistant, Royal Collection, Royal Household.
- Scott Leonard Furssedonn-Wood, Deputy Private Secretary to the Prince of Wales and Duchess of Cornwall.
- Tiemei Xing, Senior Management Accountant, Privy Purse and Treasurer's Office, Royal Household.

=== Royal Victorian Medal (RVM) ===
Gold

- Anthony John Hardingham, RVM, Tractor Driver, Sandringham Estate.
- Robert Stephen Jones, RVM, lately Palace Attendant, Master of the Household's Department, Royal Household.

Silver

- Brian James Coutts, lately Visitor Operations Assistant, Palace of Holyroodhouse, Royal Collection.
- Paul William Cunliffe, MBE, Yeoman Warder, H.M. Tower of London.
- Yvonne Maria Holt, Senior Service Team Member, Government House, Perth, Australia.
- David John Sinnett Jones, Senior Gardener, Buckingham Palace.
- Paul Terrance King, Livery Porter, Master of the Household's Department, Royal Household.
- Agnieszka Monika Kosterska, Assistant Housekeeper, Wren House.
- Martin Lempriere, Postman, Buckingham Palace.
- Terence Ian Lewendon, Carpenter, Crown Estate, Windsor.
- Neil Edward Arthur Marcham, Deputy Personal Assistant and Projects Co-ordinator, Privy Purse and Treasurer's Office, Royal Household.
- Andrew Charles McCarthy, Head Gardener, Bagshot Park.
- Neil Scott Mealor, Wardens Team Leader, Crown Estate, Windsor.
- Sheilah Christine Muston, lately Estate Manager to The Duchess of Cornwall.
- Martin Gary Pether. For services to Royalty and Specialist Protection.
- Beatriz Ramirez, lately Assistant Retail Manager, Royal Collection, Royal Household.
- Philip Reddy, Tractor Unit Team Leader, Crown Estate, Windsor.
- Keith Robinson, lately Divisional Sergeant Major, The Queen's Body Guard of the Yeomen of the Guard.
- Audrey Maria Rozario, Metropolitan Police Service. For services to Royalty and Specialist Protection's Special Escort Group.
- Stevan John Turnbull, Arborist Team Supervisor, Crown Estate, Windsor.

Honorary - Silver

- Olalla Amboage Tato Ramchurreetoo, Dining Room Supervisor, Master of the Household's Department, Royal Household.

=== The Most Excellent Order of the British Empire ===
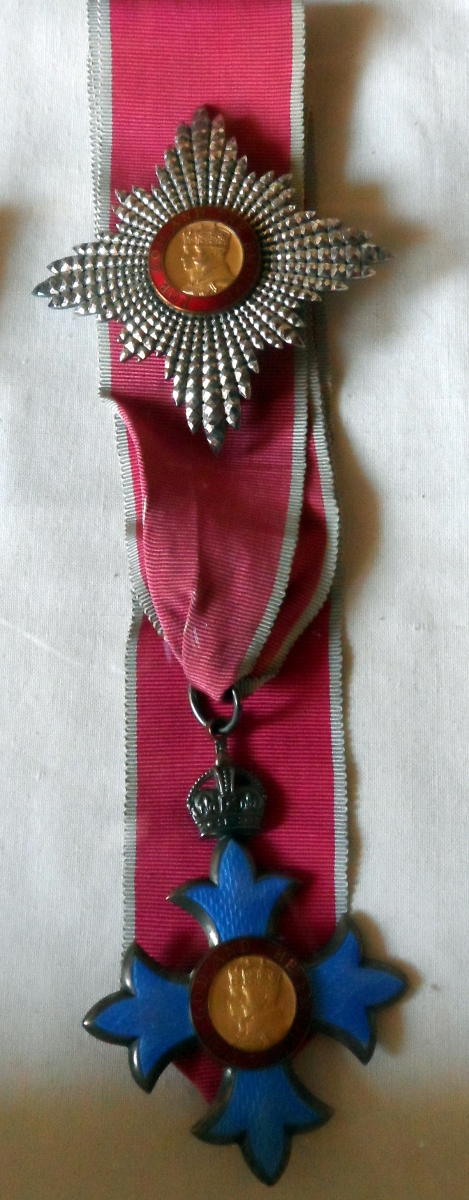
Insignia of a Knight Commander of the Order of the British Empire

==== Knight / Dame Commander of the Order of the British Empire (KBE / DBE) ====
Military

- Lieutenant General James Hockenhull, OBE
- Lieutenant General Tyrone Richard Urch, CBE

Civil

- Karin Barber, CBE, FBA, Centennial Professor of Anthropology, London School of Economics. For services to the Study of African Culture.
- Angela Eagle, MP, Member of Parliament for Wallasey. For parliamentary and political service.
- Jane Alison Glover, CBE, Conductor and Writer. For services to Music.
- Rachel Griffith, CBE, FBA, Economist. For services to Economic Policy and to Education.
- Sheila Hancock, CBE, Actress. For services to Drama and to Charity.
- Irene Lucas-Hays, CBE, For services to Training, to Education and to Young People.
- Caroline Mason, CBE, Chief Executive, Esmee Fairbairn Foundation. For services to the Charity Sector, particularly during the Covid-19 response.
- Patricia Ann McGrath, MBE, Make-up Artist. For services to the Fashion and Beauty Industry and to Diversity.
- Carol Propper, CBE, FBA, Economist. For services to Economic Policy and Public Health.
- Joanna Gabrielle da Silva, OBE, Director, Arup Group Ltd. For services to Engineering and to International, Sustainable Development.
- Alwen Williams, CBE, Chief Executive, Barts Health NHS Trust. For services to Leadership in the NHS.

==== Commander of the Order of the British Empire (CBE) ====
Military

- Acting Brigadier (now Brigadier) Elizabeth Jane Faithfull-Davies
- Colonel Colin John Francis, MBE
- Colonel Alison Louise McCourt, OBE, ARRC
- Brigadier Phillip David Prosser
- Group Captain Kevin Roy Bailey
- Air Commodore Thomas James Patrick Burke
- Air Commodore Paul Edward O'Neill
- Air Commodore P. J. Robinson, OBE, DFC**
- Group Captain K. R. Bailey
- P. Rimmer (Public Servant)
- Commodore Douglas Doull, ADC, Naval Base Commander Clyde
- Commodore Martyn Williams, OBE, Head of Naval Ship Support, Defence Equipment and Support
- Commodore Craig Wood, Commodore Surface Flotilla

Civil

- Fayyaz Afzal, OBE, Circuit Judge, England and Wales. For services to the Judiciary and to Diversity and Inclusion.
- Marcus Ambrose Paul Agius, lately Chairman, Royal Botanic Gardens, Kew. For services to Botany and to Conservation.
- Timothy Richard Allen, Prison Group Director, Manchester, Mersey and Cheshire, H.M. Prison and Probation Service. For public service.
- Thomas Eardley Allison. For services to Scottish Business and to Charity.
- Julian Anderson, Composer. For services to Music.
- Stephen Bagshaw, Chairman, Fujifilm Diosynth Biotechnologies. For services to the UK Manufacturing and Biotechnology Sector.
- Neville Alfred Baxter, President, Nottingham Conservatives. For political service.
- Graeme Betts, Director of Adult Social Care, Birmingham City Council. For services to Adult Social Care.
- Wendy Anne Bickmore, FRS, FRSE, Director, MRC Human Genetics Unit, University of Edinburgh. For services to Biomedical Sciences and to Women in Science.
- Lucy Victoria Bird, Director, Transport Security, Resilience and Response, Department for Transport. For public service.
- Timothy Charles Eltringham Brown, Chair, IDEO. For services to Design.
- Anthony Edward Tudor Browne, Children's Author and Illustrator. For services to Literature.
- Wendy Katherine Burn, President, Royal College of Psychiatrists. For services to Mental Health.
- Anthony Keith Campbell, Honorary Research Professor, School of Pharmacy, Cardiff University. For services to Biochemistry.
- Margaret Adela Miriam Carver. For services to Sport and to the Media Sector.
- Robert Champion, MBE, Founder, Bob Champion Cancer Trust. For charitable services to Prostate and Testicular Cancer Research.
- Felicity Ann Waley-Cohen, Trustee, Robert And Felicity Waley-Cohen Charitable Trust. For services to Children's Medicine.
- Richard Graham Corbett, lately Leader, European Parliamentary Labour Party. For European parliamentary and political service.
- Ilse Catherine Crawford, MBE, Interior and Furniture Designer. For services to Design.
- Peter Dawson, OBE, Chief Executive and Secretary, Royal and Ancient Golf Club. For services to Golf.
- Barbara Helen Dean, Chief Executive Officer, Nest Corporation. For services to Pension Saving.
- William Barry Douglas, OBE, Concert Pianist. For services to Music and to Community Relations in Northern Ireland.
- Allister Ian Ferguson, FRSE, Professor of Photonics, University of Strathclyde. For services to Science and to Industry.
- Ian Gardner Finlay, Consultant Surgeon, Glasgow Royal Infirmary and Professional Consultant, Health Workforce Directorate, Scottish Government. For services to Medical Education and Training.
- Sonia Flynn, Chief Probation Officer, National Probation Service. For public service.
- Bashabi Fraser. For services to Education, to Culture and to Integration in Scotland.
- Caroline Jane Gardner, FRSE, lately Auditor General for Scotland. For services to the Scottish Public Sector.
- Mina Golshan, Deputy Chief Inspector, Office for Nuclear Regulation. For services to Nuclear Regulation.
- Usha Claire Goswami, FBA, Professor of Cognitive Developmental Neuroscience, University of Cambridge. For services to Educational Research.
- Christopher Montague Grigg, Chief Executive Officer, British Land. For services to Business, particularly during the Covid-19 response.
- Jane Elizabeth Guyett, Senior Independent Director, UK Government Investments. For public service to the Economy.
- Paul Denniston Hackett, Chief Executive, Optivo. For services to Social Housing.
- Francesca Gabrielle Happé, FBA, Professor of Cognitive Neuroscience, King's College London. For services to the Study of Autism.
- Daniel John Harding, Conductor. For services to Music.
- Sean William Holland, Chief Social Work Officer, Department of Health, Northern Ireland Executive. For public service.
- Mark Hopwood, Managing Director, Great Western Railway. For services to Transport.
- Emma Louise Jones, MBE, Founder, Enterprise Nation. For services to Small Businesses and to Entrepreneurs.
- Marianne Saleisha Juanette, (Marianne Cwynarski), Head, Governance and Central Services and Secretary, House of Commons Commission. For services to Parliament.
- Wasfi Kani, OBE, Co-founder and Chief Executive Officer, Grange Park Opera. For services to the Arts.
- Michael Ashton Kuhn, lately Board Member, Northern Ireland Screen. For services to the Film Industry.
- Michael Landy, Artist. For services to Art.
- Stephen Lansberry, Academic, Cambridge. For services to Music Education and Research.
- John Laramy, Principal, Exeter College. For services to Education.
- Mark Alexander Larmour, Political Director, Northern Ireland Office. For services to the Peace Process in Northern Ireland.
- Lesley Ann Manville, OBE, Actress. For services to Drama and to Charity.
- Bernard Francis McConville, (Brian McConville), Owner and Chair, MJM Group. For services to the Economy and to Charity in Northern Ireland.
- Maureen Margaret Ann McGinn, JP, (Lady Elvidge), Lately Chair, National Lottery Community Fund Scotland Committee. For services to Heritage and to a Civil Society.
- Nigel Newton, Founder, Bloomsbury Publishing. For services to the Publishing Industry.
- David Christopher Ormerod, Deputy High Court Judge and lately Law Commissioner for Criminal Law, The Law Commission. For services to Criminal Justice.
- Michelle Claire Ovens, MBE, Founder, Small Business Britain and Chair, Small Business Charter Management Board. For services to Small Businesses and Entrepreneurs.
- Edward Peck, Vice-Chancellor, Nottingham Trent University. For services to Higher Education.
- Preetha Ramachandran, Group Director, South East Universal Credit Operations, Department for Work and Pensions. For services to the Unemployed.
- Paul Derek James Rimmer, lately Deputy Chief of Defence Intelligence, Ministry of Defence. For services to Defence.
- Patricia Ann Ritchie, Chief Executive, Newcastle City Council. For services to Local Government and to Public Service Reform.
- Richard Alan Ross, Chair, Rosetrees Trust. For services to Philanthropy during Covid-19.
- Sheila Rowan, MBE, FRS, FRSE, Director, Institute for Gravitational Research and Chief Scientific Adviser for Scotland. For services to Science.
- Raad Shakir, Professor of Neurology (Visiting), Imperial College London. For services to Global Neurology.
- Russell James Shaw, Founder, Tech London Advocates. For services to Technology and to Business in London.
- Sembukuttiarachilage Ravi Pradip Silva, Director Advanced Technology Institute, University of Surrey. For services to Science, to Education and to Research.
- Anthony Smith, Deputy Director, Ministry of Defence. For services to Defence.
- Melanie Jane Smith, Chief Executive Officer, Ocado Retail Ltd. For services to Retail and the Food Supply Chain during the Covid-19 Response.
- Mark Summerfield, lately HR Director, Crown Prosecution Service. For public service.
- His Honour Philip Sycamore, lately Circuit Judge and Tribunal Chamber President and Senior Commissioner, Judicial Appointments Commission. For public service.
- Paul Alexander Terrington, Head of Consulting, PwC UK and EMEA and lately Regional Chair, PwC Northern Ireland. For services to the Economy in Northern Ireland.
- Andrew Stuart Thompson, lately Executive Chair, Arts and Humanities Research Council. For services to Research.
- Keith John Thompson, lately Chief Executive Officer, Cell and Gene Therapy Catapult. For services to Science and to Innovation.
- Inga Marian Warren, Author and Co-director, Family Infant Neurodevelopment Education Programme. For services to the Care of Premature Babies.
- Keith Charles Frederick Weed, President, Advertising Association. For services to the Advertising and Marketing Industry.
- Petra Wend, FRSE, lately Principal and Vice-Chancellor, Queen Margaret University, Edinburgh. For services to Higher Education.
- Shearer Carroll West, Vice-Chancellor, University of Nottingham. For services to Higher Education.
- Greta Westwood, Chief Executive, Florence Nightingale Foundation. For services to Nursing and Midwifery.
- Joanne Louise Whitfield, Chief Executive Officer, Retail, Co-Op Group. For services to Retail and to the Food Supply Chain during the Covid-19 Response.
- Pauline Margaret Williams, Senior Vice President and Head of Global Health, GlaxoSmithKline. For services to Medical Research and Development.
- Wendy Ann Williams, Independent Lead, Windrush Lessons Learned Review and H.M. Inspector of Constabulary and Fire and Rescue Services. For public service.
- Richard Leslie Martin Wohanka, Chair and Trustee, Nuclear Trust and Director, Nuclear Liabilities Fund. For services to the Nuclear Industry.
- Christopher John Woolard, lately Interim Chief Executive, Financial Conduct Authority. For services to Financial Regulation and Financial Technology Innovation.
- David Wootton, Managing Director, Wootton Education. For services to Education.
- Simon York, Director, Fraud Investigation Service, H.M. Revenue and Customs. For services to Countering International Tax Fraud.

==== Officer of the Order of the British Empire (OBE) ====
Military

- Lieutenant Colonel Graham Clark Dempsey
- Colonel Julian Guy Hill
- Lieutenant Colonel Richard Adrian James Hoy
- Lieutenant Colonel Richard John Hudson
- Lieutenant Colonel Emma Jane Hutley
- Colonel (now Brigadier) Matthew Howard Jones, MBE
- Colonel Neil Douglas Jurd
- Lieutenant Colonel Gareth John Walker
- Lieutenant Colonel Iain Stewart Wallace
- Lieutenant Colonel Henry Alexander Willi
- Group Captain A-M. Houghton
- Group Captain C. D. Snaith
- Commander Marcus Jacques, RN - Liaison Officer to the United States Coastguard
- Commander Darren Mason, CO HMS Vengeance (Port)
- Colonel Jaimie Norman, DSO, RM
- Commodore Rob Wood, Commodore Naval Legal Service

Civil

- Matthew Abel. Team Leader, Ministry of Defence. For services to Defence. (London, Greater London)
- Anwar Ali. Founder and Director, Upturn Enterprise Ltd. For services to Social Enterprise. (Ashton-under-Lyne, Greater Manchester)
- Councillor Azhar Ali. Leader of Labour Group, Lancashire County Council. For services to the community in North West England. (Brierfield, Lancashire)
- Dhiya Al-Jumeily. Professor of Artificial Intelligence, Liverpool John Moores University. For services to Scientific Research. (Liverpool, Merseyside)
- Linda Ross Anderson. Professor of Modern English and American Literature, Newcastle University. For services to Higher Education. (Newcastle upon Tyne, Tyne and Wear)
- John Angeli. Director of Parliamentary Audio-Video, House of Lords. For services to Parliament. (Haywards Heath, West Sussex)
- Philip Norman Archer. Lately Principal, Leith School of Art. For services to Art and to Education. (Edinburgh)
- Vivienne Artz. Chief Privacy Officer, Refinitiv and President, Women in Banking and Finance. For services to Financial Services and to Gender Diversity. (Headcorn, Kent)
- Heather Jane Bacon. Animal Welfare and Veterinary Outreach Manager, Jeanne Marchig International Centre for Animal Welfare Education, Edinburgh. For services to Veterinary Education, to Animal Welfare and to Charity in the UK and Abroad. (Edinburgh)
- Stephen Baker. Chair, National Pubwatch. For services to Reducing Crime and Improving Safety in Licensed Premises. (Aylesbury, Buckinghamshire)
- Colin Lester Balsam. For services to the UK Music Industry and to Charity. (London, Greater London)
- Jonathan Bamford. For services to Data Protection. (Alderley Edge, Cheshire)
- John Jeremy Bangs. Senior Commissioning Manager for Carers, Surrey County Council. For services to Carers. (London, Greater London)
- Andrew Charles Robert Barnett. Director, Calouste Gulbenkian Foundation (UK). For services to Social Change. (London, Greater London)
- Sandra Marilyn Barnett-Pollock. Director, Open Mind Training and Development. For services to Equality. (Leicester, Leicestershire)
- Cordella Bart-Stewart. Founder, Black Solicitors' Network and Judge, Immigration and Asylum Chamber. For services to the Legal Profession and voluntary service to Diversity and to Education. (London, Greater London)
- Brian Robert Barwick. Lately Chairman, Rugby Football League. For services to Sport and to Sports Broadcasting. (London, Greater London)
- Robert Edward John Baxter. Director of Rugby, Exeter Chiefs. For services to Rugby Union Football. (Exeter, Devon)
- Michael Kevin Handel Beard. Team Leader, Ministry of Defence. For services to Defence. (Bristol, Gloucestershire)
- Louise Olivia Beaton. Trustee, Action with Communities in Rural England. For voluntary service to Rural Communities. (Chichester, West Sussex)
- Sarah Ann Beaumont. Lately Chief Executive Officer, Initiative for Social Entrepreneurs. For services to Social Enterprise. (Burton upon Trent, Staffordshire)
- Stephen Kwasi Bediako. Founder and Chairman, Social Innovation Partnership. For services to Innovation in the Charitable Sector, particularly during the Covid-19 Response. (London, Greater London)
- Andrew George Beet. Lately Police Staff, Office for Security and Counter Terrorism, Home Office. For services to Law and Order. (Maplethorpe, Lincolnshire)
- Amanda Jane Bennett. Executive Principal, Greetland Primary Academy, Calderdale and CEO, Great Heights Academy Trust. For services to Education in West Yorkshire. (Halifax, West Yorkshire)
- Beverly Patricia Bergman. For services to Veterans in Scotland. (Edinburgh)
- Farah Naz Kausar Bhatti. Consultant Cardiothoracic Surgeon. For services to Diversity in the NHS in Wales. (Swansea, West Glamorgan)
- Daniel Richard Rowley Bishop. Delivery Manager, Type 31 Frigate Programme, Ministry of Defence. For services to Defence Procurement. (Dursley, Gloucestershire)
- Paul Boyce. Director of Children's Services, Wirral Metropolitan Borough Council. For services to Children in Merseyside. (Liverpool, Merseyside)
- Donalda Macintyre Maclay Bradbury. Lately President, Scottish Rugby Union. For services to Rugby Union Football. (Oban, Argyll and Bute)
- Lynne Frances Bradley. Senior Plant Health and Seeds Inspector, Animal and Plant Health Agency. For services to Plant Health. (Ludlow, Shropshire)
- John Bradshaw. Lately, Head teacher, London East Alternative Provision. For services to Education in London. (London, Greater London)
- Caron Louise Bradshaw. Chief Executive, Charity Finance Group. For services to Charity. (Clophill, Bedfordshire)
- Emma Bradshaw. Executive Principal, Alternative Learning Trust. For services to Education in the Alternative Provision Sector. (London, Greater London)
- Geraldine Brereton. Deputy Director, Universal Credit Operations, Department for Communities, Northern Ireland Executive. For services to Social Security. (Belfast, County Down)
- Jonathan Britton. Non-Executive Director, British Business Bank. For services to Small Business Finance. (Lewes, East Sussex)
- Cassandra Anna Buchanan. Executive Headteacher, Charles Dickens Primary School, Southwark, London and Trust Leader, The Charter Schools Educational Trust. For services to Education. (Farnham, Surrey)
- Robert Oliver Buckingham. Robotics Director, UK Atomic Energy Authority. For services to Robotic Engineering. (Abingdon, Oxfordshire)
- Commodore Michael Peter Bullock MBE. Chief Executive, Northern Lighthouse Board. For services to the Safety and Welfare of Seafarers. (Edinburgh)
- Alan John Burnell. Co-founder and Non-Executive Director, Family Futures Community Interest Company, London. For services to Adopted Children. (London, Greater London)
- Susan Burns. Philanthropist. For charitable services. (London, Greater London)
- Malcolm Butler. Chair, UK Onshore Geophysical Library. For services to Education, to Research and to Development. (Paddock Wood, Kent)
- James David Forbes Calder TD. Professor, Department of Bioengineering, Imperial College London. For services to Sport and to Exercise. (Alresford, Hampshire)
- Robert Derek Calrow. For charitable and political service in North West England. (Bolton, Greater Manchester)
- Lorraine Canavan. Head, Payment Operation, H.M. Revenue and Customs. For services to Leadership and to Service Delivery. (Kilsyth, City of Glasgow)
- Marcello Antonio Casale. For services to Animal Welfare, particularly during the Covid-19 Response. (Slough, Buckinghamshire)
- Charlie Chapple. Head, Social Housing Redress, Ministry for Housing, Communities and Local Government. For services to Housing and to the Homeless. (London, Greater London)
- Mark Edward Cheeseman. Deputy Director, Public Sector Fraud, Cabinet Office. For public service. (Sevenoaks, Kent)
- Daniel John Clark. Head, Department of Clinical Engineering, Queens Medical Centre, Nottingham. For services to Clinical Engineering, particularly during Covid-19. (Nottingham, Nottinghamshire)
- Samantha Clayton. Principal Social Worker for Children and Families, Lincolnshire County Council. For services to Social Work. (Waddingham, Lincolnshire)
- Linda Clegg. Children's Service Improvement Adviser, St Helen's Council. For services to Social Work. (Blackburn, Lancashire)
- Natalie Clein. Cellist. For services to Music. (Swanage, Dorset)
- Rebecca Cobbin MBE. Family Jurisdictional Support Manager, H.M. Courts and Tribunals Service. For services to the Administration of Justice. (Evercreech, Somerset)
- Hermione Anne Phoebe Cockburn. Scientific Director, Dynamic Earth. For services to Public Engagement in Science. (Edinburgh)
- Barbara Collins. Head, Women in Leadership, Government Equalities Office. For services to Gender Equality. (Gravesend, Kent)
- Nicholas Keith Coni. Co-founder, University of the Third Age, Cambridge. For services to Education for Older People. (Cambridge, Cambridgeshire)
- Brendan Peter Connor. Lately Chair, Midlands Air Ambulance Charity. For voluntary and charitable services to the community in the West Midlands. (Coventry, West Midlands)
- Philip Andrew John Conran. Chair, Government Advisory Committee on Packaging. For services to Recycling and the Environment. (High Wycombe, Buckinghamshire)
- Alan Charles Cowdale. Senior Scientific Adviser, Air and Space Warfare Centre. For services to Defence. (Market Drayton, Lincolnshire)
- Benjamin Josef Cowell. Director General, Historic Houses Association. For services to Cultural Heritage, particularly during the Covid-19 Response. (Newport, Essex)
- Philomena Creffield. Lately Head, UK Central Authority, Home Office. For services to International Legal and Judicial Co-operation. (London, Greater London)
- Philip Critchlow. Chief Executive Officer and Founding Director, TBI Media. For services to Radio and to Television. (Stoke Hammond, Buckinghamshire)
- John Dalzell MBE. For services to Fundraising for the Southern Area Hospice, Newry. (Newry, County Down)
- Dan Dark. Lately Managing Director, Warner Brothers Studios, Leavesden. For services to the UK Film Industry. (Abroad)
- Matthew Davies. Deputy Director, Trade Agreements Continuity Programme, Department for International Trade. For services to International Trade. (London, Greater London)
- Katherine Sarah Jane Dawson. Founder and Director, The All-in-One Company. For services to Business and Frontline Workers during the Covid-19 Response through the Scrub Hub Ashington. (Newbiggin-by-the-Sea, Northumberland)
- Narmada Helen De Silva. Deputy Director, Strategic and Cross Cutting Policy Group, H.M. Revenue and Customs. For public service. (London, Greater London)
- Oliver Dearden. Volunteer, Bristol Aero Collection Trust. For services to Cultural Heritage in the Aviation Industry. (Westbury-on-Trym, Bristol)
- David Spencer Delew. Lately, Chief Executive, Community Security Trust. For services to the Jewish Community. (Prestwich, Greater Manchester)
- Louise Di Mambro. Registrar, Supreme Court and Judicial Committee of the Privy Council. For services to the Administration of Justice. (London, Greater London)
- Tanjit Singh Dosanjh. Founder and Chief Executive Officer, The Prison Opticians Trust. For services to Optometry in Prisons and Reducing Re-Offending. (Rochester, Kent)
- Robert Peter Douglas Miller. For services to Wildlife Conservation in Scotland. (Haddington, East Lothian)
- William Dudley FRSA. Stage Designer. For services to Stage Design. (London, Greater London)
- Joy Ann Duxbury. Professor of Mental Health, Manchester Metropolitan University. For services to Mental Health Nursing. (Preston, Lancashire)
- Gavin John Edgerley-Harris. Director, Gurkha Museum. For services to Gurkha and Military Heritage. (Winchester, Hampshire)
- Mohan Jayantha Edirisinghe FREng. Bonfield Chair of Biomaterials, University College London. For services to Biomedical Engineering. (London, Greater London)
- Nadim Ednan-Laperouse MBE. Co-founder and Trustee, Natasha Allergy Research Foundation. For services to People with Allergies. (London, Greater London)
- Tanya Ednan-Laperouse. Co-founder and Trustee, Natasha Allergy Research Foundation. For services to People with Allergies. (London, Greater London)
- Joan Mary Edwards. Director of Public Affairs and Living Seas, Royal Society of Wildlife Trusts. For services to Marine Conservation. (Plymouth, Devon)
- Melanie Teresa Elliott. Volunteer, SafeLives. For services to Victims of Domestic Abuse. (Attleborough, Norfolk)
- Thomas Vincent Emerson. Co-founder 6a Architects. For services to Architecture and Education. (London, Greater London)
- Alice Fairbain. Team Leader, Ministry of Defence. For services to Defence. (London, Greater London)
- Isabella Jean Farish. For services to the community in Dalbeattie and Kippford, Dumfries & Galloway. (Castle Douglas, Dumfries and Galloway)
- Michael Loughlin Fell. Head, Cyber Operations, H.M. Revenue and Customs. For public and voluntary service to security. (Otley, West Yorkshire)
- Edgar Joseph Feuchtwanger. Historian. For services to Anglo-German Understanding and History. (Winchester, Hampshire)
- Douglas John Field. Chair, New Anglia Local Enterprise Partnership. For services to Business in Norfolk and Suffolk. (Great Horkesley, Essex)
- Francesca Findlater. Founder and Chief Executive Officer, Bounce Back Foundation and Project. For services to Ex-offenders. (London, Greater London)
- Ann Marie Fitchett. Lately Policy and Legislation Principal, Defence Maritime Regulator. For services to Defence. (Worcester, Worcestershire)
- Josephine Lesley Fitton. Lately Curator, Greek Bronze Age Collections and Keeper, Department of Greece and Rome, British Museum. For services to Museums and to the Arts. (Harpenden, Hertfordshire)
- Terence Anthony Fitzpatrick. Founder and Director, ARC Adoption North East. For services to Children in North East England, particularly during the Covid-19 Response. (South Shields, Tyne and Wear)
- Sally Ann Forsyth. Chief Executive Officer, Stevenage Bioscience Catalyst. For services to Business and to Science. (Cambridge, Cambridgeshire)
- Alun Francis. Principal and Chief Executive Officer, Oldham College. For services to Education. (Oldham, Greater Manchester)
- Deborah Anne Francis. Managing Director, Direct Rail Services. For services to Women in the Railway Industry. (Warrington, Cheshire)
- Donna Karen Fraser. Equality, Diversity and Engagement Lead, UK Athletics. For services to Equality, to Inclusion and to Diversity in the Workplace. (Birmingham, West Midlands)
- Martin James Frobisher. Group Safety and Engineering Director, Technical Authority, Network Rail. For services to the NHS and Railway Workers during Covid-19 and voluntary service through the Army Reserves. (Sandbach, Cheshire)
- Dipanwita Ganguli. Principal, Sutton College. For services to Adult Education in London. (London, Greater London)
- Jennifer Dawn Garrett. Executive Coach and Leadership Development Specialist, Reflexion Associates Ltd. For services to Entrepreneurship and to Women in Business. (Hemel Hempstead, Hertfordshire)
- Stuart Paul Gibbons. Managing Director, Le Mark Group. For services to International Trade. (Holme, Cambridgeshire)
- Nigel Gibbs. Unit Head, Appeals and Review Unit, Special Crime and Counter Terrorism Division, Crown Prosecution Service. For services to Law and Order. (Wetherby, West Yorkshire)
- Valerie Gibson. Professor of High Energy Physics, University of Cambridge. For services to Science, Women in Science and to Public Engagement. (Cambridge, Cambridgeshire)
- Grant Gordon. Founder and Chair, The Childhood Trust. For services to Philanthropy, particularly during the Covid-19 Response. (London, Greater London)
- Sharran Louise Grey. Haematology Consultant Clinical Scientist, Blackpool Teaching Hospitals NHS Foundation Trust and Principal Clinical Scientist, Bolton NHS Foundation Trust. For services to Blood Transfusion and to Patient Care. (Bolton, Greater Manchester)
- Judith Anne Halkerston. Chair, Symphonic. For services to the Digital Economy. (Edinburgh)
- Dawn Michelle Hall. Adult, Family and Community Learning Manager, Doncaster. For services to Further Education in South Yorkshire. (Doncaster, South Yorkshire)
- Roger Michael Owen Hall. Medical Director, Royal Papworth Hospital NHS Foundation Trust. For services to the NHS and the Covid-19 Response in the East of England. (Cambridge, Cambridgeshire)
- Lee Hallam. Chief Executive Officer and Founder, Linbrooke Services Ltd. For services to Business and to Skills. (Sheffield, South Yorkshire)
- John Hambly. Founder, Samson Centre for Multiple Sclerosis. For services to People with Disabilities in Surrey and the Home Counties. (Milford, Surrey)
- Kirsty Sian Hamilton. For services to the Green Energy, the Finance Sector and Climate Change. (London, Greater London)
- Matthew Hampson. Founder, Matt Hampson Foundation. For voluntary and charitable service. (Cold Overton, Leicestershire)
- Gemma Clare Harper. For services to the Marine Environment. (Alton, Hampshire)
- Linda Diane Harris. Chair, Health and Justice Clinical Reference Group, NHS England . For services to the NHS. (Wetherby, West Yorkshire)
- Adrian Richard Hawkins. Managing Director, Welding World Ltd and Founder, Weldability Sif. For services to Business. (Hitchin, Hertfordshire)
- Barry Maurice William Hearn. For services to Sport. (Chelmsford, Essex)
- Joanne Louise Heaton. Chief Executive Officer, Northern Lights Learning Trust, Hartlepool. For services to Education in North East England. (Hartlepool, County Durham)
- Fergus Henderson MBE. Chef and Restaurateur. For services to the Culinary Arts. (London, Greater London)
- Margot Henderson. Chef. For services to the Culinary Arts. (London, Greater London)
- Christine Ann Hill. Headteacher, Westminster School, Rowley Regis. For services to Children and Young People with Special Educational Needs and Disabilities. (Stourbridge, West Midlands)
- Christopher John Stratford Hodges. Professor of Justice Systems and Head, CMS Research Programme. For services to Business and Law. (Bicester, Oxfordshire)
- Stuart Gary Hopps. Choreographer. For services to Dance. (Deal, Kent)
- Richard Horton. Team Leader, Ministry of Defence. For services to Defence. (London, Greater London)
- Susan Jane Husband. Director, Business in the Community, Cymru and lately Director, Employer and Employee Engagement, Education and Skills Funding Agency. For services to Education. (Barry, Vale of Glamorgan)
- Jane Ide. Lately Chief Executive, National Association for Voluntary and Community Action. For services to Volunteering and to Charity. (Youlgrave, Derbyshire)
- Fozia Tanvir Irfan. Chief Executive Officer, Bedfordshire and Luton Community Foundation and Trustee, Association of Charitable Foundations. For services to the community in Bedfordshire, particularly during the Covid-19 Response. (Watford, Hertfordshire)
- Giovanni Isingrini. Group Director and Deputy Chief Executive, Rhondda Cynon Taf Council. For services to Children in Wales. (Pontypridd, Mid Glamorgan)
- Mary Jones. Lately Deputy Director, Home Affairs and EU Exit, Cabinet Office. For public service. (London, Greater London)
- Adele Diana Jones. Professor of Social Work, University of Huddersfield. For services to Vulnerable Women and Children. (Manchester, Greater Manchester)
- Toby Edward Heslewood Jones. Actor. For services to Drama. (London, Greater London)
- Roger Hugh Jones. Consulting Editor, British Journal of General Practice. For services to General Practice. (London, Greater London)
- Margaret Ann Jones. Deputy Presiding Officer, Senedd Cymru. For parliamentary and public service in Cymru. (Rhyl, Denbighshire)
- Larissa Joy. Chair, Social Business Trust and Foundling Museum. For services to the Charitable, Voluntary and Social Enterprise Sectors. (London, Greater London)
- Partha Sarathi Kar. Consultant and Endocrinologist, Portsmouth Hospitals NHS Trust. For services to People with Diabetes. (Southsea, Hampshire)
- Daniel Martin Kelly. Chair, Nursing Research, Royal College of Nursing, Cardiff University. For services to Cancer Care Research and Education Nationally and Internationally. (London, Greater London)
- Philip Larkin. Deputy Head, Special Cases Unit, Office for Security and Counter Terrorism, Home Office. For services to National Security. (Ormskirk, Lancashire)
- Robert William Lawson. Chair of Governors, Education Partnership North East. For services to Education in Sunderland. (Sunderland, Tyne and Wear)
- Karen Lee. Director, One Service Group, North West England, Department for Work and Pensions. For services to the Delivery of Public Services. (Darwen, Lancashire)
- Jennifer Lee. Potter. For services to Ceramics. (London, Greater London)
- Richard Anthony Lee. Chief People Officer, Willmott Dixon. For services to Business and Equality. (Longthorpe, Cambridgeshire)
- John George Lillywhite. Chair, Kainos. For services to the Technology Sector in Northern Ireland. (Leatherhead, Surrey)
- John Liversidge. Lately Senior Manager, TecSOS. For services to Victims of Domestic Abuse. (Witney, Oxfordshire)
- Robert Lockyer-Nibbs (Bob Lockyer). For services to Dance and Broadcasting. (Lewes, East Sussex)
- Ian Frank Lush. Chief Executive, Imperial Health Charity. For charitable services to the NHS. (London, Greater London)
- Stephanie Macdonald. Co-founder 6a Architects. For services to Architecture. (London, Greater London)
- Robert Hywel MacFarlane. Deputy Director, Doctrine and Training, Civil Contingencies Secretariat, Cabinet Office. For public service. (Houghton-le-Spring, Tyne and Wear)
- Carol Jane Mack. Chief Executive, Association of Charitable Foundations. For services to Charity. (Barry, Vale of Glamorgan)
- Linda Mary Magrath. Chief Executive Officer, Laurus Trust. For services to Education in Greater Manchester. (Stockport, Greater Manchester)
- Lorraine Lucy Maltby Professor of Environmental Biology, University of Sheffield. For services to Environmental Biology, Animal and Plant Sciences. (Sheffield, South Yorkshire)
- Sarah Heide Marchant. Area Business Manager, Crown Prosecution Service, South West. For services to Law and Order. (Stanton Drew, Bristol)
- John Michael Breon Margeson. For services to Mountain Rescue. (Kirkby-in-Furness, Cumbria)
- Wayne Marshall. Conductor and Organist. For services to Music. (Abroad)
- Loraine Frances Martins MBE. Director, Diversity and Inclusion, Network Rail. For services to Diversity and Inclusion. (London, Greater London)
- Philip Joseph McGarry DL. For services to Mental Health and to the community in Belfast. (Belfast)
- Iain McNeill. Deputy Director, H.M. Revenue and Customs. For services to the Tax System. (Oldham, Greater Manchester)
- Susan Jessica McVeigh MBE. Head, Tax Apprenticeship Employer-Provider, H.M. Revenue and Customs. For services to Tax and Compliance Apprenticeships. (South Shields, Tyne and Wear)
- Ann McVie. Deputy Director, Social Security Policy, Scottish Government. For public service. (Linlithgow, West Lothian)
- John David Medland. Policy Manager, BT. For services to Public Safety. (Huddersfield, West Yorkshire)
- Jed Mercurio. Writer and Producer. For services to Television Drama. (London, Greater London)
- Caragh Merrick. Trustee and Chair of Finance Committee, Universities and Colleges Admissions Service. For services to Higher Education. (Worcester, Worcestershire)
- Joanne Monck. Independent Advisor and Global LGBT Advocate. For services to Transgender Equality. (Lancing, West Sussex)
- Luke Andrew Montague. Lately Co-ordinator, Talks Process, Northern Ireland Office. For services to the Peace Process in Northern Ireland. (London, Greater London)
- Suneetha Ramani Moonesinghe. Professor of Perioperative Medicine and Consultant Anaesthetist, University College London. For services to Anaesthesia, Perioperative and Critical Care. (Uckfield, East Sussex)
- Alan John Lindsay Kennedy Moore MBE. For services to Mass Incident Emergency Planning in Northern Ireland. (Derry)
- Harvey Kleis Moore. For services to Defence during Covid-19. (Hertford, Hertfordshire)
- Professor Christopher Gerrard Moran. National Clinical Director for Trauma, NHS England and NHS Improvement. For services to Trauma Surgery. (Nottingham, Nottinghamshire)
- Nicholas James Morgan. Section Head, Crime Patterns, Crime and Policing Analysis Unit, Home Office. For services to Community Safety. (Godalming, Surrey)
- Darryl Sean Ewing Morgan. Headteacher, Ridgeway School, Farnham. For services to Children and Young People with Special Educational Needs and Disabilities in Surrey. (Alton, Hampshire)
- Catherine Morgan. Chief Nurse, East of England Region, NHS England and NHS Improvement. For services to Nursing. (Eyke, Suffolk)
- Jerome Patrick Mullen. Director, Newry Chamber of Commerce and the Clamry Group. For services to the Economy in Northern Ireland and to Polish-Northern Irish Relations. (Warrenpoint, County Down)
- John Cruddas Murray. Lately Chief Executive, Society of Maritime Industries. For services to the UK Maritime Sector. (Harpenden, Hertfordshire)
- Gunther Alois Newcombe. Lately Director, Operations, Oil and Gas Authority. For services to the Oil and Gas Sector. (Bieldside, City of Aberdeen)
- Nicola Newton. Team Leader, Ministry of Defence. For services to Defence. (London, Greater London)
- Katherine Nicholls. Chief Executive Officer, UKHospitality. For services to the Hospitality Sector, particularly during the Covid-19 Response. (London, Greater London)
- David Roydon Nightingale. Senior Deputy Vice-Chancellor, University of Kent. For services to Higher Education. (Canterbury, Kent)
- Clare Joanna Threlfall Normand. Founder, Alec Normand Fund. For services to Brain Tumour charities. (Baughurst, Hampshire)
- Hunada Nouss. Chair, Audit and Risk Committee, Education and Skills Funding Agency. For public service. (London, Greater London)
- Angela Joanne O'Brien. Primary Director, Spencer Academies Trust and Former Principal of Wyndham Academy. For services to Education. (Derby, Derbyshire)
- William Patrick Thomas O'Hara. For services to Sailing. (Bangor, County Down)
- Samantha Orde. National Chair, Riding for the Disabled Association. For services to People with Disabilities. (Morpeth, Northumberland)
- Angela Mary Owen. Founder, Women in Defence UK. For services to Women in the Defence Sector. (Alton, Hampshire)
- John David Owen. Director, Strategic Business Resilience, House of Commons and House of Lords. For services to Parliament, particularly during Covid-19. (London, Greater London)
- June Miriam Palmer. Headteacher, Mayfield School, Torquay. For services to Children and Young People with Special Educational Needs and Disabilities. (Brixham, Devon)
- Lee Pardy-Mclaughlin. Child and Family Principal Social Worker, Coventry City Council. For services to Children and to Families. (Hixon, Staffordshire)
- Rosalyn Julia Parker. Principal, Southend Adult Community College. For services to Adult Education and to the community in Southend, Essex. (Rochford, Essex)
- Jon Parker. Team Leader, Ministry of Defence. For services to Defence. (London, Greater London)
- Anne Sally Paterson. Chief Education Officer and Head of Education Service, Argyll and Bute Council. For services to Education. (Minard, Argyll and Bute)
- Richard Cumming Paterson. Master Blender, Whyte and Mackay Ltd. For services to the Scotch Whisky Industry. (Troon, Ayrshire)
- William Paterson. For services to the Economy and to the community in Scotland. (Coatbridge, Lanarkshire)
- Sara Louise Pepper. Director of Creative Economy, Cardiff University. For services to the Creative Economy. (Cardiff, South Glamorgan)
- Simon Keith Pirotte. Principal, Bridgend College. For services to Further and Higher Education in Wales. (Ystradgynlais, Powys)
- William Ian David Plaistowe. For services to the care of the Elderly and Education. (Watlington, Oxfordshire)
- Rosemary Janet Pope. For services to Charitable Fundraising. (Princes Risborough, Buckinghamshire)
- Anthony Charles Russell Price TD. Chief Executive, Swanbarton Ltd. For services to the Energy Storage Industry. (Malmesbury, Wiltshire)
- Ruth Anne Purdie. Chief Executive, UK Road Offender Education. For services to Road Safety and to Policing. (Brighton, East Sussex)
- Sharon Pursey. Co-founder, SafeToNet. For services to International Trade. (Woodbridge, Suffolk)
- The Right Honourable The Lord Rana MBE. Chairman, Andras House Ltd. For services to Business and to the Economy in Northern Ireland. (Belfast)
- Asiyah Ravat. Executive Principal, Star Academies. For services to Education in Birmingham. (Walsall, West Midlands)
- Tracey Lynne Reed. Lately Director, Historic Properties, English Heritage. For services to Cultural Heritage. (Deal, Kent)
- Myrddin Rees. Consultant General and Hepatobiliary Surgeon, Hampshire Hospitals NHS Foundation Trust. For services to Liver Cancer Surgery. (Basingstoke, Hampshire)
- Patricia Gail Rice. Chair, School Teachers' Review Body. For services to Education. (Garsington, Oxfordshire)
- David Thomas Richards. Director of Governance and Ethics, Welsh Government. For public service. (Cardiff, South Glamorgan)
- Brian Roberts. Finance Commissioner, Ministry for Housing, Communities and Local Government. For services to Local Government and to Public Service Finance. (Stafford, Staffordshire)
- Sarah Robinson. For services to Heritage. (London, Greater London)
- Eric Robson. Honorary President, Cumbria Tourism. For services to Tourism. (Wasdale, Cumbria)
- Hugh Max Rolo. Chair and Founding Member, Key Fund. For services to Social Investment and Enterprise in the Midlands and North of England. (Bradford, West Yorkshire)
- Nicholas John Rust. Lately Chief Executive, British Horseracing Authority. For services to Horseracing. (York, North Yorkshire)
- Mark Philip Sautereau. Deputy Director, Department for Environment, Food and Rural Affairs. For services to the Food Supply Chain and the Vulnerable, particularly during the Covid-19 Response. (Princes Risborough, Buckinghamshire)
- Carolyn Savage. Head, Apprentice Engagement, Education and Skills Funding Agency. For services to Apprenticeships and Skills. (Piddington, Northamptonshire)
- Michael Vincent Shanahan. Deputy National Head, Emergency Preparedness, Resilience and Response, NHS England. For services to the NHS. (Driffield, East Riding of Yorkshire)
- Oliver Edward Pattison Shanks. For services to the Vulnerable in Northern Ireland. (Belfast)
- Rowena Marie Shaw. For services to Education and to Young People. (London, Greater London)
- Linda Grace Shears. Co-founder, Shears Foundation. For services to Charity. (Harrogate, North Yorkshire)
- Jacqueline Claudette Shears. Programme Director, NHS Digital. For services to Patient Care. (West Bridgford, Nottinghamshire)
- Isobel Sheldon. Director, Business Development, UK Battery Industrialisation Centre. For services to Motor Vehicle Battery Technology. (Huntingdonshire, Cambridgeshire)
- Janet Valerie Sheriff. Headteacher and National Leader of Education, Prince Henry's Grammar School, Otley. For services to Education in West Yorkshire. (Harrogate, North Yorkshire)
- Karl Simons. Chief Health, Safety and Wellbeing Officer, Thames Water. For services to Mental Health Policy. (Ringwood, Hampshire)
- Jeremy Lewis Simons. Lately Chairman, Port and City of London Health and Environmental Services Committee. For services to Air Quality and to Environmental Conservation in London. (London, Greater London)
- Moira Sarah Sinclair. Chief Executive Officer, Paul Hamlyn Foundation. For services to Charity and the Arts. (Berkhamsted, Hertfordshire)
- Mrunal Sisodia. Co-chair, National Network of Parent Carer Forums. For services to Children and Young People with Special Educational Needs and Disabilities, particularly during the Covid-19 Response. (Bedford, Bedfordshire)
- Jon Smith. Founder, Lee Smith Research Foundation. For charitable services to Leukemia Research. (London, Greater London)
- David Michael Smith. Deputy Managing Director, Parliamentary Digital Service. For services to Parliament, particularly during the Covid-19 Response. (Saffron Walden, Essex)
- Phillipa Maria Spencer. Senior Principal Statistician, Defence Science and Technology Laboratory. For services to Defence, particularly during the Covid-19 Response. (Stockbridge, Hampshire)
- Anthony John Spiro. Joint President, Wiener Holocaust Library. For voluntary service to Holocaust Remembrance. (London, Greater London)
- Craig Stephenson. For services to Parliament and to Equality. (Penarth, Vale of Glamorgan)
- Alan Stewart. Hairdresser. For services to Hairdressing. (Langbank, Renfrewshire)
- Linda Elizabeth Stewart. Hairdresser. For services to Hairdressing. (Langbank, Renfrewshire)
- Kathleen Mary Linn Stock. Professor of Philosophy, University of Sussex. For services to Higher Education. (Lewes, East Sussex)
- Carole Mary Stott MBE. Lately Chair, Association of Colleges and Find a Future. For services to Education. (Bath, Somerset)
- Eleanor Phobe Jane Stride FREng. Statutory Professor of Biomaterials, University of Oxford. For services to Engineering. (Oxford, Oxfordshire)
- Matthew John Stutely. Director of Software Engineering, Parliamentary Digital Service. For services to Parliament during Covid-19. (Rochester, Kent)
- Emma Sweeting. Team Leader, National Crime Agency. For services to Law and Order. (London, Greater London)
- Emma Swingwood. Physiotherapist, University Hospitals Bristol and Weston NHS Foundation Trust. For services to Physiotherapy. (Monmouthshire, Gwent)
- Claudia Claire Sykes. Chief Executive Officer, Social Enterprise Kent and All Seasons Community Support. For services to Social Enterprise and to the Social Care Sector. (Whitstable, Kent)
- Ellen Thinnesen. Chief Executive, Sunderland College. For services to Education. (Grimsby, Lincolnshire)
- Neil Edward Michael Thomas. Governor, H.M. Prison Stocken. For services to H.M. Prison and Probation Service, particularly during the Covid-19 Response. (Whissendine, Rutland)
- Michael Tobias. For services to the Jewish Community. (Giffnock, Renfrewshire)
- Christopher Michael Tyas. Chair, Food Resilience Industry Forum. For services to the Food Supply Chain during the Covid-19 Response. (Chichester, West Sussex)
- Paul Van Heyningen. Deputy Director, Net Zero Electricity Networks, Department for Business, Energy and Industrial Strategy. For services to Energy Policy. (London, Greater London)
- Tracy Amanda Vegro. Executive Director, Resources and Strategy, Financial Reporting Council. For services to Business and to Diversity. (London, Greater London)
- Paul Venners. Managing Director, LEEC Ltd. For services to Hospital Mortuaries and to Post-Mortem Facilities, particularly during the Covid-19 Response. (Worksop, Nottinghamshire)
- Jayne Mary Vertkin. Head of Early Help, Westminster City Council. For services to Children in London. (London, Greater London)
- Nina Wadia. For services to Entertainment and to Charity. (Staines, Surrey)
- Sarah Victoria Wallace. Consultant Speech and Language Therapist, Critical Care, Wythenshaw Hospital, Manchester University NHS Foundation Trust. For services to the NHS. (Tarporley, Cheshire)
- Gajan Lavan Wallooppillai. For services to Equality and to Community Cohesion. (London, Greater London)
- David Alan John Walrond. Principal and Chair, Truro and Penwith College and Callywith College. For services to Further Education in Cornwall. (Truro, Cornwall)
- Adeela Warley. Chief Executive, CharityComms. For services to Charity Communications. (London, Greater London)
- Alan Douglas Watson. Chair and Captain, The Medusa Trust. For services to Maritime History and to Charity. (Eastleigh, Hampshire)
- Matthew Richard West. Consultant, Centre for National Infrastructure. For services to Information Management in Business. (Fareham, Hampshire)
- Helen Catherine Mortimer Whitehouse. Deputy Director, Museums and Cultural Property, Department for Digital, Culture, Media and Sport. For services to Museums and to Heritage. (London, Greater London)
- Karen Stephanie Williams. For services to Victims of Domestic Abuse. (Coldgeld, Derbyshire)
- Paul Daniel Williams. Lately Member of Parliament for Stockton South. For services to Parliament and to Healthcare in Stockton-on-Tees. (Stockton-on-Tees, County Durham)
- Michael Wood. Historian and Broadcaster. For services to Public History and to Broadcasting. (London, Greater London)
- Frances Mary Alexandra Woolley. Lately General Counsel, Ofcom. For services to the Public Sector and Communications Regulation. (London, Greater London)

==== Member of the Order of the British Empire (MBE) ====
Military

- Major P. Patel
- Major Y. R. Stephens
- Squadron Leader D. J. Higgins
- Squadron Leader J. White
- Squadron Leader S. G. Williams
- Lieutenant J. L. Dyson, ARRC
- Warrant Officer (now Flight Lieutenant) S. A. Graham
- Chief Petty Officer Medical Assistant P. Towers
- Acting Sergeant R. G. Campion
- Corporal (now acting Sergeant) R. Wardlow
- Corporal A. G. M. Oytaben
- Acting Corporal (now Lance Corporal) L. A. Wylde
- G. Grewal (Civil Servant)
- Lieutenant Commander James Betchley, COMOPS Northwood
- Lieutenant Commander Royal Naval Reserve (Sea Cadet Corps) D Collins, District Officer, Merseyside District Sea Cadets
- Lieutenant Jenny Dyson, ARRC, QARNNS, Nursing Officer, Joint Hospital Group (South East)
- Lieutenant Commander Beth Griffiths, HMS Richmond
- Lieutenant Commander Sean Heaton, Commanding Officer, Southern Diving Group
- Major Patrick Hill, Staff Officer Information Activity, 30 Commando Brigade Information Exploitation Group
- Warrant Officer 1 (Regimental Sergeant Major) David Mason RM, Royal Marines Corps Regimental Sergeant Major
- Warrant Officer 1 Engineering Technician (Marine Engineering) S J Smith, Marine Engineer Officer HMS Severn
- Chief Petty Officer Medical Assistant Philip Towers
- Warrant Officer 1 Logistician (Supply Chain) G R White, HMS Prince of Wales

Civil

- Caroline Margaret Adams. Political Officer, Parliamentary Labour Party. For political service. (London, Greater London)
- Adewale Olukayode Adebajo. Consultant Rheumatologist, Barnsley Hospital NHS Foundation Trust. For services to Inclusive Patient and to Public Involvement in Research. (Sheffield, South Yorkshire)
- Alka Surajprakash Ahuja. Consultant Child and Adolescent Psychiatrist, Royal College of Psychiatrists (Wales). For services to the NHS during Covid-19. (Cardiff, South Glamorgan)
- Kevin Michael Aitchison. For services to Wheelchair Rugby and to People with Disabilities. (Eynsford, Kent)
- Nwamaka Carol Akiwumi. Founder and Chief Executive Officer, Money4You. For services to Financial Education during Covid-19. (London, Greater London)
- Norah Al-Ani. Director, Cambridge Rape Crisis Centre. For services to Social Justice and to Gender Equality. (Cambridge, Cambridgeshire)
- Laura Patricia Alcock-Ferguson. Founding Director, Campaign to End Loneliness. For services to People Experiencing Loneliness in Later Life. (Galashiels, Scottish Borders)
- Laurence John Alison. Director of the National Centre for the Study of Critical Incident Decision Making, University of Liverpool. For services to Critical Incident Handling and to the NHS during Covid-19. (Greenfield, Clwyd)
- Malique Jamal Al-Shabazz. Constable, Merseyside Police. For services to Policing and Ethnic Minority Communities in Merseyside. (Prenton, Merseyside)
- Nisreen Ala-Din Sahib Alwan. Associate Professor in Public Health, Southampton University. For services to Medicine and Public Health during COVID-19. (Eastleigh, Hampshire)
- Paul Amadi. Chief Support Officer, British Red Cross. For charitable services. (London, Greater London)
- Carla Andrews. Founder and Managing Director, Motivated Minds. For services to Wellbeing in Essex. (Basildon, Essex)
- Shane Peter Andrews. Project Operations Interface Specialist, Network Rail. For services to Diversity and to Inclusion. (Cardiff, South Glamorgan)
- Raymond Antrobus FRSL. Poet. For services to Literature. (London, Greater London)
- Alan Armson. For services to the community in Northamptonshire. (Rushden, Northamptonshire)
- Humza Arshad. Comedian and Writer. For services to Education. (London, Greater London)
- Janet Cicely Arthur. For services to the community in Smeeton Westerby, Leicestershire. (Leicester, Leicestershire)
- Keith Henry Francis Aston. For services to the community in Bristol. (Bristol)
- David John Bagley. Co-founder, Urban Outreach. For services to the community in Bolton, Greater Manchester, particularly during Covid-19. (Bolton, Greater Manchester)
- Christine Bagley. Co-founder, Urban Outreach. For services to the community in Bolton, Greater Manchester, particularly during Covid-19. (Bolton, Greater Manchester)
- Alison Judith Bailey Castellina. Technical Standards Lead, Heat Networks, Department for Business, Energy and Industrial Strategy. For services to Consumer Protection and to Diversity and Inclusion. (Tunbridge Wells, Kent)
- Andrew Baker. Founder, Play2Give. For services to Charity. (Didcot, Oxfordshire)
- Anne Isobel Baker. Volunteer Fundraiser, NSPCC. For charitable services, particularly during Covid-19. (Salisbury, Wiltshire)
- David Edward Ballard. For services to Education, to Health and to Social Care. (London, Greater London)
- John Bamford. Patient Safety Campaigner. For services to Patient Safety in the NHS. (Poulton-le-Fylde, Lancashire)
- Peter John Barham. For services to Maritime Sector. (Saddleworth, Greater Manchester)
- Lee David Barnard. Detective Inspector, Metropolitan Police Service. For services to Policing and to Victims of Domestic Abuse. (London, Greater London)
- Monica Barnes. Chair, Resident Strategy Group, Optivo. For services to Social Housing. (London, Greater London)
- Douglas Gordon Fleming Barrow. Member, Court of Common Council and Lately Chairman, Police Authority Board, City of London. For services to the Maritime Sector and to the City of London. (Loudwater, Buckinghamshire)
- Hannah Barry. Founder, Bold Tendencies. For services to Contemporary Art in London. (London, Greater London)
- Gregory John Barton. Specialist Pharmacist, Critical Care and Burns, St Helens and Knowsley NHS Teaching Hospitals Trust and Chair, United Kingdom Clinical Pharmacy Association, Critical Care Group. For services to Pharmacy, particularly during Covid-19. (St Helens, Merseyside)
- Kathleen Beavan. For services to Agriculture. (Abergavenny, Gwent)
- Sacha Paul Bedding. Chief Executive Officer, The Wharton Trust. For services to the community in Hartlepool, particularly during Covid-19. (Hartlepool, County Durham)
- Jacqueline Mary Bell. Owner and Manager, Jaybees Nursery, Lochmaben. For services to Education and to Charity. (Lochmaben, Dumfries and Galloway)
- Christine Dominique Beresford. Chair of Trustees, Whitchurch Silk Mill Trust and Winchester Military Museum. For services to Cultural Heritage in Hampshire. (Andover, Hampshire)
- Thomas Bernard Nicholas Best. Clinical Director, Critical Care, King's College Hospital NHS Foundation Trust. For services to Critical Care, particularly during Covid-19. (London, Greater London)
- Rabinder Nath Bhanot JP. For services to Wellbeing and Community Action, particularly during the Covid-19 Response. (Chigwell, Essex)
- Harnovdeep Singh Bharaj. Consultant, Diabetes and General Medicine, Bolton NHS Foundation Trust. For services to People with Diabetes in the South Asian Community. (Bolton, Greater Manchester)
- Mark William Charles Bignell. Chief Executive, Hamoaze House. For services to People with Problematic Use of Alcohol and Other Substances in Plymouth. (Fowey, Cornwall)
- Colin Billingsley. Customer Service Lead, Work and Health North West, Department for Work and Pensions. For public and charitable services. (Crosby, Merseyside)
- Alan Henry Black. For services to the community in South Armagh. (Newry, County Armagh)
- Nicola Black. Head, Parkhead Community Nursery. For services to Pre-School Education and to the community in Glasgow. (Burnside, City of Glasgow)
- Elizabeth Ann Blades. For services to the community in Scarborough, North Yorkshire. (Scarborough, North Yorkshire)
- Colleen Isla Blair. Regional Swimming Development Manager, Scottish Swimming and Open Water Adventurer. For services to Swimming. (Aberfeldy, Angus)
- Anne Blake. For services to Adults with Learning Disabilities in Lisburn, Northern Ireland. (Lisburn, County Antrim)
- Rosalind Jane Blundell. Product Manager, Digital, Data and Technology Team, Home Office. For services to Immigration and Border Technology. (Horsham, West Sussex)
- Laura Claire Bounds. Managing Director, Kent Crisps. For services to International Trade. (Woodnesborough, Kent)
- Kristian Bowles. Consultant Haematologist and Associate Medical Director of Research and Innovation, Norfolk and Norwich University Hospitals NHS Foundation Trust. For services to the NHS during Covid-19. (Norwich, Norfolk)
- Norman Boxall. Volunteer, Boys' Brigade and Scouts. For voluntary service to Young People. (Reading, Berkshire)
- Lesley Braiden. Lately Academic Registrar, Newcastle University. For services to Higher Education. (Ponteland, Northumberland)
- Mark Alan Brandon. Professor of Polar Oceanography, Open University. For services to Polar Science. (London, Greater London)
- Rosemary Elizabeth Brewster. Senior Physiotherapist, Roxburghe House Hospice, Royal Victoria Hospital, Dundee. For services to End of Life Care. (Kirriemuir, Angus)
- Andrew David Briggs. Volunteer, NSPCC. For services to Children. (London, Greater London)
- Michael David Briggs. Executive Director, East Belfast Community Development Agency. For services to the Voluntary Sector and to the community in East Belfast. (Belfast, County Down)
- Diana Marilyn Britten. For services to Aerobatics and to Charity. (Chobham, Surrey)
- Dawn June Brooker. Professor, Association for Dementia Studies, University of Worcester. For services to People Affected by Dementia. (Malvern, Worcestershire)
- Daniel Legh Brooks. Chief Executive Officer, Virtual Human Resources. For services to International Trade. (London, Greater London)
- Paul Vincent Brooks. Director of Patient Experience, University Hospitals of Derby and Burton NHS Foundation Trust. For services to Healthcare Leadership. (Derby, Derbyshire)
- Anna Victoria Brown. Head of Plant Health, Forestry and Contingency, Forestry Commission. For services to Forest Pathology. (Working, Hampshire)
- Cheryl-Lee Brown. For services to Children and to Families in Midlothian. (Livingston, West Lothian)
- Richard Christopher Brown. Co-chair, Ataxia UK. For services to People with Disabilities and to the community in Middle Barton, Oxfordshire. (Chipping Norton, Oxfordshire)
- Alastair James Burn. Principal Specialist, Water and Pollution. For voluntary service to Nature Conservation in Cambridgeshire. (Ely, Cambridgeshire)
- Robert Geoffrey Burrow. For services to Rugby and to Motor Neurone Disease Awareness during Covid-19. (Pontefract, West Yorkshire)
- Jacqueline Burt. Chair, Brain Injury Social Work Group. For services to People with Brain Injuries. (Stoke Climsland, Cornwall)
- Kevin James Byrne. Managing Director, Seymour Civil Engineering. For services to Business and to Skills. (Stockton-on-Tees, County Durham)
- Richard John Campbell. For services to the community in the West Midlands. (Droitwich Spa, Worcestershire)
- Christine Nancy Campbell. Culture Collection Manager, Scottish Association for Marine Scientists. For services to Marine Science. (Oban, Argyll and Bute)
- Captain Barbara Campbell. Master, Jubilee Sailing Trust. For services to the Vulnerable. (Dunoon, Argyll and Bute)
- Lawrence Victor Cantle. For services to Megacentre in Rayleigh, Essex. (Hockley, Essex)
- Derek Capper. For services to Young People in Northern Ireland. (Craigavon, County Armagh)
- Lisa Jane Capper. Lately Chair, National Deaf Children's Society. For services to Young People. (Bushby, Leicestershire)
- Hazel Carson. For services to People with Genetic High Risk of Cancer in Northern Ireland. (Ballynahinch, County Down)
- Norman David Carson. For services to Charity and to the community in Northern Ireland. (Newtownards, County Down)
- Jonathan Carter. Chief Engineer Stealth, Atlas Elektronik UK. For services to Naval Operational Effectiveness. (Weymouth, Dorset)
- Halima Jade Cassell. Sculptor. For services to Art. (Aston-upon-Clyne, Shropshire)
- Philip Cassidy. Global Executive Vice President, Concentrix. For services to Entrepreneurship, to Business and to the Economy in Northern Ireland. (Belfast)
- Katrina Cathie. Consultant Paediatrician, University Hospital Southampton. For services to Paediatrics and the Covid-19 Response. (Southampton, Hampshire)
- Julie Cawthorne. Infection, Prevention and Control Assistant Chief Nurse and Clinical Director, Manchester University NHS Foundation Trust. For services to Nursing and the Covid-19 Response. (Poynton, Cheshire)
- Barbara Lesley Chadwick. Professor of Paediatric Dentistry and Director, Education and Students School of Dentistry, Cardiff University. For services to Paediatric Dental Health. (Monmouthshire, Gwent)
- Sally Clare Challis-Manning. Principal, Brinsbury College, Pulborough. For services to Further Education in West Sussex. (Horsham, West Sussex)
- Dawn Cheetham. For services to Business and to the community in Lancashire. (Garstang, Lancashire)
- Anand John Chitnis. General Practitioner, The Castle Practice, Birmingham. For services to the NHS, Mental Health and Disabilities. (Sutton Coldfield, West Midlands)
- Aquiline Chivinge. Senior Nurse Research Leader, Nottingham University Hospitals NHS Trust. For services to Patients from Ethnic Minority Backgrounds. (Beeston, Nottinghamshire)
- Lynne Patricia Christopher. Deputy Principal, Isle of Wight College. For services to Further Education. (Newport, Isle of Wight)
- Peter Clarke. For services to the Outer Hebrides and to the community in Tottenham, London. (London, Greater London)
- Michael Ewan Clarke. For services to Public Libraries and to voluntary service in London during Covid-19. (London, Greater London)
- Sarah Elizabeth Clarke. Director and Lead Nurse, Adult Critical Care and Major Trauma Operational Delivery Networks, Cheshire and Merseyside. For services to Nursing and to the Covid-19 Response. (Market Drayton, Shropshire)
- Steven Clarke. Managing Director, Bidfood Wholesale Depots. For services to the Vulnerable during Covid-19. (St Albans, Hertfordshire)
- Jonathan Sydney Claypole. Director, BBC Arts. For services to the Creation of the Culture in Quarantine Virtual Festival of Arts during Covid-19. (London, Greater London)
- Barbara Maureen Cline. For services to the community in Leeds, West Yorkshire. (Leeds, West Yorkshire)
- Pamela Fry Clouston JP. For services to the community in North East England. (Rothbury, Northumberland)
- Emma Cobley. Principal, Foxes Academy Residential SEN College. For services to Young People with Special Educational Needs and Disabilities. (Minehead, Somerset)
- Geoffrey Allan Codd FRSE. Emeritus Professor of Microbiology, University of Dundee. For services to Water Quality. (Longforgan, Perth and Kinross)
- Caroline Collender. Homeless Outreach Worker, South London District, Department for Work and Pensions. For services to the Homeless. (London, Greater London)
- Shirley Jane Collier. Lately Chair of Governors, York College. For services to Further Education. (York, North Yorkshire)
- Janette Collins. Founder, Crib Youth Intervention. For services to Reducing Re-offending. (London, Greater London)
- Lynda Morris Colston. Learning Design Manager, People and Capability Group, Department for Work and Pensions. For services to Mental Health Learning. (Leven, Fife)
- Jane Susan Comeau. Chair of the Board, Professional Association for Childcare and Early Years, Kent. For services to Education. (Tunbridge Wells, Kent)
- Eleanor Jill Constantine. Director, Arts Council Collection. For services to the Arts. (Sevenoaks, Kent)
- Jacqueline Nicola Copping. Deputy Director of Nursing, James Paget University Hospitals NHS. For services to Nursing, particularly during Covid-19. (Beccles, Suffolk)
- Evelyn Jane Corner. Physiotherapist and Lecturer, Brunel University. For services to Health Education during Covid-19. (London, Greater London)
- Gillian Coultard. For services to Football. (Castleford, West Yorkshire)
- Julie Coveney. Team Leader, Ministry of Defence. For services to Defence. (London, Greater London)
- Philip John Cowburn. Consultant in Emergency Medicine, South Western Ambulance Service NHS Foundation Trust and Great Western Air Ambulance. For services to Emergency Medicine and to the Covid-19 Response. (Stonehouse, Gloucestershire)
- Anita Olwen Creech. Regional Manager, Immigration Enforcement International, Home Office. For services to Border Security. (Abroad, Abroad)
- Bradley Jay Creswick. Lately Leader, Royal Northern Sinfonia. For services to Music. (Whitley Bay, Tyne and Wear)
- Susan Crocker. Consultant Clinical Psychologist, Head of Community Child and Adolescent Mental Health Service, City of London and London Borough of Hackney. For services to Children and Young People with Special Educational Needs and Disabilities. (London, Greater London)
- David William Courtie Crosby. Chair of the Corporation, Hugh Baird College, Bootle. For services to Further Education in Merseyside. (Wirral, Merseyside)
- Philip Roy Cross. Co-founder, Starcross Youth Theatre. For services to Young People in Wolverhampton. (Bilston, West Midlands)
- Major (Rtd) Robert John Cross. Chairman, North Midlands Branch, Gurkha Welfare Trust. For services to Gurkha Veterans. (Rugeley, Staffordshire)
- Elizabeth Jane Crump. National Strategic Lead, What Next? For services to the Arts. (London, Greater London)
- Sylvia May Cundell. Senior Crown Prosecutor, East of England, Crown Prosecution Service. For services to Law and Order. (Huntingdon, Cambridgeshire)
- Debra Curd. Leader, Social Work Services, Swindon Borough Council. For services to Children and to Young People. (Bracknell, Berkshire)
- Alan Thomas Curtis. For services to Welsh Football. (Swansea, West Glamorgan)
- Thomas Douglas Cuthbertson. Co-founder, Brothers in Arms. For services to Charitable Fundraising for the Armed Forces Charities. (Sunderland, Tyne and Wear)
- Carla Jane Cuthbertson. Co-founder, Brothers in Arms. For services to Charitable Fundraising for Armed Forces Charities. (Sunderland, Tyne and Wear)
- Caroline Anne Cutts. Operational Director, Children and Families, London Borough of Redbridge. For services to Children, to Young People and to Families. (Hullbridge, Essex)
- Simon Lewis Danciger. Chair, OSO Arts Centre. For services to the community in Barnes, Greater London, particularly during Covid-19. (London, Greater London)
- Leonard Arnold Daniels. For services to the community in Somerset. (Taunton, Somerset)
- Wayne Mark Darch. Head of Operations, Emergency Preparedness, Resilience, Response and Specialist Practice, South Western Ambulance Service NHS Foundation Trust. For services to the Emergency Services and to the Covid-19 Response. (Frome, Somerset)
- Craig Ashley David. Singer, Songwriter and Record Producer. For services to Music. (London, Greater London)
- Rachel Jacqueline Davis. Headteacher, Little Sutton School, West Midlands. For services to Education. (Sutton Coldfield, West Midlands)
- Pietra Marie De Mello-Pittman. Co-founder, Sisters Grimm. For services to International Trade and to the Creative Industry. (London, Greater London)
- Stephen Daniel De Silva. For services to Heritage. (St Albans, Hertfordshire)
- Tiger De Souza. Volunteering and Inclusion Director, National Trust. For services to Volunteering in the Not-For-Profit Sector, particularly during the Covid-19 Response. (Ipswich, Suffolk)
- Susan Anne Deaves. For services to Athletics. (Woking, Surrey)
- Jill Lisbeth Demilew. Lately Consultant Midwife, Public Health, Kings College Hospitals NHS Foundation Trust. For services to Midwifery. (London, Greater London)
- Fiona Claire Carlyon Dempsey. Consultant, Intensive Care Medicine and Anaesthesia, Somerset NHS Foundation Trust. For services to the NHS. (Taunton, Somerset)
- Karen Deverell. Chief Executive, Mendip YMCA. For services to Young People in Somerset. (Wells, Somerset)
- Linda Anne Diamond. Volunteer, Jewish Lads' and Girls' Brigade. For voluntary service to Young People. (London, Greater London)
- Robert Duncan Dick. Head Coach, Scottish Disability Bowls. For services to Disability Sport. (Cupar, Fife)
- Anna Louise Dixon. Chief Executive, Centre for Ageing Better. For services to Wellbeing in Later Life. (London, Greater London)
- Katherine Sian Dodd. For services to Hockey. (Langport, Somerset)
- Diane Dodsworth. Head of Nursing and Critical Care, Parkside Frimley Health NHS Foundation Trust. For services to Nursing, particularly during the Covid-19 response. (Hook, Hampshire)
- Carol Cecilia Doggett. Senior Matron, Intensive Care, Morriston Hospital, Swansea. For services to Leadership and Nursing Care for Intensive Care Patients and Staff, particularly during Covid-19. (Swansea, West Glamorgan)
- Gerard Francis Hilton Donnelly. Team Leader, People and Capability group, Apprenticeship team for services to Social Mobility. (Sunderland, Tyne and Wear)
- David Keay Dorward. Chairman, Dundee Bairns. For services to Children and Families in Dundee. (Broughty Ferry, Angus)
- Anne-Marie Douglas. Work Coach, Work and Health Services, South London District, Department for Work and Pensions. For services to Care Leavers in South London. (London, Greater London)
- Charles Wesley Duncan. For voluntary service to Military Veterans. (Newry, County Down)
- Itiola Durojaiye. Diversity Policy Adviser, Department for Business, Energy and Industrial Strategy. For services to Diversity. (Stanford-le-Hope, Essex)
- Avinash Dussaram. Members Services Officer, Parliamentary Digital Service. For services to Parliament, particularly during the Covid-19 Response. (London, Greater London)
- Sally Jane Dynevor. Actress. For services to Drama. (Altrincham, Greater Manchester)
- Philip Eaglen. Crew Member and Mechanic on the Offshore Boat, Wells Lifeboat Station. For services to the Royal National Lifeboat Institution. (Wells-next-the-Sea, Norfolk)
- David Roy Earle. Founder, Tribus. For voluntary and charitable services. (Banbury, Oxfordshire)
- Bethan Eaton-Haskins. Director, Quality and Chief Nurse, South East Coast Ambulance Service. For services to Nursing, particularly during Covid-19. (Sevenoaks, Kent)
- Matthew Ellison. Founder, Huntington's Disease Youth Organisation. For voluntary and charitable services. (Bedworth, Warwickshire)
- Tracy Helen Etienne. Family Legal Team Manager, Cheshire and Merseyside, H.M. Courts and Tribunals Service. For services to the Administration of Justice. (Tarporley, Cheshire)
- Emma Samantha Evans. For services to Goalball and to Athletes with Visual Impairments. (March, Cambridgeshire)
- Reverend David John Goronwy Evans. For services to Charity and to the community in Lampeter, West Wales. (Ceredigion, Dyfed)
- Pauline Evans. Senior Manager, National Crime Agency. For services to Law Enforcement. (Chelmsford, Essex)
- Diana Evans. For services to Heritage. (London, Greater London)
- David John Evans. Consultant Neonatologist, North Bristol NHS Trust. For services to Neonatology and Medical Education, particularly during Covid-19. (Bishopston, Bristol)
- Paul John Fenton. Director, Estates and Facilities, East Suffolk and North Essex NHS Foundation Trust. For services to the NHS. (Ipswich, Suffolk)
- Pauline Fielding. Founder, RoadPeace North West. For services to Road Safety. (Wirral, Merseyside)
- Charles David McQuistan Flear. For services to Health, to Community Care and to the community in Caithness. (Halkirk, Caithness)
- Lee Alexander Fletcher. Director of Extended Services, Tudor Grange Academy, Kingshurst. For services to Education in Birmingham. (Sutton Coldfield, West Midlands)
- Rosemary Fletcher. Volunteer. For voluntary service to the NHS Forth Valley Royal Hospital during Covid-19. (Stirling, Stirling and Falkirk)
- Karen Flood. Co-chair, Cross-Government National Learning Disability Board. For services to People with Learning Disabilities. (Liverpool, Merseyside)
- Ronald Flowers. For services to Football. (Stafford, Staffordshire)
- Courtney-Jayne Foley. Project Manager, PPE Procurement, Ministry of Defence. For services to Defence during the Covid-19 Response. (Malpas, Cheshire)
- James Michael Ford. Lately Foster Carer, Plymouth Fostering Services. For services to Fostering. (Plymouth, Devon)
- Valerie Teresa Ford. Lately Foster Carer, Plymouth Fostering Services. For services to Fostering. (Plymouth, Devon)
- Evelyn Helen Forde. Headteacher, Copthall School, Mill Hill. For services to Education in the London Borough of Barnet. (London, Greater London)
- Denzil Forrester. Artist. For services to Art. (London, Greater London)
- Jonathan Freeman. For charitable services. (Redhill, Surrey)
- Mark Christopher Edward Freeman. President, Libraries Connected. For services to the Public Libraries Sector, particularly during the Covid-19 response. (Seaham, County Durham)
- June Patricia Freeman. Founder Member, Colchester Refuge. For services to the Women's Refuge Movement in Colchester, Essex. (Colchester, Essex)
- Michael William Freer. Prison Officer, H.M. Prison Hull. For services to H.M. Prison and Probation Service. (Hull, East Riding of Yorkshire)
- Sally Gallagher. Technical Specialist, Environment Agency. For services to the Groundwater Environment and to the Protection of Communities. (Newcastle upon Tyne, Tyne and Wear)
- Ismail Mohammed Gangat. Founder and Proprietor, Azhar Academy Girls' School, Forest Gate. For services to Education in East London. (London, Greater London)
- Joseph Garcia. Director of Operations, South East Coast Ambulance Trust. For services to Emergency Response, particularly during the Covid-19 Response. (Lichfield, Staffordshire)
- Peter Mark Glover. Ambulance Technician, South East Coast Ambulance Service and Lead for Proactive Care, Farnham Integrated Care GP Services. For services to the NHS and to Healthcare in the community. (Frimley, Surrey)
- John Godden. Chief Executive Officer, Salutem Healthcare and Education. For services to the Vulnerable, particularly during the Covid-19 Response. (Tadworth, Surrey)
- Keith Malcolm Godfrey. Medical Doctor and Clinical Scientist, Professor of Epidemiology, University of Southampton. For services to Medicine during the Covid-19 Response. (Southampton, Hampshire)
- Derek Charles Goodwin. For services to the Study of Fish Populations in Cornwall. (Perranporth, Cornwall)
- James Russell Gouldie. Supply Chain Director for England, Scotland, Wales and Northern Ireland, Bidford. For services to the Vulnerable during the Covid-19 Response. (Winchester, Hampshire)
- Roganie Govender. Consultant Clinical Academic Speech and Language Therapist. For services to Speech and Language Therapy. (Hitchen, Hertfordshire)
- Anita Goyal. For services to Diversity and to Female Empowerment. (Brentwood, Essex)
- Paul Robert Grant. Molecular Virology Scientific and Research and Development Lead, Health Services Laboratories. For services to Healthcare Science during the Covid-19 Response. (Abbotts Langley, Hertfordshire)
- Jimmy Greaves. For services to Football. (Little Baddow, Essex)
- Jason Greenwood. Delivery Manager, Special Educational Needs and Disability Tribunal. For services to the Administration of Justice, particularly during the Covid-19 Response. (Redcar, North Yorkshire)
- Gary Grewal. UK Liaison Officer. For services to Defence. (London, Greater London)
- Ray Griffiths. For services to Mountain Rescue. (Penrith, Cumbria)
- Sarah Ellen Griffiths. For charitable services to People with Disabilities. (Enniskillen, County Fermanagh)
- Mohammad Tayyab Haider. Medical Director, Basildon and Thurrock University Hospitals NHS Foundation Trust. For services to the NHS, particularly during the Covid-19 Response and to the community in Essex. (Brentwood, Essex)
- Simon Mark Halden. Founder and Campaign Leader, Sarah Greene Breakthrough Tribute Fund. For services to Cancer Fundraising. (Hungerford, Berkshire)
- Caroline Halfhide. For services to the community in Martock, Somerset during the Covid-19 Response. (Martock, Somerset)
- Anna Louise Hallas. National Domestic Manager, Compass Group. For services to the NHS. (March, Cambridgeshire)
- Mohammad Imran Hamid. For services to Youth Empowerment and Social Welfare Projects. (London, Greater London)
- David Andrew Hamilton. Founder, Phoenix Dance Theatre. For services to Dance. (Leeds, West Yorkshire)
- Kevin Hammett. For services to Voluntary Fundraising. (Barnstaple, Devon)
- Katherine Elizabeth Ann Hancock. Special Chief Officer, Warwickshire Police Special Constabulary. For services to Policing. (Dunchurch, Warwickshire)
- Florence Margaret Hand. Health and Wellbeing Manager, Northern Health and Social Care Trust. For services to the Homeless. (Randalstown, County Antrim)
- Amir Simon Hannan. General Practitioner, Haughton Thornley Medical Centre. For services to General Practice in Hyde and Haughton Green, Metropolitan Borough of Tameside. (Altrincham, Greater Manchester)
- Richard Harling. Director, Health and Care, Staffordshire County Council. For services to Public Health and Adult Social Care, particularly during the Covid-19 Response. (Kidderminster, Worcestershire)
- Stewart Christopher Harris. Headteacher, Phoenix School for Autism, Language and Communication, Bow, London. For services to Children and Young People with Autism and to their Families. (London, Greater London)
- Robert Roden Harris. Volunteer, H.M. Coastguard. For services to Voluntary Search and Rescue. (Wadebridge, Cornwall)
- Paul Harrison. Clinical Director, Black Country Pathology Services. For services to Pathology in the West Midlands, particularly during the Covid-19 Response. (Stourbridge, West Midlands)
- Carol Ann Hart. Head of Volunteer and Community Services, Association of Jewish Refugees. For services to the Jewish community during Covid-19. (London, Greater London)
- Arthur David Harverd. Chairman, Enemy Property Claims Assessment Panel. For services to Arbitration. (London, Greater London)
- Ian Aubrey McDonald Harvey. For services to Agriculture and to Charity in Northern Ireland. (Ballynahinch, County Down)
- Nichola Hay. Chief Operating Officer, Estio Training and lately Director, Outsource Learning and Development. For services to Apprenticeships and to Charity. (Yateley, Hampshire)
- Rupert Michael Hay-Campbell. Head of Architecture, Parliamentary Digital Service. For services to Parliament and to the community in Essex. (Buckhurst Hill, Essex)
- Christine Hayes. Lately Systems, Analytics and Reward Officer, Ulster University. For services to Higher Education. (Rasharkin, County Antrim)
- Peter Nigel Heap. For charitable services to the community in Essex. (Manuden, Essex)
- Robert Heard. For services to the Arts and to Charitable Fundraising. (Watchet, Somerset)
- Mursal Hedayat. Founder, Chatterbox. For services to Social Enterprise, Technology and the Economy. (London, Greater London)
- Claire Henderson. Head of Department, Quality, Careers and International Development, South Eastern Regional College. For services to Further Education in Northern Ireland. (Lisburn, County Antrim)
- Emma Victoria Henderson. Co-founder, Project Wingman. For services to Charity during Covid-19. (Kinloss, Moray)
- Mercedes Jill Ursula Henning. Headteacher, Holy Trinity CofE Primary Academy, Cheverell. For services to Education in Wiltshire. (Edington, Wiltshire)
- Laura Josephine Henry. Managing Director, Laura Henry Consultancy. For services to Education. (London, Greater London)
- George Arthur Somers Hervey-Bathurst. Founder, Ben Bathurst Memorial Trust. For voluntary service to Armed Forces Personnel and to their Families. (Ledbury, Herefordshire)
- Katherine Hewlett. Glass Tutor, Working Men's College. For services to Further Education and to Charity in London. (London, Greater London)
- Janet Hills. Detective Sergeant, Metropolitan Police Service. For services to Policing and to Community Relations. (London, Greater London)
- Dorothy Anne Hilsley. Headteacher, Yester Primary School, Gifford. For services to Education in East Lothian. (Gullane, East Lothian)
- Timothy Boon Leong Ho. Medical Director, Frimley Health NHS Foundation Trust. For services to the NHS during Covid-19. (London, Greater London)
- Joanne Elizabeth Hobbs. Chief Executive Officer, British Youth Council. For professional and voluntary services to Young People. (London, Greater London)
- Patricia Holland. For services to the community in Buxton and High Peak, Derbyshire. (Buxton, Derbyshire)
- Emily Jayne Hollis. For services to Education in the London Borough of Croydon. (London, Greater London)
- Stephen Holmes. Service Director, Adult Social Care, Northumberland County Council. For services to Adult Social Care during Covid-19. (Corbridge, Northumberland)
- Sarah Elizabeth Hope. Founder, Elizabeth's Legacy of Hope. For services to Child Amputees and Road Crash Victims in London. (Harpenden, Hertfordshire)
- Damian Hopley. For services to Rugby Union Football. (London, Greater London)
- Hobibul Hoque. Chief Inspector, Bedfordshire Police. For services to Policing and Community Cohesion. (Luton, Bedfordshire)
- Sharon Howell. For charitable services in Hertfordshire. (Hertford, Hertfordshire)
- Derek Andrew Howland. Lately Principal Production Consultant, Ordnance Survey. For services to National Mapping. (Salisbury, Wiltshire)
- Jill Hudson-Clark. Foster Carer, Royal Borough of Windsor and Maidenhead. For services to Fostering in Berkshire. (Maidenhead, Berkshire)
- William Joseph Humphrey MLA. Member of the Northern Ireland Legislative Assembly for North Belfast. For public service, particularly during the Covid-19 Response. (Belfast)
- Andrew John Hurst. Chief Executive, One Dance UK. For services to Dance, particularly during the Covid-19 Response. (Leamington Spa, Warwickshire)
- Teresa Ann Hurst. For political service in St Helen's, Merseyside. (St Helens, Merseyside)
- Gareth Hynes. Specialty Registrar, Respiratory Medicine, Oxford University Hospitals NHS Foundation Trust. For services to Medical Education during Covid-19. (Oxford, Oxfordshire)
- Olayinka Ilori. Designer. For services to Design. (London, Greater London)
- Kevin Robert Ingram. For charitable and voluntary services in Solihull, West Midlands. (Kingswinford, West Midlands)
- Catherine Jane Irwin. Volunteer, Girl Guides. For services to Girlguiding. (Enniskillen, County Fermanagh)
- Syeda Islam. For services to the community in Battersea, Greater London particularly during the Covid-19 Response. (London, Greater London)
- Moinul Islam. Founder and Project Manager, Outta Skool North West. For services to Sport and Education in the community, particularly during the Covid-19 Response. (Oldham, Greater Manchester)
- Richard Nicholas Gildart Jackson. Lately Head of Operations and Regional Media, Conservative Party. For public and political service. (London, Greater London)
- Rodney Cyril James. Foster Carer, Oxfordshire County Council. For services to Fostering. (Abingdon, Oxfordshire)
- Rosalie Olive James. Foster Carer, Oxfordshire County Council. For services to Fostering. (Abingdon, Oxfordshire)
- Fiona Charlton Jenkins. Executive Director of Therapies and Health Sciences, Cardiff and Vale University Health Board and Interim Executive Director of Therapies and Health Sciences, Cwm Taf Morgannwg University Health Board. For services to Healthcare. (Cardiff, South Glamorgan)
- Mary Gabrielle Jennings. Chief Executive Officer, FoodCycle. For professional and voluntary services to Disadvantaged People. (London, Greater London)
- Michelle Johnson. Chief Nurse, Whittington Health NHS Trust. For services to Nursing, particularly during the Covid-19 Response. (St Albans, Hertfordshire)
- Robert Cameron Johnston. Regional Director, Duke of Edinburgh's Award. For services to Young People. (Liverpool, Merseyside)
- Shravan Jashvantrai Joshi. For services to Diversity and to the British Hindu community. (London, Greater London)
- Shikandhini Kanagasundrem. Director, Infection Prevention and Control and Consultant Microbiologist, The Princess Alexandra Hospital NHS Trust. For services to Microbiology, infection Prevention and Control, particularly during the Covid-19 Response. (Loughton, Essex)
- Harjinder Kaur Kandola. Chief Executive, Barnet, Enfield and Haringey Mental Health NHS Trust. For services to Mental Health, particularly during the Covid-19 Response. (Arlesey, Bedfordshire)
- Declan Michael Kavanagh. For services to the Vulnerable during the Covid-19 Response. (Crick, Northamptonshire)
- Maria Keaveney-Jessiman. Principal, Eveline Nursery Chain and Eveline Day School, London. For services to Education. (London, Greater London)
- Ryan Lawrence Kelley. Chief Executive, Whitmore Vale Housing Association. For services to Social Care in Surrey. (Godalming, Surrey)
- Carmen June Kelly. Member of Management Committee, Cruse Bereavement Care. For services to Bereaved People in Hertfordshire. (Stevenage, Hertfordshire)
- Anne Viensouk Keothavong Bretherton. For services to Tennis. (London, Greater London)
- John Kiely. For services to the community in Coventry. (Wixford, Warwickshire)
- Laura Jane King. Founder, John King Brain Tumour Foundation. For charitable and voluntary services to People with Brain Tumours. (Walton-on-Thames, Surrey)
- Sarah Margaret Kingsland. Senior Clinical Quality Manager, Regional Infection Prevention and Control Lead, NHS England and NHS Improvement, London Region. For services to the NHS, particularly during the Covid-19 Response. (Cambridge, Cambridgeshire)
- John Michael Kirkpatrick. For services to Folk Music. (Bishop's Castle, Shropshire)
- Brian Douglas Knight. For services to the community in Bognor Regis and Littlehampton, West Sussex. (Bognor Regis, West Sussex)
- Lisa Elizabeth Knight. Chief Nurse, London North West University Healthcare NHS Trust. For services to Nursing during Covid-19. (Tring, Hertfordshire)
- Stuart Howard Lamb. Chairman, William Lamb Group. For services to Business, to Skills and to the community in Yorkshire. (Wakefield, West Yorkshire)
- Steven Mark Langley. Project Delivery Manager, Digital Group, Department for Work and Pensions. For services to Disability Accessibility Improvement and to Charity. (Blackpool, Lancashire)
- Alan Brian Lazarus. Co-founder, Secretary and current President, Jewish Association for Mental Illness. For services to Mental Health in the Jewish Community. (London, Greater London)
- Kim Leadbeater. Ambassador, Jo Cox Foundation and Chair, More in Common Batley and Spen. For services to Social Cohesion, to the community in Batley, West Yorkshire and to Combatting Loneliness during Covid-19. (Liversedge, West Yorkshire)
- Janet Olwen Lear. Founder and Headteacher, Black Country Wheels School, Stourbridge. For services to Education in the West Midlands. (Halesowen, West Midlands)
- Richard Royce Lee QAM. Strategic Commander, St John Ambulance. For services to Healthcare during Covid-19. (Caerphilly, Gwent)
- Maria Bernice Lenn. Founder and Chief Executive Officer, The Suited & Booted Centre. For services to Unemployed in London. (London, Greater London)
- Kim Lewington. Charity Development Programme, Fly2Help. For services to Diversity in Aviation. (Gloucester, Gloucestershire)
- Simon Philip Lewis. Head of Crisis Response, British Red Cross. For services to UK Crisis Response and to Healthcare, particularly during Covid-19. (Bushey, Hertfordshire)
- Ann Lovelace. Volunteer, the Orpheus Centre. For services to Young People with Disabilities in Godstone, Surrey. (Tatsfield, Surrey)
- Ronald Alexander Loveland. For services to Foster Care in Moray. (Fochabers, Moray)
- Joyce Margaret Loveland. For services to Foster Care in Moray. (Fochabers, Moray)
- Susanne Lynch. Head, Medicines Management, South Sefton Clinical Commissioning Group and Southport and Formby Clinical Commissioning Group. For services to Pharmacy, particularly during the Covid-19 Response. (Liverpool, Merseyside)
- Kenneth Neil MacDonald. For voluntary service to Dentistry and Dental Training Abroad. (Isle of Lewis, Western Isles)
- Natalie-Jane Anne MacDonald. Chief Executive Officer, Sunrise Senior Living UK and Gracewell Healthcare and Chair, Nuffield Health. For services to Healthcare, particularly during the Covid-19 Response. (Ickford, Buckinghamshire)
- Judith Martha Tsitsi Machiwenyika. Nurse Consultant, Royal Papworth Hospital NHS Foundation Trust. For services to Nursing and to BAME Equality, particularly during the Covid-19 Response. (Huntingdon, Cambridgeshire)
- Kenneth MacKay. For services to the community in Rhenigidale, Western Isles. (Isle of Harris, Western Isles)
- David James Mahoney. Chief Operating Officer, England and Wales Cricket Board. For services to Sport. (London, Greater London)
- Veronica Main. For services to Straw Hat Plaiting and Endangered Crafts Skills. (Hazlemere, Buckinghamshire)
- Abdul Majid. For services to Integration in Glasgow and to Charity in Scotland and Abroad. (Bothwell, Glasgow)
- Martin Paul Mann. Chair, Special Olympics. For services to People with Intellectual Disabilities. (Ipswich, Suffolk)
- Raymond Alfred Stradling Marsh. For voluntary service to Wildlife and Conservation on Skippers Island, Essex. (Walton-on-the-Naze, Essex)
- Alan Roger Maryon-Davis. Chair, Public Health Advisory Group, National Institute for Health and Care Excellence. For services to Public Health. (Tilsbury, Wiltshire)
- Fiorella Massey. Chair, Friends of the Mental Health Foundation. For services to Education. (London, Greater London)
- Michael Humphrey Harcourt Master. For services to Wildlife and Conservation in Hertfordshire and Middlesex. (Royston, Hertfordshire)
- Robert Keith Mather. Founder and Chief Executive Officer, Against Malaria Foundation. For services to Medicine and to Charity. (London, Greater London)
- Alexander John Hilton Mayfield. Supply Chain and Operations Director, Brakes. For services to the Food Supply Chain and to the Vulnerable during the Covid-19 Response. (York, North Yorkshire)
- Duncan Ferguson McDonald. For services to Scottish Traditional Music. (Acharacle, Argyll and Bute)
- Karen McDowell. Station Commander, Northern Ireland Fire and Rescue Service. For services to the Northern Ireland Fire and Rescue Service and to the LGBTQ community. (Dromore, County Down)
- John Charles Kenneth McDowell. Director, Kilwaughter Minerals Ltd. For services to Industry and to Charity in Northern Ireland. (Whitehead, County Antrim)
- William Thompson McElhinney. Lately Principal, Ashlea Primary School, Derry. For services to Primary Education in Northern Ireland. (Derry)
- David Alistair McGowan. For services to Sport and to Reconciliation in Northern Ireland. (Magherafelt, County Londonderry)
- Alyson McGregor. National Director, Altogether Better. For services to Collaborative Practice and Service Development in the NHS. (Keighley, West Yorkshire)
- John Warren McGuinness. For services to Motorcycle Racing. (Lancaster, Lancashire)
- Helen Elizabeth McHugh. For services to Education and to the Methodist Church in Northern Ireland. (Belfast)
- Brenda Margaret McHugh. Founder, Pears Family School. For services to Education. (London, Greater London)
- George Philip McKenzie. Chair, Port William Inshore Rescue Service. For services to Maritime Safety in Scotland. (Newton Stewart, Dumfries and Galloway)
- Darren McMahon. Youth Worker, PACT. For voluntary service to Young People in Stanley, County Durham. (Stanley, County Durham)
- Amanda McNamee. Principal, Lagan College. For services to Education in Northern Ireland. (Belfast)
- Nigel William Whiteley Mellor. Chair, Emmaus Merseyside. For services to the Homeless and Disadvantaged in Merseyside. (Wirral, Merseyside)
- Greta Mendez. For services to Dance. (London, Greater London)
- Suzanne Elizabeth Miell-Ingram. Makaton Tutor and Director, Singing Hands. For services to Children and Young People with Special Educational Needs and Disabilities. (London, Greater London)
- Maxwell John Milburn. For services to Fundraising, especially for St Nicholas Hospice, Bury St Edmunds, Suffolk. (Bury St Edmunds, Suffolk)
- Andrew James Miller. Arts Consultant and Broadcaster. For services to Disability Awareness in the Cultural Industry. (Welford, Northamptonshire)
- Paul Malcolm Miller. Senior Manager Health, Safety and Environment, ASDA Stores Ltd. For services to Retail Customers during the Covid-19 Response. (East Kilbride, Lanarkshire)
- Liz Jane Mills. For services to the community in Market Harborough, Leicestershire, particularly during the Covid-19 Response. (Glen Parva, Leicestershire)
- Alexandra Gail Milne. Staff Commander, First Aid Nursing Yeomanry. For services to Emergency Incident Response and to the Covid-19 Response in London. (Baldock, Hertfordshire)
- Alison Anne Monaghan. Principal Geologist, British Geological Survey. For services to Geology. (Edinburgh)
- Harold Moore. Voluntary Founder and Chair, Rainbows Hospice for Children and Young People and Co-founder, the Laura Centre. For services to Young People and to Charity in Leicester. (Lutterworth, Leicestershire)
- Janet Enid Morgan. Founder, Lithuanian Orphans Support Trust. For voluntary and charitable services. (London, Greater London)
- Emma Margaret Morris. Chief Executive Officer, Stop Abuse For Everyone. For services to Victims of Abuse and to Charity. (West Hill, Devon)
- Paul Jonathan Morris. Founder and Chief Executive Officer, Addmaster UK Ltd. For services to Exports. (Rugeley, Staffordshire)
- Arpal Morzaria. Attendance and Wellbeing Champion, Risk and Intelligence Service, H.M. Revenue and Customs. For services to Staff Wellbeing. (Rickmansworth, Hertfordshire)
- Hamid Motraghi. Lately Chair, Home Office Race Network and Chair, Civil Service Race Forum. For services to Diversity and Inclusion. (Newcastle upon Tyne, Tyne and Wear)
- Dorota Anna Mroz. Editor and Digital Publishing Director, TES. For services to Education. (London, Greater London)
- Carol Ann Musgrave. Lately Manager, North Warwickshire Citizens' Advice. For services to the Voluntary Sector and to the community in Warwickshire. (Nuneaton, Warwickshire)
- Ruchi Nanda. Lately Account Manager, Department for International Trade. For services to Trade, to Investment and to Business Support. (Hockley, Essex)
- Gary Neeve. Officer, Border Force, Home Office. For services to Border Security. (Deal, Kent)
- Yvonne Newbold. Founder, Special Educational Needs and Disabilities, Violent and Challenging Behaviour Project. For services to Children with Special Educational Needs and Disabilities and to their Families. (London, Greater London)*
- Janice Nicholson. Strategic Lead, No Wrong Door, North Yorkshire. For services to Children. (Otley, West Yorkshire)
- Ashley Nicholson. President, UK Harbour Masters Association, and Senior Harbour Master, Forthports ltd. For services to Women in the Maritime Sector. (Larbert, Stirling and Falkirk)
- Khairun Nisa. Foster Carer, Leeds City Council. For services to Fostering. (Pudsey, West Yorkshire)
- Eunice Margery Norman. For services to the community in Gillingham, Kent. (Gillingham, Kent)
- Justine Patricia Norris. Community Mental Health Occupational Therapist, Kent and Medway NHS and Social Care Partnership Trust. For services to the NHS during Covid-19. (Deal, Kent)
- Laura Jane Norris. Head of Strategy and Policy for Specialised Services, NHS England and NHS Improvement. For services to the NHS during Covid-19. (Ilkley, West Yorkshire)
- Karen Lesley O'Brien. Regional Chief Pharmacist and Controlled Drug Accountable Officer, NHS England and NHS Improvement, North West Region. For services to Pharmacy and Patient Safety, particularly during the Covid-19 Response. (Salford, Greater Manchester)
- Alan James Oddie. Founder, Ride High. For services to the community in Milton Keynes. (Aspley Guise, Bedfordshire)
- Michael John O'Neill. Chairman, Keighley Cougars. For services to Rugby League Football, the community in Keighley, West Yorkshire and to Charity during the Covid-19 Pandemic. (London, Greater London)
- Richard William Ord. For services to Hospitality and Regeneration in South Tyneside. (Whitburn, Tyne and Wear)
- Richard Hugh Osgood. Senior Archaeologist, Defence Infrastructure Organisation. For services to Defence and to Heritage. (Winchester, Hampshire)
- Mohamed Hazrath Haleem Ossman. For services to the Sri Lankan Community in the UK. (London, Greater London)
- Mark Anthony Owen. Special Chief Officer, North Wales Police. For services to Policing and to the community in North Wales, particularly during the Covid-19 Response. (Llanynys, Clwyd)
- Thomas Huw Owen. Founder and Managing Director, Owens Group. For services to Employment and to the community in Llanelli and South Wales. (Llanelli, Dyfed)
- David Fraser Owen. For services to Scouting. (Hereford, Herefordshire)
- Amanda Elizabeth Lavinia Owen. Health and Safety Director, Heathrow Airport. For services to Transport, particularly during the Covid-19 Response. (Virginia Water, Surrey)
- Daniel Leonard Owens. Online Grocery Development Manager, Asda Stores Ltd. For services to Retail Customers during the Covid-19 Response. (Bingley, West Yorkshire)
- Susan Dorothy Owen-Weaver. Founder, Change of Scene. For voluntary service to Disadvantaged Young People in Surrey and Hampshire. (Farnham, Surrey)
- Catherine Julie Palmer. Head, Change Governance, Driver and Vehicle Licensing Agency. For services to Motorists. (Swansea, West Glamorgan)
- Satyesh Parmar. Consultant Surgeon, Queen Elizabeth Hospital, Birmingham. For services to Oral and Maxillofacial Cancer Surgery. (Solihull, West Midlands)
- Richard Paskell. Western Beacons Mountain Rescue Team. For services to Mountain Rescue and to the community in South Wales. (Pontyclun, Mid Glamorgan)
- Catherine Paterson. Founder, the Dochas Fund. For services to Healthcare and Social Care in Argyll and Bute. (Lochgilphead, Argyll and Bute)
- Bhaven Pathak. For services to Business and British Hinduism. (London, Greater London)
- Jade-Shannon Patrick. Founder, Daisy Chain Project, Sussex. For services to Victims of Domestic Abuse, particularly during the Covid-19 Response. (Worthing, West Sussex)
- Harold George Patten. For services to African and Caribbean Dance. (London, Greater London)
- Nigel Lindsay Payne. Lately Chair, Professional Jockeys Association. For services to British Horseracing and to Charity, particularly during the Covid-19 Response. (Launceston, Cornwall)
- Ian Fryer Peake. Principal and Chief Executive, Herefordshire, Ludlow and North Shropshire College. For services to Education. (Sutton St. Nicholas, Herefordshire)
- David Frederick Pearson. Lately Trustee and Company Secretary and Founder, Thirtyone:eight. For services to Safeguarding the Vulnerable. (Swanley, Kent)
- Christine Marie Pearson. Executive Director of Nursing, East Lancashire Hospitals NHS Trust. For services to Nursing, particularly during the Covid-19 Response. (Manchester, Greater Manchester)
- Patricia Jane Roughan Pease. Associate Chief Nurse for Safeguarding, Mental Health and Learning Disabilities. For services to Nursing, Children, Young People and Safeguarding particularly during the Covid-19 Response. (Farnborough, Hampshire)
- Gordon Charles Penrose. Honorary President, Institute of Roofing. For services to the Roof Slating and Tiling Industry. (Carrickfergus, County Antrim)
- Christopher George Phillips. Voluntary Pastoral Worker, Dame Agnes Weston's Royal Charity for the Naval Service. For voluntary service to the Royal Navy. (Ivybridge, Devon)
- Tamsin Phipps. For voluntary services to Waterways and to Young People through Girlguiding UK. (Wargrave, Berkshire)
- Martin George Pilgrim. Trustee and Treasurer, Young Women's Trust. For services to Disadvantaged Children and Young People. (Canterbury, Kent)
- Mark Craig Pilkington. Combat System Engineer, Defence, Equipment and Support, Ministry of Defence. For services to Naval Operational Capability. (Langport, Somerset)
- Heather Pope. Clinical Director for Dental Services, East Cheshire NHS Trust. For services to Dental Treatment for the Vulnerable. (Winsford, Cheshire)
- Emmi Rose Poteliakhoff. Provider Policy Director, NHS England and NHS Improvement. For services to the NHS, particularly during the Covid-19 Response. (London, Greater London)
- Rachel Poulton. Foster Carer, York City Council. For services to Fostering, particularly during the Covid-19 Response. (York, North Yorkshire)
- Nigel Poulton. Foster Carer, York City Council. For services to Fostering, particularly during the Covid-19 Response. (York, North Yorkshire)
- Marilyn Ann Pound. Chair of Governors, Cardinal Wiseman Catholic School, Ealing, London. For services to Education. (London, Greater London)
- Christine Powell. National Manager, 111 Wales, Welsh Ambulance Service. For services to Healthcare and to the 111 Service in Wales. (Bridgend, Mid Glamorgan)
- Bruce Lewis Hamilton Powell. Lately Chair of Trustees, Haberdashers' Aske's Federation and Treloar Trust. For services to Education. (Bentley, Hampshire)
- Nigel Jonathan Priestley. Solicitor. For services to Children and to Families. (Huddersfield, West Yorkshire)
- Jo-Ann Elizabeth Prichard Pringle. Programme Adviser, Childcare Works Leeds. For services to Children and Families. (Leeds, West Yorkshire)
- Mohanned Saleem Udin Kauser Quazi. Team Leader, Office of the Regional Schools Commissioner, West Midlands. For services to Education. (Epsom, Surrey)
- Tim Ramsey. Founder, Just Like Us. For services to Education and to LGBTQ Equality. (London, Greater London)
- Alastair John Rankin. For public and charitable services in Belfast. (Lisburn, County Antrim)
- Robert Kilpatrick Rankin. Project Manager, Watt's Improved Safety Headguard. For services to Civil Engineering and to Innovation. (Glasgow, Glasgow)
- David MacCauley Reid. Volunteer Ambassador, Royal Osteoporosis Society. For services to People with Osteoporosis and to Charity. (Cults, City of Aberdeen)
- Judith Stella Rhys. For voluntary service to Health and Social Care. (Cardiff, South Glamorgan)
- Sharron Robbie. Managing Director, Devon and Cornwall Training Providers Network. For services to Apprenticeships and to Skills. (Plymouth, Devon)
- Margaret Grace Roberts. External Examiner and President, Institute of Education and Geographical Association. For services to Education. (Sheffield, South Yorkshire)
- Catherine Robertson. Consultant Professor, University of Nottingham. For services to Occupational Therapy. (Nottingham, Nottinghamshire)
- Thomas Daniel Robinson. For voluntary service to Education in Larne, County Antrim. (Larne, County Antrim)
- David John Marshall Robinson. Chairman of the Trustees, The Robinson Memorial Hospital. For services to the Health Board and the Covid-19 Response in North Antrim. (Ballymena, County Antrim)
- Robert Andrew Robinson. For public and voluntary service in Powys. (Welshpool, Powys)
- Simone Monique Roden. Headteacher, Ynysowen Community Primary School. For services to Education in Aberfan, Merthyr Tydfil. (Ebbw Vale, Gwent)
- Marilyn Rogers. Midwife, Calderdale and Huddersfield NHS Foundation Trust and Founder, Calderdale Baby Cafe. For services to Midwifery and Infant Feeding. (Huddersfield, West Yorkshire)
- John Romain. Co-founder, The NHS Spitfire Project. For services to Charity and to Aircraft Restoration, particularly during the Covid-19 Response. (Saffron Walden, Essex)
- Amanda Romain. Co-founder, The NHS Spitfire Project. For services to Charity and to Aircraft Restoration, particularly during the Covid-19 Response. (Saffron Walden, Essex)
- Timothy Robert Root. Assistant Head, NHS Specialist Pharmacy Service. For services to Pharmacy, particularly during the Covid-19 Response. (London, Greater London)
- Gloria Rowland. Director of Midwifery, Barts Health NHS Trust. For professional and voluntary services to Midwifery. (Hatfield, Hertfordshire)
- George Philip Page Royle. Head of Delivery, Customs Handling of Import and Export Freight, H.M. Revenue and Customs. For public service. (Wokingham, Berkshire)
- Vinaykant Ruparelia DL. For services to Local Enterprise, to Tourism and to the community in Portsoy, Banffshire. (Portsoy, Banffshire)
- Jon Antony Sass. For services to the Restoration of UK Windmills and Watermills. (Market Rasen, Lincolnshire)
- Ruth Saunders. For services to charity during Covid-19. (Newbury, Berkshire)
- Andrew John Savage. Executive Director, Rail Heritage Trust. For services to the Railway Industry and Heritage. (London, Greater London)
- Joy Louise Scott. Volunteer, MENCAP. For services to People with Special Educational Needs and Disabilities in Northampton. (Abington, Northamptonshire)
- Deborah Patricia Scully. Deputy Principal, Royal Central School of Speech and Drama. For services to Drama Training and to Higher Education. (London, Greater London)
- Victoria Sellick. Chief Partnership Officer, Nesta. For services to Social Action. (Farnham, Surrey)
- Richard James Sercombe. Data Technologist, Brakes. For services to Vulnerable People during the Covid-19 Response. (Whitworth, Lancashire)
- Niraj Kumar Sharma. Immigration Liaison Officer, Immigration Enforcement, Home Office. For public service. (Abroad, Abroad)
- Andrew Shelley. Lately Chief Executive, World Squash Federation. For services to Squash. (London, Greater London)
- Lorraine Sherr. Professor of Clinical and Health Psychology, UCL, London. For services to Vulnerable Children and to Families. (London, Greater London)
- Marie Shevas. For services to Charity in Cowdenbeath and Malawi. (Ketly, Fife)
- Chris Shirling-Rooke. Chief Executive Officer, Mersey Maritime. For services to the Maritime Sector. (Heswall, Merseyside)
- Joe Simmonds. Captain, Exeter Chiefs. For services to Rugby Union Football. (Exeter, Devon)
- Margaret Ann Simmons-Bird. Director of Education Transformation, Bath and North East Somerset Council. For services to Education. (Bristol)
- Cheryl Jane Simpson. Co-founder and Chief Executive, Space4autism. For services to the Community and to Autism. (Poynton, Cheshire)
- Sunita Ben Singal. Diversity and Equality Lead, National Employer and Partnership Team, Department for Work and Pensions. For services to Diversity and to Inclusion. (Sutton Coldfield, West Midlands)
- Mark Christopher Siswick. Executive Headteacher, Chesterton Primary School, London. For services to Education. (London, Greater London)
- Councillor David John Skinner. For services to the community in Coventry, West Midlands. (Coventry, West Midlands)
- John Robert Sleep. Senior Officer, VAT Technical Consultant, H.M. Revenue and Customs. For services to Tax Compliance. (Rochdale, Greater Manchester)
- Lynn Elizabeth Sloman. Founder, Transport for Quality of Life. For services to Transport. (Ceredigion, Dyfed)
- Jean Shirley Smart. Director, Collin Care Group and Head, Mayfield Nursery, Glasgow. For services to Pre-School Education and to Charity. (Largs, Ayrshire)
- Alison Smith. Treasurer, SOS Rape Crisis, Southend on Sea. For services to Victims of Domestic and Sexual Violence in Essex. (Westcliff-on-Sea, Essex)
- Christopher Scott Smith. Facilities Manager, Department for Digital, Culture, Media and Sport. For public service, particularly during the Covid-19 Response. (Caterham, Surrey)
- Lynn Smith. Civilian Secretary, HQ 38 (Irish) Brigade, Northern Ireland Garrison. For services to Defence. (Lisburn, County Antrim)
- Colin Smith. For services to Charitable Fundraising in Dover, Kent. (Dover, Kent)
- Joanna Angelina Helen Snow. Matron, Intensive Care Unit, Kettering General Hospital. For services to the NHS and Patients, particularly during the Covid-19 Response. (Leicester, Leicestershire)
- Hora Soltani-Karbaschi. Professor of Maternal and Infant Health, Sheffield Hallam University. For services to Higher Education and to Maternal and Infant Health. (Sheffield, South Yorkshire)
- David Somerville. Team Leader, Ministry of Defence. For services to Defence. (London, Greater London)
- Nicholas Peter Speight. HR Leader, The Co-operative Group. For services to the Food Supply Chain during Covid-19. (Sale, Greater Manchester)
- Katie Elizabeth Spencer. Senior Manager, Lloyds Banking Group. For services to the Financial Services Sector during Covid-19. (Wigan, Greater Manchester)
- Ella Louvaine Spira. Co-founder, Sisters Grimm. For services to International Trade and the Creative Industry. (London, Greater London)
- Sasi Srinivasan. Early Years Manager, London Borough of Brent. For services to Education. (London, Greater London)
- Frederick Giovanni Maria St George. Co-founder, the Italian Job. For services to Charity. (Steyning, West Sussex)
- Gillian Penelope Stamp. For public and voluntary service. (London, Greater London)
- John Michael Stevenson. For Charitable Fundraising for Cancer Charities. (Alderley Edge, Cheshire)
- Rosemary Bernadertte Stewart. Senior Private Secretary to the First Minister of Wales. For public service. (Cardiff, South Glamorgan)
- David Charles Stewart. Regional Director, Health Library and Knowledge Services North, Health Education England. For services to the NHS and voluntary service to Information Management. (Warrington, Cheshire)
- Peter James Stratten. Chief Executive Officer, British Gliding Association. For services to Aviation. (Brackley, Northamptonshire)
- Chitra Sundaram. For services to the South Asian Dance Sector. (London, Greater London)
- Fiona Helen Turnbull Symon. For services to Maritime Heritage. (Kinross, Perth and Kinross)
- Tamas Szakmany. Critical Care Consultant, Royal Gwent Hospital. For services to the NHS during Covid-19. (Newport, Gwent)
- Andrew Stuart Taee. For charitable fundraising for Great Ormond Street Hospital for Children NHS Foundation Trust. (Egham, Surrey)
- Alexander Robert Taylor. Assistant Director, Readiness and Response, Civil Contingencies Secretariat, Cabinet Office. For public service. (Tunbridge Wells, Kent)
- Zoe Alison Taylor. Chief Executive Officer, Sparkol. For services to Exports. (Wraxall, Bristol)
- Peter Jason Taylor. For services to the Jewellery and Silversmithing Industries. (Birmingham, West Midlands)
- Darren Kenneth Teale. Founder, Junction 15 Productions. For services to Media and to Vulnerable Communities in the UK and Abroad. (Newcastle-Under-Lyme, Staffordshire)
- Stella Winifred Thebridge. Principal Librarian, Schools and Reading, Warwickshire. For services to Public Libraries during Covid-19. (Sutton Coldfield, West Midlands)
- Christopher Baden Nigel Thomas. Deputy Director, H.M. Coastguard. For services to Voluntary Search and Rescue. (Bournemouth, Dorset)
- David Thompson QPM. For services to Architecture and to the community in Norfolk. (Norwich, Norfolk)
- Asha Thomson. Speciality Dentist in Oral and Maxillofacial Surgery, Senior Clinical Leadership Fellow East Anglia NHS England and Senior Clinical Teacher in Oral Surgery, Kings College Hospital London. For services to the NHS, particularly during the Covid-19 Response. (Chelmsford, Essex)
- Paul Joseph Thorogood. Chief Executive Officer, Football Foundation. For services to Football. (London, Greater London)
- Claire Louise Throssell. For services to Children Experiencing Domestic Abuse. (Sheffield, South Yorkshire)
- Joanne Elizabeth Thwaite. Senior Scientist, Microbiology, Defence Science and Technology Laboratory. For services to the NHS during the Covid-19 Response. (Warminster, Wiltshire)
- Raphaela Thynne. Co-ordinator, Same Sex Marriage and Abortion Consultations, Northern Ireland Office. For services to Equality in Northern Ireland. (London, Greater London)
- Carol Susan Tiley. South West Area Chairman, Sea Cadets. For voluntary service to Young People. (Tewkesbury, Gloucestershire)
- Susan Tipton. Managing Director, Protocol Consultancy Services. For services to Apprenticeships and to Charity in the West Midlands. (Tamworth, Staffordshire)
- Anjuu Trevedi. Head, Regional Business Engagement, University of Leicester. For services to Business Innovation and to the Economy in Leicestershire. (Leicester, Leicestershire)
- Nigel John Tringham. Lately Editor, Victoria County History of Staffordshire. For services to Local History. (Stafford, Staffordshire)
- James David Trott. Founder and volunteer, Brass for Africa. For services to Disadvantaged Children and Young People in Liberia, Rwanda and Uganda. (Wokingham, Berkshire)
- Stephen James Trowbridge. Managing Director, First City Nursing and Care. For services to Domiciliary Care during Covid-19. (Swindon, Wiltshire)
- Catherine Tuitt. For services to the community in London. (London, Greater London)
- Rajinder Tumber. Cyber Security Executive, Ernst and Young. For services to the Cyber Security Industry. (London, Greater London)
- Stephanie Joy Tyler. For services to Nature Conservation in the UK and Africa. (Penallt, Gwent)
- Shahab Uddin. Director of Legal, British Olympic Association. For services to Sport during the Covid-19 Response. (London, Greater London)
- Barry George Underwood. Lately Head of Distribution Services, Vote Office, House of Commons. For services to Parliament, particularly during the Covid-19 Response and voluntary service to Football. (Ash Vale, Surrey)
- Tracy Gale Upton. Makaton Tutor, Singing Hands. For services to Children and Young People with Special Educational Needs and Disabilities. (London, Greater London)
- Manoj Varsani. Founder, SOS Supplies. For services to Protective Care during the Covid-19 Response. (London, Greater London)
- Kelly Ann Vere. Director of Technical Skills and Strategy, University of Nottingham. For services to Higher Education. (Draycott, Derbyshire)
- Mark Andrew Vickers. Chief Executive, Olive Academies. For services to Children and Young People with Special Educational Needs and Disabilities. (Brighton, East Sussex)
- Felicity Ann Waggett. For services to Young People and to the community in Gloucestershire. (Stroud, Gloucestershire)
- Claire Waldrom. Deputy Headteacher, Rosehill School, Nottingham. For services to Children and Young People with Special Educational Needs and Disabilities. (Nottingham, Nottinghamshire)
- Brendan Alan Warburton. Head Coach, Sheffield City Amateur Boxing Club. For services to Boxing and to the community in Sharrow, Sheffield. (Sheffield, South Yorkshire)
- Sarah Elizabeth Marilyn Warren. Lecturer, Southern Regional College. For services to Education and Children in Northern Ireland. (Tandragee, County Armagh)
- Diana Ruth Wastenage. For services to Agriculture. (Salterton, Devon)
- David Karl Waters. For services to Wildlife Conservation and to the Re-Introduction of Rare Native Species to the UK. (Salisbury, Wiltshire)
- Sharon Monica Watson DL. Lately Artistic Director, Phoenix Dance Theatre, Chief Executive and Principal, Northern School of Contemporary Dance. For services to Dance. (Leeds, West Yorkshire)
- Alexander Watt. Founder and Chairman, Glasgow Eagles Sports Charity Club. For services to Young People with Additional Needs and Disabilities and to Community Cohesion in Glasgow. (Glasgow, Glasgow)
- Samuel Webb. For services to Architecture. (Cambridge, Cambridgeshire)
- Stephen Leslie Weir. For services to the Royal British Legion and to the community in County Antrim during Covid-19. (Carrickfergus, County Antrim)
- Neil Weller. Chairman, London Apprenticeship Ambassador Network. For services to Education and to Skills. (Oxon, Oxfordshire)
- Karen Jay Wespieser. Chief Operations Officer, Parent Ping. For services to Children and Young People with Special Educational Needs and Disabilities, particularly during the Covid-19 Response. (Maidenhead, Berkshire)
- Joanne Wheeler. For services to the Arts and to People with Disabilities. (Harden, West Yorkshire)
- Michael James Whistler. Volunteer, Southend-on-Sea Lifeboat Station. For services to the Royal National Lifeboat Institution. (Southend-on-Sea, Essex)
- Kimberly Ann Wide. Chief Executive Officer, Take A Part Community Interest Company. For services to Social Engagement in the Arts in South West England. (Bristol)
- Heather Ann Williams. Consultant Medical Physicist for Nuclear Medicine, Christie NHS Foundation Trust. For services to Diversity and to Inclusion in Science. (Cheadle Hulme, Greater Manchester)
- Karen Hazel Williams. Foster Carer, Plymouth City Council. For services to Fostering. (Plymouth, Devon)
- Dean John Wilson JP. For public and voluntary service in South East London. (London, Greater London)
- Jacqueline Winning. Centre Manager, Forth Valley Sensory Centre. For services to People with Sensory Loss during the Covid-19 Response. (Falkirk, Stirling and Falkirk)
- Thomas Wood. Founder, Help 4 Homeless Veterans Charity. For charitable services during Covid-19. (Barnsley, South Yorkshire)
- Kelda Wood. Chief Executive Officer, Climbing Out. For charitable services. (Shrewsbury, Shropshire)
- Lindy Woodage. Staff Officer, Devon and Cornwall Police. For services to Policing and to Civil Contingency Planning, particularly during the Covid-19 Response. (Exmouth, Devon)
- Barbara Dorothy Worrall. Founder and Chair, Attention Deficit Hyperactivity Disorder (ADHD) North West. For services to Parents of Young People with ADHD. (Carnforth, Lancashire)
- Irvine Alan Worthington. Founder, Triangle of Care. For services to Mental Health Patients and their Carers. (Sidmouth, Devon)
- Glynis Wright. Founder and Head of Practice, Glynis Wright Ltd Solicitors. For services to Female Entrepreneurship. (Melton Mowbray, Leicestershire)
- Robert Wright. For services to Amateur Boxing and to Young People in Parson Cross, Sheffield. (Sheffield, South Yorkshire)
- Roland Edward Wycherley. Chairman, Shrewsbury Town Football Club. For services to the community in Shrewsbury. (Shrewsbury, Shropshire)
- Haleema Yousaf. Team Leader, Fair Access and School Exclusions, Sandwell Metropolitan Borough Council. For services to Children and Young People with Special Educational Needs and Disabilities. (Solihull, West Midlands)

=== Royal Red Cross ===
==== Members of the Royal Red Cross (RRC) ====
- Lieutenant Colonel Margaret Joyce Duffield, TD, VR, QARANC
- Colonel Geoffrey Staurt Hall
- Group Captain Michael John Preistly

==== Associate of the Royal Red Cross (ARRC) ====
- Lieutenant Commander Louise Carolyn Moxworthy
- Major Samantha Jayne Cobb
- Major Nicola Fiona Corkish
- Major Ami Alice Caroline Newburn-Johnson
- Staff Sergeant Emma Clarke
- Petty Officer Naval Nurse Andrew Cooper QARNNS, Emergency Medical Nurse, Joint Hospital Group South
- Lieutenant Zoe Haggerty QARNNS, HMS Queen Elizabeth

=== British Empire Medal (BEM) ===
- Pamela Dawn Abbott. Community Champion, Wm Morrisons Supermarkets plc. For services to Community Engagement in Wakefield during the Covid-19 Response. (Leeds, West Yorkshire)
- Rachel Adam. Project Director, Museums Northumberland Bait. For services to Arts and Culture. (Newcastle upon Tyne, Tyne and Wear)
- David Adamson. Honorary Chieftain, Burntisland Highland Games. For services to Athletics and to the community in Burntisland, Fife. (Burntisland, Fife)
- Rhammel Emmanual Basil Afflick. For services to the community in London. (London, Greater London)
- Samira Ahmad. Assistant Scientific Officer, Animal and Plant Health Agency. For services to Animal Health during the Covid-19 Response and to the community in Woking, Surrey. (Addlestone, Surrey)
- Azeem Alam. Co-Founder, BiteMedicine and Junior Doctor, Guy's and St Thomas' NHS Foundation Trust. For services to Medical Education during Covid-19. (Harpenden, Hertfordshire)
- Maxine Ann Allan. Chief Executive Officer and Trustee, Whiteleys Retreat. For services to Young People with Cancer and NHS Front Line Workers in Ayr during the Covid-19 Response. (Ayr, Ayrshire)
- Jason David Graeme Allen. Youth Worker, St Mary's Centre. For services to Young People in North West London. (London, Greater London)
- Alexander John Anderson. For voluntary and charitable services to People with Autism in Caerleon-on-Usk, Wales. (Newport, Gwent)
- Richard Anthony Andrews. For services to the community in Portchester, Hampshire. (Portchester, Hampshire)
- Gillian Elizabeth Angel. Community Development Officer, RAF Scampton. For services to Royal Air Force Personnel and their Families. (Market Rasen, Lincolnshire)
- Peter John Ansell. For services to Seal Conservation in Norfolk. (Great Yarmouth, Norfolk)
- Harry Mario Aquilina. Firefighter, London Fire Brigade. For services to the community in London during the Covid-19 Response. (Edenbridge, Kent)
- Elizabeth Caroline Armstrong. For services to Archaeology and to the community in Norwich. (Norwich, Norfolk)
- Kenneth Edward Ashby. Lately Watch Commander, Suffolk Fire and Rescue Service. For services to the community in Suffolk and to the Firefighters Charity. (Newmarket, Suffolk)
- Richard Anthony Ashman. Library Co-ordinator, City College, Southampton. For services to Further Education. (Southampton, Hampshire)
- Arnold Wilson Ashworth. For voluntary and charitable services to the community in Whitworth, Lancashire. (Rochdale, Greater Manchester)
- Fiona Jane Auty. Head of Government Relations, National Physical Laboratory. For services to Science and Engineering Communication. (London, Greater London)
- Keith Andrew Axbey. Cub Scout Leader. For services to Scouting and Canoeing in Surrey and South West London. (London, Greater London)
- Samantha Jane Axbey. For voluntary service to Girlguiding in Wimbledon, London. (London, Greater London)
- David Bailey. Northumbrian Piper. For services to Music. (Newcastle upon Tyne, Tyne and Wear)
- Kirsty Baird. For services to Singing, Mental Health and to the community in Edinburgh, Fife and the Lothians during the Covid-19 Response. (Edinburgh)
- Ann Mary Ball. For services to the community in Shoreham, Kent. (Sevenoaks, Kent)
- Lisa Barker. Firefighter, London Fire Brigade. For services to the community in London during the Covid-19 Response. (London, Greater London)
- Michael Barlow. For services to the community in Tameside, Greater Manchester. (Dukinfield, Greater Manchester)
- Deirdre Majella Josephine Barr TD. Clinical Manager, St John Ambulance. For voluntary service to the NHS Nightingale Hospital, London, during the Covid-19 Response. (London, Greater London)
- Warren Karl Baxter. Physiotherapist, Integrated Community Reablement Service, Merseycare NHS Foundation Trust. For services to the NHS during the Covid-19 Response. (Southport, Merseyside)
- Janet Christine Bays. For services to the community in Wisbech, Cambridgeshire. (Wisbech, Cambridgeshire)
- Kim Teresa Beck. Librarian, Langley School, Solihull. For services to Education in the West Midlands. (Solihull, West Midlands)
- Gloria June Beharrell. For charitable services in Shrewsbury, Shropshire. (Shrewsbury, Shropshire)
- Hugh Kirkpatrick Paul Bell. Chairman, Board of Governors, Aughnacloy College. For voluntary service to Education in Northern Ireland. (Aughnacloy, County Tyrone)
- Andrew Thomas Bendon. Emergency Response Volunteer, British Red Cross. For voluntary service in Cambridgeshire during the Covid-19 Response. (Willingham, Cambridgeshire)
- Anand Bhatt. Co-founder, Aakash Odedra Company. For services to Dance and to the community in Leicester. (Leicester, Leicestershire)
- Salma Bi. For services to Cricket and to Diversity in Sport. (Birmingham, West Midlands)
- Kenneth Birkby JP. For voluntary service to Young People in Buckinghamshire. (Aylesbury, Buckinghamshire)
- Paul Birkby. Business Continuity Manager, BAE Systems Submarines. For services to the community in Barrow-in-Furness, Cumbria, during the Covid-19 Response. (Barrow-in-Furness, Cumbria)
- Noreen Bishop. Inclusion Assistant, Laurel Lane Primary School, West Drayton. For services to Education in the London Borough of Hillingdon. (London, Greater London)
- Michael David Black. For services to the Jewish Community in Northern Ireland. (Belfast)
- Judith Blacow. Chair, Board of Trustees, NEO Community. For charitable services to the community on Wirral. (Wirral, Merseyside)
- Donald John Blair. Volunteer, 1st Greenisland Company, The Boys' Brigade. For services to Young People in County Antrim. (Carrickfergus, County Antrim)
- Jennifer Bliss. For voluntary service to the Topsham Museum, South Devon. (Exeter, Devon)
- Stephen Boulton. Instructor, MAPS Karate Club. For services to Karate and the community in Swinton, South Yorkshire. (Swinton, South Yorkshire)
- Terry Nicholas Bracher. Manager, Heritage Services. For services to Heritage and Public Libraries in Wiltshire. (Corsham, Wiltshire)
- Michael Ernest Braycotton. Secretary, Disability and Carers Community Network and Business Support Assistant, Criminal Justice Department, West Midlands Police. For services to Policing. (Walsall, West Midlands)
- David Brewster. Lately Strategic Engineering Manager, East Sussex Fire and Rescue Service. For services to Fire Safety. (Hastings, East Sussex)
- Vicki Broad. Head of Long Term Care, Hywel Dda University Health Board. For services to the NHS in Wales during the Covid-19 Response. (Neath, West Glamorgan)
- Paul Stanley Brockman. Woodland Manager, Hoburne Bashley, New Forest. For services to Woodland Management and Nature Conservation. (New Milton, Hampshire)
- Jennifer Brouard. Citizens in Policing Manager, Essex Police. For services to Policing and to the Voluntary Sector. (Frinton-on-Sea, Essex)
- David William Brown. For services to the community in York. (York, North Yorkshire)
- William Brown. For services to Food Economy in Northern Ireland. (Belfast)
- George Iven Brown. For services to Business and to the community in Omagh, County Tyrone. (Omagh, County Tyrone)
- Ian David Eric Brown. Volunteer, H.M. Coastguard. For services to Voluntary Search and Rescue. (Swanage, Dorset)
- Pearl May Brunning. For services to the community in Eriswell, Suffolk. (Brandon, Suffolk)
- Deborah Patricia Buck. Clinical Practice Lead, East London Foundation Trust. For services to Mental Health Nursing, particularly during the Covid-19 Response. (Wellingborough, Northamptonshire)
- Richard Burnell. For services to Young People and to the community in Holyhead, Anglesey. (Anglesey, Gwynedd)
- Jo Busson. For services to the community in Harlow, Essex. (Harlow, Essex)
- David Terrance Butler. Access Manager, Translink. For services to Public Transport in Northern Ireland. (Castledawson, County Londonderry)
- Martin Cable. Watch Manager, Essex Fire and Rescue Service. For services to the community in Maldon. (Maldon, Essex)
- Sarah Louise Cairns. Senior Programme Manager, Asda Ltd Online Grocery. For services to Retail Customers during the Covid-19 Response. (Huddersfield, West Yorkshire)
- James Murdoch Cameron. Data Scientist, Asda Supermarkets Ltd. For services to the Vulnerable Customers during the Covid-19 Response. (Leeds, West Yorkshire)
- Margaret Campbell. For services to Pipe Bands and Sollus Highland Dancers. (Derry)
- Jacqueline Campbell. For charitable services to the Children's Hospital Association Scotland, particularly during the Covid-19 Response. (Dundee, Angus)
- Deborah Campbell. Technical Specialist, Environment Agency. For services to Flood Protection and voluntary service to Young People. (Market Rasen, Lincolnshire)
- Paul John Campion. For services to the community in Middleton, Manchester. (Middleton, Greater Manchester)
- Richard Carley. For services to the community in Woodchurch, Kent. (Woodchurch, Kent)
- Harry Albert George Carlisle. For services to World War I and II Remembrance. (Macclesfield, Cheshire)
- Linda Carrington. Food Retail Worker, SPAR. For services to Customers during the Covid-19 Response. (Hull, East Riding of Yorkshire)
- Norma Carroll. Lately Director of Music, Coloma Convent Girls' School. For services to Education in the London Borough of Croydon. (London, Greater London)
- Joycelyn Carson. For services to Reserve Forces and Cadets in Northern Ireland. (Lurgan, County Armagh)
- Jean Elizabeth Casha. For voluntary service to the Duke of Edinburgh Award Scheme in West Molesey, Surrey. (Epsom, Surrey)
- Mary Julie Chapman. Founder, Nuzzlets Charity, York. For services to Children with Special Educational Needs and Disabilities. (Great Ouseburn, North Yorkshire)
- Desmond Victor James Cheyne. For services to the community in Banff during the Covid-19 Response. (Banff, Banffshire)
- Swaran Chowdhary. For services to Kidney Research UK, Organ Donation and South Asian communities in Scotland. (Glasgow, Glasgow)
- Imran Ahmed Chowdhury. For services to Community Cohesion in Northampton. (Northampton, Northamptonshire)
- Golam Mahbab Alam Chowdhury. Refugee Support Staff and Emergency Responder, British Red Cross. For services to Healthcare during the Covid-19 Response. (Portsmouth, Hampshire)
- Wendy Clapham. Assistant Director, Nursing Services for Critical Care, Northern Care Alliance NHS Group. For services to Nursing, particularly during the Covid-19 Response. (Oldham, Greater Manchester)
- Anne Claydon. Ward Manager, Barts Health NHS Trust. For services to Nursing during Covid-19. (Colchester, Essex)
- Myrtle Joan Clements. For services to Health and Social Care in Northern Ireland. (Omagh, County Tyrone)
- Elaine Anne Cloutman-Green. Principal Clinical Scientist, Infection Prevention and Control and Joint Trust Lead Healthcare Scientist, Great Ormond Street Hospital NHS Foundation Trust. For services to Healthcare. (Loughton, Essex)
- Sheila Ethel Cole. For services to the community in Pinner, London Borough of Harrow. (London, Greater London)
- Ella Jane Collins. Community Champion, Wm Morrisons Supermarkets plc. For services to the community during the Covid-19 Response. (Springthorpe, South Yorkshire)
- Isabella Collum. For services to Young People and to the community in Fivemiletown, County Tyrone. (Fivemiletown, County Tyrone)
- Theresa Valerie Conway. Treasurer, Aberconwy Physically Handicapped and Able Bodied Club. For services to People with Disabilities and to the community in Llandudno. (Conwy, Clwyd)
- Annie Irvine Cook. For voluntary services to Older and Isolated People in East Belfast. (Belfast)
- Margaret Scott Cook. For services to Ayrshire Hospice. (Irvine, Ayrshire)
- Fiona Jayne Copeland. Lately Chair, Primary Ciliary Dyskinesia Family Support Group. For services to Raising Awareness of Primary Ciliary Dyskinesia. (Milton Keynes, Buckinghamshire)
- Daniel Martin Corr. For services to Martial Arts and to Community Relations in Glengormley, County Antrim. (Newtownabbey, County Antrim)
- Elizabeth Corrigan. General Practice Nurse and Professional Lead Facilitator, Black Country and West Birmingham Clinical Commissioning Groups. For services to Nursing during Covid-19. (Wolverhampton, West Midlands)
- Helen Martha Coulter. For services to Cancer and Stoma Patients in Northern Ireland. (Antrim, County Antrim)
- Debra Courtenay-Crane. Head Coach, Carterton Gymnastics Club. For services to Gymnastics and to Young People in Carterton, Oxfordshire. (North Leigh, Oxfordshire)
- Barnabas Jester Cox. For voluntary services to Health Workers in Scotland during the Covid-19 Response. (Edinburgh, Midlothian)
- Geoffrey Crabb. For services to the Scouts in Templecombe, Somerset. (Templecombe, Somerset)
- Thomas William Robert Croft. For services to the Arts and to Charity during the Covid-19 Response. (Oxford, Oxfordshire)
- Margaret Helen Croy. For voluntary service to St Magnus Cathedral and to the community in Orkney. (Kirkwall, Orkney)
- Geoffrey James Crump. Researcher, Cheshire Military Museum. For services to Military Heritage. (Chester, Cheshire)
- Richard Curtis. Landlord, the Portsmouth Arms, Basingstoke. For services to Charity and to the community in Hampshire during the Covid-19 Response. (Basingstoke, Hampshire)
- Patricia Anne Dallas. Volunteer and Founding Member, Ballywillan Girls' Brigade. For voluntary service to Young People in Coleraine, County Londonderry. (Coleraine, County Londonderry)
- Jacqui Darlington. For services to the community in Rutland. (Oakham, Rutland)
- Freda May Davies. For services to the community in Worcester. (Worcester, Worcestershire)
- Robert Malcolm Davies. Special Constable, South Wales Police. For voluntary service to Policing. (Neath, West Glamorgan)
- Freda Davis. For services to the NSPCC and to the community in the London Borough of Bromley. (London, Greater London)
- Jon Martin Davis. Manager, Dewsbury Library. For services to Public Libraries during Covid-19. (Holmfirth, West Yorkshire)
- Asha Rani Day. Nurse, Health Visitor and Clinical Team Leader; Leicestershire Partnership NHS Trust. For services to the NHS and to Minority Ethnic Equality during the Covid-19 Response. (Fleckney, Leicestershire)
- Michael John Deakin. For voluntary services to Scouting and to Charity in Staffordshire. (Silverdale, Staffordshire)
- Anne Chadwick Dearle. Volunteer, Save the Children. For services to Fundraising. (Sherborne, Dorset)
- Keith Delderfield. Director of Operations, The Douglas Bader Foundation and Deputy Director, The Guttmann Sports Centre Stoke Mandeville. For services to People with Disabilities. (Tring, Hertfordshire)
- Geoffrey Michael Dimmock. For services to the community in Leighton Buzzard, Bedfordshire. (Leighton Buzzard, Bedfordshire)
- Elizabeth Doherty. Receptionist, Belfast Campus, Ulster University. For services to Higher Education. (Larne, County Antrim)
- Thomas Edward Donnelly. For services to Peace and Reconciliation in Brookeborough, County Fermanagh. (Brookeborough, County Fermanagh)
- Brigid Doyle. Head of Childcare, Queen's University Belfast. For services to Higher Education. (Newry, County Down)
- Richard Dugdale. For services to the community in Clitheroe, Lancashire. (Clitheroe, Lancashire)
- Sandra Denise Duncan. Lately Aviation Security Adviser, Department for Transport. For services to Transport and to People with Disabilities. (London, Greater London)
- Sophie Jane Dunnett. For services to Amateur Athletics in Scotland. (Reay, Caithness)
- Karen Christina Eccleston. For services to the community of Darlaston, West Midlands. (Darlaston, West Midlands)
- Lancelot Bamidele Harvey Edmondson. Police Constable, Metropolitan Police Service. For services to Community Policing in Lambeth, London. (London, Greater London)
- Yasin Matthew Ross El Ashrafi. Founder, HQ Recording Studio, Leicester. For services to Young People, to Music and to Mentoring. (Leicester, Leicestershire)
- Karen Elliot. Secretary, Scottish Area, Royal Naval Association and Social Secretary, City of Edinburgh Branch, Chair, Association of Wrens and Women of the Royal Naval Services Edinburgh and District Branch. For voluntary service to Royal Navy Veterans. (Livingston, West Lothian)
- George Leonard Ellis. For services to Young People and to the community in Abergele, North Wales. (Conwy, Clwyd)
- Janet Ellis. Programme Co-ordinator, Science, South Devon College. For services to Education. (Kingskerswell, Devon)
- Peter William Elmont. Chair, Weston-Super-Mare Fundraising Branch, Royal National Lifeboat Institution. For charitable services to Maritime Safety. (Weston-super-Mare, Somerset)
- Alan Trevor Emby. For services to the community in Broadstairs, Kent. (Broadstairs, Kent)
- David Michael English. Director, English Care Ltd. For services to Social Care during the Covid-19 Response. (Shrewsbury, Shropshire)
- Jennifer Helen English. Director, English Care Ltd. For services to Social Care during Covid-19. (Shrewsbury, Shropshire)
- Margaret Anne Esslemont. For services to Young People in Roundhay, Leeds through Girlguiding UK. (Leeds, West Yorkshire)
- Malcolm Farrar. Road Safety Officer, Shropshire Council. For services to Education. (Oswestry, Shropshire)
- Amy Farrell. Occupational Therapist, Integrated Community Reablement Service, Merseycare NHS Foundation Trust. For services to the NHS during the Covid-19 Response. (Wirral, Merseyside)
- Richard Sperrin Fawcett. Chair, Friends of Thurston Library. For services to Public Libraries. (Thurston, Suffolk)
- Neil Ferries. For services to the community in Wakefield, West Yorkshire during the Covid-19 Response. (Sittingbourne, Kent)
- Pamela Mary Fisher. For voluntary service to the community in Cambridgeshire. (Cambridge, Cambridgeshire)
- Catherine Mary Fitzsimmons. Lately Palliative Care Nurse, Northern Care Alliance NHS Group. For services to Nursing during the Covid-19 Response. (Eccles, Greater Manchester)
- Alistair Charles Forbes. Co-founder, Scottish Tech Army. For services to Charity during the Covid-19 Response. (Edinburgh)
- Margaret Foster. For services to Young People in Portsea, Hampshire and to the Portsmouth Mudlarks. (Portsmouth, Hampshire)
- Thomas Reynold Fowler. Technical Leader, Environment Agency. For services to the Environment. (Ringwood, Hampshire)
- Richard James Foxley. For voluntary service to the NHS during the Covid-19 Response. (Edinburgh)
- Daniel Edward Gallimore. Founder, Have Stick Will Travel. For services to People with Visual Impairments in Bristol. (Henleage, Bristol)
- Joanne Gates. Food Retail Worker, The Co-operative Group. For services to the Food Supply Chain during the Covid-19 Response. (Romford, Essex)
- Laura Jane Gaudion. Assistant Director, Commissioning for Adult Social Care, Isle of Wight Council. For services to Social Care during the Covid-19 Response. (Newport, Isle of Wight)
- Stephen Christopher Gee. Biomedical Scientist, East Suffolk and North Essex NHS Foundation Trust. For services to the NHS during the Covid-19 Response. (Ipswich, Suffolk)
- Patricia Diane Geraghty. Pharmacist Dispensing Technician, Lloyds Pharmacy. For services to Pharmacy Services in Leek, Staffordshire during the Covid-19 Response. (Leek, Staffordshire)
- John Gilfillan. Director, John Gilfillan Funeral Directors. For services to Bereaved People and to the community in Fife. (Cardenden, Fife)
- Sharon Elizabeth Gill. For services to Kickboxing and to Young People in Bristol. (Bristol)
- Martyne Girvan. Higher Officer, Fraud Investigation Service, H.M. Revenue and Customs. For services to Mental Health Support during the Covid-19 Response. (Belfast)
- Ashley Dale Matthew Gordon. Firefighter, London Fire Brigade. For services to the community in London during the Covid-19 Response. (London, Greater London)
- Rebecca Gorman. Store Manager, Marks and Spencer. For voluntary service in Greater Manchester during the Covid-19 Response. (Manchester, Greater Manchester)
- George Kenneth Graham. For services to Young People and to the community in Fivemiletown, County Tyrone. (Clogher, County Tyrone)
- Evelyn Graham. For services to Badminton and to the community in County Antrim. (Dunadry, County Antrim)
- Judith Sarah Colette Graham. Queen's Nurse, Director for Psychological Professionals and Freedom to Speak Up Guardian, Rotherham, Doncaster and South Humber NHS Foundation Trust. For services to the NHS during the Covid-19 Response. (Gainsborough, Lincolnshire)
- Rosemary Alexandra Gregson. For services to the community in Wetherby, West Yorkshire. (Wetherby, West Yorkshire)
- Daljit Singh Grewal. For services to the community in West London, particularly during the Covid-19 Response. (London, Greater London)
- Richard Llewelyn Griffiths. Lifeboat Operations Manager, Aberystwyth Lifeboat Station. For services to the Royal National Lifeboat Institution in Wales. (Aberystwyth, Dyfed)
- Ann Elizabeth Gumery. Fundraiser, Macmillan Cancer Support. For services to Cancer Patients. (Solihull, West Midlands)
- Louise Hadley. Section Manager, Marks and Spencer. For services to Customers and the community in Harborne, Birmingham during the Covid-19 Response. (Stourbridge, West Midlands)
- Joshua Hale. For services to the community in Bath, Somerset during the Covid-19 Response. (Bath, Somerset)
- Karen Joanne Hamilton. For voluntary service to Young People with Autism and Learning Difficulties in Belfast. (Belfast)
- Sarah Jane Hampton. For voluntary service to the Hastings Foodbank. (Hastings, East Sussex)
- Joyce Harris. For community and voluntary services to Cats in Loughborough. (Loughborough, Leicestershire)
- Bruce Harris. For voluntary service to the Duke of Edinburgh Award Scheme in Cumnock, Ayrshire. (Ayr, Ayrshire)
- David Hartley. Volunteer, Church Lads' and Church Girls' Brigade. For services to Young People in Longridge, Lancashire. (Longridge, Lancashire)
- Paul Hebborn. British Red Cross Staff Member and volunteer. For services to the Vulnerable in Northamptonshire during the Covid-19 Response. (Leicester, Leicestershire)
- William Henderson. For voluntary service in the Shetland Islands. (Lerwick, Shetland)
- Susan Henry. Baby Friendly Lead, East Lancashire Hospitals NHS Trust. For services to Midwifery in the NHS. (Darwen, Lancashire)
- Sharon Higgins. For services to the Performing Arts in Newport, South Wales. (Newport, Gwent)
- Ann Hill. For voluntary and charitable services to the community in Dumfriesshire. (Dumfries, Dumfries and Galloway)
- Kevin Hindle. For services to the Bowland Pennine Mountain Search and Rescue Team. (Cleveleys, Lancashire)
- Simon Ian Hoar. For services to the community in Babcary, Somerset. (Somerton, Somerset)
- Francis Hodgkinson. Governor, Brownhills School. For services to Education in Walsall. (Walsall, West Midlands)
- Dean Andrew Hoggard. Founder, Life for a Kid Foundation. For charitable services to Young People. (Hull, East Riding of Yorkshire)
- Tamsin Mary Holland Brown. Community Paediatrician, Cambridge Community Services NHS Trust. For services to the NHS during Covid-19. (Cambridge, Cambridgeshire)
- Rita Hollens. For services to the community in Hartford, Cheshire. (Northwich, Cheshire)
- Patricia Ann Holt. Secretary, The Will H Ogilvie Memorial Trust. For services to Poetry. (Annan, Dumfries and Galloway)
- Peter John Hosking. Founder and President, Torbay Prostate Support Association. For services to People with Prostate Cancer. (Paignton, Devon)
- David Howse. Special Inspector, Suffolk Constabulary. For voluntary service to Policing. (Haverhill, Suffolk)
- William Hui. Founder and Musical Director, SingMe Merseyside Choir. For services to the community in Merseyside. (Wirral, Merseyside)
- Leonie Huie. Head of Health and Social Care, Bishop Challoner School, Shadwell, London. For services to Education in the London Borough of Tower Hamlets. (London, Greater London)
- Denise Hunt. For services to the Hospitality Sector and to the community in Carnlough, County Antrim. (Holywood, County Down)
- Pamela Hypher. For services to the community in Surrey. (Guildford, Surrey)
- Brenda Ann Jackson. For services to the community in Woodbridge, Suffolk. (Pettistree, Suffolk)
- Audrey Jackson. For services to the community in Middlesbrough. (Middlesbrough, North Yorkshire)
- David Jackson. For services to the community in Marton-in-Cleveland, North Yorkshire. (Middlesbrough, North Yorkshire)
- Councillor Paul Stephen Jackson. For services to the community in South Wingfield, Derbyshire. (Alfreton, Derbyshire)
- Joanne Jackson. For voluntary service to Young People in Wolverhampton through Girlguiding UK. (Wolverhampton, West Midlands)
- Simon Daniel Jackson-Turner. For services to Sport. (Welwyn Garden City, Hertfordshire)
- Peter Trevenen Jaco. Co-founder, Scottish Tech Army. For services to Charity during the Covid-19 Response. (Edinburgh)
- Reverend William Glynne George James. Principal Police Chaplain, South Wales Police. For services to Police Chaplaincy and to the community in Gorseinon, Swansea. (Swansea, West Glamorgan)
- John Charles Jasper. Volunteer, Coldharbour Mill Working Wool Museum and Wellington Arts Association. For services to Cultural Heritage in Devon and Somerset. (Wellington, Somerset)
- Phyllis Brenda Jeffers. For services to Guiding and to Young People. (Portadown, County Armagh)
- Jane Jervis. For voluntary and charitable services in Shrewsbury. (Shrewsbury, Shropshire)
- Neil Alfred Jones. For services to the community in Atherstone, Warwickshire. (Atherstone, Warwickshire)
- Audrey May Jones. For services to the community in West Lancashire. (Southport, Merseyside)
- Steven Jones. Systems Auditor and Analysis Manager, South Wales Police. For services to Policing. (Bridgend, Mid Glamorgan)
- Beryl Ann Wilson Jonsen. Teacher, Holy Trinity Primary School, Colchester. For services to Education in Essex. (Colchester, Essex)
- Maya Joshi. For services to the Vulnerable in Leicestershire. (Leicester, Leicestershire)
- Sarah Joyce. Superintendent Optometrist, Asda Supermarkets Ltd. For services to Primary Optical Care during the Covid-19 Response. (York, North Yorkshire)
- John Kane. For services to People with Parkinson's Disease in West Cumbria. (Whitehaven, Cumbria)
- Steven Kapur. Founder, Apache Indian Music Academy. For services to Music and to Young People. (Sutton Coldfield, West Midlands)
- Sanjay Jayenedra Kara. Trustee, BAPS Swaminarayan Sanstha (Neasden Temple). For services to community cohesion and public and charitable service in the UK. (London, Greater London)
- Karen Jane Kembery. Clinical Nurse Specialist, Neath Port Talbot Hospital. For services to Nursing in West Glamorgan. (Swansea, West Glamorgan)
- Peter David Kennard. For services to Charitable Fundraising in Worthing, West Sussex. (Worthing, West Sussex)
- Lorna Keylock. Fundraiser, Brecon and Sennybridge Branch, Cancer Research Wales . For voluntary and charitable services in Brecon. (Brecon, Powys)
- Brian Frederick Keylock. Fundraiser, Brecon and Sennybridge Branch, Cancer Research Wales . For voluntary and charitable services in Brecon. (Brecon, Powys)
- Samah Khalil. Youth Mayor of Oldham. For services to Young People. (Oldham, Greater Manchester)
- Ziaul Khan. For services to the community in Sheffield. (Sheffield, South Yorkshire)
- Nadeem Sadiq Khan. Charity Helpline Housing Adviser and Team Leader, Shelter. For services to the Homeless during the Covid-19 Response. (Sheffield, South Yorkshire)
- David John King. Specialist Paramedic, East of England Ambulance Service. For services to the NHS and to Fundraising. (Cambridge, Cambridgeshire)
- Alan John King. Captain, 1st Barnet Boys' Brigade and Girls' Association. For services to Young People in the London Borough of Barnet. (Barnet, Greater London)
- Elizabeth Anne King. Founder, Square Mile Food Bank. For voluntary service to the community in the City of London during the Covid-19 Response. (London, Greater London)
- Jamie Kinlochan. For services to the Vulnerable during the Covid-19 Response through Who Cares? Scotland. (Paisley, Renfrewshire)
- Catherine Knapp-Evans. For services to the Arts and to the community in Mid Wales. (Caersws, Powys)
- David Charles Knight. For voluntary service to Newport Community Cricket Club, South Wales. (Newport, Gwent)
- Michael John Knight. For voluntary service to Newport Community Cricket Club, South Wales. (Newport, Gwent)
- Janine Koeries. Outreach Worker and Special Educational Needs Co-ordinator, Ealing Primary Centre. For services to Education in Berkshire and West London. (Slough, Berkshire)
- Carl Kwabena Antwi Konadu. Co-founder, 2-3 Degrees. For services to Disadvantaged Young People. (London, Greater London)
- Alan Kenneth Lane. Artistic Director, Slung Low. For services to the community in South Leeds during Covid-19. (Honley, West Yorkshire)
- Debbie Jayne Langford. Chair, Newark Branch, Royal British Legion. For voluntary service to Armed Forces Veterans. (Newark, Nottinghamshire)
- Michelle Leary. Morrisons Community Champion, Basingstoke. For services to the Economy during Covid-19. (Basingstoke, Hampshire)
- Sarah Louise Lee. For services to the community in Oundle, Northamptonshire. (Bristol)
- Jennifer Lee. Founder, Beulah Drop-In Cafe. For services to Art and to Social Inclusion in Aberdeenshire. (Alvah, Banffshire)
- Stephen Lenaghan. For services to Adults with Learning Disabilities and to Tourism in Northern Ireland. (Lisburn, County Antrim)
- Catherine Jean Lindesay. For services to the community in Clifford, Herefordshire. (Clifford, Herefordshire)
- John Nicol Lindsay. For services to the Environment in East Lothian. (Dirleton, East Lothian)
- William Little. For services to the community in Baldwinhome, Cumbria. (Carlisle, Cumbria)
- Paula Morag Lloyd. For services to the Vulnerable in Inverness during the Covid-19 Response. (Inverness, Inverness-shire)
- Paul Edwin Lobley. For services to the community in Derbyshire. (Belper, Derbyshire)
- Gary Russell Longden. For services to the community in Retford, Nottinghamshire. (Retford, Nottinghamshire)
- Vivien Loveday. For services to the community in Bishop's Waltham, Hampshire. (Bishop's Waltham, Hampshire)
- Gerald Lovell. For services to the community in Silverstone, Northamptonshire. (Towcester, Northamptonshire)
- John Fraser MacLean. For services to the community in Shrewsbury, Shropshire. (Shrewsbury, Shropshire)
- Xyza Aura Macutay-Malloch. Manager, Kingsley House. For services to Care during Covid-19. (Tetbury, Gloucestershire)
- Tracy Madge. Interim Associate Chief Nurse, NHS Nottingham and Nottinghamshire CCG. For services to Healthcare during Covid-19. (Burton Joyce, Nottinghamshire)
- Haroon Mahmood. Relief Manager, Wells Pharmacy, Darlaston. For services to the community in the West Midlands, particularly during Covid-19. (Coventry, West Midlands)
- Louise Alexandra Maltby. Matron, Intensive Care Unit, Ashford and St Peters Hospital Foundation Trust. For services to Nursing during the Covid-19 Response. (Woking, Surrey)
- John Mapletoft. For services to Table Tennis. (Grantham, Lincolnshire)
- Christopher Lloyd Martin. Watch Manager and Firefighter, Dorset and Wiltshire Fire and Rescue Service. For services to the community in Ramsbury, Wiltshire. (Ramsbury, Wiltshire)
- Alana Lorraine McAllister. For services to the community in County Antrim. (Ballymena, County Antrim)
- Jennifer Ann McArtney. For services to Squash. (Monifieth, Angus)
- Rhys Joshua McClenaghan. For services to Gymnastics. (Newtownards, County Down)
- Patricia Ann McCulloch. For services to the community in Gloucester. (Cheltenham, Gloucestershire)
- Maureen McKeown. For services to the community in Dungannon, County Tyrone. (Dungannon, County Tyrone)
- Violet McKeown. For voluntary services to People with Cancer and Lymphedema in Northern Ireland. (Newtownards, County Down)
- Jonathan Peter McMillen. Executive Officer, Syrian Refugee Project, Department for Communities, Northern Ireland Executive. For services Refugees. (Belfast)
- Julia Elizabeth Micklewright. Founder and Chair, ASPIE. For services to people with Asperger's Syndrome. (Worcester, Worcestershire)
- George Andrew Middlemiss DL. Chairman, Perth and Kinross Branch, SSAFA. For voluntary service to ex-Service Personnel. (Kinross, Perth and Kinross)
- Elspeth Millen. For services to Social Housing and to the community in Govan, Glasgow. (Glasgow, Glasgow)
- Robert Geoffrey Moore. Assistant Scout Leader, 1st Sywell Air Scout Group. For voluntary service to the community in Northamptonshire. (Corby, Northamptonshire)
- Nigel Charles Morgan. For services to the community in Tameside, Manchester. (Stalybridge, Cheshire)
- Sandra May Morgan. For political and public service in Wales. (Ammanford, Dyfed)
- Dennis Murphy. For services to Veterans' Football in Merthyr Tydfil, Mid Glamorgan. (Merthyr Tydfil, Mid Glamorgan)
- Wilfred Dennis Nathanielsz. Awards Manager, Queen's Awards Office, Department for Business, Energy and Industrial Strategy. For services to Diversity and to Inclusion. (London, Greater London)
- Mary Nelson. For services to Homeless People in Moray. (Kinloss, Moray)
- Rachel Mary Nichols. For voluntary service to the Topsham Museum, South Devon. (Exeter, Devon)
- Gemma Normensell. Facilities Manager, Marks and Spencer. For services to Members of Staff in Castle Donington during Covid-19. (Nottingham, Nottinghamshire)
- Stephen Nottage. Chair, The SAM Fund. For voluntary and charitable services to Sick and Disabled Children. (London, Greater London)
- Jeanne Olive Nuttall. Head, Service Nutrition and Dietetics, Powys Teaching Health Board. For services to Dietetics and Nutrition in Wales. (Llanidloes, Powys)
- Edward Nuzum. Lifeboat Operations Manager, The Lizard Lifeboat Station. For services to the Royal National Lifeboat Institution and to Maritime Safety in Cornwall. (Helston, Cornwall)
- Kerry-Anne Louise O'Brien. For services to Young People in London. (London, Greater London)
- Aakash Odedra. Co-founder, Aakash Odedra Company. For services to Dance and to the community in Leicester. (Leicester, Leicestershire)
- Elizabeth O'Donnell. For voluntary and charitable services to the community in Derry. (Derry)
- Peggy Margaret Mary O'Dwyer. For services to the community in Derry. (Derry)
- Rafal Olbert. Data Scientist, Asda Supermarkets Ltd. For services to the Economy and to Vulnerable Customers during the Covid-19 Response. (Leeds, West Yorkshire)
- Arthur Wilfred David Ovens. For services to Peace and Reconciliation in Brookeborough, County Fermanagh. (Brookeborough, County Fermanagh)
- Patricia Anne Owen. For services to the community in Feltham, London Borough of Hounslow. (London, Greater London)
- Emrys Thomas Owen. Health Care Assistant, Royal Star & Garter Charity. For services to Veterans during Covid-19. (Dorking, Surrey)
- Jacques Michael Olson Oxenham. Inspector, Metropolitan Police Special Constabulary. For services to Policing. (London, Greater London)
- Ayesha Pakravan-Ovey. Founder, The Plattery and Vital Meals. For services to charity and to Vulnerable People during the Covid-19 Response. (London, Greater London)
- Sheila Mary McCafferty Palmer. For services to the community in North Down, Northern Ireland. (Bangor, County Down)
- Charlotte Park. Founder, Treats for Troops on Tour. For services to the Armed Forces. (Catterick Garrison, North Yorkshire)
- Sally Catherine Parry-Wingfield. Trustee and Chair, Turner's House. For voluntary service to Heritage. (London, Greater London)
- Susan Joy Partridge-Underwood. For services to the Bozeat Windmill Singers, Wellingborough, Northamptonshire. (Bozeat, Northamptonshire)
- Harilal Narandas Patel. For services to Community Cohesion in Cardiff. (Cardiff, South Glamorgan)
- Christina Peacock. For services to Boxing. (Plymouth, Devon)
- Chris Pedlar. Specialist Team Member, Environment Agency. For services to Prostate Cancer Awareness. (Holsworthy, Devon)
- Emily Victoria Penn. Co-founder, eXXpedition. For services to Conservation and to Charity. (London, Greater London)
- John Perry. Band Leader, 1st Ibstock Scout Band. For services to Scouting in Leicestershire. (Ibstock, Leicestershire)
- Sarah Pickering. For charitable services in Cheshire. (Winsford, Cheshire)
- Gabriella Isabel Pimentel. Musculoskeletal Clinical Specialist, Warrior Sports Rehabilitation. For services to the Elderly during Covid-19. (Cambridge, Cambridgeshire)
- James Hamilton Porter. For services to Cancer Research and the community in Castlederg, County Tyrone. (Castlederg, County Tyrone)
- Maureen Powell. For services to the community in St Oswald's, Merseyside. (Liverpool, Merseyside)
- Stephen Pratt. For services to the community in Sedgefield, County Durham. (Stockton-on-Tees, County Durham)
- Christopher James Preshaw. Chief Technician, School of Biological Sciences, Queen's University Belfast. For services to Higher Education. (Lisburn, County Antrim)
- Khakan Munir Qureshi. Senior Independent Living Officer, Midland Heart. For services to LGBT Equality. (Wednesbury, West Midlands)
- Stevo Radjen. For voluntary and charitable services in South West England. (Brockenhurst, Hampshire)
- Aminur Khosru Rahman. Chair, Kent Area Committee, Institution of Mechanical Engineers. For services to Education. (Chatham, Kent)
- Syedur Rahman. For services to Charity in Leicester. (Leicester, Leicestershire)
- Azizur Rahman. Foods Section Manager, Marks and Spencer. For services to the community in London during the Covid-19 Response. (London, Greater London)
- Martin Andrew Rowley. For services to the community in York. (York, North Yorkshire)
- Peter Warden
- Curtis Woodhouse

=== Queen's Police Medal (QPM) ===
Ribbon bar of the Queen's Police Medal for Distinguished Service

England and Wales

- Sergeant Timothy John Barrell, South Wales Police
- Sally Benatar, lately Chief Superintendent, Metropolitan Police Service
- Superintendent Andrew Philip Bennett, Avon and Somerset Police
- Detective Chief Inspector Jasmine Michelle Frost, Essex Police
- Detective Chief Superintendent Kate Halpin, Metropolitan Police Service
- Constable Philip Paul Hanham, Thames Valley Police
- Adrian Hanstock, Deputy Chief Constable, British Transport Police
- Detective Chief Superintendent Stuart Paul Hooper, Essex Police
- Chief Superintendent Jane Johnson, Metropolitan Police Service
- Jason Dale Masters, Temporary Assistant Chief Constable, Leicestershire Police
- Robert John Nixon, Deputy Chief Constable, Leicestershire Police
- Martin George Pasmore, lately Detective Chief Inspector, Essex Police
- Detective Chief Inspector Jennifer Rita Pearson, West Midlands Police
- Gary Roberts, Chief Constable, Isle of Man Constabulary
- Mark Andrew Roberts, Deputy Chief Constable, South Yorkshire Police
- William Alan Skelly, lately Chief Constable, Lincolnshire Police
- Detective Inspector Michelle Catherine Stoten, Essex Police
- Michael Taylor, lately, Detective Constable, Surrey Police
- Detective Chief Superintendent Richard Tucker, Metropolitan Police Service
- Nikki Watson, Assistant Chief Constable, Avon and Somerset Police
- Temporary Superintendent Hannah Faith Wheeler, Metropolitan Police Service
- Detective Inspector Caroline Anne Williams, Essex Police
- Kerrin Wilson, Assistant Chief Constable, Lincolnshire Police

Northern Ireland

- Detective Chief Inspector Norman James Lewis, Police Service of Northern Ireland
- Constable Robert McAllen, Police Service of Northern Ireland
- Inspector Mark Roberts, Police Service of Northern Ireland

Overseas

- Alwin James, Deputy Commissioner of Police, Royal Virgin Islands Police

=== Queen's Fire Service Medal (QFSM) ===
Ribbon bar of the Queen's Fire Service Medal for Distinguished Service

England and Wales

- Benjamin James Thomas Ansell, Chief Fire Officer, Dorset and Wiltshire Fire and Rescue Service
- Andrew James Cole, Area Manager, Dorset and Wiltshire Fire and Rescue Service
- Stuart Errington, Chief Fire Officer, County Durham and Darlington Fire and Rescue Service
- Trevor David Ferguson, Chief Fire Officer, Royal Berkshire Fire and Rescue Service
- David Charles Pitt, Crew Commander, West Midlands Fire Service
- Lynsey Seal, Principal Fire Engineer, London Fire Brigade
- Christopher John Strickland, Chief Fire Officer, Cambridgeshire Fire and Rescue Service

Scotland

- Martin Blunden, Chief Officer, Scottish Fire and Rescue Service

=== Queen's Ambulance Service Medal (QAM) ===
Ribbon bar of the Queen's Ambulance Service Medal for Distinguished Service

England and Wales

- Lee David Brooks, Director of Operations, Frontline Emergency Ambulance Response, Non-Emergency Patient Transport Service and Clinical Contact Centre Services, Welsh Ambulance Service NHS Trust
- Martin Flaherty, OBE, Managing Director, Association of Ambulance Chief Executives
- Cathryn Jean James, Clinical Pathways Manager, Yorkshire Ambulance Service NHS Trust
- Clare Elizabeth Langshaw, Ambulance Operations Manager, Resilience and Specialist Operations, Welsh Ambulance Service NHS Trust
- Keith Rowland Prior, National Director, National Ambulance Resilience Unit (NARU), West Midlands Ambulance Service University NHS Foundation Trust

Scotland

- Stephanie Jones, Acting Head of Clinical Services, Scottish Ambulance Service
- Araf Saddiq, Paramedic, Scottish Ambulance Service

Northern Ireland

- Margaret Mary Barclay, Resource Manager, Northern Ireland Ambulance Service

=== Queen's Volunteer Reserves Medal (QVRM) ===
Ribbon bar of the Queen's Volunteer Reserves Medal

- Corporal Anthony John French, VR, The Royal Logistics Corps, Army Reserve.
- Major Keith James, MBE, JP, VR, Corps of Royal Engineers (V).
- Colonel David Middleton, MBE, TD, VR, Army Reserve.
- Captain Dennis Paterson, VR, Royal Regiment of Artillery, Army Reserve.
- Sergeant (now acting Flight Sergeant) Christopher Medley
- Sergeant Ian James Stafford

=== Meritorious Service Medal (MSM) ===
Ribbon bar of the Meritorious Service Medal

- Warrant Officer J. C. Ibbs
- Warrant Officer J. S. A. Wright
- WO1 Warfare Specialist I. M. Conolly
- Warrant Officer Class 1 J. K. Edwards
- Warrant Officer Class 1 C. A. S. Walbrook

== Crown Dependencies ==
=== The Most Excellent Order of the British Empire ===
==== Member of the Order of the British Empire (MBE) ====
Guernsey

- Heidi Soulsby
- Sue Fleming
- Nicky Harrison for her work in the community during the pandemic.

Jersey

- Andrew Le Gallais for his contribution to the farming industry.
- Neil Maclachlan for helping couples have children through fertility treatment.
- Clare Ryder for her work in mental health services.
- Marc Burton for his role as project director of Jersey's Nightingale Hospital.
- Glenn De La Haye for his work in safeguarding vulnerable people.

Isle of Man

- John Riley
- Jane Glover
- Christian Varley
- Susan Waddecar
- Charles Guard

=== British Empire Medal (BEM) ===
Guernsey

- Ronnie Cairnduff for his services to entertainment and culture

Jersey

- Mark Jones for his services to Jersey's learning disability community.

Isle of Man

- Edna Clarke

=== Queen's Police Medal (QPM) ===
Isle of Man

- Gary Roberts

== The Bahamas ==
=== The Most Distinguished Order of Saint Michael and Saint George ===
==== Companion of the Order of St Michael and St George (CMG) ====
- Merceline Dahl-Regis. For services to Public and Community health.

=== Order of the British Empire|The Most Excellent Order of the British Empire ===
==== Commander of the Order of the British Empire (CBE) ====
Civil

- James Mitchell Pinder. For services to Politics and to Business.
- Walter Wells. For services to Business and to Industry.

==== Officer of the Order of the British Empire (OBE) ====
Civil

- Charles William Diggiss. For services to Medicine.
- Frederik Gottlieb. For services to Politics and to Industry.
- His Excellency the Honourable Jeffrey Williams. For his contribution to Sport and to Civic services.

==== Member of the Order of the British Empire (MBE) ====
Civil

- Charlotte Joanne Albury. For services to Philanthropy, to Civic Engagement and to Commerce.
- Jason Matthew Albury. For his contribution to Environmental Stewardship, to Altruism and to the Community.
- The Reverend Remelda Carey. For services to the Community.
- Captain Whitfield Neely. For services to the Nation.
- Grover Martin Pinder. For services to the Community.
- Ruban Roberts. For services to Business and to Civic involvement.
- Chad Wilson Sawyer. For services to Business.

=== British Empire Medal (BEM) ===
- Laura Benson. For services to Religion and to Community activities.
- Jeanette Elizabeth Davis. For services to the Community.
- Chenena Gibson. For services to Politics and to Civic involvement.
- Etienne Farquharson Jr. For services to Business and to the Community.
- Neca Cecelia Knowles. For services to Business.
- Linda Mae Sands. For services to the Community.
- Gabriel Styles. For Religious work.
- Boynell Williams. For services to the Community.
- Kenneth Robert Wood. For services to Business and to Politics.
- Judith Ann Webb. For services to Conservation of Wildlife and Habitats in Oxfordshire.

=== Queen's Police Medal (QPM) ===
- Assistant Commissioner Ashton Greenslade, The Royal Bahamas Police.
- Assistant Commissioner Loretta Mackey, The Royal Bahamas Police.

== Grenada ==
=== The Most Excellent Order of the British Empire ===
==== Commander of the Order of the British Empire (CBE) ====
Civil

- Beryl Lucina Isaac, MBE. For public service.

==== Officer of the Order of the British Empire (OBE) ====
Civil

- Augustina Veronica Steele. For services to the Community.

==== Member of the Order of the British Empire (MBE) ====
Civil

- Leo Garbutt. For services to the Hospitality Industry.
- Helena Patrice. For services to Education and to the Community.

=== British Empire Medal (BEM) ===
- Winston Esau David. For services to Culture.
- Thaddeus Claudius Pierre. For services to Agriculture.

== Solomon Islands ==
=== The Most Excellent Order of the British Empire ===
==== Officer of the Order of the British Empire (OBE) ====
Civil

- David Kin Chu Quan, MBE. For services to Commerce and to Community Development.

== Belize ==
=== The Most Excellent Order of the British Empire ===
==== Officer of the Order of the British Empire (OBE) ====
Civil

- Judith Marie Alpuche. For her contribution to Social Work and to public service.
- Marvin Manzanero. For his contribution to Public Health and to public service.

==== Member of the Order of the British Empire (MBE) ====
Civil

- Her Excellency Lou-Anne Burns Martinez. For her contribution to Foreign and public service.
- Elisa Nayeli Montalvo. For her contribution to the field of law and public service.
- Brigadier General Steven Ortega. For his contribution to Security and public service.
- Mapye Yolanda Smith. For services to Entrepreneurship and to the Community.
- Chester Clyde Williams. For his contribution to Security and public service.

== Antigua and Barbuda ==
=== The Most Excellent Order of the British Empire ===
==== Commander of the Order of the British Empire (CBE) ====
Civil

- Hugh Charlesworth Marshall Senior. For services to Antigua and Barbuda.

==== Officer of the Order of the British Empire (OBE) ====
Civil

- John Michael Petrie. For services to Antigua and Barbuda.

== St. Christopher and Nevis ==
=== The Most Excellent Order of the British Empire ===
==== Officer of the Order of the British Empire (OBE) ====
Civil

- Athill Cuthbert Rawlins. For his contribution to public service and land surveying.

==== Member of the Order of the British Empire (MBE) ====
Civil

- Venetta Laws. For services to the Community and to Business Entrepreneurship.
- Collin Tyrell. For services to the Community.

=== Queen's Police Medal (QPM) ===
- Commissioner Hilroy Patrick Brandy, The Royal St. Christopher and Nevis Police.
