= 2001 Australia Day Honours =

The 2001 Australia Day Honours are appointments to various orders and honours to recognise and reward good works by Australian citizens. The list was announced on 26 January 2001 by the Governor General of Australia, Sir William Deane.

The Australia Day Honours are the first of the two major annual honours lists, the first announced to coincide with Australia Day (26 January), with the other being the Queen's Birthday Honours, which are announced on the second Monday in June.

== Order of Australia ==
=== Companion (AC) ===
==== General Division ====
| Recipient | Citation | Notes |
|---|---|---|
| Professor Edwin Thomas Brown | For service to the engineering profession as a world expert in the field of rock mechanics and to scholarship through promotion of the highest academic and professional standards | |
| Professor Warner Max Corden | For service as a leading international economist, particularly in the area of international trade and finance policy development | |
| Sir Peter John Derham | For service as an innovator in tourism development, commerce and science, to the community and to the preservation of heritage sites in Antarctica | |
| Maxwell William Moore-Wilton | For service to the community through the development and implementation of policy for economic prosperity and as a catalyst for major changes in public administration and service delivery | |
| Professor John Rodney Niland AO | For leadership in the advancement of Australia's universities, for enhancing the development and transmission of knowledge and innovation, and for service to the broader community through the Garvan Institute and St Vincent's Hospital, Sydney | |
| Emeritus Professor Robert Porter | For excellence and achievement in medicine as an internationally renowned neuroscientist and for major contributions to the management of medical research and medical education | |
| The Right Honourable Ian McCahon Sinclair | For distinguished service to the Australian Parliament and to the community, particularly through promoting the expansion of opportunities for those in rural, regional and remote areas of Australia | |
| Professor Russell Walker Strong, CMG RFD | For service to medicine as a pioneer in the development of new techniques and improved clinical performance in the field of liver transplant surgery and to advancing world knowledge in this area | |

==== Military Division ====
| Branch | Recipient | Citation | Notes |
|---|---|---|---|
| Navy | Admiral Christopher Alexander Barrie, RAN | For eminent service to the Australian Defence Force as Chief of the Defence Force | |

=== Officer (AO) ===
==== General Division ====
| Recipient | Citation | Notes |
|---|---|---|
| Albert Henry Royce Abbey, AM DCM | For service to the community, particularly through the Rotary Foundation's support for health and humanitarian projects in overseas countries, and through programmes aimed at providing funding for health care and research facilities | |
| Robert Otto Albert, AM RFD RD | For service to the community through programmes providing support for charitable projects, cultural activities and educational institutions, and to the preservation of Australia's maritime heritage | |
| Professor David George Beanland | For service to education, particularly in the areas of teaching, research and academic leadership, to electronic engineering and microelectronics research, and to the community | |
| Dr Kenneth George Boston | For service to educational administration, particularly as Director-General of the NSW Education Department and managing director of Technical and Further Education, and as a leader in the development of education policy in Australia | |
| The Honourable Thomas James Burns | For service to the Queensland Parliament, particularly in the areas of local government and rural affairs, to the promotion of Australia-China relations, and to community organisations | |
| Dr Ian Francis Bell Common | For service to entomology, particularly the study of Lepidoptera insect pests, their effects on agriculture and the development of adequate controls, and to community education through the publication of books dealing with insects and their role in the environment | |
| Shirley Barbara de la Hunty, MBE | For service to the community, particularly in the areas of conservation, the environment and local government, and to athletics as an athlete, coach and administrator | |
| The Honourable Gareth John Evans, QC | For service to the Australian Parliament, particularly through advancing Australia's foreign policy and trade interests, especially in Asia and through the United Nations | |
| The Most Reverend Ian Gordon Combe George, AM | For service to the Anglican Church, to ecumenism and to the community through engagement in social policy issues and international relief work overseas | |
| The Most Reverend Richard Henry Goodhew | For service to the Anglican Church and to the community, particularly in the areas of education, reconciliation between white and indigenous communities, overseas aid and the value of maintaining strong family life | |
| Professor Michael Samuel Gracey | For service to medicine in the field of paediatric gastroenterology, particularly in relation to Aboriginal health, and to research, teaching and policy development | |
| Barry Joseph Grear, AM | For service to the engineering profession, particularly through the Institution of Engineers, Australia, and in the area of education, and to the community through sporting, church and emergency services organisations | |
| Eric Jack Hayes | For service to business and commerce, particularly in the areas of tourism and hospitality, and to the community through support for a range of educational, medical research and social welfare organisations | |
| Dr Paul Herbert Hopkins | For service in the field of rehabilitation medicine and to the community, particularly children with physical disabilities | |
| Professor John Stephen Horvath | For service to medicine, particularly in the field of hypertension, as a consultant physician and a clinical tutor of medicine, and to medical administration | |
| Alistair Ian Kingswell Lloyd, RFD ED | For service to the pharmacy profession and patient care through integration of pharmacy, medical and nursing services, and for improving labelling on medications and standardising prescription conventions | |
| George Frederick Maltby | For service to pioneering work in telecommunications through the development of services and technologies, particularly the establishment of optical fibre submarine cable and direct dial international call networks, and to libraries and education | |
| Professor Constantine Agapitos Michael, AM | For service to medicine, particularly in the field of obstetrics and gynaecology, as a contributor to the administration of the profession nationally and internationally, and to medical education | |
| Janet Hailes Michelmore | For service to women, particularly through education campaigns to raise public awareness of women's health issues and services provided by the Jean Hailes Foundation | |
| Dr John Craze Henry Morris, MBE | For service to medicine, particularly as a consultant physician, and to the community through educational, medical research and social welfare organisations | |
| Professor John Edgar de Burgh Norman | For service to dentistry and medicine as a maxillofacial surgeon, and to education | |
| John Henry Olsen, OBE | For service to the visual arts as a painter and graphic artist, and in the area of arts administration | |
| Charles Henry Perkins | For service to primary industry, particularly as a leader and researcher in farm management practices and the new utilisation of grain, to tertiary education, and to the community | |
| Penelope Anne Wensley | For service to the development of Australia's international relations, particularly through the Department of Foreign Affairs and Trade | |

==== Military Division ====
| Branch | Recipient | Citation | Notes |
|---|---|---|---|
| Navy | Rear Admiral Christopher Angus Ritchie | For distinguished service to the Australian Defence Force and the Royal Australian Navy as the Maritime Commander Australia, Deputy Chief of Navy and Head Capability Systems | |
| Air Force | Air Vice Marshal Alan William Titheridge, AM | For distinguished service to the Royal Australian Air Force as the Air Commander Australia and Deputy Chief of Air Force | |

=== Member (AM) ===
==== General Division ====
| Recipient | Citation | Notes |
|---|---|---|
| Edward George Anson | For service to the Australian maritime industry, particularly through the implementation of industry reforms | |
| Dr Leila Valerie Asche | For service to science, particularly in the field of microbiology, and to the community of the Northern Territory | |
| Professor John Albyn Ballinger | For service to architecture, particularly in the development of solar energy use and solar efficient design | |
| Dr Allan Francis Murray Barton | For service to the environment through the development of industrial uses for eucalyptus oil and recognition of the role of large-scale eucalyptus plantings in the rehabilitation of saline affected soils | |
| Lorraine Daphne Bayly | For service to the community and charitable organisations through the entertainment industry | |
| Heinrich Thomas Becker | For service to the community, particularly through the Epilepsy Association of South Australia, organisations for people with disabilities and youth sports clubs, and to the South Australian Parliament | |
| Dr John Langtree Black | For service to animal science, particularly in the field of livestock nutrition research, and to the community through bushfire control and sporting organisations | |
| Professor Anthony John Dyson Blake | For service to higher education, particularly in the administration and development of the University of Technology, Sydney, to international co-operation in education, and to indigenous education | |
| Dorothy Pearl Braxton | For service to adult education, particularly through the University of the Third Age and development of U3A Online | |
| Stephanie Britton | For service to the arts, particularly as founder and editor of Artlink magazine, and as an advocate for women, indigenous art and the visual arts | |
| John Brockwell | For service to research in the field of rhizobium ecology and its application to pasture, grain and oilseed legumes, and to promotion of the game of bridge | |
| Lady Jean Brodie-Hall | For service to conservation and the environment, particularly through the development of techniques for landscape planning in arid areas, and to professional development through the Australian Institute of Landscape Architects | |
| William Cyril Brown | For service to people with disabilities, particularly through the Spina Bifida Association of Tasmania and Tasmanians with Disabilities | |
| Kenneth Maxwell Brown | For service to the development of public sector policies and infrastructure programmes in the areas of tourism, sport and recreation, the hospitality industry and racing in New South Wales | |
| Dr Douglas Ian Bryden | For service to veterinary science, particularly in the fields of continuing education and clinical practice through the University of Sydney Post Graduate Foundation | |
| Julian Lillis Campbell | For service to local government and the community of Warren, and to the conservation and management of the environment in the Macquarie River and Marshes area | |
| William Ranald Macpherson Chandler | For service to the community, particularly the preservation of Australia's rural heritage through the Australian Stockman's Hall of Fame and Outback Heritage Centre | |
| Martyn David Chapman | For service to architecture, particularly the development of standards and procedures in architectural practice, contract administration, education and arbitration | |
| Peter Geoffrey Clemenger | For service to the promotion of business and commerce in Melbourne, to the development of tourism, and to the community, particularly as a supporter of the arts and programmes for youth at risk | |
| William John Coad | For service to the community in the regulatory and law enforcement arena, particularly as a contributor to the establishment and development of relevant monitoring authorities | |
| The Honourable Geoffrey Phillip Connard | For service to medical administration and to the community, particularly through health care and medical research institutions | |
| Megan Alexander Cornelius | For service to the development of Australia's information industries as an educator in information technology, and as an advocate for the development of 'world-best' standards to promote productivity and economic development | |
| Pastor Oswald Cruse, MBE | For service to the indigenous community, particularly in the areas of social justice, spiritual welfare, health and land rights | |
| Dr Gabriel Thomas Dadour | For service to the community of Subiaco, particularly as a general practitioner, to local government and to the Western Australian Parliament | |
| Mary Eileen Davidson | For service as a pioneer in the social work profession, particularly in the area of education, and through the development of professional and community welfare organisations | |
| Keith Davis | For service to youth and to international relations, particularly through the Youth Exchange Program of Lions International | |
| John William Downer | For service to engineering and international trade through the development of export opportunities for Australian services and products in South East Asia | |
| Dorothy Durrant | For service to the preservation and recording of colonial heritage, particularly in the Quirindi region as an author and archivist, to youth through the Guiding movement, and to the community | |
| Dr Peter Geoffrey Edwards | For service to the recording of Australia's military history as General Editor of 'The Official History of Australia's Involvement in Southeast Asian Conflicts 1948-1975', and as principal author of the two volumes relating to strategy, diplomacy and home front issues | |
| Sheikh Fehmi Naji El-Imam | For service to multiculturalism and to the Muslim community, particularly through the promotion of community harmony and tolerance and to multi-faith understanding | |
| Ronald William Evans | For service to engineering and to the Australian construction industry, particularly through developments in the area of civil engineering contracting | |
| Bruce Peter Fadelli | For service to the development of business relations between Australia and Indonesia | |
| Douglas Fairclough | For service to local government at local, regional and state levels, to the community, and to youth, particularly through the Narrogin Residential College and in the area of juvenile justice | |
| Jenifer Ann Farmer | For service to education, particularly in the field of adult literacy, through the development of training programmes, resource management, curriculum development and administration, and expansion of the service into regional and rural areas | |
| Laurence Stephen Freedman | For service to the community, particularly as a supporter of medical research and arts organisations, and to business and investment in Australia | |
| Valerie Thelma French | For service to the aged, particularly through the organisation Older People Speak Out, to the community as an advocate for social change, welfare reform, expansion of educational opportunities and human rights, and to journalism | |
| Bernadette Catherine Giambazi | For service to the child care industry through contributing to the development of accreditation processes, regulations, quality standards and training courses, and to the Childcare Association of WA and the Australian Federation of Child Care Centres | |
| Laurence Geoffrey Glanfield | For service to the law, particularly through the development and implementation of policy for legal reform, and for improving community access to a more just and equitable legal system | |
| Dr Rupert Douglas Goodman | For service to the community, particularly through the Queensland Branch of the Australian National Flag Association, to the recording of Australian military and medical history, to youth and to education | |
| Dr Robert Langley Guerin | For service to medicine in the field of otolaryngology, particularly in the areas of clinical practice, education, professional development and indigenous aural health | |
| Professor Elery Hamilton-Smith | For service to conservation and the environment, particularly in the areas of national park, wilderness, cave and karst management, to the development of leisure and recreation activities, and to the community as a contributor to social policy development and through programmes dealing with youth issues | |
| Bruce Vincent Hanrahan | For service to the Macarthur region, particularly through organisations promoting employment generation and job placement opportunities, and to the community through a range of educational and social welfare groups | |
| Barry Ferguson Harvey | For service to the meat industry, particularly in the areas of processing, storage and export, and to the community of Wyndham through organisations concerned with industrial development, urban beautification and transport | |
| Virginia Graham Henderson | For service to cultural life in Australia as an advocate and patron of the performing arts | |
| Dr John Robert Hewson | For service to business and economics, to the Australian Parliament and politics, and to the community | |
| Shirley Ann Hocking | For service to local government and to the community of Narrandera, particularly through leadership in health and aged care, tourism and ex-Service organisations | |
| Margaret Colleen Hole | For service to the legal profession, particularly in the areas of property law and conveyancing, and as a contributor to public policy issues involving children's rights, drug law reform, women in the legal profession and Aboriginal justice | |
| Patricia Anne Horgan | For service to tourism development, particularly in the Margaret River region | |
| Denis Byrne Horgan | For service to tourism development, particularly in the Margaret River region | |
| The Honourable Brian Leslie Howe | For service to the Parliament and people of Australia through policy and legislative reform in the areas of social justice issues, health, and urban development | |
| Dr William Kilpatrick Hunter | For service to medicine, particularly through the Rural Doctors' Association of New South Wales, and to the community of Moree | |
| John Glyde Ingram | For service to education, particularly through the development of Batchelor College into an independent indigenous institute for tertiary education, and to multiculturalism | |
| William Robert Mitchel Irvine | For service to the banking industry and to the community | |
| Walter Ian Harewood Johnston | For service to medicine, particularly in the areas of infertility and reproductive biology, through the development of treatment techniques, pioneering the use of laparoscopy as a diagnostic tool, and the establishment of support and counselling services for patients and their families | |
| Peter Charles Johnstone | For service to youth, particularly through programmes offered by the Lord Somers Camp and Power House, to the community through Rotary International, and to people with disabilities | |
| The Honourable Peter Vernon Jones | For service to the Western Australian Parliament, to the development and management of infrastructure services, and to the community through medical research, cultural and animal welfare organisations | |
| Emeritus Professor Richard Alexander Joske | For service to medicine, particularly in the fields of gastroenterology and hepatology, to medical education through the University of Western Australia and the Royal Australasian College of Physicians, and to the community | |
| The Honourable John Charles Kerin | For service to the Australian Parliament, particularly in the area of government policy and legislative reform relating to primary industry and trade | |
| Sylvia Wallis Simpson Kidziak | For service to community health, particularly to those affected by dust diseases, as a contributor to the development of improved workplace health and safety standards, and through the establishment of associated rehabilitation programmes and compensation measures | |
| James Victor Kimpton | For service to the aviation industry, particularly aircraft manufacturers and assemblers, through revision and rewriting of the Civil Aviation Regulations and chairing of the Program Advisory Panel | |
| Dr Harry Kronenberg | For service to medicine, particularly the expansion of haematology services at the Royal Prince Alfred Hospital, to blood transfusion services, and in the fields of education and professional development | |
| John Laurence Lambert | For service to education, particularly in the area of curriculum development frameworks within New South Wales, and to the Sydney Anglican Schools Corporation | |
| Professor Francis Patrick Larkins | For service to the development of research policy in Australia and the promotion of science and technology at state and national levels, and to education | |
| Jeffrey John Lucy | For service to the accounting profession, particularly through the Institute of Chartered Accountants, to the business sector as an adviser on corporate law and taxation reform, and to the community | |
| Catherine Mary Mapstone | For service to the development of youth, particularly through the Queensland Debating Union, as an adjudicator at state, national and international level and as coach/manager of the Queensland Schools Debating Team | |
| Margaret Helen McKendrick | For service to the community through the Ryder-Cheshire Foundation, particularly the provision of accommodation for families of patients undergoing extended medical treatment and fundraising for overseas humanitarian relief | |
| Dr Gabriele Medley | For service to medicine and women's health through the Victorian Cytology Service, particularly in the field of cervical cytology and pathology, and to the development of pap smear testing, reporting and screening programmes | |
| Professor Glen Stanley Merry | For service to medicine in the fields of neurosurgery and trauma through research and education into the prevention of head injuries, and to surf lifesaving | |
| Graeme Charles Milburn OAM | For service to the community through fundraising for cancer, AIDS research and charities, particularly through participation in and organisation of charity cycle rides in Australia and internationally | |
| Dr Clive Dudley Thomas Minton | For service to ornithology, particularly in the study of migratory wading birds in Australia | |
| The Honourable Athol Randolph Moffitt, CMG, QC | For service to the law through contributions to public debate on drugs, organised crime and war crimes | |
| Professor Wayne Allan John Morrison | For service to medicine, particularly reconstructive plastic surgery, through research and application of microsurgery techniques including innovation into graft tissues | |
| Bryan John Nason | For service to the performing arts in Queensland, through the development of professional theatre groups and regional touring schedules, and through the Grin and Tonic Theatre Troupe | |
| Barry Chisholm Newcomen | For service to primary industry in the East Gippsland region, particularly through the Victorian Farmers Federation, to the community through social support, emergency services and sporting groups, and to local government through the Omeo Shire Council | |
| Daniel Francis Papacek | For service to the citrus industry, particularly through the development of strategies for integrated pest management of horticultural crops | |
| Professor Lester John Peters | For service to medical research, education and clinical practice in the field of radiation oncology, resulting in improved treatments for people with cancer, particularly in the head and neck region | |
| Emeritus Professor Alfred James Pittard | For service to science, particularly microbiology and molecular biology, through research into the control of gene expression in bacteria, and to education as a teacher and administrator | |
| Dr Dragica Popovic | For service to medical administration, particularly as medical director of St Joseph's Hospital, Auburn, and to the medical profession through state medical and health bodies and professional associations | |
| John Lethbridge Potter | For service to the community as an executive member of a range of health care, welfare and cultural organisations, and to sport, particularly tennis and football | |
| Margaret Mary Ralston | For service to amateur and professional sport, particularly in South Australia, as an administrator and journalist | |
| Dr William Regan | For service to medicine, particularly in the fields of dermatopathology and the management of skin cancer, and to the profession through the Australasian College of Dermatologists | |
| Emeritus Professor Gareth Edward Roberts | For service to architectural education, particularly in the fields of urban planning and design, and to the community as a contributor to the development of planning policies | |
| Jeanne Mary Rockey | For service to the community, particularly to children with cancer through the Malcolm Sargent Cancer Fund for Children in Australia and the Starlight Children's Foundation | |
| Margaret Alexandra Rolfe | For service to the decorative arts, particularly as an authority on the history of quilts and quiltmaking, to the promotion of the craft through teaching and writing, and as an adviser on the acquisition of quilts for the national collection | |
| David Bowyer Rosback | For service to the community, particularly through the programmes of Rotary International and Australians Against Child Abuse | |
| Margaret Somerville Ross | For service to the community, particularly through fundraising activities for the programmes of the Baker Medical Research Institute and the Australian War Memorial Foundation, and to education through the Fintona Girls' School | |
| Mary Elizabeth Rummery | For service to the community, particularly through the public health and education sectors | |
| Associate Professor Suzanne Margaret Russell | For service to consumer advocacy, protection and education, particularly regarding food standards, and as a contributor to policy and legislation relating to improving standards and product safety in Australia | |
| Frederic Frank Seeley | For service to Australian industry through the design, development, manufacture and export of evaporative air conditioning units and climate control products, and to the community | |
| Janine Lee Shepherd | For service to the community through inspiring others to strive in circumstances of the greatest difficulty, and through promoting the work of the Australasian Spinal Research Trust in finding a cure for spinal cord injury | |
| Emeritus Professor Lloyd Earle Smythe | For service to science through education and research, particularly the development of the discipline of analytical chemistry in Australia | |
| Constantine Michael Souvlis | For service to the community of Hervey Bay, particularly through the Returned and Services League of Australia and Lions International, and as patron and supporter of groups including emergency services, sporting, cultural and social support | |
| Roderick Paterson Stirling | For service to agriculture in the Darling Downs district, particularly through the introduction of progressive farming technology and innovative irrigation techniques, and to the community | |
| The Honourable Christopher John Sumner | For service to the South Australian Parliament, to the law, particularly establishing basic principles of justice for victims of crime, to multiculturalism and to the National Native Title Tribunal | |
| Dr Steven Vajk Szokolay | For service to architecture, particularly in the development of solar energy use and solar efficient design | |
| Dr Roy Francis Le Cappelaine Taylor | For service to medicine, particularly in the field of ophthalmology as a clinician, teacher and administrator, and to the community | |
| Roderick Thirkell-Johnston | For service to the wool industry, particularly in recognising the need for innovation in agriculture and the textile industry, to the rural sector, particularly in the area of skills training, and to the community | |
| Ruth Tideman | For service to education as the Headmistress of Lauriston Girls' School and providing advancement opportunities for teachers and pupils through the Invergowrie Foundation | |
| Alistair Grant Todd | For service to education as Principal of Scots School, Albury, particularly in the areas of management and leadership, and to the community | |
| Mary Robin Toohey | For service to women, particularly through the National Council of Women of Australia, and to health, service and humanitarian support organisations | |
| Brigid Mary Tracey | For service to the nursing profession, particularly as an administrator and as a contributor to the development of nursing care standards | |
| Professor Terry Fitzgerald Wall | For service to the coal industry as a researcher in the coal sciences, particularly in the technical areas related to coal combustion, and to education | |
| Colonel Eric John Wertheimer, RFD | For service in the field of engineering and the management of construction projects, and to the community, particularly through ex-Service organisations | |
| Associate Professor Richard Hugh West | For service to medicine, particularly as a surgeon and in the area of development of procedures for infection control in clinical surgery, and to education | |
| Kathleen Amelia White | For service to education, particularly in the field of adult literacy, through the NSW Adult Literacy Information Office and the Australian Council for Adult Literacy | |
| Bruce Thomas Worland | For service to the community through youth music groups, particularly through the promotion of music education in schools | |
| Paul Geoffrey Wright | For service to the packaging industry through the innovative design of corrugated cardboard packaging for the shipping and storing of fresh produce | |

==== Military Division ====
| Branch | Recipient | Citation | Notes |
|---|---|---|---|
| Navy | Captain Campbell William Darby, RAN | For exceptional service to the Royal Australian Navy and the Australian Defence Force as a career naval officer | |
| Navy | Commodore Michael Francis Joseph Smith | For exceptional service to the Royal Australian Navy as the Commanding Officer, HMAS Creswell, and Training Authority Initial Training, Leadership and Management | |
| Army | Lieutenant Colonel Alan Stephen Hollings | For exceptional service to the Australian Army in the fields of combat force development and logistics, and as the Chief of Staff, Headquarters Logistic Support | |
| Army | Colonel Stephen Walter Jones | For exceptional service to the Australian Army as the Commanding Officer, Army School of Transport, and Colonel Operational Support, Land Headquarters | |
| Army | Colonel Justin Desmond Kelly | For exceptional service to the Australian Army in the field of Force Development | |
| Army | Brigadier Richard Anthony Lawler | For exceptional service to the Australian Army in the fields of personnel, training and operations as the Director Army Personnel Agency - Perth, Commander 5th Training Group and Commander 13 Brigade | |
| Army | Major General Francis Xavier Roberts | For exceptional service to the Australian Army as the Commander 7th Task Force and Peace Monitoring Group, Operation BEL ISI, Bougainville | |
| Air Force | Wing Commander Godfrey Noel Bradford | For exceptional service to the Royal Australian Air Force in the field of logistics in the combined, joint and single service arenas | |
| Air Force | Squadron Leader Kevin Charles Bruce | For exceptional service to the Royal Australian Air Force as Training Flight Commander, Number 36 and 37 Squadrons, and Senior Pilot C-130J aircraft | |
| Air Force | Group Captain Andrew Edward Kilgour | For exceptional service to the Royal Australian Defence Force in the field of logistics support | |

=== Medal (OAM) ===
==== General Division ====
| Recipient | Citation | Notes |
|---|---|---|
| Brett Aitken | For service to sport as a gold medallist at the Sydney 2000 Olympic Games | |
| William Thomas Aldcroft | For service to the community, particularly in the areas of prisoner rehabilitation and the provision of services for people with addictions | |
| Katie Ruth Allen | For service to sport as a gold medallist at the Sydney 2000 Olympic Games | |
| Kathleen Sheila Anderson | For service to education, and to youth, particularly through Guides Australia and sporting organisations | |
| Marie Jessie Anderson | For service to the communities of Byron Bay and Lennox Head, particularly through the Lennox Head Branch of the Country Women's Association | |
| Elaine Adrienne Andrews | For service to softball as a player, coach and administrator, particularly through the Queensland Softball Association | |
| Jennifer Margaret Armstrong | For service to sport as a gold medallist at the Sydney 2000 Olympic Games | |
| Kieran John Ault-Connell | For service to sport as a gold medallist at the Paralympic Games Sydney 2000 | |
| Earle Wilfred Bailey | For service to the community of the Port Douglas region through local government and tourism, and to the development of the radio and television industries | |
| Marjorie Gladys Baker | For service to social welfare, particularly through 'SIDStasmania', and to the community | |
| Allan Ray Baker | For service to the community, particularly through the Maryborough Neighbourhood Watch Program | |
| Gregory Ian Ball | For service to sport as a gold medallist at the Paralympic Games Sydney 2000 | |
| Paul Barnett | For service to sport as a gold medallist at the Paralympic Games Sydney 2000 | |
| Dr David Edmund Barton | For service to medicine and to the community of Scone | |
| Marjorie Matilda Bates | For service to the community, particularly through the Masters Games, and as a fundraiser for charitable organisations | |
| The Honourable Charles Leo Batt | For service to the community, particularly through Australian Rules football and cricket clubs, to local government, and to the Tasmanian Parliament | |
| Margaret Dorothy Baxendell | For service to the community, particularly through programmes for women, the promotion of healthy lifestyles for the aged and domestic violence prevention | |
| Cedric Harold Bayley Baxendell | For service to the community, particularly through programmes promoting healthy lifestyles for the aged and domestic violence prevention | |
| Alan John Beattie | For service to primary industry through the Far North Queensland Rotary Field Days, and to the community | |
| Leonard Jack Bell | For service to veterans and their families, particularly through the Taroona Ex-Servicemen's Club, and to the community | |
| Robert Noel Bell | For service to veterans through the British Commonwealth Occupation Force Association and the Returned and Services League of Australia | |
| Giuseppe Gaetano Bertinazzo | For service to the Italian community, and to the arts | |
| Stuart David Beveridge | For service to the Australian merino sheep industry, and to the community of Gilgandra | |
| Dr Robert Gregory Birrell | For service to medicine and to children, particularly in identifying the existence of child abuse and raising awareness of the problem among health professionals and in the community | |
| Donald Frederick Blaxell | For service to horticulture, particularly through the Royal Botanic Gardens, Sydney, and the development of gardens at Mount Annan and Mount Tomah | |
| Gwenyth Bolton | For service to the community of the Peats Ridge area, particularly through youth and service groups, and to international humanitarian relief as a supporter of Save the Children | |
| Sebastiano Luigi Bordin | For service to the Italian community of Launceston, particularly the aged and in the area of social welfare | |
| Vladas Juozas Bosikis | For service to the Lithuanian community of Melbourne, particularly in the areas of cultural and social welfare activities | |
| Jennifer Jane Bounds | For service to the community and to cultural life in Penrith and district through the Nepean District Music Club, the Nepean Choral Society and the Penrith Symphony Orchestra | |
| John Murison Bourn | For service to surf lifesaving, particularly through the development of emergency search and rescue services | |
| Cole Milne Bradbury | For service to the community of Taralga through sporting, ex-Service and social support groups | |
| Doreen Ruby Bradley | For service to the community of the Tilligerry Peninsula as a fundraiser for and supporter of sporting, charitable, ex-Service and emergency services groups | |
| Joanne Meryl Bradshaw | For service to sport as a gold medallist at the Paralympic Games Sydney 2000 | |
| Marjorie Joan Bradshaw | For service to the community as a fundraiser through the Australasian Order of Old Bastards | |
| Valenciennes Clare Brealey | For service to the community of Milton, particularly through the Sarah Claydon Retirement Village | |
| Sidney Walter Briggs | For service to the community of Young, particularly through the administration of health and aged care facilities, to veterans and their families, and to the Young Shire Band | |
| Owen Charles Brown | For service to the automotive retail industry, and to the community, particularly through Lions International | |
| Barry George Bullivant | For service to the community, particularly through the preservation of the history of Granville and Western Sydney, and through the Rotary Club of Granville | |
| Essie Agnes Burbridge | For service to the community of Footscray | |
| Maxwell Edward William Burman | For service to youth through the Scouting movement | |
| Lauren Chantel Burns | For service to sport as a gold medallist at the Sydney 2000 Olympic Games | |
| Squadron Leader Michael Arthur Butcher | For service to music, particularly through community bands | |
| Elizabeth Mary Butt | For service to education, particularly through the independent schools sector, and to the community through cultural and charitable groups | |
| Ashley John Callus | For service to sport as a gold medallist at the Sydney 2000 Olympic Games | |
| Robert Gordon Cameron | For service to ornithology, particularly through the Victorian Ornithological Research Group, and to veterans through the 34th Australian Heavy Anti-Aircraft Association | |
| Malcolm David Campbell | For service to the community of Rutherglen as a viticulturist and through involvement with tourism promotion, emergency services and health organisations | |
| Beth Dean Carell | For service to the indigenous arts, particularly as a dancer, choreographer, writer, lecturer and critic | |
| Merle Carr | For service to the community, particularly through the Country Women's Association, the Australian Red Cross and the Rochester and District Hospital Auxiliary | |
| Colin James Carson | For service to the community, particularly through the provision of residential aged care facilities in the Gosnells district | |
| Kevin Meredith Carton | For service to the tourism industry in Western Australia, and to hockey | |
| Naomi Sandra Castle | For service to sport as a gold medallist at the Sydney 2000 Olympic Games | |
| Kenneth William Catchpole | For service to Rugby Union football, and to the community | |
| Shelagh Mary Champion | For service to the community, particularly through the research and documentation of the history of the Manly, Warringah and Pittwater areas, and to the preservation of the environment through the Upper Middle Harbour Conservation Society | |
| George Annells Champion | For service to the community, particularly through the research and documentation of the history of the Manly, Warringah and Pittwater areas, and to the preservation of the environment through the Upper Middle Harbour Conservation Society | |
| Richard Robert Chapman | For service to the community, particularly through the Fairfield Lions Club, and to baseball as an umpire | |
| Bret Christian | For service to the community of Perth through the establishment and continued publication of suburban newspapers | |
| Barbara Mary Clancy | For service to the welfare of children as a foster parent | |
| Annie Clare | For service to education through the development of volunteer literacy programmes for children with dyslexia and other learning difficulties | |
| Stanley Clark | For service to people with diabetes through the development of a portable blood glucose monitor | |
| Stanley Kevin Clarke | For service to veterans and their families, particularly through the Returned and Services League of Australia, and to the community | |
| Paul Clohessy | For service to sport as a gold medallist at the Paralympic Games Sydney 2000 | |
| Carmela Clusker | For service to the community, particularly as a foster carer for children with disabilities | |
| Anthony Terence Cocks | For service to the community, particularly through Vision Australia and Rotary International | |
| Godfrey Abraham Cohen | For service to the community, particularly through the Myra and Godfrey Cohen Family Charitable Trust and the Melbourne Jewish Orphan and Children's Aid Society | |
| Jill Patricia Colley | For service to the community, particularly through the Woodlands Anglican School | |
| William John Conn | For service to the community, particularly through the Royal Children's Hospital Foundation, and to the arts | |
| Robyn Louise Cook | For service to people with disabilities, particularly through the Special Olympics movement | |
| Natalie Louise Cook | For service to sport as a gold medallist at the Sydney 2000 Olympic Games | |
| Dr Robert Robin Arthur Cooke | For service to medicine and medical education, particularly in the field of pathology | |
| Emeritus Professor Hugh Martin Cooper | For service to music, particularly through the Sydney Mozart Society, and to the community through sporting and youth organisations | |
| Elizabeth Ellen Cooper | For service to the community, and to local government through the Victor Harbor City Council | |
| Melville Lyle Courtney | For service to the community through the collection and supply of red back spider specimens for the production of antivenoms by the Commonwealth Serum Laboratories | |
| Bert Craig | For service to the community of South West Rocks through a range of cultural, health, aged care and school groups | |
| John Andrew Crawford | For service to the community within the East Gippsland area, particularly through the 1997 Rotary International Fodder Appeal | |
| Lindsay Dinham Crawford | For service to the community, particularly through the Youth Hostels Association in Victoria | |
| Paul Damien Cross | For service to sport as a gold medallist at the Paralympic Games Sydney 2000 | |
| Douglas Derek Aloysius Crossin | For service to veterans and their families through the Glenorchy Sub-Branch of the Returned and Services League of Australia, and to the community | |
| Francis Raymond Crump | For service to the community of Moree through emergency services, sporting, youth and social welfare groups | |
| Leonard John Cuell | For service to the community, particularly through the Manning District Cancer Action Group | |
| Nancye Yvonne Cullimore | For service to the community, particularly through Meals on Wheels and the Caloundra Committee of Services to the Ageing | |
| Joan Catherine Cunningham | For service to the Tasmanian Parliament | |
| Leila Gladys Daniel | For service to people with disabilities, particularly through the Queensland Blind Bowlers Association | |
| Diana Norma Darlington | For service to education, particularly in the establishment of the St Peter's Anglican Primary School and the Broughton Anglican College at Campbelltown | |
| Dennis Milner Debenham | For service to Rugby Union football, particularly through the Queanbeyan Rugby Union Club | |
| Dulcie Clare Debreceny | For service to the community of Comboyne through agricultural show societies, sporting clubs and the Country Women's Association | |
| Dr Peter Dewey | For service to the community of Wagga Wagga as an orthopaedic surgeon | |
| Dr Bruce Hunter Dolman | For service to the community of Coffs Harbour as a general practitioner and through a range of professional, service and health organisations | |
| Patrick Donachie | For service to sport as a gold medallist at the Paralympic Games Sydney 2000 | |
| William Cecil Donaldson | For service to the community of Toronto and district, particularly the welfare of veterans through the Toronto Sub-Branch of the Returned and Services League of Australia | |
| Stewart Michael Doyle | For service to cycling, and to the community | |
| Commander Hugh Kelvin Duncan, RAN | For service to the community of the Australian Capital Territory, particularly through the Royal National Capital Agricultural Society and sporting organisations | |
| Pamela Bennett Dunn | For service to youth in the Illawarra region, particularly through education in drama and theatre | |
| Jamie Barry Dunross | For service to sport as a gold medallist at the Paralympic Games Sydney 2000 | |
| Glenys Elizabeth Dunstan | For service to the welfare of children as a foster parent | |
| Mary Veronica Dwyer | For service to the community, particularly as a fundraiser for schools, parish and community organisations | |
| Stephen Robert Eaton | For service to sport as a gold medallist at the Paralympic Games Sydney 2000 | |
| The Very Reverend Father Tadros El-Bakhoumi | For service to the Coptic community, particularly through the Coptic Orthodox Church in Australia | |
| Percival Alwyn Ellis | For service to the community, particularly through the Royal Agricultural Show Society of the Northern Territory and as an umpire for Australian Rules football | |
| Alice Joyce England | For service to the community of Maroochydore, particularly to veterans, war widows and their dependants | |
| Wendy Lynette Escott | For service to people with disabilities, particularly through the establishment of arts programmes for children and adults | |
| William Russell Evans | For service to the aviation industry, particularly through pilot training and certification | |
| Robert Edward Ray Everett | For service to industry, particularly in the areas of quality control and non-destructive testing, and establishing standards for these practices | |
| Errel Lorene Fagan | For service to the community through the Parramatta Life Line Care Project | |
| Christopher Malcolm Fagg | For service to the community, particularly through emergency services organisations and the Australian Army Cadet Corps | |
| Simon John Fairweather | For service to sport as a gold medallist at the Sydney 2000 Olympic Games | |
| Kevin John Faulkner | For service to the community of St Marys through business, social support and sporting organisations | |
| Rebecca Elizabeth Feldman | For service to sport as a gold medallist at the Paralympic Games Sydney 2000 | |
| Colin George Fereday | For service to the community of the Australian Capital Territory, particularly through the Ryder-Cheshire Foundation, the RAAF Association and Neighbourhood Watch | |
| James Andrew Ferguson | For service to education, particularly through the South Australian Secondary Principals Association and the Secondary Schools Sports Association of South Australia | |
| Dr John Peter Feros | For service to the community, particularly through the programmes of Rotary International, and to medicine as a general practitioner | |
| Wendy Helen Field | For service to the welfare of children as a foster parent | |
| Commander John Frederick Fielding, RAN | For service to the community, particularly the welfare of veterans and their families | |
| James Patrick Joseph Fitzgerald, ED | For service to the community, particularly to veterans and their families through the Auburn RSL Day Care Club | |
| Arthur Noel Flanagan | For service to the communities of Murwillumbah and Tweed Heads, particularly through ex-Service and youth organisations | |
| John Allan Clarke Forbes | For service to the community, particularly as a fundraiser for the Victoria Police Blue Ribbon Foundation | |
| Geoffrey Gavin Ford | For service to the arts, particularly the study of early Australian pottery, and to the community | |
| Dr Thomas John Forgan | For service to science and technology through the establishment of the Australian Technology Park | |
| Kevin Norman Foster | For service to the community through the Scouting and Masonic movements | |
| Joanne Kylie Fox | For service to sport as a gold medallist at the Sydney 2000 Olympic Games | |
| Heath Wesley Francis | For service to sport as a gold medallist at the Paralympic Games Sydney 2000 | |
| Catherine Astrid Salome Freeman | For service to sport, particularly athletics | |
| Margaret Cameron Freemantle | For service to the welfare of children and families, through the organisation of local support services and the administration of family day care programmes in the Hamilton area | |
| Alan James Frost | For service to education, particularly as a teacher at St Paul's School | |
| Gordon Barrington Fry | For service to youth, particularly through the Scouting movement | |
| Mirko Furjanic | For service to the Croatian community, particularly through the Australian-Croatian Club in Glenorchy and the Croatian Soccer Association of Australia | |
| Christopher John Fydler | For service to sport as a gold medallist at the Sydney 2000 Olympic Games | |
| Lieutenant Colonel Rodney Charles Gabriel MBE | For service to the welfare of veterans through the Gull Force Association and the 6th Battalion Association, and to the people of Ambon | |
| Dr John Paul Gallagher | For service to medicine, to the community, particularly in the areas of social welfare and aged care, and to people with disabilities | |
| Rex Albert Gardam | For service to the community, particularly through the Burnie Agricultural and Pastoral Society's Animal Nursery | |
| Maurice John Garment | For service to the community, particularly through the Western Group of Show Societies and the Evans Shire Bush Fire Brigade | |
| Ronald Gaw | For service to youth in Mackay, particularly through the Kalyan Youth Service | |
| Iris Irene Gerard | For service to the community of Townsville through Meals on Wheels | |
| James Hugh Gibson | For service to the community of Mount Eliza, and to overseas aid | |
| Marilyn Kay Gilbertson | For service to education, particularly through the Australian Primary Principals Association | |
| Judith Maree Gittoes | For service to the aged in the Tweed Heads area, particularly through Meals on Wheels | |
| The Reverend Father Paul Aloysius Glynn | For service to the Catholic Church, and to furthering Australia-Japan relations | |
| Maxine Anne Goulding | For service to the community, particularly through the provision of professional public relations expertise for volunteer organisations | |
| Kenneth Leslie Graham | For service to rowing, particularly through the Sydney Rowing Club | |
| Matthew Douglas Gray | For service to sport as a gold medallist at the Paralympic Games Sydney 2000 | |
| Nancy Gray | For service to the communities of Borambil and Quirindi, particularly in the fields of local and family history | |
| Isabella Frances Green | For service to people with disabilities through the Riding for the Disabled Association of Victoria | |
| Judith-Lee Alice Green | For service to sport as a gold medallist at the Paralympic Games Sydney 2000 | |
| Colin Laurence Grey | For service to the community, particularly through the B-24 Liberator Memorial Restoration Fund Inc | |
| Adrian Paul Grogan | For service to sport as a gold medallist at the Paralympic Games Sydney 2000 | |
| Bridgette Marie Gusterson | For service to sport as a gold medallist at the Sydney 2000 Olympic Games | |
| Grant Hackett | For service to sport as a gold medallist at the Sydney 2000 Olympic Games | |
| Norbert Hagel | For service to veterans and their families, particularly through the ACT Advocacy and Advice Service and the Far North Queensland TPI Association | |
| David Robert Hall | For service to sport as a gold medallist at the Sydney 2000 Paralympic Games | |
| John Murray Hall | For service to youth, particularly through the Brisbane Anglican Church Grammar School, and to the community | |
| Simone Lorraine Hankin | For service to sport as a gold medallist at the Sydney 2000 Olympic Games | |
| Pamela Joy Hanna | For service to youth in the Lugarno and Peakhurst areas | |
| Brendan Percival Hansen | For service to the community of Maryborough, particularly through the Maryborough and District Housing Action group and the Scouting movement | |
| Darren Harry | For service to sport as a gold medallist at the Paralympic Games Sydney 2000 | |
| Arthur Herbert Hawkins | For service to youth, particularly through the Scouting movement, and to the community through dog obedience training | |
| Heather Margaret Haynes | For service to the community of the Gold Coast, particularly as a fundraiser for charities | |
| Theresa Lindsay Hayward | For service to the community, particularly as a social worker in the care of children and their families, and as an advocate for their needs and rights | |
| Reginald John Heading | For service to the community, particularly through the Whyalla Show Society, service organisations and sporting clubs | |
| Dr Herbert Paul Henningham | For service to the community, particularly through Rotary International | |
| Julie Elizabeth Higgins | For service to sport as a gold medallist at the Paralympic Games Sydney 2000 | |
| Yvette Oonna Higgins | For service to sport as a gold medallist at the Sydney 2000 Olympic Games | |
| Marlene June Hobbs | For service to the communities of Doveton and Hallam, particularly through service and welfare organisations | |
| Kate Jon-Marie Hooper | For service to sport as a gold medallist at the Sydney 2000 Olympic Games | |
| Cletus Maria Hooper | For service to the community through social welfare and counselling activities, particularly at Catherine House in Adelaide | |
| Alan Murray Horsburgh | For service to horse racing in Victoria, and to the community through charitable, educational and sporting groups | |
| Joyce Mary Hossack | For service to the aged, particularly the development of health care standards in residential hostels, and to veterans | |
| Nicole Elaine Hudson | For service to sport as a gold medallist at the Sydney 2000 Olympic Games | |
| Desmond Barry Robert Hurst | For service to the community of Moree, particularly through the New South Wales State Emergency Service | |
| Rachel Anne Imison | For service to sport as a gold medallist at the Sydney 2000 Olympic Games | |
| Margaret Joan Jack | For service to the preservation of local history, particularly through the Bendigo Dragon Museum, and to the community | |
| Royce Alwyn Jackson | For service to surf lifesaving, particularly in Newcastle | |
| Neville Menzies Jackson | For service to the community of Rochester, and to veterans, particularly through the Returned and Services League of Australia | |
| Patricia Willis Jaffe | For service to the community, particularly through the Victorian Division of the Duke of Edinburgh's Award and Relationships Australia | |
| Bernice Elizabeth Jensen | For service to the community of the Hunter Valley, particularly through the John Hunter Hospital Kookaburra Carers Auxiliary | |
| Gweneth Daphne Johnson | For service to recreational activities, particularly contract bridge as a teacher and promoter of the game | |
| Angus George Johnson | For service to the environment, particularly through Men of the Trees in the areas of seed collection and propagation for revegetation projects | |
| Marjorie Johnstone | For service to people with motor neurone disease and other neurological disorders, particularly as a fundraiser for the Brain Foundation (WA) Ltd | |
| June Beryl Jones | For service to the community of Moreton Island, particularly through the provision of first aid services | |
| Benjamin Boaz Joyner | For service to the communities of the Gold Coast, particularly through service and community support organisations, and to children as a toymaker | |
| Lydia Dora Kalleske | For service to the Aboriginal community of Areyonga | |
| Hannelore Kaltenbach | For service to children and adults with disabilities, particularly through the Warrah School at Dural | |
| John Matthew Kearney | For service to the Lake Macquarie and Newcastle areas, particularly through Meals on Wheels and the Society of St Vincent de Paul and for appearances as Santa Claus | |
| The Reverend Father Edward Philip Kennedy | For service to the Aboriginal community of Redfern, particularly through the provision of housing and medical services | |
| Ian John Kennett | For service to the welfare of veterans and their families, particularly through the Returned and Services League of Australia, and to the community | |
| Patrick Mortimer Kerrins | For service to the community of Tatura, particularly through sporting clubs and associations | |
| Thomas Jack King | For service to sport as a gold medallist at the Sydney 2000 Olympic Games | |
| Shirley King | For service to the community, particularly through Zonta International and the Australian Association of Lyceum Clubs | |
| William Ashley Kirby | For service to sport as a gold medallist at the Sydney 2000 Olympic Games | |
| Michael George Klim | For service to sport as a gold medallist at the Sydney 2000 Olympic Games | |
| Daniel Steven Kowalski | For service to sport as a gold medallist at the Sydney 2000 Olympic Games | |
| Paul John Lake | For service to sport as a gold medallist at the Paralympic Games Sydney 2000 | |
| Emmie Law | For service to the community as a teacher of highland dancing and pipe music, and to the Central Gippsland Highland Dancers and the Central Gippsland Pipe Band | |
| David W Lawler | For service to surf lifesaving and amateur swimming, and to the Australian credit union movement | |
| Andrew Graham Lawson | For service to the Aboriginal communities of the Western Desert | |
| Mark Le Flohic | For service to sport as a gold medallist at the Paralympic Games Sydney 2000 | |
| Claire Theresa Leahy | For service to the community, particularly through The Therry Dramatic Society and The Music Hall Show | |
| Neville Charles Lee | For service to the community, particularly in Camberwell, through local government, the Scouting movement and Rotary International | |
| Sister Mary Clement Lennox | For service to the community of Mudgee, and to the Catholic education system | |
| Lynette Lepore | For service to sport as a gold medallist at the Paralympic Games Sydney 2000 | |
| Maurice Lilienthal | For service to sport, particularly through the New South Wales Country Cricket Association | |
| Dr John Charles Lill | For service to sport administration through the Melbourne Cricket Club and the Melbourne Cricket Ground, and to youth through The Lord's Taverners Australia | |
| Jeanne Little | For service to the community as a fundraiser for charitable and medical research organisations, and to the entertainment industry | |
| David Llewellyn Lloyd | For service to education, particularly through advocacy, the promotion and implementation of community involvement in schools, and in the area of school-based management | |
| Sophie Sandra Lovell | For service to the community of Belgrave and district, particularly through social support, aged care, women's and youth groups | |
| Julianna Lowy | For service to the Jewish community, and to the support of charitable organisations | |
| Esme Jean Luck | For service to the community of Mount Barker and district, particularly in the area of aged welfare | |
| Albert Peter Luks | For service to the Latvian community, particularly through the Latvian Relief Society 'Daugavas Vanagi' | |
| Peggy Hilda May Maple | For service to the community, particularly through the Glen Waverley Secondary College Library | |
| Peter David Marshman | For service to the community, particularly as the founder of Youth Opportunities Association SA Inc | |
| Graeme Martin | For service to sport as a gold medallist at the Paralympic Games Sydney 2000 | |
| Wallace Mausolf | For service to the community, particularly through the Noarlunga Primary School and the Anglican Church | |
| Browyn Lee Mayer | For service to sport as a gold medallist at the Sydney 2000 Olympic Games | |
| Margaret Ruth McCarthy | For service to international relations and overseas aid through Care Australia | |
| William David McClintock | For service to education, particularly in the western regions of Queensland, through the provision of support and professional guidance | |
| Melva Florence McDonald | For service to the communities of Rooty Hill and Mt Druitt, particularly through charitable organisations | |
| Captain Ralph John Francis McDonell | For service to the preservation of Australia's maritime history, particularly through the restoration of historic vessels and as an author | |
| Thomas Maxwell McGee | For service to veterans and their families, particularly through the Greenbank RSL Services Club | |
| Scott Anthony McGrory | For service to sport as a gold medallist at the Sydney 2000 Olympic Games | |
| Cecily Ruth McGuire | For service to the community of Manjimup, particularly through aged welfare, health and sporting organisations | |
| Lisa McIntosh | For service to sport as a gold medallist at the Paralympic Games Sydney 2000 | |
| The Honourable Fred Evan McKenzie | For service to the community in the Belmont area, particularly through support for aged care and charitable organisations | |
| Gwen Barton McWilliam | For service to the community of Hawthorn and district, particularly through the research, documentation and publication of its history | |
| Brian Victor Menzel | For service to the community of Hahndorf, particularly in the construction and maintenance of public sporting and civic facilities | |
| Barbara Elizabeth Mettam | For service to music education as a teacher and administrator | |
| Gail Louise Miller | For service to sport as a gold medallist at the Sydney 2000 Olympic Games | |
| Natalie Rona Miller | For service to the Australian film industry, particularly the production, distribution and exhibition of quality film | |
| Melissa Ann Mills | For service to sport as a gold medallist at the Sydney 2000 Olympic Games | |
| Paul Graham Frederick Mitchell | For service to sport as a gold medallist at the Paralympic Games Sydney 2000 | |
| Claire Mitchell-Taverner | For service to sport as a gold medallist at the Sydney 2000 Olympic Games | |
| Tania Modra | For service to sport as a gold medallist at the Paralympic Games Sydney 2000 | |
| Doris Eva Mohl | For service to the community through the Citizens' Advice Bureau and the University of the Third Age, and to the arts | |
| Luciano Renaldo Molina | For service to the restaurant industry in Melbourne, and to motor sports | |
| Gwendoline Agnes Moloney | For service to the community of Thursday Island, particularly as the Editor of The Torres News | |
| Dorothy May Moore | For service to the community, particularly through the Australian Capital Territory Branch of the National Trust | |
| Michael Morahan | For service to the community through the preservation and recording of Australia's railway heritage | |
| John William Moran | For service to the furniture industry, particularly in the areas of manufacturing and training, and to the community | |
| Robert Charles Morell | For service to rowing, particularly in the development of masters' rowing as a coach and administrator | |
| Jack Victor Mudie | For service to furthering relations between Australia and Japan through the development of the Prisoner of War Memorial and Peace Park at Naoetsu | |
| Lyn Nixon | For service to sport as a gold medallist at the Paralympic Games Sydney 2000 | |
| Anthony Gerard Nolan | For service to the communities of Lane Cove and Willoughby, particularly through the promotion of community safety and crime prevention | |
| Gwendolyn Frances Norris | For service to the community, particularly through the organisation and teaching of square dancing in the Kempsey and Nambucca areas | |
| Colin Percival Nowlan | For service to the community of Wallsend and district through ex-Service, charitable and sporting groups | |
| Reginald Frederick Nutley | For service to the welfare of the aged through the Blue Nursing Service Wynnum Centre, and to the community | |
| Sandra Yvonne O'Brien | For service to nursing, particularly in the areas of health planning and policy in rural areas, and as the administrator of the Port Macquarie Base Hospital | |
| Alwyn Francis O'Connor | For service to the trade union movement, particularly through the Construction, Forestry, Mining and Energy Union, and to the community | |
| Robert Thomas O'Hearn | For service to the community, particularly veterans and their families in the Newcastle area | |
| Heather Mary O'Malley | For service to the welfare of children, particularly as a foster parent | |
| Neville David O'Malley | For service to the welfare of children, particularly as a foster parent | |
| Maxwell Arthur Oakley | For service to veterans and their families, particularly through the Lindisfarne Sub-Branch of the Returned and Services League of Australia | |
| Norman Leslie Opie | For service to youth through the Scouting movement, and to the community | |
| Dr Desmond Thomas Parker | For service to education, particularly as the founding Principal of St Paul's Anglican Grammar School at Warragul, and as an educational administrator | |
| Sarnya Marie Parker | For service to sport as a gold medallist at the Paralympic Games Sydney 2000 | |
| Russell John Parsons | For service to youth, particularly as a coach of sporting teams, and to the community of Ouyen | |
| Roslyn Marie Paterson | For service to the Cornish community of South Australia | |
| Siobhan Bethany Paton | For service to sport as a gold medallist at the Paralympic Games Sydney 2000 | |
| Russell Gordon Payne | For service to youth, particularly through the Scouting movement | |
| Todd Robert Pearson | For service to sport as a gold medallist at the Sydney 2000 Olympic Games | |
| Alison Louise Peek | For service to sport as a gold medallist at the Sydney 2000 Olympic Games | |
| Stephen Andrew Pemberton | For service to the community of Great Lakes | |
| Phyllis Marion Pepper | For service to the community, particularly through the Gosnells Community Support Service and the Addie Mills Senior Citizens' Centre | |
| George Henry John Phillips | For service to the community of the Australian Capital Territory through sporting, church and ex-Service groups | |
| Raymond Kingsley Phippard | For service to the community, particularly the support of medical research through Lions International | |
| Stewart Alan Pike | For service to sport as a gold medallist at the Paralympic Games Sydney 2000 | |
| Adam Robert Pine | For service to sport as a gold medallist at the Sydney 2000 Olympic Games | |
| Peter John Plumridge | For service to the communities of Pascoe Vale and Coburg, particularly through local government, aged care and service organisations | |
| Lynette Ellen Polson | For service to people with hearing impairments, particularly Meniere's disease, and the promotion of the Lions Hearing Dogs programme | |
| Daniel Luke Polson | For service to sport as a gold medallist at the Paralympic Games Sydney 2000 | |
| Joan Lawson Pope | For service to the development of creative arts for children, and to the community | |
| Kerri-Ann Pottharst | For service to sport as a gold medallist at the Sydney 2000 Olympic Games | |
| Maria Victusya Prerauer | For service to cultural life as an arts editor and music critic, and to journalism | |
| Elizabeth Jann Preston | For service in support of the administration of the Australian Consulate-General in Honolulu, Hawaii, and to the organisation of annual ANZAC Day ceremonies | |
| Strathmore George Proudman | For service to the preservation of the craft of stonemasonry, particularly through training courses, and to the restoration and preservation of significant heritage buildings | |
| Glen Richard Quantrelle | For service to the community, particularly through the Child and Family Care Network and Rotary International, and to the Church of Christ | |
| Colonel Donald McInnes Ramsay | For service to youth, particularly through the Commonwealth Day Council, and to international relations through the Australian Papua New Guinea Friendship Association and the Battle for Australia Commemoration Committee | |
| Reginald Cecil Randall | For service to the community of Tocumwal, and to Lions International | |
| John Stanley Read | For service to the welfare of the aged in Lake Macquarie, particularly through the establishment of retirement villages | |
| John Willard Reddin | For service to primary industry, particularly through the Royal Agricultural and Horticultural Society of South Australia as an archivist and historian, and to the potato and sheep industries | |
| Brett Michael Reid | For service to sport as a gold medallist at the Paralympic Games Sydney 2000 | |
| Maxwell Andrew Reynolds | For service to veterans and their families, particularly in the Melville area, and to hockey | |
| Kenneth George Richards | For service to the community, particularly through the Ipswich Branch of the Queensland Cancer Fund | |
| Patricia Gwendoline Richards | For service to youth, particularly through the Scouting movement | |
| Coralie Freda Riordan | For service to the community of Camden through aged care, historical and service groups | |
| Noel Robins | For service to sport as a gold medallist at the Paralympic Games Sydney 2000 | |
| Dale Hartley Robins | For service to youth, particularly through the Scouting movement | |
| Florence Elizabeth Robinson | For service to people with disabilities in Bendigo, particularly through the Peter Harcourt Services Association | |
| Charles Leslie Robinson | For service to people with physical disabilities, particularly through the establishment of training and job placement facilities in the Parramatta region | |
| Stefan Romaniw | For service to education and language learning, particularly through the coordination and provision of services for people from linguistically and culturally diverse backgrounds | |
| Myer Rosenblum | For service to sport, particularly Rugby Union football, hammer throwing and the Maccabi movement, and to the community | |
| Iris Mary Roser | For service to veterans and their families, particularly through the Coolum Peregian Sub-Branch of the Returned and Services League of Australia, and to the community through the Salvation Army | |
| Doreen Anne Ross | For service to the community, particularly through the Schofields Bush Fire Brigade | |
| Austin Timothy Ryan | For service to the rural cropping industry as an inventor of crop farming equipment and through the introduction of innovative growing methods | |
| Frederick Alan Sandell | For service to the community, particularly through the No 8 Elementary Flying Training School Association | |
| Dr Donald Peter Andrew Sands | For service to the horticultural industry in Australia and the Pacific region through the development of biological pest control solutions, and to entomology, particularly through conservation projects | |
| James Kevin Saul | For service to the fishing industry in New South Wales, and to the community | |
| Yvonne Audrey Selby | For service to the community, particularly through the Charlestown Caring Group | |
| Dr Charles Athol Brough Sharpe | For service to medicine, particularly through the Nepal Plastic Surgery Programme | |
| Brian William Sharpe | For service to the community of Gerringong, particularly to the aged through the Mayflower Retirement Village | |
| Margaret Clare Sharpe | For service to the people of Nepal through the Nepal Plastic Surgery Programme | |
| Joyce Gwendoline Shepherd | For service to the community, particularly through the Australian Red Cross and the Country Women's Association | |
| Lionel James Shipway | For service to sailing, particularly through promotion of the Sabot Class and the instruction of juniors, and to junior Rugby Union football | |
| Lorraine Nell Short | For service to swimming, particularly through the Queensland Swimming Association and the Commercial Swimming Club | |
| Ian McHutchison Sim | For service to community history, particularly the preservation and recording of Aboriginal rock art and engraving sites in New South Wales, and to recording material in Yuwaalayaay and other languages | |
| The Honourable David William Simmons | For service to the Australian Parliament, and to the community of the Hunter region | |
| Angela Robyn Skirving | For service to sport as a gold medallist at the Sydney 2000 Olympic Games | |
| Murray Wilfred Slee | For service to local government, and to the community of Shepparton | |
| Barrie Chapman Smith | For service to youth through the Scouting movement, and to the community | |
| Gregory Stephen Smith | For service to sport as a gold medallist at the Paralympic Games Sydney 2000 | |
| Jessie Smith | For service to the community through Friends of the Royal Perth Hospital | |
| William Percival Smith | For service to veterans and their families, particularly through the Woden Valley Sub-Branch of the Returned and Services League of Australia, and to the community | |
| Margery Edith Smyth | For service to the community, particularly through the National Council of Women of Australia, and to the welfare of the aged, war and defence widows and their children | |
| Neil Cameron Soullier | For service to the community, particularly as a fundraiser for the Victoria Police Blue Ribbon Foundation | |
| Andrew Peter Sourry | For service to conservation and the environment, particularly as an advocate for establishing and maintaining national parks and nature reserves in the Gosford area | |
| Sylvia Isabel Soutter | For service to the community, particularly through the Mildura and District Ex-Servicewomen's Association | |
| Bryan James Sowersby | For service to veterans and their families through the 29/46 Australian Infantry Battalion | |
| Henry John Spiers | For service to primary industry, particularly through the South Australian Farmers Federation, and to the community of Hawker and district | |
| Clare Victor Stevens | For service to the communities of Ganmain and Coolamon, particularly through health, volunteer bushfire service and sporting groups | |
| Juris Stilbe | For service to youth, particularly through Tuggerah Lakes Blue Light | |
| Caroline Amelda Stilbe | For service to youth, particularly through Tuggerah Lakes Blue Light | |
| Bermar Sellars Stillwell | For service to the motor and aviation industries, to motor sports, and to the community | |
| Jack Alfred Stirling | For service to the community, particularly through the Abbeyfield Society and service organisations | |
| Kay Stone | For service to the community of Lismore, particularly through Summerland House With No Steps | |
| Belinda Josephine Stowell | For service to sport as a gold medallist at the Sydney 2000 Olympic Games | |
| Timothy Francis Sullivan | For service to sport as a gold medallist at the Paralympic Games Sydney 2000 | |
| Kevin William Swan | For service to primary industry, particularly through the Grain Pool of Western Australia | |
| Henri Szeps | For service to the arts, and to the community through the Australia Day Council and the National Centre for Childhood Grief | |
| Oksana Lubov Tarnawska | For service to the Ukrainian community, particularly through the Ukrainian Catholic Council in Australia, the Ukrainian Scouting group - PLAST, and as musical director of the Ukrainian Cathedral Youth Choir | |
| John Robert Templeton | For service to Australian Rules football, particularly in rural Victoria | |
| Edward Vincent Terry | For service to the community, particularly through the 'Yarns' community artwork project, and to agricultural organisations | |
| Sister Julie Margaret Mary Thomas | For service to the community, particularly as the founder of the Australian Leukodystrophy Support Group Inc | |
| Ian James Thorpe | For service to sport as a gold medallist at the Sydney 2000 Olympic Games | |
| Olive Jean Tindale | For service to the community of Hay through ex-Service, social welfare and charitable organisations | |
| Stuart Brian Tinney | For service to sport as a gold medallist at the Sydney 2000 Olympic Games | |
| Dr John Storrs Howard Tooth | For service to the welfare of the aged, particularly people with dementia | |
| Anne Chana Topelberg | For service to youth through The Queen's Trust for Young Australians (WA), and to the community | |
| Julie Towers | For service to sport as a gold medallist at the Sydney 2000 Olympic Games | |
| Linda Ellen Townsend | For service to the community, particularly ex-Service personnel through the Toukley RSL Women's Auxiliary | |
| Geoffrey Douglas Trappett | For service to sport as a gold medallist at the Paralympic Games Sydney 2000 | |
| Jean Mary Trethewey, RFD | For service to nursing, particularly through the Royal Hobart Hospital, and to the community | |
| Chaplain Eric John Trezise | For service to the community in the areas of suicide prevention and grief counselling | |
| Eric Leslie Trimper | For service to horticulture and floriculture, particularly as the Head Gardener of Ashford Community Hospital and through the National Rose Society of Australia | |
| Mark David Turnbull | For service to sport as a gold medallist at the Sydney 2000 Olympic Games | |
| Janina Vabolis | For service to the Lithuanian community | |
| Dr Reuben John van Velsen | For service to horticultural industries, particularly in the areas of plant health management, research and development, and quarantine practices | |
| Olga Alma Vidler | For service to the community, particularly through the Fingal Head Progress Association | |
| Joseph Damian Wakim | For service to the Arab community and to multiculturalism, particularly through the Australian Arabic Council, and to youth | |
| John Bieler Waldegrave | For service to the community, particularly through health administration in the Hornsby and Ku-ring-gai areas | |
| Dawn Wallace | For service to the arts, particularly through the Friends of the State Opera of South Australia, and to the community | |
| Paul Francis Walsh | For service to the community through the promotion of reconciliation, social justice and welfare in the Newcastle and Hunter regions, particularly through the Novocastrian Tales project and Yallarwah Place | |
| Ronald Fowler Warland | For service to the foundry industry, particularly in New South Wales | |
| Joyce Dorothy Warren | For service to the arts, particularly in the Australian Capital Territory | |
| Dr Judith Ann Wassell | For service to medicine, particularly in the area of women's health in the Gold Coast area through Family Planning Queensland, and to the community | |
| Julia Ann Waterfield | For service to the community, particularly as a volunteer for the activities of Rotary International | |
| William Allan Waterfield | For service to the community, particularly through Rotary International | |
| Deborah Kathleen Watson | For service to sport as a gold medallist at the Sydney 2000 Olympic Games | |
| Thomas Simon Watters | For service to the community of Gordonvale and district, and to the sugar cane industry, particularly through the implementation of farming practices sensitive to the environment | |
| Graham William Wearn | For service to local government, and to the community of the Northern Yorke Peninsula | |
| Elizabeth Jane Weekes | For service to sport as a gold medallist at the Sydney 2000 Olympic Games | |
| Eva Marianna Weinberger | For service to the Jewish community, particularly through promoting awareness of Holocaust issues | |
| Judith Ann Wentzel | For service to music and to young performers through the Sydney North Youth Orchestra, the Jazz Ensemble and the Woodwind Ensemble | |
| Ross Elton Westley | For service to youth and to the community, particularly through Lions International | |
| Leslie Weston | For service to the community of Tarcutta, particularly through ex-Service and sporting groups | |
| Leon James White | For service to indigenous education, particularly through the Yirrakala Homelands School and as a mentor to indigenous educators | |
| Keith Whitsed | For service to the community of Corryong through local government, and through campdrafting, aged care and youth organisations | |
| Samuel Thomas Whyte | For service to ex-Service personnel and their families through the New South Wales Branch of the HMAS Warramunga Veterans Association | |
| Doris Isabel Wilkinson | For service to the community, particularly through the recording of the history of the Upper Clarence River region | |
| Colwyn Benjamin Williams | For service to the community, particularly through the Returned and Services League of Australia | |
| Athol Francis Willoughby | For service to dance as a teacher of classical ballet and through the Cecchetti Society | |
| Carol Anne Wilson | For service to education, and to the Aboriginal communities of Malabugilmah and Baryulgil as an advocate for improved facilities | |
| Stephen Raymond Wilson | For service to sport as a gold medallist at the Paralympic Games Sydney 2000 | |
| Clarence Leo Wilson | For service to veterans and their families through the Queensland Ex-Prisoners of War Association | |
| Kathleen Eleanor Wood | For service to the development of school and community choirs | |
| Danielle Woodhouse | For service to sport as a gold medallist at the Sydney 2000 Olympic Games | |
| Mary Elizabeth Woods | For service to conservation and the environment, particularly through Landcare | |
| Taryn Nadine Woods | For service to sport as a gold medallist at the Sydney 2000 Olympic Games | |
| Carol Edna Youdan | For service to the community through the Royal Society for the Prevention of Cruelty to Animals | |
| Raymond Young | For service to the community of Rockhampton through sporting, youth and service organisations | |
| Maxwell Ian Zell | For service to primary industry, particularly in the development of modern agricultural practices, to local government through the Gilgandra Shire Council, and to the community | |

==== Military Division ====
| Branch | Recipient | Citation | Notes |
|---|---|---|---|
| Navy | Warrant Officer Susan Ann Smith | For meritorious service to the Royal Australian Navy in the field of Sea Training | |
| Army | Major William Adam Bryden | For meritorious service to the Australian Defence Force in the field of Special Operations | |
| Army | Warrant Officer Class One Walter John Gilbert | For meritorious service to the Australian Army as the Company Sergeant Major, Bravo Company, 1st Combat Service Support Battalion, and Regimental Sergeant Major, 4th Brigade Administrative Support Battalion | |
| Army | Captain Bruce William Holmes | For meritorious service to the Australian Defence Force as the Regimental Sergeant Major, Bravo Company, 7th Combat Service Support Battalion and Joint Logistical Unit — North | |
| Army | Warrant Officer Class Two Robert John Knox | For meritorious service to the Australian Army Reserve and the North West Mobile Force as the Squadron Sergeant Major of Kimberley Squadron | |
| Army | Warrant Officer Class One Graeme Vincent Lakey | For meritorious service to the Australian Army as the Regimental Sergeant Major, 1st Field Regiment, and Group Sergeant Major for Operation BEL ISS, Bougainville | |
| Army | Sergeant Leo Leppens | For meritorious service to the Australian Army, particularly during Operation Solace in Somalia, Operation Mazurka in the Sinai and Operation Stabilise in East Timor | |
| Air Force | Warrant Officer Wayne Barrie Patch | For meritorious service to the Royal Australian Air Force in the field of aviation maintenance and logistics | |
