= Ella Spira =

British composer

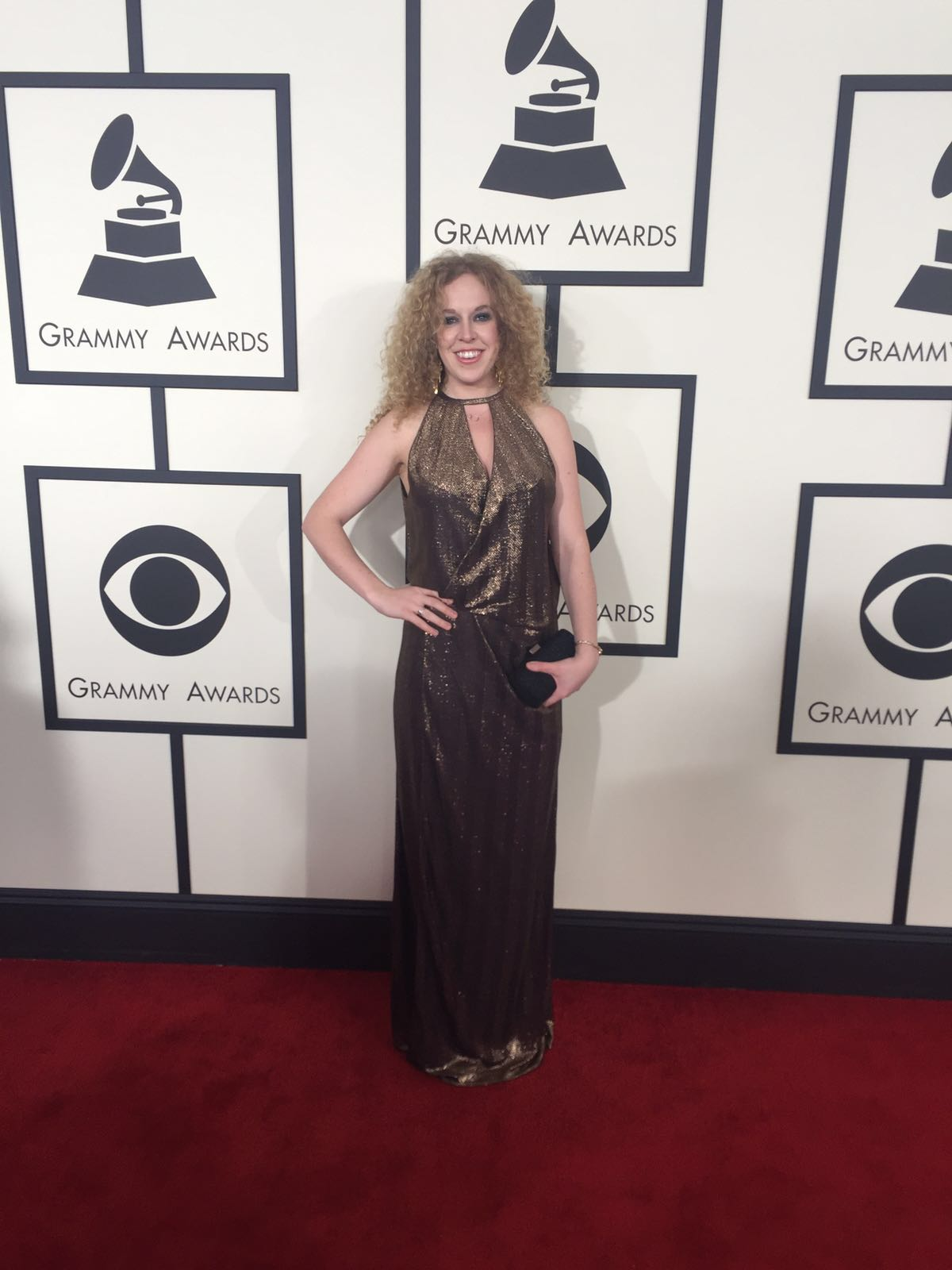
Ella Spira at the Grammy Awards 2016

Ella Spira MBE is a Grammy-nominated composer, visual artist and an award-winning theatre producer based in London, England. Spira co-founded the production company Sisters Grimm alongside ex Royal Ballet ballerina Pietra De Mello-Pittman in 2009. Spira writes and composes music for ballet and film, and works as an arranger making dance remixes for popular UK artists, but her main focus remains Sisters Grimm productions. She was born in Gloucester, and was mentored by film composer David Arnold. As a painter, Spira captured landscapes in situ of countries like China, Indonesia, Lapland, France, Albania, UAE, Brazil, Russia, the UK, and Portugal. Her artworks promote respect and appreciation for nature and raise awareness of environmental issues.

== Achievements ==
In 2008, Spira was nominated for the Channel 4 Talented Newcomers Award for production music, partly as a result of her achievements as a UK delegate for a European Arts Initiative sponsored by the British Council. A year later, she was commissioned to write a series of pieces for the BAFTA/Rocliffe New Writers’ Forum for the 2009 International Screenwriters' Festival. In the same year, Spira co-founded dance production company Sisters Grimm with Royal Ballet dancer Pietra Mello-Pittman.

Spira has created film scores, dance compositions for The Royal Ballet and made remixes for Bruno Mars, McFly, Jay Sean, Alesha Dixon and Nelly. Between 2010 and 2014, she has collaborated with South African choir Ladysmith Black Mambazo and Mark Baldwin, artistic director of Rambert Dance Company, for the dance work Inala premiered at the Edinburgh International Festival on 10 August 2014 and at London's Sadler's Wells Theatre in September 2014. Spira was nominated for a Grammy Award for Best World Music Album in 2016 for the album 'Songs from INALA' - a Zulu ballet.

Following her previous success with Inala, Ella Spira has written the musical score of a new show called Voices of the Amazon, inspired by the Amazon rainforest, where her partner, and co-founder of Sisters Grimm, Pietra Mello-Pittman, was born. Voices of the Amazon premiered in July 2017 at Sadler's Wells Theatre in London, followed by Russia and Singapore. Spira has written the musical composition in collaboration with other Brazilian songwriters and world-renowned percussionists Olodum. The dance musical was directed by Pietra Mello-Pittman, choreographed by Helen Pickett and performed by some exceptionally talented dancers, singers and musicians from Brazil. With Jeremy Irons as a narrator, the show won the Brazilian International Press Award Best Show.

In 2020, Ella composed and released 5 music videos for Sisters Grimm new Arab World Show with over 8.5 million YouTube views, including over 1 million views for "Together Let Go" and over 3 million views for the UAE National Day release United. Spira co-wrote the song "Together Let Go" with the help of rapper DB Gad and Papon, featuring vocals of Madyan Hamza and Arqam Al Abri. The music video was directed by Shantanu Suri from UAE and was released on World Music Day on 21 June, celebrating cultures and inclusivity. The song and music video United was inspired by seven Emirates-wide travels of Sisters Grimm's founders. Spira composed the song with DB Gad and Don Abdullah, featuring vocals of Shamma Hamdan, Don Abdullah (Abdullah Andeezn), Maydan Hamza and DB Gad. One year later, marking World Wildlife Day 2021, the new music video and song Windows of the Mind was released. Co-written and composed by Ella Spira MBE in collaboration with DB Gad and featuring the vocals of Madyan Hamza and DB Gad, the music video was produced by Sisters Grimm. The purpose of the project was to encourage the children from UAE to connect with nature, be environmentally conscious and giving them a chance to get involved in the 'Art in Nature' Initiative. With more than 1,000 artistic submissions used in the music video Windows of the Mind', the digital programme was supported by Dubai's Knowledge and Human Development Authority.

In the 2021 New Year Honours lists, Spira has been awarded an MBE for her services to International Trade and the Creative Industry as co-founder of the production company Sisters Grimm.

In October 2021, Ella's landscape painting ‘Shala River’ was gifted by Alastair King-Smith, the British Ambassador to Albania, to Edi Rama, the Prime Minister of Albania, celebrating 100 years of friendship between the two countries. Spira painted the ‘Shala River’ in the Albanian Alps to capture the beauty of Albania's nature, providing a new environment to discuss international political relations.

In the same year, Sisters Grimm co-founder Ella Spira auctioned off a collection of 50 UAE landscape paintings, named 50 for 50, marking the UAE's golden jubilee, showcasing the paintings she created on her travels across the UAE. The 50 for 50 UAE series, unveiled at Dubai Opera between 29 November -14 December 2021, was presented as a theatrical spectacle featuring ballet dance, music, and live singing. The live spectacle, named ‘Daughters of the Wind Overture’, was produced by Sisters Grimm and featured co-founder and former ballerina with The Royal Ballet Pietra Mello-Pittman as the performing protagonist. Singers Madyan Hamza and DB Gad joined the show with soaring vocals and creative lyrical writing. The 50 for 50 multi-sensory exhibition by Ella Spira was a celebration of the UAE's rich history, unique achievements and natural beauty. Besides showcasing a range of immersive paintings that engaged the senses through sight and sounds of creatures unique to the region blended into a musical composition, the exhibition has also promoted environmental awareness and sustainability. Every painting was accompanied by an original score which Ella has also written. Through the use of these multi-sensory elements, the exhibition aimed to inspire visitors to take action and make positive changes in their own lives and communities to protect and preserve an environment drastically transformed by industry.

In January 2022, Ella Spira collaborated with the Muslim hip-hop and rap artist, DB Gad, to co-write and compose the song 'See Beyond', a music production by Sisters Grimm. The song and music video 'See Beyond' celebrates diversity and peaceful co-existence by accepting everyone’s individuality.

A few months later, Ella Spira co-wrote and composed a new song, 'Life', in partnership with Australian singer and artist Corinne Gibbons, featuring aboriginal elder and activist Oswald Cruse MBE. The music video, released on 22 March 2022, was part of Sisters Grimm's art project for children under 18, 'Australia Art in Nature'.

Ella Spira's painting titled "Pietra in Bogor, Java" was sold at the end of July 2022 for £250,000 to Jack Tao, a Singapore-based Web3/ Metaverse investor and entrepreneur, adding to their growing landscape portfolio. The art piece depicts a banyan tree on the island of Java that occupies a special place in the gardens of Bogor. The intimate painting captures a deep calm that surrounds Ella's friend, Pietra, as she sits at the foot of the tree. The addition of this painting to their collection has brought the value of their landscape portfolio to just shy of £15 million.

Between 3–5 November 2022, the Global Landscapes Singapore immersive multimedia exhibition took place at the Art Now Gallery in the Raffles Hotel Arcade, celebrating the richness of life in and around the island through the artwork of Ella Spira MBE. The art display featured six individual paintings, a series of charcoals by Spira, known for her vibrant and expressive style, and intimate photographs taken by Singaporean photographer Rebecca Toh, documenting Ella's artistic practice. A new song and music video called What Is It Like To Be You, with an evocative score composed by Spira, which featured Singaporean cellist Olivia Chuang and incorporated Singapore thunderstorms and the sound of Toh's camera clicks, was also featured as part of the multi-sensory event. The works on display explored the diverse cultures and landscapes of Singapore, showcasing the island's appreciation for natural resources through multimedia elements such as soundscapes, and interactive installations. The exhibition was a major success, attracting hundreds of visitors and receiving critical acclaim for its innovative approach to showcasing the artwork and photographs of Spira and Toh.

== Works ==
=== Ballet and dance ===
- Reves au Chemin (2008). Created for The Royal Ballet's Draft Works performances at the Royal Opera House, Covent Garden, London. Music recorded and mixed by Bradley Kohn at Abbey Road Studios
- Rapunzel – The Final Chapter (2009). Sisters Grimm ballet film; co-production with the Royal Opera House/The Royal Ballet. Music recorded at Air Lyndhurst Studios
- Inala (2014). Co-composer with Joseph Shabalala; Sisters Grimm production with Rambert Dance Company, The Royal Ballet and Ladysmith Black Mambazo. Music recorded at Abbey Road Studios
- Voices of the Amazon (2017). Co-composer with Brazilian songwriters and percussionist Olodum; Sisters Grimm production with Jeremy Irons as narrator and Helen Pickett as choreographer.
- Daughters of the Wind Overture (2021). Co-composer with DB Gad; Sisters Grimm production with Pietra Mello-Pittman as performing protagonist and DB Gad and Madyan Hamza as singers.

=== Film music ===
- The Fixer (2008). Co-composer with Bradley Kohn for the ITV drama series The Fixer. Music recorded at Home Farm Studios, Hertfordshire
- Uncut (2009). Uncut is the first British feature film shot in one take and was screened at BAFTA. Music recorded at Dean Street Studios
- Jasmine (2011). A Film London short film. Screened at the 2011 BFI Film Festival

=== Music videos ===
- Together Let Go (2020). Composer and co-writer with DB Gad; Lead vocals of Madyan Hamza and Arqam Al Abri; Sisters Grimm production.
- Been El Nogoom - Between The Stars (2020). Composer and co-writer with DB Gad; Sisters Grimm production.
- The Way Home (2020). Composer and co-writer with DB Gad; Lead vocals of Arqam Al-Abri and Layla Kardan; Sisters Grimm production; Filmed at Dubai Opera.
- United (2020). Composer and co-writer with DB Gad; Lead vocals of Shamma Hamdan, Don Abdullah (Abdullah Andeezn), Maydan Hamza and DB Gad; Sisters Grimm production.
- Windows of the Mind (2021). Composer and co-writer with DB Gad; Lead vocals of Madyan Hamza singing in Arabic and DB Gad singing in English; Sisters Grimm production.
- See Beyond(2022). Composer and co-writer with DB Gad; Lead vocals of Madyan Hamza and DB Gad; Sisters Grimm production.
- Life(2022). Composer and co-writer with Corinne Gibbons; Lead vocals of Corinne Gibbons, featuring aboriginal elder and activist Oswald Cruse MBE; Sisters Grimm production.
- What is it like to be you(2022). Composer and writer; featuring Singaporean cellist Olivia Chuang; Sisters Grimm production.

=== Remixes ===
In 2010, Spira began an association with Steve Smart and West Funk and worked as an arranger on club remixes for the following Top 20 UK hits:

- Bruno Mars, "Just The Way You Are"
- Nelly, "Just a Dream"
- Jay Sean ft Nicki Minaj "2012"
- Alesha Dixon ft Jay Sean "Every Little Part of Me"
- McFly, "Shine a Light"

=== Art series ===
- Albania series(October 2021). 'Shala River’ landscape painting, created in the Albanian Alps in situ, gifted by Alastair King-Smith, the new British Ambassador of Albania, to Prime Minister Edi Rama.
- Gulf series(November - December 2021). 50 UAE landscape paintings, each accompanied by a unique musical score. World Premiere at Dubai Opera during the Nation’s 50th Anniversary.
- Indonesia series(2015-2022). 5 landscape paintings featuring Ella Spira's friend, the co-founder of Sisters Grimm and Ex Royal Ballet dancer Pietra Mello-Pittman MBE.
- Singapore series(November 2022). 6 landscape paintings of Singapore and a series of charcoals, accompanied by a unique musical score and photographs of Ella taken by Singaporean Rebecca Toh. World Premiere at Art Now Gallery, Raffles Hotel Singapore.
