= Michelmore =

Michelmore or Mitchelmore is a surname. Notable people with the surname include:

- Andrew Michelmore, Australian lightweight rower who won a gold medal at the 1974 World Rowing Championships in Lucerne
- Christopher Mitchelmore (born 1985), Canadian politician
- Cliff Michelmore (1919–2016), English television presenter and producer
- Godwin Michelmore (1894–1982), British army officer
- Guy Michelmore, English film/TV composer and former television news presenter, son of Cliff Michelmore
- Janet Hailes Michelmore, Australian women's health educator
- Laurence Michelmore (1909–1997), UNRWA Commissioner-General 1964–1971

== See also ==
- Mitchell (surname)
- Macklemore
