= The Boat Race 1978 =

124th Boat Race
- Date: 25 March 1978
- Winner: Oxford
- Margin of victory: Cambridge sank
- Winning time: 18 minutes 58 seconds
- Overall record (Cambridge–Oxford): 68–55
- Umpire: James Crowden (Cambridge)

Other races
- Reserve winner: Goldie
- Women's winner: Cambridge

The 124th Boat Race between crews from the University of Oxford and the University of Cambridge took place on the River Thames on 25 March 1978. Umpired by former Cambridge rower James Crowden, Oxford won in a time of 18 minutes and 58 seconds. The race was complicated by bad weather, and when faced with choppy water, a strong headwind and horizontal, driving rain, the Cambridge boat, which lacked splashboards, took on water and sank. It was the fifth time a boat had sunk during the event.

In the reserve race, Cambridge's Goldie beat Oxford's Isis by 1 1/4 lengths. Cambridge won the 33rd Women's Boat Race.

== Background ==
The Boat Race is a side-by-side rowing competition between the University of Oxford and the University of Cambridge. First held in 1829, the competition is a 4.2-mile (6.8 km) race along the River Thames in southwest London. The rivalry is a major point of honour between the two universities and is followed throughout the United Kingdom and worldwide. Oxford went into the race as reigning champions, having won the 1977 race by seven lengths, with Cambridge leading overall with 68 victories to Oxford's 54 (excluding the "dead heat" of 1877). The 1978 race was sponsored by Ladbrokes, while the BBC had paid between £10,000 and £20,000 to televise the event.

During training for the race, Oxford had sunk, taking on water in the inclement weather, and had decided to fit splashboards to their boat, while Cambridge opted to leave their boat unchanged. Prior to this year's event, there had been four sinkings in the history of the race. Cambridge sank in 1859, Oxford sank in 1925 and 1951, and both crews sank in 1912.

The first Women's Boat Race took place in 1927, but did not become an annual fixture until the 1960s. Up until 2014, the contest was conducted as part of the Henley Boat Races, but as of the 2015 race, it is held on the River Thames, on the same day as the men's main and reserve races. The reserve race, contested between Oxford's Isis boat and Cambridge's Goldie boat has been held since 1965. It usually takes place on the Tideway, prior to the main Boat Race.

== Crews ==
Oxford's crew contained three Old Blues in Moran, Shealy and the former lightweight world champion Andy Michelmore, while Cambridge's boat featured five returning rowers in Bathurst, Clegg, Horton, Ross and Cooke-Yarborough. The race also marked the debut of Boris Rankov, who went on to represent Oxford in five further races. The Cambridge crew was marginally heavier per rower, averaging 1.5 pounds (0.68 kg) more than Oxford.

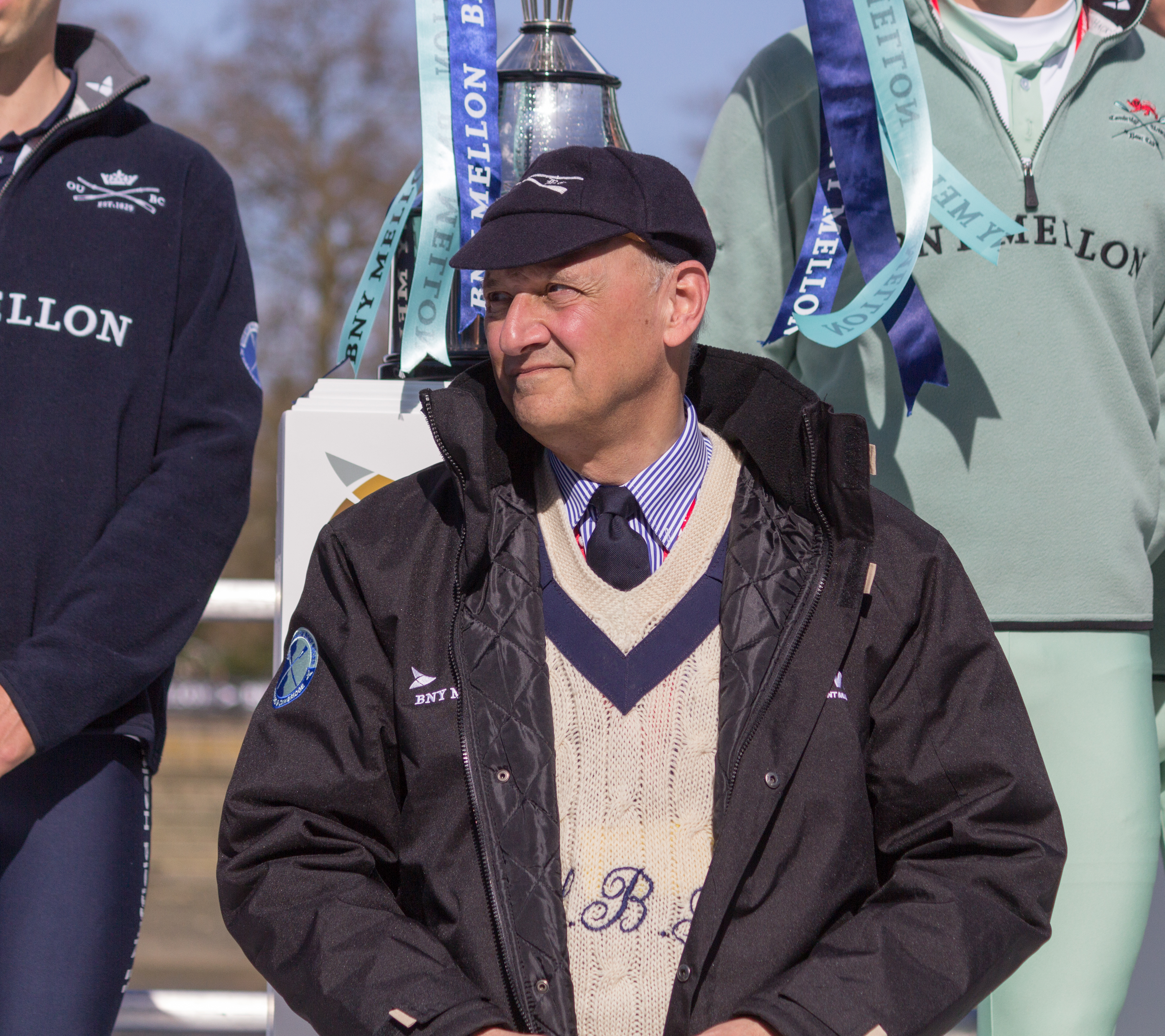
Boris Rankov (pictured in 2015) made the first of his six appearances for Oxford.

Seat	Oxford			Cambridge		
Seat	Name	College	Weight	Name	College	Weight
Bow	T. J. Sutton	St Catherine's	14 st 2 lb	M. D. Bathurst	Pembroke	13 st 4 lb
2	R. A. Crockford	Corpus Christi	13 st 2 lb	S. J. Clegg	St Catharine's	13 st 6 lb
3	J. R. Crawford	Pembroke	14 st 0 lb	W. M. R. Dawkins	1st & 3rd Trinity	14 st 5 lb
4	N. B. Rankov	Corpus Christi	14 st 3 lb	C. M. Horton (P)	Downing	14 st 1 lb
5	M. M. Moran	Keble	14 st 2 lb	R. C. Ross	Lady Margaret	14 st 7 lb
6	A. W. Shealy	University	14 st 2 lb	A. E. Cooke-Yarborough	Gonville and Caius	14 st 8 lb
7	J. W. Wood	Pembroke	12 st 10 lb	A. N. de M. Jelfs	Fitzwilliam	13 st 3 lb
Stroke	A. G. Michelmore (P)	New College	12 st 3 lb	R. N. E. Davies	St Catharine's	12 st 2 lb
Cox	J. Fail	Oriel	7 st 13 lb	G. Henderson	Downing	8 st 5 lb
Source: (P) – boat club president

== Race description ==
The Championship Course

Oxford won the toss and elected to start from the Surrey station. After a false start, the race commenced at 2.45 p.m. in reasonable weather conditions, and Oxford took a one-length lead to Hammersmith Bridge in a record time of 6 minutes 24 seconds. As the crews turned into the Surrey bend, conditions drastically worsened with a strong headwind and "horizontal rain driving into them". Entering choppy water and in an attempt to push past Oxford, Cambridge made their challenge at Barnes Bridge but began to take on water. Within seconds the boat started to sink; the Oxford crew realised the contest was over and rowed carefully to the finish in a time of 18 minutes 58 seconds. It was Oxford's third victory in a row, and their fourth in the past five years.

In the reserve race, Cambridge's Goldie beat Oxford's Isis by 1 1/4 lengths, and in the 33rd running of the Women's Boat Race, Cambridge also triumphed.

== Reaction ==
Cambridge boat club president Mark Horton immediately challenged the Oxford president Andy Michelmore to a re-row; the challenge was declined. Horton recalls "It was hard to take and is still a painful memory. The Boat Race was supposed to be one of the proudest moments of my life". Cambridge's Mark Bathurst was indignant about the preparation of the boat: "we had taken to the water without fitting any [splashboards] – an act of monumental idiocy". Oxford cox Fail told The Guardian "I was surprised when I heard that Cambridge had sunk. If you keep going steadily you forget about water and ride it out."

Cambridge's sinking was featured as the 79th in Channel 4's 100 Greatest Sporting Moments.
