= Pietra De Mello-Pittman =

Brazilian-British retired Royal Ballet dancer

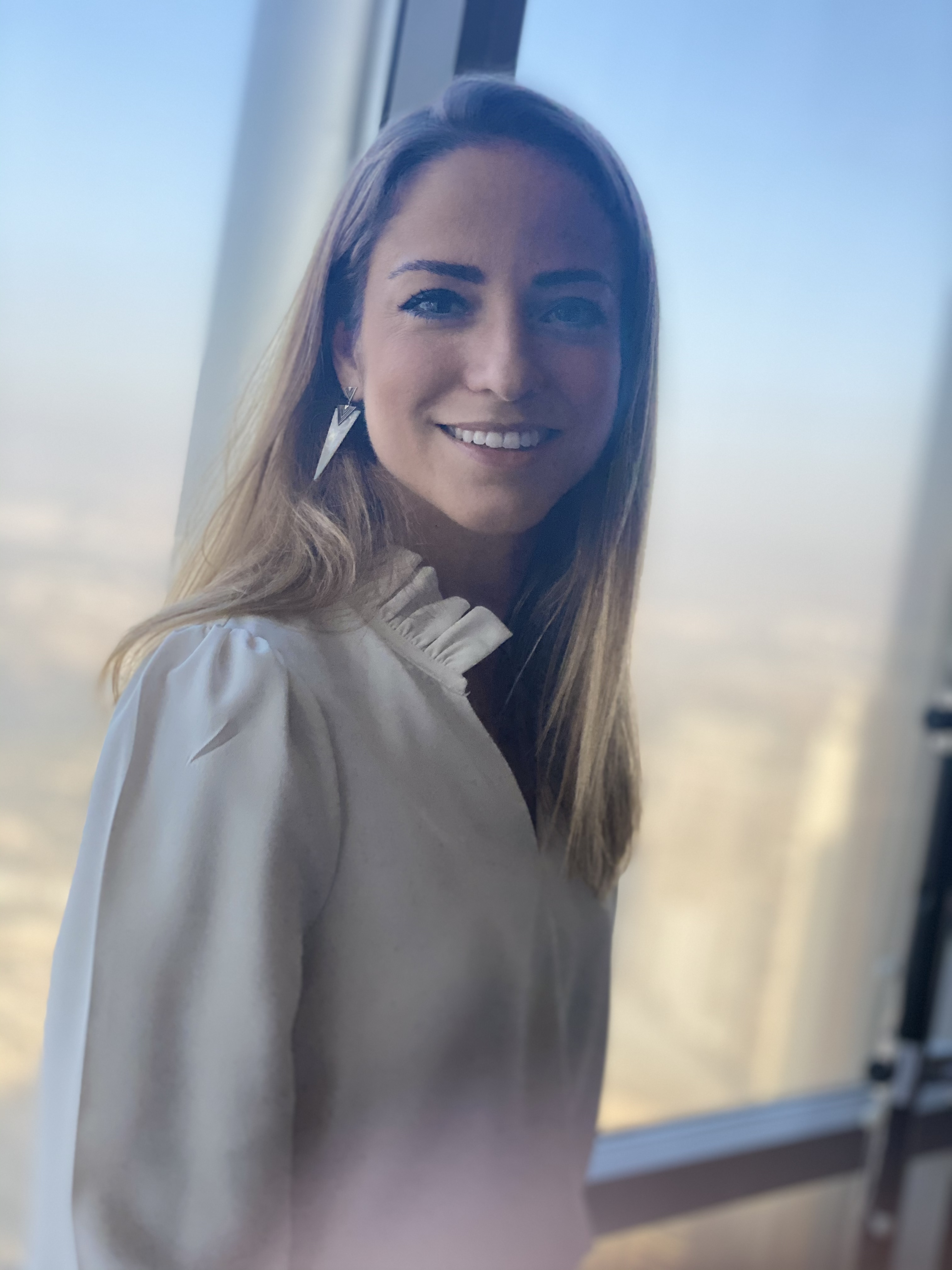
Pietra Mello-Pittman Co-founder of Sisters Grimm

Pietra-Marie de Mello-Pittman MBE (born 14 April 1983) is a Brazilian-British retired Royal Ballet dancer and co-founder and co-director of Sisters Grimm Ltd. She founded the company with composer Ella Spira in 2009 while still in the corps de ballet. A former First Artist of The Royal Ballet, she graduated into the Company in 2002 and trained at The Royal Ballet Upper School. She was promoted to First Artist in 2008 and retired from the Company in 2015. In 2021 she received an MBE for services to International Trade and the Creative Industry in the New Year Honours.

== Early life ==
Mello-Pittman was born in Rio de Janeiro to a Brazilian mother and English father. She attended St Catherine’s School Bramley, Surrey, from 1988 to 1999, before joining the Royal Ballet Upper School in London at age 15. While still at the school, Pietra performed with Birmingham Royal Ballet on tour. In 2001, she won the Ursula Moreton Choreographic Award, and joined the Royal Ballet Company in 2002.

== Dance career ==
As a First Artist ballerina for 13 years, Mello-Pittman performed in numerous classical repertories with the Royal Ballet Company, including Tavern Girl (Don Quixote), Swan Lake, Sleeping Beauty, Romeo and Juliet, The Nutcracker, La Bayadère, Manon, Gloria, Mayerling, Requiem, Ondine, The Rite of Spring, Cinderella, The Tales of Beatrix Potter, Eugene Onegin, The Four Temperaments, Ballo della Regina, Carmen, and Giselle. Pittman has also created roles in new productions, such as Alice’s Adventures in Wonderland, Tryst, and A Winter’s Tale by Christopher Wheeldon, Sensorium by Alastair Marriott, Les Saisons by David Bintley (CBE), Three Songs – Two Voices by Christopher Bruce. She performed with the Royal Ballet in Europe, the US, the Far East, and Cuba, and at the Mariinsky and Bolshoi Theatres in Russia.

== Post-dance career ==
Between 2010 - 2014, Mello-Pittman produced the dance show 'INALA - a Zulu Ballet', composed by Ella Spira and choreographed by artistic director Mark Baldwin with Royal Ballet and Rambert dancers. The show premiered at the Edinburgh Festival on 10 August 2014 and London's Sadler's Wells Theatre in September 2014. In 2016, 'INALA - a Zulu Ballet' was Grammy-nominated for Best World Music Album and the Best Special Entertainment Award at the Manchester Theatre Awards and featured on the Royal Variety Performance.

Mello-Pittman retired as a dancer in 2015 to focus on producing cross-cultural and multidisciplinary collaborations for Sisters Grimm, a company she co-founded with her partner and friend Ella Spira MBE in 2009.

In the same year, Mello-Pittman received a 'Women of the Future Awards' nomination for Arts and Culture.

In 2017, Pittman was nominated for Best Director for 'Voices of the Amazon', a dance musical that combines the art of ballet, capoeira and a Brazilian score. The show was inspired by the Amazon rainforest and had the clear purpose of making people aware of the permanent effects of deforestation. 'Voices of the Amazon', performed by a culturally diverse cast, with Helen Pickett as a choreographer, Jeremy Irons as narrator and composer Ella Spira as score writer, premiered in July 2017 at Chekhov International Theatre Festival Russia, then at Sadler's Wells Theatre in London and Singapore. The dance musical won the Brazilian International Press Award for Best Show in 2018.

In 2021, Mello-Pittman was awarded an MBE for her services to International Trade and the Creative Industry in the 2021 New Year Honours lists.

A few months later, Pietra performed for the first time in Dubai as the main protagonist of the theatrical spectacle 'Daughters of the Wind' at Dubai Opera. The show, featuring art, ballet and music, tells the story of a land transformed by industry, showcasing the best of the UAE and celebrating Arab culture. Pietra was joined on stage by singers DB Gad and Madyan Hamza. The show unveiled the ‘50 for 50’ art collection in honour of the UAE’s Golden Jubilee year, painted by the artist Ella Spira, who co-wrote the music with DB Gad.
