= Dorothy Jean Hailes =

Australian medical practitioner

Known as 'Jean', Dorothy Jean Hailes AM (22 June 1926 – 27 November 1988) was an Australian medical practitioner in the 20th century who pioneered health care for women in midlife and particularly to address women's experience of menopause.

Hailes, along with a group of other doctors and scientists, was instrumental in the creation of the Australasian Menopause Society. Her legacy is honoured in the Jean Hailes Foundation for Women’s Health established in 1992, along with the women's health clinic established the same year and also named for her.;

== Early life and education ==
Hailes was born on 22 June 1926 in Ascot Vale, Melbourne to surgeon William Allan Hailes and Mary Maud Whitfield. She had an older sister and a younger sister.

Hailes attended Melbourne Girls Grammar where in 1943, she was head prefect. Hailes went on to attend the University of Melbourne where she obtained her MBBS in 1949. She then began medical training at the Royal Melbourne Hospital where she completed her medical training as a resident medical officer in 1950.

== Career ==
Hailes worked at Travancore Developmental Centre as an officer who worked with children who were intellectually disabled and their mothers. Through this work and later in general practice Hailes became aware of the neglect by doctors of the 'minor' symptoms of women during mid-life.

In 1962 Hailes joined the Australian Red Cross Society, where she was a medical officer in the Victorian Division's blood transfusion service for ten years. However meeting Canadian physician Robert Greenblatt in the late 1960s in the United States she learned how hormone treatment could be used to address menopause related health needs experienced by women.

Returning to Australia Hailes confronted the medical fraternity for their neglect to promote hormone treatment (due to side-effect concerns). While she was not widely supported Dr. (later Professor) Henry Burger was a senior medical colleagues who continued to promote Hailes work long after her death . As a result of his support in 1971 Hailes became an honorary clinical assistant in Burger's endocrinology clinic at the Prince Henry’s Hospital. As Burger wrote in the Forward to Managing the Menopause many years later, Hailes gave an interview to The Age newspaper about the potential to treat menopause symptoms. The result was that the hospital was deluged with women seeking help and a separate formal Menopause Clinic was established.

For the next nine years women experiencing menopause went to Hailes for related health issues. Critically this clinic, staffed by Hailes and other sympathetic women doctors at Prince Henry's accepted patients without requiring a medical referral.

Hailes had created Australia's first health clinic dedicated to women in midlife and menopause, one of the first such clinics in the world.

Yet recognition by the mainstream medical community for her work on women's health in midlife remained slow to occur. She joined Monash University student health service as a medical officer in 1972 and served the students of her alma mater the University of Melbourne in a similar medical role for three years to 1975.

The Royal Women's finally allowed her to establish her second menopause clinic at the hospital in 1976 which she served for ten years.

Following her persistent and effective efforts to promote public awareness of the unmet health needs of women in midlife and beyond the mainstream medicine community eventually began to recognise Hailes' clinical and research expertise.

Ultimately her work and it's ramifications could not be ignored by the broader medical community. She co-authored several landmark papers in the Medical Journal of Australia from 1977 on her research program. The first with Henry Burger was `Oestrogens and Menopausal and Post-menopausal Women’. In the 1980s Jean's menopause related studies with Professor Burger and others resulted in important research findings published in influential journals such as the Journal of Cliinical Endocrinology and Metabolism.

Hailes also oversaw the introduction of bone density measurement services at Prince Henry’s Institute. This was a critical step in recognising and managing osteoporosis, a condition that disproportionately affects women after menopause.

In 1982 Hailes was one of a group of doctors behind the first national conference on menopause in Australia. This contributed to the formation of Australasian Menopause Society (AMS). The annual prize for Best Paper awarded by the Society was funded by Hailes.

Today Jean Hailes Memorial Prize is presented to the best free communication or poster presentation by a current AMS member who is still within 10 years of having completed their tertiary degree.

Hailes public awareness efforts confronted myths on the issues related to menopause. She appeared on talkback radio and she spoke to community groups. She wrote a booklet — The Middle Years in 1980 — which in six years ran three editions. She worked with the feminist movement's concurrent campaign to establish women's health services. Hailes was appointed AM in 1986.

Following her death in 1989 the Medical Journal of Australia published a tribute to Jean Hailes co-authored by the now Professor Burger.

== Personal life ==
Hailes married medical practitioner Henry Buckhurst Kay on 21 November 1951 in Christ Church, South Yarra and together they had three children, including Janet Hailes Michelmore. On 27 November 1988 Hailes died of cancer at South Yarra. Her body was cremated soon after.

== Posthumous impact ==
Established in 1992, the Jean Hailes Foundation for Women's Health ensures that Hailes's work is continued in clinical, research and educatational dimensions. Jean Hailes continued impact in public health, clinical practice and policy, includes the Foundation's work producing practical and easy-to-understand information for women and for health professionals. Translating research and medical evidence the Foundation also delivers information in many ways to suit diverse audiences and support its mission of empowering women across Australia to enjoy their best health and wellbeing at every life stage.

The Jean Hailes Research Unit at Monash University, which connects the university to clinical services based in translation of knowledge, was also named in Hailes' honour.

In 2012 Hailes was inducted onto the Victorian Honour Roll of Women.
