= Janet Hailes Michelmore =

Janet Hailes Michelmore AO
- Born: Janet Hailes
- Education: BA DipEd Monash University
- Occupations: Educator, fundraiser, board director
- Employer: Jean Hailes for Women's Health
- Known for: Women's health
- Spouse: Andrew Michelmore
- Mother: Jean Hailes
- Awards: Fellow, Monash University (2015); Victorian Honour Roll of Women (2013)
- Website: https://www.jeanhailes.org.au/

Janet Hailes Michelmore AO is the founder and chief executive officer of Jean Hailes for Women's Health, an Australia-wide not-for-profit organisation that provides health information and resources for women of all ages and health professionals.

Michelmore was made an Officer of the Order of Australia in the 2001 Australia Day Honours for "service to women, particularly through education campaigns to raise public awareness of women's health issues and services provided by the Jean Hailes Foundation". In the same year she was awarded the Centenary Medal for "outstanding service to women's health and wellbeing". In 2013 she was inducted onto the Victorian Honour Roll of Women and Monash University elected her a Fellow in 2015.

== Personal ==
Michelmore is married to Andrew Michelmore, who is a fellow board member of Jean Hailes for Women's Health.
