= Ian Johnston (doctor) =

Ian Johnston (Walter Ian Harewood Johnston, 16 February 1930 – 19 March 2001) was one of the true pioneers of reproductive medicine in Australia. He was a primary contributor to the development of human IVF (In vitro fertilisation) in Melbourne, Australia. He was the Head of the Reproductive Biology Unit at the Royal Women's Hospital, Melbourne and was the founding President and Honorary Life Member of The Fertility Society of Australia. Ian was known as the 'founding father of IVF in Australia'

He announced the first Australian IVF pregnancy and the third of such pregnancies in the world. The birth of the first Australian IVF baby, Candice Reed, took place on June 23, 1980.

On 26 January 2001, Ian was awarded with Member of the Order of Australia for service to medicine. He died of laryngeal cancer a few months later.

== Quotes ==
- "His footprints are all over the pioneering technologies of IVF" – Alan Trounson, RBM Online, 2001
- "It's [IVF] part of my life. I wouldn't be here without it" - Candice Reed, The Sydney Morning Herald, 1 December 2005.

== Education ==
- Scotch College, Melbourne
- University of Melbourne, graduating in medicine in 1954.
- Master of Gynaecology & Obstetrics, University of Melbourne, 1964.

== Awards ==
- Founding President and Honorary Life Member of The Fertility Society of Australia
- Member of the Order of Australia (2001). For service to medicine, particularly in the areas of infertility and reproductive biology, through the development of treatment techniques, pioneering the use of laparoscopy as a diagnostic tool, and the establishment of support and counselling services for patients and their families.
- Royal Australian and New Zealand Collegeof Obstetricians and Gynaecologists. 2001 Honour Board

== Appearances ==
Johnston appeared in the documentary Chasing God as a scientist.

== Sources ==
- Reproductive BioMedicine Online, Volume 2, Number 3, May 2001, pp. 215–215(1). Author: Alan Trounson. Publisher: Reproductive Healthcare Ltd.
- The Fertility Society of Australia.
- Discovery Newsletter, (a publication of the royal women's hospital division of research & education), June 2001.
