= Judith Green (swimmer) =

Australian Paralympic swimmer (born 1967)

Personal information
- Full name: Judith-Lee Alice Green
- Nationality: Australia
- Born: 7 February 1967 (age 59)
Medal record
Swimming
Paralympic Games
Gold medal – first place	2000 Sydney	Women's 100 m Breaststroke SB6
IPC Swimming World Championships
Gold medal – first place	1998 Christchurch	Women's 100 m Breaststroke SB6
Bronze medal – third place	1998 Christchurch	Women's 4 x 50 Medley Open

Judith-Lee Alice Green, OAM (born 7 February 1967) is an Australian Paralympic swimmer. She won a gold medal at the 2000 Sydney Games in the Women's 100 m Breaststroke SB6 event, for which she received a Medal of the Order of Australia.
