= Edwin Thomas Brown =

Australian mining and civil engineer

Edwin Thomas "Ted" Brown (born 4 December 1938, Castlemaine, Victoria Australia) is an Australian mining and civil engineer acknowledged as a world expert in the field of rock mechanics.

His academic career spanned 36 years from 1965 to 2001. He received a Ph.D. from the University of Queensland in 1969, a D.Sc. (Engineering) from the University of London in 1985, he was lecturer and associate professor at James Cook University, then Reader and Professor of Rock Mechanics at the Imperial College of Science and Technology in London (1975–1987), serving as Dean of the Royal School of Mines 1983–1986. On return to Australia, he became Dean of Engineering at the University of Queensland. He was appointed an Emeritus Professor in 2001.
