= The Boat Race 1977 =

123rd Boat Race
- Date: 19 March 1977
- Winner: Oxford
- Margin of victory: 7 lengths
- Winning time: 19 minutes 28 seconds
- Overall record (Cambridge–Oxford): 68–54
- Umpire: Ronnie Howard (Oxford)

Other races
- Reserve winner: Goldie
- Women's winner: Cambridge

The 123rd Boat Race took place on 19 March 1977. Held annually, the Boat Race is a side-by-side rowing race between crews from the Universities of Oxford and Cambridge along the River Thames. Oxford won by seven lengths, their biggest margin of victory for more than 90 years. It was the first time in the history of the event that one of the crews, Oxford, used a plastic boat as opposed to a wooden one. It was also the first race to have an official sponsor in Ladbrokes.

In the reserve race, Cambridge's Goldie beat Oxford's Isis by seven lengths. Cambridge won the 32nd Women's Boat Race.

== Background ==
The Boat Race is a side-by-side rowing competition between the University of Oxford (sometimes referred to as the "Dark Blues") and the University of Cambridge (sometimes referred to as the "Light Blues"). The race was first held in 1829, and since 1845 has taken place on the 4.2-mile (6.8 km) Championship Course on the River Thames in southwest London. The rivalry is a "hotly contested point of honour" between the two universities. Oxford went into the race as reigning champions, having won the 1976 race by 6 1/2 lengths, with Cambridge leading overall with 68 victories to Oxford's 53 (excluding the "dead heat" of 1877).

The first Women's Boat Race took place in 1927, but did not become an annual fixture until the 1960s. Up until 2014, the contest was conducted as part of the Henley Boat Races, but as of the 2015 race, it is held on the River Thames, on the same day as the men's main and reserve races. The reserve race, contested between Oxford's Isis boat and Cambridge's Goldie boat has been held since 1965. It usually takes place on the Tideway, prior to the main Boat Race.

Both crews rowed in monocoque boats for the first time in the history of the race; Oxford used a Carbocraft shell (combining carbon fibre and plastic) for the first time, while Cambridge raced in a prototype developed by Imperial College London. Journalist and author Christopher Dodd referred to the boats as "the most up-to-date boats that the rowing world has seen". The race was sponsored for the first time, by British betting company Ladbrokes, who would sponsor the event until the 1987 race when they were replaced by Beefeater Gin.

== Crews ==
The Oxford crew weighed an average of 13 st 9.5 lb (86.7 kg), just over 6 pounds (2.7 kg) per rower more than their opponents. Returning Cambridge cox Joe Manser, at 9 st 11 lb, weighed 30 pounds (14 kg) more than his counterpart Colin Moynihan. Along with Manser, Cambridge saw the return of just one other former Blue in David Searle, while Oxford's crew included three Boat Race participants in Bob Mason, Crispin Money-Coutts and John Wiggins.

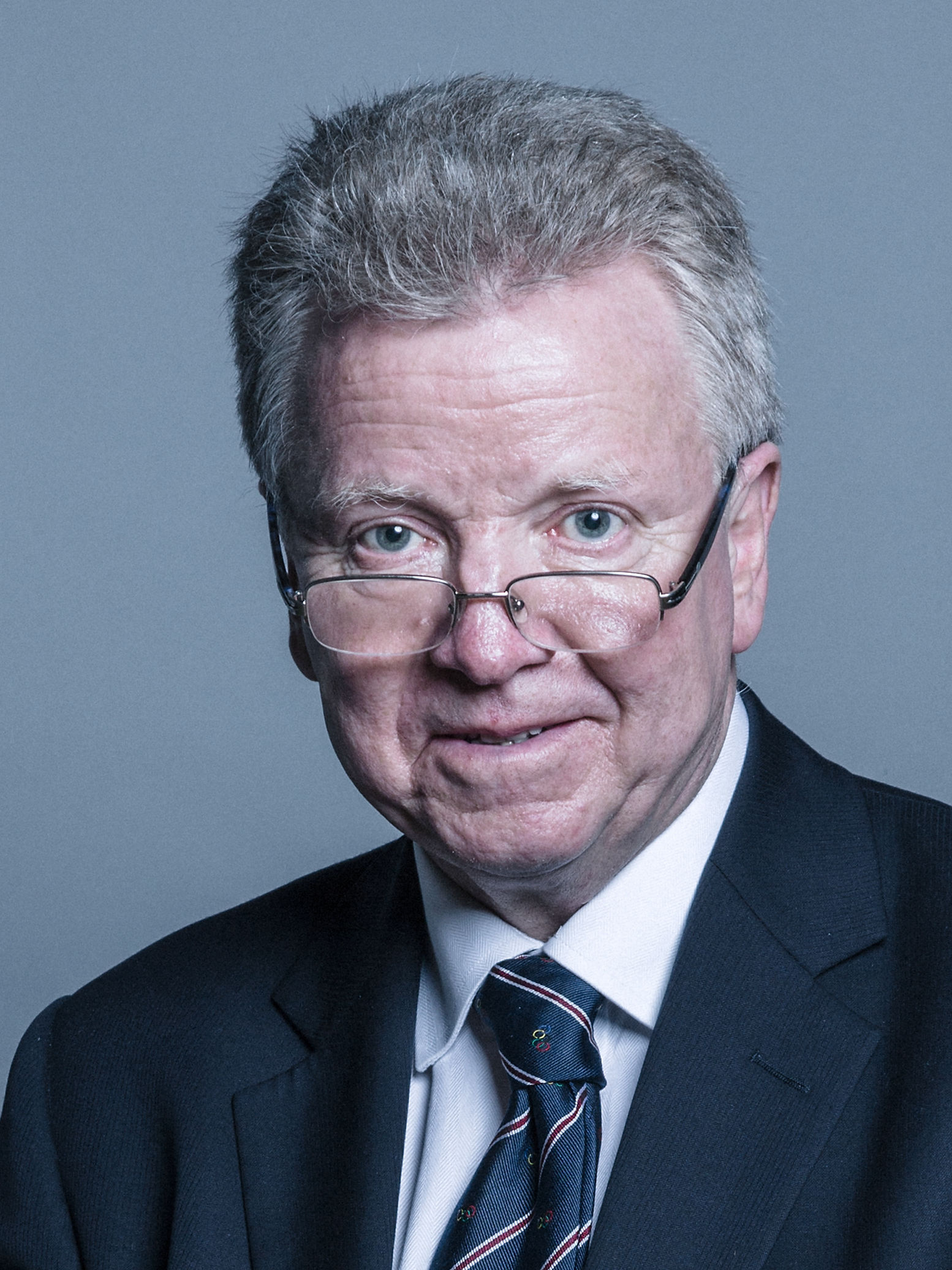
Colin Moynihan (pictured in 2018) coxed Oxford in the 1977 Boat Race.

Seat	Oxford			Cambridge		
Seat	Name	College	Weight	Name	College	Weight
Bow	P. S. T. Wright	Oriel	12 st 11 lb	N. G. Burnet	Clare	11 st 11 lb
2	G. E. Vardey	Balliol	12 st 10 lb	A. R. Waterer	Sidney Sussex	13 st 1 lb
3	M. M. Moran	Keble	14 st 4 lb	D. J. Searle	St Catharine's	12 st 6 lb
4	R. S. Mason	Keble	14 st 8 lb	A. E. Cooke-Yarborough	Gonville & Caius	14 st 4 lb
5	C. J. A. N. Money-Coutts	Keble	15 st 2 lb	R. C. Ross	Lady Margaret Boat Club	14 st 1 lb
6	A. Shealey	University	14 st 6 lb	C. M. Horton (P)	Downing	14 st 0 lb
7	A. J. Wiggins	Keble	13 st 3 lb	M. D. Bathurst	Pembroke	13 st 6 lb
Stroke	A. G. Michelmore (P)	New College	12 st 3 lb	S. J. Clegg	St Catharine's	12 st 10 lb
Cox	C. B. Moynihan	University	7 st 9 lb	J. P. Manser	Sidney Sussex	9 st 11 lb
Sources: (P) – boat club president

== Race ==
The Championship Course along which the Boat Race is conducted

Oxford started the race as "one of the strongest favourites of all time", with The Guardian's Christopher Dodd writing that "Oxford have some world-class pedigree". They won the toss and elected to start from the Surrey station. Within thirty seconds of the start, and in calm conditions, Oxford were a length ahead at Fulham F.C. They moved further ahead to a two-length lead by the Mile Post, and a six-second advantage over the Light Blues. Oxford extended their lead to three lengths and nine seconds by the time both crews shot Hammersmith Bridge, where the crews were subjected to choppy water, but between there and Chiswick Steps, Oxford raced further ahead, gaining at least two further lengths on Cambridge. Twenty seconds ahead at Barnes Bridge, the Dark Blues continued to press home their advantage, and passed the finishing post in a time of 19 minutes 28 seconds, 22 seconds ahead of Cambridge. It was Oxford's third victory in four years, and the seven-length margin of victory was their greatest since their win in the 1898 race.

In the 13th running of the reserve race, Cambridge's Goldie beat Oxford's Isis by seven lengths in a time of 19 minutes 35 seconds. It was Goldie's first victory since 1974. Cambridge won the 32nd Women's Boat Race, their fourteenth victory in fifteen years.

== Reaction ==
Oxford stroke Andy Michelmore was surprised by the conditions: "we couldn't extend ourselves until the very end." Of the rough water, Michelmore's cox, Moynihan, said "a sinking was possible. We shipped, I think, a couple of inches of water and I was more than apprehensive".
