= Elery Hamilton-Smith =

Elery Hamilton-Smith AM (28 December 1929 – 27 June 2015) was an Australian interdisciplinary scholar and academic, and later an adjunct professor of Environmental Studies at Charles Sturt University.

== Background ==
Elery Hamilton-Smith was born on a property named Shady Grove, near Hahndorf and grew up in rural South Australia.

He did not have conventional academic training, and graduated from the University of Adelaide with a Diploma in Social Sciences in 1956.

His professional career moved between research, consultancy and teaching in 50 countries.

- From 1949 to 1968 he worked in teaching and community services.
- From 1969 to 1977 he was a social policy & planning consultant, with an honorary position as zoologist at the South Australia Museum. His work included many studies on social policy and open space in Victoria, Australia.
- In the 1980s and 90s he was lecturer and then Professor, latterly in the Department of Leisure Studies, Phillip Institute of Technology (now RMIT University), Melbourne.
- Professor, Department of Environmental Studies, Charles Sturt University
- He spent a total of 15 years outside Australia working for the UNESCO World Heritage Bureau and the United Nations Development Program. Educational
- Fellowship with the Government of Canada.
- He also had many years of working (as a volunteer) within various IUCN programs.

== Professional contributions ==
Hamilton-Smith had wide interests. He worked on:

- social policy development and programmes dealing with youth issues.
- development of leisure and outdoor recreation activities
- Conservation, particularly tourism and visitor appreciation of wilderness and National Parks
- Cave and karst management
- sustainability and environmental studies.

== Awards ==
- Membership of the Order of Australia (AM) in Australia Day Honours List in 2001
- former federal president of the Australian Association of Social Workers

== Bibliography ==
- Elery Hamilton-Smith. 2013. Natural heritage and environmental citizenship. In Stewart Lockie and Heather Aslin (eds.) Engaged Environmental Citizenship. Charles Darwin University Press. pp 136–149.
- Elery Hamilton-Smith. 2010. Click Go the Cameras at Jenolan Caves 1860-1940 Occasional Paper No. 6. Jenolan Caves Historical & Preservation Society.
- Brian Finlayson & Elery Hamilton-Smith (eds.) 2003. Beneath the Surface: A Natural History of Australian Caves. University of New South Wales Press.
- Elery Hamilton-Smith (ed.) 1992. Park visitor research for better management Papers from a workshop convened by the Department of Leisure Studies, Phillip Institute of Technology in conjunction with Charles Sturt University and Melbourne Water, 24–26 June 1992.
- Elery Hamilton-Smith, David Mercer. 1991. Urban Parks and Their Visitors. Melbourne and Metropolitan Board of Works.
- David Mercer, Elery Hamilton-Smith. 1980. Recreation Planning and Social Change in Australia. Sorrett Publishing.
- Elery Hamilton-Smith, Colin John Balmer 1972. Broadmeadows - a Growing City. Youth Services Planning Division, Victorian Association of Youth Clubs. 586pp.
