= Corinne Gibbons =

Australian singer-songwriter

Corinne Gibbons, is an Australian singer-songwriter active in the global independent music scene. She kicked off her touring career with Jack Sonni from Dire Straits and went on to record with Tower of Power in Los Angeles in her early career.

Corinne has released 4 albums. The 2002 release of Dusk’, peaked at #2 on Australia’s Independent Jazz Charts. Her 3rd album, MELT, was released in 2009 Won awards at Two The World Wildlife Film Festivals, The Hamptons, and North Virginia festivals inclusively. She also won a world Peace award in the UK for Melts contribution to the Planet for Climate action.

In 2006 Corinne moved to Singapore where she has had a prolific time as a songwriter. Focused on music for children, she has composed music for three commercial children's musicals, two for Singapore Repertory Theatre, "Bear and Chicken" and "Jungle Book." She also composed a song for Hi5 Five Food Groups.

She founded her Children's music mentoring program, which provides singing and songwriting workshops for children from 7 years of age. Her education program "Search For the Sparkle" has supported thousands of children to find their voice through creativity and singing.

She founded Discover Your Voice which facilitates Choral workshops for companies - creating harmony in the work place through harmony singing. She is an expert at creating songs that reflect personal and professional values in song.This has taken Corinne all over the world. Her personal work with CSR programs and connecting companies to community saw her working with Phil Collins's charity The Little Dreams Foundation in 2011 with MCI.

Corinne has volunteered with Children's charity organisations for 10 years and has conducted workshops and fundraising events all over Southeast Asia. She has worked with The Island Foundation for 7 years providing music workshops for children which assist them in preserving their heritage in song.

Corinne is currently working in several song writing collectives One Gener8ion and WGW ie: Wilson, Gibbons and Williams. She is the Global Choir Conductor for YOUTH4PLANET and will lead a global choir of children assembled to sing about climate action in this years Cop28 in Dubai.

== Discography ==
=== Albums ===
Song	Released	Label	Track list
"We've Only Just Begun"	2014	iTunes	(1) We've Only Just Begun(2)Yesterday Once More(3)On Top Of The World(4)Close To You(5)There's a Kind of Hush(6)For All We KNow(7)Superstar(8)Wont Last a Day Without You(9)Only Yesterday(10)Say Goodbye to Love
MELT	2009	iTunes	(1) Speak of the North; (2) Silver Flame; (3) Switch Off; (4) Precious Girl; (5) One Voice; (6) Life Goes; (7) Good Days; (8) Silty Wine; (9) Rise; (10) Melt
Dusk	2002	CDBaby, Secret Street	(1) East of the sun; (2) Something in the way she moves; (3) The look of love; (4) Close to you; (5) No moon at all; (6) I’ve never been in love before; (7) Phased out; (8) Little Wing
Sunday Afternoon	2001	N/A	(1) Dream tonight; (2) Big yellow taxi; (3) Phased out; (4) Show some emotion; (5) Like a hurricane; (6) Magic cape
