= Patrick Donachie =

Australian Paralympic swimmer

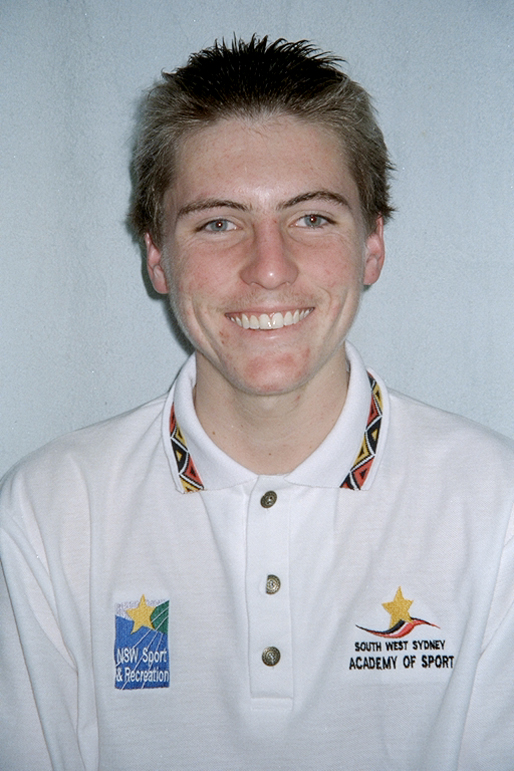
- 2000 Australian Paralympic team portrait of Donachie

Personal information
- Full name: Patrick Donachie
- Nationality: Australia
- Born: 24 April 1983 (age 43) Sydney, New South Wales
Medal record
Swimming
Paralympic Games
Gold medal – first place	2000 Sydney	Men's 4x100 m Freestyle S14

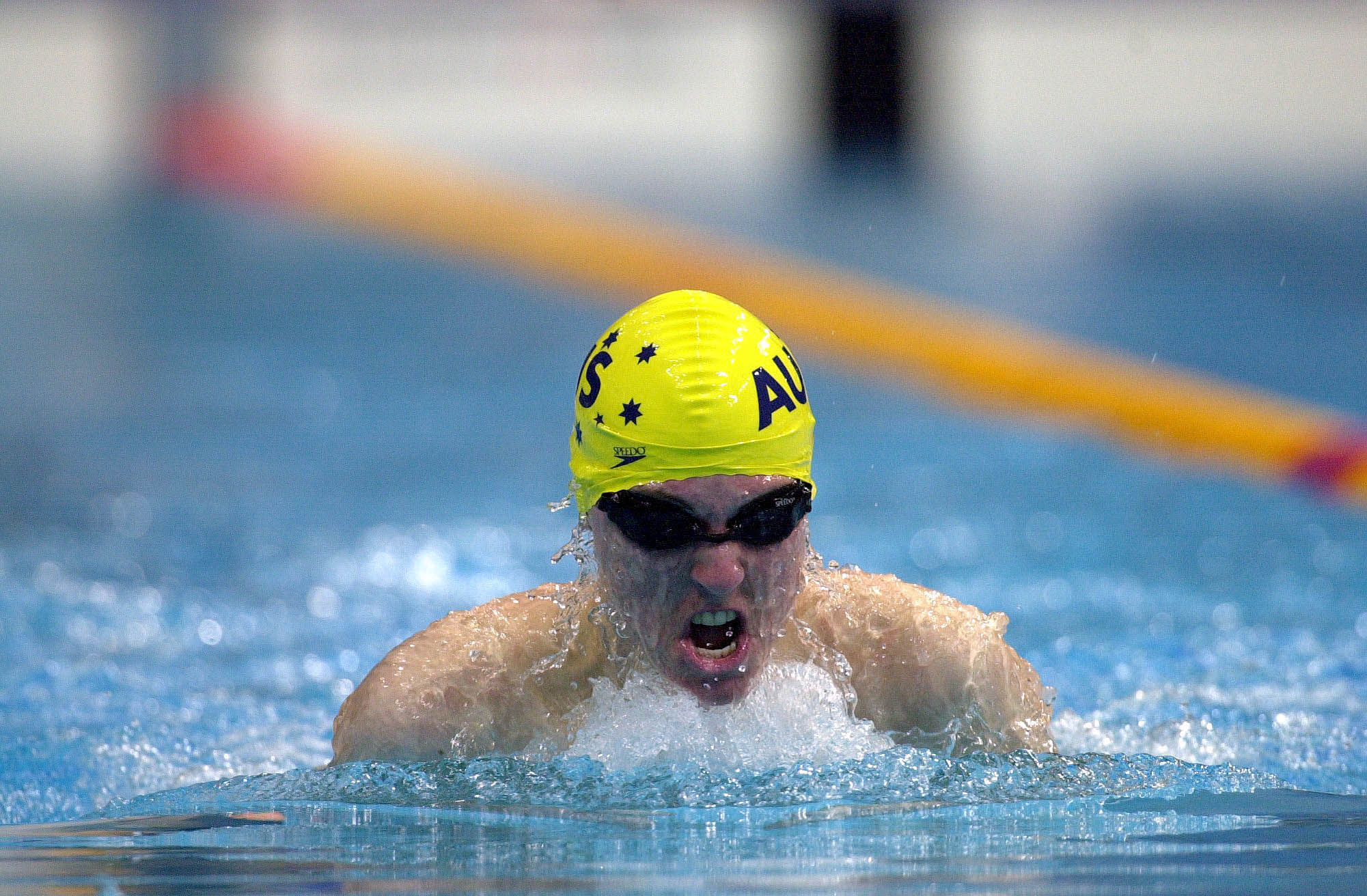
Action shot of Donachie in the pool at the 2000 Summer Paralympics

Patrick Donachie, OAM (born 24 April 1983 in Sydney, New South Wales) is an Australian Paralympic swimmer. He won a gold medal at the 2000 Sydney Games in the Men's 4 × 100 m Freestyle S14 event, for which he received a Medal of the Order of Australia. In 2000, he received an Australian Sports Medal.
