= Shamma Hamdan =

Emirati singer

- Born: April 28, 1994 (age 31)
- Origin: United Arab Emirates
- Genres: Khaliji
- Occupations: Singer, guitarist

Shamma Hamdan (28 April, 1994) is an Emirati singer of Khaliji music from Dubai. In 2012, she became the first Emirati woman ever to become a finalist in a season of Arabs Got Talent.

== Music career ==
=== Arabs Got Talent ===
At 18 years old, Hamdan appeared as the only Emirati contestant on Arabs Got Talent, a televised talent competition. While she advanced to the final rounds of the competition, Hamdan initially received criticism for her physical appearance early in the show's broadcast.

=== Artistic style ===
Hamdan performs music that has been described by critics as a mix of Khaleeji, flamenco, pop and rock. She is also recognised by a short, choppy haircut and plays the guitar.
