= Ossie Cruse =

Australian activist and elder

- Born: 1933; Orbost, Victoria, Australia
- Occupation(s): Activist and Aboriginal elder

Oswald "Ossie" Cruse MBE AM is an Australian activist and Aboriginal elder.

Cruse was born in 1933 in Orbost, Victoria. He became active in the area of Aboriginal rights after the 1967 Australian referendum, touring Africa with former prime minister Gough Whitlam and becoming a member of the World Council of Indigenous Peoples.

Cruse was created a Member of the Order of the British Empire in the 1977 Silver Jubilee and Birthday Honours and a Member of the Order of Australia in the 2001 Australia Day Honours.
