= Andrew Michelmore =

Australian rower

Personal information
- Born: Andrew Gordon Michelmore
- Years active: 1972–1979

Sport
- Sport: Rowing
- Club: Melbourne University Boat Club
Medal record
Men's rowing
Representing Australia
World Rowing Championships
Gold medal – first place	1974 Lucerne	Lwt men's four
Bronze medal – third place	1975 Nottingham	Lwt men's four

Andrew Gordon Michelmore, AO is an Australian lightweight rower. He won Australia's first rowing World Championship title – a gold medal at the 1974 World Rowing Championships in Lucerne with the lightweight men's four.

== Club, varsity and state rowing ==
Michelmore's senior rowing was from the Melbourne University Boat Club (MUBC). At the Australian Rowing Championships in 1972 he won a national championship title in the lightweight eight. He won another national title racing for MUBC in 1975 in a lightweight men's four.

He was selected in Victorian state representative lightweight fours to race the Penrith Cup at the Australian Rowing Championships in 1974 and 1975. Those crews won the interstate championship on both occasions.

Michelmore won a Rhodes Scholarship in 1976 and stroked the Oxford University Boat Club to consecutive Boat Race victories in 1977 and 1978. He was President of the Oxford Rowing Club in both those years. On his return from England he resumed his Australian rowing career and in 1979 won a national title for MUBC in a lightweight eight, was selected for Victoria and won the Interstate Championship in a lightweight four and was picked to represent at a third World Championship.

== National representative rowing ==
Michelmore was selected for Australian representative honours in a lightweight coxless four for the 1974 World Rowing Championships in Lucerne. That crew won Australia's first gold medal at a FISA World Rowing Championship. The following year at Nottingham 1975 that same crew were selected to defend their title. They came third, taking the bronze medal and were the best performing Australian crew at those championships. They became the first Australian crew to win successive medals at any world championships or FISA championships.

Following his Rhodes Scholarship and rowing success at Oxford, in 1979 he was selected for his third and final Australian representative crew in the men’s lightweight eight for Bled 1979. They placed sixth.

== Business career ==
Michelmore was the Chief Executive Officer of MMG Limited from 2009 until 2017. As at September 2026 he was the chairman of the Minerals Council of Australia.

== Honours ==
Michelmore was made an Officer of the Order of Australia (AO) in 2018 for services to the mining industry.
