= Helen Pickett =

American ballet choreographer

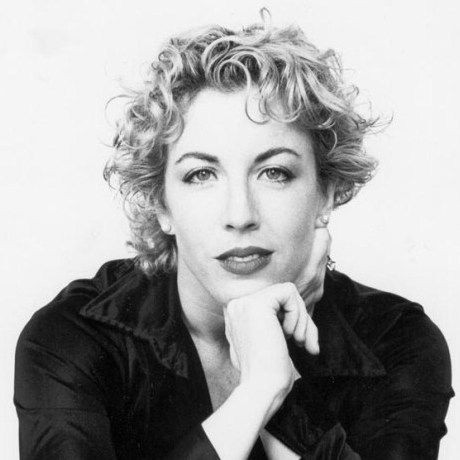
- Alma mater: Hollins University
- Occupation: Choreographer, workshop leader

Helen Pickett is an American choreographer for stage and film, and has been described as “one of the few prominent women in ballet today”. She earned her Masters of Fine Arts in Dance from Hollins University in 2011.

== Performing career ==
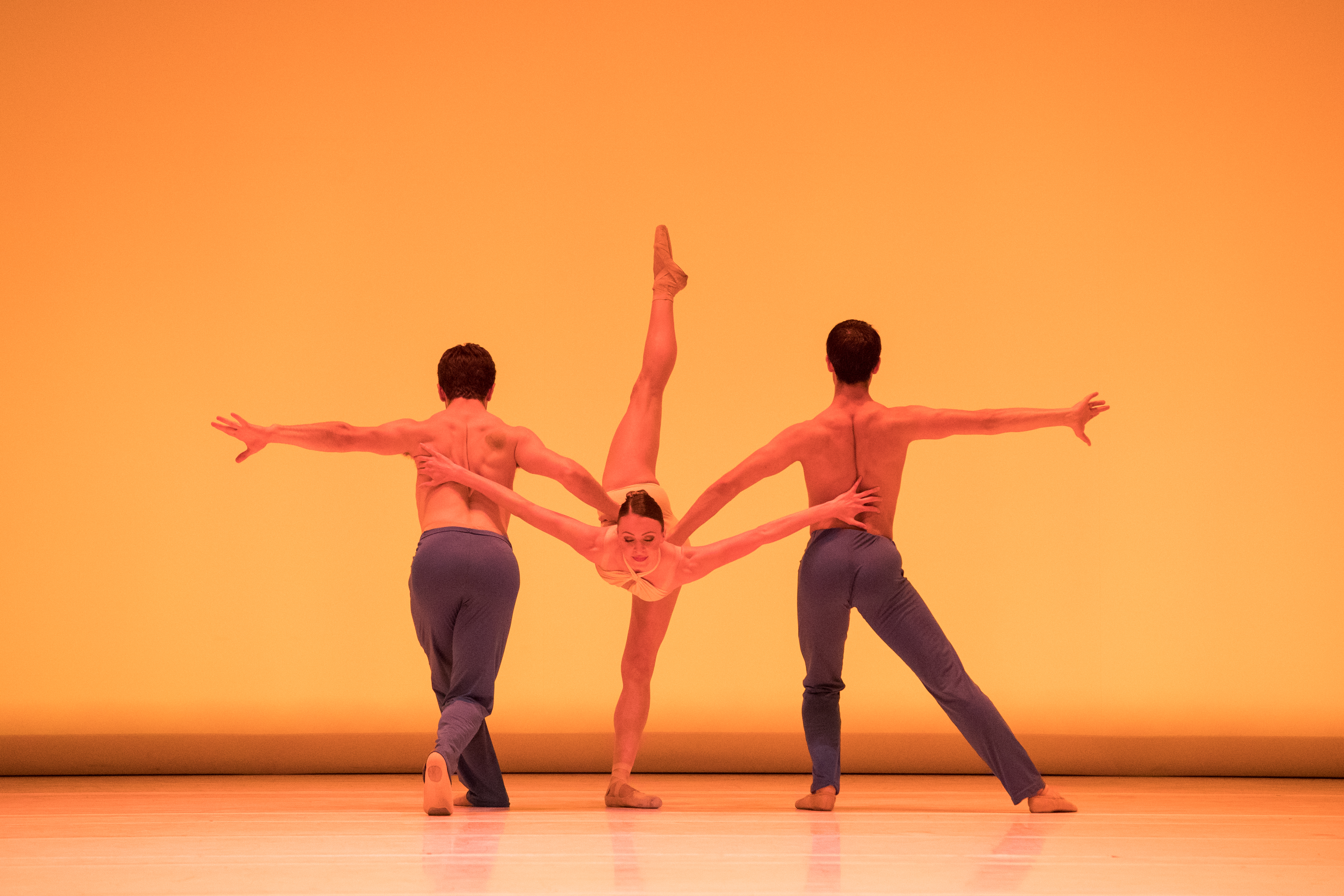
A still image of "Petal" choreographed by Helen Pickett

In 1987, Pickett joined William Forsythe’s Frankfurt Ballet, where she performed until 1998. She was an original cast member in many of Forsythe’s seminal works throughout her career, including her speaking role, Agnes, in Impressing the Czar in 2005. Pickett’s interest in acting took her to New York in 1998, where she joined The Wooster Group.

She studied acting for two years with Penny Templeton. From 2003-2007, she collaborated as an actress and choreographer with video artists such as Eve Sussman, Toni Dove, and Laurie Simmons. She was also a member of the Deep Ellum Ensemble in Dallas, Texas, from 2003 to 2005 under the direction of Matthew Earnest. Pickett was named in the list "25 to Watch" by Dance Magazine in 2007.

In 2005, Pickett stepped back into the speaking role of Agnes in Impressing the Czar by Forsythe. She also performed with the Royal Ballet of Flanders from 2005 until 2011, and with the Saxon State Opera in Dresden, Germany, from 2013 until 2017.

== Choreography ==
Pickett's choreographic debut was in 2005 with the Boston Ballet. She has choreographed over sixty ballets internationally, including 5 long form narratives: Camino Real for the Atlanta Ballet, The Crucible for the Scottish Ballet(11), Emma Bovary for The National Ballet of Canada, Crime and Punishment for American Ballet Theater and Lady Macbeth for Dutch National Ballet.

Pickett was resident choreographer for the Atlanta Ballet from 2012 to 2017.

The following are some of the repertoires where Pickett's choreography is included:

- Alberta Ballet
- American Ballet Theatre
- Aspen Santa Fe Ballet
- Atlanta Ballet
- Ballet West
- Ballet X
- Boston Ballet
- Charlotte Ballet
- Cincinnati Ballet
- Dance Theatre of Harlem
- Kansas City Ballet
- Oregon Ballet Theatre
- Philadelphia Ballet
- Pittsburgh Ballet Theatre
- Royal Ballet of Flanders
- Saxon State Opera
- Scottish Ballet
- Smuin Ballet
- Vienna State Ballet
- Dutch National Ballet
- National Ballet of Canada

In addition, she choreographed Les Troyens for the Chicago Lyric Opera, and an evening-length, musical with multimedia, Voices of the Amazon.

In 2020, Pickett's choreography pivoted to a series of five films created and rehearsed entirely in private living spaces on Zoom. She also choreographed a 2nd series of films called The Shakespeare Cycle, creating a total of 12 films.

== Teaching, motivational speaking and talk shows ==
Pickett has taught Forsythe Improvisation Modalities for schools and universities throughout the United States. She is also a motivational speaker who focuses on the topics of re-imagining creativity, supporting and building community, and inclusion. In May 2020, She founded Female Choreographers Big Roundtable, and she started a talk show known as Creative Vitality Jam Sessions, in which she has interviewed over 83 dance artists.

In 2021, she was the co-director for the Jacob's Pillow Contemporary Program. In 2016, Pickett received an Honorary Doctorate from University of North Carolina School of the Arts and became the First Visiting Distinguished Artist.
