= Clarissa Dalrymple =

Art curator

- Born: Clarissa Ainley; 1940 or 1941 (age 85–86); England
- Children: 3

Clarissa Dalrymple (born 1940/1941) is an independent art curator who lives in New York, New York. Dalrymple is credited with having curated early exhibitions of contemporary artists in the United States including Christopher Wool, Ashley Bickerton, Collier Schorr, Haim Steinbach, Nayland Blake, Michael Joaquin Grey, Jorge Pardo, Damien Hirst, Sarah Lucas, Tyler Turkle, Gary Hume, Rachel Whiteread, Neo Rauch, Adam McEwen, Nate Lowman and Ryan Sullivan.

The New York Times has described Dalrymple as being known for "an almost psychic ability to pinpoint who and what in art will matter next".

== Early life ==
She was born Clarissa Ainley to Henry "Sam" Ainley, a merchant seaman, journalist and restaurateur, and Angela Jeans, an actress and model, and they divorced when she was young. They lived in Walberswick, Suffolk, England. Her grandfather was the playwright Ronald Jeans, "a lesser Noel Coward" in her words.

== Early career (1983–1991) ==
=== Cable Gallery ===
In 1983, Clarissa Dalrymple and Nicole Klagsbrun opened Cable Gallery in New York City. Cable Gallery was the site of early solo exhibitions of Ashley Bickerton, Steve DiBenedetto, Collier Schorr, Haim Steinbach, Phillipe Thomas, Christopher Wool, Tyler Turkle and others. In 1986, Dalrymple and Klagsbrun invited artist Robert Gober to curate an exhibition at the gallery, Gober's first curatorial project.

Cable Gallery closed in 1988. Its brief lifespan was included by Jerry Saltz as one of the events comprising The New York Canon of Art from the forty-year period between 1968-2008.

=== Petersburg Gallery ===
From 1989 to 1991, Dalrymple formed a program of emerging artists for the Petersburg Gallery in New York. During this time, Dalrymple organized solo shows of Nayland Blake, David Dupuis, Michael Joaquin Gray, David Knudsvig, David Nelson, Jorge Pardo, Rene Ricard, and Billy Sullivan.

Dalrymple also organized the debut solo exhibition of Matthew Barney, which was scheduled to open at the Petersburg Gallery in 1991. However, two weeks before the show's opening, Petersburg Gallery's owners closed its doors. The exhibition was instead presented at Barbara Gladstone's gallery, who had invited Dalrymple to work with her on projects with younger artists. Barney continues to be represented by Gladstone Gallery.

== Young British Artists (YBAs) (1992) ==
In 1992, Clarissa Dalrymple co-curated the first exhibition of Young British Artists (YBAs) in the United States with Barbara Gladstone and Richard Flood.

The exhibition occurred at Stein Gladstone Gallery and Barbara Gladstone Gallery in New York's SoHo neighborhood, and included artists Lea Andrews, Keith Coventry, Anya Gallaccio, Liam Gillick, Damien Hirst, Gary Hume, Abigail Lane, Sarah Lucas, Steven Pippin, Marc Quinn, Rachel Whiteread, and Marcus Taylor. In 1995, Richard Flood, then chief curator at the Walker Arts Center, organized Brilliant!, New Work From London, an expanded version of the show.

== Independent curator (1993–present) ==
Since 1993, Dalrymple has worked as a private advisor and independent curator, curating solo and group exhibitions at museums, alternative non-profit spaces, and commercial galleries. These include: MoMA PS1, Queens, New York; White Columns, New York; Mary Boone Gallery, New York; Marc Selwyn Fine Art, Los Angeles; Nicole Klagsbrun, New York; Regen Projects, Los Angeles; Marianne Boesky, New York; Sadie Coles HQ, London; VeneKlasen/Werner, Berlin; Xavier Hufkens in Brussels; and C24 Gallery in New York.

== Personal life ==
In 1969, she married the writer Dennis Dalrymple. She has three sons. The third, Jesse (born 1971), was with the film director Jim McBride. The older two are Joe Ainley, a lawyer in San Jose, California, and Bo Allingham, a pest-control expert in England.

Dalrymple, credited under the name Ainley, features in two of McBride's films: My Girlfriend's Wedding (1969) and Pictures From Life's Other Side (1971).
