= 2001 in architecture =

The year 2001 in architecture involved some significant architectural events and new buildings.

== Events ==
- January 13 – Biblioteca Gallardo, one of the most important libraries in Central America, is among buildings destroyed in the January 2001 El Salvador earthquake.
- February 11 – Three Rivers Stadium, in Pittsburgh, United States, home of the Pittsburgh Pirates and Steelers, is demolished.
- April – Proposals for the Grollo Tower in Melbourne, Australia, projected to become the tallest in the world at this time, are rejected by the local authority.
- September 11 – September 11 attacks: World Trade Center in New York City (designed by Minoru Yamasaki) is destroyed, and The Pentagon is heavily damaged by hijacked airliners. In New York, St. Nicholas Greek Orthodox Church is completely destroyed; and the Deutsche Bank Building and Fiterman Hall are subsequently demolished due to severe damage.
- December 15 – Preservation efforts having been completed on the Leaning Tower of Pisa, it reopens to the public after 12 years of reconstruction.
- unknown date – 6a architects is established by Stephanie Macdonald and Tom Emerson in London.

== Buildings and structures ==
=== Buildings opened ===
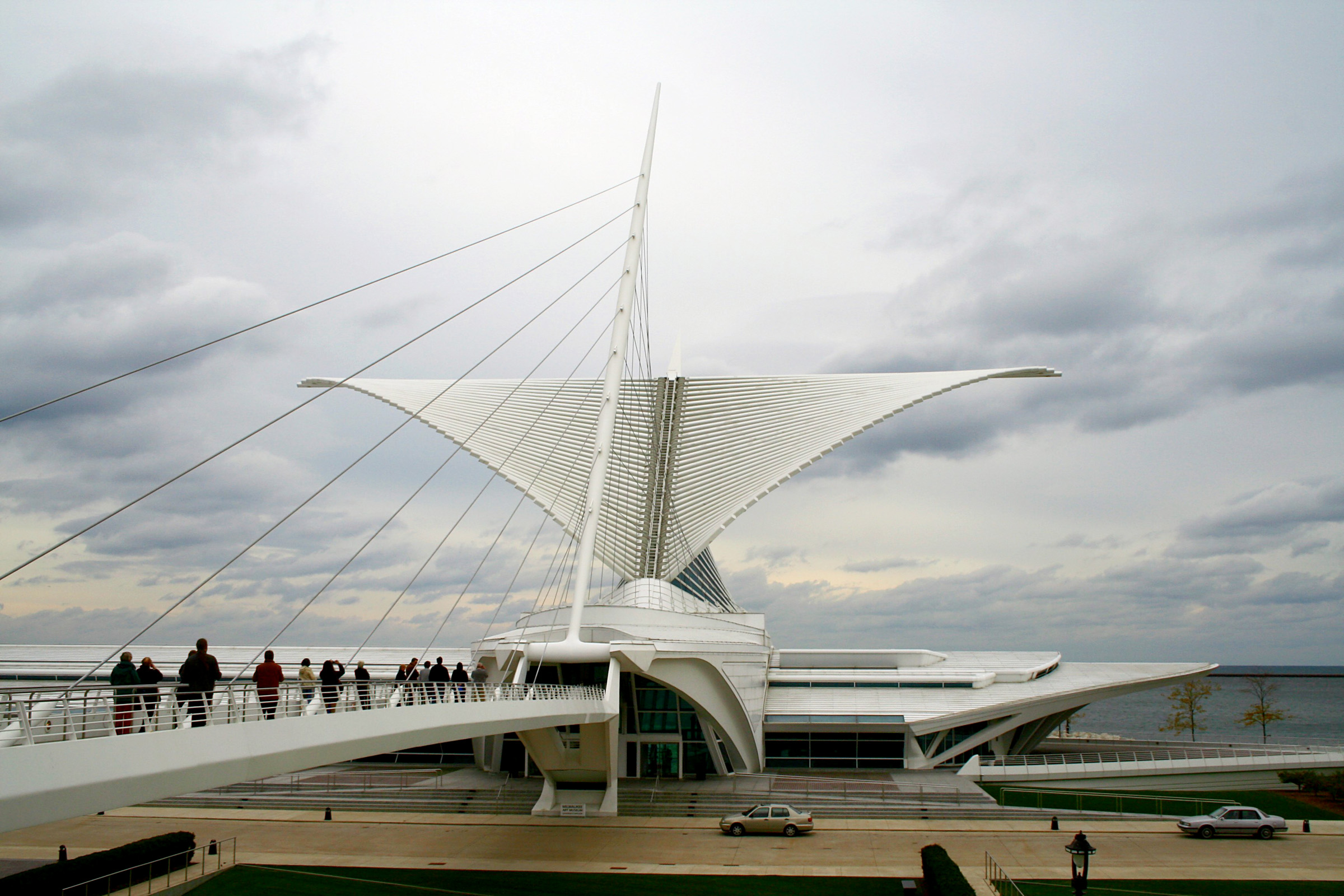
Milwaukee Art Museum

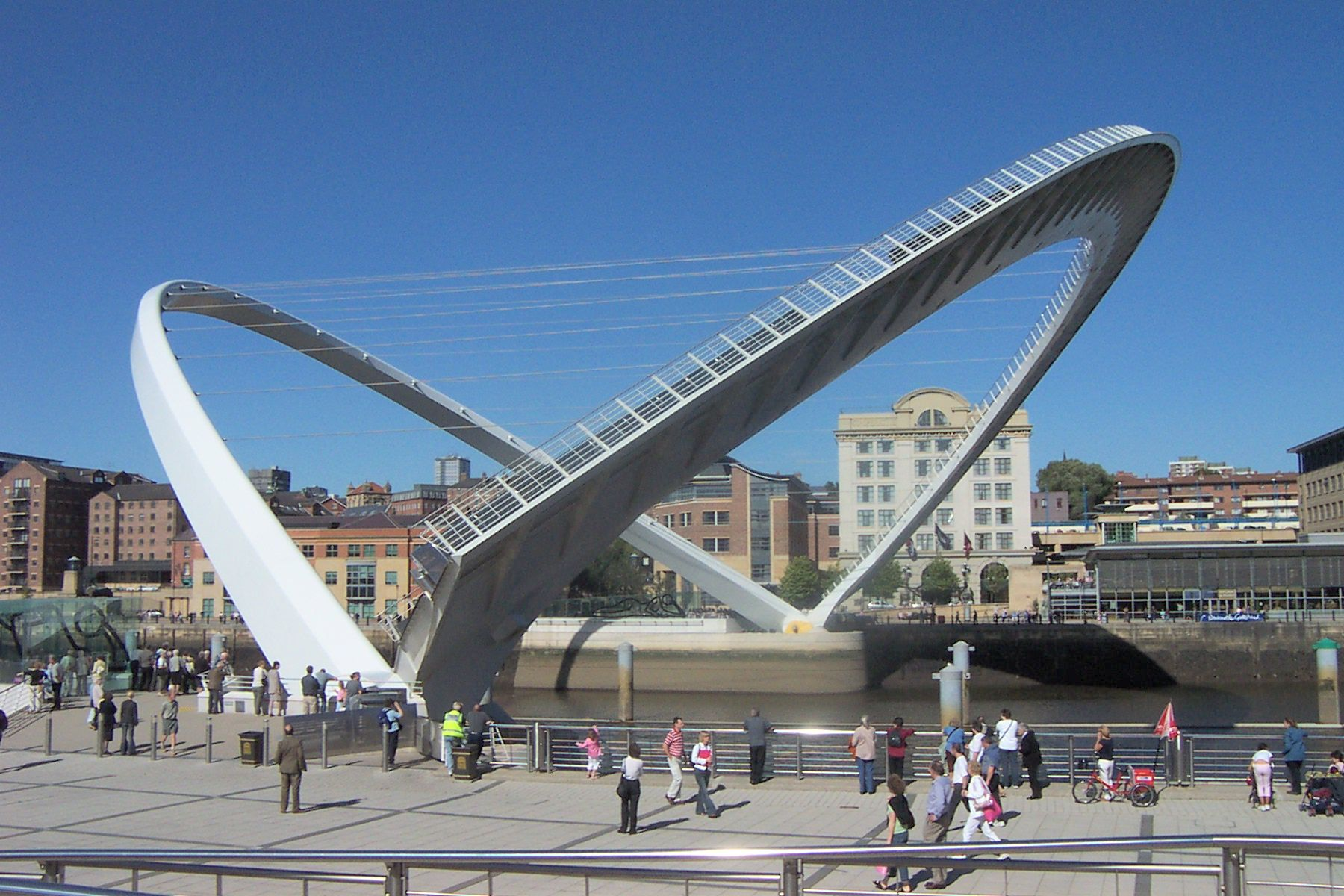
Gateshead Millennium Bridge

- January 26 – Sendai Mediatheque, Japan, designed by Toyo Ito.
- March 11 – National Museum of Australia in Canberra, designed by Howard Raggatt
- March 17 – Eden Project, St Austell, Cornwall, UK, designed by Nicholas Grimshaw & Partners.
- April – Magna Science Adventure Centre, Rotherham, Yorkshire, UK, designed by Wilkinson Eyre. It wins this year's Stirling Prize.
- May 4
  - Milwaukee Art Museum opens the Quadracci Pavilion, the first completed American project by Santiago Calatrava.
  - Sultan Qaboos Grand Mosque opens in Muscat, Oman.
- June 28 – Gehry Tower (designed by Frank Gehry) in Hanover, Germany.
- June 30 – National Space Centre, Leicester, England, by Nicholas Grimshaw & Partners.
- September 9
  - Jewish Museum, designed by Daniel Libeskind, Berlin, Germany.
  - National Museum of Ireland's Museum of Country Life, Turlough, County Mayo, designed by Des Byrne of Architecture Services, Office of Public Works, is opened.
- September 17 – Gateshead Millennium Bridge, a pedestrian tilt bridge for spanning the River Tyne, UK, designed by architects Wilkinson Eyre and structural engineers Gifford. It wins the 2002 Stirling Prize.
- September 23 – Saint Gregory the Illuminator Cathedral, Yerevan (Armenian Apostolic Church), designed by Stepan Kurkchyan.
- November – Kodak Theatre in Hollywood, constructed to host the Academy Awards.
- November 15 – Palms Casino Resort in Paradise, Nevada, USA, designed by The Jerde Partnership.
- November 21 – Cologne Tower inaugurated; designed by Kohl & Kohl and Jean Nouvel.
- December 10 – Puente de la Mujer, a pedestrian swing cantilever spar cable-stayed bridge spanning a dock in Buenos Aires, Argentina, designed by Santiago Calatrava, inaugurated.
- December 11 – American Folk Art Museum in New York City, USA, inaugurated; designed by Tod Williams Billie Tsien Architects.
- date unknown
  - Apartheid Museum in Johannesburg
  - Neue Galerie New York, opened in the William Starr Miller House, New York City, United States.

=== Buildings completed ===
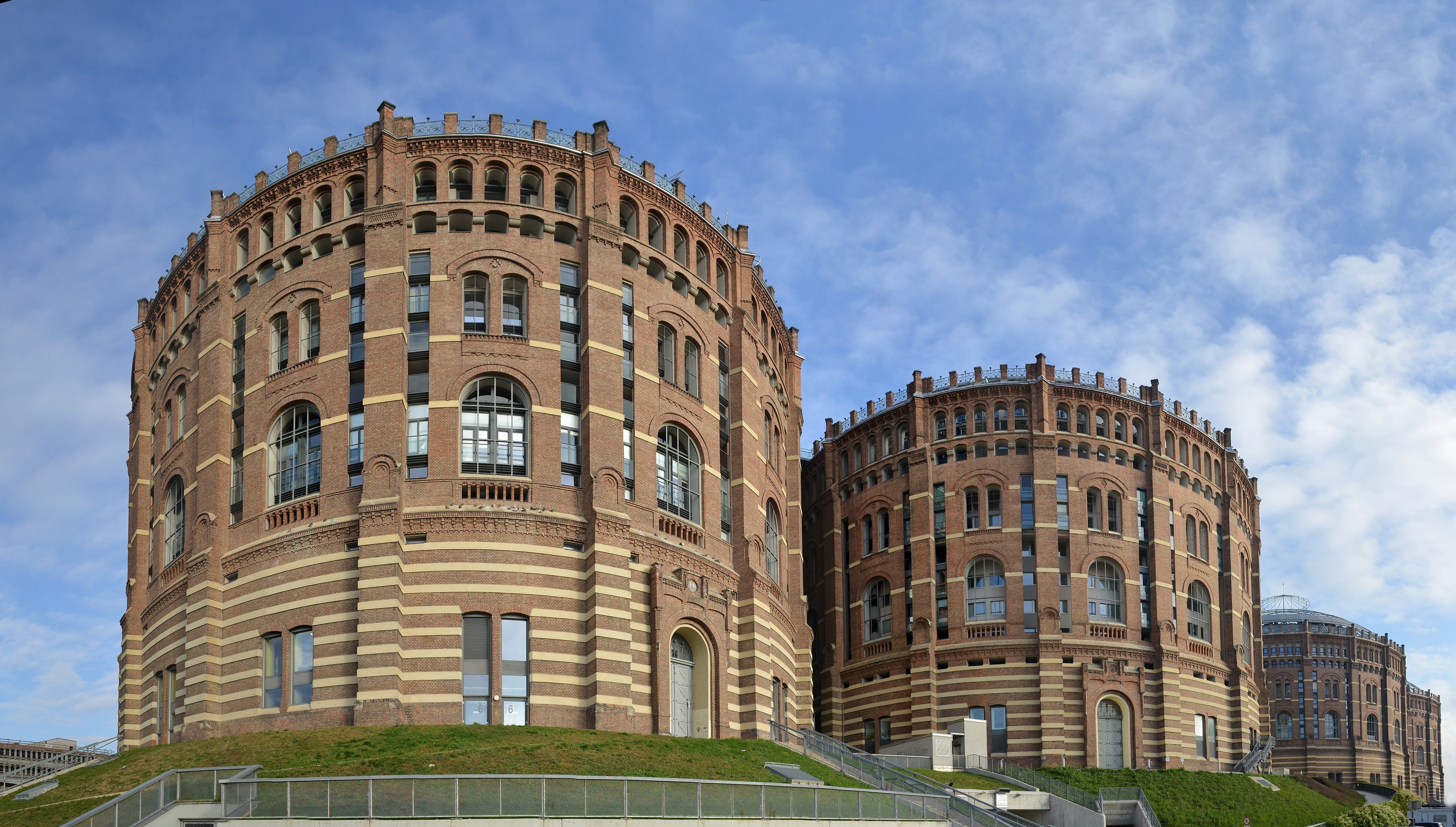
The Gasometer, Vienna, Austria

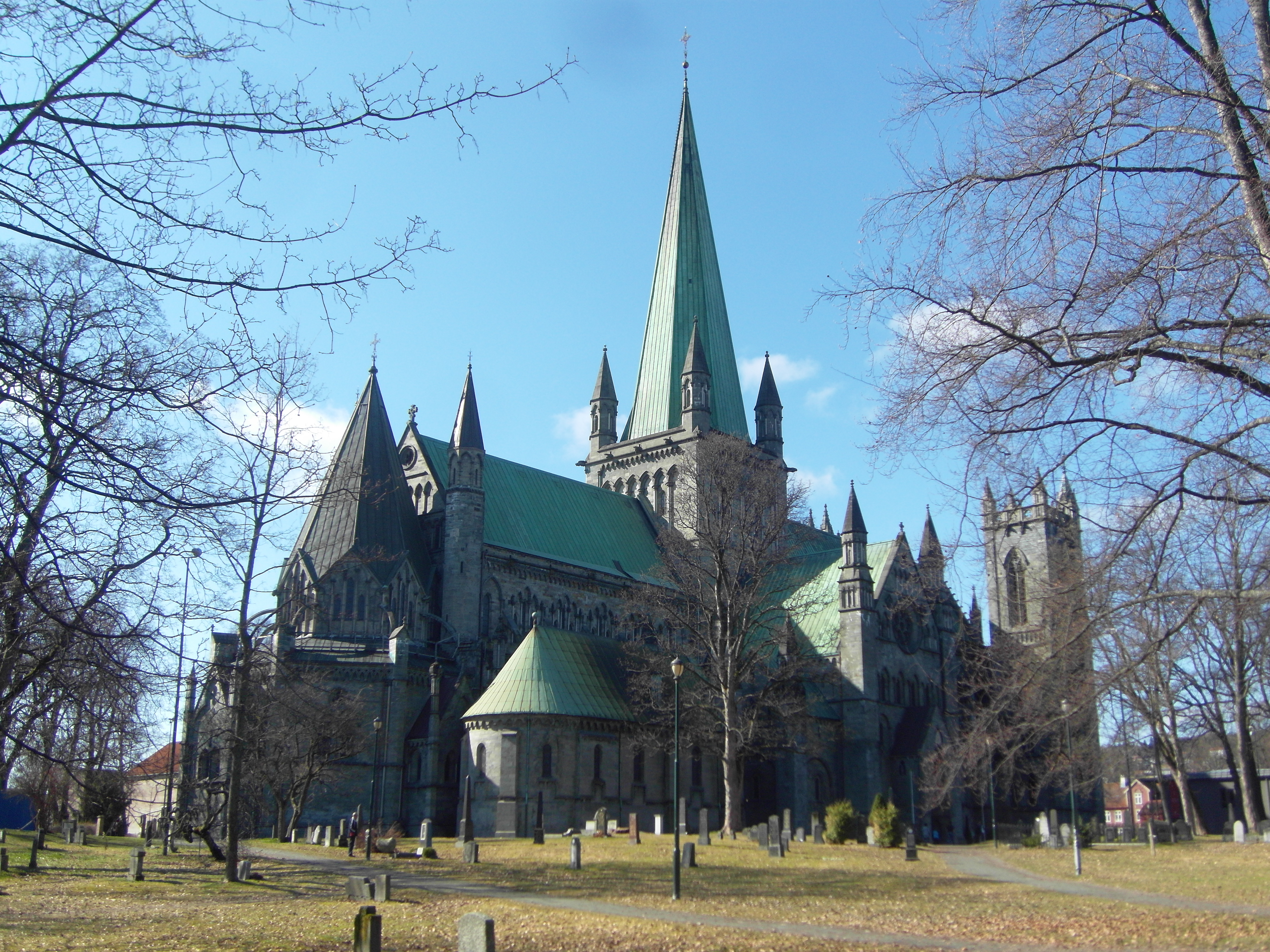
Nidaros Cathedral in Trondheim, Norway

- October 30 – Redevelopment of Gasometer, Vienna, by Jean Nouvel, Coop Himmelb(l)au, Manfred Wehdorn and Wilhelm Holzbauer is completed.
- date unknown
  - 88 Wood Street office building, City of London, by Richard Rogers.
  - Caja General de Ahorros, Granada, by Alberto Campo Baeza.
  - Betty and Gordon Moore Library in the Centre for Mathematical Sciences (Cambridge), UK, designed by Edward Cullinan Architects.
  - Bibliotheca Alexandrina in Alexandria, Egypt
  - DG Bank building in Berlin, Germany, by Frank Gehry.
  - Telekom Tower building, in Kuala Lumpur, Malaysia.
  - One Wall Centre opens in Vancouver, British Columbia, Canada, by architects Perkins+Will Canada.
  - Ku’damm-Eck (office building) in Berlin, Germany, by Gerkan, Marg und Partner.
  - Neues Kranzler Eck (office building) in Berlin, Germany, by Helmut Jahn.
  - Tower 2000, the first building in the Moscow International Business Centre, Russia.
  - Nidaros Cathedral, Trondheim, Norway (officially completed)
  - Exhibition building at Scotland's National Museum of Rural Life completed by Page\Park Architects.
  - Building D, Giudecca, Venice, by Cino Zucchi.
  - Jacobs Ladder (house) at Chinnor, England, by Niall McLaughlin Architects.

== Awards ==
- Aga Khan Award for Architecture – Geoffrey Bawa
- AIA Gold Medal – Michael Graves
- Architecture Firm Award – Herbert Lewis Kruse Blunck Architecture
- Emporis Skyscraper Award – One Wall Centre
- European Union Prize for Contemporary Architecture (Mies van der Rohe Prize) – Rafael Moneo for Kursaal Centre
- Grand Prix de l'urbanisme – Jean-Louis Subileau
- Mies van der Rohe Prize – Rafael Moneo
- Praemium Imperiale Architecture Laureate – Jean Nouvel
- Pritzker Prize – Jacques Herzog and Pierre de Meuron
- Prix de l'Équerre d'Argent – Jacques Herzog and Pierre de Meuron
- RAIA Gold Medal – Keith Cottier
- RIBA Royal Gold Medal – Jean Nouvel
- Stirling Prize – Wilkinson Eyre Architects for Magna Centre, Rotherham
- Thomas Jefferson Medal in Architecture – Glenn Murcutt
- Twenty-five Year Award – Weyerhaeuser Headquarters
- Vincent Scully Prize – Andres Duany and Elizabeth Plater-Zyberk

== Deaths ==
- January 11 – Denys Lasdun, British architect (born 1914)
- January 18 – Morris Lapidus, US Neo-baroque Miami Modern architect (born 1902)
- February 4 – Iannis Xenakis, Greek-French composer, music theorist, and architect-engineer (born 1922)
- March 14 – Robert S. McMillan, US architect, co-founder of The Architects Collaborative (born 1916)
- December 30 – Samuel Mockbee, US architect (born 1944)

== See also ==
- Timeline of architecture
