= Hilary Lloyd =

English artist (born 1964)

- Born: 1964; Halifax
- Occupation: video artist

Hilary Lloyd is an English artist working in video, sound, sculpture, painting and installation. Her exhibition of film and video at Raven Row arts centre was nominated for the Turner Prize in 2011.

== Biography ==
She was born in 1964 in Halifax and studied art at the Newcastle Polytechnic. She now works and lives in London while researching at Central Saint Martins and has exhibited internationally in cities such as New York, Venice and Basel.

== Work ==
Hilary Lloyd's work is derived from her observation of people, objects, and spaces. She says that her work does not need to be understood, and that she often does not understand it herself. She purposefully films people who are aware that they are being filmed and act accordingly. This allows for an element of personification in her work mimicking a self portrait. Her artistic interests consist of architecture, fashion, textiles, and colour. All of her work illustrates her motif as isolated. Sometimes her compositions seem as if they were posed, and some of her other works look like she was at a great distance observing and recording. Her work is entangled with the idea of repetitive movement and minimal materiality. Lloyd's video instillations are made to be continuous with the intention of the start and end of the work being conditional upon the viewer. She takes an unpolished, hands-on approach to filmmaking with her favourite medium being a mobile phone. Lloyd does not consider herself to be a filmmaker, rather an artist who uses film as a tool to create art. Her work encapsulates the wider temporal experience of the viewer with physical space playing an important role. Typically Lloyd will create an immersive experience for the viewer through this use of space, often influencing their movement through her art. The equipment that has been used to display her images include: monitors, projectors, stands, and cabling. Lloyd prefers to use versatile technological equipment in her work for both aesthetic purposes and convenience. In 2020, Dr James Fox made a personal tour of “some of the most profound artworks from Tate Britain’s collection” for BBC television and included Lloyd’s video piece, One Minute of Water, 1999. This captures sunlight reflecting off water, shown on a Sony monitor on a one-minute loop. “It is spell-binding,” Fox remarked, indicative of “the kind of beauty to be found anywhere”. During the coronavirus lockdown in May 2020 gallerist Sadie Coles curated a mixed exhibition online which included Lloyd’s 1999 video titled Rich.

== Exhibitions ==
- Car Park, Sadie Coles HQ, London (2019)
- Theatre, Focal Point Gallery, Southend on Sea (2017)
- Awful Girls, Dorich House Museum, London (2017)
- Woodall, Temple Bar Gallery, Dublin (2017)
- Blaffer Art Museum, Houston (2016)
- Robot, Sadie Coles HQ, London (2015)
- Balfour, Sadie Coles HQ, London (2015)
- Museum für Gegenwartskunst, Basel (2012)
- Sadie Coles HQ, London (2011)
- Artists Space, New York (2011)
- The Turner Prize (2011)
- Raven Row, London (2010)
- Tramway, Glasgow (2009)
- Le Consortium, Dijon (2009)
- Studio #2, Frieze Art Fair, London (2009)
- Sadie Coles HQ, London (2008)
- Films, Sadie Coles HQ, London (2008)
- Kunstverein München, München (2006)
