= Stephanie Macdonald =

British architect

Stephanie Macdonald OBE
- Born: 15 October 1966 (age 60); Lewisham, England
- Education: Croydon College of Art, Portsmouth School of Art, Mackintosh School of Architecture, Royal College of Art, University of North London
- Occupation: architect
- Years active: 2001–present
- Known for: 6a architects
- Notable work: Raven Row, South London Gallery, Studio for Juergen Teller, Cowan Court Churchill College Cambridge
- Partner: Tom Emerson
- Awards: RIBA Awards (2011,14, 17), Schelling Medal 2012
- Website: www.6a.co.uk

Stephanie Macdonald OBE (born 15 October 1966 in Lewisham, London) is a British architect. She co-founded architecture firm 6a architects with Tom Emerson in 2001. She was appointed Officer of the Order of the British Empire (OBE) in the 2021 New Year Honours for services to architecture.

== Early life and education ==
The eldest of twelve children, Stephanie Macdonald was born in Lewisham, in the outskirts of London. She attended schools in Purley until leaving at a young age to work as a clerk in banking and insurance in the City of London. She completed her Art Foundation through night school at Croydon College of Art, while working nightshifts at a supermarket. Afterwards, she studied environmental art at Portsmouth School of Art, where she began to develop an interest in architecture. Following her interest in art, she enrolled at Glasgow School of Art, but changed to architecture in the second year moving to the Mackintosh School of Architecture.

In 1994, Macdonald embarked on postgraduate studies at the Royal College of Art, where she met her life and business partner Tom Emerson. It was there that they met artist Richard Wentworth, who would become a fundamental influence on their architectural practices. She obtained her diploma at the University of North London (now London Metropolitan University) in 1997 where she was taught by Caruso St John.

== Architecture career ==
In 2001, Macdonald and Emerson founded 6a architects. Their work was brought to prominence with the renovation of the grade-I listed Raven Row gallery in East London and the fire station at the South London Gallery. Subsequent projects have included the MK Gallery in Milton Keynes, Juergen Teller's Studio and international commissions such as two mixed-use towers in Hamburg, Germany. 6a architects projects often involve collaborations with art galleries, cultural institutions and artists, which Macdonald explains results from their connections with artists, writers and designers whilst at art and architecture school.

Macdonald has spoken about her experiences as a woman in architecture, stating that ‘the profession is not made in women's image' but notes that a lot is being done to counteract this. She was shortlisted in the Architect of the Year category for her work on Cowan Court in the 2018 Women in Architecture Awards. She was also listed as one of the Evening Standard London's most influential people 2018 in the category of architecture and was featured in a 2021 article on women architects in the Daily Telegraph.

== Personal life ==
Stephanie Macdonald lives in London with her partner Tom Emerson and their son Laurie, born in 1999.

== Projects ==
- Oki-ni, Savile Row, London, 2001
- Raven Row, Contemporary Art Exhibition Centre, Spitalfields, London, 2009
- South London Gallery, London, 2010
- Fashion Galleries, Victoria & Albert Museum, London, 2012
- Romney's House, Hampstead, London, 2012
- Tree House, London, London, 2013
- Façade for Paul Smith, Albemarle Street, London, 2013
- Studio for Juergen Teller, London, 2016
- Cowan Court, Churchill College Cambridge, 2015–16
- Black Stone Building, London, 2017
- Coastal House, Devon, 2017
- Blue Mountain School, London, 2018
- MK Gallery, Milton Keynes, 2019

== Bibliography ==
- Never Modern by 6a architects and Irénée Scalbert, Park Books, Zurich, 2013, ISBN 978-3-906027-24-1
- 6a architects 2009–17, El Croquis, no. 192, 2017, ISBN 978-84-947754-0-6
