= Tom Emerson (architect) =

British architect (born 1970)

Tom Emerson OBE
- Born: 29 September 1970 (age 56); France
- Education: University of Cambridge, University of Bath, Royal College of Art
- Occupation: architect
- Years active: 2001–present
- Known for: 6a architects
- Notable work: Raven Row, South London Gallery, Studio for Juergen Teller, Cowan Court Churchill College Cambridge, MK Gallery
- Partner: Stephanie Macdonald
- Awards: RIBA Awards (2011,14, 17, 19, 21, 23), Schelling Medal 2012, Tessenow Gold Medal 2023, Conrad Ferdinand Meyer Prize 2018
- Website: www.6a.co.ukwww.emerson.arch.ethz.ch

Thomas Vincent Emerson OBE (born 29 September 1970 in France) is a British architect based in London and Zürich. His practice, 6a architects, founded with Stephanie Macdonald in 2001 is best known for designing buildings for the arts and education for which it has won several RIBA Awards, the Schelling Medal for architecture. and the Tessenow Medal 2023. Alongside practice he is professor of architecture at the Department of Architecture, ETH Zurich. He was appointed Officer of the Order of the British Empire (OBE) in the 2021 New Year Honours for services to architecture and education. In 2023 Emerson and Macdonald were elected Royal Academicians by the Royal Academy in London.

== Education ==
Emerson was born in France and brought up in Belgium. He came to the United Kingdom to study architecture at the University of Bath, the University of Cambridge and at the Royal College of Art where he met his partner Macdonald.

== Architectural work ==
In 2001, Emerson founded 6a architects alongside Macdonald. Projects have included Raven Row, 2009, South London Gallery 2010-18 incorporating a garden by Gabriel Orozco and the conversion of the Fire Station, the V&A fashion gallery, Sadie Coles HQ in London and MK Gallery in Milton Keynes winner of an RIBA South Award in 2021. The studio complex for Juergen Teller won RIBA London Building of the Year 2017 and was nominated for the Stirling Prize 2017. 6a architects' competition-winning design for a new court at Churchill College Cambridge was completed in 2016. Works by 6a architects are particularly noted for their use of materials of strong relationship to landscape and gardens.

== Academic work and teaching ==
Since 2010 he has been Professor of Architecture and Construction at the ETH Zurich Faculty of Architecture. As part of his teaching and research on landscape and making, his students produced the Pavilion of Reflections floating on Lake Zurich for Manifesta 11 and urban landscape studies on Forst, Galway and Glasgow which was exhibited at Glasgow International in 2016. He was Dean of the Department of Architecture 2021-23. Before ETH Zurich, he taught architecture at the Architectural Association (2000–04) and the University of Cambridge (2004–10). He was awarded the Conrad Ferdinand Meyer Prize in 2018 for his academic work with ETH.

Emerson has published a collection of essays as Dirty Old River, Park Books, 2025 and several academic journal articles including for AA Files, as well as articles for Architects' Journal.

== Personal life ==
Tom Emerson lives in London and Zürich. In London, he lives with his partner Stephanie Macdonald.

== Projects by 6a architects ==
- Oki-ni, Savile Row, London, 2001
- Raven Row, Contemporary Art Exhibition Centre, Spitalfields, London, 2009
- South London Gallery, London, 2010
- Fashion Galleries, Victoria & Albert Museum, London, 2012
- Romney's House, Hampstead, London, 2012
- Tree House, London, London, 2013
- Façade for Paul Smith, Albemarle Street, London, 2013
- Studio for Juergen Teller, London, 2016
- Cowan Court, Churchill College Cambridge, 2015–16
- Black Stone Building, London, 2017
- Coastal House, Devon, 2017
- Blue Mountain School, London, 2018
- MK Gallery, Milton Keynes, 2019
- Holborn House Community Centre including Great Things Lie Ahead 2020 with Caragh Thuring, 2022
- CARA, Centre for Art, Research and Alliances, New York, 2022
- Skinners' Hall, City of London, 2025

== Bibliography ==
- 6a architects 2018–26, El Croquis, no. 236, 2026, ISBN 979-1399178814
- Dirty Old River by Tom Emerson, Park Books, Zurich, 2025, ISBN 978-3-03860-404-4
- 6a architects 2001–22, A+U, no, 623, ISBN 978-49-002128-0-0
- Never Modern by 6a architects and Irénée Scalbert, Park Books, Zurich, 2013, ISBN 978-3-906027-24-1
- 6a architects 2009–17, El Croquis, no. 192, 2017, ISBN 978-84-947754-0-6
