= Sadie Coles HQ =

Contemporary art gallery in London

Coordinates: 51.50857°N 0.1516°W

Sadie Coles HQ is a contemporary art gallery in London, owned and directed by Sadie Coles. The gallery focuses on presenting the work of established and emerging international artists. It was at the forefront of the Young British Artists movement.

== History ==
Sadie Coles HQ opened in April 1997 and has since operated from a variety of distinctive spaces. Its inaugural exhibition at 35 Heddon Street, by American painter John Currin, was followed by Sarah Lucas's exhibition The Law in lofts on St John Street. Sadie Coles's first gallery was located in Heddon Street, London, next to where the cover for David Bowie's album The Rise and Fall of Ziggy Stardust and the Spiders from Mars was photographed.

Between 2010 and 2013, Sadie Coles HQ was located at both New Burlington Place – a 5,000 square feet (460 square metres) space on the site of Nigel Greenwood's gallery during the 1980s and 90s – and on South Audley Street.

In 2013, Sadie Coles HQ moved to its current location, a 6,000 square feet (560 square metres) first floor gallery on Kingly Street in what was formerly the La Valbonne nightclub. In November 2015, it opened a third location in a glass-fronted 3,000 square feet (280 square metres) space on Davies Street in Mayfair designed by 6a architects.

Since her inaugural exhibition, Coles has followed the same formula for each of her invitations. Taking the graphic identity of the gallery itself – a grey block that represents the gallery space and is found on all her branded material – she uses the same block on the invitations, allowing each artist to choose their own colour. A piece of the artist's work is then shown on the inside of the card.

In 2014, Sadie Coles was listed as one of 'the most powerful people in the art world' by The Guardian.

From February to December 2012, Situation, a temporary space, showed works by Sarah Lucas. The extended display included works both new and historical, mainly by Lucas and occasionally involving other artists.

== Artists ==
Sadie Coles HQ represents numerous living artists, including:

- Alvaro Barrington
- Steve Dowson
- Sarah Lucas (since 1997)
- Carl Andre
- Matthew Barney
- Avner Ben-Gal
- Frank Benson
- John Bock
- Don Brown
- Spartacus Chetwynd
- Steven Claydon
- John Currin
- Sam Durant
- Angus Fairhurst
- Urs Fischer
- Jonathan Horowitz
- David Korty
- Gabriel Kuri
- Jim Lambie
- Lawrence Lek
- Hilary Lloyd
- Sarah Lucas
- Helen Marten
- Hellen van Meene
- Victoria Morton
- JP Munro
- Laura Owens
- Simon Periton
- Raymond Pettibon
- Elizabeth Peyton
- Richard Prince
- Ugo Rondinone
- Wilhelm Sasnal
- Gregor Schneider
- Daniel Sinsel
- Andreas Slominski
- Christiana Soulou
- Rudolf Stingel
- Ryan Sullivan
- Martine Syms (since 2017)
- Nicola Tyson
- Paloma Varga Weisz
- TJ Wilcox
- Jordan Wolfson
- Andrea Zittel

In addition, the gallery manages various artist estates, including:

- William N. Copley
