= Avner Ben-Gal =

Israeli artist (1966–2024)

Avner Ben-Gal (Hebrew: אבנר בן-גל; August 26, 1966 – May 9, 2024) was an Israeli international painter and artist, working mainly from Tel Aviv, Israel. His works depict various intense, often neglected locations such as agricultural fields, prisons and smoky interiors, whereby theatrical scenes play out. The scenes present ghostly, rough hewn and often low life figures that are bare and hardened. The parallel between Ben-Gal's raw way of painting and his tough, ambiguous subject matter allows a unique intensity within his paintings.

== Biography ==
Avner Ben-Gal was born on 26 August 1966. He studied Fine Art at Bezalel Academy of Art and Design, Jerusalem in 1993. Ben-Gal was the subject of solo shows at museums such as the Tel Aviv Museum of Art (2002, 2009); Museum für Gegenwartskunst, Basel, Switzerland (2008); and Sudden Poverty at the Aspen Art Museum, Colorado, United States (2007); and he has participated in various group shows, including DARK at the Museum Boijmans Van Beuningen, Rotterdam, and as part of the Venice Biennial, 2003. A number of books have been published on his work, notably a catalogue to accompany his 2008 show in Basel.

Ben-Gal was later represented by Sadie Coles HQ London, Bortolami Gallery, New York, CFA Gallery, Berlin and by Tempo Rubato gallery, Tel Aviv. He died from a heart attack on 9 May 2024, at the age of 57.

== Prizes and awards ==
2001 Residency program at The Elizabeth Foundation for the Arts, New York (NY), USA

1998 Minister of Education and Cultural Prize, Israel

1996 Kollner award for excellent young artists, Bezalel Academy, Jerusalem, Israel

1993 Mary Fischer award for excellent young artists, Bezalel Academy, Jerusalem, Israel

== Selected solo exhibitions ==
2013

- The Rover, CFA Gallery, Berlin

2012

- Sadie Coles HQ, London

2010

- Smackville, Bortolami, NY

2009

- Tel Aviv Museum of Art, Israel

2008

- Fabio Tiboni, Bologna, Italy
- Sadie Coles HQ, London
- Kunstmuseum Basel, Museum für Gegenwartskunst, Switzerland

2007

- Aspen Art Museum, Aspen, Colorado

2006

- Bortolami Dayan, New York

2005

- Sadie Coles HQ, London
- Cursed By Slaves, Nouvelles Images Gallery, The Hague, Holland

2002

- Helena, The Helena Rubinstein Pavilion of Art, Tel Aviv Museum of Art, Tel Aviv, Israel

2001

- The Eve of Destruction, Tal Esther Gallery, Tel Aviv, Israel

1999

- New Army, Mary Fauzi Gallery, Tel Aviv, Israel

1998

- Curly Drugs, the Artists’ Studios Gallery, Tel Aviv, Israel

1997

- Design, Hamidrasha Academy of Art Gallery, Beit Berl, Israel

1995

- Avivit, the Israel Museum of Art, Jerusalem

== Selected group exhibitions ==
2013

- “La figurazione inevitabile” per l'arte contemporanea Luigi Pecci, Prato, Italy
- “Mythographies”, Yafo 23, Jerusalem

2012

- “Accelerating Toward Apocalypse: Works from the Doron Sebbag Art Collection”, Givon Art Forum, Tel Aviv, Israel

2011

- “The Museum Presents Itself: Israeli Art from the Museum Collection”, Tel Aviv Museum of Art, Tel Aviv, Israel
- “The Second Strike”, Hezliya Museum of Contemporary Art, Hezliya, Israel

2010

- Re-Dressing, Bortolami, NY
- What Is Political, Bat - Yam Museum of art, Israel

2009

- Directions, A Palazzo Gallery, Brescia, Italy
- History of Violence, Haifa Museum of Art, Israel

2008

- Penal Colony, Ein Harod Museum, Israel
- SGOZZATA, Peres Projects, Berlin
- Eventually We'll Die, Young art in Israel of the Nineties, Herzliya Museum of Contemporary Art, Israel

2007

- XXS (Extra Extra Small), Sommer Contemporary Art, Tel Aviv, Israel

2006

- Infinite Painting: Contemporary Painting and Global Realism, Villa Manin Centre for Contemporary Art, Passariano, Codroipo (Udine), Italy
- Dark, Museum Boijmans Van Beuningen Rotterdam, Holland
- Through the looking glass, Galerie Bob van Orsouw, Zurich

2005

- A Wonderful View, Vous Etes Ici, Amsterdam
- The New Hebrews, Martin Gropius-Bau, Berlin

2004

- Huts, Douglas Hyde Gallery, Dublin
- Painting 2004, Victoria Miro Gallery, London

2003

- Clandestine, the 50th International Art Exhibition of La Biennale di Venezia, Venice, Italy

2001

- The Armory Show, Tel Aviv Museum of Art, Tel Aviv
- Israel Spunky, Exit Art, New York

2000

- Le Repubbliche Dell’Arte; the Israeli Season, Palazzo Delle Papesse, Sienna, Italy
- Wish List: New Acquisitions, Israel Museum of Art, Jerusalem

1999

- Ladies and Gentlemen, Tel Aviv Museum of Art, Tel Aviv, Israel

1998

- Video Program # 3: Herzliya Museum of Contemporary Art, Herzliya, Israel
- The Lesser Light, Israel Museum of Art, Jerusalem
- Spring at the end of the summer, Tel Aviv Museum of Art, Tel Aviv, Israel
- Ministry of Education and Culture Award Exhibition, Herzilya Museum of Contemporary Art, Herzliya, Israel

1994

- En Suite, Museum van Hedenaagse Kunst, Ghent, Belgium
- Transit, ArtFocus 1, New Central Bus Station, Tel Aviv, Israel
