= Jordan Wolfson =

Contemporary American artist

- Born: 1980 (age 45–46); New York, US
- Education: Rhode Island School of Design
- Awards: Cartier Award; 2009
- Website: jordanwolfson.org

Jordan Wolfson (born 1980) is an American visual artist who lives in Los Angeles. His practice tends to explore cutting-edge technology: spanning video, AI generated images, robotics, sculpture, installation, and virtual reality.

== Early life and education ==
Jordan Wolfson was born in 1980 in New York to Ashkenazi Jewish parents. Wolfson grew up in a secular Jewish household. He has 3 older sisters, Jody, Tracy and Jessica Wolfson. He often incorporates themes of Jewish identity and cultural symbols such as the star of David into his works.

He received a BFA in sculpture from the Rhode Island School of Design in Providence in 2003. At that time, Wolfson began producing film and video work and computer animation that was shown in the United States and in Europe. His first exhibition took place at Galleri Brändström & Stene in Stockholm, when he was 22.

== Career ==
Since 2014 his work has included aluminum and brass sculptures mixed with digital imagery, works using virtual reality, and Animatronic sculptures.

=== Selected works ===
==== Body Sculpture ====
Wolfson's Body Sculpture (2023) is an animatronic work that combines sculpture and performance. The work premiered at the National Gallery of Australia. Wolfson views the work as an expression of “the dark and light sides of the human experience,” from violence and aggression to curiosity and playfulness.

In 2020, the National Gallery of Australia, under the directorship of Nick Mitzevich, purchased it for A$6.67 (£3.5m), about half the museum's annual acquisition budget. The final transport and installation of the work was then delayed due to the COVID-19 pandemic. It was finally unveiled in 2023. Renamed Body Sculpture, the robotic artwork is the first solo presentation of Wolfson's work in Australia, which was on display alongside key works from the national collection selected by the artist from December 9, 2023, until July 28, 2024.

==== Female Figure ====
Wolfson's Female Figure (2014) is an animatronic sculpture of a woman dressed in a négligée, thigh-high vinyl boots, and a green half-witch mask covered in dirt marks and scuffs. The figure dances while speaking in Wolfson's voice. Using facial recognition technology, she locks eyes with viewers through a mirror. In 2019 ARTnews and Artnet News listed Female Figure as one of the artworks that defined the decade.

==== Colored Sculpture ====
Wolfson's Colored Sculpture (2016) was first shown at David Zwirner gallery in New York City and later exhibited at the Tate Modern in London, LUMA Foundation in Arles, and at the Stedelijk Museum, Amsterdam. The work consists of an animatronic sculptural figure of a boy attached to the ceiling with long chains connected to his head, arm, and leg. The boy's cartoon-like appearance is based on familiar images of Huck Finn, the 1940s television character Howdy Doody, and the MAD magazine character Alfred E. Neuman. The sculpture's movements - the boy is by turn hoisted up, dropped to the floor, and swung through the air - are timed and regulated by motors built into the ceiling. His eyes are equipped with facial recognition technology that allows the sculpture to make eye contact with viewers present in the room.

==== Real Violence ====
Wolfson's immersive virtual reality piece Real Violence was included in the 2017 Whitney Biennial and quickly was a point of controversy, receiving media attention due to its graphic imagery. Real Violence was intended to provoke a conversation about the nature of virtual reality as an authentic experience over which the viewer has authority. The work received criticism at the New Museum screening in 2017. The debate concerned the role of the artist, Wolfson's responsibility in making a political statement with his art, and if there is a role of privilege/power hierarchy that should have been addressed when dealing with the subject matter of violence.

== Recognition ==
In 2009 Wolfson was awarded the Cartier Award from the Frieze Foundation.

== Exhibitions ==
Following Wolfson's first solo museum exhibition, at the Kunsthalle Zürich in 2004, his work was widely shown at galleries and museums in Europe, Asia, and the United States. His work was first exhibited in Germany in 2011 at the Kunstsammlung Nordrhein-Westfalen. His first solo exhibition in the United Kingdom, Raspberry Poser, was presented in 2013 at the Chisenhale Gallery in London.

Jordan Wolfson: Ecce Homo/le Poseur, organized by the Stedelijk Museum voor Actuele Kunst (S.M.A.K.) in Ghent in 2013, was the most comprehensive survey of his work to date.

In 2014 a selection of Wolfson's video work was exhibited as part of the 6th Glasgow International, and he participated in 14 Rooms at Art Basel curated by Klaus Biesenbach and Hans Ulrich Obrist. Wolfson was among the youngest artists in the Basel exhibition, a collaboration between Fondation Beyeler, Art Basel, and Theater Basel that also featured the work of Yoko Ono, Damien Hirst, Bruce Nauman, and Marina Abramović, among others.

Other notable exhibitions include:

- 2006 – Untitled (Frank Painting Company, Inc.), Whitney Biennial, New York
- 2007 – Optical Sound, solo exhibition curated by Alessandro Rabottini, Galleria d'Arte Moderna e Contemporanea di Bergamo (GAMeC), Bergamo, Italy
- 2008 – untitled false document, Swiss Institute Contemporary Art New York, New York City
- 2009 – The Exhibition Formerly Known as Passengers, CCA Wattis Institute for Contemporary Arts, San Francisco
- 2012 – Animation, masks, Alex Zachary Peter Currie gallery, New York City
- 2012 – Animation, masks, Kunsthalle Wien, Vienna
- 2012–13 – Raspberry Poser, REDCAT, Los Angeles
- 2013–14 – Raspberry Poser, solo exhibition, Chisenhale Gallery, London
- 2014 – Female Figure, 14 Rooms, Art Basel, Serpentine Gallery, London
- 2016 – Colored sculpture, David Zwirner Gallery, New York
- 2017 – Real Violence (VR work), Whitney Biennial, New York
- 2017 – Riverboat Song, Sadie Coles HQ, London
- 2018 – Riverboat Song, David Zwirner Gallery, New York
- 2022 – Transformers. Masterpieces of the Frieder Burda Collection in Dialogue with Artificial Beings, Museum Frieder Burda, Baden-Baden

== Collections ==
Wolfson's work is represented in public collections worldwide, including Fondazione Sandretto Re Rebaudengo, Turin; Galleria d’Arte Moderna e Contemporanea di Bergamo, Italy; Magasin III Museum and Foundation for Contemporary Art, Stockholm; Museum of Contemporary Art, Chicago; Museum Ludwig, Cologne; Stedelijk Museum voor Actuele Kunst (S.M.A.K.), Ghent; the Whitney Museum of American Art, New York, and the National Gallery of Australia.
