= Victoria Morton =

Scottish artist

- Born: 1971 (age 54–55); Glasgow, Scotland
- Education: Glasgow School of Art
- Known for: painting, sculpture, installations

Victoria Morton (born 1971) is a Scottish contemporary visual artist who works in paint, sculpture and installation.

== Biography ==
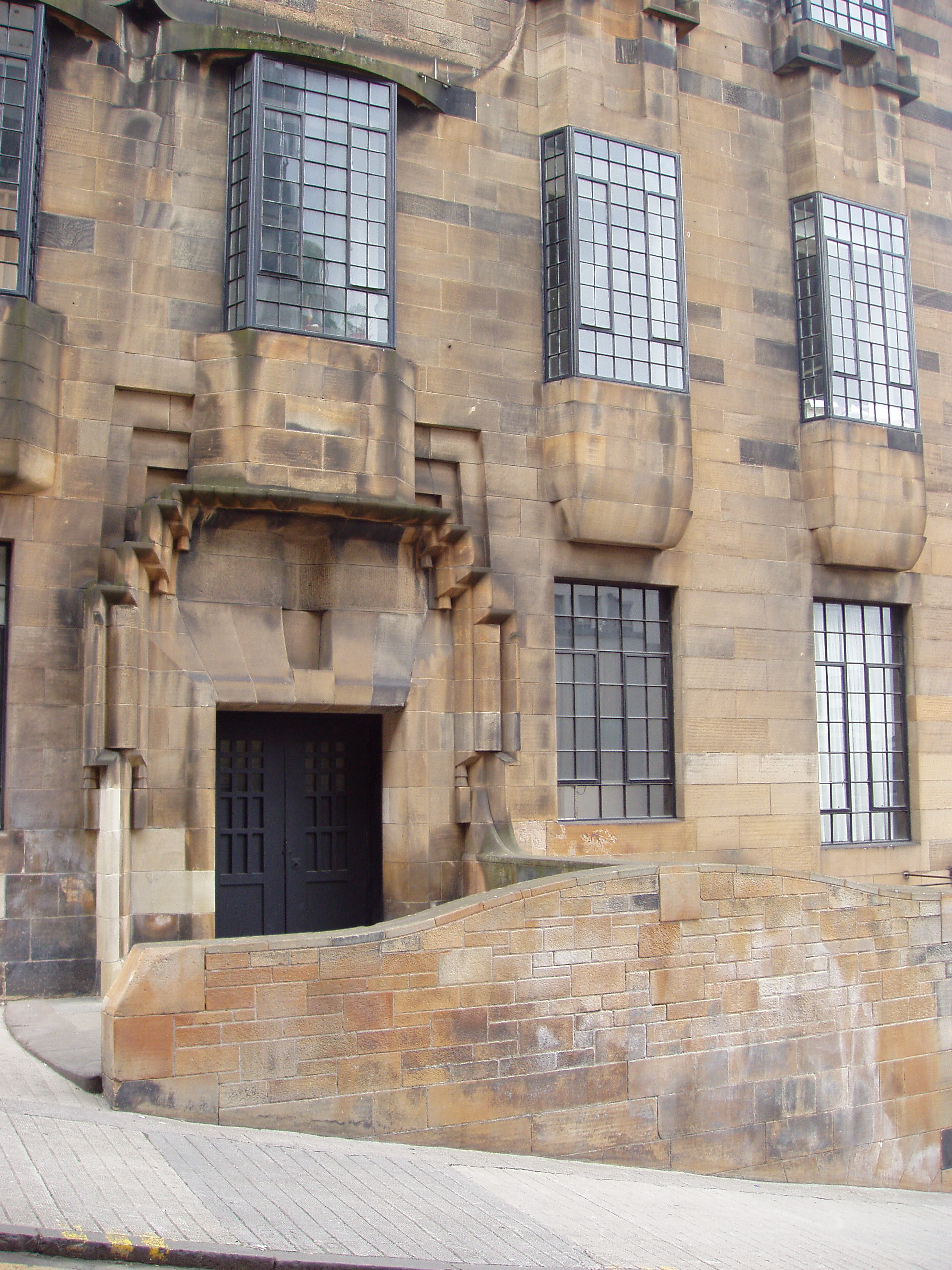
Glasgow School of Art

Morton was born in Glasgow and trained at the Glasgow School of Art from 1989 to 1993, completing her master's degree there in 1995.

Morton was selected for the New Art in Scotland exhibition at the Glasgow Centre for Contemporary Arts (1994) and Aberdeen Art Gallery (1995). Her work was included in Loaded: A Contemporary View of British Painting at the Ikon Gallery, Birmingham (1996).

In 2014 she exhibited at The Modern Institute, Glasgow, and with Mouth Wave at the Rat Hole Gallery, Tokyo. In 2016 Morton's work was shown at Glasgow Gallery of Modern Art's exhibition Devils in the Making, an exhibition recognising GSA's contribution to the city's artistic life. Also in 2016, Morton exhibited with Spoken Yeahs from a Distance at Sadie Coles HQ, London.

Morton has also exhibited at the following venues (among others):

- Fruitmarket Gallery
- Inverleith House
- Isabella Stewart Gardner Museum

She was a member of the Glasgow performance collective, Elizabeth Go.

In 2016 the McManus Galleries in Dundee acquired three of Morton's abstract works.

== Art practice ==
Morton primarily works in paint. Her practice demonstrates a continued interest in the interplay between colour and memory.

Morton's earlier work explored methods of application, including spraying onto the canvas and the use of different objects to apply the paint. While her earlier paintings demonstrate an interest in organic forms, her later paintings have exhibited a more geometric style. Morton's work has been described as seeming to ‘hover between abstraction and representation’.

Morton has stated that she is inspired by a broad range of source material including fashion design and fine art.

== Solo exhibitions ==
- 2002: Night Geometry, Gavin Brown's Enterprise, New York
- 2002: Pleasure and Practice, Transmission Gallery, Glasgow
- 2001: Sadie Coles HQ, London and Galerie Enja Wonneberger, Kiel
- 1999: The Modern Institute, Glasgow
- 1999: Decapoca, The Changing Room, Stirling
- 1997: Dirty Burning, 33 Great Sutton St., London and Gallery Tre, Stockholm
- 1996: Out of the Web, Fringe Gallery, Castlemilk, Glasgow, Transmission Gallery, Glasgow and Pier Arts Centre, Orkney
- 1995: Wilkes Dalriada, Glasgow
