= Klaus Peter Brehmer =

German painter

KP Brehmer
- Born: Klaus Peter Brehmer; 12 September 1938; Berlin, Nazi Germany
- Died: 16 December 1997 (aged 59); Hamburg, Germany
- Occupations: Painter, graphic artist, filmmaker

Klaus Peter Brehmer (12 September 1938 – 16 December 1997), better known as KP Brehmer, was a German painter, graphic artist and filmmaker. From 1971 to 1997 he was professor at the Hochschule für bildende Künste Hamburg.

Most of his works can be considered as political art or the visualization of political trends.

== Biography ==
Brehmer was born 1938 in Berlin. After school he graduated from 1957 to 1959 as a process engraver and as early as 1959 he first made etchings. The training was followed from 1959 to 1961 by the study of graphics at the Werkkunstschule Krefeld.

Beginning in 1961, he started using photographic films, radiograms, and block prints, and further studied graphics at the Kunstakademie Düsseldorf, where he worked until 1963 with Coester.

After a year's residence in Paris at the studio of Stanley William Hayter, he returned to Berlin, and dedicated himself to various types of graphic design. In this time his folded graphics, stamps series, colors and scales, different demographics and film works were produced.

In 1971 he became professor at the Hochschule für bildende Künste Hamburg and in 1987 and 1988, he was a guest lecturer at the China Academy of Art in Hangzhou.

== Works ==
In the earliest works using photomechanical reproduction techniques (block prints, screen printing and offset printing), soon "real" objects such as architectural, technical and organic elements were added to the abstract motifs.

Influenced by the emerging new definitions of art and direction as the pop art around 1960, but also by the political rebellion of the younger generation of the 60s, Brehmer defined a new form of language, which, in opposition to abstract art of the 50s, served realistic motifs. Thus arose around 1963 so-called trivial graphics, as the cliché pressure (a high-technology, also known as "Rasterätzung" or "Autotypie") were exported. Brehmer used "everyday" motifs from advertising and the mass media, like naked women, cars or spacemen. he finally overcome with the construction of boxes and the limited dimensionality of printmaking. In the mid-60s he took advantage of a new motif: the stamp, which can be defined as authoritative body with cultural definition of power. Sometimes he combined these individual graphics to album pages or stamp-bags.

With his work since the mid-60s Brehmer was, along with Konrad Lueg, Sigmar Polke, Gerhard Richter and Wolf Vostell, an important representative of the capitalist realism style. Today, the capitalist realism works are often attributed to the European Pop Art, with a particular political remark. At the same time Brehmer tried to democratize the art and to infiltrate the structures of the commercial exploitation of art with incorrectly declared unlimited editions, proofs or special editions. In the 1970s, a new group of works – the so-called "diagrammatic work" in which colors, maps and statistics have been processed had been created. The political character came out even stronger. Brehmer dealt with the interpretation and significance of color as a symbol (Farbengeografien, Ideale Landschaft, Farbmuster) and created oversized charts and maps to Fascism (Hitler's Rede, 1973), the communist threat (Lokalisierung von Rotwerten, 1972), environmental damage ( Skyline, 1972) and war (Lokalisierung Rot/Rosa, 1972 My Lai).

The best-known work of this group is a rigged German Flag (Korrektur der Nationalfarben, 1972), wherein the three colours black – red – gold valued in different sizes are defined by the distribution of wealth in West Germany. This flag was hoisted in front of the documenta 5. From the late 1970s Brehmer – in addition to the continued production of graphics and drawings – began to paint. The motives are collected from scientific journals thermography, sonogram, etc..

Besides the graphics, panel paintings and drawings Brehmer produced films (such as "walking" 16 mm, 20 min., B / w, sound, Kleistfilm, 16 mm, 9 min., Color, sound, several documentaries on performances by J. Beuys, Moorman C., A. Kaprow, A. Koepcke, P. Polke and others) and compositions based on graphical templates (Seele und Gefühl eines Arbeiters, 1978; Composition No. 3 (In Form eines Spitzkleeblattes), 1983, etc.)

The visualization of social developments and political trends can be seen as the "common" thread in his art.

== Solo exhibitions ==
- 1964 Graphisches Kabinett der Freien Galerie, Berlin
- 1965 Klaus Peter Brehmer: Trivialgrafik, Galerie René Block, Berlin (K)
- 1971 KP Brehmer. Produktion 1962–1971, Kunstverein Hamburg (K) / Galerie Baecker, Bochum
- 1972 Galerie Bama, Paris (Frankreich) / Galerie René Block, Berlin
- 1975 Bilder einer Ausstellung, René Block Gallery, New York (US)
- 1976 KP Brehmer. Gesamte Druckgrafik, Museum Wiesbaden (K)
- 1977 Time, College of Art, Philadelphia (US)
- 1985 KP Brehmer. Wie mich die Schlange sieht. Wie ich die Schlange sehe, DAAD-Galerie, Berlin (K), Stadtgalerie, Saarbrücken; Büro Orange, Munich (K)
- 1989 KP Brehmer. 30 Jahre Arbeit in Kunst. Trivialgrafik, Aufsteller, Schachteln, 1959–1970, Galerie Vorsetzen, Hamburg (mit Stephan von Huene)
- 1993 KP Brehmer, Schamanismus, Galerie Vorsetzen, Hamburg (mit Bogomir Ecker)
- 1994 KP Brehmer – Briefmarken 1966–1972, Galerie Bernd Slutzky, Frankfurt (K)
- 1995 KP Brehmer, DG HYP-Ausstellungsforum, Hamburg (K)
- 1998 KP Brehmer – Alle Künstler lügen, Fridericianum, Kassel (K)
- 2000 KP Brehmer – Das Gefühl zwischen den Fingerkuppen, Galerie Bernd Slutzky, Frankfurt
- 2004 KP Brehmer – Nationale Werte, Städtische Galerie Bietigheim-Bissingen
- Ständige Ausstellung seit 1998 im Sockelgeschoß der Hamburger Kunsthalle
- 2009 KP Brehmer – Milliken Gallery, Stockholm (Schweden)
- 2011 KP Brehmer – A TEST EXTENDING BEYOND THE ACTION Centro Andaluz de Arte Contemporáneo Sevilla (Spanien)
- 2013 KP Brehmer und die Grafik des Kapitalistischen Realismus. Neue Nationalgalerie, Berlin.
- 2014 KP Brehmer Real Capital – Production Raven Row, London.
- 2015 KP Brehmer Scheinbar abstrakte Kunst Vorsetzen, Hamburg
- 2019 KP Brehmer – Kunst≠PropagandaGemeentemuseum Den Haag, The Hague
- Neues Museum Nürnberg (2018/19); Hamburger Kunsthalle (2019); und ARTER, Istanbul Turkey(2020)
- 2023 KP Brehmer – Welt im Kopf [World in Mind] curated by Elisa R. Linn and Lennart Wolff, Petzel Gallery and Maxwell Graham Gallery, New York (US)

== Group exhibitions ==
„KP Brehmer hatte es gar nicht so sehr auf Einzelausstellungen angelegt. Ihm erschienen Gruppenausstellungen wegen des künstlerischen Austausches interessanter“. (Zitat Monika Brehmer)

- 1964 Neodada, Pop Decollage, Kapitalistischer Realismus, Galerie René Block, Berlin
- 1966 Kritische Grafik. Brehmer – Staeck – Vostell, Graficky kabinety, Brno (Tschechoslowakei)
- 1967 Hommage à Lidice, Galerie René Block, Berlin; Spala Galerie, Prag (Tschechoslowakei) / New multiple art, Whitechapel Art Gallery, London (Großbritannien)
- 1971 Metamorphose des Dinges. Kunst und Antikunst 1910–1970, Nationalgalerie, Staatliche Museen Preußischer Kulturbesitz, Berlin
- 1972 documenta 5. Befragung der Realität. Bildwelten heute, Kassel
- 1973 Kunst im politischen Kampf. Aufforderung – Anspruch – Wirklichkeit, Kunstverein Hannover
- 1974 Art in Society. Society into Art, Institute of Contemporary Arts, London (Großbritannien)
- 1975 Druckgrafik der Gegenwart, Nationalgalerie, Berlin / Boites, ARC 2, Musée d´Art Moderne de la ville de Paris (Frankreich)
- 1976 Künstler drucken, Leipzig (DDR) / Working Party, Whitechapel Art Gallery, London (Großbritannien)
- 1977 documenta 6 in Kassel / 13° E. Eleven Artists working in Berlin, Whitechapel Art Gallery, London (Großbritannien)
- 1978 Eremit? Forscher? Sozialarbeiter? Das veränderte Selbstverständnis von Künstlern, Kunstverein und Kunsthaus, Hamburg / Kunst von 1960 bis heute, Berlinische Galerie, Berlin / Realisten, Kunsthalle Rostock (DDR); Moskau (Russland)
- 1979 Für Augen und Ohren. Von der Spieluhr zum akustischen Environment, Akademie der Künste, Berlin / Écouter par les yeux, ARC, Musée d´Art Moderne de la ville de Paris (Frankreich) / Cartes de la terre, Centre Pompidou, Paris (Frankreich)
- 1984 Zugehend auf eine Biennale des Friedens. Hamburger Wochen für Bildende Kunst 1985, Kunsthaus und Kunstverein, Hamburg
- 1985 Vorsatz 1, Galerie Vorsetzen, Hamburg
- 1987 1961 Berlin art 1987, Museum of Modern Art, New York (US)
- 1988 China & The West Calligraphy & Painting Harmony, Art Gallery, Hangzhou (VR China)
- 1989 Broken Music. Artists' Recordworks, DAAD-Galerie, Berlin; Gemeentemuseum, Den Haag (Niederlande); Magasin, Grenoble (Schweiz)
- 1990 The Readymade Boomerang / 8th Biennale of Sydney (Australien)
- 1991 Fluxus & Concept-art. Sammlung Beck, Wilhelm-Hack-Museum, Ludwigshafen / Umwandlungen, National Gallery of Korea, Seoul (Südkorea) / Mit dem Kopf durch die Wand. Sammlung Block, Statens Museum for Kunst, Kopenhagen; Kunsthalle, Nürnberg
- 1992 KP Brehmer, K.H. Hödicke, Konrad Lueg, Wolf Vostell, Sigmar Polke, Gerhard Richter, Grafik des Kapitalistischen Realismus, Galerie Bernd Slutzky, Frankfurt (K)
- 1993 Mediale Hamburg
- 1997 PRO LIDICE – 52 Künstler aus Deutschland, Tschechisches Museum für Bildende Künste, Prag (Tschechien)
- 1999 Pop Impressions. Europe/US, The Museum of Modern Art, New York (US) / EuroPop. A Dialogue with the US, Arken Museum for Moderne Kunst, Kopenhagen (Dänemark)/ Chronos und Kairos. Die Zeit in der zeitgenössische Kunst, Fridericianum Kassel
- 2000 Das XX. Jahrhundert. Ein Jahrhundert Kunst in Deutschland. Nationalgalerie Berlin / Hamburger Bahnhof (K)
- 2002 Shopping. 100 Jahre Kunst und Konsum. Kunsthalle Schirn, Frankfurt, Tate Gallery Liverpool (Großbritannien)
- 2003 Berlin-Moskau. 1950–2000, Berliner Festspiele / Martin-Gropiusbau Berlin
- 2004 Moskau-Berlin 1950–2000. Staatliches Historisches Museum, Moskau (Russland) / Behind the Facts. Interfunktionen 1968-75. Miró Foundation, Barcelona (Spanien); Porto (Portugal) / Two and One.Printmaking in Germany 1945–1990, Kunsthalle zu Kiel / Krieg Medien Kunst. Städtische Galerie Bietigheim-Bissingen
- 2006 Art Salon Belgrade – ART, LIFE & CONFUSION, Belgrad (Serbien) / Eye on europe. Prints, books & multiples 1960 to know, The Museum of Modern Art, New York (US) / Far West. Vier Künstler zwischen Deutschland und China, Kunsthaus Hamburg, verschiedene Stationen in China (2007) Shanghai u.a.
- 2007 FAR WEST, Mingyan Artcenter, Shanghai (VR China)
- 2008 Europop, Kunsthaus Zürich (Schweiz)
- 2008 True Romance. Allegorien von der Renaissance bis heute, Kunsthalle Wien,(Österreich) Villa Stuck, Munich, Kunsthalle zu Kiel / Europop Ausstellung im Kunsthaus Zürich / German Angst, Der Neue Berliner Kunstverein / Art Basel, Galerie Milliken
- 2009 Flagge zeigen? Die Deutschen und ihre Nationalsymbole, Haus der Geschichte der Bundesrepublik Deutschland / Quartett – Vier Biennalen im Spiegel grafischer Blätter, Tanas, Berlin / Werke aus der Sammlung Block, Neues Museum in Nürnberg / Bilder einer Ausstellung, Edition Block Berlin / Bilderschlachten – 2000 Jahre Nachrichten aus dem Krieg, Museum Industriekultur / The Armory Show 2009, New York, Milliken Gallery / 1968. Die große Unschuld, Kunsthalle Bielefeld / Time as Matter. MACBA Collection. New acquisitions, Museu d'Art Contemporani de Barcelona / Red Thread – Ein Prolog zur 11. Internationalen Istanbul Biennale Tanas Berlin / 11. Biennale Istanbul / Kunst und Kalter Krieg – Deutsche Positionen 1945–1989, Deutsches Historisches Museum Berlin
- 2010 Vom Ursprung der Welten, Künstlerhaus Hamburg e.V. FRISE / Kapitalistischer Realismus. Grafik aus der Sammlung Block, Die Feininger Galerie Quedlinburg
- 2011 modell/stadt/muster/stadt, Centre d'art passerelle Brest (Frankreich)/ travaille(r) la réalité ! Centre d'art passerelle Brest (Frankreich) / GRAFIK DES KAPITALISTISCHEN REALISMUS, Edition Block Berlin / All I Can See is the Management, Gasworks (London/Grossbritannien)/ 6th MOMENTUM Bienal, Norwegen / Museum of Affects. In the framework of L'InternationaleMuseum of Contemporary Art Metelkova, Slowenien / Belvedere – Warum ist Landschaft schön? Arp Museum Bahnhof Rolandseck in Remagen
- 2012 Doppelte Ökonomien – Vom Lesen eines Fotoarchivs aus der DDR (1967–1990), Halle14 – Zentrum für zeitgenössische Kunst, Leipziger Baumwollspinnerei / Hungry City. Landwirtschaft in der zeitgenössischen Kunst, Kunstraum Kreuzberg / Bethanien, Berlin / Erhöhte Temperatur. Kunst und Klima, Salzburger Kunstverein (Österreich) / Abstraktion und Alltag, Galerie Nord – Kunstverein Tiergarten, Berlin / Capitalist Realism, Early prints of KP Brehmer, Karl Horst Hödicke, Konrad Lueg, Sigmar Polke, Gerhard Richter, Wolf Vostell, Kunsthal 44 Møen / Pi – π Verwandlungen des Kreises, Landdrotei Pinneberg
- 2013 55th International Art Exhibition at the Venice Biennale, Venedig (Italien)Biennale di Venezia
- 2014 Playtime, Städtische Galerie im Lenbachhaus, Munich / GERMAN POP Schirn Kunsthalle, Frankfurt (Main)
- 2015 Office Space Yerba Buena Center for the Arts, San Francisco (US)/ Adventures of the Black Square Whitechapel, London(GB)

== Bibliography (selection) ==
- Réné Block: Grafik des Kapitalistischen Realismus. 2 volumes. Berlin 1971/1974.
- KP Brehmer: Wie mich die Schlange sieht... Exhibition Catalog, Daad-Galerie, Berlin 1985.
- Hubertus Butin: KP Brehmer, Briefmarken 1966–1972. Exhibition Catalog. Galerie Bernd Slutzky, 1994, ISBN 3-9802923-1-2.
- KP Brehmer: Alle Künstler lügen. Exhibition Catalog. Fridericianum, Kassel 1998.
- Björn Egging: Von Pop zu Politik. Studien zur Entwicklung der politisch engagierten Kunst KP Brehmers 2004. Staats- und Universitätsbibliothek der freien und Hansestadt Hamburg. Digitalisat
- Kapitalistischer Realismus. Grafik aus der Sammlung Block. Exhibition Catalog. Kerber Verlag, ISBN 978-3-86678-413-0.
- S. D. Sauerbier: Welt aus Zeichen – Kodierung des Trivialen. [Über das Werk von KP Brehmer.] = Künstler. Kritisches Lexikon der Gegenwartskunst. Edition 46, Heft 9, Munich 1999, ISSN 0934-1730.
- KP Brehmer: Real Capital-Production. Exhibition Catalog. edited by Doreen Mende und Raven Row. KoenigBooks, 2016, ISBN 978-3-96098-065-0 (englisch)
- KP Brehmer: Kunst≠Propaganda. Exhibition Catalog. KoenigBooks 2018, ISBN 978-3-96098-459-7 (deutsch), ISBN 978-3-96098-460-3 (englisch), türkisch
- Sichtagitation Briefmarke – KP Brehmer – Aby Warburg. Michael Glasmeier, Texte Verlag / Campo Bd. 1 (deutsch) ISBN 978-3-86485-234-3.
- KP Brehmer: Song of Growth. edited by Elisa R. Linn, Lennart Wolff. Designed by Anne Stock. Haciendabooks, 2020, ISBN 978-3-907211-03-8. (englisch)

== Sources ==
- Réné Block: Grafik des Kapitalistischen Realismus. Berlin 1971/1974, 2 vol.
- KP Brehmer: Wie mich die Schlange sieht... Exhibition catalogue, Daad-Galerie, Berlin 1985
- Hubertus Butin: KP Brehmer, Briefmarken 1966-1972 Exhibition catalogue, Galerie Bernd Slutzky 1994. ISBN 3-9802923-1-2
- KP Brehmer: Alle Künstler lügen. Exhibition catalogue, Fridericianum Kassel 1998
- Björn Egging: Von Pop zu Politik. Studien zur Entwicklung der politisch engagierten Kunst KP Brehmers 2004. Staats- und Universitätsbibliothek der freien und Hansestadt Hamburg
- KP Brehmer: Real Capital-Production. Ausstellungskatalog. Ed. von Doreen Mende und Raven Row. KoenigBooks 2016, ISBN 978-3-96098-065-0 (Englisch)
- KP Brehmer: Kunst≠Propaganda. Ausstellungskatalog. KoenigBooks 2018, ISBN 978-3-96098-459-7 (Deutsch), ISBN 978-3-96098-460-3 (Englisch)
- KP Brehmer: Song of Growth. Ausstellungskatalog. Ed. von Elisa R. Linn und Lennart Wolff. Hacienda Books 2020, ISBN 978-3-907211-03-8 (Englisch)
