= John Currin =

American painter (born 1962)

- Born: 1962 (age 63–64); Boulder, Colorado, US
- Education: Carnegie Mellon University (BFA); Yale University (MFA)
- Known for: Painting

John Currin (born 1962) is an American painter based in New York City. He is most recognized for his satirical figurative paintings that explore sexual and societal topics. His work shows a wide range of influences, including the Renaissance, popular culture magazines, and contemporary fashion models. He often distorts or exaggerates the erotic forms of the female body, and has stressed that his characters are reflections of himself rather than inspired by real people.

== Early life ==
Currin was born in Boulder, Colorado, and grew up in Connecticut, the son of a physics professor and a piano teacher from Oklahoma. In Connecticut as a teenager he studied painting privately with Ukrainian artist Lev Meshberg. He went to Carnegie Mellon University in Pittsburgh, where he obtained a BFA in 1984, and received a MFA from Yale University in 1986.

== Career ==
At White Columns in New York City in 1989 he exhibited a series of portraits of young girls derived from the photographs in a high school yearbook. He used magazines like Cosmopolitan along with old issues of Playboy for inspiration for his paintings. In 1992 Currin moved to the Andrea Rosen Gallery, focusing on middle-aged women. By the late 1990s Currin's ability to paint subjects of kitsch with technical facility met with critical and financial success, and by 2003 his paintings were selling "for prices in the high six figures" after he moved to the Gagosian Gallery in Chelsea, New York. More recently, he has undertaken a series of figure paintings dealing with pornographic themes, saying: "One motive of mine is to see if I could make this clearly debased and unbeautiful thing become beautiful in a painting".

''The Veil'', oil on canvas by John Currin

He has had retrospective exhibitions at the Whitney Museum of American Art and the Museum of Contemporary Art Chicago and is represented in the permanent collections of the Hirshhorn Museum and Sculpture Garden and the Tate.

In 1994 Currin met artist Rachel Feinstein at a gallery in which she was living in a self-made gingerbread house as a performance piece. They were engaged two weeks later at Currin's show in Paris, and married three years later on Valentine's Day. They have two sons and a daughter. She has been described as his muse, which he says is "kinda corny". However, he also stated: "[W]hen I met Rachel I felt that I could connect with some principles that moved my art along, that I had some freedom from the petty things in my own personality." Feinstein has appeared in many of Currin's paintings, both as a face and as a body model. In 2002 Feinstein and Currin published a 24-page book of their works at the Hydra Workshop in Hydra, Greece, which they titled The Honeymooners: John Currin and Rachel Feinstein. It includes an interview conducted by Sadie Coles HQ. In 2011 The New York Times described them as "the ruling power couple in today’s art world".

In a 2011 interview, Currin described his relationship to his work as "a completely ambisexual atmosphere. I think you're right if there's a reverse logic to my work [i]t's that the pictures of men are about men and the pictures of women are about me." He has been influenced by 16th-century Northern European paintings, Old Master portraits, pin-ups, nymphs, and ethereal feminine prototypes. His paintings hold both the grotesque and the beautiful, and range in inspiration from classical artists such as Jean-Honoré Fragonard to more contemporary artists like Norman Rockwell and Robert Crumb. Art historians and curators have also connected Currin's provocative style and use of kitsch to the post-war Bad Painting movement, citing French artist Bernard Buffet alongside figures like Francis Picabia and Martin Kippenberger.

== Art market ==
The artist's most expensive works sold at auction:

1. $12,007,500 – Nice 'n Easy, 1999. Christie's, November 15, 2016.
2. $4,645,000 – Miss Fenwick, 1996. Sotheby's, May 14, 2014.
3. $3,615,000 – Tolbrook, 2006. Sotheby's, May 16, 2019.
4. $3,525,000 – The Collaborator, 2010. Christie's, May 11, 2015.
5. $3,525,000 – Amanda, 2003. Phillips, November 11, 2013.

== Source materials ==
Currin has cited Danish pornography "pulled [...] off the Internet" as source material for his work. Specific images published by Color Climax Corporation have been identified as sources for Currin's more pornographic paintings, including compositions and small details.

== Exhibitions ==
=== Solo exhibits ===
- 1989: White Columns, New York City
- 1992: Andrea Rosen Gallery, New York City
- 1993: Critical Distance, curated by Luk Lambrecht, Ado Gallery, Antwerp
- 1993: Monika Sprüth Galerie, Cologne
- 1994: Galerie Jennifer Flay, San Francisco
- 1994: Andrea Rosen Gallery, New York City
- 1995: Institute of Contemporary Arts, London
- 1995: Andrea Rosen Gallery, New York City
- 1995: Fonds régional d'art contemporain, Limoges
- 1995: Donald Young Gallery, Seattle
- 1995: Jack Hanley Gallery, San Francisco
- 1996: Regen Projects, Los Angeles
- 1997: Andrea Rosen Gallery, New York City
- 1997: Sadie Coles HQ, London
- 1999: Andrea Rosen Gallery, New York City
- 1999: Regen Projects, Los Angeles
- 2000: Sprüth Magers, Cologne
- 2000: Sadie Coles HQ, London
- 2001: Andrea Rosen Gallery, New York City
- 2002: Regen Projects, Los Angeles
- 2003: Sadie Coles HQ, London
- 2003: Museum of Contemporary Art Chicago; Serpentine Galleries, London; Whitney Museum of American Art, New York City
- 2003: John Currin: Works on Paper, Des Moines Art Center; Aspen Art Museum; Milwaukee Art Museum
- 2006: Gagosian Gallery, New York City
- 2008: John Currin: New Paintings, Sadie Coles HQ, London
- 2009: John Currin: Works on Paper: A Fifteen Year Survey of Women, Andrea Rosen Gallery, New York City
- 2010: John Currin: New Paintings, Gagosian Gallery, New York City
- 2011: DHC/ART, Montreal
- 2012: Sadie Coles HQ, London
- 2013: Gagosian Gallery, Paris
- 2019: John Currin: My Life as a Man, Dallas Contemporary
- 2021: Memorial, Gagosian Gallery, New York City
- 2022: New Paintings, Sadie Cole HQ, London

=== Selected group exhibits ===
- 2023: GAMES, GAMBLERS & CARTOMANCERS, The New Cardsharps, Art & Newport, Newport RI, USA; Capturing the Moment, Tate Modern, London, England
- 2022: Pictus Porrectus: Reconsidering the Full-Length Portrait, Isaac Bell House, Newport RI, USA; REPEATER, Sadie Coles HQ, Kingly Street, London, England
- 2021: Hong Kong Exchange, Pedder Building, Hong Kong; and I will wear you in my heart of heart, Flag Art Foundation, New York NY, USA
- 2020: On Everyones Lips, From Pieter Bruegel to Cindy Sherman, Kunstmuseum Wolfsburg, Wolfsburg, Germany; Painting is Painting's Favorite Food, South Etna Montauk, Montauk, New York NY, USA, curated by Alison Gingeras; American Pastoral, Gagosian, Britannia Street, London, England
- 2019: Reason Gives No Answers: Selected Works from the Collection, Gagosian, Paris, France; An Exhibition for Notre-Dame, Gagosian, Paris, France; Flora + Fauna, Sadie Coles HQ, Davies Street, London, England
- 2018: Cliche, Almine Rech Gallery, New York NY, USA; Nude: Art from the Tate’s Collection, Yokohama Museum of Art, Yokohama, Japan; NUDE: Masterpieces from the Tate, Seoul Olympic Museum of Art, Seoul, South Korea
- 2017: Body Laid Bare: Masterpieces from the Tate, Auckland Art Gallery Toi o Tāmak, Auckland, New Zealand; Lucas Cranach the Elder: 500 Years of the Power of Temptation, The National Museum of Art, Osaka, Japan
- 2016: Lucas Cranach the Elder: 500 Years of the Power of Temptation, NMWA The National Museum of Western Art, Tokyo, Japan; Desire, Moore Building, Miami FL, USA; Nude: From Modigliani to Currin, Gagosian, Madison Avenue, New York NY, USA
- 2015: America Is Hard to See, Whitney Museum of American Art, New York NY, USA; The Shell (Landscapes, Portraits & Shapes); A show by Éric Troncy, Almine Rech Gallery, Paris, France; Dans un Intérieur. Meubles, œuvres murales & textiles d'artistes. Almine Rech Gallery, Brussels, Belgium; As Is Is, Altman Siegel, San Francisco CA, USA; La Peregrina, A Contemporary Response To Rubens and His Legacy, RA Royal Academy of Arts, London, England, curated by Jenny Saville; Sleepless – The bed in history and contemporary art, 21er Haus, Österreichische Galerie Belvedere, Vienna, Austria, curated by Mario Codognato
- 2014: She: Picturing Women at the Turn of the 21st Century, David Winton Bell Gallery and the Cohen Gallery, Brown University, Providence RI, USA; FIERCE CREATIVITY, Pace Gallery, New York NY, USA; Urs Fischer curated show, Sadie Coles HQ, South Audley Street, London, England; Somos Libres II: Works from the Mario Testino Collection, Pinacoteca Giovanni e Marella Agnelli, Turin, Italy, curated by Neville Wakefield
- 2013: NYC 1993: Experimental Jet Set, Trash and No Star, New Museum, New York, NY
- 2012: Freedom Not Genius, Works from Damien Hirst's Collection, Pinacoteca Giovanni e Marella Agnelli, Turin, Italy Curators’ Series #5. Bouvard and Pécuchet's, Compendious Quest for Beauty, David Roberts Art Foundation, London, England Absentee Landlord, Walker Art Center, Minneapolis, MN
- 2011: Celebrating the Golden Age, Grans Hals Museum, Amsterdam, the Netherlands The Deer, Le Consortium Dijon, Dijon, France
- 2010: Lebenslust und Totentanz, Kunsthalle Krems, Krems, Austria Kupferstichkabinett: Between Thought and Action, White Cube, London, England Crash: Homage to JG Ballard, Gagosian Gallery, Britannia Street, London, England In the Company of Alice, Victoria Miro Gallery, London, England Connecticut, D’Amelio Terras, New York, NY
- 2009: Mary Magdelene, The Metropolitan Opera, New York, NY Slow Paintings, Museum Morsbroich, Leverkusen, Germany Tears of Eros, Museo Thyssen-Bornemisza, Madrid, Spain Oscar Tuazon. That's Not Made For That, David Roberts Foundation, London, England Paint Made Flesh, Memorial Art Gallery of the University of Rochester, Rochester, NY Travels to: Frist Center for the Visual Arts, Nashville, TN; The Phillips Collection, Washington, D.C.
- 2008: Diana And Actaeon - The Forbidden Gaze, Stiftung Museum Kunst Palast, Düsseldorf, Germany Travels to: Compton Verney, Warwickshire, England Bad Painting. Good Art, mumok - Museum of Modern Art, Vienna, Austria Pretty Ugly, Gavin Brown's Enterprise, New York, NY THE OLYMP – Works on Paper, Burkhard Eikelmann Com, Düsseldorf, Germany
- 2007: Old School, Hauser & Wirth Colnaghi, London, England Travels to: Zwirner & Wirth, New York, NY Very Abstract and Hyper Figurative. Thomas Dane Gallery, London, England Insight?, Gagosian Gallery, Moscow, Russia What is Painting? – Contemporary Art from the Collection, Museum of Modern Art, New York, NY News on Paper, Galerie Burkhard Eikelmann, Düsseldorf, Germany Timer 01, Triennale Bovisa, Milan, Italy Painting Now! – Back to Figuration, Kunsthal Rotterdam, Rotterdam, The Netherlands Jake & Dinos Champan and John Currin, Magasin 3 Stockholm Konsthall, Stockholm, Sweden
- 2006: In the Darkest Hour There May Be Light, Works from Damien Hirst's Murderme Collection, Serpentine Gallery, London, England Surprise, Surprise, Institute of Contemporary Arts, London, England Zurück zur Figur: Marlerei der Gegenwart, Kunsthalle der Hypo-Kulturstiftung, Munich, Germany Travels to: Kunsthal Rotterdam, Rotterdam, The Netherlands; KunstHaus Wien, Vienna, Austria Painting Codes: I Codici della Pittura, Galleria Comunale d’Arte Contemporanea di Monfalcone, Monafalcone, Italy The Power of Women, Galleria Civica di Arte Contemporanea di Trento, Trento, Italy Sweets and Beauties, Fredericks and Freiser, New York, NY New York, New York, Grimaldi Forum, Monaco
- 2005: Girls on Film, curated by Kristine Bell, Zwriner and Wirth Gallery, New York, NY Drawing from the Modern, 1975–2005, Museum of Modern Art, New York, NY Idols of Perversity, Bellwether, New York, NY In Limbo. Victoria H. Myhren Gallery, University of Denver, Denver, CO Getting Emotional, Institute of Contemporary Art, Boston, MA Works on Paper, Gagosian Gallery, Beverly Hills, CA The Figurative Impulse – Works from the UBS Art Collection, Museo de Arte de Puerto Rico, Santurce, PR Fondos Regionales de Arte Contemporáneo Île-de-France y Poitou-Charentes, MAMBA – Museo de Arte Moderno de la Ciudad de Buenos Aires, Buenos Aires, Argentina Syzygy, Shaheem Modern and Contemporary Art, Cleveland, OH
- 2004: SITE Santa Fe's Fifth International Biennial: Disparities and Deformations: Our Grotesque, SITE Santa Fe Biennial, Santa Fe, NM She's Come Undone, Artemis Greenberg Van Doren Gallery, New York, NY Painting Now: Selections from the Permanent Collection, Museum of Contemporary Art San Diego, San Diego, CA Selections from the Collection of William and Ruth True, Henry Art Gallery, Seattle, WA Il Nudo: Fra Ideale e Realta, Galleria d’Arte Moderna, Bologna, Italy The Charged Image: From the Collection of Douglas S. Cramer, Joseloff Gallery, West Hartford, CT Projet Cône Sud, Museo de Arte de Lima, Peru Travels to: Centro Cultural Matucana 100, Santiago, Chile; Museo de Arte Moderno de Buenos Aires, Buenos Aires, Argentina; Museo Nacional de Artes Visuales, Montevideo, Uruguay
- 2003: 20th Anniversary Show, Monika Sprüth/Philomene Magers, Cologne, Germany John Currin Selects, Museum of Fine Arts, Boston, MA DC: Lily van der Stokker: Small Talk, Museum Ludwig, Cologne, Germany As Time Goes By, Leo Koenig, New York, NY Inaugural Exhibition, Regen Projects, Los Angeles, CA An International Legacy: Selections from Carnegie Museum of Art, Oklahoma City Museum of Art, Oklahoma City, OK Traveled to: Nevada Museum of Art, Reno, NV; Mobile Art Museum, Mobile, AL Supernova: Art of the 1990s from the Logan Collection, San Francisco Museum of Modern Art, San Francisco, CA Reverie – Works from the Collection of Douglas S. Cramer, Speed Art Museum, Louisville, KY Pittura/painting: From Rauschenberg to Murakami, 1964–2003, Museo Correr, Venice, Italy Trésors Publics: 20 Ans de Création dans les Fonds Régionaux d’Art Contemporain, Villa Grenier, Strasbourg, France
- 2002: Drawing Now: Eight Propositions, Museum of Modern Art, New York, NY Liebe Maler, male mir...Dear Painter, paint me...Cher Peintre, peins-moi, curated by Alison Gingeras, Centre Georges Pompidou, Paris, France Traveled to: Kunsthalle Wien, Vienna, Austria, Schirn Kunsthalle Frankfurt, Frankfurt-am-Main, Germany American Standard (Para) Normality and Everyday Life, Barbara Gladstone Gallery, New York, NY The Honeymooners: John Currin and Rachel Feinstein, The Hydra Workshop, Hydra, Greece Its Unfair!, Museum de Paviljoens, Almere, Spain Art for Today, Indianapolis Museum of Art, Indianapolis, IN
- 2001: Form Follows Fiction, Castello di Rivoli, Turin, Italy Azerty, Centre Georges Pompidou, Paris, France Naked Since 1950, C & M Arts, New York, NY About Faces. C & M Arts, New York, NY The Way I See It, Galerie Jennifer Flay, Paris, France Drawings, Regen Projects, Los Angeles, CA
- 2000: Kin, Kerlin Gallery, Dublin, Ireland 00, Barbara Gladstone Gallery, New York, NY Innuendo, Dee/Glasoe Gallery, New York, NY Biennial, Whitney Museum of American Art, New York, NY Couples, Cheim & Read, New York, NY
- 1999: Art Lovers, Compton House, Liverpool Biennial, Liverpool, England I'm Not Here: Constructing Identity at the Turn of the Century, The Susquehanna Art Museum, Harrisburg, PA The Great Drawing Show: 1550 to 1999, Kohn Turner Gallery, Los Angeles, CA Malerei, INIT-Kunsthalle, Berlin, Germany The Nude in Contemporary Art, Aldrich Museum of Contemporary Art, Ridgefield, CO TroubleSpot: Painting, Museum van Hedendaagse kunst Antwepren, Antwerp, Belgium Etcetera, Spacex, Exeter, England Painters: John Currin and Elizabeth Peyton, curated by Peter Schjeldahl, Carpenter Center for the Visual Arts, Harvard University, Cambridge, MA Salome: Images of Women in Contemporary Art, curated by Katherine Gass, Castle Gallery, The College of New Rochelle, NY Positioning, Center for Curatorial Studies Museum, Bard College, Annandale-on-Hudson, NY 7 Women, 7 Years Later, Andrea Rosen Gallery, New York, NY
- 1998: More Fake, More Real, Yet Ever Closer, curated by Robert Evren, Castle Gallery, The College of New Rochelle, NY The Risk of Existence, Phyllis Kind Gallery, New York, NY Young Americans 2, Part Two, Saatchi Gallery, London, England From Here to Eternity: Paintings in 1998, Max Protetch Gallery, New York, NY Hungry Ghosts, Douglas Hyde Gallery, Dublin, Ireland Portraits: People, Places and Things, Marianne Boesky Gallery, New York, NY Pop Surrealism, Aldrich Museum of Contemporary Art, Aldrich, CO Now and Later, Yale University Art Gallery, New Haven, CT
- 1997: Heart, Body, Mind, Soul: American Art in the 1990s, Selections from the Permanent Collection, Whitney Museum of American Art, New York, NY The Tate Gallery Selects: American Realities, Views from Abroad, European Perspectives on American Art 3, curated by Nicolas Serota and Sandy Naime, Whitney Museum of American Art, New York, NY Painting Project, Basilico Fine Arts and Lehmann Maupin, New York, NY Projects # 60: Currin, Peyton, Tuymans, curated by Laura Hoptman, Museum of Modern Art, New York, NY Feminine Image, Nassau County Museum of Art, Roslyn Harbor, NY
- 1996: Figure, Taka Ishii Gallery, Tokyo, Japan Pittura, Castello di Rivara, Turin, Italy Answered Prayers, Contemporary Fine Arts, Berlin, Germany Sugar Mountain, White Columns, New York, NY Face to Face, Victoria Miro Gallery, London, England Controfigura, Studio Guenzani, Milan, Italy Narcissism: Artists Reflect Themselves, California Center for the Arts Museum, Escondido, CA
- 1995: Wild Walls, Stedelijk Museum, Amsterdam, the Netherlands Travels to: Institute of Contemporary Art, London, England 25 Americans: Paintings in the 90's, Milwaukee Museum of Art, Milwaukee, WI Collection, fin XXe, Fonds Régional d’Art Contemporain Poitou-Charentes, Angoulême, France B-Movie, Phoenix Hotel, San Francisco, CA
- 1994: A series of rotating installations: Week 1: John Currin and Andrea Zittel, Andrea Rosen Gallery, New York, NY Exhibited, Center for Curatorial Studies, Bard College, Annandale-on-Hudson, NY Up the Establishment, Sonnabend Gallery, NY Kathe Burkhart, John Currin, José A. Hernandez Diez, Tony Oursler, Lorna Simpson, Sue Williams, Galleria Galliani, Genoa, Italy Don't Postpone Joy or Collecting Can Be Fun! Neue Galerie, Graz, Austria Intercourse, Mustard, Brooklyn, NY
- 1993: Medium Messages, Wooster Gardens, New York, NY Look at the Window, Museum Het Kruithuis, Hertogenbosch, The Netherlands After the Event, curated by Mike Hubert, Aperto 93 in conjunction with the Venice Biennale, Venice, Italy Project Unite Firminy, Unité d’Habitation Le Corbusier, Firminy, France Prospect ’93: An International Exhibition of Contemporary Art, Schirn Kunsthalle Frankfurt, Frankfurt-am-main, Germany SOHO at Duke IV. Duke University Museum of Art, Durham, NC
- 1992: Figurative Work from the Permanent Collection. Whitney Museum of American Art, New York, NY Double Identity, Johnen & Schottle, Cologne, Germany Dead Cat Bounce, Robbin Lockell Gallery, Chicago, IL Galerie Rudiger Schottle, Munich, Germany Travels to: Galerie Rudiger Schottle, Paris, France New Deal, Brunno Brunnet Fine Arts, Berlin, Germany
- 1991: Malerei, Johnen & Schottle, Cologne, Germany Shared Skin: Sub-Social Identifiers, Dooley Le Cappellaine Gallery, New York, NY The Good, the Bad and the Ugly: Violence and Knowledge in Recent American Art, Wesleyan University, Middletown, CT Gulliver's Travels, Sophia Ungers Galerie, Cologne, Germany 7 Women, Andrea Rosen Gallery, New York, NY John Currin and Robin Kahn, Andrea Rosen Gallery, New York, NY
- 1990: (not so) Simple Pleasures, MIT List Visual Arts Center, Boston, MA
- 1989: Amerikarma, Hallwalls, Buffalo, NY

== Sources ==
- Holzwarth, Hans W. (2009). 100 Contemporary Artists A-Z (Taschen's 25th anniversary special ed.). Köln: Taschen. pp. 114–121. ISBN 978-3-8365-1490-3.
- Tomkins, Calvin (2008). The Lives of the Artists. New York City: Henry Holt and Company. ISBN 9780805088724.
