= Nicola Tyson =

British painter (born 1960)

- Born: 1960 (age 65–66); London, Great Britain
- Known for: Visual art, painting

Nicola Tyson (born 1960 in London) is a British painter who lives in New York. Her work consists of what she describes as "psycho-figuration", and is primarily concerned with issues of identity, gender and sexuality.

== Early life ==
Tyson was born in London in 1960. She attended Chelsea School of Art, London (1979–80) and Central St. Martins, London (1980-81 & 1986–89).

== Work ==
Although Tyson works in many media including sculpture, she is best known as a figurative painter. Tyson's figures tend to be misshapen and presented with unexpected proportions. Her work has been connected stylistically to postwar British Expressionism, specifically artists such Francis Bacon and Hans Bellmer In the fall of 2018, fashion designer Victoria Beckham drew inspiration from Tyson's 2008 painting, Blue Knickers, for the color palette of her spring/summer 2019 collection, commemorating the 10th anniversary of her namesake brand.

=== Dead Letter Men ===
In 2013, Tyson published Dead Letter Men, a collection of letters written by her to dead male artists including Francis Bacon, Édouard Manet, and Pablo Picasso. For Tyson, these satirical letters bring together "autobiographical anecdotes, sexual politics and art history to create a kind soup out of which it becomes clear [her] work has evolved".

=== Bowie Nights at Billy’s Club ===
“Bowie Nights at Billy’s Club” is an archive of photographs by Nicola Tyson that documented the London club scene of the late 1970s. Taken in the autumn of 1978 while Tyson was an eighteen-year-old student at Chelsea College of Art, the images capture the earliest genesis of the New Romantic scene that was to define the decade ahead. They form a record that is at once autobiographical and social, beginning with shots from a family holiday and bearing witness to Tyson's immersion in the scene revolving around Billy's Club on Dean Street. The exhibition of photographs was originally shown at White Columns, New York in 2012 and traveled to Sadie Coles HQ, London in 2013.

== Exhibitions ==
In 1993, Tyson had her first solo exhibition at Trial Balloon, a space that she established to exclusively show female artists in New York. In 1995, she had her first solo exhibition in London at Anthony d'Offay Gallery, which was followed by a show of her drawings at Entwistle Gallery. She has shown with Petzel Gallery, New York since 1995 and Sadie Coles HQ, London since 1999. In 1998, she had a solo exhibition at the Kunsthalle Zurich. In 2017, her first full scale survey exhibition was mounted at The Contemporary Art Museum in St. Louis. This was followed by a large survey exhibition of drawings entitled “Beyond the Trace" at The Drawing Room London the same year.

She has exhibited as part of numerous group exhibitions including The Whitechapel Open at Whitechapel Gallery, London (1989), New Work: Painting Today Recent Acquisitions at San Francisco Museum of Modern Art (1999), Greater New York at MoMA PS1, New York (2000), Les Grands Spectacles – 120 Years of Art and Mass Culture at Museum der Moderne Salzburg (2005), Drawn into the World at Museum of Contemporary Art, Chicago (2006), Un-home-ly at Oakville Galleries, Toronto (2010), and Fracture and Fidelity: Painting Between Abstraction and Figuration, 1945 – 2010 at Wexner Center for the Arts, Ohio (2013).

Tyson's work was included in the 2022 exhibition Women Painting Women at the Modern Art Museum of Fort Worth.
