= 6a architects =

British architectural practice

- Industry: Architecture
- Founded: London, United Kingdom, 2001
- Key people: Stephanie Macdonald (founder) Tom Emerson (founder)
- Services: Architecture, Design, Cultural
- Website: http://www.6a.co.uk

6a architects is a British architectural practice, which was established in 2001 by Stephanie Macdonald and Tom Emerson. It is based in London, United Kingdom.

The practice won the RIBA National Award in 2011, 2017, 2018, 2019, 2021 and it was awarded the Erich Schelling Medal for Architecture in 2012.

== The practice ==
Established in 2001, 6a architects is associated with projects for cultural institutions such as art galleries, collaborations with artists and residential buildings. It was founded by life and business partners Stephanie Macdonald and Tom Emerson, who met at the Royal College of Art in 1994. Speaking on why they decided to form the practice, Macdonald has said that it was as a way to balance the responsibilities of childcare and work, after their son was born in 1999.

The practice's first project was a showroom in Mayfair for the online fashion retailer Oki-ni. This was followed by several projects involving art galleries including Raven Row gallery in East London in 2009 and the expansion of the South London Gallery in 2010. The practice was enlisted to work on the South London Gallery Fire Station, completed in 2018. Subsequently, the practice designed the new MK Gallery in Milton Keynes, which opened in 2019. The gallery was listed in second place in The Guardian's top ten architecture 2019 list and at number one in Rowan Moore's 'top 5 buildings of 2019' in The Observer. International projects have included multi-use towers in the Hafen district of Hamburg, Germany, completed in 2020.

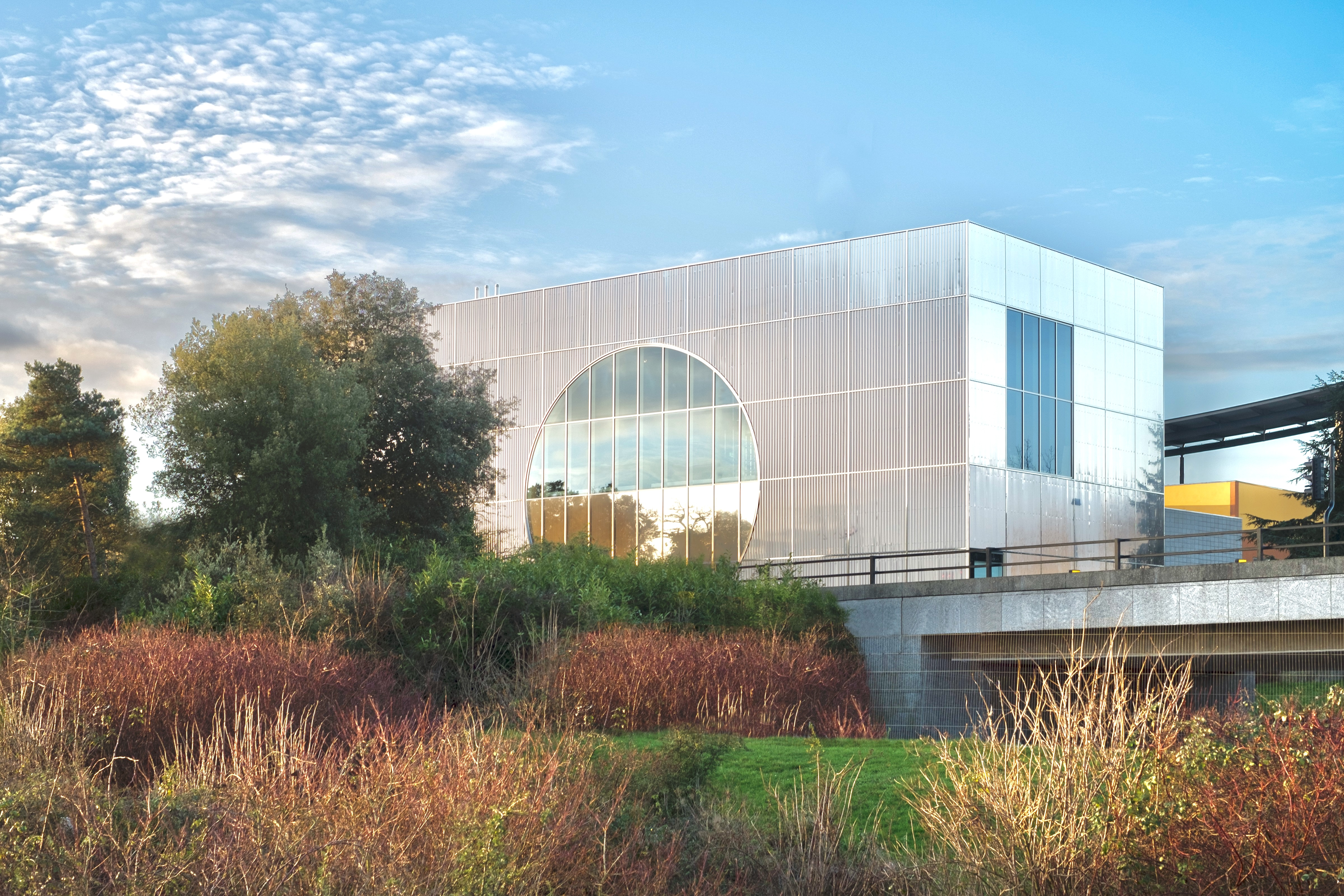
MK gallery, Milton Keynes, designed by 6a architects

== Awards and nominations ==
The practice has received several awards, nominations and been on various shortlists. For Juergen Teller's studio, the practice was awarded the RIBA London Building of the Year 2017, a RIBA National Award, a RIBA regional award and it was shortlisted for the RIBA Stirling prize. It was awarded the Woods Award for Coastal House in Devon. There have also been three nominations for the European Union Prize for Contemporary Architecture – Mies Van der Rohe Award, in 2011, 2013 and 2015. The Evening Standard listed Macdonald and Emerson on London's most influential people in 2018 in the category of architecture. The practice was cited as one of Domus's best architecture firms in 2020.

Founders Macdonald and Emerson were both appointed Officer of the Order of the British Empire (OBE) in the 2021 New Years Honours for their services to architecture.

== Notable works ==
- Oki-ni, Savile Row, London, 2001
- Raven Row, Contemporary Art Exhibition Centre, Spitalfields, London, 2009
- South London Gallery, London, 2010
- Fashion Galleries, Victoria & Albert Museum, London, 2012
- Romney's House, Hampstead, London, 2012
- Tree House, London, London, 2013
- Façade for Paul Smith, Albemarle Street, London, 2013
- Studio for Juergen Teller, London, 2016
- Cowan Court, Churchill College Cambridge, 2015–16
- Black Stone Building, London, 2017
- Coastal House, Devon, 2017
- Blue Mountain School, London, 2018
- MK Gallery, Milton Keynes, 2019
- Housing, Hafen City, Hamburg, 2020
- A2-B2, Design District London, 2021
- Bedford House Community Centre, London 2021

== Bibliography ==
- Never Modern by 6a architects and Irénée Scalbert, Park Books, Zurich, 2013, ISBN 978-3-906027-24-1
- 6a architects 2009–17, El Croquis, no. 192, 2017, ISBN 978-84-947754-0-6
- 6a architects 2001–22, A+U, no. 623, 2022, ISBN 978-4900212800

== See also ==
- List of architecture firms
- List of architects
