= Michael Joaquin Grey =

American artist

Michael Joaquin Grey (born 1961 in Los Angeles) is an American artist, inventor, and educator based in New York City.

Grey holds a Bachelor of Arts degree in Art and a BS in Genetics from the University of California, Berkeley, 1984 and a MFA in Sculpture from Yale University, 1990. He is the inventor of ZOOB, an award-winning toy modeling system. His artwork, drawing on his understanding of genetics, language, and the origins of form, is shown internationally.

In June 2009 a solo exhibition of Grey's work went on display at the PS1 Contemporary Art Center of MOMA curated by Director, Klaus Bisenbach, held in conjunction with the 2009 Young Architects Program by MOS.

For the past twenty years, Michael Joaquin Grey has been creating work that extends and plays with the boundaries of art, science and media.

Grey's work has been recognized in publications internationally including Artforum, Flash Art, The New York Times, The New Yorker, Leonardo, Artbyte, ID Magazine, Washington Post, Los Angeles Times, The San Francisco Chronicle, Village Voice, London Telegraph, Wired, Zing Magazine, Art & Auction, and The Wall Street Journal.

In the past Grey has exhibited at bitforms gallery, New York and Seoul; the Museum of Modern Art, New York; Los Angeles Museum of Contemporary Art; Whitney Museum of American Art; The New Museum of Contemporary Art, New York; Museum of Contemporary Art, Miami; Museum of Contemporary Art, Chicago; Museum of Contemporary Art, San Diego; Milwaukee Art Museum; Philbrook Museum of Art, Tulsa; Tel Aviv Museum of Art; Nordic Art Center, Helsinki; Norrtalje Konsthall, Sweden; Kunsthalle Loppem, Belgium; Kunstverein Hannover; Serpentine Gallery, London; Brooke Alexander Gallery Editions, New York; Lisson Gallery, London; Barbara Gladstone Gallery, New York, and Stuart Regen Gallery, Los Angeles.

== Awards ==
- 2009 Premier Selection Award, Loop Festival, Barcelona Spain
- 2003 Adobe Public Art Competition Finalist
- 1999 ID Magazine, ZOOB, Design Distinction
- 1998 The American Toy Institute Award, ZOOB, Early Childhood News, ZOOB, Director's Choice, National Parenting Center, ZOOB, Seal of Approval, Lion & The Lamb Project: ZOOB, Top 10 Recommended Non-Violent Toy
- 1994 Golden Nica Award, Ars Electronica, Austria
- 1990 Yale University: Rebecca Porter Taylor Award
- 1987 Regents Scholar: UC Davis
- 1987 Ford Foundation Fellowship
- 1984 Regents Scholar: UC Berkeley
