= Sadie Coles =

British art dealer

Sadie Coles OBE
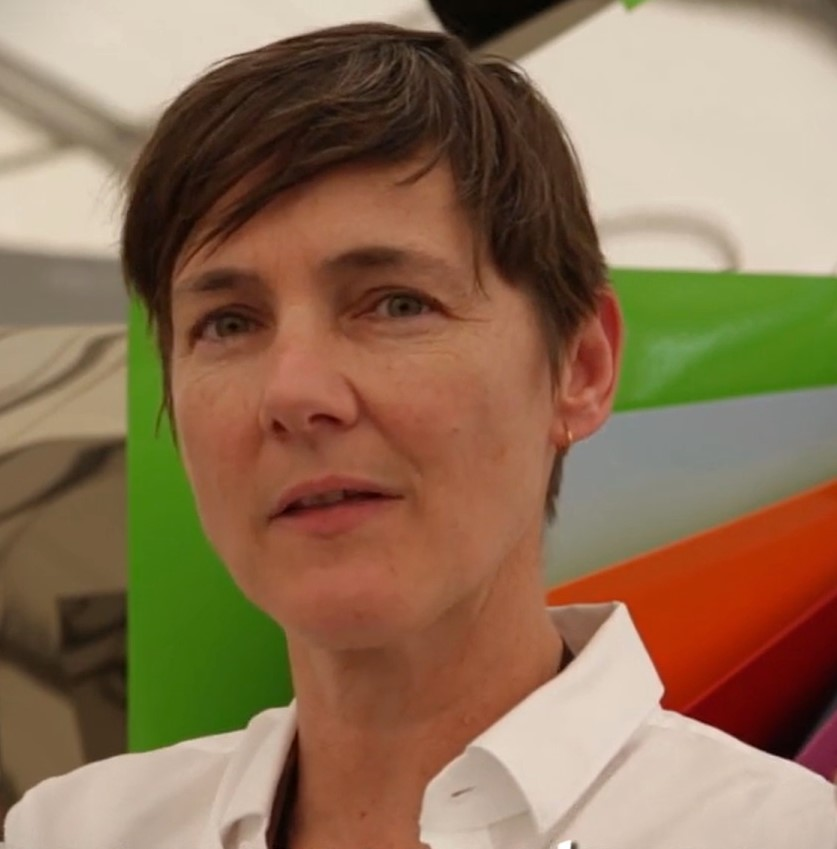
- Coles in 2013
- Born: Sadie Judith Coles; February 1963 (age 63); UK
- Education: Middlesex University
- Occupations: art dealer and the owner of Sadie Coles HQ
- Spouse(s): Juergen Teller (2003–2018, 1 child)
- Children: 1

Sadie Judith Coles OBE (born February 1963) is a British art dealer. She is the owner of Sadie Coles HQ, a contemporary art gallery in London, that has been at the forefront of the Young British Artists movement.

== Early life ==
Coles was born in February 1963. She studied at Middlesex University in the early 1980s and received a degree in art history and film studies.

== Career ==
Coles spent six years working for Anthony d'Offay, before opening her own gallery, Sadie Coles HQ, in 1997.

In 2003, Coles served on the selection committee for the first edition of Frieze Art Fair.

In 2014, The Guardian named her as one of their "Movers and makers: the most powerful people in the art world".

Coles was appointed Officer of the Order of the British Empire (OBE) in the 2021 Birthday Honours for services to art.

== Personal life ==
Coles is divorced from German fashion photographer Juergen Teller, with whom she has one child.
