= Raven Row =

Art exhibition center in Spitalfields, England

Coordinates: 51.5185°N 0.0777°W

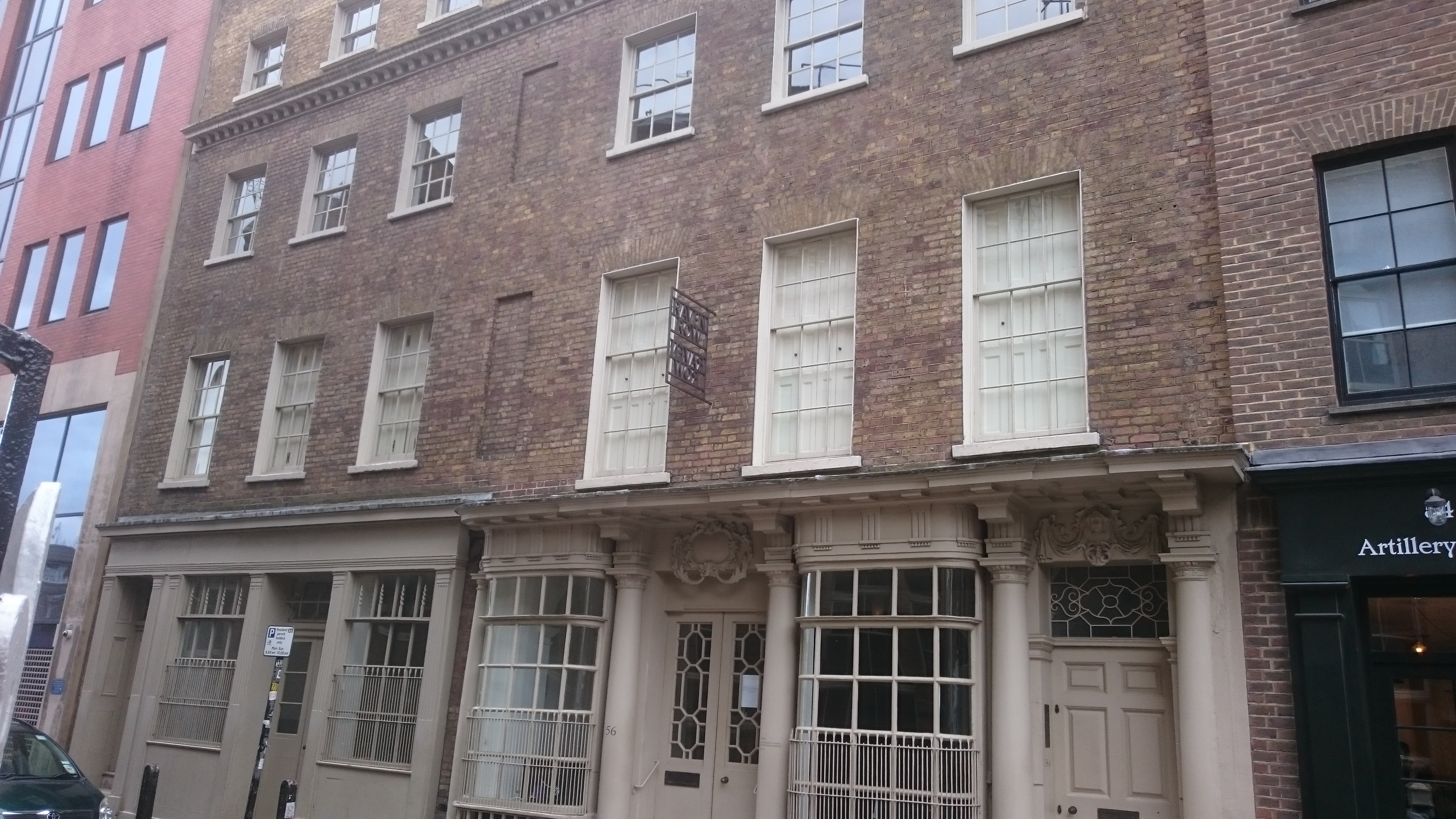
56 and 58 Artillery Lane, now used by Raven Row.

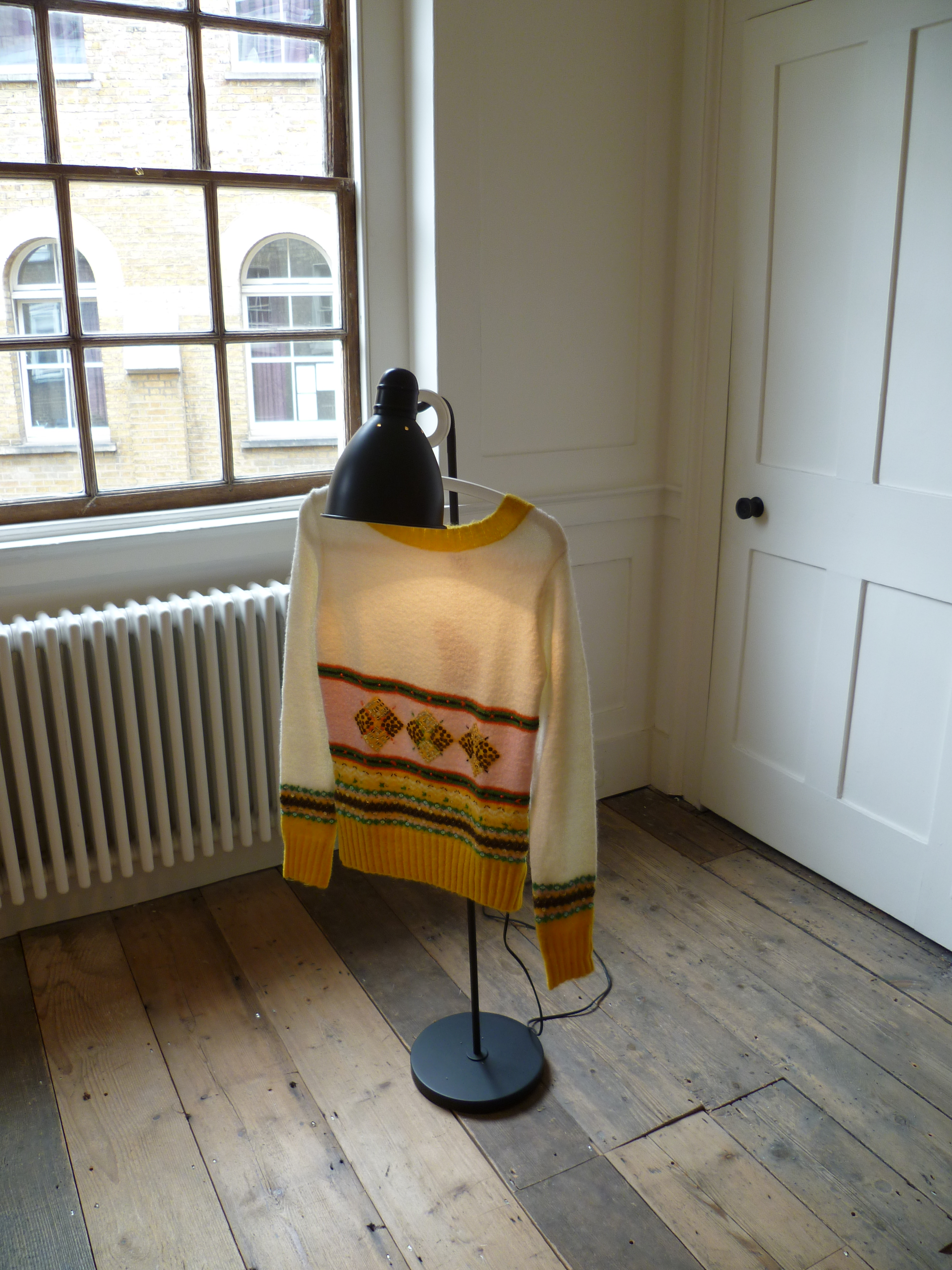
"Consider the Lillies (sic) of the Field" by Padraig Timoney in his Fontwell Helix Feely exhibition of 2013

Raven Row is a free art exhibition centre in Spitalfields. It was constructed from numbers 56 and 58, Artillery Lane. These properties were built about 1690. The area was formerly used for testing artillery and this portion of the lane was known as Raven Row until 1895. No. 56 and 58 had been rebuilt in the 1750s for use by Huguenot silk weavers and traders. The buildings were converted into a gallery in 2009 by 6a architects on behalf of Alex Sainsbury, who established a charity to run it. The inaugural exhibition was of work by New York artist Ray Johnson. Raven Row has held exhibitions by K.P. Brehmer, Iain Baxter, Adam Chodzko, Suzanne Treister, Peter Kennard, Hilary Lloyd, Harun Farocki, Eduardo Paolozzi, Stephen Willats and Yvonne Rainer. Other exhibitions have been curated by Richard Grayson, Lars Bang Larsen and Alice Motard.

Raven Row suspended its exhibition programming in 2017 with the intention to reopen in 2020. In the interim, the Artillery Lane building was used by non-profit groups and organisations including the gallery Piper Keys, Asia-Art-Activism Research Network, London Renters Union, and East London Cable.

After a five-year hiatus, Raven Row reopened in January 2023 with People Make Television, an exhibition featuring archive BBC footage of grassroots programming from the 1970s and 1980s.
