= Ryan Sullivan (artist) =

American artist (born 1983)

- Born: August 16, 1983 (age 42)
- Education: Rhode Island School of Design (2005)
- Occupation: Artist

Ryan Sullivan (born 1983) is a visual artist.

== Biography ==
Ryan Sullivan attended the Rhode Island School of Design (RISD).

His first solo institutional exhibition was in 2015 at the Institute of Contemporary Art, Miami. Ryan Sullivan has exhibited at various museums and galleries worldwide, including Le Consortium, Ueshima Museum, GAMeC Bergamo, The High Line, MoMA PS1; Kunstmuseum Bonn; Hydra Workshop, Flag Art Foundation, New York; Rubell Family Foundation, Miami; White Flag Projects, Saint Louis; and Palazzo delle Esposizioni, Rome.

In 2013, he was artist-in-residence at Chinati Foundation, Marfa, Texas and the Robert Rauschenberg Foundation, Captiva, Florida.

== Collections ==
- Museum of Modern Art, New York City, New York
- Los Angeles County Museum of Art, Los Angeles, California
- Hammer Museum, Los Angeles, California
- San Francisco Museum of Modern Art, San Francisco, California
- Institute of Contemporary Art, Miami, Miami, Florida
- Rhode Island School of Design Museum, Providence, Rhode Island
- Rubell Collection, Miami, Florida
- Art Gallery of Western Australia
