= Museum of Contemporary Art (Basel) =

Coordinates: 47.554573°N 7.601378°E

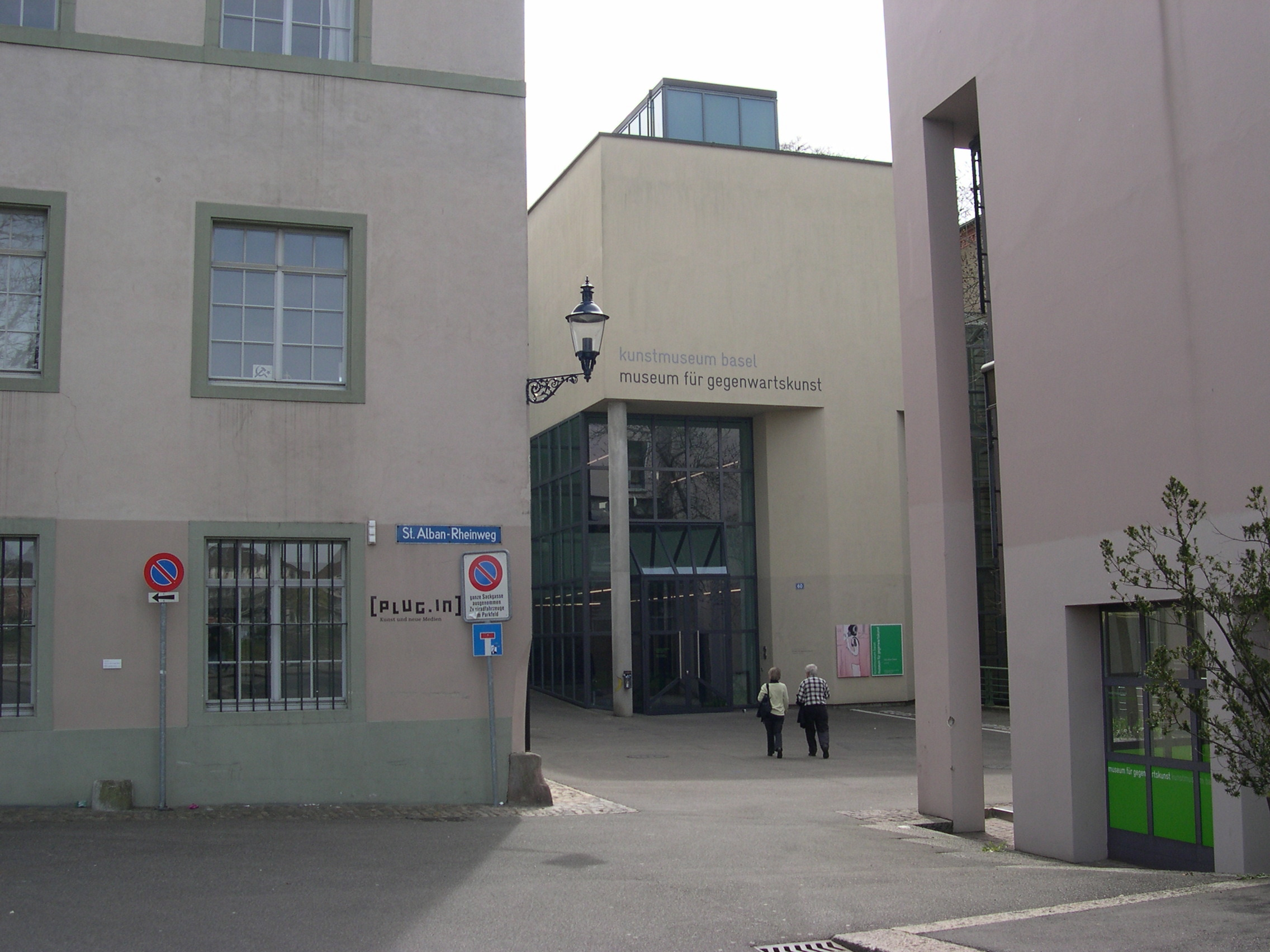
Museum of Contemporary Art in Basel

The Museum of Contemporary Art (German: Museum für Gegenwartskunst) in Basel (Switzerland) opened in 1980 as the first public museum in Europe exclusively dedicated to the production and practice of contemporary art from the 1960s to the present. It is a heritage site of national significance.

In addition to classic media such as painting and sculpture, it also collects video art. Focal points of the collection include the work of Joseph Beuys, Bruce Nauman, Rosemarie Trockel, Jeff Wall and some American art (Robert Gober, Elizabeth Peyton, Matthew Barney). The Museum of Contemporary Art displays works of the Emanuel Hoffmann Foundation and the Kunstmuseum Basel. Since 2003, all holdings of the Emanuel Hoffmann Foundation that are not shown in the museum are housed in the Schaulager in Muttenz.

== See also ==
- List of museums in Switzerland
