= Romney's House =

Grade I listed building in the United Kingdom

Coordinates: 51°33′28.59″N 0°10′46.64″W

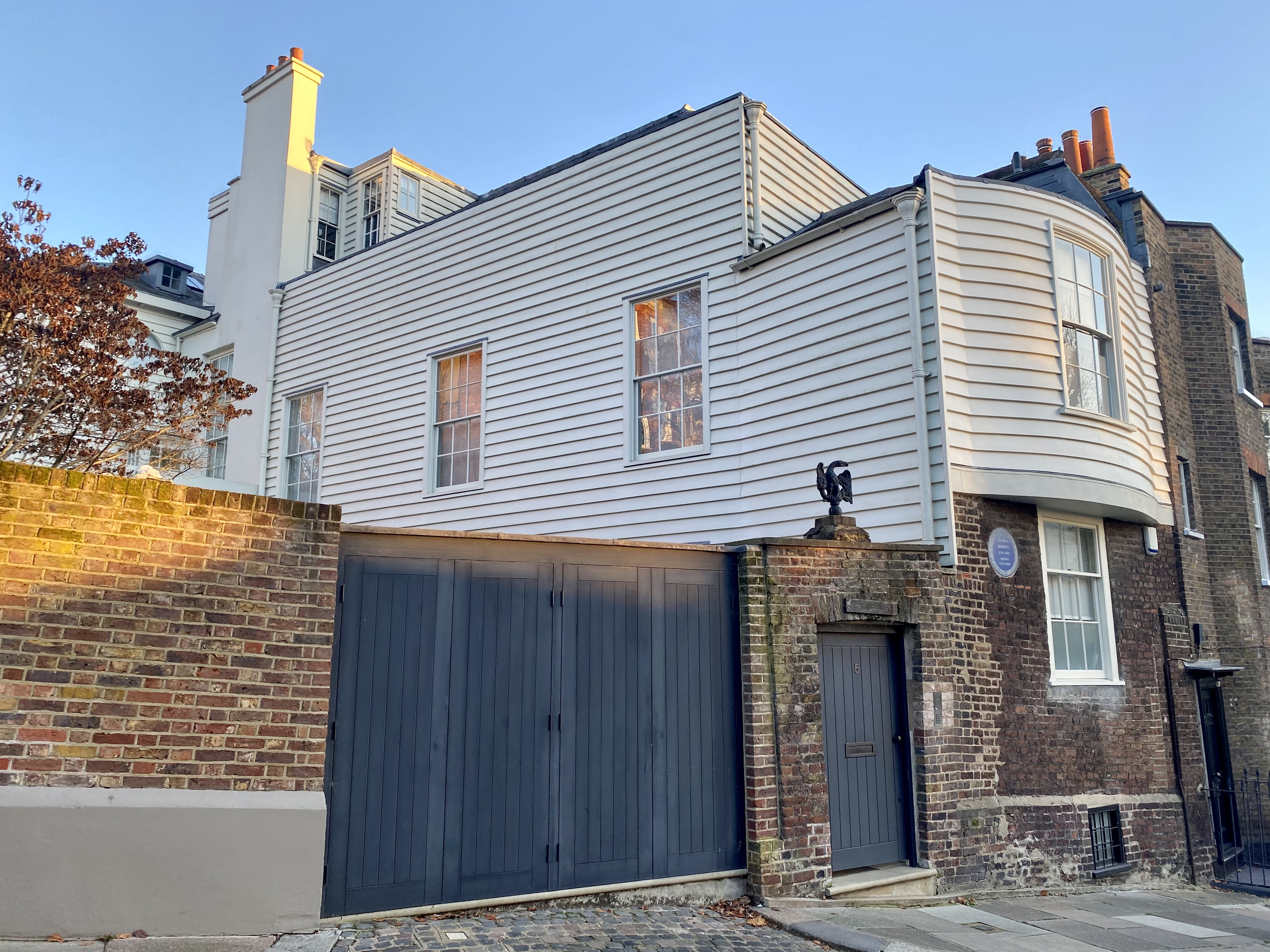
- Interactive map of Romney's House
- Location: Hampstead, London, England

Site notes
- Restored: 2012
- Restored by: 6a Architects
- Website: http://www.romney-society.org.uk/

Listed Building
- Official name: Romney's House
- Type: Grade I
- Designated: 11 August 1950

Romney's House at 5 Holly Bush Hill, Hampstead, Camden, London was the home of the artist George Romney and then of the architect Clough Williams-Ellis. It is a Grade I listed building.

The house was designed for Romney by Samuel Bunce in 1797–8, as a studio and gallery. It was constructed on the site of the stables of an eighteenth century mansion, No.6 The Mount. Sold by Romney some years before his death, it was then used as The Hampstead Assembly Rooms.

In 1929–30, the house was substantially remodelled by Clough Williams-Ellis as his own home and as the office for his practice. The house is now subdivided, part being run as a public house, and part in use as a private residence.

== History ==
=== 18th-19th centuries ===
The portrait painter George Romney bought the original house in 1796, at the age of 61, having previously lived at 32 Cavendish Square in London. A memoir of Romney was written by his son John and published in 1830, in which John describes dissuading George from buying four acres of land on Edgware Road on which to build a house, which John feared would be "attended with more expense than his limited circumstance would allow." Romney was instead persuaded to buy the house on Holly Bush Hill and add a "gallery and painting-room at small expense." The house was bought for some £700 (equivalent to £76,042 in 2025) and his brother remarked that another £500 would have added a gallery to the house which "would have answered all his purposes."

John described Romney as being under the influence of "some worthless people, who profited by his imprudence." The original house had at the time of Romney's purchase "a very large garden pleasantly situated, and an excellent stable, coach house ... situated above the garden on top of the hill." Romney demolished the stable, constructed a new stable on adjoining ground, and built a "whimsical structure, consisting chiefly of a picture and statue gallery" and a "wooden arcade for a riding house" and on the site of the old stable. In the course of the building works Romney removed some paintings and put them outside, where some were damaged by frost, and others were stolen. One of the pictures damaged was Nature Unveiling Herself to Shakespeare, which had been mentioned in poetry by Helen Maria Williams. The building works cost Romney £2733 (equivalent to £296,890 in 2025). The arcade extension later sold for £357 (equivalent to £38,781 in 2025) and the original house for close to the £700 purchase price.

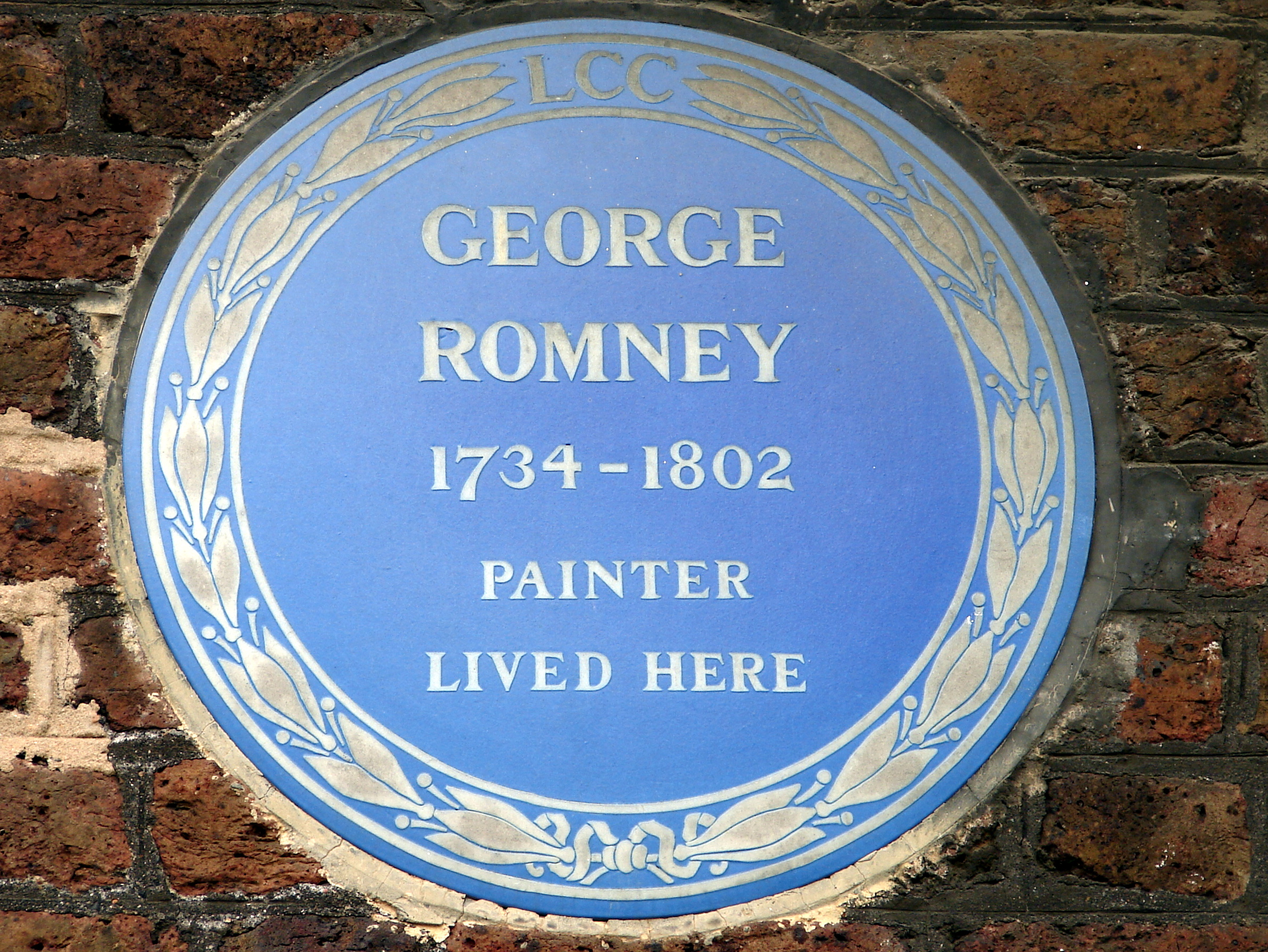
Romney's London County Council blue plaque

Romney sold the house in 1799, three years before his death. In 1807 the house was further enlarged to form the Hampstead Assembly Rooms with a tea room, ballroom and card room. A London County Council blue plaque, placed in 1908, commemorates Romney's residence.

=== 20th-21st centuries ===
In 1929 the house was bought by Clough Williams-Ellis for use as his home and as the office for his architectural practice. The English section of an international writers organisation called "For Intellectual Liberty" was hosted by the Williams-Ellises' at the house and Williams-Ellis entertained a number of prominent writers there including Cecil Day-Lewis, Goronwy Rees and Rose Macaulay. The artist Ethelbert White painted a portrait of Romney's House in 1940.

The interior of Romney's House was redesigned by 6a architects in 2012. The Assembly Room was divided into two bedrooms, divided by a curving full height partition, and a staircase tower was added to unite the different levels of the house.

In July 2012 the house was stormed by armed police after reports that guns had been fired in the area.

== Description ==
The site for Romney's house was the stables of Cloth Hill, "a fine mansion of 1694". The house was designed by Samuel Bunce as a two-storeyed terraced house with a timber frame, weatherboarding and a slate roof. The façade is symmetrical, with three windows and a central door, with a hood and fanlight. Romney's stables were extended in the early nineteenth century when the house was converted for use as an assembly rooms. This extension contains a geometrical staircase.

When Clough Williams-Ellis bought the house in the early twentieth century, further substantial alterations were undertaken. It was again remodelled in the early twenty-first century when it was re-converted to a private house, and the stables were redesigned as a public house. Pevsner describes the building as "picturesque and weatherboarded".
